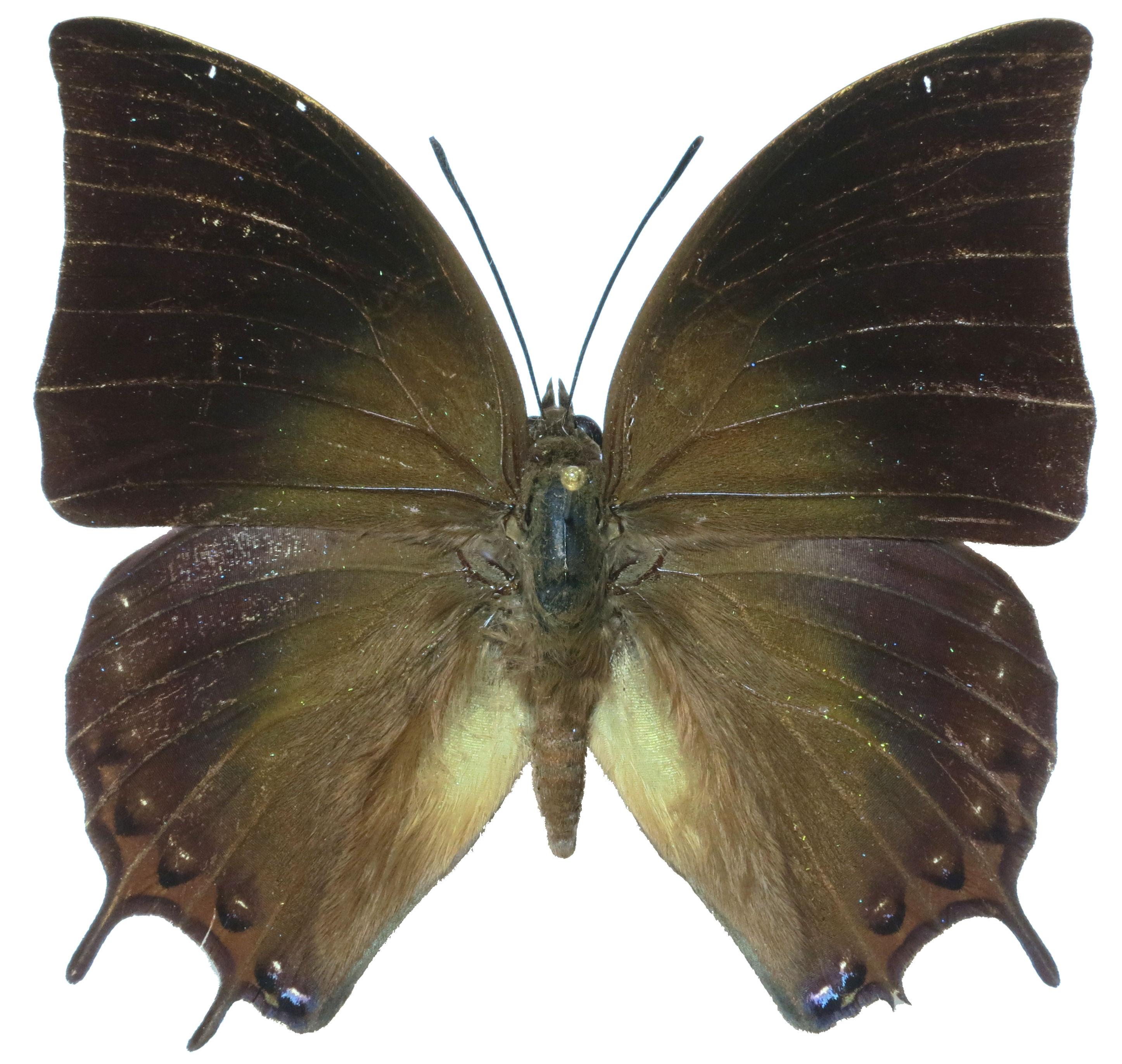
- Charaxes antonius male - Balabac, Palawan, Philippines

Scientific classification
- Kingdom: Animalia
- Phylum: Arthropoda
- Clade: Pancrustacea
- Class: Insecta
- Order: Lepidoptera
- Family: Nymphalidae
- Genus: Charaxes
- Species: C. antonius

Binomial name
- Charaxes antonius Semper, 1878

= Charaxes antonius =

Species of butterfly

Charaxes antonius is a butterfly in the family Nymphalidae. It was described by Georg Semper in 1878. It is endemic to Mindanao (Philippines) in the Indomalayan realm.

It is large (65–85 mm). It is sexually dimorphic. The male has a rufous brown upperside. On the forewings the basal part is more coppery orange and the marginal part is more coppery brown. The hind wings are almost totally coppery orange with a submarginal line of brown dots and two tails each.

== Description ==
C. antonius' Semper, Verh. Ver. Nat. Unterh... Hamhurg III. p. 113 (1878)

The body displays raw umber colour, head and thorax with an olive-green gloss. The underside is brownish sepia colour; the palpi is cream colour, middle of prosternum and the tibiae and tarsi are somewhat darker; while the femora is black with a dense sprinkling of white scales.

The male's wings above are glossy tawny olive, stretching 37–41 mm. The forewing is black. The outer area extends to upper angle of the cell, strongly narrowing behind, about 9 to 10 mm. wide at SM2. Its edge is not sharply defined. The bar D is faint, with no other bars or postdiscal spots. The hindwing shows discal vestigial bars as dark luniform clouds, often faint. The upper two are fused with postdisco-submarginal patches. Of the latter series the upper four are fused together, and generally also with the admarginal line, patches R3-SM2 isolated, their proximal portions are obsolete. The underside is a brown sepia colour, variegated with bistre. The forewing has median bars R2-SM2 continuous, the median interspace M2-SM2 is narrower than interspace M1-M2. The darker median band narrows behind, median bars SC5-R2 somewhat nearer the discal series than the apex of cell. The hindwing has interspace between submedian and median lines of bars from costal margin to M resp. R3 is narrower than in borneensis, with the upper two median bars CM-SC2 nearly continuous. The postdiscal bars are slightly arched, or almost straight, standing in a straight line. The upper tail is somewhat spatulate, about 8 mm. long. The second tail widens towards apex, curving costad, 6 mm. long.

The female's wings above are slightly paler across 50 mm. The forewing has a white band with a faint tawny olive tint. The posteriorly is strongly shaded with tawny olive. It extends from SC4/5 to internal margin. The band is widest in the middle. Anteriorly it reaches the apex of the cell. Its outer edge (taken as a whole) is convex, while its inner edge is ill-defined. The postdiscal spots are R3-SM2 luniform, separated from discal band by black, thin, discal lunules. The postdiscal spots SC5-R2 are about 7 to 8 mm. distant from the band with no median bars. The hindwing median C-SC5 is faint. Its discal bars C-R1 are ill-defined, partially separated from postdisco-submarginal patches by two light patches. The scaling between these discal bars and the vestigial median bars is somewhat greyish, veins SC5 and R1 are especially pale. The postdisco-submarginal has purplish black patches. C-R3 gradually decreases in size and is fused, with the following four separated, and obsolete postdiscal portions. The submarginal portions are deep black. The submarginal white spots are linear, heavy. Admarginal interspaces C-R1 are obsolete. The underside is somewhat paler than in male, with the submedian and discal interspaces partly creamy buff, but not white. The postdiscal and admarginal interspaces of hindwing are greenish bistre; bars nearly as in male. The upper three submedian and median bars of hindwing are continuous. The upper tail is spatulate, 9 mm. long, while the second is almost boot-shaped, curving costad, broadest in middle, about 7 mm long.
