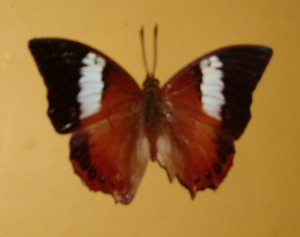

Scientific classification
- Kingdom: Animalia
- Phylum: Arthropoda
- Clade: Pancrustacea
- Class: Insecta
- Order: Lepidoptera
- Family: Nymphalidae
- Genus: Charaxes
- Species: C. bupalus

Binomial name
- Charaxes bupalus Staudinger, 1889

= Charaxes bupalus =

Species of butterfly

Charaxes bupalus is a butterfly in the family Nymphalidae. It was described by Otto Staudinger in 1889. It is endemic to Palawan in the Indomalayan realm.

== Description ==
Charaxes bupalus is a large butterfly with coppery rufous uppersides and a broad brown marginal band on the forewings, lined with a white band and coppery red hindwings with a submarginal line of brown spots and a small tail. It was formerly treated as a subspecies of C. borneensis.

== Technical description ==
Males are similar to C. borneensis males, but the band of the forewing above is white, more regular, and sharply limited by the median bars R2-SM2 which stand in a regular, oblique row. Bar R3-M1 is less distal than in borneensis; no postdiscal spots are marked. The hindwing median bars C-R2 are marked, the following one is vestigial, and a little white scaling at bar C-SC2, Postdisco-submarginal patches R1-M1 are larger than in borneensis. The underside is tawny russet, while the postdiscal interspaces are more tawny. The subbasal and submedian bar are much less edged with white than in borneensis, and lines of bars are much more regular. Its forewing has continuous median bars R2-SM2, with or without yellowish white patches at their outer side. The hindwing has median bars SC2-M2 that are nearly continuous and much closer to discal lunules than to submedian bars. The white submarginal spots are linear and heavy, except the third. The admarginal interspaces are pale tawny; while the admarginal line is tawny. The upper tail is 4.5 mm. long, and the second is a short tooth. The forewing spans 44 mm.

For females. the upper side forewing has a white discal band, broader than in borneensis, especially anteriorly. Its median bars SC2 -R2 are within the band, while the interspace between them and the cell is not filled with black. The median bar R3- M1 is close to the cell apex, with white scaling all round. The postdiscal interspaces R1-SM2 are white, partly tinged with tawny, somewhat longer than in borneensis. Some white scales inhabit the upper angle of cell and at M^ proximally of median bars. The hindwing median bars C- M1 are almost continuous, with a white discal band at the outer sides that is broader than in borneensis, and shades posteriorly into tawny olive. The white scaling anteriorly almost reaches between the veins the black postdisco-submarginal patches and extends distad posteriorly upon the internervular folds. The postdisco-submarginal patches gradually become smaller behind, while the upper two patches are less than twice the size of the following two. Black scaling produced basad appears on veins C-R1. White submarginal spots are linear and heavy. Admarginal interspaces are brighter tawny than in borneensis. Underside, median interspaces are about as dark as in borneensis. The outer half of the wing is more or less yellowish cinnamon. Postdiscal patches of forewing and outer portions of postdiscal interspaces of hindwing are dark tawny olive. Discal interspaces are more white than in borneensis. The white colour is more extended. The forewing median bars R2-M1 are continuous, while bar M1-M2 is a more proximal. The hindwing line of median bars C-M2 is less irregular than in borneensis, with the discal interspaces about half the width of the median ones. Admarginal interspaces are dark straw-yellow. White submarginal spots are linear and heavy, all marked. The admarginal line is conspicuous. The upper tail is not distinctly, spatulate. The second tail is longer than in the allied white-banded Charaxes, mostly curved costad as in antonius. The forewing spans 52 mm.
