= Charaxes (disambiguation) =

Charaxes may refer to:

- Charaxes, a genus of butterfly
- The name taken by the comic book villain Killer Moth after his transformation into a moth-like creature.
