= Charaxes dreuxi =

Scientific classification
- Domain: Eukaryota
- Kingdom: Animalia
- Phylum: Arthropoda
- Class: Insecta
- Order: Lepidoptera
- Family: Nymphalidae
- Genus: Charaxes
- Species: C. dreuxi

Binomial name
- Charaxes dreuxi Bouche & Minig, 1977

Species of butterfly

Charaxes dreuxi, the Dreux's demon charaxes, is a butterfly in the family Nymphalidae. It is found in Guinea and Ivory Coast. The butterfly's habitat is tropical evergreen forests.
