= Charaxes williami =

Scientific classification
- Kingdom: Animalia
- Phylum: Arthropoda
- Class: Insecta
- Order: Lepidoptera
- Family: Nymphalidae
- Genus: Charaxes
- Species: C. williami

Binomial name
- Charaxes williami Henning, 2002

Species of butterfly

Charaxes williami is a butterfly in the family Nymphalidae. It is found in northern Zambia. The habitat consists of evergreen forests.

Both sexes are attracted to fermenting fruit and fermenting sap from injured trees.

The larvae feed on Acacia amythethophylla.
