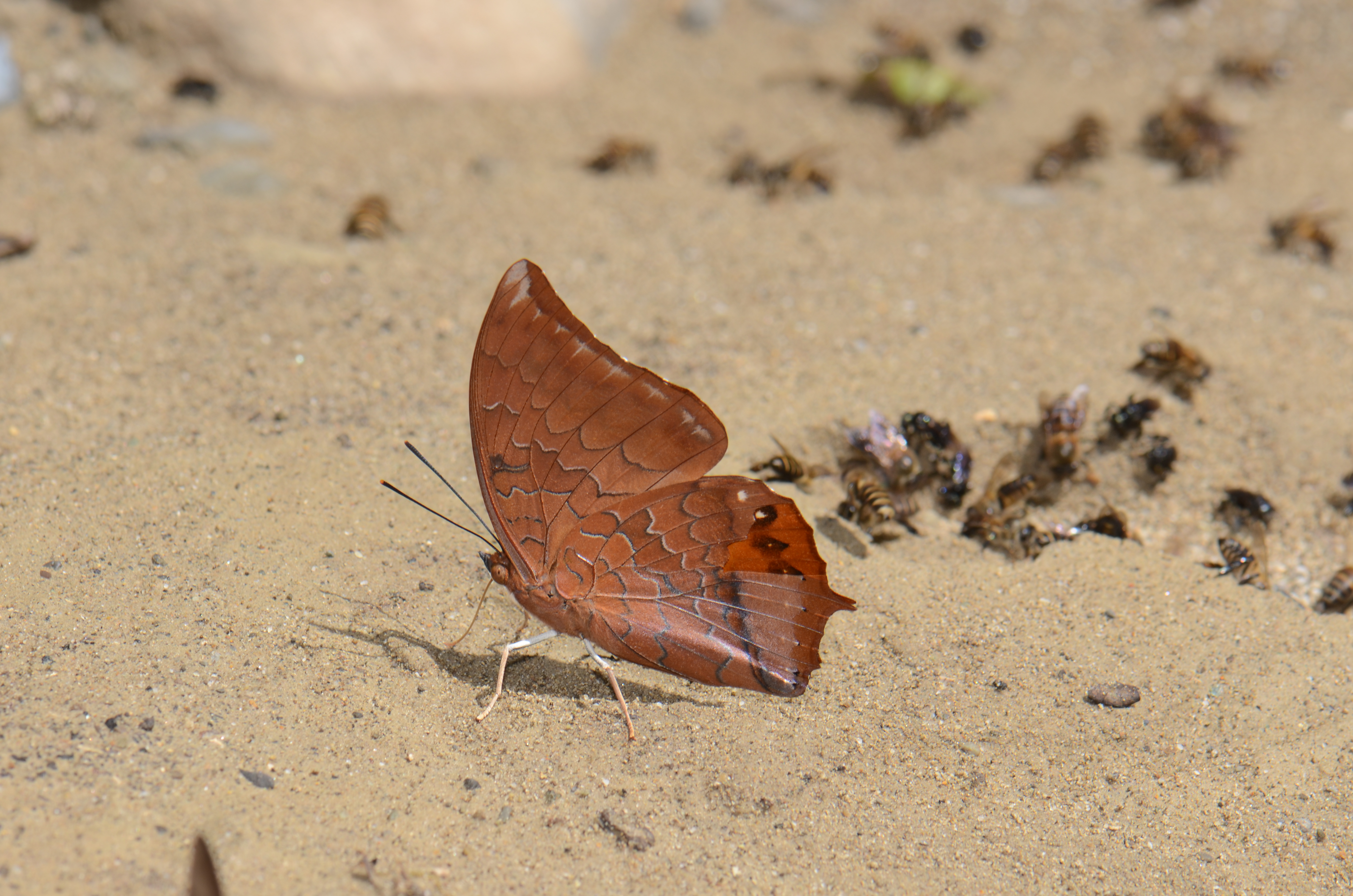

Scientific classification
- Kingdom: Animalia
- Phylum: Arthropoda
- Clade: Pancrustacea
- Class: Insecta
- Order: Lepidoptera
- Family: Nymphalidae
- Genus: Charaxes
- Species: C. harmodius

Binomial name
- Charaxes harmodius Felder & Felder, [1867]

Synonyms
- Charaxes marmax var. harpagon Staudinger, 1889

= Charaxes harmodius =

Species of butterfly

Charaxes harmodius is a butterfly in the family Nymphalidae. It was described by Cajetan Felder and Rudolf Felder in 1867. It is found in the Indomalayan realm.

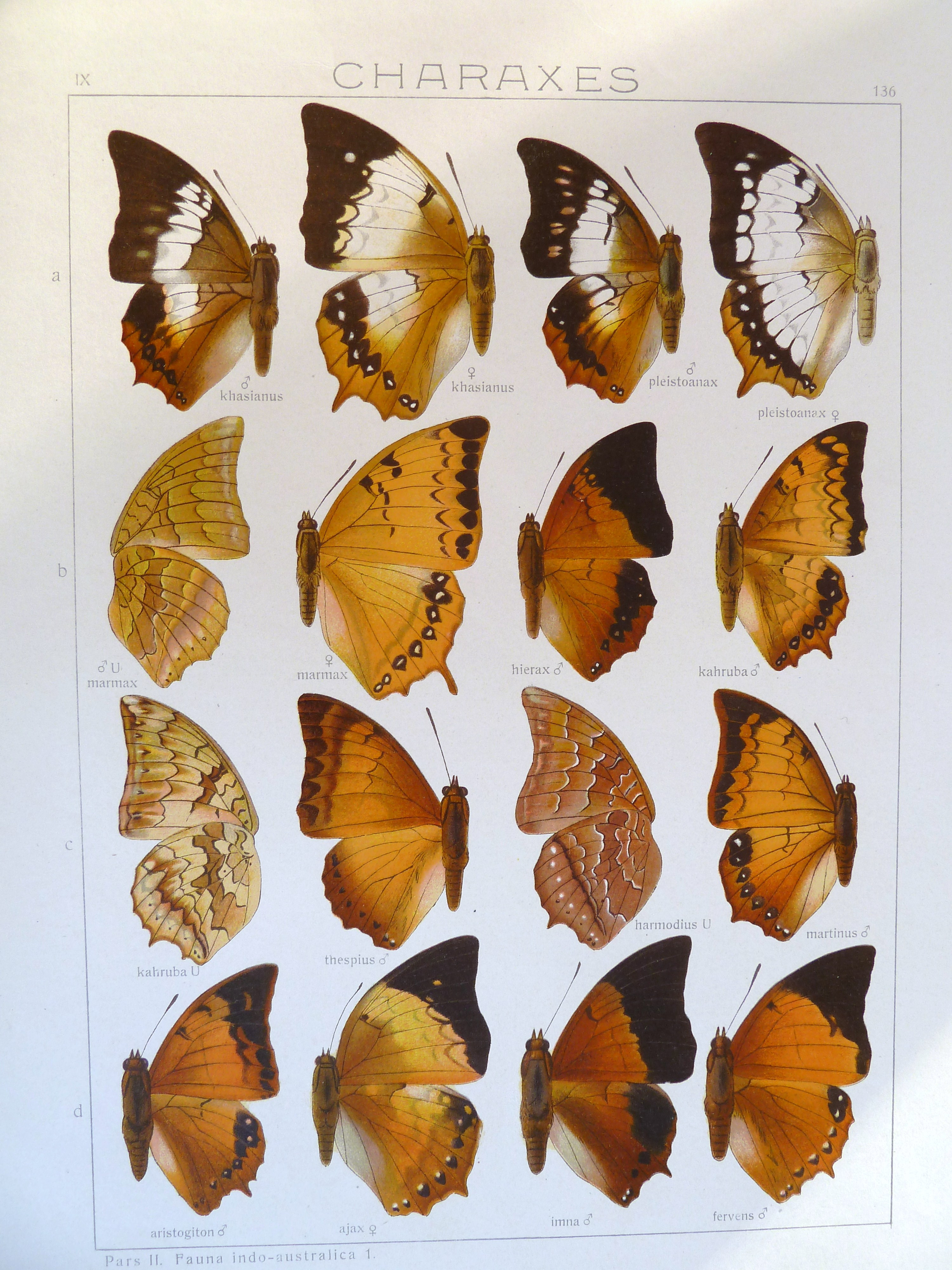
Charaxes harmodius and related species in Seitz

Charaxes harmodius is a large coppery butterfly with concave forewings with a brown apex and border and hindwings with a very small tail decorated with a submarginal line of dark brown dots with white pupils, the first a patch including two pupils of white. The reverse is coppery brown suffused with purple.

== Subspecies ==
- Charaxes harmodius harmodius (Java)
- Charaxes harmodius martinus Rothschild, 1900 (Sumatra, Peninsular Malaysia)
- Charaxes harmodius infernus Rothschild, 1903 (Borneo)
- Charaxes harmodius harpagon Staudinger, 1889 (Palawan)
- Charaxes harmodius maruyamai Hanafusa, 1987 (Peninsular Malaysia)
- Charaxes harmodius shiloi Hanafusa, 1994 (Laos)
