= Charaxes prettejohni =

Scientific classification
- Kingdom: Animalia
- Phylum: Arthropoda
- Class: Insecta
- Order: Lepidoptera
- Family: Nymphalidae
- Subfamily: Charaxinae
- Tribe: Charaxini
- Genus: Charaxes
- Species: C. prettejohni

Binomial name
- Charaxes prettejohni Collins, 1990

Synonyms
- f. fabiae Turlin, 2011

Species of butterfly

Charaxes prettejohni is a butterfly in the family Nymphalidae. It is found in Tanzania, from the north-western part of the country to the Geita District.

== Description ==
See Mark C. Williams 2021 Afrotropical Butterflies Nymphalidae, Charaxinae, Genus Charaxes

== Etymology ==
The species is named for Mike Prettejohn.
