= Charaxes murphyi =

Scientific classification
- Domain: Eukaryota
- Kingdom: Animalia
- Phylum: Arthropoda
- Class: Insecta
- Order: Lepidoptera
- Family: Nymphalidae
- Genus: Charaxes
- Species: C. murphyi

Binomial name
- Charaxes murphyi Collins, 1989

Synonyms
- Charaxes murphyi f. tiridatoides Bouyer, 1990; Charaxes murphyi f. cithaeronoides Bouyer, 1990; Charaxes murphyi f. garnieri Bouyer, 1990; Charaxes murphyi f. pseudocithaeron Turlin, 2007; Charaxes murphyi f. hypocithaeron Turlin, 2007

Species of butterfly

Charaxes murphyi is a butterfly in the family Nymphalidae. It is found in northern Zambia and the south-eastern part of the Democratic Republic of the Congo. The habitat consists of riverine forests.
