= Charaxes viossati =

Scientific classification
- Kingdom: Animalia
- Phylum: Arthropoda
- Class: Insecta
- Order: Lepidoptera
- Family: Nymphalidae
- Genus: Charaxes
- Species: C. viossati

Binomial name
- Charaxes viossati Canu, 1991

Species of butterfly

Charaxes viossati is a butterfly in the family Nymphalidae. It is found on the Comoros, an island off the eastern coast of Africa.
