= Charaxes zambeziensis =

Scientific classification
- Domain: Eukaryota
- Kingdom: Animalia
- Phylum: Arthropoda
- Class: Insecta
- Order: Lepidoptera
- Family: Nymphalidae
- Genus: Charaxes
- Species: C. zambeziensis

Binomial name
- Charaxes zambeziensis Henning & Henning, 1994

Species of butterfly

Charaxes zambeziensis, the Zambezi charaxes, is a butterfly in the family Nymphalidae. It is found in Zimbabwe.

Adults are attracted to fermenting elephant dung. They have been recorded on wing in February and December.
