= Charaxes chunguensis =

Scientific classification
- Kingdom: Animalia
- Phylum: Arthropoda
- Class: Insecta
- Order: Lepidoptera
- Family: Nymphalidae
- Genus: Charaxes
- Species: C. chunguensis

Binomial name
- Charaxes chunguensis White & Grant, 1986

Species of butterfly

Charaxes chunguensis is a butterfly in the family Nymphalidae. It is found in Tanzania. The habitat consists of montane forests at altitudes from 1,700 to 2,200 meters.

The larvae possibly feed on Albizia species.

== Taxonomy ==
It is considered a good species but very close to Charaxes mccleeryi.
