= Charaxes setan =

Scientific classification
- Domain: Eukaryota
- Kingdom: Animalia
- Phylum: Arthropoda
- Class: Insecta
- Order: Lepidoptera
- Family: Nymphalidae
- Genus: Charaxes
- Species: C. setan

Binomial name
- Charaxes setan Detani, 1983

Species of butterfly

Charaxes setan, the black rajah, is a butterfly in the family Nymphalidae. It was described by H. Detani in 1983. It is endemic to Banggai in the Australasian realm.
