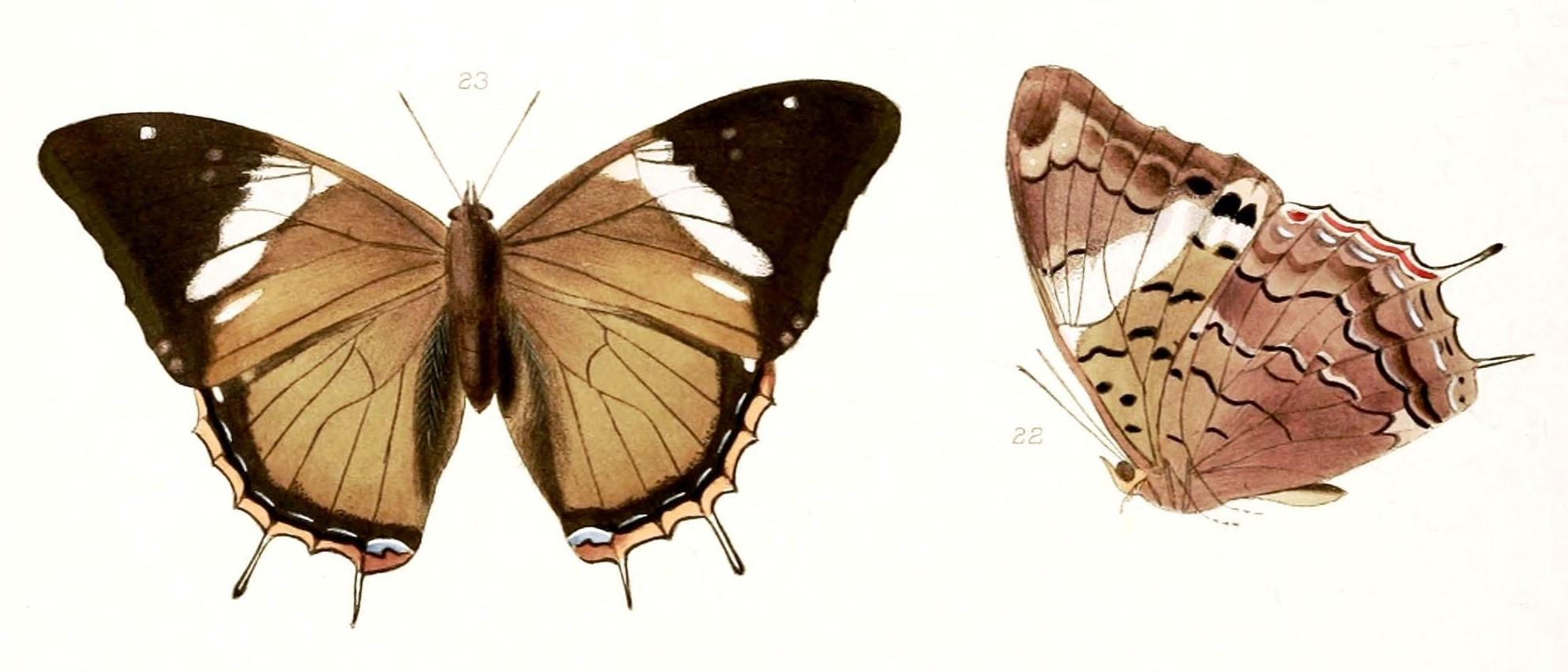
- female upper and underside

Scientific classification
- Kingdom: Animalia
- Phylum: Arthropoda
- Class: Insecta
- Order: Lepidoptera
- Family: Nymphalidae
- Genus: Charaxes
- Species: C. carteri

Binomial name
- Charaxes carteri Butler, 1881

Synonyms
- Charaxes etheocles etheocles f. fulgens Rothschild, 1900

= Charaxes carteri =

Species of butterfly

Charaxes carteri is a butterfly in the family Nymphalidae. It is found in Sierra Leone and Ghana.

== Taxonomic note ==
Synonym for Charaxes etheocles Treated by Henning as a male form of Charaxes etheocles etheocles (Cramer). Both Bernard D’Abrera and Bernard Turlin regard C. carteri Butler, 1881 to be a synonym of Charaxes cedreatis Hewitson, 1874 but neither has validly changed the taxonomic status of carteri.

== Description ==
Original description

Charaxes Carteri, sp. n. Female Charaxes cedreatis, Hewitson, Exot. Butt., 5, p. 40; pi. xx, figs. 22, 23 (1876).

Male Above, velvety-black, the primaries [forewings] with diffused olive-brown border; a small sub-costal steel-blue spot beyond the cell: secondaries [hindwings] with a sub-marginal series of small greenish lunules with white centres; two bright blue sub-anal spots surmounted by white lunules; a sub-marginal lunated greenish line : fringe white tipped; head chocolate-brown with four white dots, collar and tegulae brown; thorax silky-black, abdomen velvet-black : under-surface exactly as in Hewitson's figure of the under-surface of the female, excepting that the oblique white belt (common to many females in this genus) is wanting, and the scarlet sub-marginal lines on the secondaries are less prominent. Expanse of wings, male, 2 in. 11 lin.; female, 3 in. 6 lin. Accra (Carter). Type, B. M.

Hewitson's colouring of the outer border of the secondaries above does not perfectly agree with that of our specimen, being represented as salmon-tinted, whereas ours is greenish-grey, but this discrepancy in coloration occurs in two males of C. Etheocles in the Museum collection. The female C. Carteri is, unfortunately, slightly damaged, but this is explained by Mr. Carter; he says :—" I fear none of them are very perfect; I am obliged to get natives to make captures for me, and my last employee complained that the 'spank of the wings was too brisk,' whatever that might mean, on my complaining that he hardly ever sent me a perfect specimen."

British Museum : September, 1881.

see also as female forma of Charaxes etheocles in Rothschild, W. And Jordan, K., 1900 Novitates Zoologicae Volume 7:287-524. page 485 and as male forma in Victor Gurney Logan Van Someren, 1969 Revisional notes on African Charaxes (Lepidoptera: Nymphalidae). Part V. Bulletin of the British Museum (Natural History) (Entomology)75-166.
