= Charaxes taverniersi =

Scientific classification
- Domain: Eukaryota
- Kingdom: Animalia
- Phylum: Arthropoda
- Class: Insecta
- Order: Lepidoptera
- Family: Nymphalidae
- Genus: Charaxes
- Species: C. taverniersi

Binomial name
- Charaxes taverniersi Berger, 1975

Synonyms
- Charaxes taverniersi evoei Darge, 1977

Species of butterfly

Charaxes taverniersi is a butterfly in the family Nymphalidae. It is found in central Cameroon, Gabon and the Democratic Republic of the Congo. The habitat consists of forests.
