= Charaxes amandae =

Scientific classification
- Domain: Eukaryota
- Kingdom: Animalia
- Phylum: Arthropoda
- Class: Insecta
- Order: Lepidoptera
- Family: Nymphalidae
- Genus: Charaxes
- Species: C. amandae

Binomial name
- Charaxes amandae Rydon, 1989

Species of butterfly

Charaxes amandae is a butterfly in the family Nymphalidae. It is found in Sudan.

== Taxonomy ==
Junior synonym of Charaxes kirki suk
