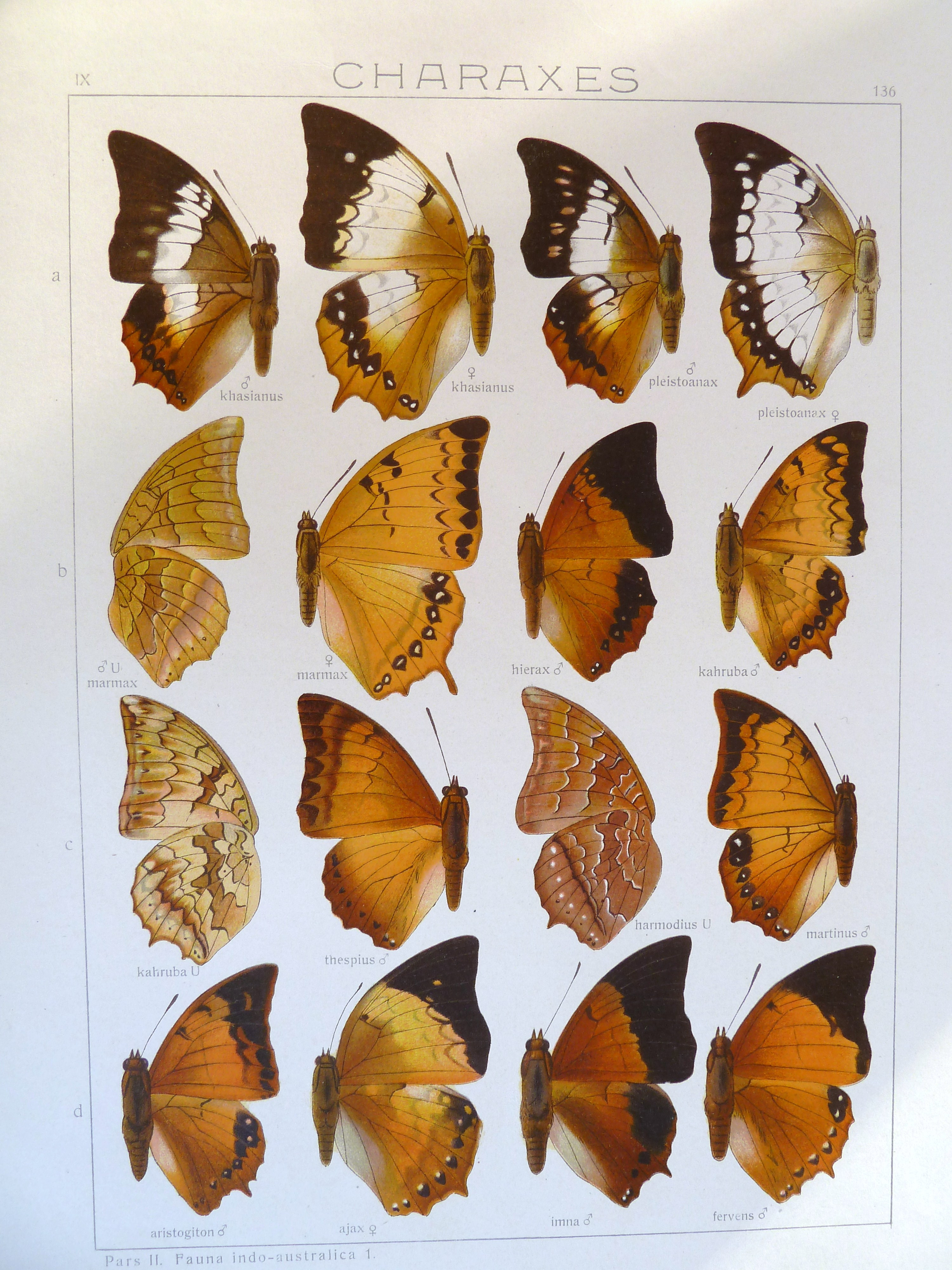
- Charaxes fervens is found bottom right

Scientific classification
- Domain: Eukaryota
- Kingdom: Animalia
- Phylum: Arthropoda
- Class: Insecta
- Order: Lepidoptera
- Family: Nymphalidae
- Genus: Charaxes
- Species: C. fervens

Binomial name
- Charaxes fervens Butler, 1896

= Charaxes fervens =

Species of butterfly

Charaxes fervens is a butterfly in the family Nymphalidae. It was described by Arthur Gardiner Butler in 1896. It is endemic to Nias in the Indomalayan realm (close to the Wallace line).

== Technical description ==
Ch. polyxena [ Charaxes bernardus fervens ].

Male. Wings above as in bright specimens of repetitus [C. b. ajax Fawcett, 1897]. Forewing : median bars not marked; black outer area variable in width in front, always very narrow behind, measuring about 5 mm. behind M2 and 18 to 21 mm. at R1, sometimes interrupted at (SM1), in which case the tawny admarginal patch M-SM^ is connected with the basi-postdiscal area; discal bar M2-SM2 absent, or indicated as a faint tawny lunule, bar M1-M2 black in upper half, bar R3-M1 also black, mostly completely merged together with the black area; tawny postdiscal interstitial spot R1-R2 sometimes present. Hindwing : proximal portions of post-discosubmarginal patches R1- SM2 absent, hence white dots at proximal side of the remaining submarginal portions of the black patches, size of these patches variable, but patch R'-R2 smaller than the following two or three. Underside bright ferruginous tawny, discal interspaces paler proximally, bars very prominent, especially on account of their conspicuous white borders, discal bars regularly arched, on the whole more deeply concave than in the other forms of polyxena. Forewing : position of bars as variable as in repetitus and other subspecies of polyxena, but median bars R2-SM2 rather more often continuous; white submarginal scaling prominent, distally generally limited by black scaling. Hindwing : admarginal interspaces ochraceous, submarginal black, blue, white spots prominent; tail 4–7 mm. long. Female. Resembling certain females of repetitus. Wings above, discal area white, with a yellow tint, more distinctly yellow buff at internal margin of forewing, on hindwing the pale colour gradually merging between R2 and M1 into the tawny colour of the basi-discal area. Forewing : median bars SC4 and 5- M2 marked; discal bars R3-M2 very thin, deeply arched, the postdiscal interspace M1-M2 nearly as broad in middle as the black outer area, discal bar M2-SM2 faintly vestigial, bar R2-R3 rather heavier, the postdiscal spot at its distal side small, two more postdiscal spots in black area between SC5 and R2 Hindwing : postdiscal portions of submarginal patches tawny olive, not black, the patches larger than in repetitus except patches C-R1; white submarginal dots long. Underside, discal, great part of postdiscal, a portion of the submedian interspaces of both wings and the admarginal interspaces of the hindwing more or less maize yellow; discal bars deeply arched; tawny ochraceous marginal band of forewing about 5 mm. broad at R1, here wider than in repetitus; tawny russet postdiscal half-moons of hindwing with few black scales at outer side; tawny admarginal line of hindwing very prominent; tail R3 slightly widened before end, rounded at tip, tail M2 indicated by a sharp tooth. Length of forewing : male, 43–46 mm.female, 57 mm
