= Charaxes turlini =

Scientific classification
- Domain: Eukaryota
- Kingdom: Animalia
- Phylum: Arthropoda
- Class: Insecta
- Order: Lepidoptera
- Family: Nymphalidae
- Genus: Charaxes
- Species: C. turlini

Binomial name
- Charaxes turlini Minig & Plantrou, 1978

Synonyms
- Charaxes turlini f. adelinae Minig and Plantrou, 1978; Charaxes turlini f. isabellae Minig and Plantrou, 1978; Charaxes turlini f. giselae Minig and Plantrou, 1978; Charaxes turlini f. foklinae Minig and Plantrou, 1978

Species of butterfly

Charaxes turlini is a butterfly in the family Nymphalidae. It is found in Rwanda and north-western Tanzania. The habitat consists of open forests.
