= Charaxes galleyanus =

Scientific classification
- Domain: Eukaryota
- Kingdom: Animalia
- Phylum: Arthropoda
- Class: Insecta
- Order: Lepidoptera
- Family: Nymphalidae
- Genus: Charaxes
- Species: C. galleyanus

Binomial name
- Charaxes galleyanus Darge & Minig, 1984

Synonyms
- Charaxes galleyanus f. styx Darge and Minig, 1984

Species of butterfly

Charaxes galleyanus is a butterfly in the family Nymphalidae. It is found in the Republic of the Congo.

According to Vingerhoedt it is a synonym for Charaxes etheocles.
