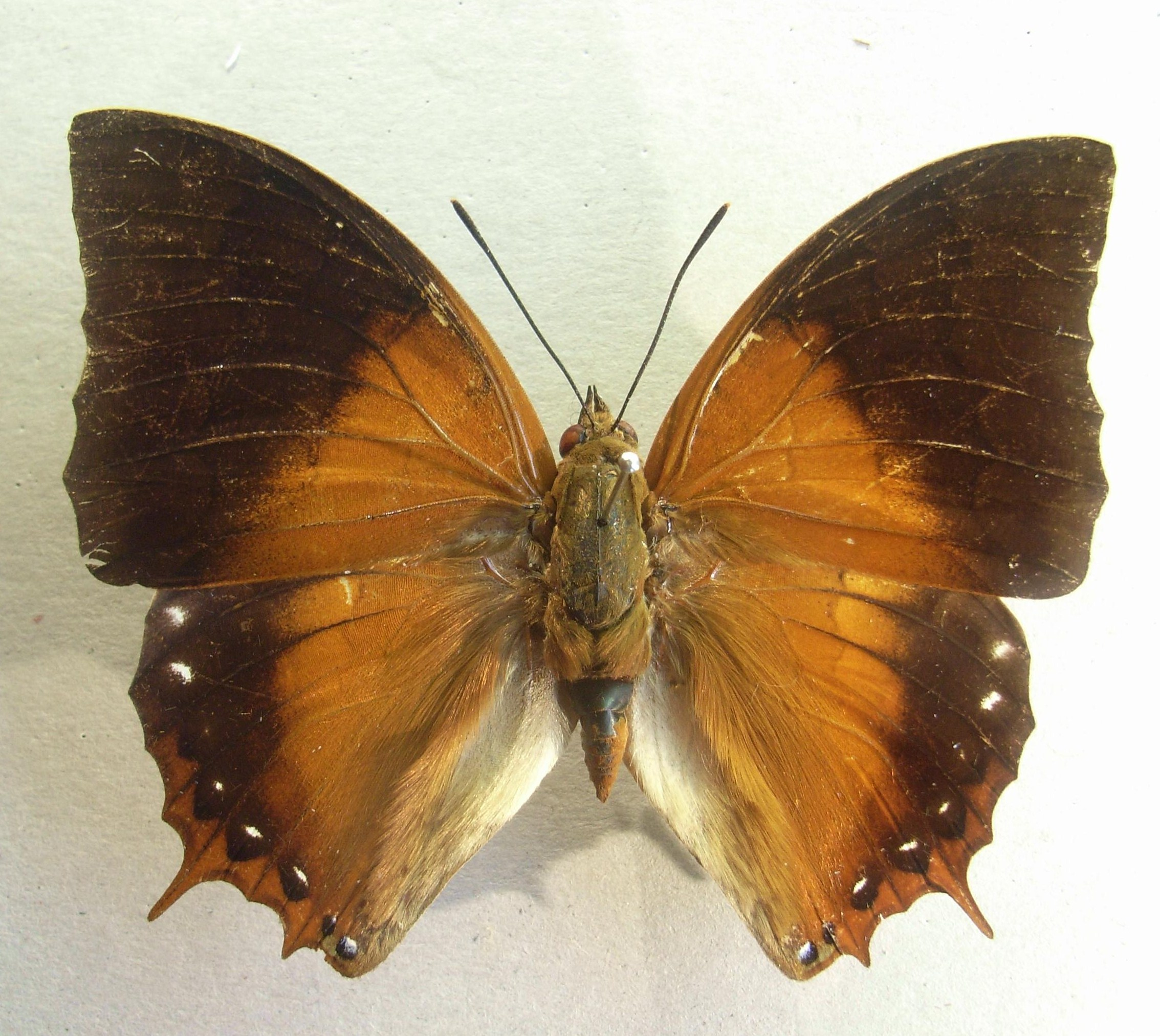

Scientific classification
- Kingdom: Animalia
- Phylum: Arthropoda
- Clade: Pancrustacea
- Class: Insecta
- Order: Lepidoptera
- Family: Nymphalidae
- Genus: Charaxes
- Species: C. plateni

Binomial name
- Charaxes plateni Staudinger, 1889

= Charaxes plateni =

Species of butterfly

Charaxes plateni is a butterfly in the family Nymphalidae. It was described by Otto Staudinger in 1889. It is endemic to Palawan in the Indomalayan realm.

Charaxes plateni is a large butterfly with copper and brown upper sides. The forewings are very concave with a very broad brown marginal band which, at the hind wings, thins and occupies only 2/3 of the wing (it is absent from the basal third). The hindwings are adorned with a submarginal line of brown spots pupillated with white. The underside is beige with clearly visible dark veins.
