= Charaxes dubiosus =

Scientific classification
- Kingdom: Animalia
- Phylum: Arthropoda
- Clade: Pancrustacea
- Class: Insecta
- Order: Lepidoptera
- Family: Nymphalidae
- Genus: Charaxes
- Species: C. dubiosus

Binomial name
- Charaxes dubiosus Röber, 1936

Species of butterfly

Charaxes dubiosus is a butterfly in the family Nymphalidae. It is found in Cameroon. It is a species of doubtful status.
