= Charaxes bernstorffi =

Scientific classification
- Kingdom: Animalia
- Phylum: Arthropoda
- Clade: Pancrustacea
- Class: Insecta
- Order: Lepidoptera
- Family: Nymphalidae
- Genus: Charaxes
- Species: C. bernstorffi

Binomial name
- Charaxes bernstorffi Rydon, 1982

Species of butterfly

Charaxes bernstorffi is a butterfly in the family Nymphalidae. It is found in Yemen. The habitat consists of dry savanna.
