= Charaxes gerdae =

Scientific classification
- Domain: Eukaryota
- Kingdom: Animalia
- Phylum: Arthropoda
- Class: Insecta
- Order: Lepidoptera
- Family: Nymphalidae
- Genus: Charaxes
- Species: C. gerdae

Binomial name
- Charaxes gerdae Rydon, 1989 .

Species of butterfly

Charaxes gerdae is a butterfly in the family Nymphalidae. It is found in western Tanzania and the Democratic Republic of the Congo (Katanga). The habitat consists of Brachystegia woodland (Miombo) at altitudes from 900 to 1,400 meters.
