= Charaxes teissieri =

Scientific classification
- Kingdom: Animalia
- Phylum: Arthropoda
- Class: Insecta
- Order: Lepidoptera
- Family: Nymphalidae
- Genus: Charaxes
- Species: C. teissieri

Binomial name
- Charaxes teissieri Darge & Minig, 1984.

Synonyms
- Charaxes teissieri f. obliteratus Darge and Minig, 1984

Species of butterfly

Charaxes teissieri is a butterfly in the family Nymphalidae. It is found in the Brazzaville region of the Republic of the Congo.
