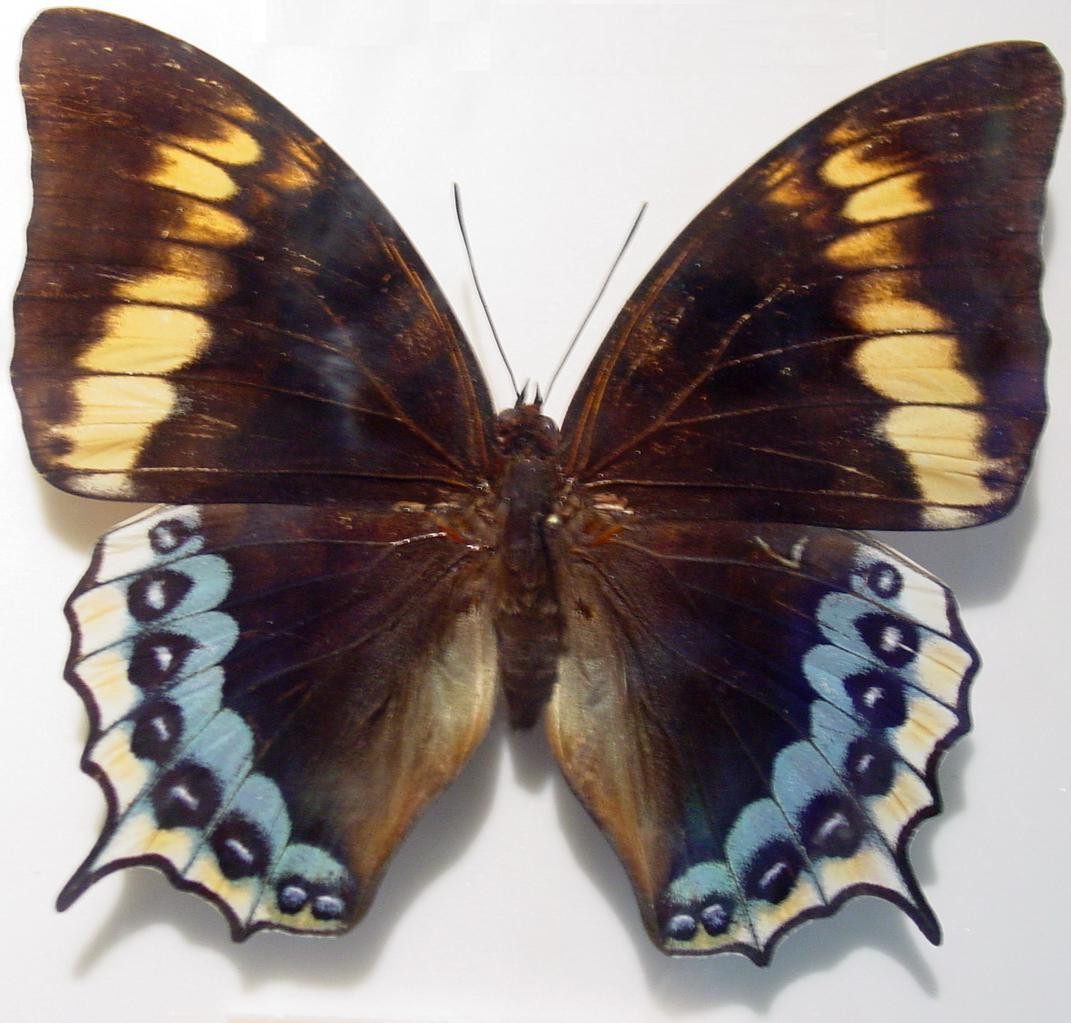

Scientific classification
- Kingdom: Animalia
- Phylum: Arthropoda
- Class: Insecta
- Order: Lepidoptera
- Family: Nymphalidae
- Genus: Charaxes
- Species: C. eurialus

Binomial name
- Charaxes eurialus Cramer, 1779

= Charaxes eurialus =

Species of butterfly

Charaxes eurialus is a butterfly of the family Nymphalidae. It is found on Ambon Island, Seram and Saparua in Indonesia.

The wingspan is about 50 mm. It is a large dark brown, almost black butterfly with concave forewings decorated with a yellow transverse band and hindwings with a tail, a white marginal band, a submarginal line of black spots pupillated with white and then a blue band.
