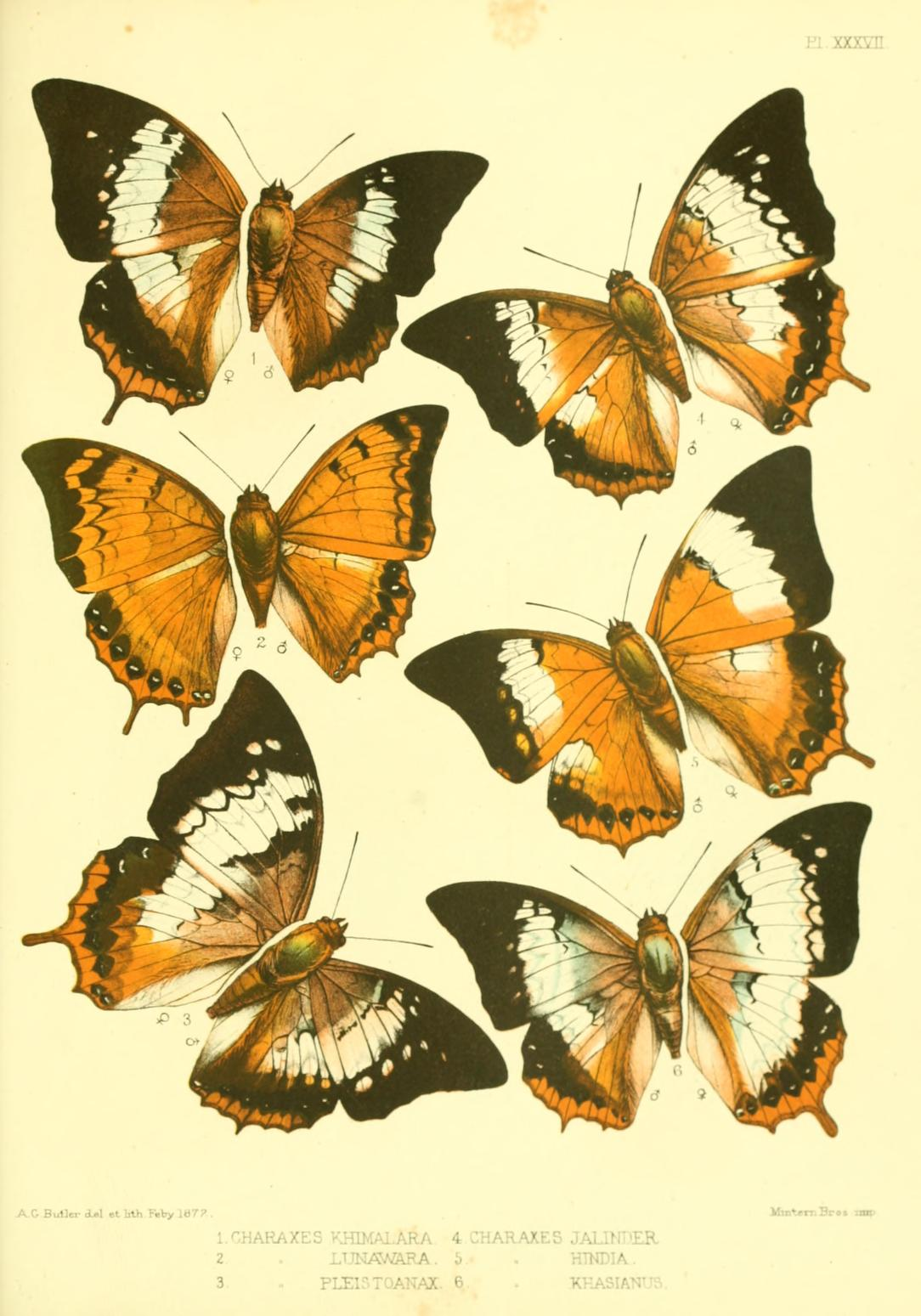
- Figure 2 as Charaxes lunawara
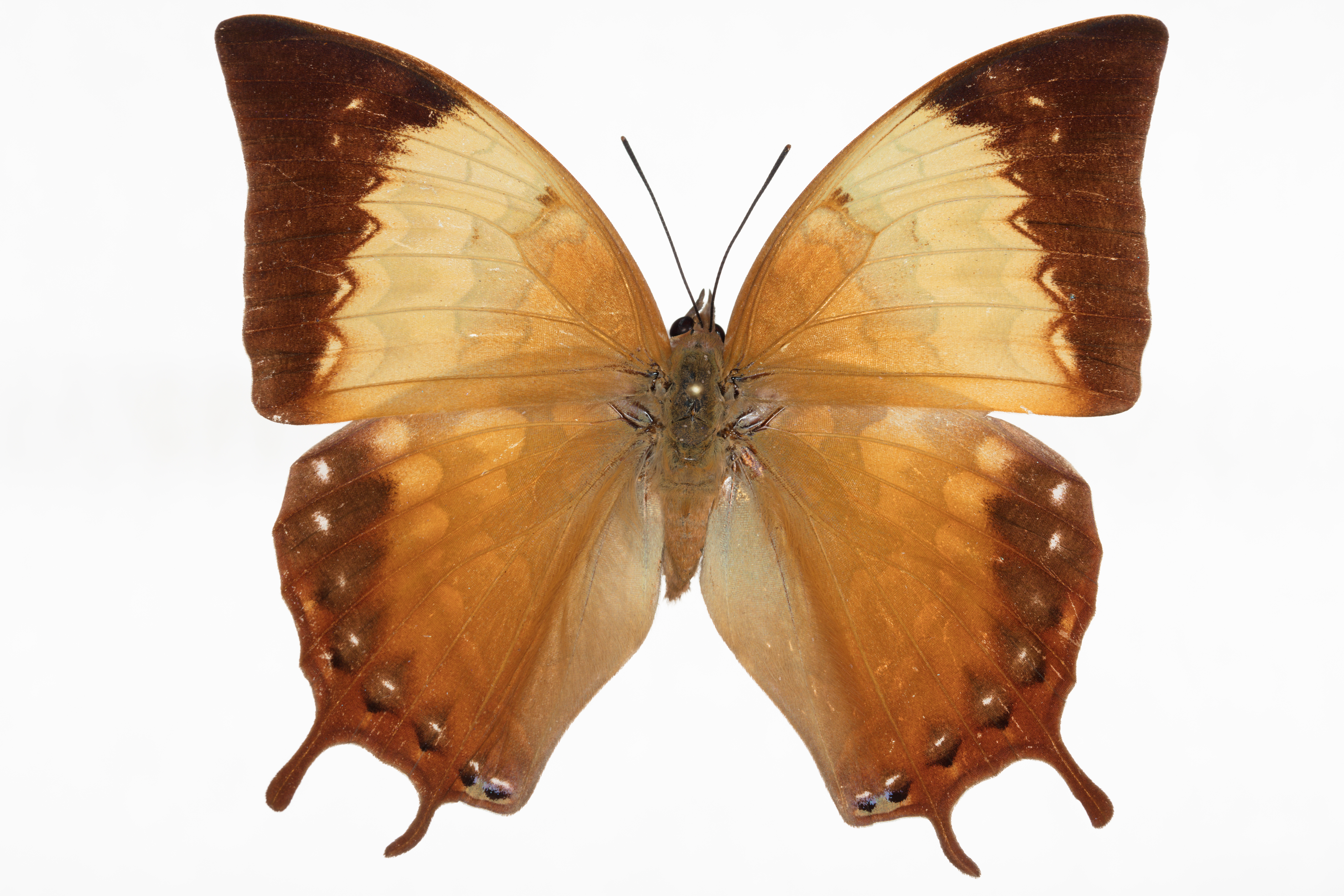
- Charaxes amycus bayani

Scientific classification
- Kingdom: Animalia
- Phylum: Arthropoda
- Class: Insecta
- Order: Lepidoptera
- Family: Nymphalidae
- Genus: Charaxes
- Species: C. amycus

Binomial name
- Charaxes amycus C. & R. Felder, 1861

Synonyms
- Charaxes georgius Staudinger, 1892; Charaxes lunawara Butler, 1872

= Charaxes amycus =

Species of butterfly

Charaxes amycus is a butterfly in the family Nymphalidae. It was described by Cajetan Felder and Rudolf Felder in 1861. It is endemic to the Philippines in the Indomalayan realm.

== Description ==
Charaxes amycus is a large butterfly (wingspan 60– 68 mm.) The upperside ground colour is coppery rufous. There is a broad brown marginal band on the forewings and two tails on each hindwing.

== Technical description ==
Male:Wings above richer tawny than in marmax and aristoqiton, in the forms from Luzon and Mindoro somewhat shaded with olive. Forewing : median bars SC5—R2 mostly joined along veins to black outer area, which extends always to upper end of bar SC5—R1 or farther basad; discal bars R2—SM2 very variable, dark tawny or black, the last one sometimes obsolete, bars SC5—R2 always developed to patches, sometimes tawny brown, not black; postdiscal tawny spots SC5—SM2 always developed, the second and third sometimes very small, spot SC4—SC5 seldom faintly vestigial; postdisco-marginal, purplish black, band extending to internal margin, the last partition often separated by the tawny vein SM2, the other veins show some tawny scaling at ends, but there is never a tawny marginal line, not even at hinder angle. Hindwing : postdisco-submarginal patches C—R1 nearly all fused together to a band, or patches R1—SM2- isolated; white submarginal dot C— SC2 never quite absent, but often obscure, generally smaller than dot SC2—R as in Ch. marmax; admarginal line mostly very prominent, better marked than in marmax and aristogiton at least between veins.Underside different in tint in the three subspecies, resembling on the whole that of aristogiton and harmodius harpagon; discal interspaces of both wings glossy as in aristogiton. Forewing : submedian and median bars R2—SM2 on the whole more oblique than in the allies. Hindwing : discal and postdiscal series of bars atraighter than in marmax, agreeing in this respect with typical aristogiton and harmodius; median and submedian bars M2—SM2- farther apart than in the allies; tails very variable in length, in Mindanao individuals sometimes reduced to short teeth.

Female: Wings, upperside either tawny olive or nearly orange ochraceous. Fore- wing : discal bars R2—SM2- luniform, bar R2—R3 either also luniform or extended basad behind R2, bars SC1—R2 developed to patches, which are black or tawny, and are joined to the black outer area along veins; median bars SC5—R2- (seldom absent) closer to those patches than to apex of cell; postdiscal interspaces orange ochraceous or cream-buff, all developed, but spot SC4—SC5 in the Mindoro form only vestigial; discal interspaces filled up by a creamy buff or orange ochraceous band, which anteriorly extends basad to bar D and median bar R2—R3; veins within black marginal area more or less orange tawny, sometimes with orange tawny scaling between veins, or veins quite black. Hindwing : disc very faintly paler in front than behind, median bars C—R-2 absent (but showing through from below), or the upper one vestigial; white submarginal dots all present; postdisco-sub marginal patches R1—SM2 becoming gradually smaller, patch SC2—R1 much larger, fused with patch C—SC2. Underside : creamy buff or buff yellow, median as well as outer portions of discal interspaces more or less brown, bnt interspace between median bars SC5—R2 of forewing and cell of the same light colour as the discal interspaces. Forewing: median bar R3—M1 midway between most proximal point of discal bar R3—M1 and base of M1 or closer to the latter. Hindwing : discal Iuniform bars C—R1 evenly arched, not almost angle-shaped; discal interspaces C—R1 twice as wide as the respective median interspaces; two tails, upper one spatulate, 7 to 9 mm. long, second curved costad, 6 to 7 mm. long. Length of forewing : male 34–39 mm. female 42–48 mm.

== Subspecies ==
- C. a. amycus (Philippines: Luzon)
- C. a. georgius Staudinger, 1892 (Philippines: Mindoro)
- C. a. carolus Rothschild, 1900 (Philippines: Mindanao, Camiguin de Mindanao)
- C. a. myron Fruhstorfer, 1914 (Philippines: Polillo, Guimaras)
- C. a. negrosensis Schröder & Treadaway, 1982 (Philippines: Negros)
- C. a. bayani Schröder & Treadaway, 1982 (Marinduque)
- C. a. theobaldo Schröder & Treadaway, 1982 (Philippines: Panay)
- C. a. marion Schröder & Treadaway, 1981 (Philippines: Sibuyan, Romblon Group)
