= Charaxes bernardii =

Scientific classification
- Kingdom: Animalia
- Phylum: Arthropoda
- Clade: Pancrustacea
- Class: Insecta
- Order: Lepidoptera
- Family: Nymphalidae
- Genus: Charaxes
- Species: C. bernardii

Binomial name
- Charaxes bernardii Minig, 1978

Species of butterfly

Charaxes bernardii is a butterfly in the family Nymphalidae. It is found in the Central African Republic.

== Taxonomy ==
Treated as a junior Synonym (taxonomy) of Charaxes kheili kheili by Turlin, 2011.
