= Charaxes angelae =

Scientific classification
- Domain: Eukaryota
- Kingdom: Animalia
- Phylum: Arthropoda
- Class: Insecta
- Order: Lepidoptera
- Family: Nymphalidae
- Genus: Charaxes
- Species: C. angelae

Binomial name
- Charaxes angelae Minig, 1975

Synonyms
- Charaxes (Eriboea) angelae Minig, 1975

Species of butterfly

Charaxes angelae, the Angela's demon charaxes, is a butterfly in the family Nymphalidae. It is found in Ivory Coast, Ghana and possibly Sierra Leone. The habitat consists of tropical evergreen forests.

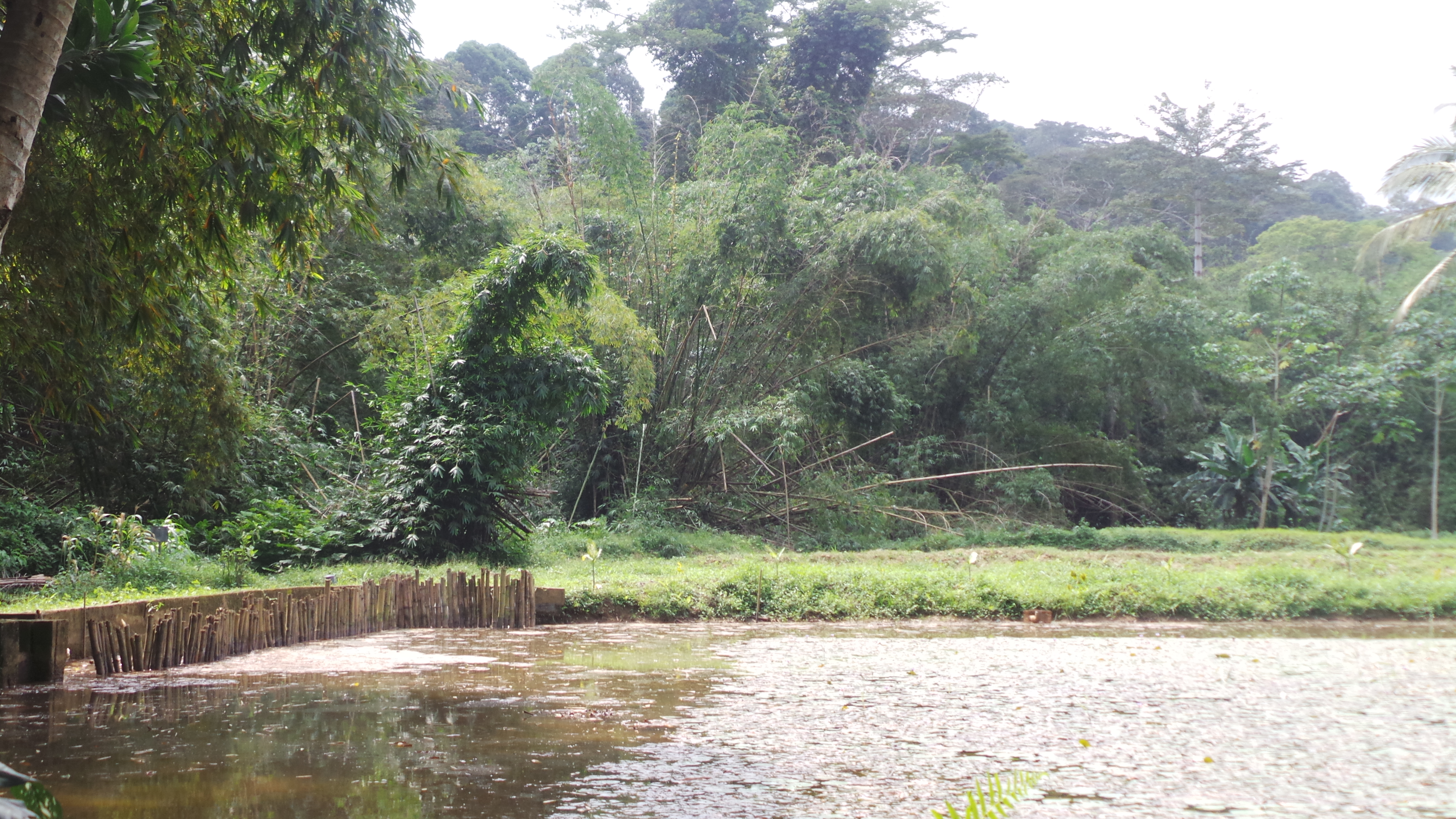
Forest habitat Côte d'Ivoire
