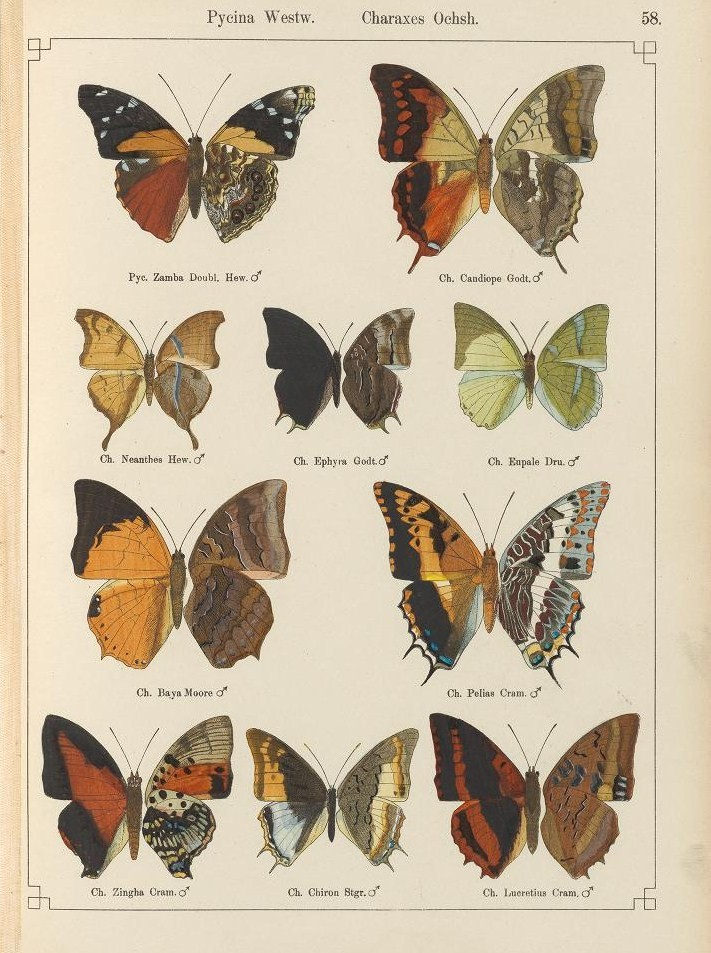

Scientific classification
- Kingdom: Animalia
- Phylum: Arthropoda
- Class: Insecta
- Order: Lepidoptera
- Family: Nymphalidae
- Genus: Charaxes
- Species: C. ephyra

Binomial name
- Charaxes ephyra Godart, 1824

Synonyms
- Charaxes alladinusButler, 1869

= Charaxes ephyra =

Species of butterfly

Charaxes ephyra is a butterfly in the family Nymphalidae. It is found in West Africa. (Angola, Sierra Leone)

== Taxonomy ==
Synonym for Charaxes etheocles.
