= Charaxes larseni =

Scientific classification
- Kingdom: Animalia
- Phylum: Arthropoda
- Class: Insecta
- Order: Lepidoptera
- Family: Nymphalidae
- Genus: Charaxes
- Species: C. larseni

Binomial name
- Charaxes larseni Rydon, 1982

Species of butterfly

Charaxes larseni is a butterfly in the family Nymphalidae. It is found in Ethiopia. The habitat consists of thornveld savanna.
