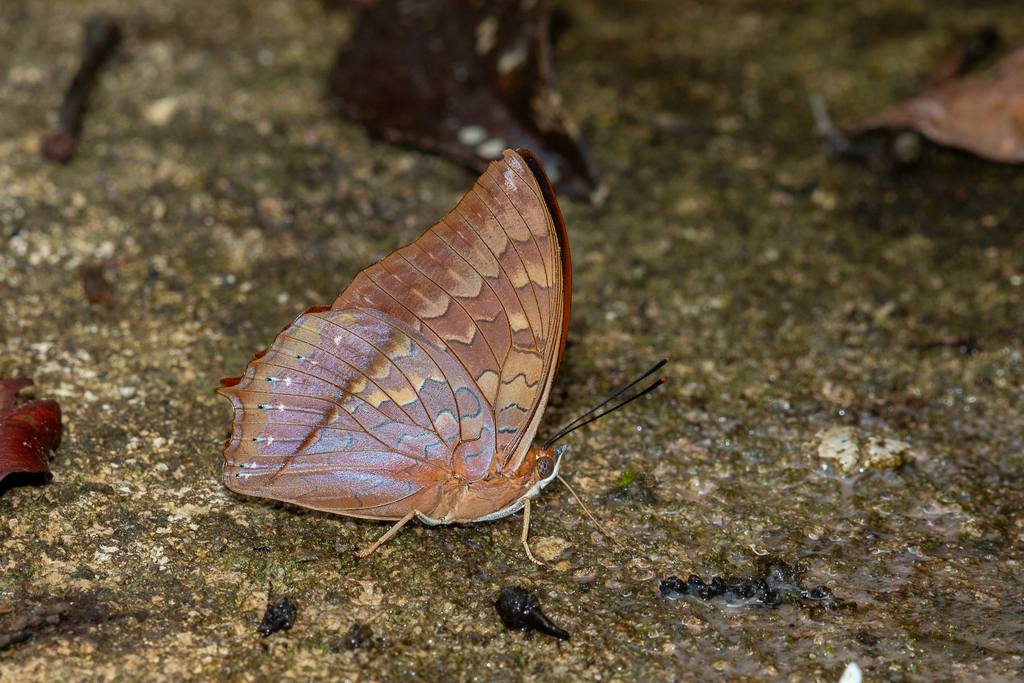

Scientific classification
- Kingdom: Animalia
- Phylum: Arthropoda
- Class: Insecta
- Order: Lepidoptera
- Family: Nymphalidae
- Genus: Charaxes
- Species: C. musashi

Binomial name
- Charaxes musashi Tsukada, 1991

= Charaxes musashi =

Species of butterfly

Charaxes musashi, the Sulawesi tawny rajah, is a butterfly in the family Nymphalidae. It was described by Etsuzo Tsukada in 1991. It is endemic to Sulawesi in the Australasian realm.
