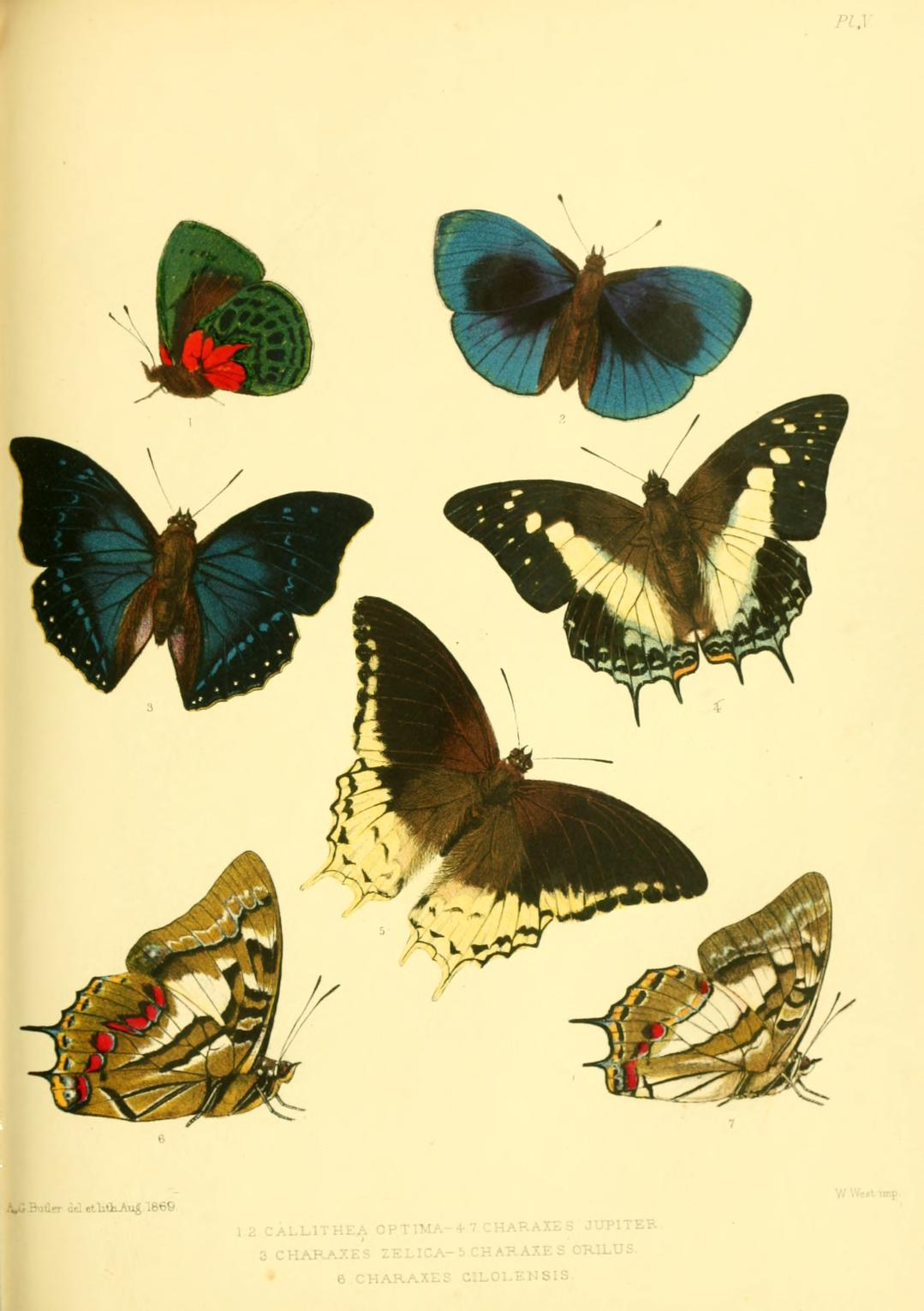
- Charaxes orilus Butler, 1869 figure 5

Scientific classification
- Domain: Eukaryota
- Kingdom: Animalia
- Phylum: Arthropoda
- Class: Insecta
- Order: Lepidoptera
- Family: Nymphalidae
- Genus: Charaxes
- Species: C. orilus

Binomial name
- Charaxes orilus Butler, 1869

Synonyms
- Charaxes orilus wetterensis Rothschild, 1900; Charaxes orilus kissericus Fruhstorfer, 1903

= Charaxes orilus =

Species of butterfly

Charaxes orilus is a butterfly in the family Nymphalidae. It was described by Arthur Gardiner Butler in 1869. It is endemic to Timor in the Australasian realm.
