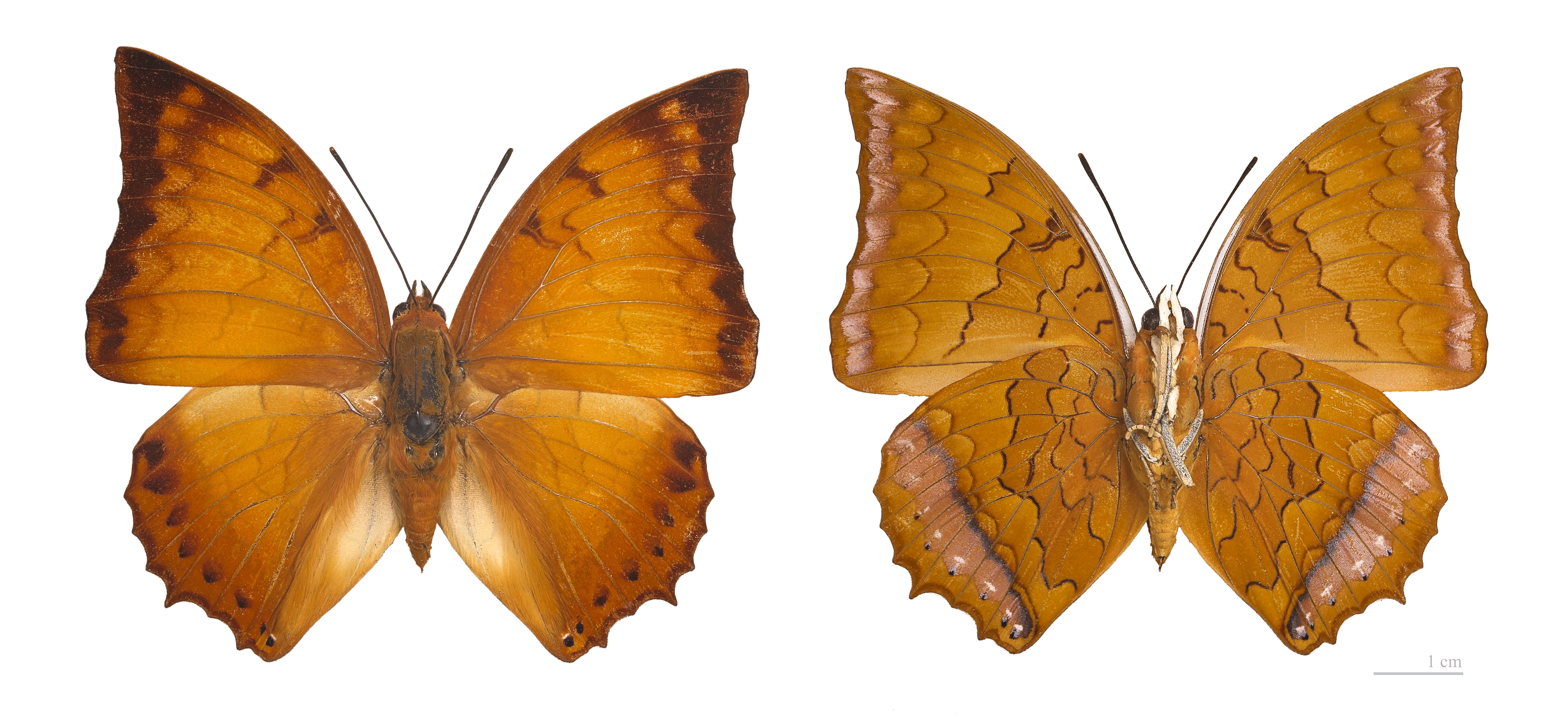

Scientific classification
- Kingdom: Animalia
- Phylum: Arthropoda
- Clade: Pancrustacea
- Class: Insecta
- Order: Lepidoptera
- Family: Nymphalidae
- Genus: Charaxes
- Species: C. distanti

Binomial name
- Charaxes distanti Honrath, [1885]

= Charaxes distanti =

Species of butterfly

Charaxes distanti is a butterfly in the family Nymphalidae. It was described by Eduard Honrath in 1885. It is found in the Indomalayan realm.

C. distanti is a large butterfly with a golden yellow upperside, a brown marginal band on the forewings, and a submarginal line of brown spots on the hindwings. The underside is golden ochre.

== Technical description ==
The underside of palpi and the middle of pro- and anterior portion of mesosternum are almost pure white. The sides of sterna matched the wing colour. The underside of the abdomen is often slightly paler.

Among males, the wings upperside markings are tawny, which gives them a uniform appearance. On the forewing the median bars R^—M' are mostly marked, the bar R2-M1 is mostly angle-shaped, bars SC5-R2 are heavier and darker. The upper of the two are oblique, forming an angle-shaped spot together with the streak-like bar SC4-SC5. The discal bars are luniform. The posterior ones are often ill-defined, washed out. Lunule R3-M1 are7 to 9 mm from the edge of wing (between veins). The upper bars are widened basad and more or less broadly connected along the veins with brown postdisco-submarginal patches. On the latter the middle ones often reach the wing edge. Patches R3-SM2 are as wide as or smaller than the spaces between them and the discal lunules. The hindwing outer area from the wing edge as far as the postdiscal bars, which shine through from below are darker tawny orange than the rest of the wing. The costal margin is somewhat whitish. The median bar C-SC2 is straight, or slightly arched, often faintly marked. The median bar SC2—R1 is mostly absent, sometimes vestigial. The postdisco-submarginal patches are small. The postdiscal portions (proximal of the white dots) are obliterated, except between C and R2 where they are more or less clearly marked. Sometimes nearly all the patches are reduced to spots. The last two dots are more black than the others. The admarginal line is separated into lunules, mostly clearly defined. The tails are reduced to short teeth. The underside varies from orange ochraceous rufous to yellowish ochraceous. The bars are tawny or ochraceous tawny. The postdiscal hindwing series are mostly slaty black. The forewing costal margin to a little beyond apex of cell is white. The basal dot of cell is absent. Cell-bar 3 is broken into dots that may fuse together. Sometimes the posterior dots are obliterated. The bar, if nearly entire, is heavier than the other cell-bars. Cell-bar 4 is often straight, reaching M at or before, but never distally of, the point of origin of M1. The median bars R2-SM2 stand in an oblique, almost continuous, series. Bar R2-R1 is almost exactly in front of bar R3-M1. The discal interspaces narrow behind. The white submarginal scaling is band-like. The apical patches are often much smaller than those towards the internal angle. The hindwing has two cell-bars converging in front, often fused. The upper postdiscal bars are luniform, more or less fused to a nearly straight band. The white submarginal dots are prominent. The forewing is

In females, the wing disc is slightly paler. The postdisco submarginal spots and the white submarginal dots of the hindwings are larger. The hindmarginal interspaces of the hindwing below are more wax-yellow. forewing. The forewing is 52mm.

== Subspecies ==
- C. h. harmodius (Java, Sumatra)
- C. h. martinus Rothschild, 1900 (Sumatra, Peninsular Malaya)
- C. h. infernus Rothschild, 1903 (Borneo)
- C. h. harpagon Staudinger, 1889 (Palawan)
- C. h. maruyamai Hanafusa, 1987
- C. h. shiloi Hanafusa, 1994
