= Charaxes galawadiwosi =

Scientific classification
- Kingdom: Animalia
- Phylum: Arthropoda
- Class: Insecta
- Order: Lepidoptera
- Family: Nymphalidae
- Genus: Charaxes
- Species: C. galawadiwosi

Binomial name
- Charaxes galawadiwosi Plantrou & Rougeot, 1979

Synonyms
- Charaxes galawadiwosi f. genovefae Plantrou and Rougeot, 1979; Charaxes galawadiwosi f. alenae Plantrou and Rougeot, 1984; Charaxes galawadiwosi f. nathaliannae Plantrou and Rougeot, 1984; Charaxes galawadiwosi f. carolinae Plantrou and Rougeot, 1984; Charaxes galawadiwosi f. florae Plantrou and Rougeot, 1984; Charaxes galawadiwosi f. genettae Plantrou and Rougeot, 1984; Charaxes galawadiwosi f. shoayeae Plantrou and Rougeot, 1984; Charaxes galawadiwosi f. stephaniae Plantrou and Rougeot, 1984; Charaxes galawadiwosi f. jackieae Plantrou and Rougeot, 1984; Charaxes galawadiwosi f. katema Vingerhoedt, 2003; Charaxes galawadiwosi f. leonardi Vingerhoedt, 2003; Charaxes galawadiwosi f. likissa Vingerhoedt, 2003

Species of butterfly

Charaxes galawadiwosi is a butterfly in the family Nymphalidae. It is found in Ethiopia. The habitat consists of thornbush savanna (thornbush = Vachellia).

The larvae feed on Albizia species.
