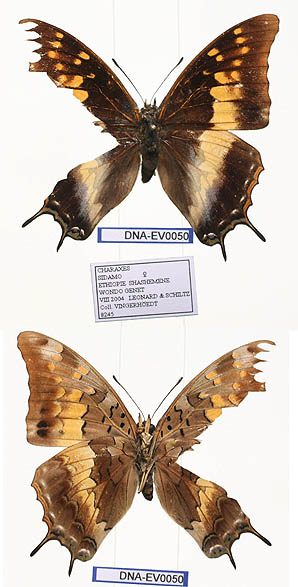

Scientific classification
- Kingdom: Animalia
- Phylum: Arthropoda
- Class: Insecta
- Order: Lepidoptera
- Family: Nymphalidae
- Subfamily: Charaxinae
- Tribe: Charaxini
- Genus: Charaxes
- Species: C. sidamo

Binomial name
- Charaxes sidamo Plantrou & Rougeot, 1979

Synonyms
- Charaxes aubyni sidamo Plantrou & Rougeot, 1979; Charaxes smilesi Rydon, 1982

= Charaxes sidamo =

Species of butterfly

Charaxes sidamo is a butterfly in the family Nymphalidae. It is found in southern and north-eastern Ethiopia. The habitat consists of thornbush savanna (thornbush = Vachellia). The holotype (male) is in the Muséum national d’Histoire naturelle.
