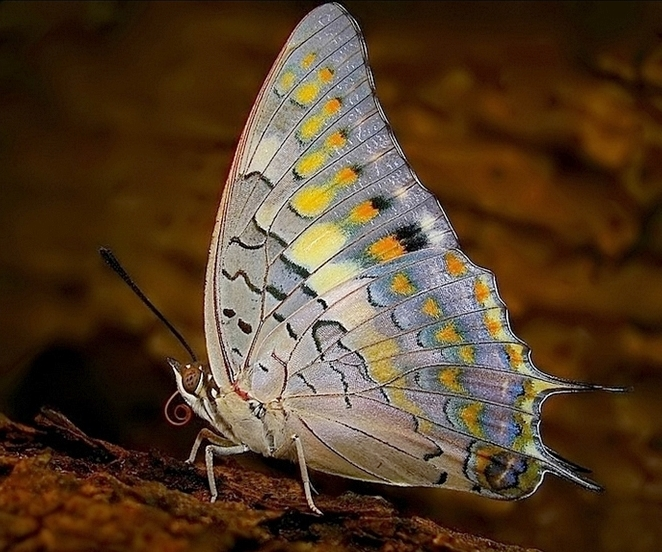
- C. solon at Mahim Nature Park, Mumbai

Scientific classification
- Kingdom: Animalia
- Phylum: Arthropoda
- Clade: Pancrustacea
- Class: Insecta
- Order: Lepidoptera
- Family: Nymphalidae
- Subfamily: Charaxinae
- Tribe: Charaxini
- Genus: Charaxes; Ochsenheimer, 1816

Species
- Many, see text

Synonyms
- Paphia Fabricius, 1807; Eriboea Hübner, [1819]; Jasia Swainson, 1832; Monura Mabille, 1877; Haridra Moore, [1880]; Zingha Hemming, 1939; Hadrodontes Stoneham, 1964; Stonehamia Cowan, 1968

= Charaxes =

Genus of brush-footed butterflies

The rajah and pasha butterflies (genus Charaxes), also known as emperors in Africa and Australia, make up the type genus of the brush-footed butterfly subfamily Charaxinae, or leafwing butterflies. They belong to the tribe Charaxini, which also includes the nawab butterflies (Polyura, a subgenus of Charaxes). Charaxes are tropical Old World butterflies, with by far the highest diversity in sub-Saharan Africa, a smaller number from South Asia to Melanesia and Australia, and a single species (C. jasius) in Europe. They are generally strong flyers and are popular among butterfly collectors.

== Etymology ==
Charaxes means "to sharpen" or "to make pointed", referring to the pointed 'tails' on the hind wing. Charaxes may also be related to charax, meaning 'a sharp stake', or charaxis, a 'notch' or 'incision', which are also features of the hind wing.

== Biology ==
Charaxes frequent sunny forest openings and glades where they rest with open or partly open wings sunning themselves. When alerted, they close the wings exposing the cryptic underside. Certain favoured perches are selected and intruders are chased and driven off, Charaxes feed in part at oozes from tree wounds infested with beetle or other larvae and on rotting fruit (they come to hanging traps baited with fermenting banana). They lay their eggs on small understorey or marginal trees. Tender shoots are usually selected for egg laying but as the larvae grow they move to older leaves. Larvae rest on the upper surface of a leaf on which they have spun a protecting silk pad.

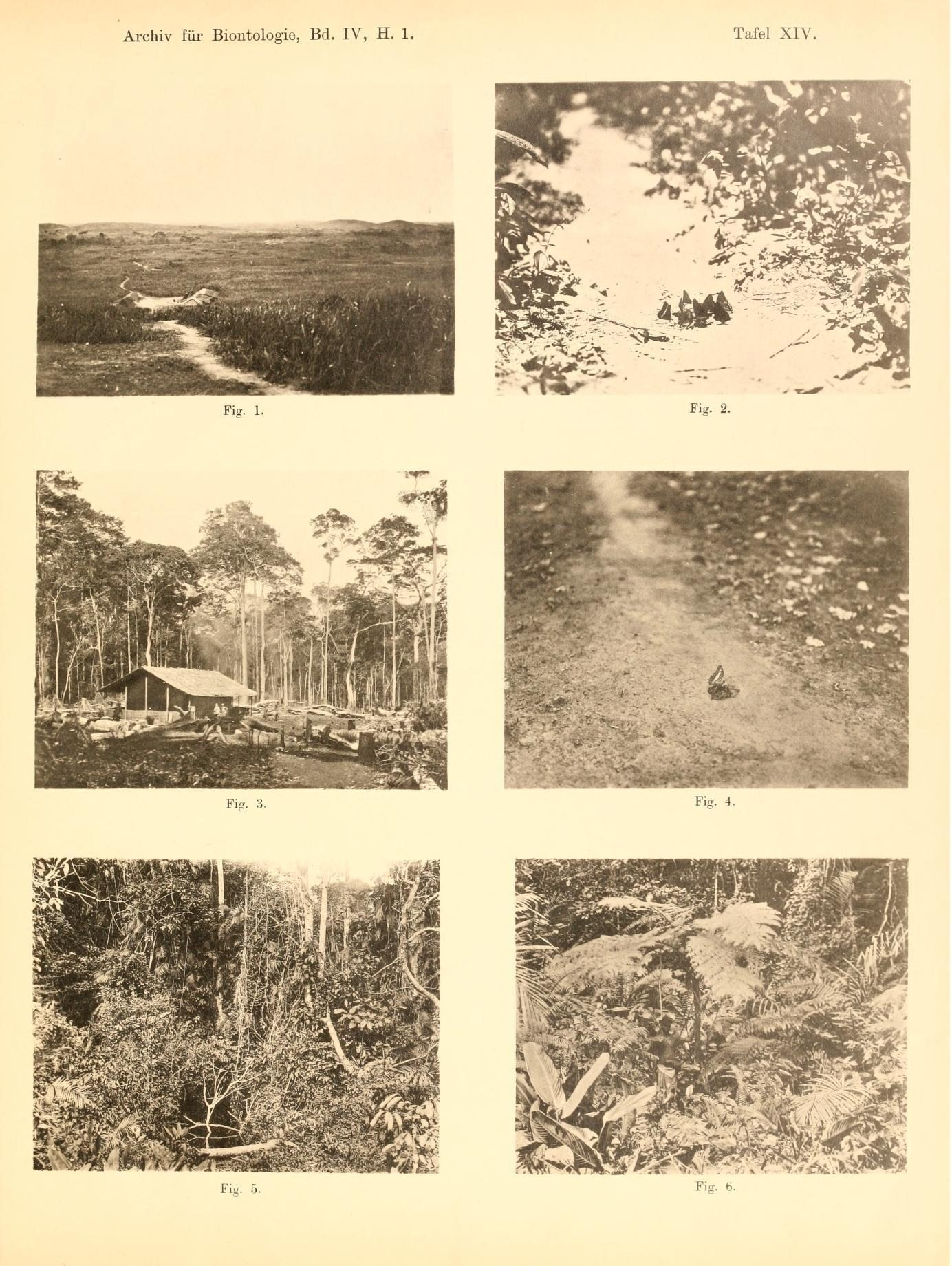
Photograph from Schultze, 1917 Die Charaxiden und Apaturiden der Kolonie Kamerun, illustrating aspects of Charaxes biology

The most striking features in the habits of Charaxes are the powerful rapid flight, the partiality to putrid matter and the constancy with which a specimen returns to the same spot. Few species are found in the open country (C. pelias, C. jasius, and C. fabius), where there are only bushes and rarely trees; most species inhabit the more wooded country and some are found only in and near larger forests. The males come often in some numbers to water pools on roads where they mud puddle; both sexes are fond of the juice of trees, decaying fruits, dung of animals and putrid meat and can successfully be entrapped by the use of such baits; one is known to come to flowers (C. zoolina). Some species locate mates by hill-topping.

The larvae feed variously on Rhamnaceae, Leguminosae, Sapindaceae, Melianthaceae, Euphorbiaceae, Gramineae, Ochnaceae, Lauraceae, Tiliaceae, Meliaceae, etc.

Charaxes acraeoides is part of a mimetic ring with Pseudacraea and Acraea. The closely related Charaxes fournierae mimics species of Euphaedra.

== Life history ==
The caterpillar form of Charaxes is widest in or before the middle, narrowed behind, and has a finely granulated skin. The head is flat, prognathous, and bears four processes which point backwards and are rough with tubercles, as is the hinder edge of the head between the processes; cheeks also tuberculated; the anal segment bears dorsally two more or less prominent processes, which are longer in the young larva than in the full-grown one. The colour of the larvae is generally green, often yellowish, the head bears, on each side, a light line which runs along the outer horn, and there is a spot on one or more abdominal segments, the colour of these latter markings, which are mostly more or less halfmoon-shaped, is as a rule buffish, the spots having often a darker (reddish or bluish) border. The caterpillar is a very slow creature, which does not voluntarily leave the twig on a leaf of which the egg was deposited.

The thick chrysalis is bright green as a rule, very smooth and shining, dorsally very convex; head bluntly bipartite; end of abdomen with two rounded tubercles ventrally."

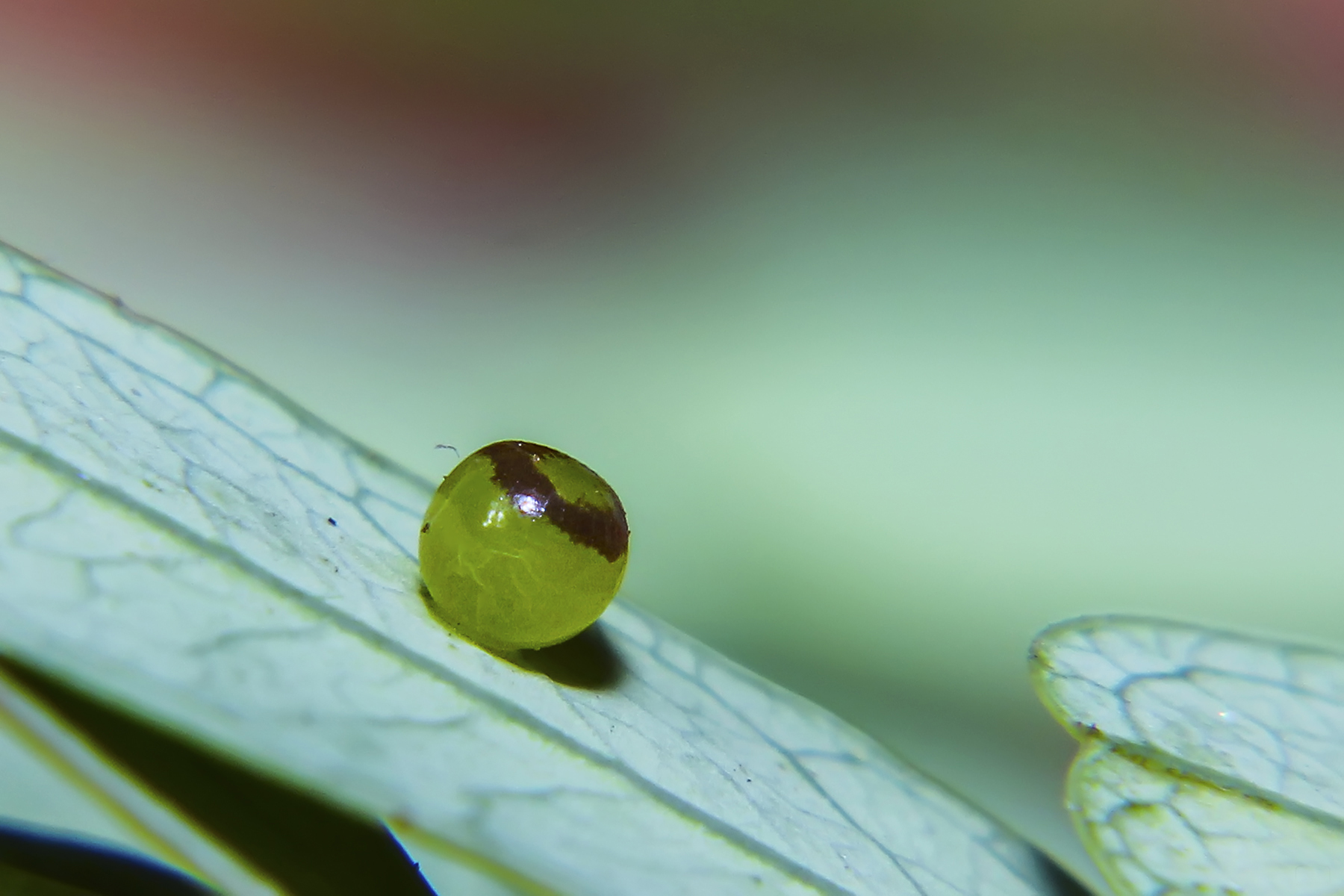
egg of C. solon

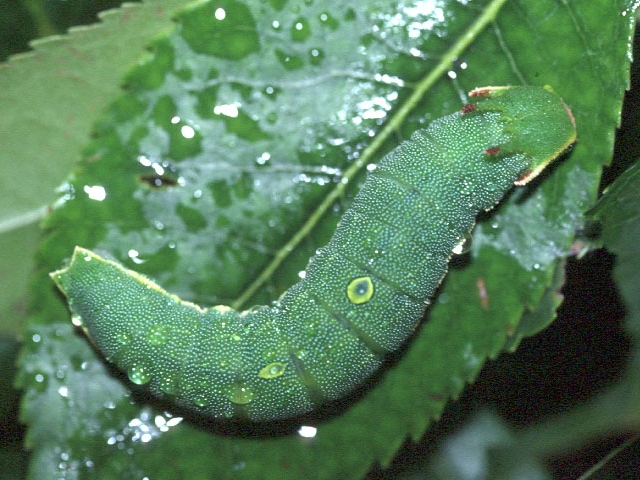
larva of C. jasius

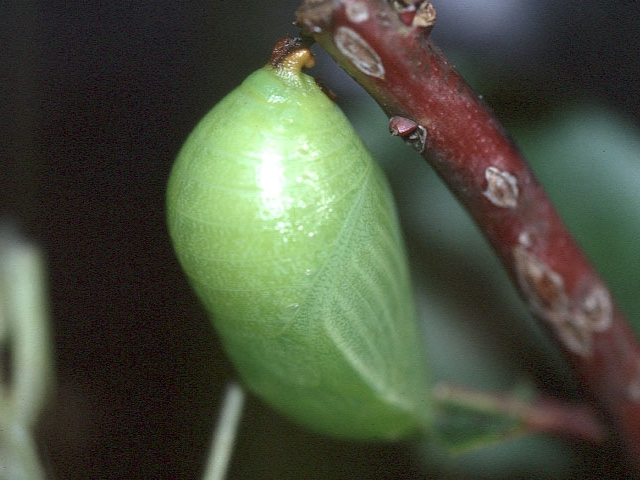
pupa of C. jasius

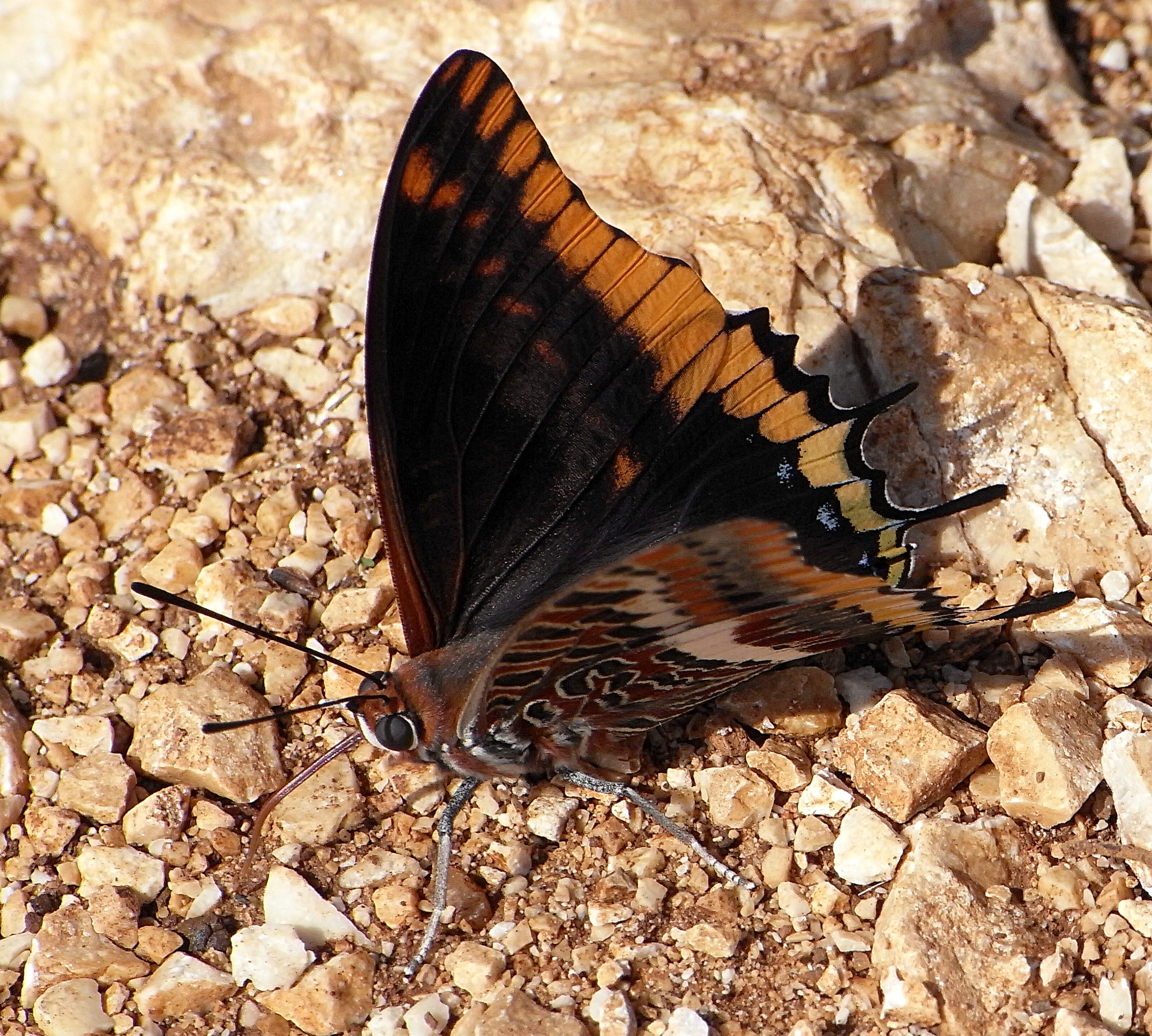
adult of C. jasius

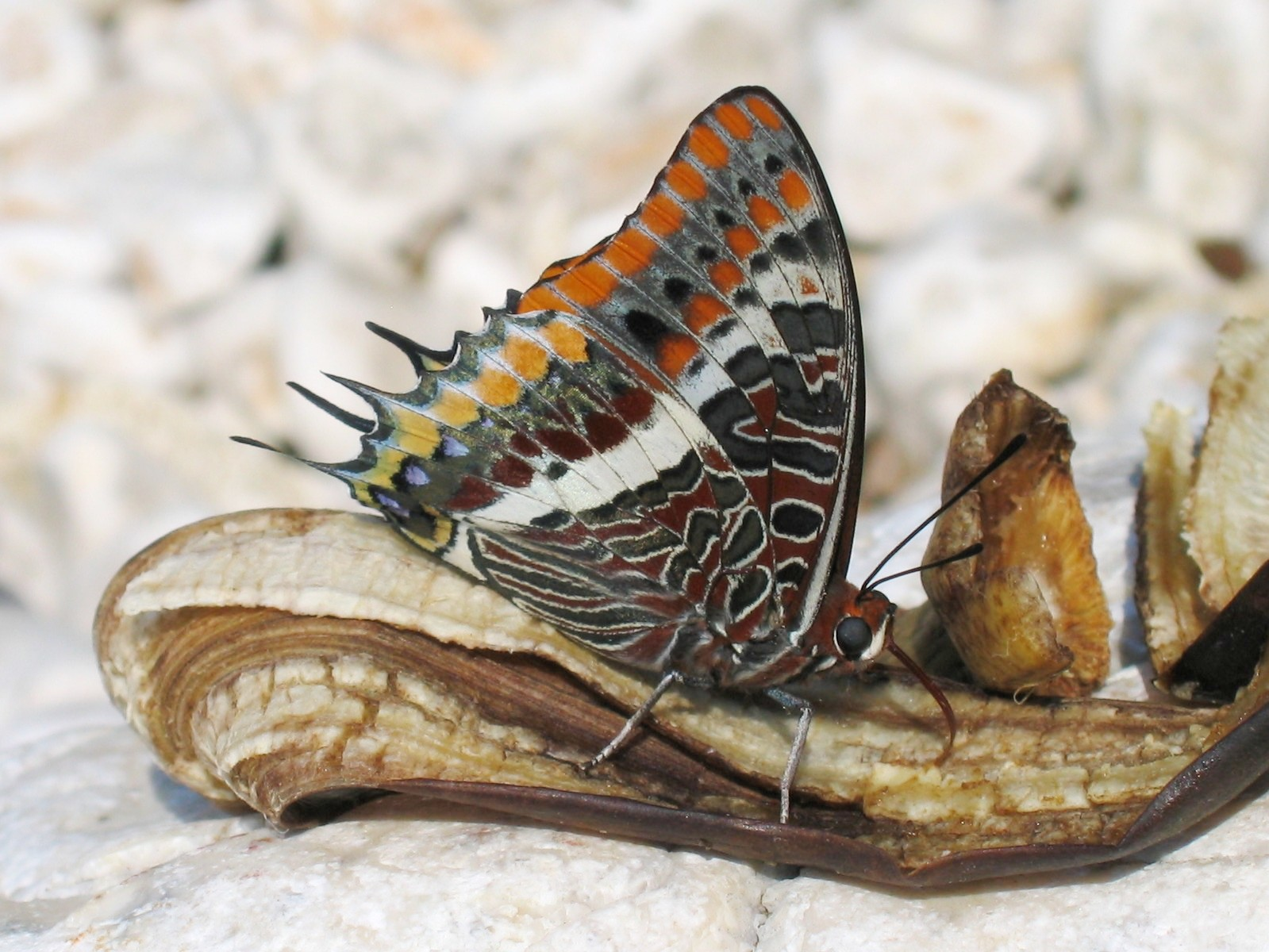
adult C. jasius, feeding

== Description of the imago ==
Adult Charaxes have a robust thorax and abdomen. Their wingspan is around 8 to 10 cm. The ground colours of the wing uppersides vary from tawny to black to pale. Wing markings may be spots, bars or bands of white, orange or blue. Some species have metallic blue spots and others have an overall iridescent, metallic gloss. Charaxes zingha is partially red and Charaxes eupale is light green. The males of the Charaxes etheocles complex are largely black and are known as the "black Charaxes".

Various colours and shapes of Charaxes
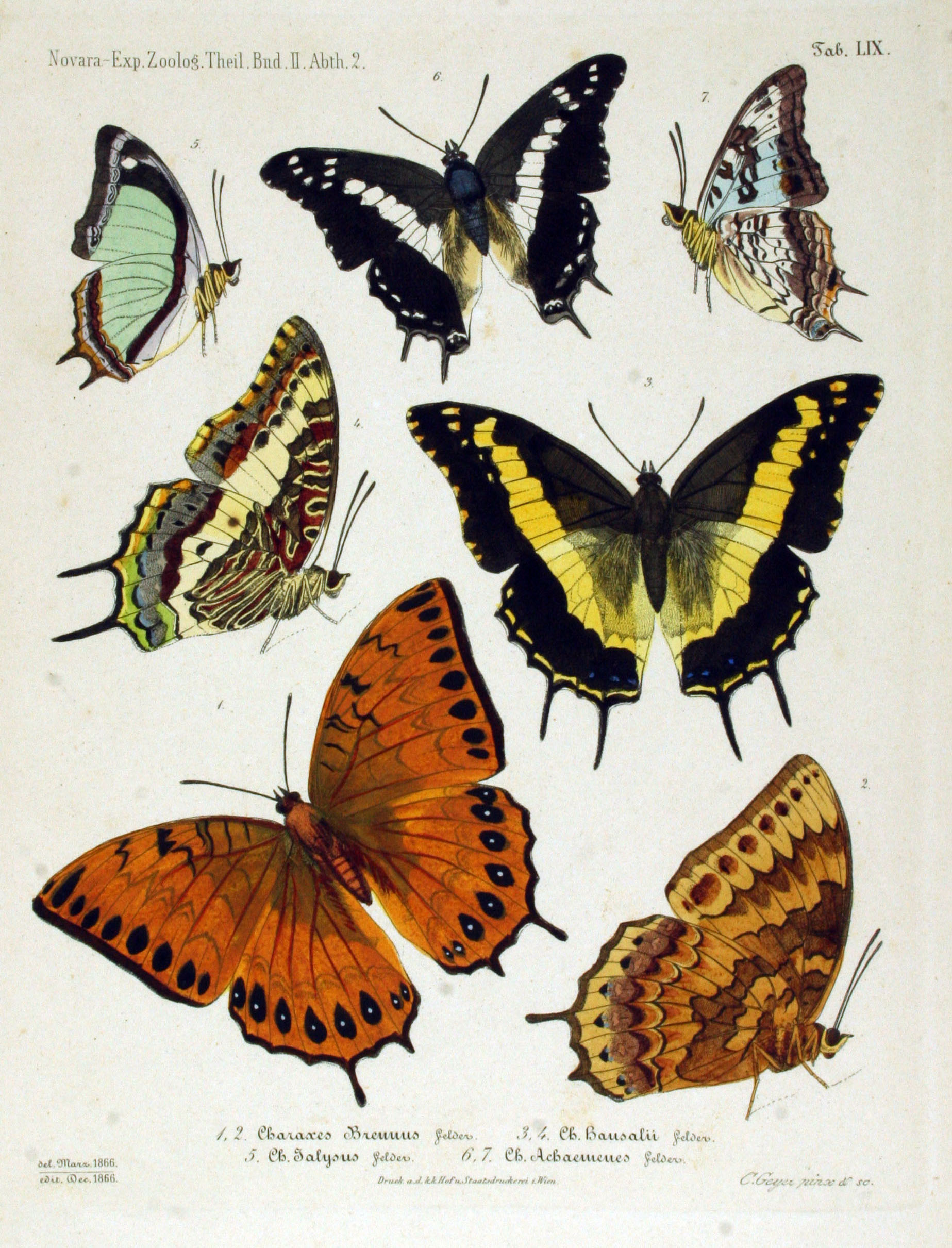
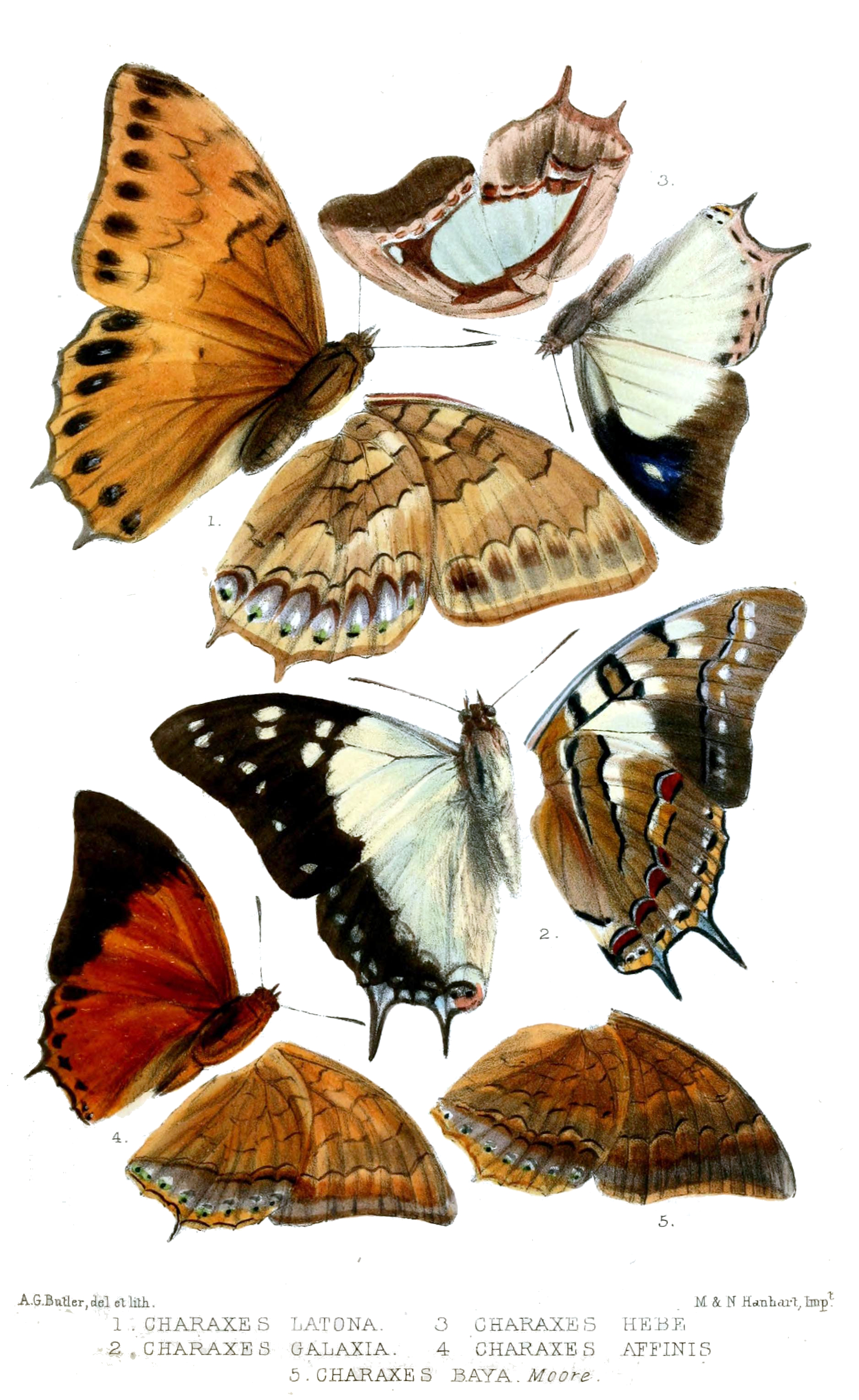
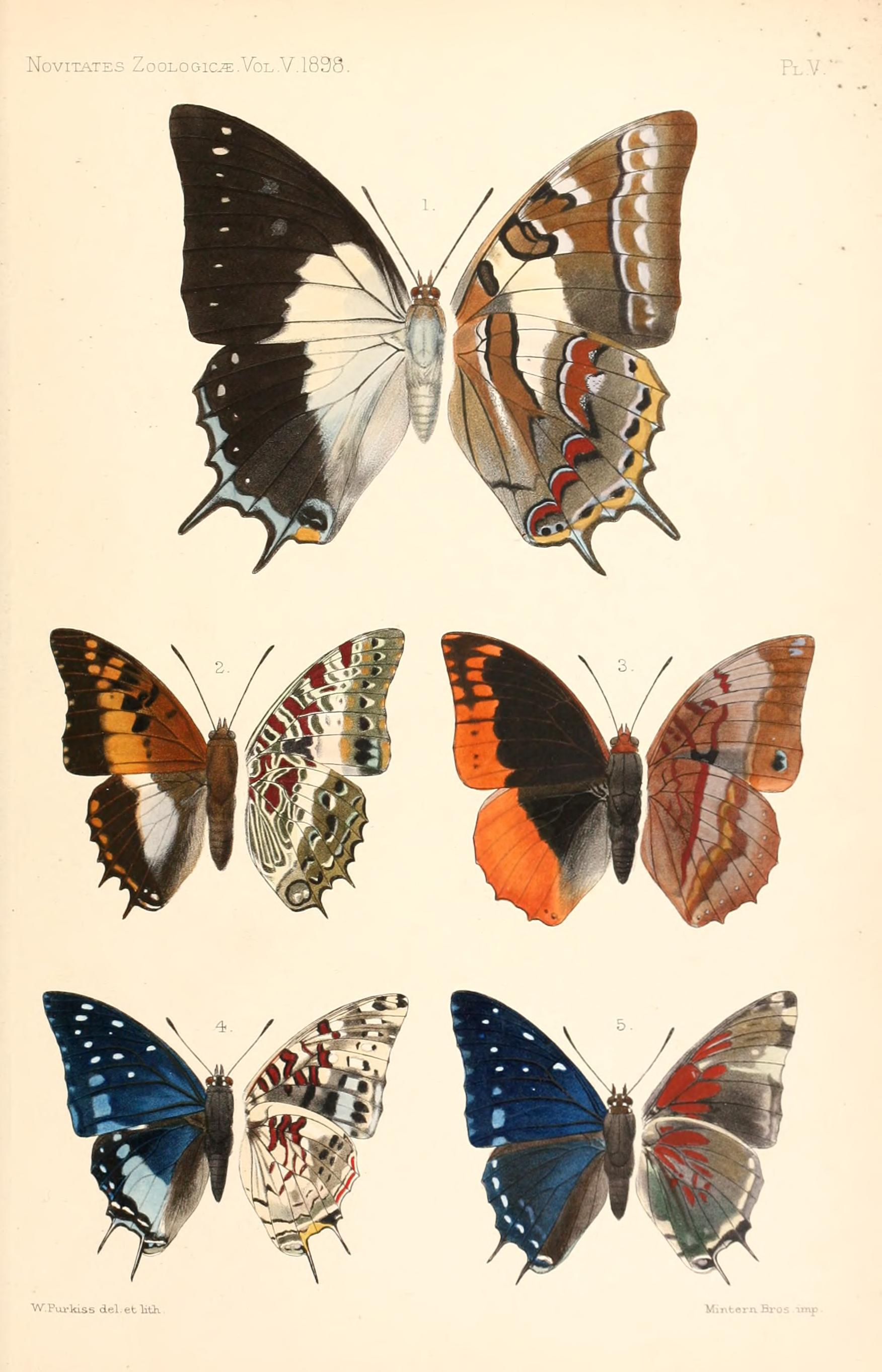

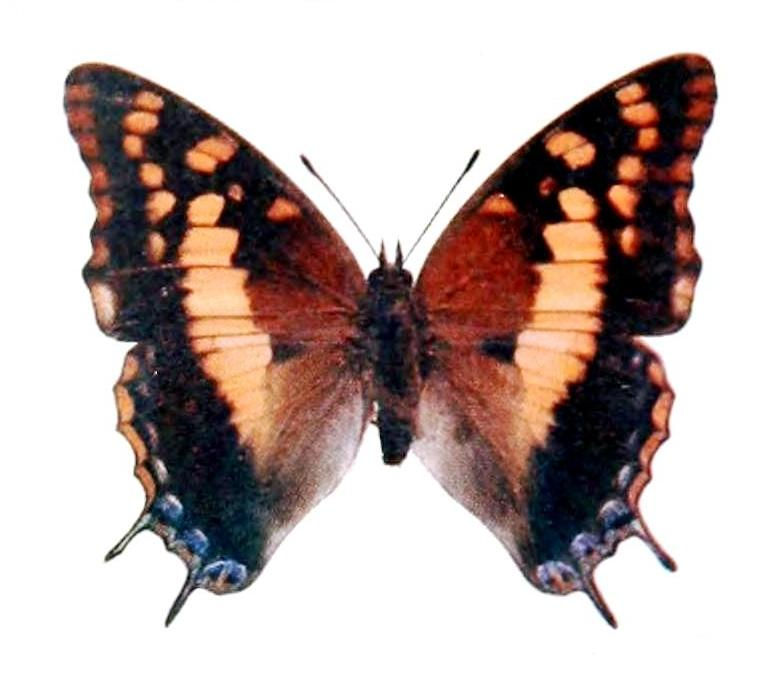
Type 1 female

The outer margin of the forewing varies from being nearly straight to deeply concave. The hindwing is abdominally always longer than costally, and in most species presents a triangular shape. The teeth on the distal (or outer) margin of both wings vary much according to species and groups of species, and is also not entirely constant within a species. The anal angle (wing corner) is in many species more pronounced than the outer margin between the tails, best seen in Charaxes zingha.

The pattern of the upperside is often different in the sexes and in the various species. The females can be arranged according to the pattern of the upperside of the forewing into four groups:

- Type 1: The discal and postdiscal interstices form a forked band, which is generally more or less interrupted at the veins into spots or patches. This is the normal type of female. There are many species in which the male has a similar band, but in this sex the patches composing the band are smaller than in the female.
- Type 2: The upper discal interstitial patches become small or obsolete, while the postdiscal ones form together with the posterior discal ones an oblique band which extends from the costal to the internal margins. This type is found in both sexes of a number of species, and in the males of only a few others.
- Type 3: The upper postdiscal interstitial spots are reduced in size or absent, while the discal interspaces and the posterior postdiscal ones form a broad curved band. This type does not occur in the male.
- Type 4: The band is similar in appearance to that of type 3, but it is composed of the posterior postdiscal and discal interstices and the upper median ones, the band often entering the cell. This type is also confined to the female, and is met with only in one polychromatic species.

The underside is sometimes very colourful with orange, grey and auburn silver areas.

== Sexual differences ==
Sexual dimorphism is among Charaxes a much commoner phenomenon than similarity of the sexes in colour and shape. The wings of the female are always broader than those of the male, and the hindwing is, as a rule, less triangular; the tails are broader, often widened at the end; in some species the male has one, the female two tails, in other the tails of the male are obliterated (absent), while the female possesses such an appendage.

== Taxonomy ==
Charaxes wing

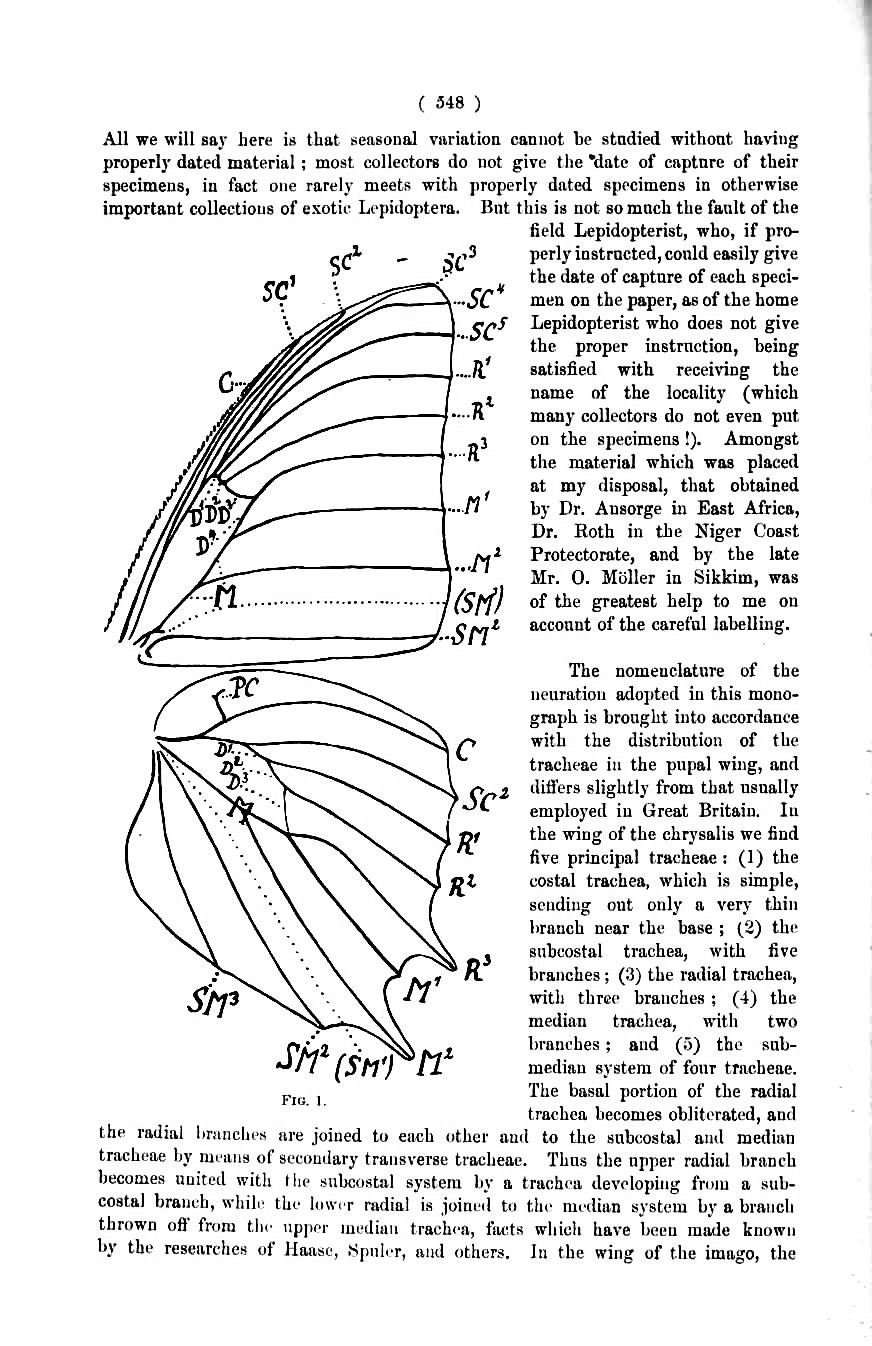
Venation terminology

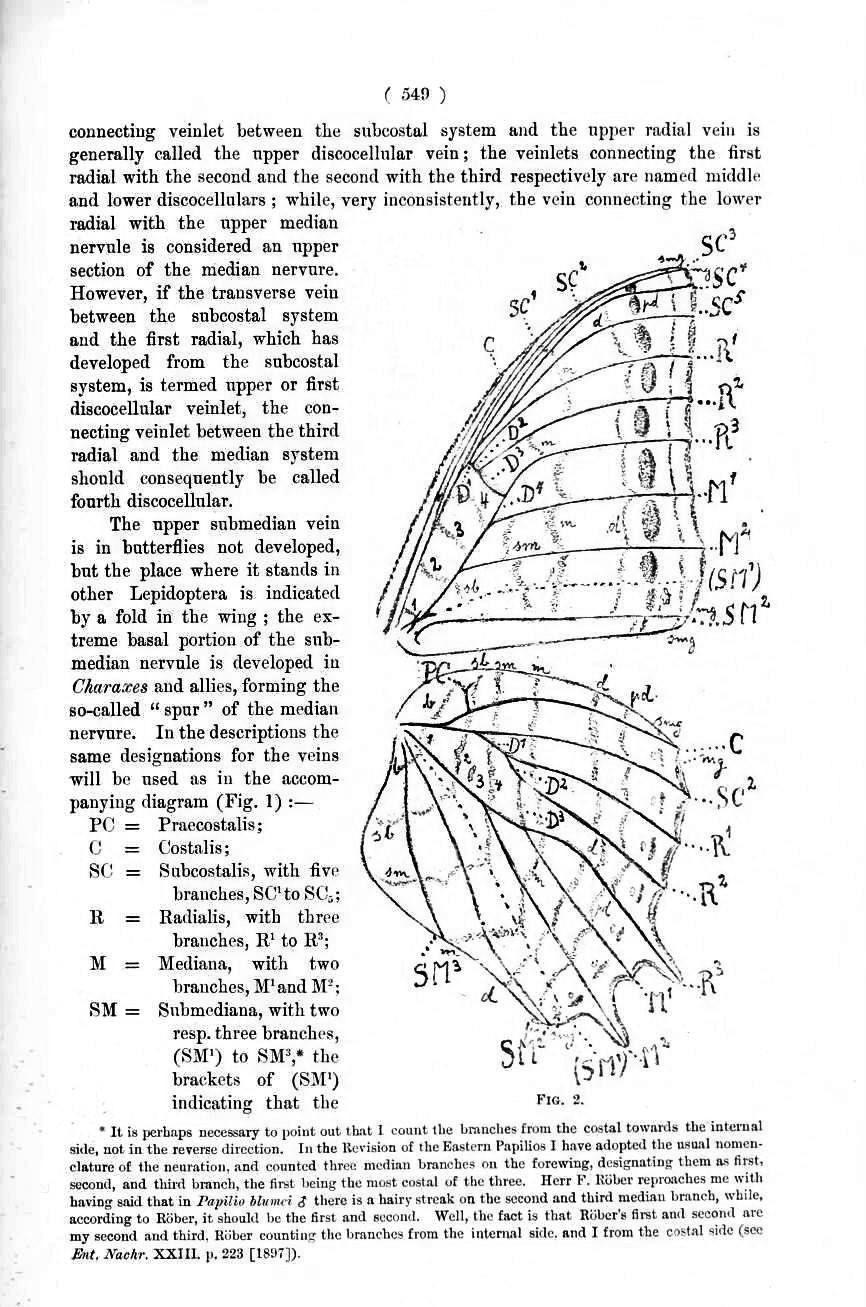
Wing mark terminology

The taxonomy is complex with many ranks (subspecies, forms and variants) and Charaxes demonstrates allopatric, sympatric speciation, parallel evolution and complex mimicry. There have been many rank and placement changes. Splitters, possibly with commercial as well as entomological interests, have named very many forms – an example is Georges Rousseau-Decelle. Many species show geographic and climatic (including altitudinal) clines. An additional problem is the publication of new taxa in journals which are not peer reviewed.

"No group of African butterflies arouses stronger emotions than Charaxes. Gaining an understanding of their phylogenetic relationships will add a new chapter to their convoluted literature".

Significant monographs on the taxonomy of Charaxes include:

- Arthur Gardiner Butler — Monograph of the species of Charaxes, a genus of diurnal Lepidoptera. Proceedings of the Zoological Society of London 1865:622-639 (1866)
- Walter Rothschild and Karl Jordan — A monograph of Charaxes and the allied prionopterous genera. Novitates Zoologicae 7:281-524. (1900) and Rothschild in Rothschild & Jordan, 1898 A Monograph of Charaxesand the allied Prionopterous Genera. (1) Novit. zool. 5 (4): 545-601, pl. 5-14,14a
- Per Olof Christopher Aurivillius — Nymphalidae: Die Gross-schmetterlinge des Afrikanischen Faunengebietes. In: Seitz, A.: Die Gross-schmetterlinge der Erde. Eine systematische Bearbeitung der bis jetzt bekannten Gross-schmetterlinge XIII. Alfred Kernen Verlag, Stuttgart. (1925).
- Victor Gurney Logan Van Someren — Revisional Notes on the African Charaxes. Pts 1–10. Bulletin of the British Museum (Natural History) (Entomology) (1963-1975).

Van Someren studied long series of museum specimens, drawing attention, as had his predecessors, to the variability of Charaxes species over their often vast range, identifying and describing subspecies and isolating new species. This clinal variation is complicated by variation associated with climate (season), altitude and mimicry. Van Someren recognizes species groups, the analysis is in part subjective and the number of taxa remains uncertain.

The type species of the genus Charaxes is Charaxes jasius.

== Species groups ==
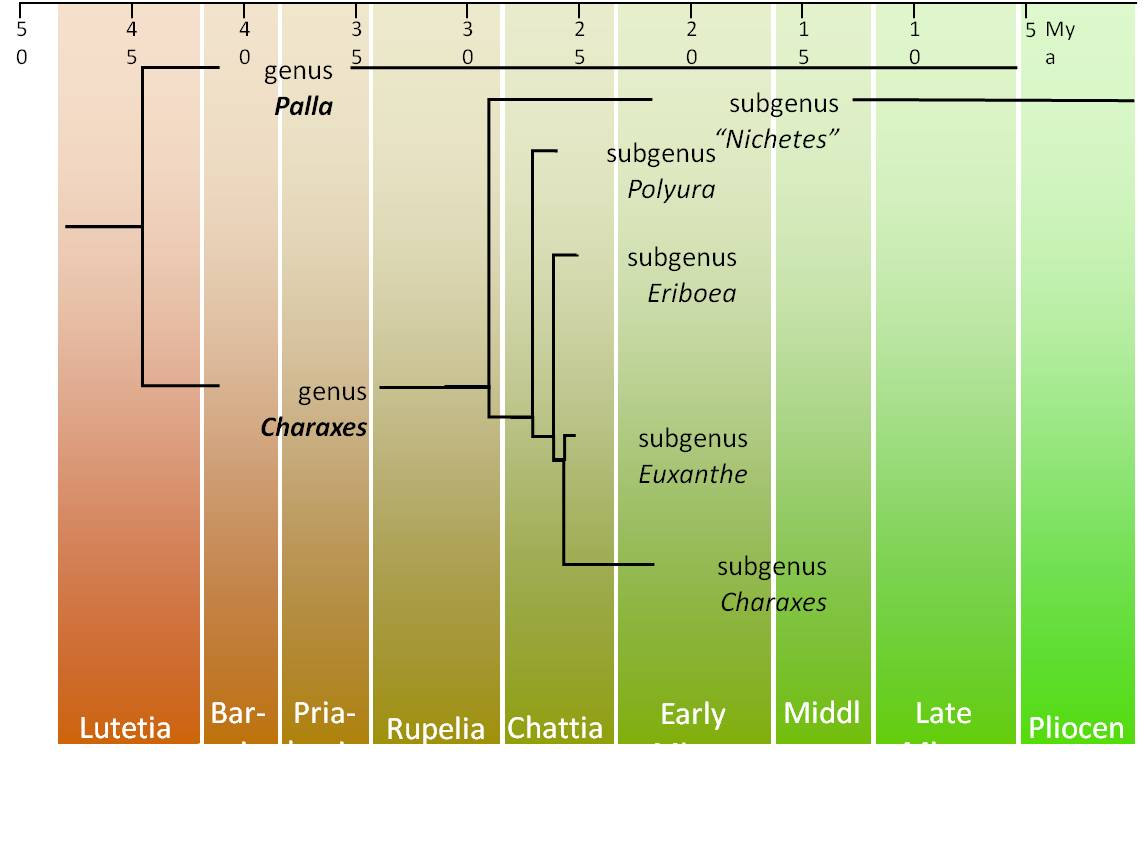
Cladogram of the basal subdivision of the genus Charaxes and its nearest relatives

Defining species groups is a convenient way of subdividing well-defined genera with a large number of recognized species. Charaxes species are so arranged in assemblages called "species groups" (not superspecies, but an informal phenetic arrangement). These may or may not be clades. As molecular phylogenetic studies continue, lineages distinct enough to warrant some formal degree of recognition become evident and new groupings are suggested, but consistent ranking remains a problem.

== Species ==
In older literature, some of the nawab butterflies, such as Polyura dolon, may be included under Charaxes.

=== Species not found in the Afrotropical realm ===
- Charaxes jasius (Linnaeus, 1767)
- Charaxes affinis (Butler, 1866)
- Charaxes agrarius (Swinhoe, 1887)
- Charaxes amycus (C. & R. Felder, 1861)
- Charaxes antonius (Semper, 1878)
- Charaxes aristogiton (C. & R. Felder, 1867)
- Charaxes bernardus (Fabricius, 1793)
- Charaxes borneensis (Butler, 1869)
- Charaxes bupalus (Staudinger, 1889)
- Charaxes echo (Butler, 1867)[stat.rev.2018]
- Charaxes distanti (Honrath, 1885)
- Charaxes durnfordi (Distant, 1884)
- Charaxes elwesi (Joicey & Talbot, 1922)
- Charaxes eurialus (Cramer, 1775)
- Charaxes fervens (Butler, 1896)
- Charaxes hannibal (Butler, 1869)[stat.rev.2018]
- Charaxes harmodius (C. & R. Felder, (1867)
- Charaxes kahruba (Moore, 1895)
- Charaxes lampedo (Hübner, 1823)[stat.rev.2018]
- Charaxes latona (Butler, 1866)
- Charaxes marki (Male: Lane & Müller, [2006]; Female: Turlin, [2015])
- Charaxes marmax (Westwood, 1847)
- Charaxes mars (Staudinger, 1885)
- Charaxes musashi (Tsukada, 1991)
- Charaxes nitebis (Hewitson, 1859)
- Charaxes ocellatus (Fruhstorfer, 1896)
- Charaxes orilus (Butler, 1869)
- Charaxes plateni (Staudinger, 1889)
- Charaxes psaphon (Westwood, 1847)
- Charaxes setan (Detani, 1983)
- Charaxes solon (Fabricius, 1793)

=== Species found in the Afrotropical realm ===
Listed alphabetically. Recently updated taxonomy is referenced within the list.

- Charaxes achaemenes
- Charaxes acraeoides
- Charaxes acuminatus
- Charaxes alpinus
- Charaxes alticola
- Charaxes amandae
- Charaxes ameliae
- Charaxes analava
- Charaxes andara
- Charaxes andranodorus
- Charaxes angelae
- Charaxes ansorgei
- Charaxes antamboulou
- Charaxes anticlea
- Charaxes antiquus
- Charaxes aubyni
- Charaxes baileyi
- Charaxes balfourii
- Charaxes barnsi
- Charaxes basquini
- Charaxes baumanni
- Charaxes berkeleyi
- Charaxes bernardii
- Charaxes bernstorffi
- Charaxes bipunctatus
- Charaxes blanda
- Charaxes bocqueti
- Charaxes bohemani
- Charaxes boueti
- Charaxes brainei
- Charaxes brutus
- Charaxes bwete
- Charaxes cacuthis
- Charaxes candiope
- Charaxes carteri
- Charaxes castor
- Charaxes catachrous
- Charaxes cedreatis
- Charaxes chanleri
- Charaxes chepalunga
- Charaxes chevroti
- Charaxes chintechi
- Charaxes chunguensis
- Charaxes cithaeron
- Charaxes congdoni
- Charaxes contrarius
- Charaxes cowani
- Charaxes cristalensis
- Charaxes cynthia
- Charaxes defulvata
- Charaxes dilutus
- Charaxes diversiforma
- Charaxes doubledayi
- Charaxes dowsetti
- Charaxes dreuxi
- Charaxes druceanus
- Charaxes dubiosus
- Charaxes ephyra
- Charaxes epijasius[Stat.Rev.2005]
- Charaxes etesipe
- Charaxes ethalion
- Charaxes etheocles
- Charaxes eudoxus
- Charaxes eupale
- Charaxes figini
- Charaxes fionae
- Charaxes fournierae
- Charaxes fulgurata
- Charaxes fulvescens
- Charaxes fuscus
- Charaxes galawadiwosi
- Charaxes gallagheri
- Charaxes galleyanus
- Charaxes gerdae
- Charaxes grahamei
- Charaxes guderiana
- Charaxes hadrianus
- Charaxes hansali
- Charaxes hildebrandti
- Charaxes howarthi
- Charaxes imperialis
- Charaxes jahlusa
- Charaxes jolybouyeri
- Charaxes junius
- Charaxes kahldeni
- Charaxes karkloof
- Charaxes kheili
- Charaxes kirki
- Charaxes lactetinctus
- Charaxes larseni
- Charaxes lasti
- Charaxes lecerfi
- Charaxes legeri
- Charaxes lemosi
- Charaxes loandae
- Charaxes lucretius
- Charaxes lucyae
- Charaxes lycurgus
- Charaxes lydiae
- Charaxes macclounii
- Charaxes mafuga
- Charaxes manica
- Charaxes margaretae
- Charaxes marieps
- Charaxes martini
- Charaxes matakall
- Charaxes mccleeryi
- Charaxes mixtus
- Charaxes monteiri
- Charaxes montis
- Charaxes mtuiae
- Charaxes murphyi
- Charaxes musakensis
- Charaxes mycerina
- Charaxes nandina
- Charaxes nicati
- Charaxes nichetes
- Charaxes nobilis
- Charaxes northcotti
- Charaxes numenes
- Charaxes nyikensis
- Charaxes nyungwensis
- Charaxes obudoensis
- Charaxes octavus
- Charaxes odysseus
- Charaxes opinatus
- Charaxes overlaeti
- Charaxes paphianus
- Charaxes paradoxa
- Charaxes pelias
- Charaxes pembanus
- Charaxes penricei
- Charaxes petersi
- Charaxes phaeus
- Charaxes phenix
- Charaxes phoebus
- Charaxes phraortes
- Charaxes plantroui
- Charaxes pleione
- Charaxes pollux
- Charaxes pondoensis
- Charaxes porthos
- Charaxes prettejohni
- Charaxes protoclea
- Charaxes pseudophaeus
- Charaxes pythodoris
- Charaxes richelmanni
- Charaxes saperanus
- Charaxes saturnus[Stat.Rev.2005]
- Charaxes schiltzei
- Charaxes schultzei[Stat.Rev.2008]
- Charaxes sidamo
- Charaxes smaragdalis
- Charaxes subornatus
- Charaxes subrubidus
- Charaxes superbus
- Charaxes taverniersi
- Charaxes tectonis
- Charaxes teissieri
- Charaxes thomasius
- Charaxes thysi
- Charaxes tiridates
- Charaxes turlini
- Charaxes usambarae
- Charaxes vansoni
- Charaxes varanes
- Charaxes variata
- Charaxes velox
- Charaxes viola
- Charaxes violetta
- Charaxes viossati
- Charaxes virescens
- Charaxes virilis
- Charaxes williami
- Charaxes xiphares
- Charaxes zambeziensis
- Charaxes zelica
- Charaxes zingha
- Charaxes zoolina
