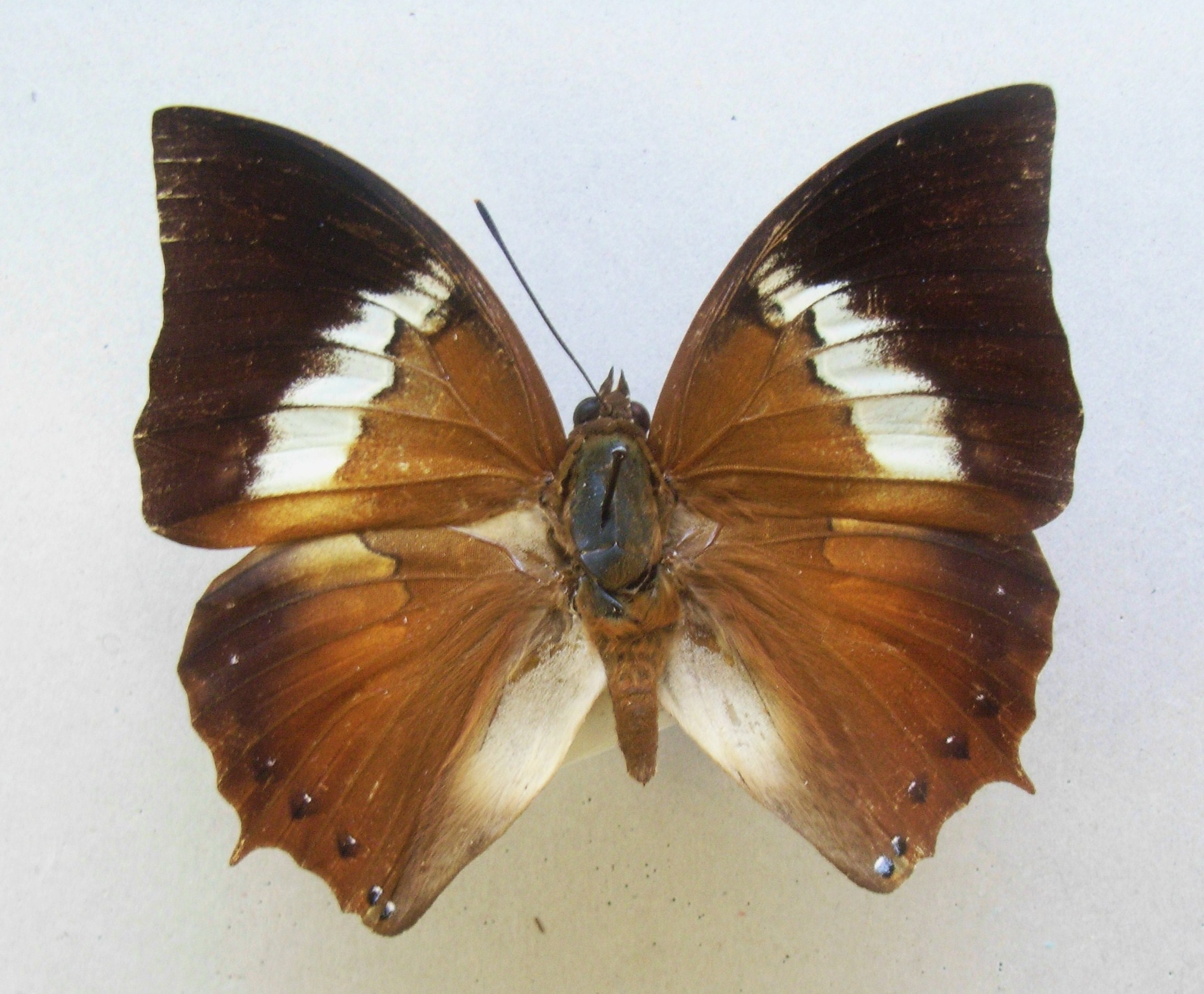
- Charaxes borneensis praestantius

Scientific classification
- Kingdom: Animalia
- Phylum: Arthropoda
- Clade: Pancrustacea
- Class: Insecta
- Order: Lepidoptera
- Family: Nymphalidae
- Genus: Charaxes
- Species: C. borneensis

Binomial name
- Charaxes borneensis Butler, 1869

Synonyms
- Charaxes praestantius Fruhstorfer, 1914; Charaxes vandepolli Lathy, 1913

= Charaxes borneensis =

Species of butterfly

Charaxes borneensis, the White Banded Rajah, is a butterfly in the family Nymphalidae. It was described by Arthur Gardiner Butler in 1869. It is found in the Indomalayan realm.

== Description ==
Charaxes borneensis is a large butterfly (wingspan 88 mm). The male upper side is copper with a broad brown marginal band on the forewings, a median white band and a submarginal line of brown spots pupillated with white on the hindwings. The underside is coppery yellow with darker and lighter stripes.

== Technical description ==
Male. Wings, upperside, tawny or russet tawny, sometimes much shaded with black. Forewing: upper angle of cell mostly blackish, generally with some white scales, which occasionally are so numerous as to form a distinct spot; bar D heavy in front; median bars SC5—R2 joined to the black outer area, seldom isolated, and then obsolete, sometimes also joined to bar D, in which case the white discal band is, between R2 and SC4-5, represented by two or four small spots only; median bar R2—R3 close to bar D, with which it is often fused, bars R3—M2 always present, arched, the second occasionally small, bars M2-SM2 thinner, seldom absent; discal bars all fused with, or joined to, the black outer area, postdiscal interspaces R1—SM2 seldom all marked, then the upper ones minute, more or less white, often only the submedian, double, spot present, seldom all these spots absent; discal interspace white, or slightly yellowish as a rule, this colour mostly extending a little basad along R2—M1, and M2, so that the median bars R3—M2 have in most specimens some white scaling at their proximal side; seldom are these bars entirely separated from the tawny area; the white band is distally concave between the veins, the veins themselves more or less black within the band, the partitions R2—M1 of the band often less than a third the size of partition M2—SM2, the band generally not extending beyond SM2, but in some individuals there is white scaling also behind SM2. Hindwing: median bars C—R2 more or less obvious, with pale tawny or whitish scaling at outside, at least between C and SC2 this scaling palest in the darkest individuals; postdisco-submarginal patches varying in size, patches C—R1 large, but generally ill-defined, the black colour extending basad along veins, about as broad as the interspace between them and the median bars, patches R2—SM2 much smaller, separated from one another, the white submarginal dots situated just at their proximal edge or a little within the black patches; the upper white submarginal dots seldom marked; admarginal line brown: the disco-marginal area often much shaded with black, the tawny admarginal interspaces sometimes obsolete; discal lunules faintly indicated in the darkest examples by dark clouds. Underside very constant in general appearance, blackish bistre brown, outer marginal region pale sepia and olive; sub-basal to median bars conspicuously edged with white, no white discal patches. Forewing: median bars R3—SM2 more or less angle-shaped, bar R2—R'3 more proximal than bar R2—M2; upper postdiscal bars replaced by more or less obvious, but ill-defined, spots. Hindwing: discal, deeply arched, lunule C—SC2 closer to the respective median bar than this is to submedian bar C—SC2; upper two or three submarginal dots absent; upper tail short, triangular, second just indicated. Female: Wings, upperside darker than in male. Forewing: interspace between median bars SC5—M1 and cell filled up with black, of the three black patches thus formed the middle one is much shorter than the others, median bar M1—M2 more proximal than the outer edge of the black patch in front of it, also somewhat dilated; discal band extending to internal margin, where it is, however, shaded with tawny; postdiscal spots R1—SM2 generally larger than in male, the upper two or the second sometimes absent. Hindwing: median bars C—R1 black, the following ones down to M1 more or less vestigial; discal bars R1— SM2 marked as dark luniform clouds, the bars C—R1 completely fused with the postdisco-submarginal patches; discal interspaces white or yellowish white in front, this colour shading off behind into tawny, forming an irregular band which extends to near abdominal fold, that is very indistinct behind; postdiscal-submarginal patches R1—SM2 larger than in male, often touching each other, sometimes their postdiscal portions well developed, in which case the linear, white, submarginal spots stand in the centres of the patches, outer edges of the patches (submarginal bars), however, always deeper black than rest of the patches; admarginal line more distinct than in male. Underside similar to that of male, but proximal portions of discal interspaces cream colour, outer marginal region of both wings also much paler than in male, the discal lunules bordered with cream colour distally; submedian interspaces more or less creamy, at least at bars. Forewing: median bar R3—M1 much more distal than the bars R2—R3 and M1—M2, interspace between median bars SC5—R2 and cell coloured like rest of median interspaces. Hindwing: line of median bars much broken; postdiscal bars broad, deeply triangularly concave, proximally shading into the raw umber colour of the postdiscal interspaces, bar SC2— R1 sometimes absent; upper tail 7 mm. long, not spatulate, second tail just indicated. Length of forewing: male, 41 –45 mm.: female, 47–50 mm. Hab. Borneo Sumatra; Malay Peninsula; much rarer than Ch. polyxena.

== Subspecies ==
- C. b. borneensis (Borneo)
- C. b. daemoniacus Fruhstorfer, 1914 (Sumatra)
- C. b. praestantius Fruhstorfer, 1914 (Peninsular Malaya)
- C. b. vandepolli Lathy, 1913 (Nias)
