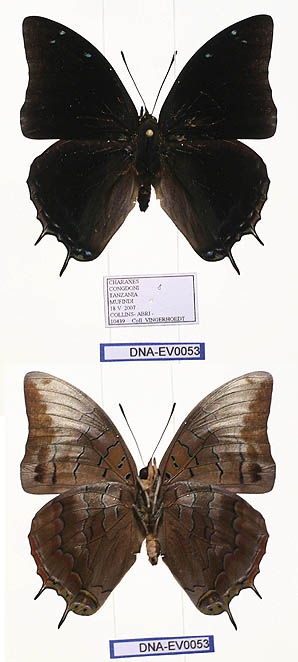

Scientific classification
- Kingdom: Animalia
- Phylum: Arthropoda
- Clade: Pancrustacea
- Class: Insecta
- Order: Lepidoptera
- Family: Nymphalidae
- Genus: Charaxes
- Species: C. congdoni

Binomial name
- Charaxes congdoni Collins, 1989

= Charaxes congdoni =

Species of butterfly

Charaxes congdoni is a butterfly in the family Nymphalidae. It is found in southern Tanzania (the uplands from Mufindi to Mwanihana) and Malawi.

== Taxonomy ==
Charaxes congdoni is a member of the large species group Charaxes etheocles.

Closest to Charaxes nyikensis and Charaxes alpinus . Also very similar to Charaxes margaretae. Similar to Charaxes mccleeryi but smaller and with shorter tails (many mccleeryi are virtually indistinguishable from congdoni in the adult facies but the genitalia differ).
