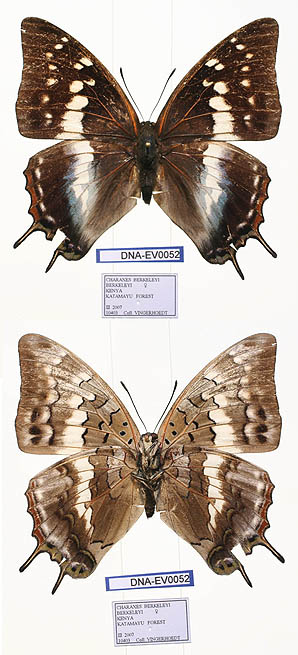
- Charaxes berkeleyi berkeleyi

Scientific classification
- Kingdom: Animalia
- Phylum: Arthropoda
- Clade: Pancrustacea
- Class: Insecta
- Order: Lepidoptera
- Family: Nymphalidae
- Genus: Charaxes
- Species: C. berkeleyi

Binomial name
- Charaxes berkeleyi Van Someren & Jackson, 1957

Synonyms
- Charaxes berkeleyi f. ngonga van Someren, 1969

= Charaxes berkeleyi =

Species of butterfly

Charaxes berkeleyi is a butterfly in the family Nymphalidae. It is found in Kenya and Tanzania.

== Description ==
Similar, externally, to Charaxes aubyni but the genitalia are distinctive. Compared to Charaxes aubyni the male forewing has bluer marginal spots are and the underside is darker; in the female the forewing has two rows of pale yellow to ochreous spots and a white, blue-bordered median band which is narrower than in Charaxes aubyni There are two female forms: a common form with brownish underside and yellowish spots on the upperside and form ngonga which has a whitish median band on upperside and a silvery grey underside with strongly contrasted black markings.

== Biology ==
The habitat consists of montane and riverine forests.

The larvae feed on Albizia gummifera, Scutia myrtina, Ochna holstii and Ochna insculpta.

== Taxonomy ==
Charaxes berkeleyi is a member of the large species group Charaxes etheocles

== Subspecies ==
- Charaxes berkeleyi berkeleyi (central and southern Kenya, northern Tanzania)
- Charaxes berkeleyi marci Congdon & Collins, 1998 (northern Tanzania)
- Charaxes berkeleyi masaba van Someren, 1969 (Kenya: west to the area ranging from Kaptagat to the eastern slopes of Mount Elgon)
