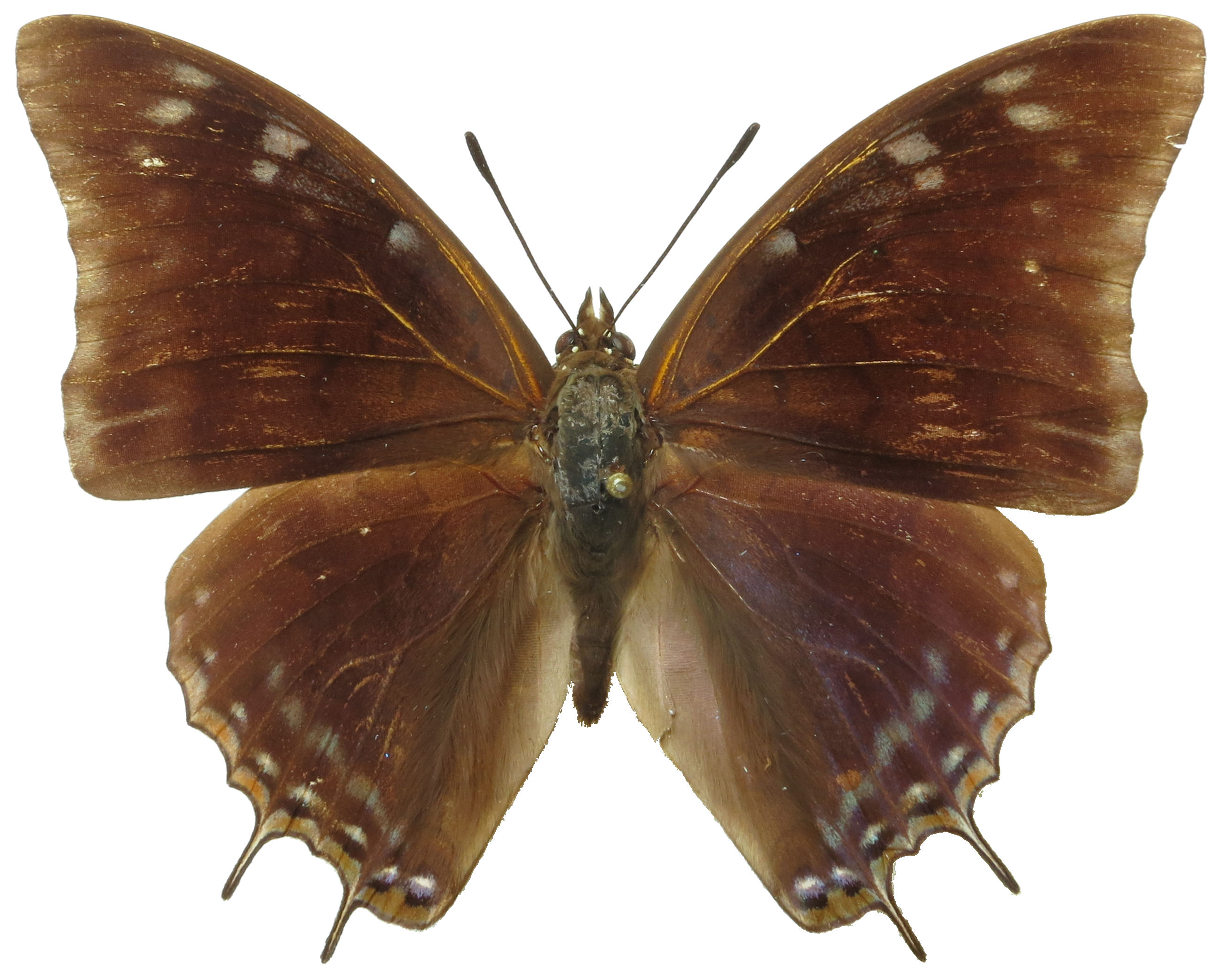
- Charaxes viola picta male from the CAR

Scientific classification
- Kingdom: Animalia
- Phylum: Arthropoda
- Clade: Pancrustacea
- Class: Insecta
- Order: Lepidoptera
- Family: Nymphalidae
- Genus: Charaxes
- Species: C. viola

Binomial name
- Charaxes viola Butler, 1866

Synonyms
- Charaxes chiron Staudinger, 1886; Charaxes etheocles etheocles f. picta Rothschild, 1900; Charaxes etheocles etheocles f. vansomereni Poulton, 1926; Charaxes etheocles f. splendens Rousseau-Decelle, 1938; Charaxes etheocles f. illuminata Rousseau-Decelle, 1938

= Charaxes viola =

Savanna demon charaxes

Species of butterfly

Charaxes viola, the savanna demon charaxes, is a butterfly in the family Nymphalidae. It is found in Senegal, Gambia, Guinea-Bissau, Guinea, Burkina Faso, Sierra Leone, Ivory Coast, Ghana, Togo, Nigeria, Chad, Cameroon, the Republic of the Congo, the Central African Republic, Chad, the Democratic Republic of the Congo, Sudan, Uganda and Kenya. The habitat consists of dry savanna and dry forests.

Adults are attracted to fallen mangoes.

The larvae feed on Entada gigas, Acacia mellifera, Albizia adianthifolia, Albizia coriaria, Entada abyssinica, Acacia amythethophylla, Albizia gummifera and Entada sudanica.

== Description ==
Female. Upperside — front wings brown; outer margin reddish; a broad ferruginous band near the hind margin, interrupted above by a brown patch and by the nervures. Hindwings, basal half brown, apical half white tinted with blue green; outer margin brown, with orange upper edging, green below the outer tail; a submarginal row of violaceous lunules; two black spots at the anal angle. Underside only differs from C. ethalion in the brighter red of the submarginal lunules, in the central white band being only indicated by a paler shade of brown, and the less distinct black markings.

== Taxonomy ==
Charaxes viola is a member of the large species group Charaxes etheocles.

== Subspecies ==
- Charaxes viola viola (Senegal, Gambia, Guinea-Bissau, Guinea, Burkina Faso, Sierra Leone, Ivory Coast, Ghana, Togo, western and northern Nigeria, Cameroon, Chad)
- Charaxes viola picta van Someren & Jackson, 1952 (eastern Nigeria, mountains of Cameroon, Congo, Central African Republic, north-eastern Democratic Republic of the Congo, southern Sudan, northern Uganda, north-western Kenya)

Torben Larsen developed a species numbering system for his 2005 publication Butterflies of West Africa. The nominate subspecies is #770. The 'Larsen' numbers have since been used with permission in A Sharp Eye on Butterflies of Ghana.
