= Charaxes usambarae =

Scientific classification
- Kingdom: Animalia
- Phylum: Arthropoda
- Class: Insecta
- Order: Lepidoptera
- Family: Nymphalidae
- Genus: Charaxes
- Species: C. usambarae

Binomial name
- Charaxes usambarae van Someren & Jackson, 1952

Synonyms
- Charaxes pembanus usambarae van Someren & Jackson, 1952; Charaxes usambarae f. mariae Mollet, 1974; Charaxes usambarae f. collinsi van Someren, 1975; Charaxes usambarae maridadi f. pseudorosae Collins, 1987; Charaxes usambarae maridadi f. bella Collins, 1987

Species of butterfly

Charaxes usambarae is a butterfly in the family Nymphalidae. It is found in Tanzania. The habitat consists of lowland, sub-montane and montane forests.

The larvae feed on Albizia - A. zimmermannii and A. gummifera.

== Subspecies ==
- Charaxes usambarae usambarae (north-eastern Tanzania)
- Charaxes usambarae maridadi Collins, 1987 (north-eastern Tanzania)

== Taxonomy ==
Charaxes usambarae is a member of the large species group Charaxes etheocles. It was first described as a subspecies of Charaxes pembanus.

Differs from Charaxes mccleeryi in the more dentate wing margins
