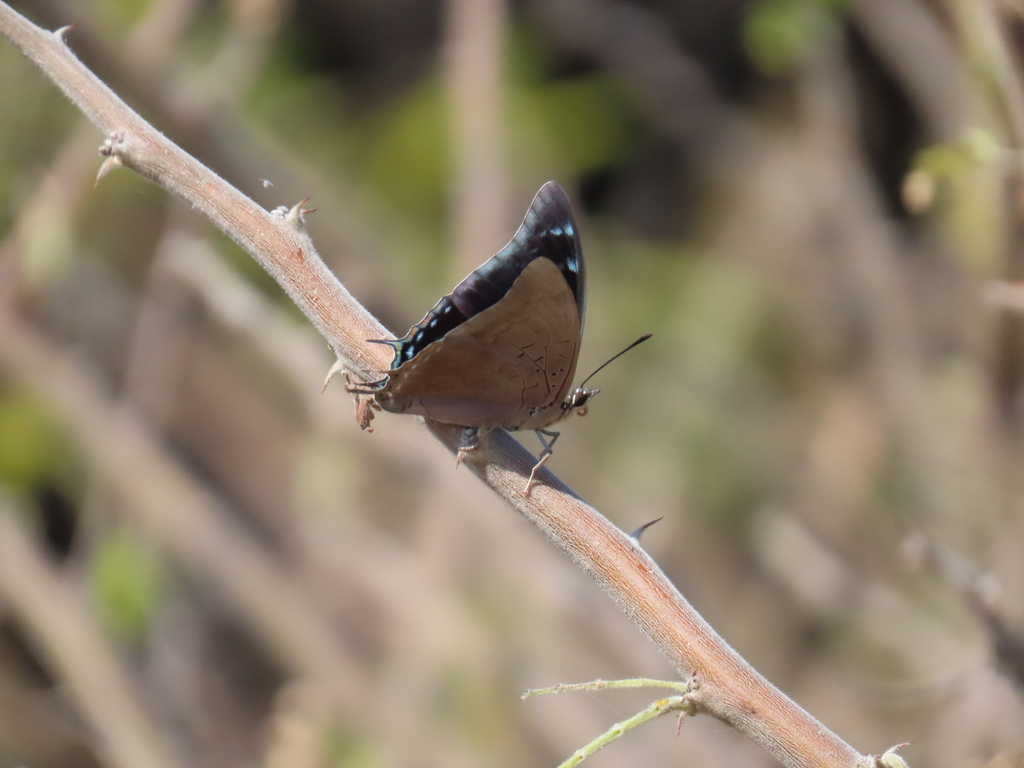

Scientific classification
- Kingdom: Animalia
- Phylum: Arthropoda
- Class: Insecta
- Order: Lepidoptera
- Family: Nymphalidae
- Genus: Charaxes
- Species: C. brainei

Binomial name
- Charaxes brainei van Son, 1966

Synonyms
- Charaxes viola brainei van Son, 1966

= Charaxes brainei =

Species of butterfly

Charaxes brainei, the Braine's charaxes, is a butterfly in the family Nymphalidae. It is found in north-eastern Namibia, southern Angola and north-western Botswana.

== Description ==
The female forewing upperside differs from that of Charaxes vansoni in a suffusion of blue into the postdiscal spots. The discal band of the hindwing is similarly suffused blue, and there is slight violaceous shade on the hindwing underside

== Biology ==
The habitat consists of dry savanna. Flies from October to June; commonest in March and April Adults are attracted to fermenting fruit.

The larvae feed on Peltophorum africanum.

== Taxonomy ==
Charaxes brainei is a member of the large species group Charaxes etheocles
