= Charaxes mafuga =

Scientific classification
- Domain: Eukaryota
- Kingdom: Animalia
- Phylum: Arthropoda
- Class: Insecta
- Order: Lepidoptera
- Family: Nymphalidae
- Genus: Charaxes
- Species: C. mafuga

Binomial name
- Charaxes mafuga van Someren, 1969

Synonyms
- Charaxes mafuga f. vetuloides Mollet, 1975; Charaxes mafuga f. incongrua Turlin, 2011; Charaxes mafuga f. venusta Turlin, 2011

Species of butterfly

Charaxes mafuga is a butterfly in the family Nymphalidae. It is found in south-western Uganda, Rwanda and Burundi. The habitat consists of montane forests.

The larvae feed on Albizia gummifera.

== Taxonomy ==
Charaxes mafuga is a member of the large species group Charaxes etheocles
