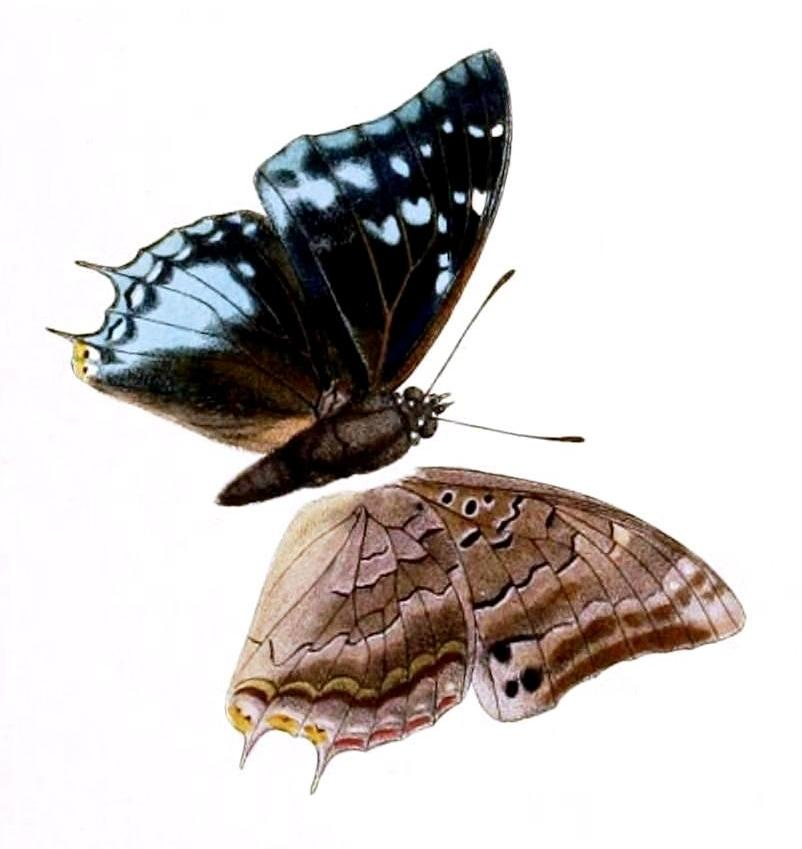
- Male

Scientific classification
- Kingdom: Animalia
- Phylum: Arthropoda
- Clade: Pancrustacea
- Class: Insecta
- Order: Lepidoptera
- Family: Nymphalidae
- Genus: Charaxes
- Species: C. northcotti

Binomial name
- Charaxes northcotti Rothschild, 1899

= Charaxes northcotti =

Northcott's charaxes

Species of butterfly

Charaxes northcotti, Northcott's charaxes, is a butterfly in the family Nymphalidae. It is found in Guinea, Burkina Faso, northern Ivory Coast, Ghana and Nigeria. The habitat consists of dense woodland savanna and gallery forests. It is uncommon.

== Description ==
Ch. northcotti Rothsch. male: wings above black; hindwing behind the apex of the cell between veins 2 and 6 with a blue transverse band 8 mm. in breadth, which at veins 2—5 is united with the thick blue marginal lunules and hence encloses black, white-pupilled submarginal spots; forewing above with large blue marginal spots, only separated by the black veins, and 3 mm. from the distal margin with a row of 8 blue (or at the costal margin white) submarginal spots, of which the last two (in la and lb) are more or less united to the marginal spots; in the basal part of cellules 2—6 and in the apex of the cell there are also blue spots. Under surface coloured and marked as in ethalion. Female unknown. Ashanti.

== Taxonomy ==
Charaxes northcotti is a member of the large species group Charaxes etheocles.
