= Charaxes baileyi =

Scientific classification
- Kingdom: Animalia
- Phylum: Arthropoda
- Clade: Pancrustacea
- Class: Insecta
- Order: Lepidoptera
- Family: Nymphalidae
- Genus: Charaxes
- Species: C. baileyi

Binomial name
- Charaxes baileyi van Someren, 1958

Synonyms
- Charaxes baileyi f. pseudocarpenteri van Someren, 1958

Species of butterfly

Charaxes baileyi is a butterfly in the family Nymphalidae. It is found in Kenya, west of the Rift Valley. The habitat consists of riparian forests and bush

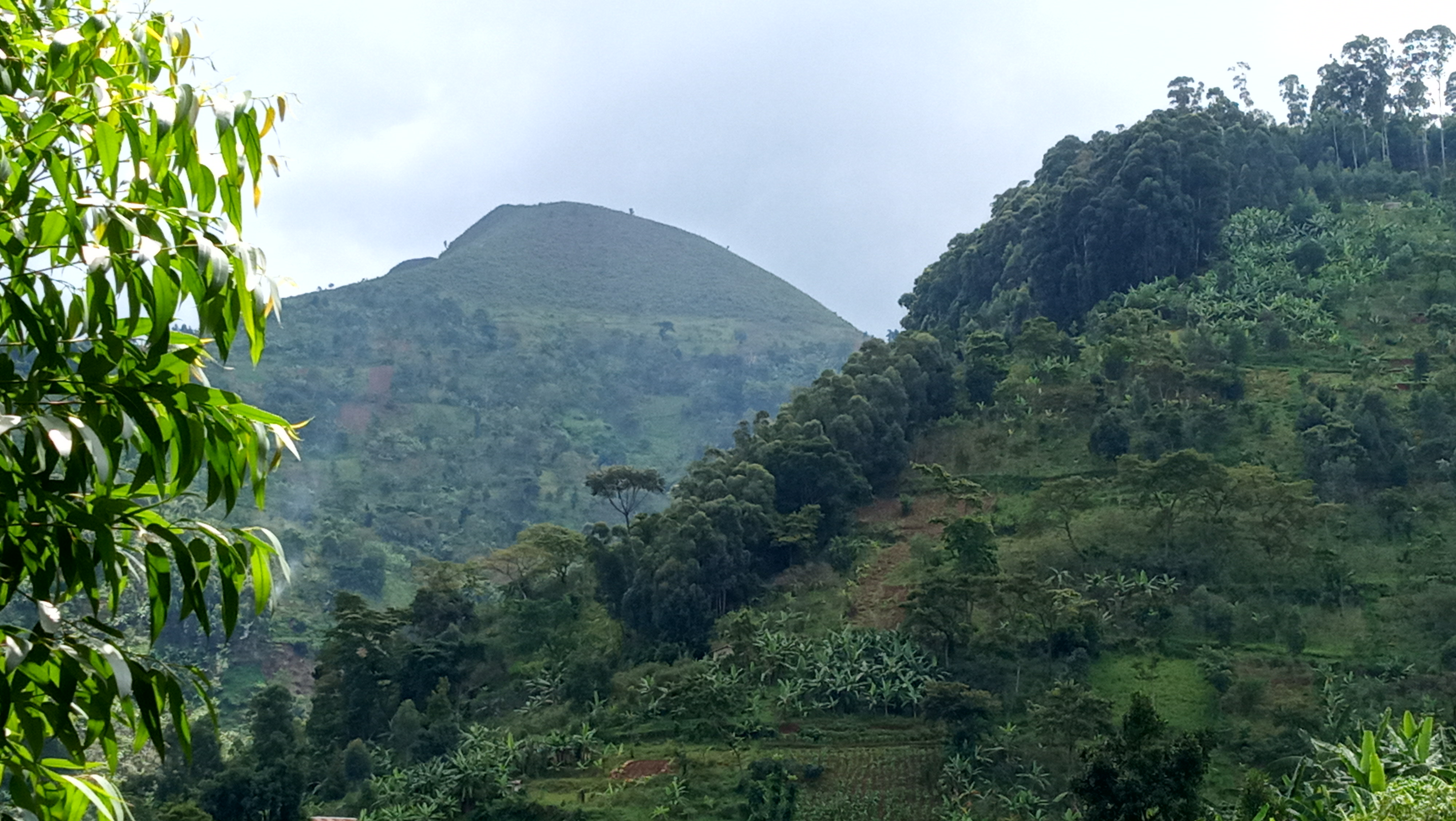
Habitat

The larvae feed on Scutia myrtina.

== Taxonomy ==
Charaxes baileyi is a member of the large species group Charaxes etheocles

== See also ==
- Kakamega Forest
- Mount Elgon National Park
