= Charaxes chepalunga =

Scientific classification
- Kingdom: Animalia
- Phylum: Arthropoda
- Clade: Pancrustacea
- Class: Insecta
- Order: Lepidoptera
- Family: Nymphalidae
- Genus: Charaxes
- Species: C. chepalunga

Binomial name
- Charaxes chepalunga van Someren, 1969

Species of butterfly

Charaxes chepalunga is a butterfly in the family Nymphalidae. It is found in south- south-eastern Kenya and north-western Tanzania. The habitat consists of evergreen and riverine forests.

The larvae feed on Scutia myrtina.

== Taxonomy ==
Charaxes chepalunga is a member of the large species group Charaxes etheocles
