= Charaxes diversiforma =

Scientific classification
- Kingdom: Animalia
- Phylum: Arthropoda
- Class: Insecta
- Order: Lepidoptera
- Family: Nymphalidae
- Genus: Charaxes
- Species: C. diversiforma

Binomial name
- Charaxes diversiforma van Someren & Jackson, 1957

Synonyms
- Charaxes viola diversiforma van Someren & Jackson, 1957; Charaxes viola diversiforma f. albimacula van Someren and Jackson, 1957; Charaxes viola diversiforma f. ochremaculata van Someren and Jackson, 1957; Charaxes viola diversiforma f. caerulescens van Someren and Jackson, 1957; Charaxes viola diversiforma f. cupropurpurea van Someren and Jackson, 1957; Charaxes viola diversiforma f. purpurea van Someren and Jackson, 1957; Charaxes viola diversiforma f. viridicaerulea van Someren and Jackson, 1957; Charaxes viola diversiforma f. albocaerulea van Someren and Jackson, 1957

Species of butterfly

Charaxes diversiforma is a butterfly in the family Nymphalidae. It is found in the Democratic Republic of the Congo (Lomami, Lualaba, Shaba) and north-western Zambia. The habitat consists of tropical evergreen forests.

The larvae feed on Acacia amythethophylla and Amblygonocarpus andongensis.

== Taxonomy ==
Charaxes diversiforma is a member of the Charaxes etheocles species group.
