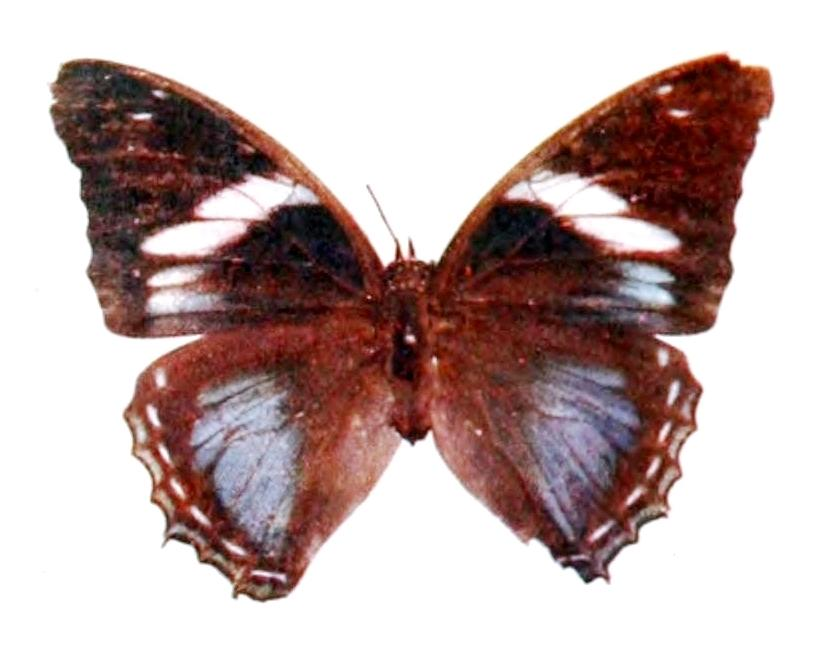
- Female

Conservation status
- Least Concern (IUCN 3.1)

Scientific classification
- Kingdom: Animalia
- Phylum: Arthropoda
- Clade: Pancrustacea
- Class: Insecta
- Order: Lepidoptera
- Family: Nymphalidae
- Genus: Charaxes
- Species: C. phaeus

Binomial name
- Charaxes phaeus Hewitson, 1877

Synonyms
- Charaxes etheocles etheocles f. coryndoni Rothschild, 1900; Charaxes etheocles f. imitatrix Niepelt, 1924

= Charaxes phaeus =

Demon emperor

Species of butterfly

Charaxes phaeus, the demon emperor or dusky charaxes, is a butterfly of the family Nymphalidae. It is found in southern Africa. (Uganda, Tanzania, Malawi, Zambia, Mozambique, Zimbabwe, Botswana, South Africa)

== Description ==
The wingspan is 48–56 mm in males and 50–60 mm in females. Very similar to Charaxes etheocles but forewing above with postdiscal spots only in cellules 3—7 In males of Charaxes vansoni the two subapical spots on the forewing upperside are blue, whereas in Charaxes phaeus they are white and the ground colour of the hindwing underside is pale coppery brown, with the silvery sheen comparatively reduced, extending only from the base along the costa and cell The male differs from that of Charaxes fionae in the paler underside, larger greenish spots on the upperside, and wider pale wing margins. In f. coryndoni Rothsch. the postdiscal spots of the forewing are all present, those in la and lb joined to the blue basal area; forewing with small blue marginal spots; marginal streaks of the hindwing thick and greenish. Under surface with reddish grey ground-colour and weakly marked. Zambesi

== Biology ==
It flies year-round, with peaks from February to May and in spring. The habitat consists of thornbush savanna (thornbush = Vachellia) andBrachystegia woodland (Miombo.

The larvae feed on Acacia nigrescens, Amblygonocarpus andongensis, Erythrophleum africanum, and Tamarindus indica.

Notes on the biology of phaeus are given by Kielland (1990) and Pringle et al. (1994)

== Taxonomy ==
Charaxes phaeus is a member of the large species group Charaxes etheocles
