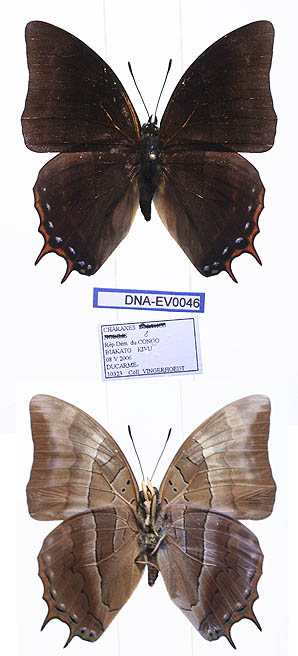

Scientific classification
- Domain: Eukaryota
- Kingdom: Animalia
- Phylum: Arthropoda
- Class: Insecta
- Order: Lepidoptera
- Family: Nymphalidae
- Subfamily: Charaxinae
- Tribe: Charaxini
- Genus: Charaxes
- Species: C. opinatus

Binomial name
- Charaxes opinatus Heron, 1909

Synonyms
- Charaxes opinatus f. xanthia Turlin, 1998

= Charaxes opinatus =

Species of butterfly

Charaxes opinatus is a butterfly in the family Nymphalidae. It is found in western Uganda, Rwanda, Burundi and the Democratic Republic of the Congo (Kivu).

== Description ==
Ch. opinatus Heron. male: almost exactly like that of etheocles in shape and size. Wings above black-brown; forewing unicolorous without markings; hindwing with the tails and a continuous marginal line orange-red and before the distal margin with grey-blue, white-centred submarginal dots; about 6 mm. from the distal margin is placed between veins lb and 7 a transverse row of small, red-yellow, separated transverse streaks. The under surface strongly recalls that of anticlea, both wings having before the middle a darker, almost straight-edged transverse band about 5 mm. in breadth, which is curved round towards the base in cellule lc of the hindwing and more or less completely covers cellules la—lc. female: unknown. Ruwenzori.

== Biology ==
The habitat consists of montane forests.

The larvae feed on Caesalpinia species.

== Taxonomy ==
Charaxes opinatus is a member of the large species group Charaxes etheocles.

== Realm ==
Afrotropical realm
