= Charaxes loandae =

Scientific classification
- Domain: Eukaryota
- Kingdom: Animalia
- Phylum: Arthropoda
- Class: Insecta
- Order: Lepidoptera
- Family: Nymphalidae
- Genus: Charaxes
- Species: C. loandae

Binomial name
- Charaxes loandae van Someren, 1969

Synonyms
- Charaxes viola loandae van Someren, 1969; Charaxes viola loandae f. primitiva van Someren, 1969; Charaxes viola loandae f. basiviridis van Someren, 1969; Charaxes viola loandae f. violitincta van Someren, 1969; Charaxes viola loandae f. vansonoides van Someren, 1969; Charaxes viola loandae f. protokirki van Someren, 1969; Charaxes viola loandae f. instabilis van Someren, 1969

Species of butterfly

Charaxes loandae is a butterfly in the family Nymphalidae. It is found in Angola. The habitat consists of Brachystegia woodland (Miombo).

== Taxonomy ==
Charaxes loandae is a member of the large species group Charaxes etheocles. Considered to be a junior synonym of Charaxes diversiforma by Turlin (2011)
