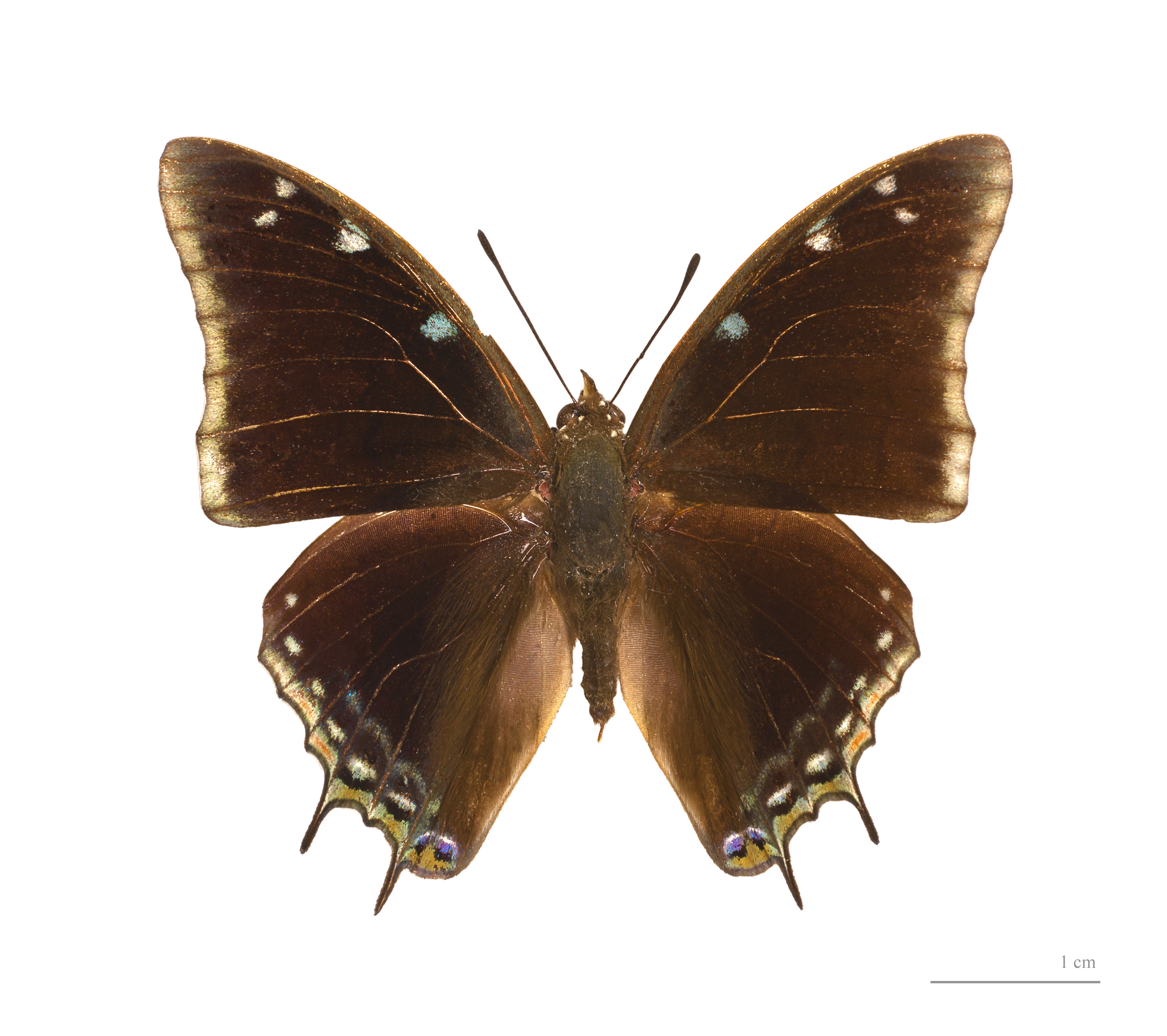
- Dorsal side
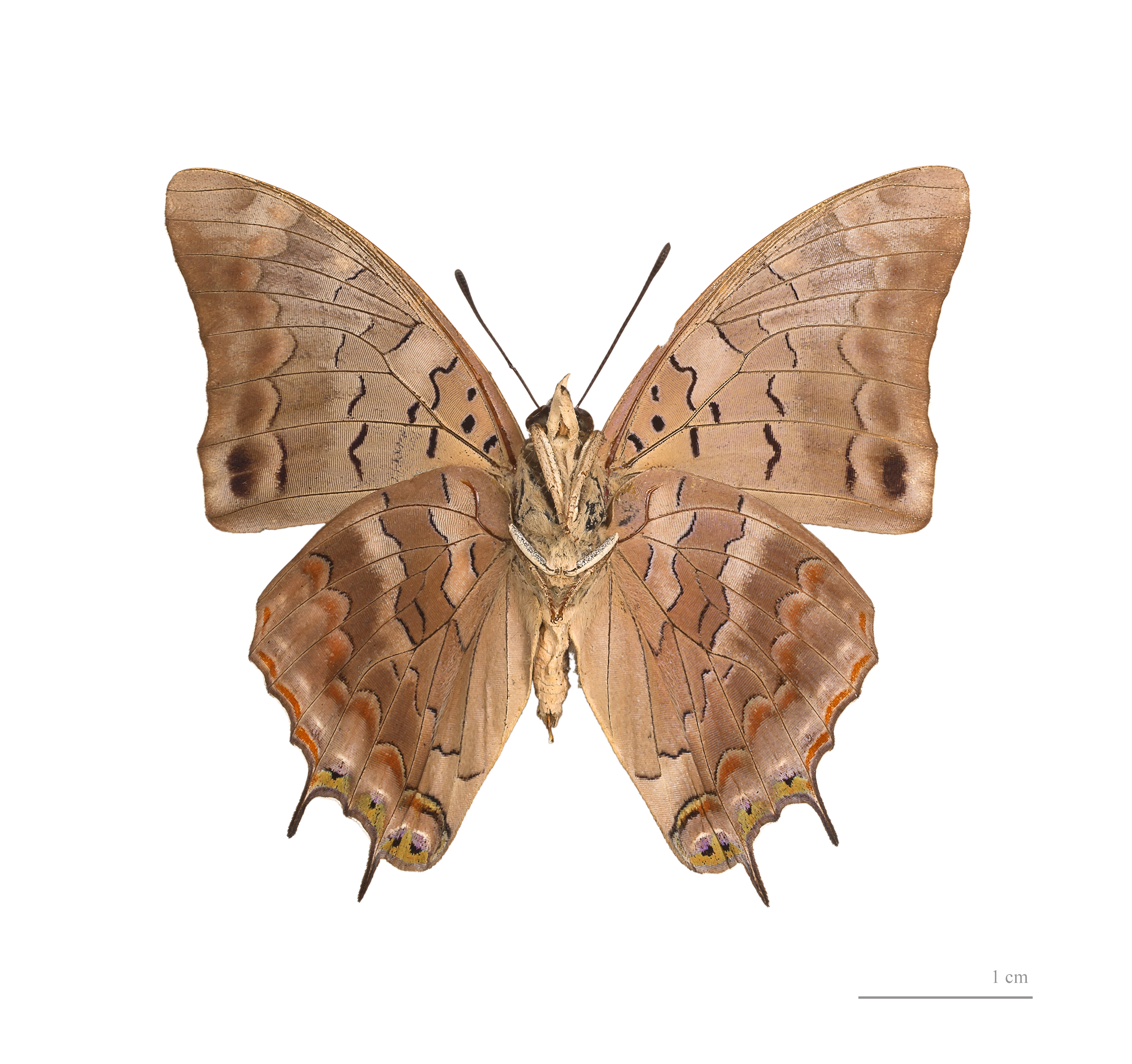
- Ventral side

Scientific classification
- Kingdom: Animalia
- Phylum: Arthropoda
- Clade: Pancrustacea
- Class: Insecta
- Order: Lepidoptera
- Family: Nymphalidae
- Genus: Charaxes
- Species: C. kheili

Binomial name
- Charaxes kheili Staudinger, 1896

Synonyms
- Charaxes kheili f. curvilinea Basquin and Turlin, 1986; Charaxes kheili f. flavimacula Basquin and Turlin, 1986; Charaxes kheili f. caeruleolinea Basquin and Turlin, 1986

= Charaxes kheili =

Species of butterfly

Charaxes kheili is a butterfly in the family Nymphalidae. It is found in Cameroon, Gabon, the Central African Republic and the north-western part of the Democratic Republic of the Congo. The habitat consists of woodland savanna.

== Description ==
Ch. kheili Stgr. male: wings above with black ground-colour; forewing with large blue marginal spots, a row of 8 or 9 blue, or in cellules 6 and 7 white postdiscal spots at 5 mm. from the distal margin, 2—4 discal spots in 3—6, and usually also a blue spot in the cell. Hindwing behind the middle in cellules 2—5 with a somewhat irregular band of 4—5 spots; submarginal and marginal spots small and blue. Under surface as in ethalion.Female unknown. Congo and Niam-niam-land.

== Taxonomy ==
Charaxes kheili is a member of the large species group Charaxes etheocles.

== Realm ==
Afrotropical realm
