= Charaxes pseudophaeus =

Scientific classification
- Domain: Eukaryota
- Kingdom: Animalia
- Phylum: Arthropoda
- Class: Insecta
- Order: Lepidoptera
- Family: Nymphalidae
- Subfamily: Charaxinae
- Tribe: Charaxini
- Genus: Charaxes
- Species: C. pseudophaeus

Binomial name
- Charaxes pseudophaeus van Someren, 1975

Synonyms
- Charaxes manica f. pseudophaeus van Someren & Jackson, 1957

Species of butterfly

Charaxes pseudophaeus, the false dusky charaxes, is a butterfly in the family Nymphalidae. It is found in Mozambique and eastern Zimbabwe. The habitat consists of evergreen forests and the fringes of Brachystegia woodland.

The larvae feed on Brachystegia spiciformis.

== Taxonomy ==
It may be a subspecies of Charaxes chintechi Charaxes pseudophaeus is a member of the large species group Charaxes etheocles.
