= E. africanum =

E. africanum may refer to:

- Eogavialis africanum, an extinct reptile
- Erythrophleum africanum, a legume species found in Savannahs of tropical Africa
