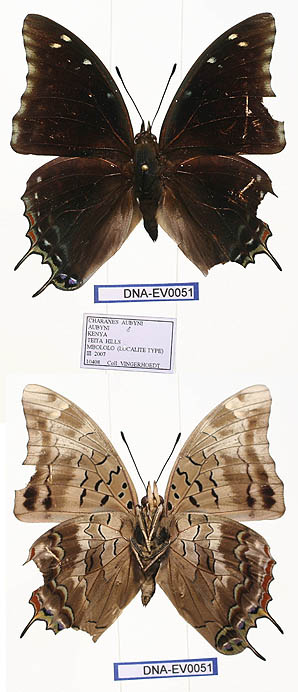

Scientific classification
- Kingdom: Animalia
- Phylum: Arthropoda
- Clade: Pancrustacea
- Class: Insecta
- Order: Lepidoptera
- Family: Nymphalidae
- Genus: Charaxes
- Species: C. aubyni

Binomial name
- Charaxes aubyni van Someren & Jackson, 1952

Synonyms
- Charaxes etheocles f. aubyni Poulton, 1926; Charaxes aubyni ecketti f. ochreotincta van Someren and Jackson, 1957

= Charaxes aubyni =

Species of butterfly

Charaxes aubyni is a butterfly in the family Nymphalidae. It is found in Kenya, Tanzania, Malawi and Zambia.

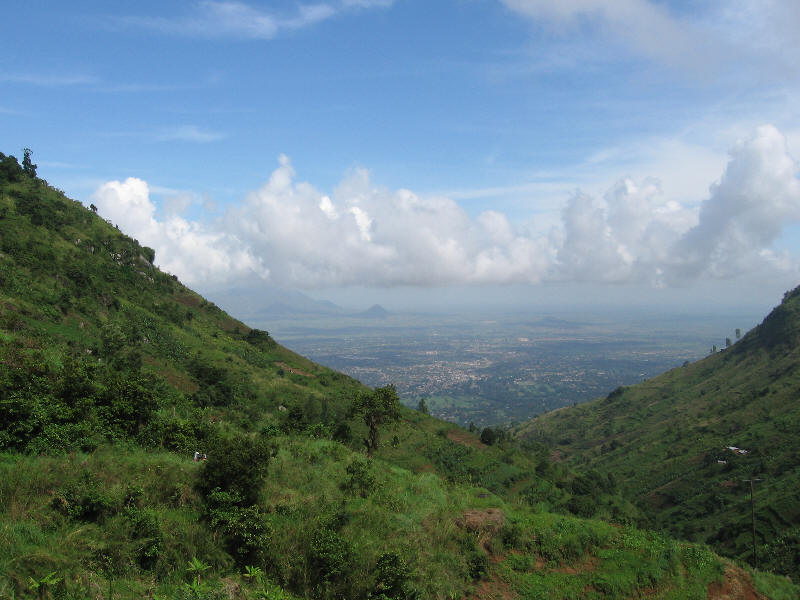
Habitat in Tanzania

The habitat consists of montane and semi-montane forests.

The larvae feed on Albizia gummifera, Albizia adianthifolia and Albizia schimperana.

== Taxonomy ==
Charaxes aubyni is a member of the large species group Charaxes etheocles

== Subspecies ==
- Charaxes aubyni aubyni (south-eastern Kenya, north-eastern Tanzania)
- Charaxes aubyni australis van Someren & Jackson, 1957 (Malawi, southern and south-central Tanzania, Zambia)
- Charaxes aubyni ecketti van Someren & Jackson, 1957 (central and south-western Kenya)
