= Charaxes alpinus =

Conservation status
- Least Concern (IUCN 3.1)

Scientific classification
- Kingdom: Animalia
- Phylum: Arthropoda
- Clade: Pancrustacea
- Class: Insecta
- Order: Lepidoptera
- Family: Nymphalidae
- Genus: Charaxes
- Species: C. alpinus

Binomial name
- Charaxes alpinus van Someren & Jackson, 1957

Synonyms
- Charaxes ethalion alpinus van Someren & Jackson 1957

Species of butterfly

Charaxes alpinus, the montane charaxes, is a butterfly in the family Nymphalidae. It is found in eastern Zimbabwe.

== Description ==
Larger than the closely related Charaxes ethalion with shorter and more robust tails; underside darker and more reddish brown The habitat consists of montane forests in the Eastern Highlands.

== Biology ==
Adults are on wing year round.

The larvae feed on Albizia adianthifolia.

== Taxonomy ==
Charaxes alpinus is a member of the large species group Charaxes etheocles.
