= Charaxes margaretae =

Scientific classification
- Domain: Eukaryota
- Kingdom: Animalia
- Phylum: Arthropoda
- Class: Insecta
- Order: Lepidoptera
- Family: Nymphalidae
- Genus: Charaxes
- Species: C. margaretae

Binomial name
- Charaxes margaretae Rydon, 1980

Species of butterfly

Charaxes margaretae is a butterfly in the family Nymphalidae. It is found in southern Malawi, south-western Tanzania and possibly eastern Zambia.

The habitat consists of montane forests.

The larvae feed on Albizia gummifera, Agelaea heterophylla and Dalbergia lactea.

== Taxonomy ==
Virtually indistinguishable from Charaxes congdoni in the adult facies but the genitalia differ.
