= Charaxes fulgurata =

Scientific classification
- Kingdom: Animalia
- Phylum: Arthropoda
- Class: Insecta
- Order: Lepidoptera
- Family: Nymphalidae
- Genus: Charaxes
- Species: C. fulgurata

Binomial name
- Charaxes fulgurata Aurivillius, 1899 .

Synonyms
- Charaxes fulgurata var. ephyra Godart; Dewitz, 1887; Charaxes etheocles etheocles f. lunigera Rothschild, 1900; Charaxes fulgurata f. mima Riley, 1921

Species of butterfly

Charaxes fulgurata, the lightning charaxes, is a butterfly in the family Nymphalidae. It is found in northern Angola, the Democratic Republic of the Congo (Lualaba, Lomami), north-western Zimbabwe and Zambia.

== Description ==
Forewing above with large marginal spots and 3—7 strongly curved submarginal spots, the extremities of which reach the marginal spots; in addition with 2 or 3 discal spots and a spot in the cell. Hindwing with fine postdiscal lunules and thick marginal streaks, in cellules 4—6 dotted with red. Under surface light reddish brown. Angola There are at least two distinctive female forms.

== Biology ==
The habitat consists of Brachystegia woodland and savanna woodland.

Adults have been observed feeding on elephant dung.

The larvae feed on Erythrophleum africanum and Amblygonocarpus andongensis.

== Taxonomy ==
Charaxes fulgurata is a member of the large species group Charaxes etheocles.
