= Charaxes fionae =

Conservation status
- Least Concern (IUCN 3.1)

Scientific classification
- Kingdom: Animalia
- Phylum: Arthropoda
- Class: Insecta
- Order: Lepidoptera
- Family: Nymphalidae
- Genus: Charaxes
- Species: C. fionae

Binomial name
- Charaxes fionae Henning, 1977

Species of butterfly

Charaxes fionae is a butterfly in the family Nymphalidae. It is found in central, southern and eastern Zambia, Malawi and western Tanzania.

== Description ==
The male differs from that of Charaxes phaeus in the darker underside, smaller greenish spots on the upperside, and narrower pale wing margins.

== Biology ==
The habitat consists of Brachystegia woodland.

The larvae feed on Acacia amythethophylla, Dalbergia boehmii and Entada abyssinica.
