= Charaxes gallagheri =

Scientific classification
- Kingdom: Animalia
- Phylum: Arthropoda
- Class: Insecta
- Order: Lepidoptera
- Family: Nymphalidae
- Genus: Charaxes
- Species: C. gallagheri

Binomial name
- Charaxes gallagheri van Son, 1962

Species of butterfly

Charaxes gallagheri, the Gallagher's charaxes, is a butterfly in the family Nymphalidae. It is found in central and eastern Zimbabwe and Zambia. The habitat consists of granite-boulder hills in savanna.

There are two generations per year with adults on wing from November to December and again from late February to April.

The larvae feed on Diospyros natalensis.

== Taxonomy ==
Charaxes gallagheri is a member of the large species group Charaxes etheocles.
