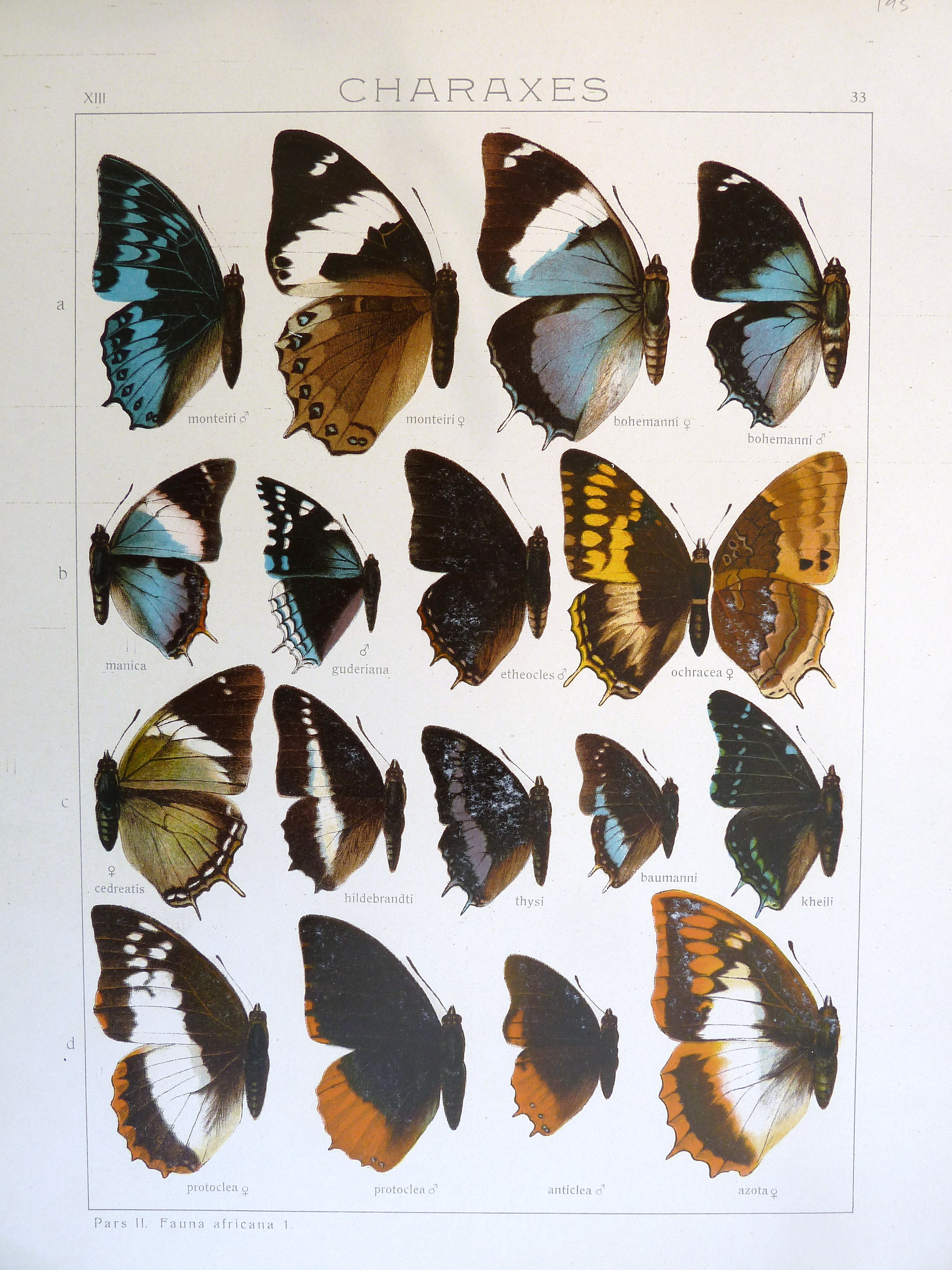
- In Adalbert Seitz's Fauna Africana

Scientific classification
- Domain: Eukaryota
- Kingdom: Animalia
- Phylum: Arthropoda
- Class: Insecta
- Order: Lepidoptera
- Family: Nymphalidae
- Genus: Charaxes
- Species: C. thysi

Binomial name
- Charaxes thysi Capronnier, 1889

Synonyms
- Charaxes thysii

= Charaxes thysi =

Species of butterfly

Charaxes thysi is a butterfly in the family Nymphalidae. It is found in Cameroon, Gabon, the Republic of the Congo and the Democratic Republic of the Congo.

== Description ==
Ch. thysi Capronn. male above black with intensive blue reflection; both wings beyond the middle with a common dark blue transverse band, on the hindwing 6 mm. in breadth, on the forewing somewhat narrower and broken up into spots; hindwing with white submarginal dots and bluish marginal streaks. This remarkably beautiful but very rare species differs from all other African forms in its bright silvery under surface, which is divided beyond the middle by a red-brown, black-spotted transverse band 2—-3 mm. in breadth. The female is unknown. Congo.

== Biology ==
The habitat consists of forests.

== Taxonomy ==
Charaxes thysi is a member of the large species group Charaxes etheocles.

== Realm ==
Afrotropical realm
