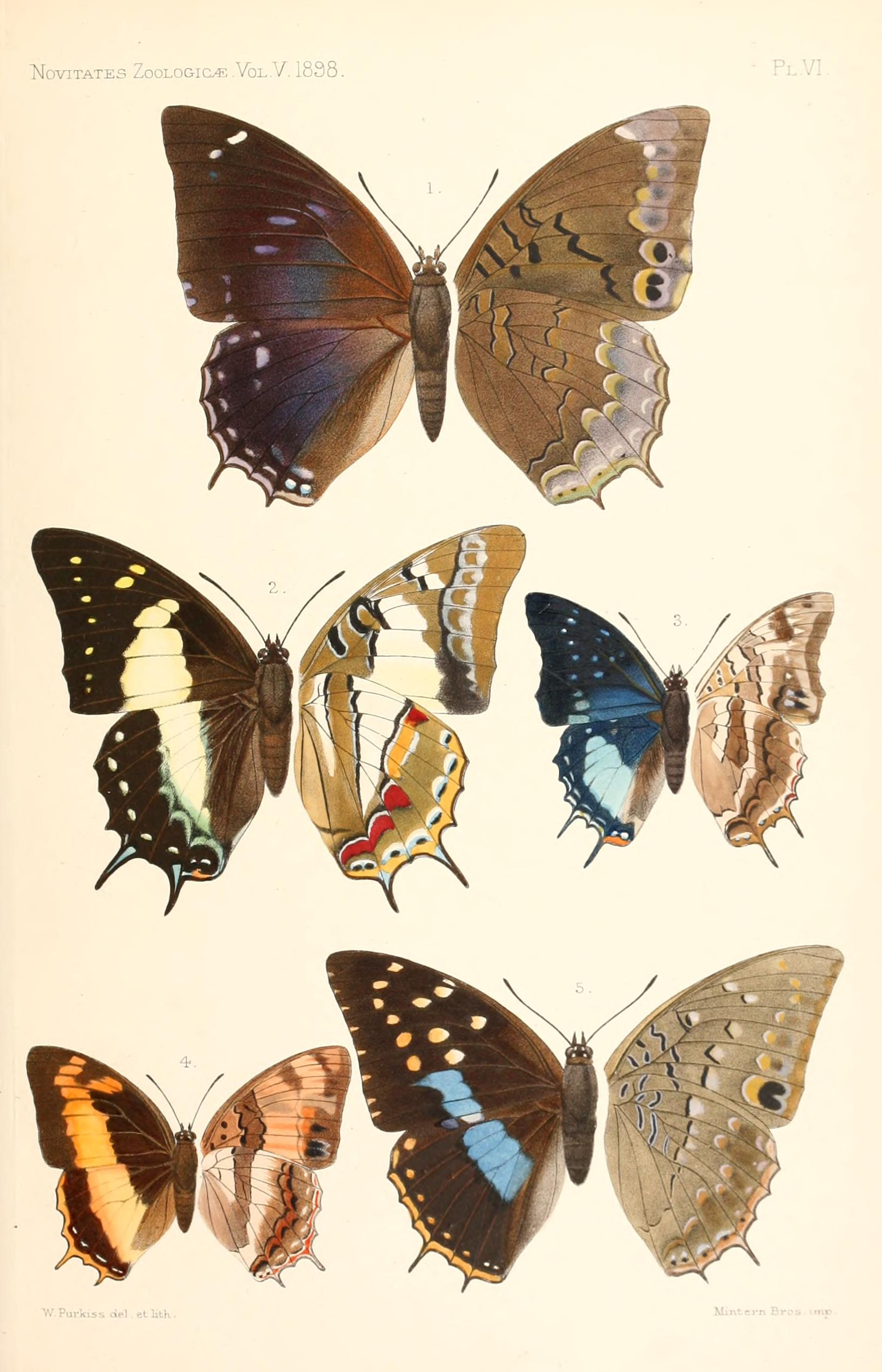
- Figure 3

Conservation status
- Data Deficient (IUCN 3.1)

Scientific classification
- Kingdom: Animalia
- Phylum: Arthropoda
- Class: Insecta
- Order: Lepidoptera
- Family: Nymphalidae
- Genus: Charaxes
- Species: C. blanda

Binomial name
- Charaxes blanda Rothschild, 1897

= Charaxes blanda =

Species of butterfly

Charaxes blanda is a butterfly in the family Nymphalidae. It is found in Kenya and Tanzania.

== Description ==
Ch. blanda Rothsch. In the male the wings are black above, with strong greenish blue reflection. Hindwing above beyond the middle between veins 2 and 7 with a broad (9 mm. in cellule 2), blue transverse band, gradually narrowing anteriorly, in cellule 8 represented by a small, free blue spot; on the forewing the transverse band is continued to the costal margin as a row of small blue spots; these spots are placed about 7 mm. from the distal margin and in cellules 4—6 have white centres; in addition the forewing has small, rounded blue spots in the basal part of cellules 2—6, the one in cellule 4 as usual placed at the apex of the cell. Hindwing above in cellules 2—6 (7) with bluish submarginal and marginal streaks, in cellule lc with two white-centred submarginal spots and a thick orange-yellow marginal streak. On the under surface the black discal streaks in cellules 2, 4—8 forming an almost continuous but not quite straight line, which forms the distal side of the dark transverse band; on the forewing the transverse streaks in cellules lb—4 are not joined together. female unknown. German East Africa: Mikindani. A full description is also given by Walter Rothschild and Karl Jordan, 1900 Novitates Zoologicae Volume 7:287-524. page 471-472 (for terms see Novitates Zoologicae Volume 5:545-601 )

== Subspecies ==
- Charaxes blanda blanda (south-eastern Tanzania)
- Charaxes blanda kenyae Poulton, 1926(Kenya: coast north of Mombasa)

== Biology ==
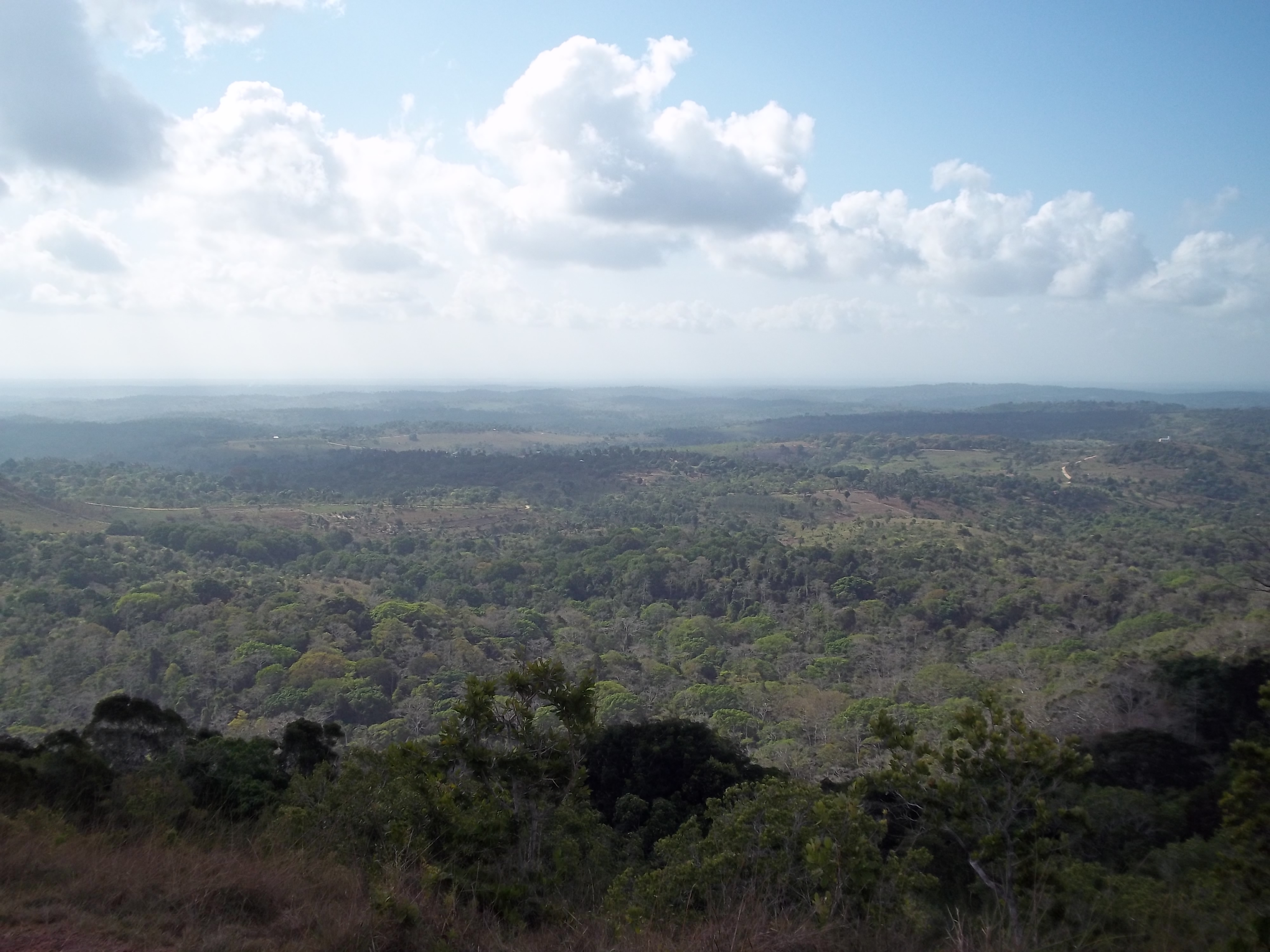
Habitat in Kenya

The habitat consists of coastal forests.

The larvae feed on Dalbergia species and Brachystegia spiciformis.

== Taxonomy ==
Charaxes blanda is a member of the large species group Charaxes etheocles

== Realm ==
Afrotropical realm
