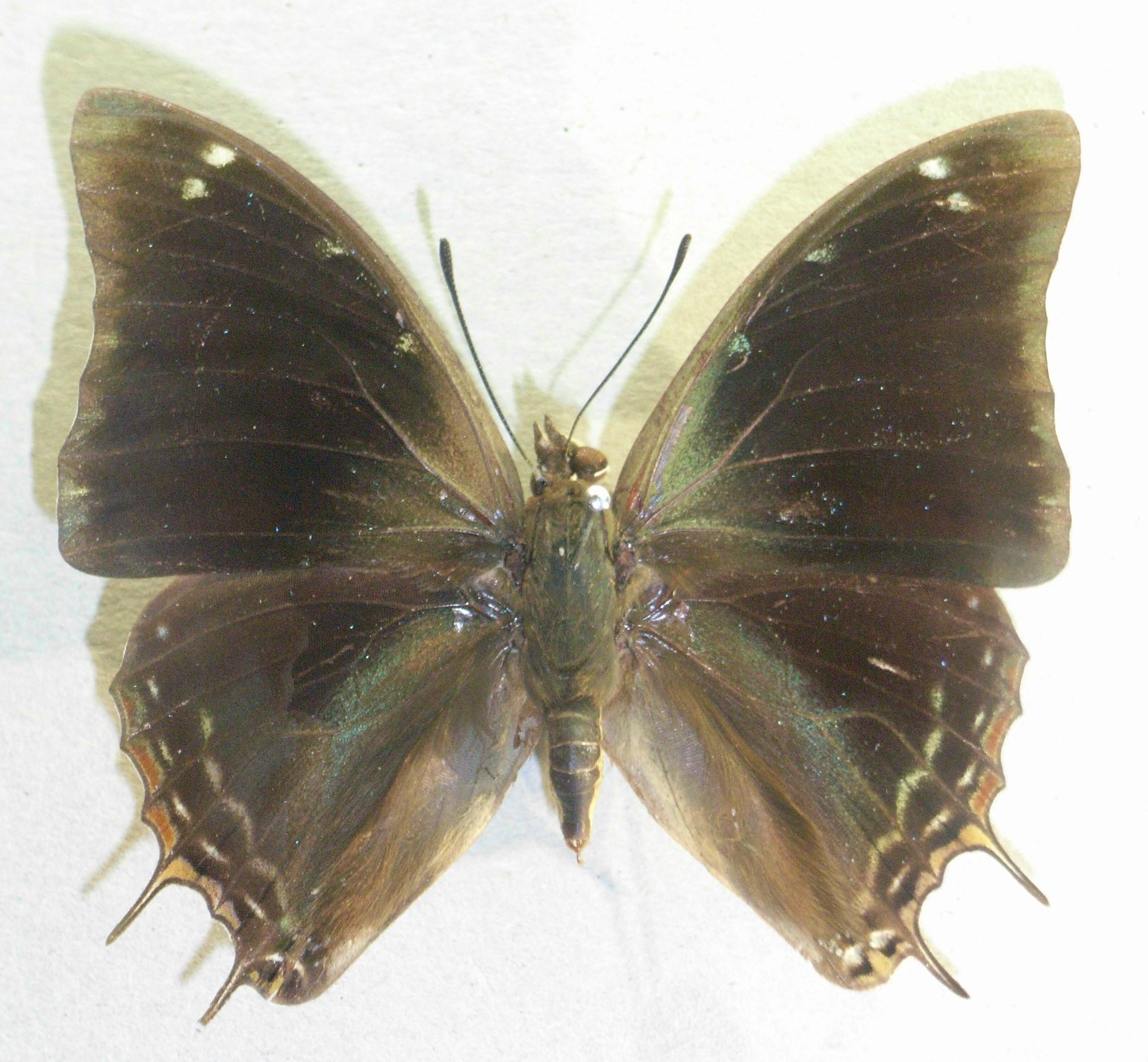
- Male
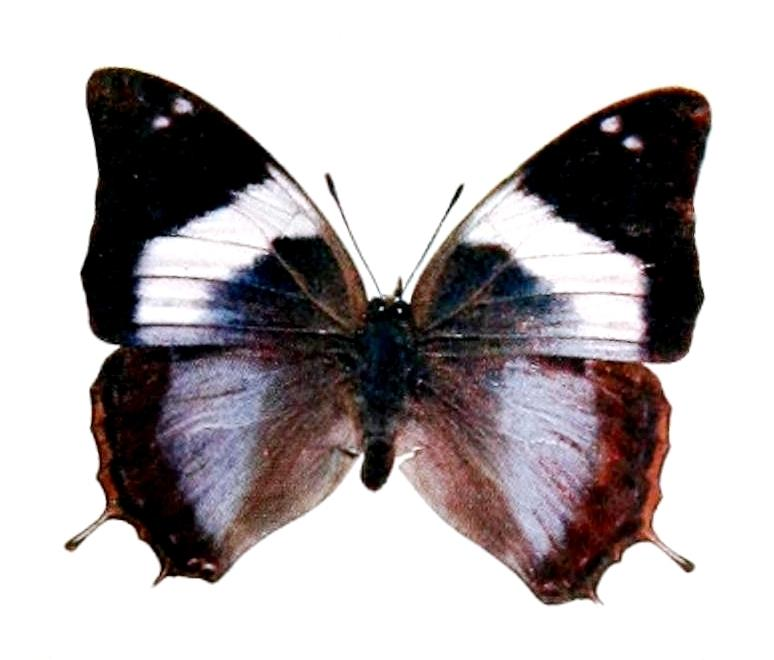
- Female

Scientific classification
- Domain: Eukaryota
- Kingdom: Animalia
- Phylum: Arthropoda
- Class: Insecta
- Order: Lepidoptera
- Family: Nymphalidae
- Genus: Charaxes
- Species: C. manica

Binomial name
- Charaxes manica Trimen, 1894

Synonyms
- Charaxes dewitzi Butler, 1895; Charaxes chittyi Rydon, 1980; Charaxes chittyi f. helgae Rydon, 1980

= Charaxes manica =

Manica charaxes

Species of butterfly

Charaxes manica, the Manica charaxes, is a butterfly in the family Nymphalidae. It is found in Zimbabwe, western Mozambique and Zambia. The habitat consists of Brachystegia woodland.

Adults are on wing year round.

The larvae feed on Albizia antunesiana, Dalbergiella nyasae, Albizia antunesiana, Brachystegia spiciformis, Brachystegia boehmii and Dalbergia lactea.

== Taxonomy ==
Charaxes manica is a member of the large species group Charaxes etheocles. The male is very similar to both Charaxes howarthi and Charaxes chintechi
