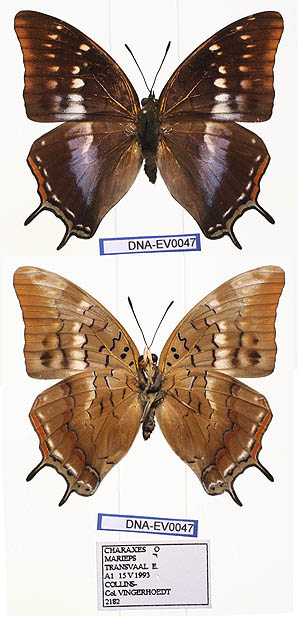

Conservation status
- Least Concern (IUCN 3.1)

Scientific classification
- Kingdom: Animalia
- Phylum: Arthropoda
- Class: Insecta
- Order: Lepidoptera
- Family: Nymphalidae
- Genus: Charaxes
- Species: C. marieps

Binomial name
- Charaxes marieps van Someren & Jackson, 1957

= Charaxes marieps =

Marieps emperor

Species of butterfly

Charaxes marieps, the Marieps emperor, is a butterfly of the family Nymphalidae. It is found in South Africa.

The wingspan is 48–60 mm in males and 65–70 mm in females. Has two broods from September to November and March to May.

Larvae feed on Ochna species. The habitat is montane forest.

Notes on the biology of marieps are given by Pringle et al (1994).

== Taxonomy ==
Charaxes marieps is a member of the large species group Charaxes etheocles
