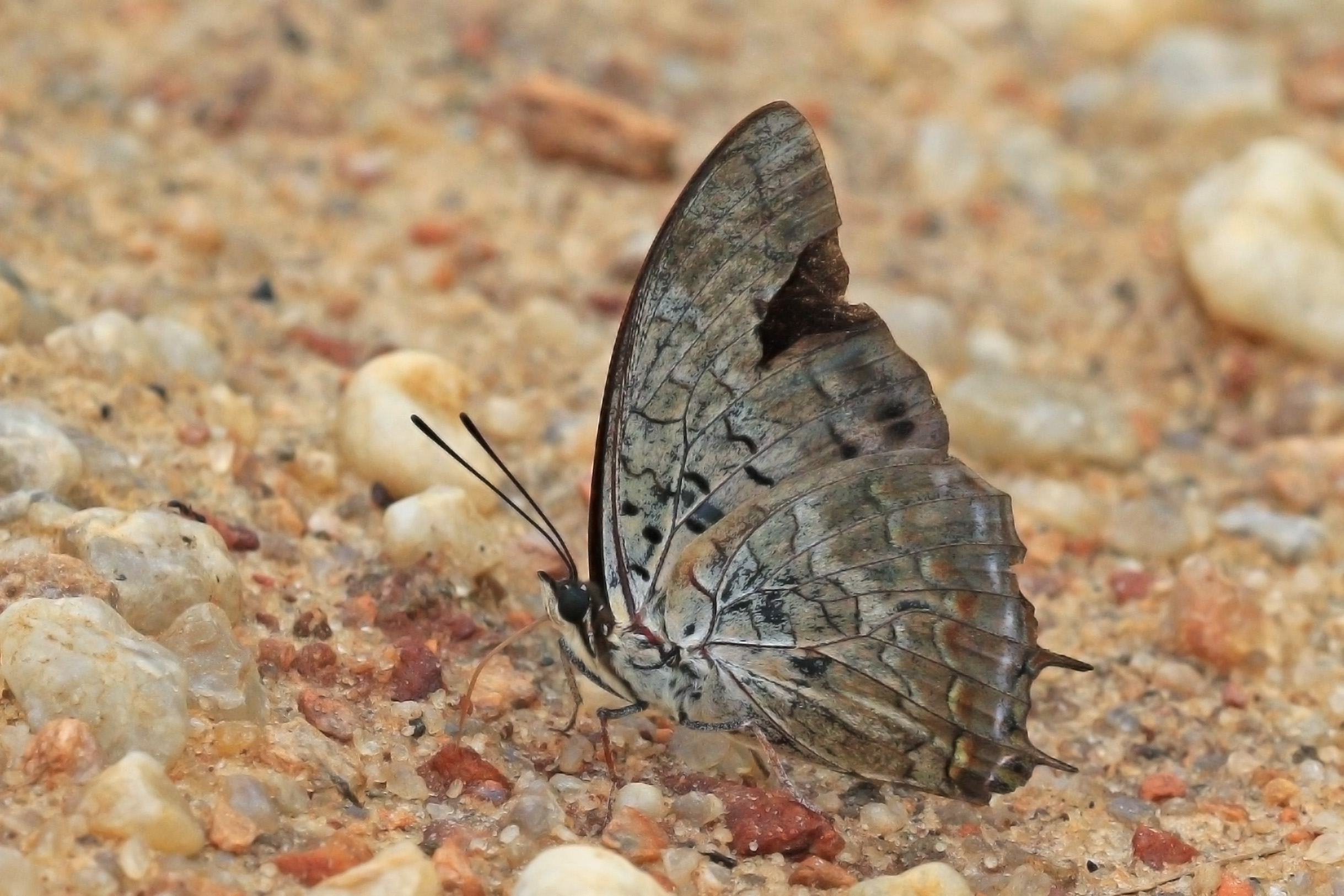
- Male, Queen Elizabeth National Park, Uganda

Conservation status
- Least Concern (IUCN 3.1)

Scientific classification
- Kingdom: Animalia
- Phylum: Arthropoda
- Clade: Pancrustacea
- Class: Insecta
- Order: Lepidoptera
- Family: Nymphalidae
- Genus: Charaxes
- Species: C. etheocles

Binomial name
- Charaxes etheocles (Cramer, 1777)

Synonyms
- Papilio etheocles Cramer, 1777; Charaxes hollandi Butler, 1893; Charaxes etheocles f. carpenteri Poulton, 1919; Charaxes etheocles carpenteri f. pallidimacula van Someren and Jackson, 1957; Charaxes etheocles f. evansi van Someren and Rogers, 1932; Charaxes etheocles evansi f. conjuncta van Someren and Jackson, 1957; Charaxes etheocles etheocles f. violacea Rothschild, 1900; Charaxes etheocles etheocles f. ochracea Rothschild, 1900; Charaxes etheocles etheocles f. regalis Rothschild, 1900; Charaxes etheocles etheocles f. seriata Rothschild, 1900; Charaxes etheocles ochracea f. orangina Faravel, 1998

= Charaxes etheocles =

Demon charaxes

Species of butterfly

Charaxes etheocles, the demon charaxes, is a butterfly in the family Nymphalidae. It is found in Senegal, Guinea, Sierra Leone, Liberia, Ivory Coast, Ghana, Togo, Nigeria, Cameroon, Gabon, the Central African Republic, the Republic of the Congo, Angola, the Democratic Republic of the Congo, Sudan, Ethiopia, Uganda, Kenya, Tanzania and Zambia.

== Biology ==
The habitat consists of tropical and subtropical evergreen forests.

The larvae feed on Scutia myrtina, Griffonia simplicifolia, Albizia gummifera, Celtis gomphophylla, Bandeiraea, Cathormion, Dalbergia and Entada species.

Notes on the biology of etheocles are given by Larsen, T.B. (2005)

== Description ==
Ch. etheocles. Both sexes are very variable and it has not yet been possible to prove-that certain male forms belong to certain female. I must therefore treat the two sexes independently. male : ground-colour of both wings black above. Forewing with the distal margin more or less emarginate; with or without blue markings; the blue markings which may be present are: a spot in the cell; 1—4 discal spots in the basal part of cellules (3, 4) 5 and 6; one or more postdiscal and marginal spots. Hindwing usually with a row of postdiscal lunules and always with white submarginal dots (often ringed with greenish) and distinct marginal streaks. The under surface is similarly marked in all the forms, but is very variable as regards the ground-colour. — f. picta Rothsch. Forewing above with large marginal spots and with 3—8 post-discal spots, sometimes also with discal spots in cellules 3 and 4. Hindwing often with distinct postdiscal spots, but only 1 mm. in breadth; the marginal streaks in cellules 4—6 thick and dotted with red. East Africa from Quilimane to Unyoro. — f. fulgurata Auriv.[Now species] Forewing above with large marginal spots and 3—7 strongly curved submarginal spots, the extremities of which reach the marginal spots; in addition with 2 or 3 discal spots and a spot in the cell. Hindwing with fine postdiscal lunules and thick marginal streaks, in cellules 4—6 dotted with red. Under surface light reddish brown. Angola. — f. chanleri Holl.. Forewing above with large marginal spots, but with only 2 postdiscal spots. Under surface whitish grey to grey. Angola; Transvaal to Somali and Unyoro. — f. contraria Weym. Forewing above with large white marginal spots, 2 postdiscal dots in 6 and 7, discal dots in the same cellules and a spot in the cell. Hindwing above with a fine, undulate blue postdiscal line, white submarginal dots and thick white marginal streaks, more or less bordered with bluish. Undersurface with (silvery) white ground-colour and very conspicuous black markings. German East Africa. — f. cytila Rothsch. Forewing above with small or indistinct marginal spots and two postdiscal spots. Under surface unicolorous red-brown or chocolate-colour. Angola, Nyassaland. — f. catochrous Stgr. Forewing above with very small or indistinct marginal spots and at most with three blue spots at the costal margin (a postdiscal, a discal and one in the cell); marginal streaks of the hindwing not dotted with red. Ground colour of the first two-thirds of the under surface whitish, contrasting sharply with the marginal part. Niger to Congo and Uganda. — f. hollandi Btlr. Marginal spots on the upperside of the forewing small or absent and at most one postdiscal spot; under surface with alternate darker and lighter bands, the ground-colour brown. Common in West Africa from Sierra Leone to the Congo and Uganda. — f. carteri Btlr. only differs from the preceding in the red-violet tone of the under surface, especially on its darker parts. West Africa from Sierra Leone to Congo. — f. ephyra Godt. Forewing with small but distinct marginal spots and one postdiscal spot; marginal spots of the hindwing without red streaks. Under surface coloured either as in hollandi or as in carteriWest Africa. — f. lutacea Rothsch. Forewing above at the base greenish with a large spot in the cell: discal and postdiscal spots single or absent; marginal spots indistinct or absent; the marginal streaks of the hind-wing in cellules 4—6 ochre-yellow or reddish. Under surface dark. Congo and Unyoro. — f. violacea Rothsch. Upper surface with violet-blue ground-colour; forewing with or without marginal spots; marginal streaks of the hindwing dark-centred. Under surface as in hollandi or carteri. Ashanti to Congo. All these forms intergrade more or less and hence cannot be sharply differentiated. — The females are much more variable even than the males and some of them are so dissimilar above that they look like quite different species. The cell of the forewing above has a light spot at the apex or is entirely light. It is noteworthy that many forms are very like other species of Charaxes and exactly mimic these. In order to simplify the analysis of the numerous forms I divide them into three groups: 1. Females in which the forewing above has two almost vertical rows of light spots towards the hindmargin f. kirki Btlr. Hindwing above with broad white median band, with the proximal border bluish and the distal somewhat yellowish, marginal streaks olive, in cellules 4—6 orange. The two rows of spots on the fore-wing are joined together in cellules la—3 and only in cellules 4—7 more or less completely separated; the band formed by them is yellowish white to ochre-yellow. German and British East Africa. — f. ochracea Rothsch. The discal and postdiscal spots of the fore wing ochreous and in cellules la—3 or only in la joined together;the hindwing above with broad pale yellow median band and ochreous marginal streaks (only the streak in la greenish). Under surface red-brown or grey-brown in the basal part, yellow-brown or yellowish in the marginal. Gaboon and Congo. -— f. daria Rothsch. & Jord. The transverse band on the upperside of the wings is in shape similar to that of ethalion female, but is entirely white and in the posterior part of the forewing narrowly, on the hindwing broadly margined with blue. Abyssinia. — f. etheocles Cr. Discal and postdiscal spots of the forewing white or whitish, connected in cellules la—3 or all widely separated; in the latter case the postdiscal spots are all small. Hindwing above with broad white median band, bluish at the edges, and with yellowish or whitish marginal streaks. Sierra Leone to Gaboon. Resembles the female of Ch. ameliae. — f. regalis Rothsch: The spots in la and lb of the forewing united and blue, the rest free, rounded and yellow or whitish. Hindwing above with blue median band and yellow marginal streaks. Recalls the female of Ch. imperialis. Sierra Leone to Old Calabar. — f. dewitzi Btlr. Forewing above in la and lb with large blue spots, about 10 mm. in breadth, in 2—6 with bluish discal spots, in 2—5 entirely without postdiscal spots and only in 6 and 7 with whitish ones. Hindwing above with very broad blue median band (about 12–14 mm.) and greenish, in cellules 4—6 reddish marginal streaks. Angola. — f. seriata Rothsch. Upper surface with red-violet reflection. Forewing in cellules la and lb quite unicolorous or only with yellowish postdiscal spots; cellules 2—7 with small, widely separated, yellow discal and postdiscal spots. Hindwing above without median band, but with orange-yellow marginal streaks and sometimes with indistinct violet postdiscal line. Gaboon. — f. alladinis Btlr. Upper surface with bluish reflection. Otherwise only differs from seriata in having the spots of the hindwing blue, violet or whitish and the marginal streaks on the hindwing grey-blue or greenish. Gold Coast to Cameroons. — f. fulgens Rothsch. only differs from alladinis in having two blue-violet discal spots in cellules 6 and 7 on the upperside of the hindwing. Sierra Leone. — f. virilis Rothsch. Upper surface bluish black. Forewing only with a single blue discal spot in cellule 6 and with an indistinct blue spot in the cell. Hindwing as in seriata. In the absence of the spots on the upper surface this female form strongly resembles a male-It need scarcely be pointed out that the forms here mentioned may intergrade without any sharp demarcation.

2. Females in which the forewing above has a curved white transverse band running from the costal margin towards the anal angle or the hindmargin. f. cedreatis Hew. [Now species] Forewing above at the base to the white transverse band and hindwing to 5 mm. from the distal margin olive-grey; the white transverse band of the forewing in cellules 2—6 5mm. in breadth and sharply defined, in la indistinct; apical part black with 2 whitish postdiscal spots in 6 and 7. Hindwing with whitish submarginal and greenish marginal streaks. Above coloured and marked as in the females of tiridates and numenes. Gold Coast to Angola. — f. rosae Btlr. Hindwing also with a broad whitish or light blue median band above; basal part of both wings brown with metallic reflections. Hindwing beneath with or without white median band. Delagoa Bay to Taveta. — f. lunigera Rothsch. Hindwing above light blue to 5 or 6 mm.from the distal margin; basal part of the fore wing brown; forewing above in cellules 3—7 with strongly curved bluish white submarginal spots. Angola. — f. manica Trim. [Now species] Hindwing as in lunigera; forewing above bright blue tc the transverse band. Angola, Manicaland, Nyassaland. Recalls the female of Ch. bohemani. — f. vetula Rothsch. The white transverse band of the forewing terminates at vein 2; the blue colour of the upper surface less decided, at the base somewhat indistinct; otherwise agreeing with manica. Ogowe River.

3. Females in which the forewing above is bright blue at least to vein 3 and the hindwing to far beyond the middle. Forewing without white transverse band. f. phaeus Hew. Forewing above with postdiscal spots only in cellules 3—7. Delagoa Bay to German East Africa. — f. coryndoni Rothsch. The postdiscal spots of the forewing are all present, those in la and lb joined to the blue basal area; forewing with small blue marginal spots; marginal streaks of the hindwing thick and greenish. Under surface with reddish grey ground-colour and weakly marked. Zambesi. —

A full description is also given by Rothschild, W. and Jordan, K., 1900 Novitates Zoologicae Volume 7:479-481 (for terms see Novitates Zoologicae Volume 5:545-601 )

== Polymorphism ==
Variously coloured females of Charaxes etheocles can be grouped according to the pattern of the upper surface into six main forms, these forms being: (1) similar to the females or males of the many other Charaxes, for instance, Charaxes ameliae and Charaxes imperialis (2) similar to the male etheocles, the white markings of the upperside having almost entirely disappeared (3) similar to the females of Charaxes violetta and Charaxes cithaeron (4) similar to the female of Charaxes bohemani (6) similar to the females of Charaxes tiridates and Charaxes numenes (6) similar to the male of Charaxes bohemani.

== Subspecies ==
- Charaxes etheocles etheocles (Senegal, Guinea, Sierra Leone, Liberia, Ivory Coast, Ghana, Togo, western and eastern Nigeria)
- Charaxes etheocles carpenteri van Someren & Jackson, 1957 (central and eastern Democratic Republic of the Congo, southern Sudan, south-western Ethiopia, Uganda, Kenya, north-western Tanzania, northern Zambia)
- Charaxes etheocles evansi van Someren & Jackson, 1957 (Kenya: highlands west of the Rift Valley) may be a full species
- Charaxes etheocles ochracea van Someren & Jackson, 1957 (Extreme Southwestern Cameroon, Gabon, Congo) perhaps a full species

Torben Larsen developed a species numbering system for his 2005 publication Butterflies of West Africa. The nominate subspecies is #760. The 'Larsen' numbers have since been used with permission in A Sharp Eye on Butterflies of Ghana.

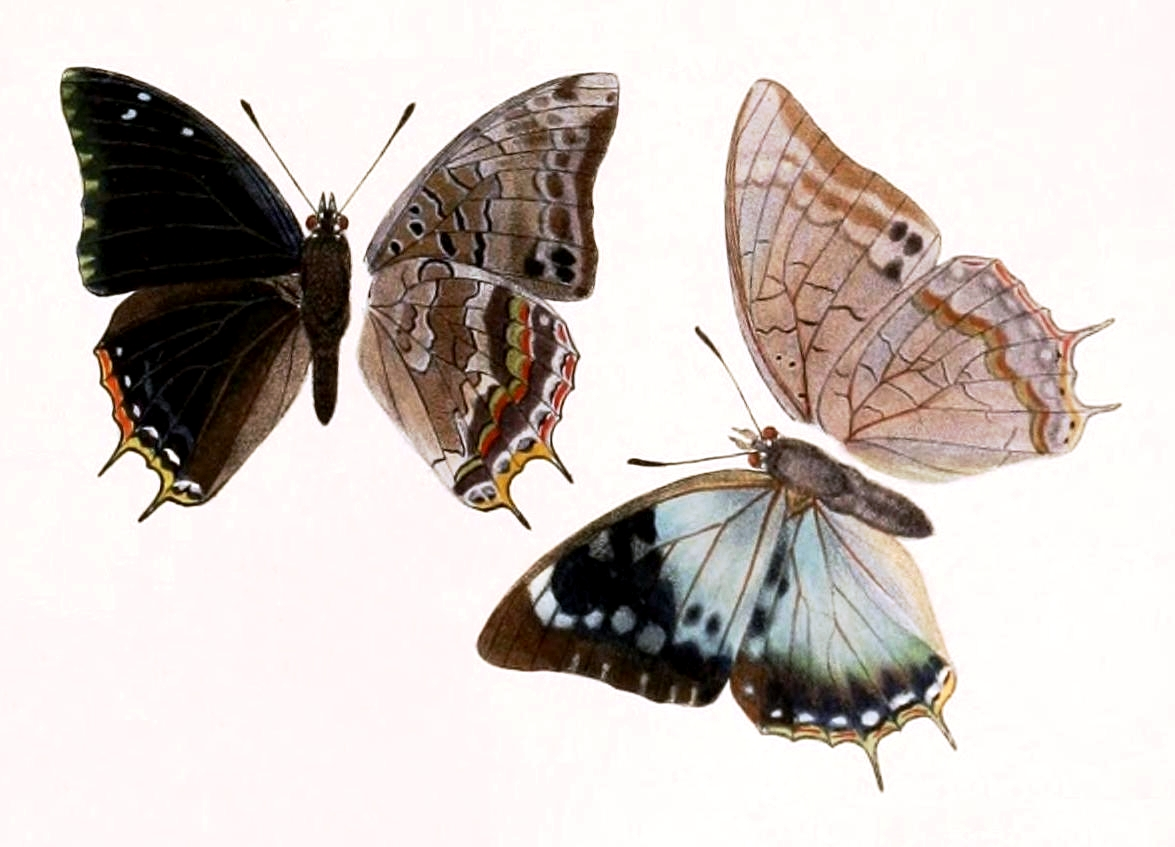
Male and female

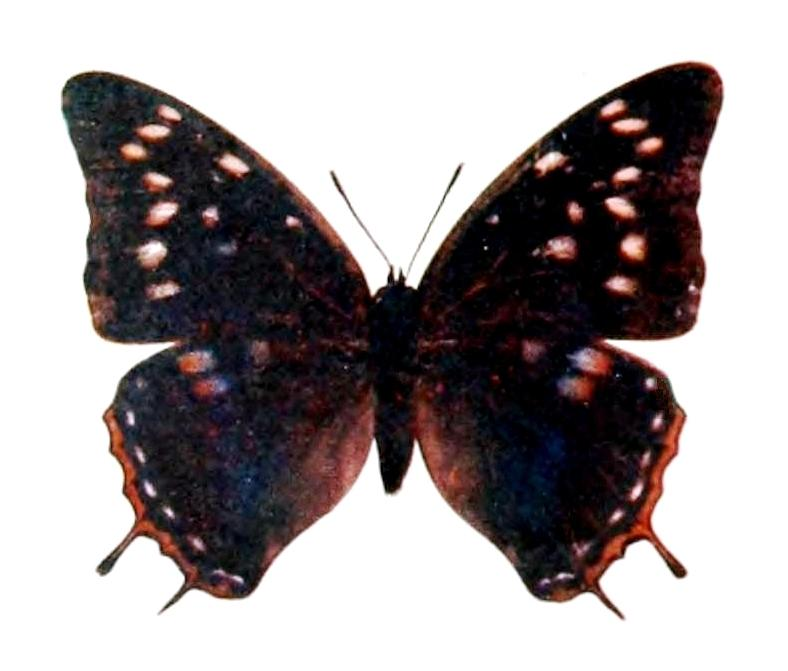
Female C. e. etheocles, f. fulgens

== Taxonomy ==
Charaxes etheocles is a member of the species group Charaxes etheocles. The supposed clade members are:

Clade 1

- Charaxes anticlea
- Charaxes opinatus
- Charaxes baumanni
- Charaxes thysi
- Charaxes hildebrandti
- Charaxes blanda

Clade 2

- Charaxes etheocles nominate very variable
- Charaxes kheili
- Charaxes guderiana
- Charaxes ethalion

Unplaced but in etheocles clade

- Charaxes northcotti
- Charaxes pembanus
- Charaxes usambarae
- Charaxes contrarius
- Charaxes petersi
- Charaxes marieps
- Charaxes karkloof
- Charaxes martini
- Charaxes gallagheri
- Charaxes alpinus
- Charaxes nyikensis
- Charaxes mccleeryi
- Charaxes grahamei
- Charaxes aubyni
- Charaxes chepalunga
- Charaxes virilis
- Charaxes fulgurata
- Charaxes berkeleyi
- Charaxes baileyi
- Charaxes manica
- Charaxes pseudophaeus
- Charaxes chintechi
- Charaxes protomanica
- Charaxes ethalion very variable
- Charaxes pondoensis
- Charaxes viola very variable
- Charaxes phaeus
- Charaxes vansoni
- Charaxes loandae
- Charaxes variata
- Charaxes brainei
- Charaxes cedreatis
- Charaxes mafuga

For a full list of this species group see Vingerhoedt African Charaxes/Charaxes Africains

== Realm ==
Afrotropical realm
