= Charaxes nyikensis =

Scientific classification
- Domain: Eukaryota
- Kingdom: Animalia
- Phylum: Arthropoda
- Class: Insecta
- Order: Lepidoptera
- Family: Nymphalidae
- Genus: Charaxes
- Species: C. nyikensis

Binomial name
- Charaxes nyikensis van Someren, 1975

Synonyms
- Charaxes alpinus nyikensis van Someren, 1975

Species of butterfly

Charaxes nyikensis, the montane charaxes, is a butterfly in the family Nymphalidae. It is found in Malawi and eastern Zambia.

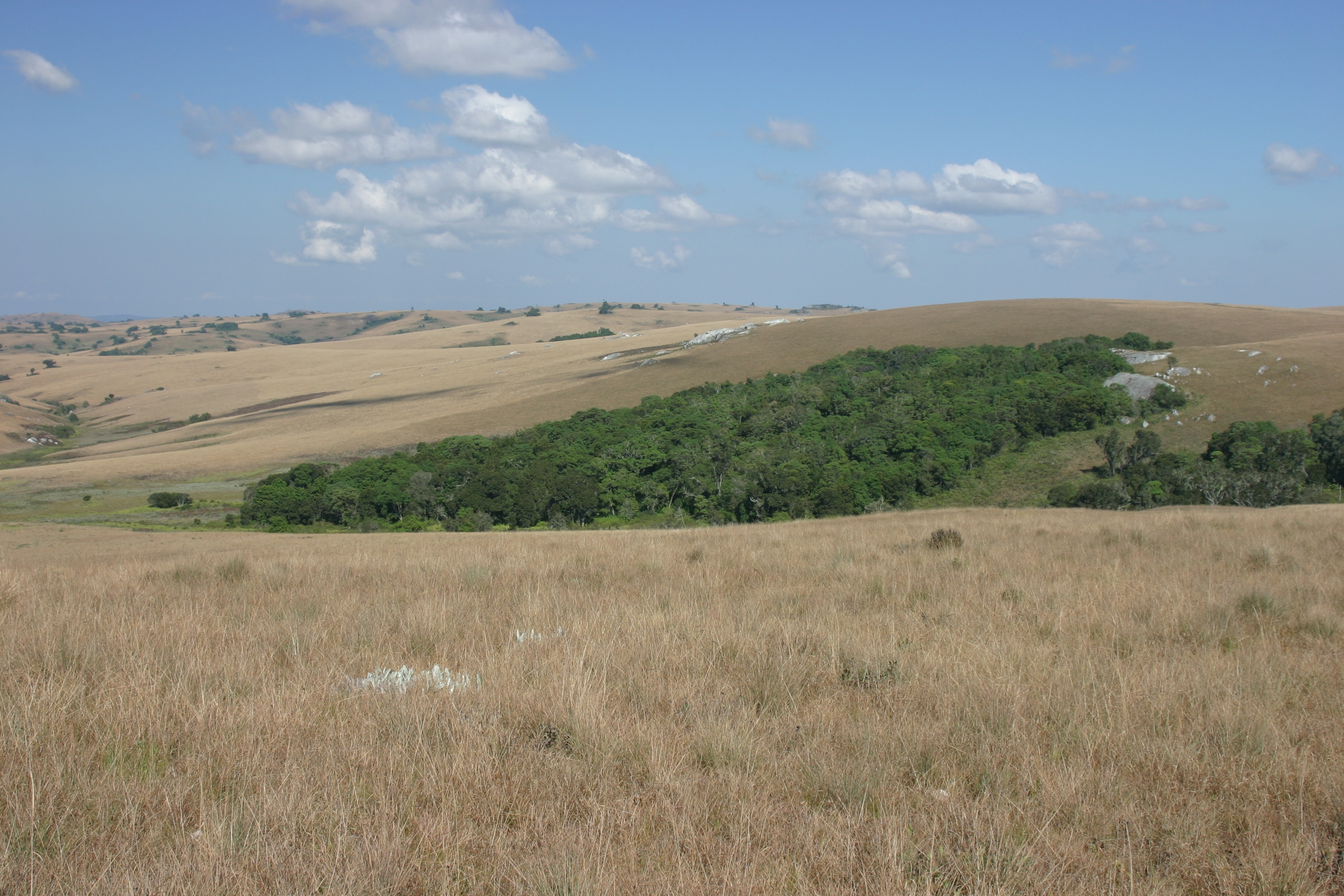
Afromontane forest on the Nyika plateau

The habitat consists of montane forests, riverine forests, scrub forests and Brachystegia woodland (Miombo).

The larvae feed on Albizia gummifera and Dalbergia lactea.

== Taxonomy ==
Charaxes nyikensis is a member of the large species group Charaxes etheocles.
