= Erythrophleum africanum =

- In Zambia

Conservation status
- Least Concern (IUCN 3.1)

Scientific classification
- Kingdom: Plantae
- Clade: Tracheophytes
- Clade: Angiosperms
- Clade: Eudicots
- Clade: Rosids
- Order: Fabales
- Family: Fabaceae
- Subfamily: Caesalpinioideae
- Genus: Erythrophleum
- Species: E. africanum

Binomial name
- Erythrophleum africanum (Welw. ex Benth.) Harms

Species of legume

Erythrophleum africanum, the African blackwood, is a legume species in the genus Erythrophleum found in savannahs of tropical Africa. It produces a gum similar to gum arabic.

The larvae of Charaxes phaeus, the demon emperor, and of Charaxes fulgurata, the lightning charaxes, feed on E. africanum.

This plant is toxic to herbivores. Phytochemical constituents detected in the leaves aqueous extracts are saponins, cardiac glycosides, tannins, flavonoid glycosides, free flavonoids and alkaloids. The plant also yields dihydromyricetin.

== See also ==
- List of Southern African indigenous trees and woody lianes
