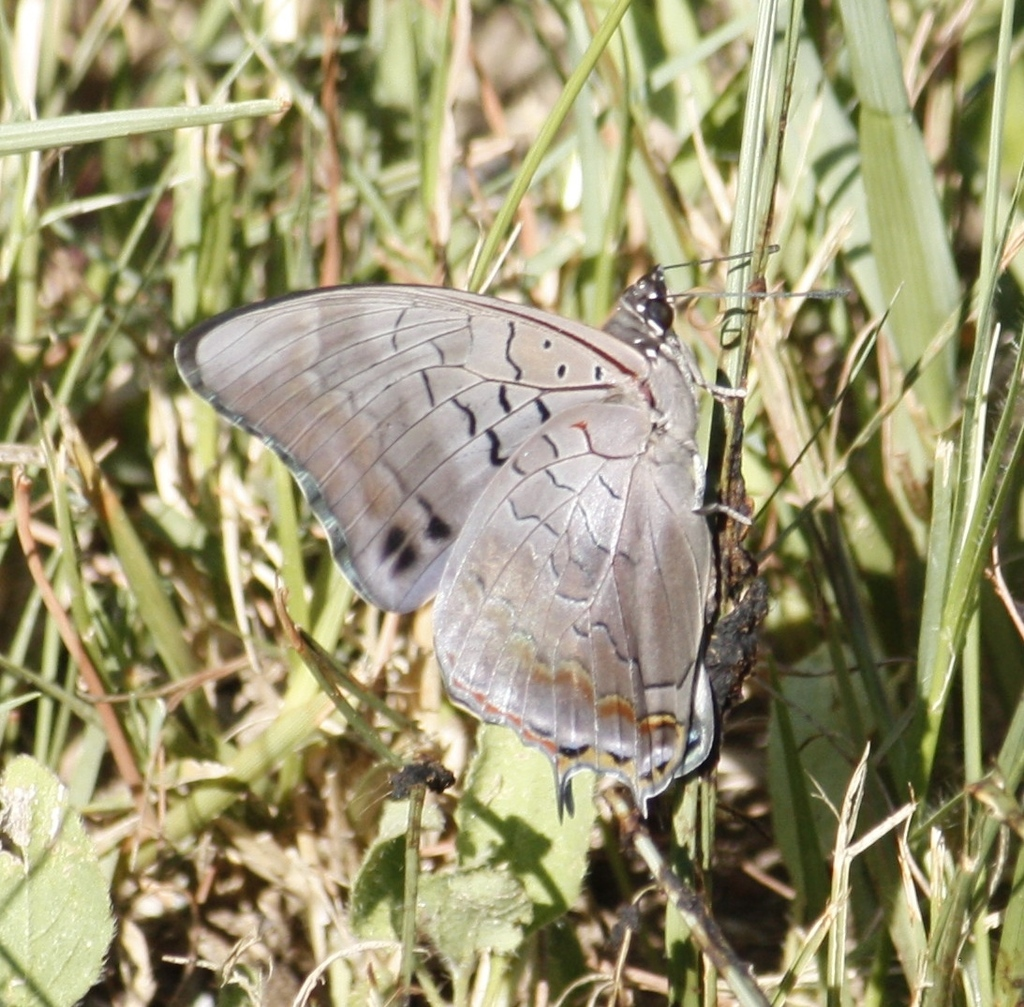

Conservation status
- Least Concern (IUCN 3.1)

Scientific classification
- Kingdom: Animalia
- Phylum: Arthropoda
- Class: Insecta
- Order: Lepidoptera
- Family: Nymphalidae
- Genus: Charaxes
- Species: C. vansoni

Binomial name
- Charaxes vansoni van Someren, 1975

Synonyms
- Charaxes viola phaeus f. vansoni van Someren and Jackson, 1957

= Charaxes vansoni =

Van Son's emperor

Species of butterfly

Charaxes vansoni, the Van Son's emperor, is a butterfly of the family Nymphalidae. It is found in southern Africa.

The wingspan is 48–56 mm in males and 50–60 mm in females.

== Description ==
In males of Charaxes vansoni the two subapical spots on the forewing upperside are blue, whereas in Charaxes phaeus, with which it is often sympatric, they are white and the ground colour of the hindwing underside is pale coppery brown, with the silvery sheen comparatively reduced, extending only from the base along the costa and cell. In females of Charaxes vansoni the median band on the upperside may be white, greenish white or bluish. The spots on the forewing upperside vary from white to orange-ochre.

== Biology ==
It flies year-round, with peaks from February to May and in spring. The habitat is dry savanna.

The larvae feed on Peltophorum africanum.

== Taxonomy ==
Charaxes vansoni is a member of the large species group Charaxes etheocles
