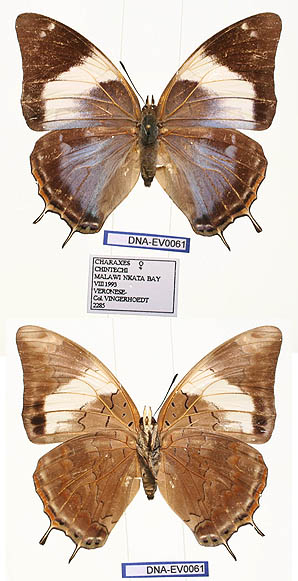

Scientific classification
- Kingdom: Animalia
- Phylum: Arthropoda
- Clade: Pancrustacea
- Class: Insecta
- Order: Lepidoptera
- Family: Nymphalidae
- Genus: Charaxes
- Species: C. chintechi

Binomial name
- Charaxes chintechi van Someren, 1975

Synonyms
- Charaxes etheocles etheocles f. cytila Rothschild, 1900; Charaxes manica f. chintechi van Someren and Jackson, 1952; Charaxes manica f. protomanica van Someren, 1966; Charaxes protomanica van Someren, 1975; Charaxes pseudomanica Minig, 1976; Charaxes chintechi Minig, 1976; Charaxes chintechi f. oriens Rydon, 1990 in Kielland, 1990; Charaxes chintechi f. ochrepicta Rydon, 1990 in Kielland, 1990

= Charaxes chintechi =

Species of butterfly

Charaxes chintechi is a butterfly in the family Nymphalidae. It is found in south-western Tanzania, eastern Zambia, northern Malawi and Mozambique. The habitat consists of Brachystegia woodland (Miombo)

The larvae feed on Brachystegia spiciformis and Dalbergia lactea.

== Taxonomy ==
Charaxes chintechi is a member of the large species group Charaxes etheocles The male is very similar to both Charaxes manica and Charaxes howarthi
