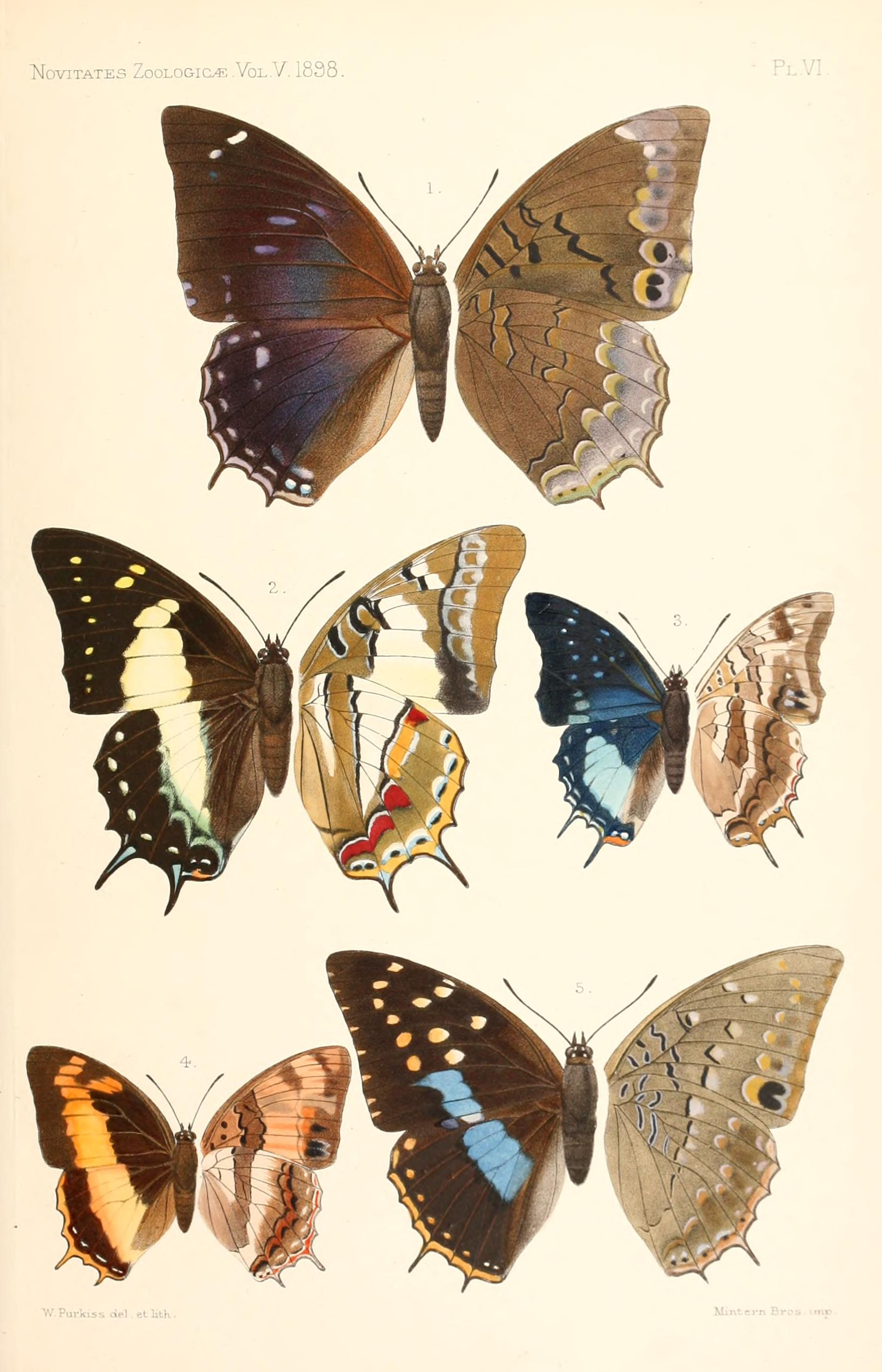
- Figure 4

Scientific classification
- Kingdom: Animalia
- Phylum: Arthropoda
- Clade: Pancrustacea
- Class: Insecta
- Order: Lepidoptera
- Family: Nymphalidae
- Genus: Charaxes
- Species: C. anticlea

Binomial name
- Charaxes anticlea (Drury, 1782)

Synonyms
- Papilio anticlea Drury, 1782; Papilio horatius Fabricius, 1793; Charaxes anticlea f. horatianus Stoneham, 1936; Charaxes anticlea reducta van Someren, 1971

= Charaxes anticlea =

Small flame-bordered charaxes

Species of butterfly

Charaxes anticlea, the small flame-bordered charaxes, is a butterfly in the family Nymphalidae. It is found in Senegal, Guinea-Bissau, Guinea, Sierra Leone, Liberia, Ivory Coast, Ghana, Togo, Nigeria, Cameroon, Gabon, the Republic of the Congo, the Central African Republic, Angola, the Democratic Republic of the Congo, Uganda, Kenya, Tanzania and Zambia.

== Description ==
Ch. anticlea Drury male: wings above deep black; forewing at the hinder angle between the hind margin and vein 3 with a triangular orange submarginal band, which is only 1 mm. from the distal margin; hindwing above with an orange band, anteriorly narrower, in the middle about 8 mm. in breadth, which encloses 4—6 black, white-centred submarginal spots; above strongly recalls the male of protoclea In the female the wings are black-brown above, with a common, nearly straight, light orange median band, which on the hindwing is 9 mm. in breadth and in cellules 5—7 of the forewing is divided into two branches; hindwing with a continuous orange marginal line only about 2 mm. in breadth. Sierra Leone and Ashanti. — adusta Rothsch. only differs in the male in having the orange submarginal band of the forewing 2 mm. from the distal margin and in the female in the orange marginal line of the hindwing being partly broken up into spots. Gameroons to Angola and Uganda. A full description is also given by Walter Rothschild and Karl Jordan, 1900 Novitates Zoologicae Volume 7:287-524. page 492 et seq. (for terms see Novitates Zoologicae Volume 5:545-601 )

== Biology ==
The habitat consists of forests, including dry forests, and dense riverine vegetation.

Both sexes are attracted to rotting fruit and tree sap.

The larvae feed on Acacia poetzi, Acacia pennata, Mezoneuron benthamianum, Acacia goetzei, Acacia brevispica, Mezoneuron welwitschianum and Mezoneuron angolense.

== Subspecies ==
- Charaxes anticlea anticlea (Senegal, Guinea-Bissau, Guinea, Sierra Leone, Liberia, Ivory Coast, Ghana, Togo, Nigeria)
- Charaxes anticlea adusta Rothschild, 1900 (Democratic Republic of the Congo, Uganda, western Tanzania)
- Charaxes anticlea mwera Vingerhoedt & Thiry, 1996(Democratic Republic of the Congo: Shaba)
- Charaxes anticlea proadusta van Someren, 1971 (Nigeria, Cameroon, Gabon, Congo, western Central African Republic, northern Angola, Democratic Republic of the Congo, Zambia
- Charaxes anticlea suna van Someren, 1975(south-western Kenya)

Torben Larsen developed a species numbering system for his 2005 publication Butterflies of West Africa. The nominate subspecies is #758. The 'Larsen' numbers have since been used with permission in A Sharp Eye on Butterflies of Ghana.

== Taxonomy ==
Charaxes anticlea is a member of the large species group Charaxes etheocles

== Realm ==
Afrotropical realm
