= Charaxes mccleeryi =

Scientific classification
- Kingdom: Animalia
- Phylum: Arthropoda
- Class: Insecta
- Order: Lepidoptera
- Family: Nymphalidae
- Genus: Charaxes
- Species: C. mccleeryi

Binomial name
- Charaxes mccleeryi van Someren, 1972

Species of butterfly

Charaxes mccleeryi is a butterfly in the family Nymphalidae. It is found in Tanzania. The habitat consists of lowland to montane forests at altitudes from 600 to 2,150 meters.

The larvae feed on Albizia species.

== Taxonomy ==
Charaxes mccleeryi is a member of the large species group Charaxes etheocles

== Subspecies ==
- Charaxes mccleeryi mccleeryi (north-eastern Tanzania)
- Charaxes mccleeryi iringae Kielland, 1990 (Tanzania: central to the Iringa District)
