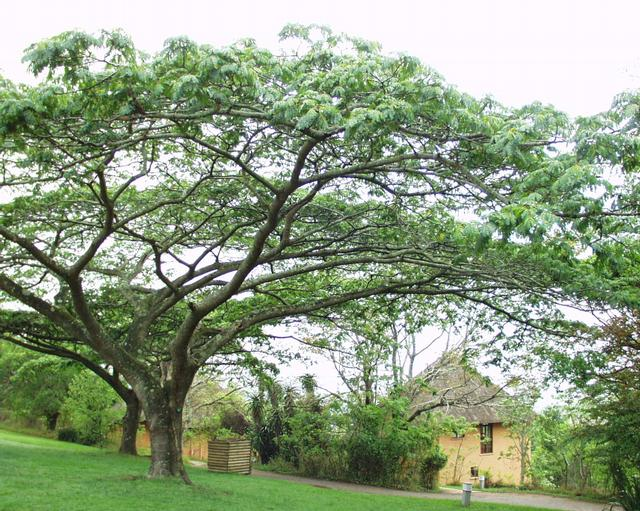

Scientific classification
- Kingdom: Plantae
- Clade: Tracheophytes
- Clade: Angiosperms
- Clade: Eudicots
- Clade: Rosids
- Order: Fabales
- Family: Fabaceae
- Subfamily: Caesalpinioideae
- Clade: Mimosoid clade
- Genus: Albizia
- Species: A. adianthifolia

Binomial name
- Albizia adianthifolia (Schumach.) W.F.Wight

= Albizia adianthifolia =

Species of legume

Albizia adianthifolia is a tree in the family Fabaceae. It is commonly known as the flat-crown. Its range extends from eastern South Africa to Tropical Africa.

== Description ==
This is a large deciduous tree with a spreading, flat crown, growing to a height of 25 metres (82 ft). A profusion of bright green leaves and heavily scented, fluffy flowers are produced in winter or spring. The leaves are twice compound with the leaflets being 2–5 x 8 mm in size. This tree favours sandy soils in warm, high rainfall areas. In South Africa it is found in coastal lowland forests.

== Cultivation ==
Albizia adianthifolia is cultivated as an ornamental tree. The attractive habit of these trees makes them a popular garden tree, often being retained as a native plant in suburban gardens when other indigenous vegetation is removed. The trees usually produce abundant seeds which are easily grown in sandy soil.

== Ecological significance ==
Elephants browse the leaves of these trees and blue duiker favour the leaves and seedpods as food. The larvae of the satyr charaxes butterfly (Charaxes ethalion) feed on the leaves of these trees.

== See also ==
- Southern African Sand Forest

== Gallery ==
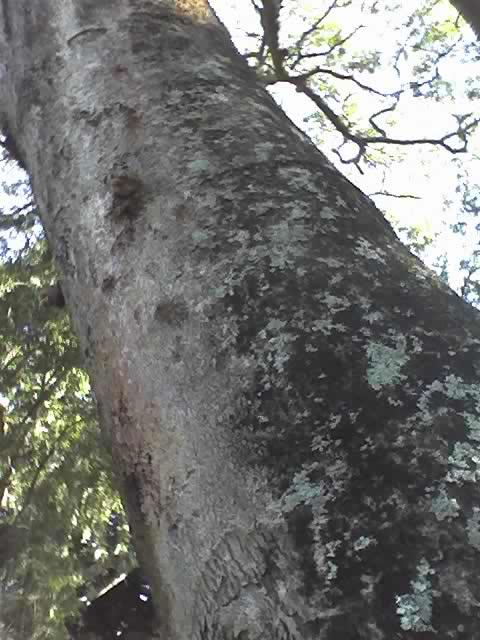
Trunk of Albizia adianthifolia

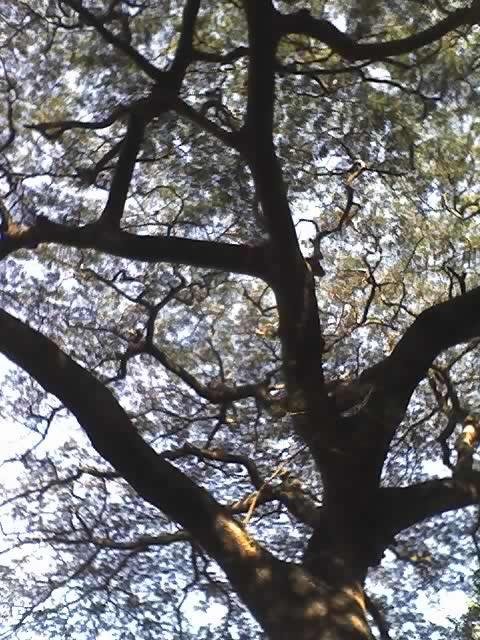
Branches and canopy

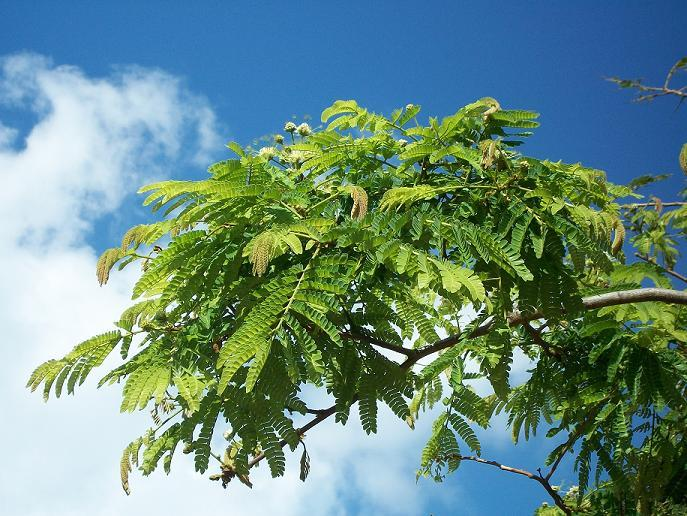
New foliage and flowers

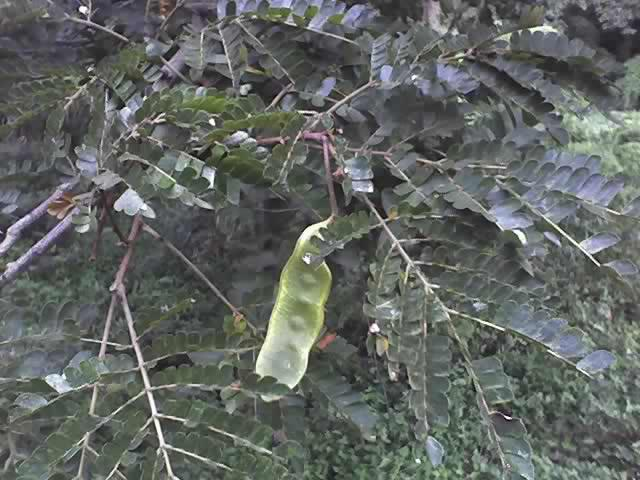
Foliage and a green pod

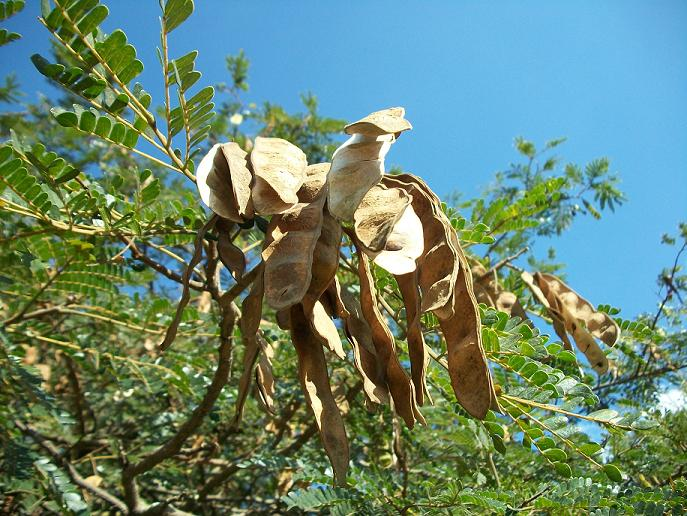
Mature pods and leaves

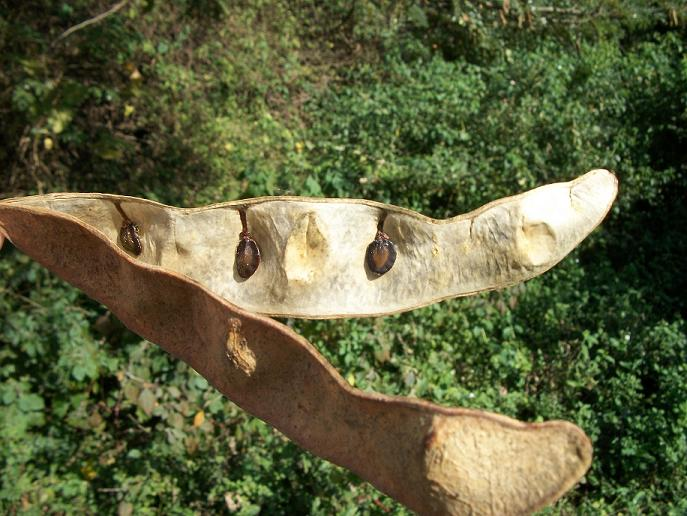
An open pod with seeds
