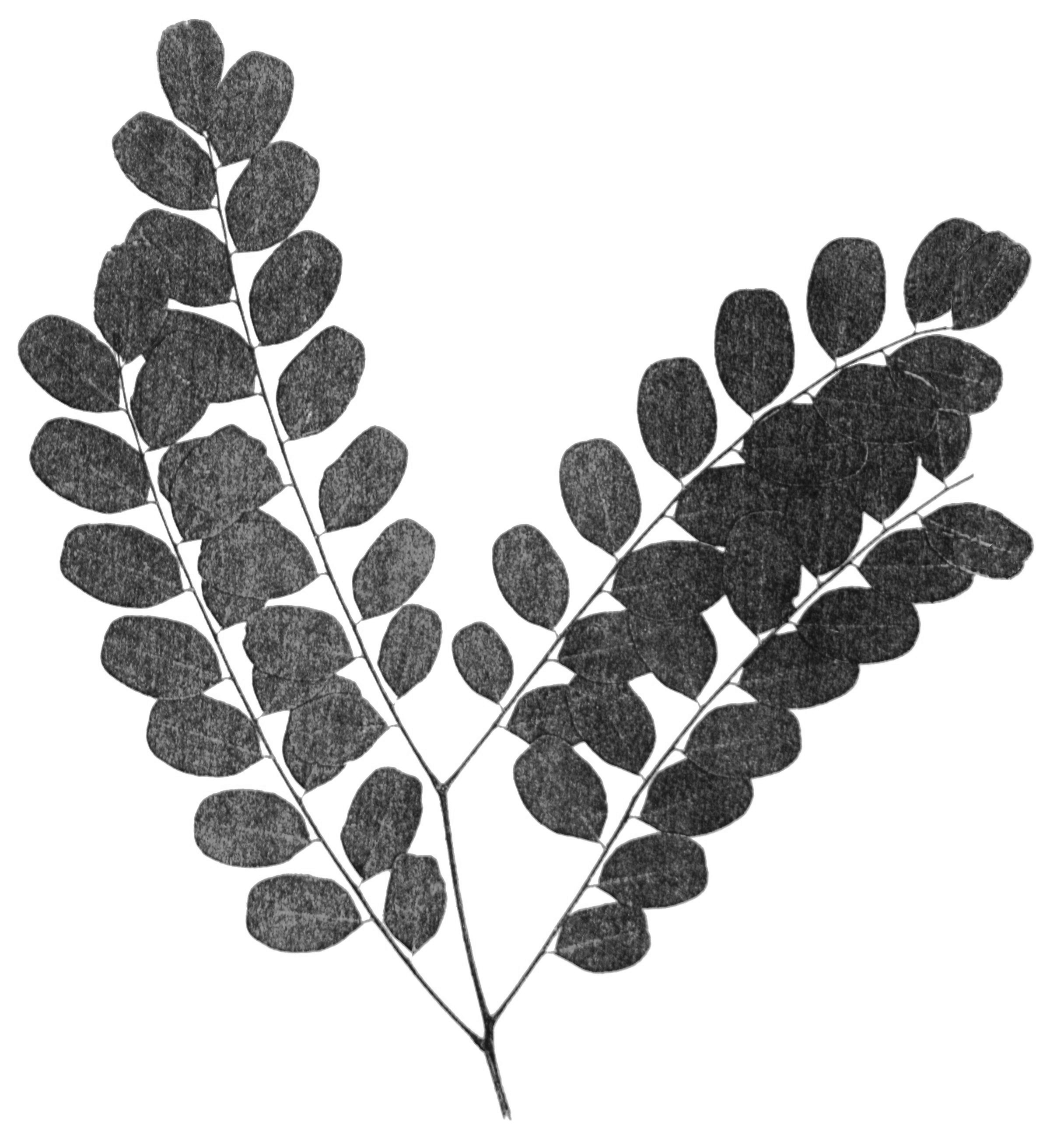
- Twice pinnate compound leaf

Scientific classification
- Kingdom: Plantae
- Clade: Tracheophytes
- Clade: Angiosperms
- Clade: Eudicots
- Clade: Rosids
- Order: Fabales
- Family: Fabaceae
- Subfamily: Caesalpinioideae
- Clade: Mimosoid clade
- Genus: Amblygonocarpus; Harms (1897)
- Species: A. andongensis

Binomial name
- Amblygonocarpus andongensis (Welw. ex Oliv.) Exell & Torre (1955)

Synonyms
- Amblygonocarpus obtusangulus (Welw. ex Oliv.) Harms (1899); Amblygonocarpus schweinfurthii Harms (1899); Tetrapleura andongensis Welw. ex Oliv. (1871); Tetrapleura andongensis var. schweinfurthii (Harms) Aubrév. (1950); Tetrapleura obtusangula Welw. ex Oliv. (1871)

= Amblygonocarpus =

Scotsman's rattle

Genus of legumes

Amblygonocarpus is a monotypic genus of flowering plant in the legume family, Fabaceae. Its single species, Amblygonocarpus andongensis, is a tree native to sub-Saharan Africa. The genus belongs to the mimosoid clade of the subfamily Caesalpinioideae.

== Description ==
The species grows up to 25 m tall but often shorter and it is largely hairless, the bark is grey black to brownish, shedding irregularly scales and leaving reddish scars. Leaves are bipinnately compound, up to 2 - 5 opposite pinnae each having 12 - 18 alternate or sub-opposite leaflets. Leaflets are broadly obovate to elliptic in shape, up to 25 mm long and 15 mm wide. Inflorescence is arranged in axillary racemes, with the creamy yellow to whitish flowers fragrant.

The fruit is a 4-sided pod that is glossy brown and up to 17 cm long.

== Distribution ==
Native to Tropical Africa, in Ghana eastwards to Sudan and Uganda and southwards to Botswana and Tanzania. Can be found in deciduous woodlands and in savannas.

== Uses ==
Its wood is used in carpentry work for furniture making.

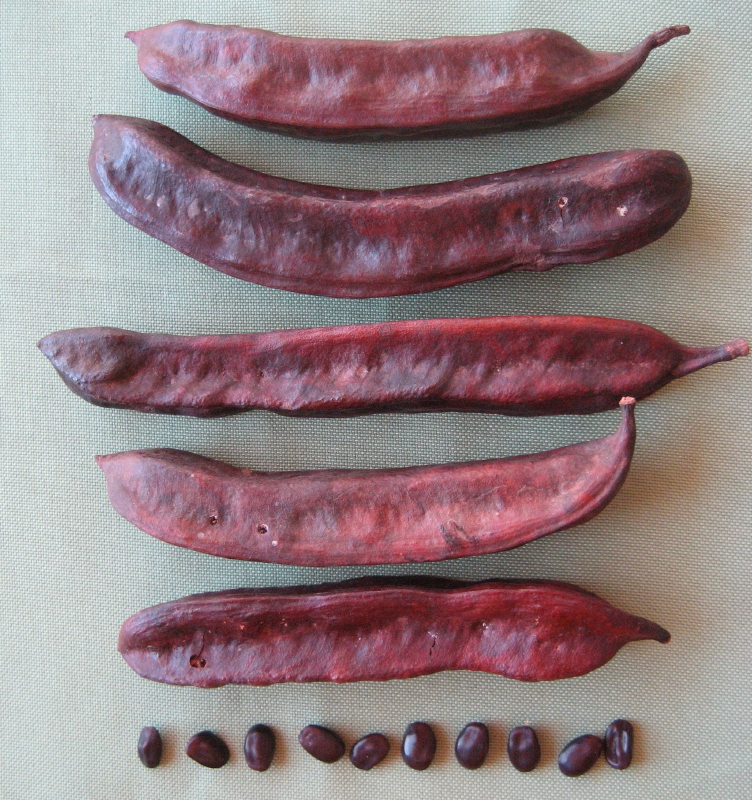
Seedpods and seeds
