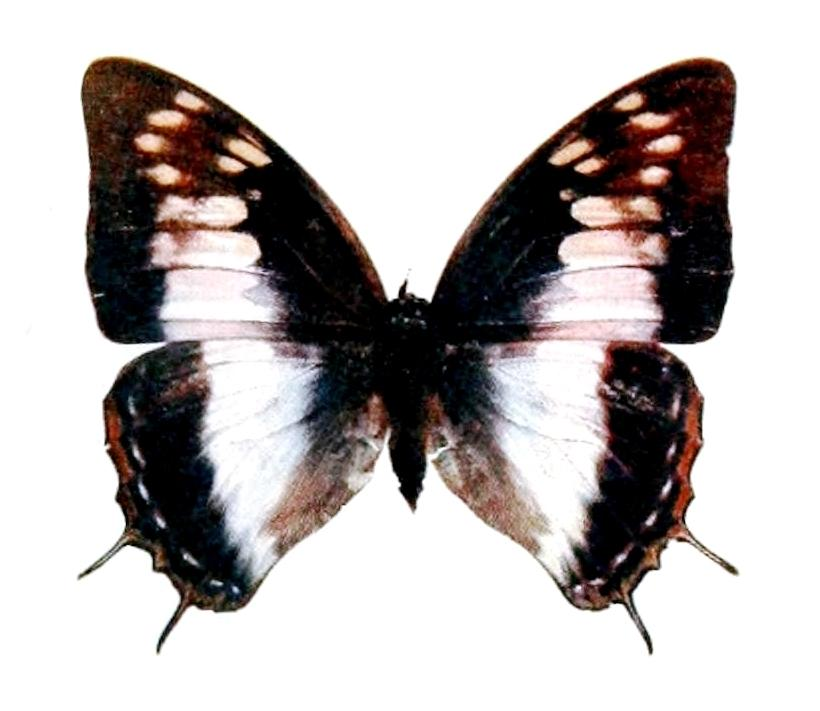

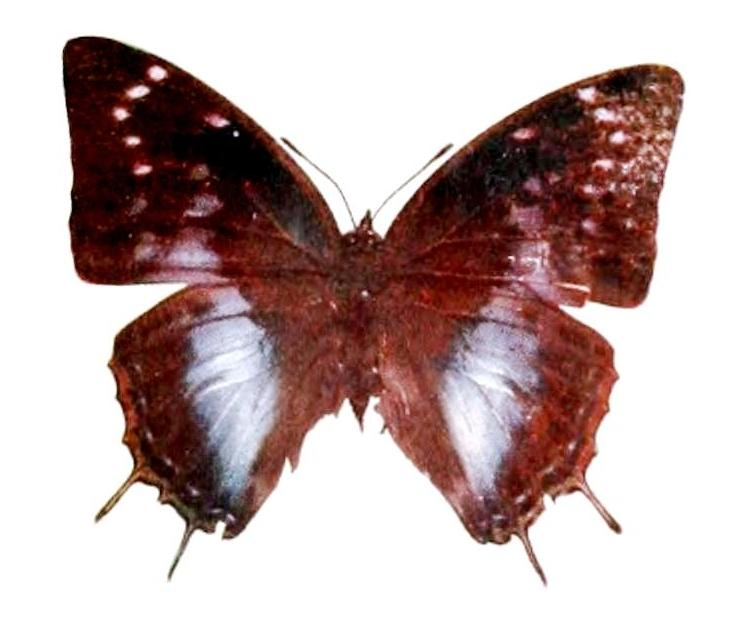
- Two female specimens

Scientific classification
- Kingdom: Animalia
- Phylum: Arthropoda
- Class: Insecta
- Order: Lepidoptera
- Family: Nymphalidae
- Genus: Charaxes
- Species: C. ethalion

Binomial name
- Charaxes ethalion (Boisduval, 1847)

Synonyms
- Nymphalis ethalion Boisduval, 1847; Nymphalis erithalion Doubleday, 1849; Charaxes rosae Butler, 1895; Charaxes ethalion f. swynnertoni Poulton, 1919; Charaxes ethalion ethalion f. aurantimacula van Someren, 1967; Charaxes ethalion nyassana f. cithaeronides van Someren, 1967; Charaxes ethalion nyassana f. suppressa van Someren, 1967; Charaxes ethalion nyassana f. imitans van Someren, 1967; Charaxes ethalion nyasana van Someren, 1967; Charaxes ethalion nyassana f. demaculata van Someren, 1967; Charaxes ethalion nyasicus van Someren, 1975; Charaxes etheocles f. ethalionoides Carpenter, 1945; Charaxes ethalion f. howardi van Someren and Jackson, 1952

= Charaxes ethalion =

Satyr emperor

Species of butterfly

Charaxes ethalion, the satyr emperor or satyr charaxes, is a butterfly of the family Nymphalidae. It is found in southern Africa.

== Description ==
The wingspan is 45–55 mm in males and 50–63 mm in females. Ch. ethalion Bdv. Very nearly allied to c. etheocles and only differing in the male in the genital armature and in the female in having the cell of the forewing above unicolorous, never with light spots. Male: wings above velvety black, almost without metallic gloss. Forewing above without marginal spots and at most with a postdiscal and a discal spot; spot in the cell often absent. Hindwing with small or indistinct whitish submarginal dots and greenish, in cellules 4–6 often red-yellow marginal streaks. The female is similar to that of etheocles f. etheocles, but has no spot in the cell of the forewing. The markings are white, ochre-yellow or bluish. Cape to British East Africa. — Larva unicolorous green with a yellowish-bordered spot on the sixth segment. —ab. kitungulensis Strand has two postdiscal spots in 6 and 7, but no other light spots on the forewing. German East Africa. A full description is also given by Rothschild, W. And Jordan, K., 1900 Novitates Zoologicae Volume 7:478-479 (for terms see Novitates Zoologicae Volume 5:545-601 )

== Biology ==
The habitat is forest and dense moist savanna, including Brachystegia woodland.

Larvae feed on Albizia spp., Newtonia buchananii, Peltophorum africanum, Dichrostachys cinerea, Acacia ataxacantha, and Scutia myrtina.

Notes on the biology of ethalion are given by Pringle et al. (1994), and Kielland, J. (1990).

== Subspecies ==
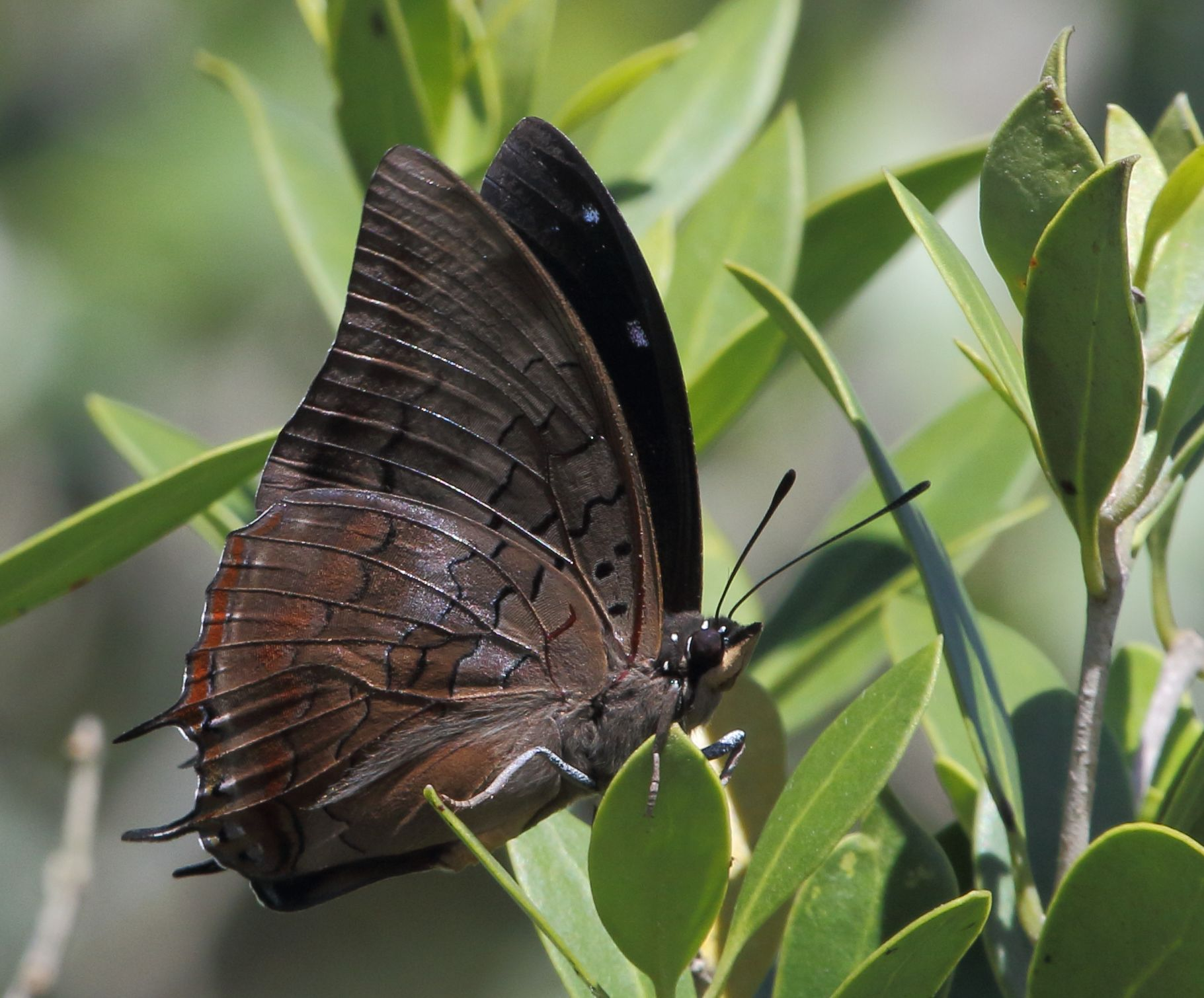
Male C. e. ethalion at Cumberland Nature Reserve, KwaZulu-Natal

Listed alphabetically:

- C. e. binghami Henning, 1982 (Zambia, northern Zimbabwe)
- C. e. ethalion Boisduval, 1847 (Mozambique, eastern Zimbabwe, Eswatini, South Africa: Limpopo Province, Mpumalanga, KwaZulu-Natal)
- C. e. fisheri Henning, 1982 (Zambia: north to the southern part of Lake Tanganyika)
- C. e. handmani Henning, 1982 (Malawi: south to the Mlanje district)
- C. e. kikuyuensis van Someren, 1967 (Kenya: highlands east of the Rift Valley)
- C. e. kitungulensis Strand, 1911. (Tanzania, Malawi, Democratic Republic of the Congo: Lualaba, Shaba, Maniema)
- C. e. littoralis van Someren, 1967 (eastern Kenya, eastern Tanzania)
- C. e. marsabitensis van Someren, 1967 (Kenya: north to Mount Marsabit)
- C. e. nyanzae van Someren, 1967 (Uganda, south-western Kenya, western Tanzania, Democratic Republic of the Congo: east to Lake Mweru)

== Similar species ==
Charaxes pondoensis and Charaxes karkloof

== Taxonomy ==
Charaxes ethalion is a member of the large species group Charaxes etheocles.

== Realm ==
Afrotropical realm
