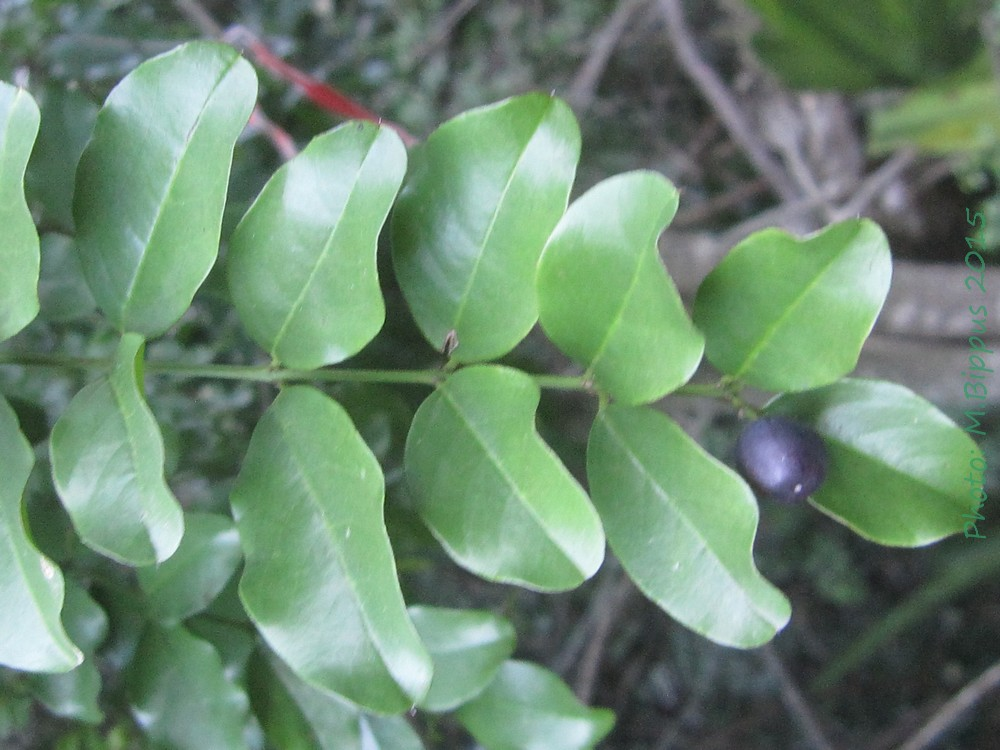

Conservation status
- Least Concern (IUCN 3.1)

Scientific classification
- Kingdom: Plantae
- Clade: Tracheophytes
- Clade: Angiosperms
- Clade: Eudicots
- Clade: Rosids
- Order: Rosales
- Family: Rhamnaceae
- Genus: Scutia
- Species: S. myrtina

Binomial name
- Scutia myrtina (Burm.f.) Kurz

Synonyms
- Synonymy: Adolia myrtina (Burm.f.) Kuntze; Catha zeylanica (Roth) G.Don; Celastrus zeylanicus Roth; Adolia alba Lam.; Adolia capensis Kuntze; Adolia obcordata (Biv. ex Tul.) Kuntze; Adolia rubra Lam.; Blepetalon aculeatum Raf., nom. illeg. superfl.; Ceanothus capensis DC.; Ceanothus circumscissus (L.f.) Gaertn.; Ceanothus circumscissus var. pauciflorus DC.; Ceanothus zeylanicus (Roth) B.Heyne ex Roth; Rhamnus capensis Thunb.; Rhamnus circumcissa L.f.; Rhamnus indica Grubov; Rhamnus lucida Roxb., nom. illeg. homonym. post.; Rhamnus myrtina Burm.f.; Scutia buxifolia Hutch. & M.B.Moss, nom. illeg. homonym. post.; Scutia capensis (Thunb.) G.Don; Scutia capensis f. obcordata (B.Boivin ex Tul.) Radlk.; Scutia capensis var. parvifolia Eckl. & Zeyh.; Scutia circumscissa (L.f.) W.Theob.; Scutia commersonii Brongn.; Scutia eberhardtii Tardieu; Scutia hutchinsonii Suess.; Scutia indica Brongn., nom. illeg. superfl.; Scutia indica var. grandispina Engl.; Scutia indica var. oblongifolia Engl.; Scutia lucida G.Don; Scutia myrtina var. emarginata Bhandari & Bhansali; Scutia myrtina var. oblongifolia (Engl.) C.M.Evrard; Scutia natalensis Hochst.; Scutia obcordata B.Boivin ex Tul.; Scutia rheediana Wight; Ziziphus capensis Thunb. ex Poir.; Ziziphus circumscissa (L.f.) Chaz.

= Scutia myrtina =

Species of flowering plant

Scutia myrtina is a species of plant in the family Rhamnaceae. It is commonly known as cat-thorn.

== Description ==
Scutia myrtina is a variable plant that may grow as a shrub or tree of 2-10 m tall with a trunk diameter of 30 cm or often a scandent liane, climbing by means of thorns. Older bark is dark, corky and longitudinally fissured. Younger growth is hairy and branchlets are green and angular. The thorns are sharp, recurved and paired at the nodes, but sometimes absent. The common name, cat-thorn, refers to the thorns that look like a cat's claw.

Leaves are ovate to obovate, often notched at the apex, but always with mucronulate tip, opposite with usually entire margin, sometimes wavy.

The fruit is a berry with black skin and white flesh containing two to three seeds.

== Distribution ==
The plant is found in Asia and Africa.

== Conservation ==
Scutia myrtina has been assessed as least concern by the IUCN Red List and the Red List of South African Plants.

== Uses ==
Several species in the genus Scutia have been used in traditional medicine, such as the Ayurvedic system from India.
