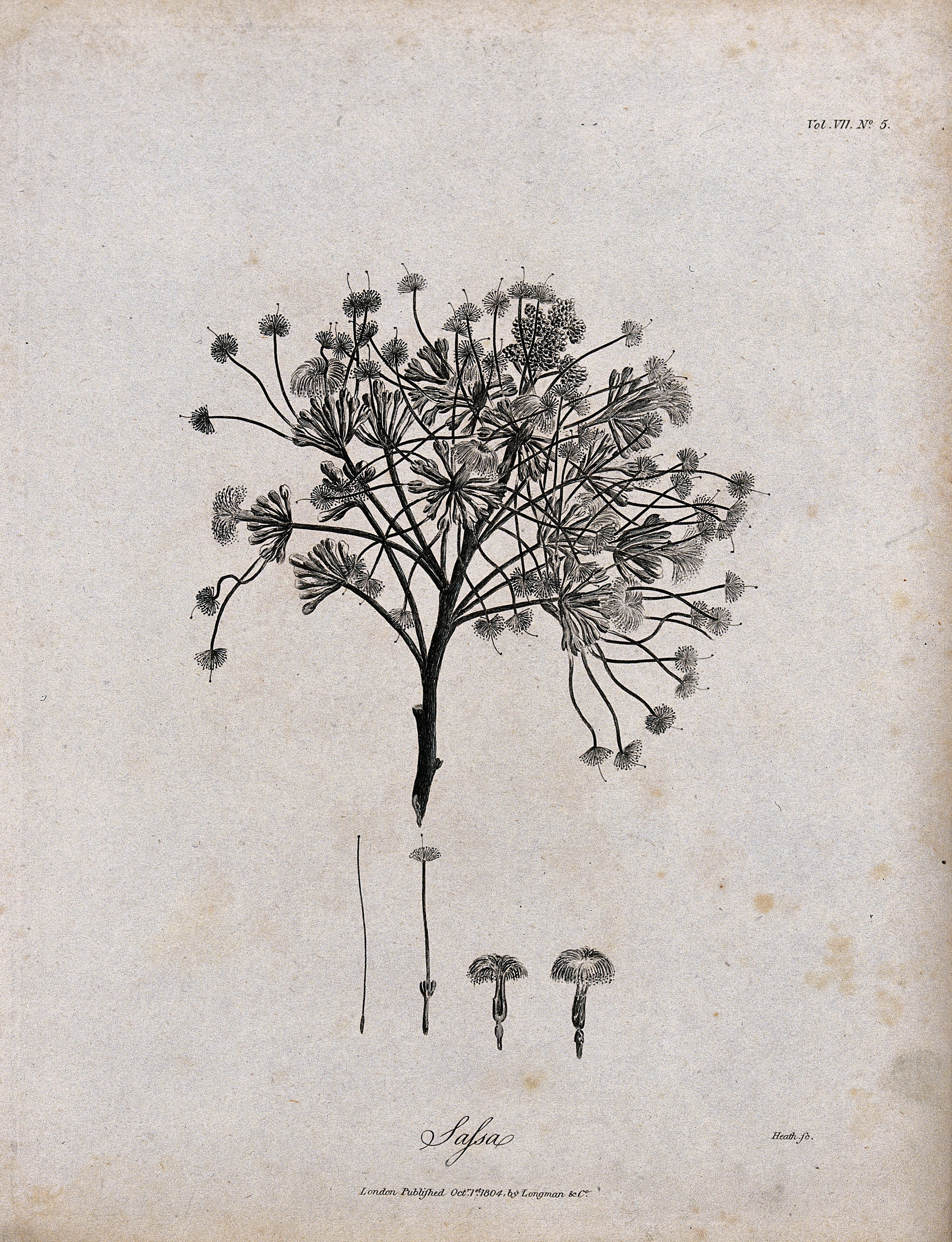
- Engraving by Charles Heath

Scientific classification
- Kingdom: Plantae
- Clade: Tracheophytes
- Clade: Angiosperms
- Clade: Eudicots
- Clade: Rosids
- Order: Fabales
- Family: Fabaceae
- Subfamily: Caesalpinioideae
- Clade: Mimosoid clade
- Genus: Albizia
- Species: A. gummifera

Binomial name
- Albizia gummifera (J.F.Gmel.) C.A.Sm.

Synonyms
- Albizia ealaensis De Wild.; Albizia fastigiata (E. Mey.) Oliv.; Albizia laevicorticata Zimm.; Albizia sassa (Willd.) "Chiov., p.p."; Albizia sassa (Willd.) Chiov.; Albizia sassa (Willd.) J.F. Macbr.; Feuilleea sassa (Willd.) Kuntze; Inga sassa Willd.; Mimosa sassa (Baillon ex Drake) Poir.; Sassa gummifera J.F.Gmel.

= Albizia gummifera =

Species of legume

Albizia gummifera is a species of legume in the family Fabaceae, native to sub-saharan Africa and Madagascar, and naturalized in Brazil. It is also known as peacock flower.

It is recognisable as a very large deciduous, flat-topped tree reaching 24-27 metres in height and an attractive shape with thick branches. The largest specimens grow in wet or seasonally wet forest and closed woodland but it also thrives in some woodland areas with a notable dry season where it can be found at altitudes over 1500 metres. It grows best at moderate altitudes of around 700 - 1200 metres above sea level, but reaches down to below this at the southernmost extent of its range, in the Runde valley in Zimbabwe. It usually has a smooth bark, very rarely rough.
