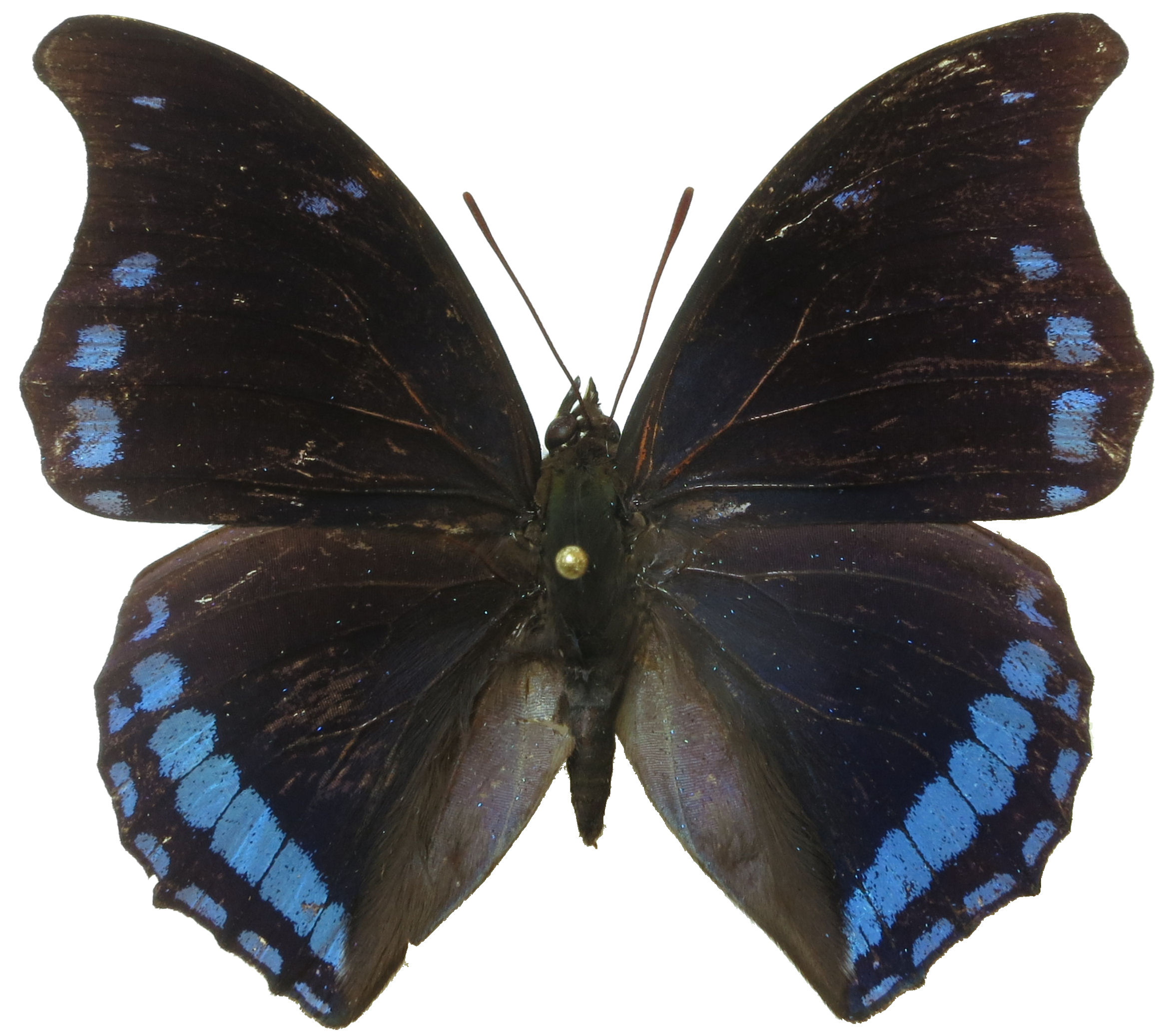
- From the CAR

Scientific classification
- Kingdom: Animalia
- Phylum: Arthropoda
- Clade: Pancrustacea
- Class: Insecta
- Order: Lepidoptera
- Family: Nymphalidae
- Genus: Charaxes
- Species: C. lycurgus

Binomial name
- Charaxes lycurgus (Fabricius, 1793).

Synonyms
- Papilio lycurgus Fabricius, 1793; Papilio laodice Drury, 1782; Nymphalis nesiope Hewitson, 1854

= Charaxes lycurgus =

Species of butterfly

Charaxes lycurgus, the Laodice untailed charaxes, is a butterfly in the family Nymphalidae. It is found in Guinea, Sierra Leone, Liberia, Ivory Coast, Ghana, Togo, Nigeria, Cameroon, Equatorial Guinea, Gabon, the Republic of the Congo, the Central African Republic, Angola, the Democratic Republic of the Congo, Sudan, Uganda and Tanzania. The habitat consists of lowland evergreen forests and riverine forests.

The larvae feed on Pterocarpus santalinoides, Paullinia pinnata, Albizia zygia, Lonchocarpus cyanescens, Dalbergia, Millettia, Dichapetalum and Trachyphrynium species.

== Subspecies ==
- Charaxes lycurgus lycurgus (Guinea, Sierra Leone, Liberia, Ivory Coast, Ghana, Togo, western Nigeria)
- Charaxes lycurgus bernardiana Plantrou, 1978(northern and eastern Nigeria, Cameroon, Gabon, Bioko, Congo, Central African Republic, northern Angola, Democratic Republic of the Congo, southern Sudan, western Uganda, Tanzania: eastern shores of Lake Tanganyika)

Torben Larsen developed a species numbering system for his 2005 publication Butterflies of West Africa. The nominate subspecies is #777. The 'Larsen' numbers have since been used with permission in A Sharp Eye on Butterflies of Ghana.

== Taxonomy ==
Differs from Charaxes zelica in the deeply concave margin of the forewing, the hindwing blue spots are closer to the margin and the presence of submarginal blue spots on the forewing

Charaxes lycurgus is a member of the species group Charaxes lycurgus. The supposed clade members are:

Clade 1

- Charaxes lycurgus nominate
- Charaxes porthos
- Charaxes zelica

Clade 2

- Charaxes mycerina
- Charaxes doubledayi
