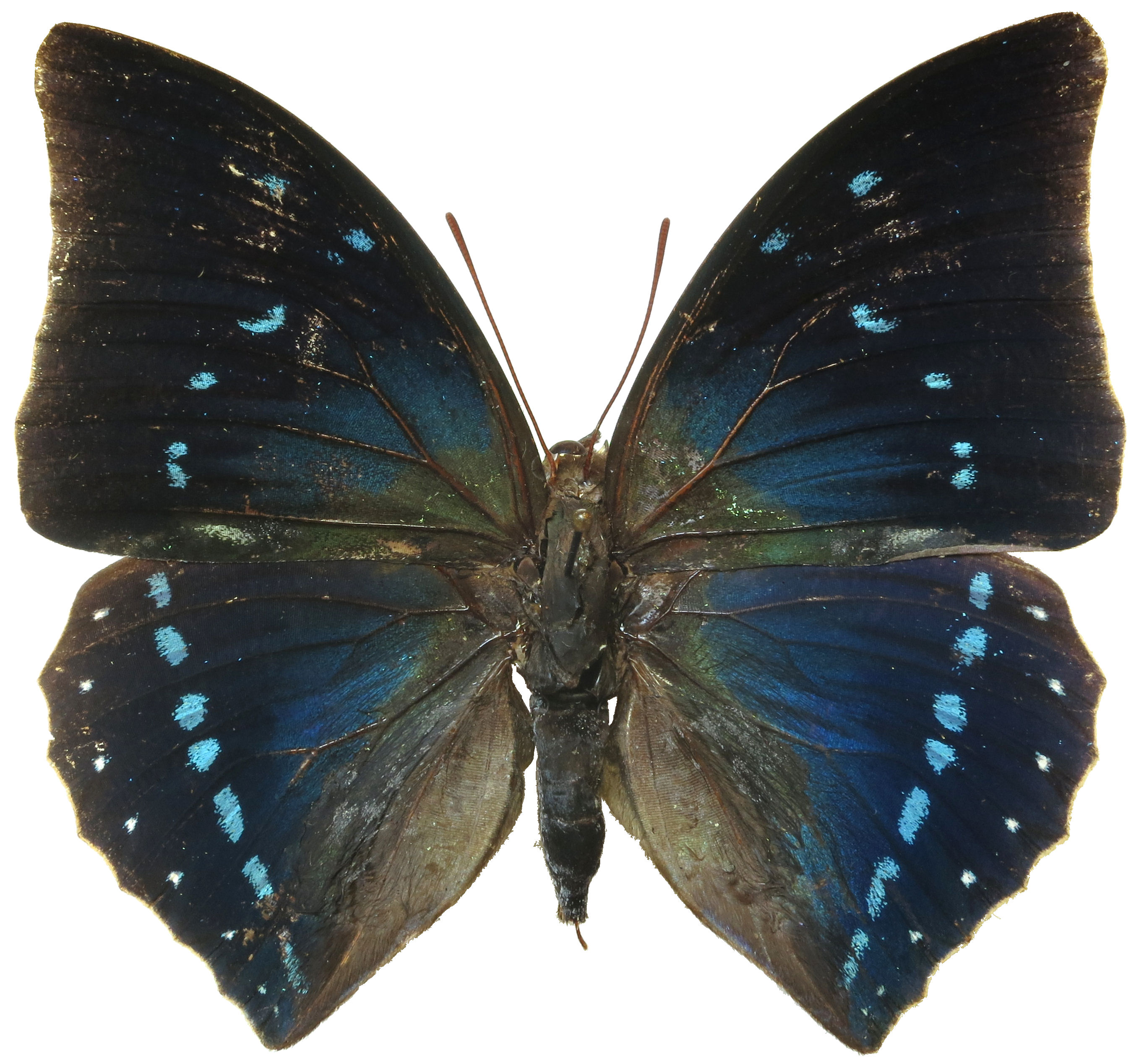
- Male from the CAR

Scientific classification
- Kingdom: Animalia
- Phylum: Arthropoda
- Clade: Pancrustacea
- Class: Insecta
- Order: Lepidoptera
- Family: Nymphalidae
- Genus: Charaxes
- Species: C. zelica

Binomial name
- Charaxes zelica Butler, 1869

= Charaxes zelica =

Species of butterfly

Charaxes zelica, the zelica untailed charaxes, is a butterfly in the family Nymphalidae. It is found in Guinea, Ivory Coast, Ghana, Nigeria, Cameroon, Gabon, the Republic of the Congo, the Central African Republic, the Democratic Republic of the Congo, Angola, Sudan, Uganda, Kenya, Tanzania and possibly Sierra Leone. The habitat consists of forests with altitudes of 800–1,000 metres (2,600–3,300 ft).

Adult males feed on otter and bird droppings and both sexes are attracted to fermented fruit.

The larvae feed on Pterocarpus santalinoides, Paullinia pinnata, Albizia zygia, Lonchocarpus cyanescens, Dalbergia, Millettia, Dichapetalum and Trachyphrynium species.

== Description ==
Original description:

Male Wings above blue-black with the fringe orange, the basal area shot with dark blue-green. Front-wings traversed beyond the middle by a series of six small spots the third to fifth lunular, the others sub-ovate; a sub-costal of the same colour between them and the apex. Hind-wings with an oblique discal series of seven blue spots occurring from the apex to the anal angle; eight sub-marginal white spots delicately encircled by blue scales and seven linear marginal spots. Abdominal margin and body brown, coarsely clothed with hair.

Wings below silky olivaceous, the apical area inclining to ochraceous a sharply defined by a curved line running from the anal angle of hind to the apex of the front-wings; the basal area crossed by two angular silvery bands, terminating in the front-wings in two ochraceous spots; the interior band limited outwardly, and the exterior one inwardly, a black and white line.missing text Front-wings with a pale undulated line upon apical area, two black ocellate spots with white irides near the base, and a black stria at the missing text of the cell. Hind-wings with a large sub-anal silver patch and eight white sub-marginal spots, the three nearest the anal angle pupillated with black; muddy brown, the centre of the thorax, palpi, tibie, and tarsi ochraceous.

Expanse of wings 3 and 1/4 inches. Inhabits West Africa (Ashanti ?).

This beautiful species, which I hope shortly to be able to figure, is allied to Tiridates and Mycerina, the colouration of the upper surface being somewhat similar to the former, the shape of the wings and underside colouring more nearly approaching the latter species.

British Museum 5 May 1869.

Descriptions are also provided van Someren.

Differs from the related Charaxes lycurgus in the straighter hindwing distal border

== Subspecies ==
- C. z. zelica (Guinea, Sierra Leone, Ivory Coast, Ghana, western Nigeria)
- C. z. depuncta Joicey & Talbot, 1921(southern Sudan, Uganda, western Kenya)
- C. z. rougeoti Plantrou, 1978(eastern Nigeria, Cameroon, Gabon, Congo, Central African Republic, Democratic Republic of the Congo, northern Angola)
- C. z. toyoshimai Carcasson, 1964 (north-western Tanzania)

Torben Larsen developed a species numbering system for his 2005 publication Butterflies of West Africa. The nominate subspecies is #776. The 'Larsen' numbers have since been used with permission in A Sharp Eye on Butterflies of Ghana.

== Taxonomy ==
Charaxes zelica is a member of the species group Charaxes lycurgus. The supposed clade members are:

Clade 1

- Charaxes lycurgus - nominate
- Charaxes porthos
- Charaxes zelica

Clade 2

- Charaxes mycerina
- Charaxes doubledayi
