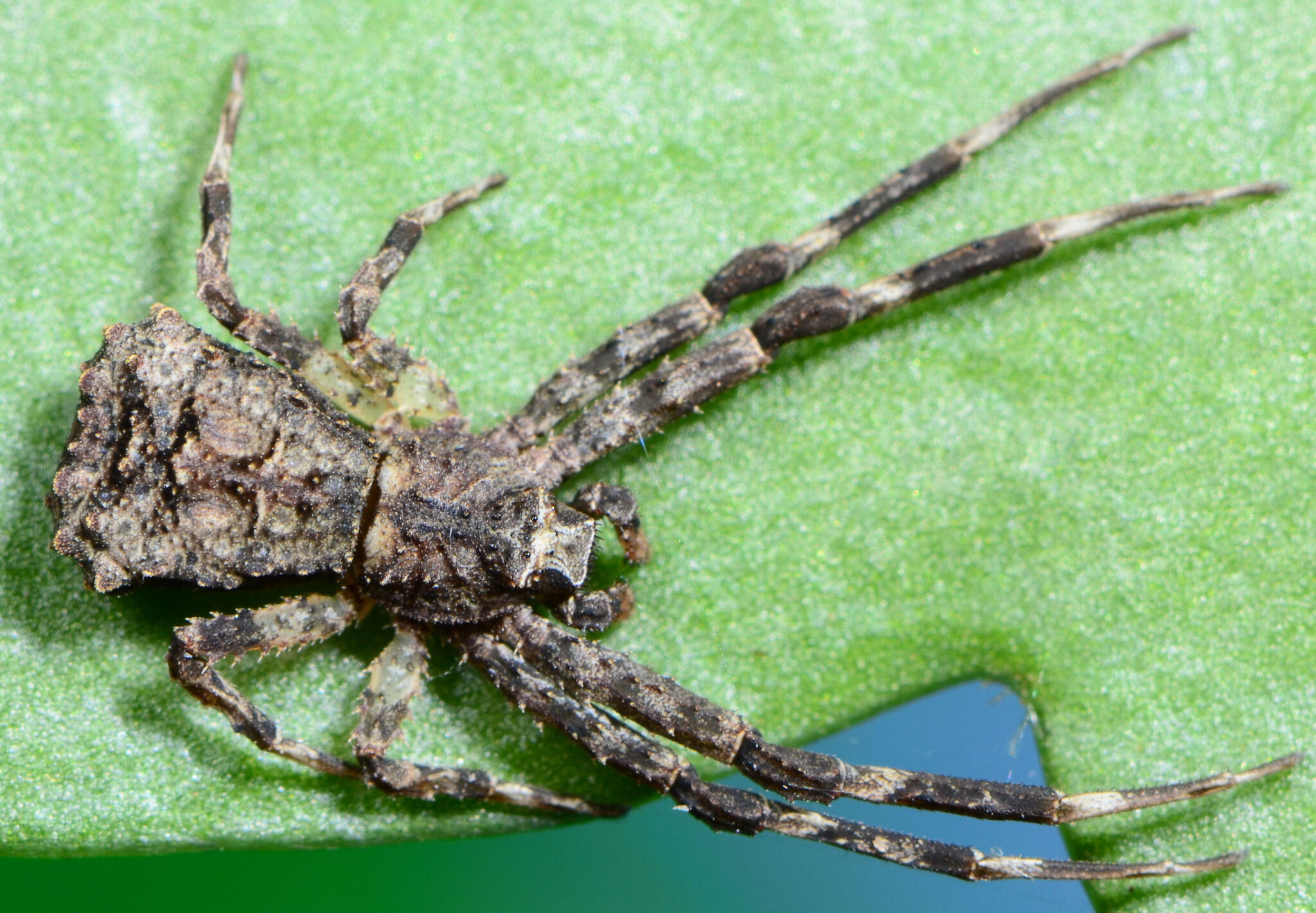
- female
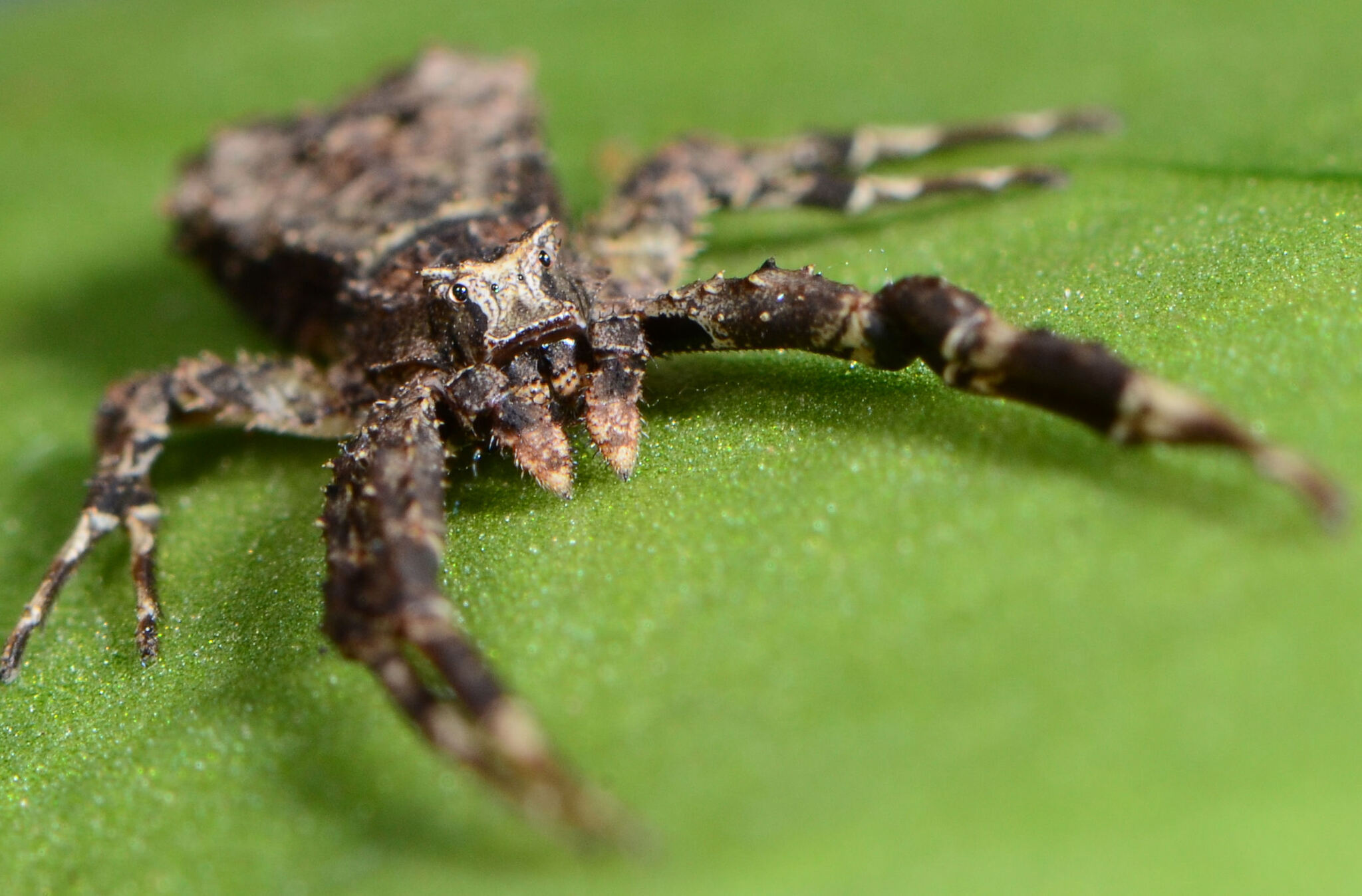
- female

Scientific classification
- Kingdom: Animalia
- Phylum: Arthropoda
- Subphylum: Chelicerata
- Class: Arachnida
- Order: Araneae
- Infraorder: Araneomorphae
- Family: Thomisidae
- Genus: Simorcus
- Species: S. cotti

Binomial name
- Simorcus cotti Lessert, 1936

Synonyms
- Simorcus zuluanus Lawrence, 1942

= Simorcus cotti =

Cotti's Simorcus Crab Spider

Species of spider

Simorcus cotti is a species of spider in the family Thomisidae. It is commonly known as Cotti's Simorcus crab spider and occurs in several African countries.

== Distribution ==
Simorcus cotti is known from Tanzania, Mozambique, Eswatini, and South Africa.

In South Africa, the species has been documented from Eastern Cape, Gauteng, KwaZulu-Natal, Limpopo, and Mpumalanga.

== Habitat and ecology ==
Simorcus cotti was collected by beating and sweeping grass, trees, shrubs, and herbs in Forest, Grassland, Indian Ocean Coastal Belt, and Savanna biomes, at altitudes ranging from 4 to 1,758 m.

The species has been collected from various tree species, including:

- several Acacia species
- Aloe marlothii
- Burkea africana
- Croton sylvaticus
- Helichrysum species
- Panicum species
- fever trees
- Pappea capensis
- Philenoptera violacea
- Pterocarpus rotundifolius
- Sclerocarya birrea
- Spigumnosporia species
- Spirostachus africana
- Terminalia sericea woodland.

Adult males were sampled from November to March and females from December to March. The species has also been sampled from citrus orchards.

== Description ==
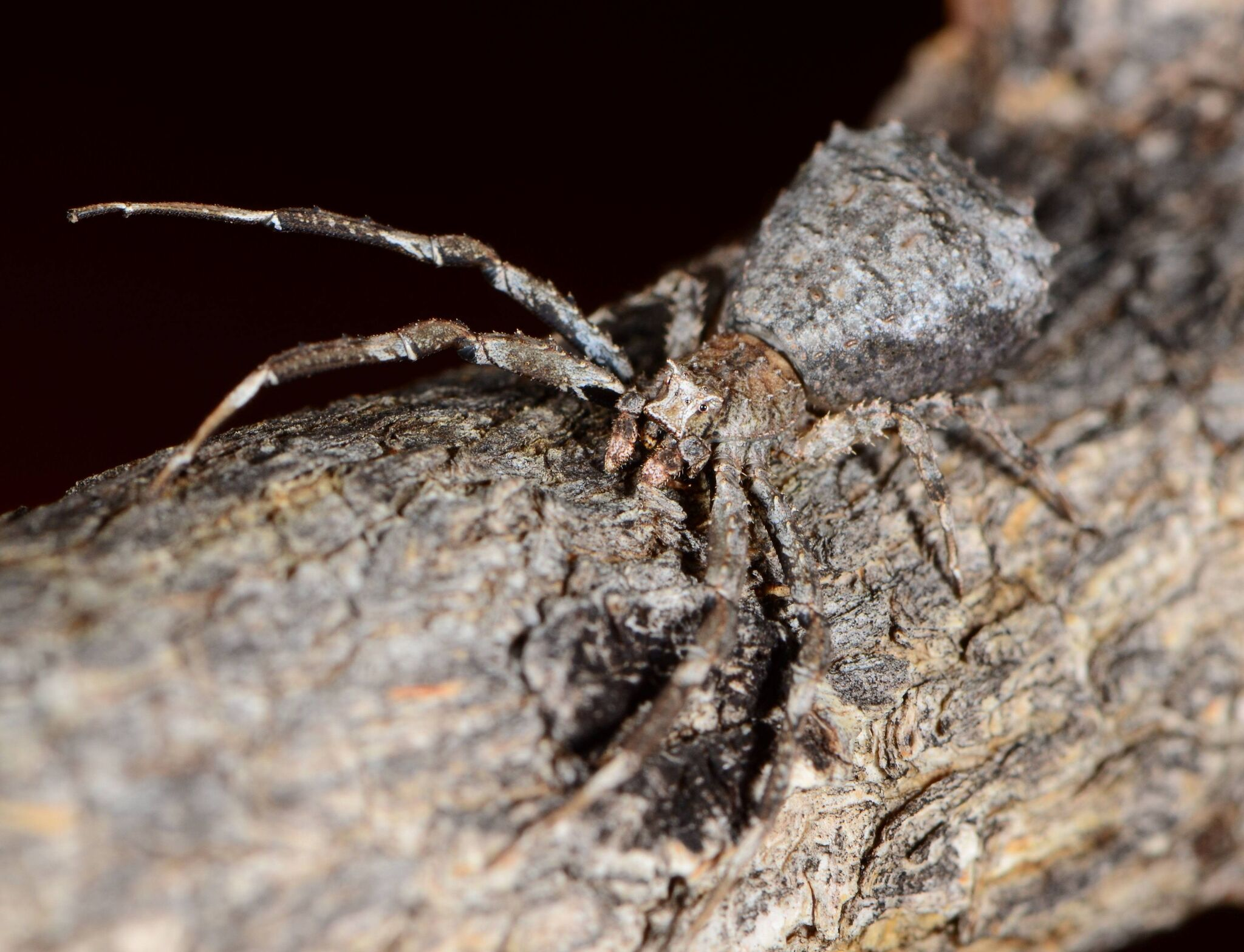
female

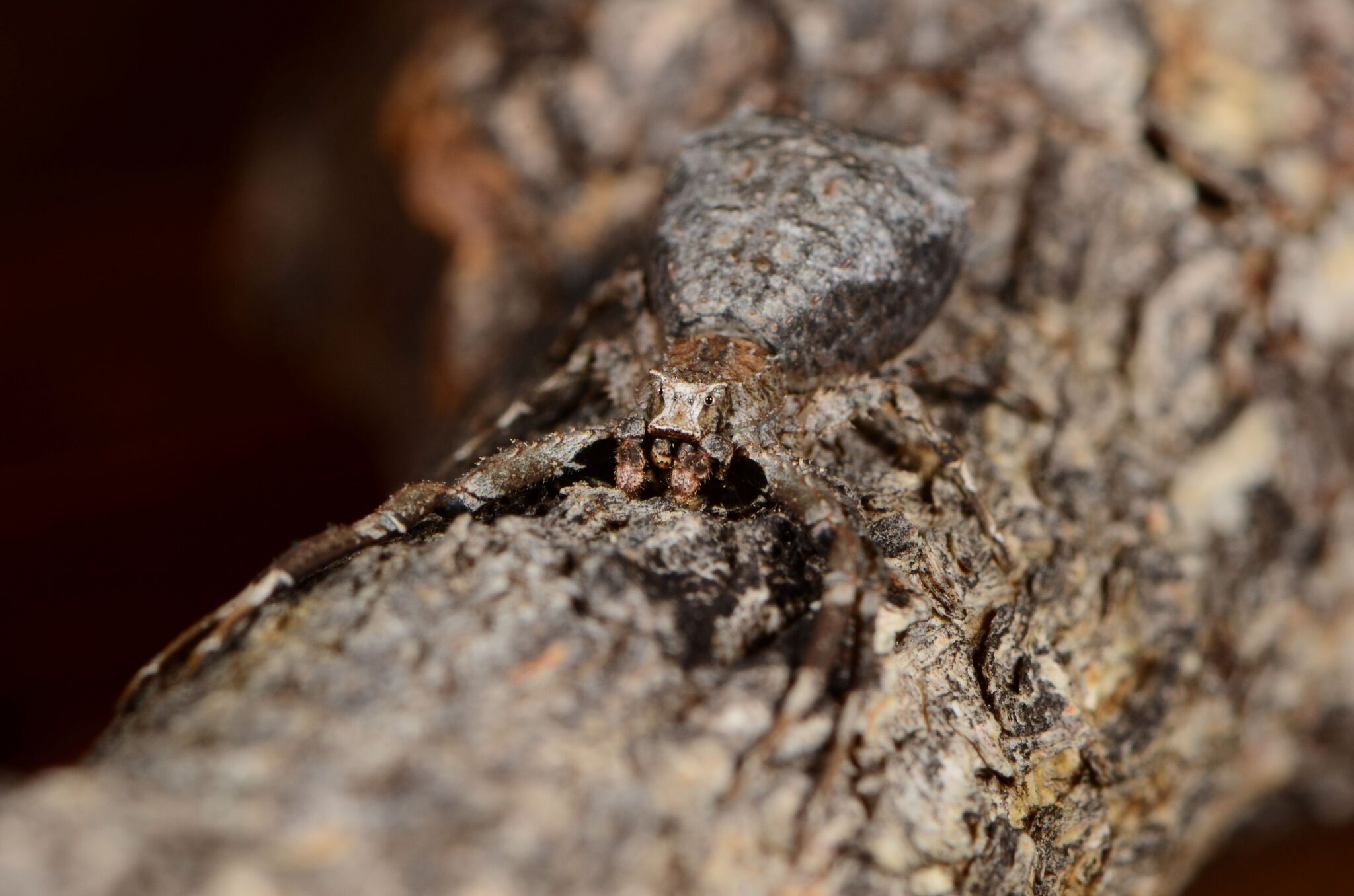
female

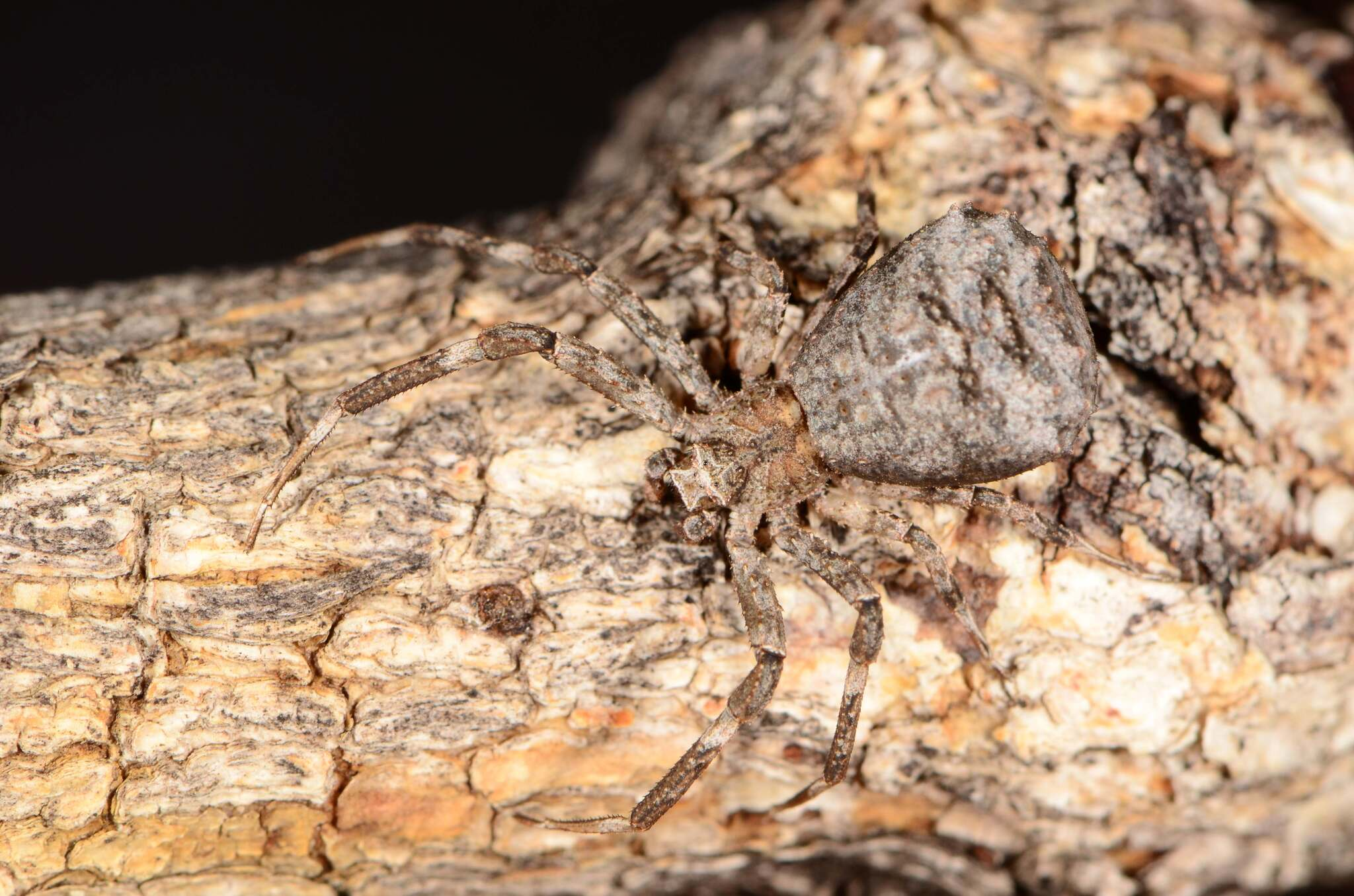
female

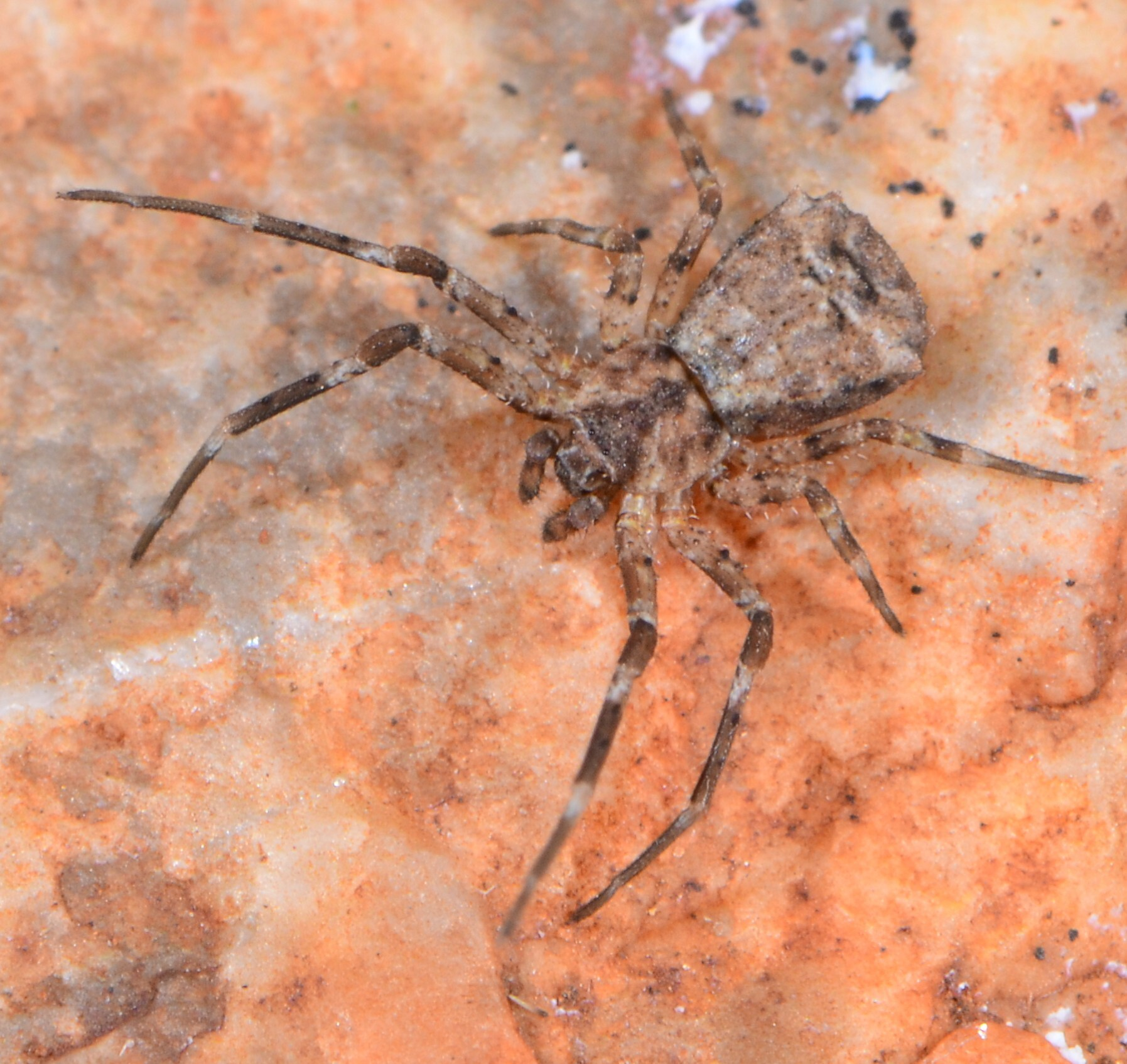
female

== Conservation ==
Simorcus cotti is listed as Least Concern due to its wide geographical range. The species is recorded in more than ten protected areas throughout South Africa.

== Etymology ==
The species is named after B.-B. Cott, who collected specimens during the expedition to Portuguese East Africa.

== Taxonomy ==
Simorcus cotti was described by Roger de Lessert in 1936 from Mozambique. Van Niekerk and Dippenaar-Schoeman synonymized Simorcus zuluanus with this species in 2010. The species was revised by Van Niekerk and Dippenaar-Schoeman in 2010 and is known from both sexes.
