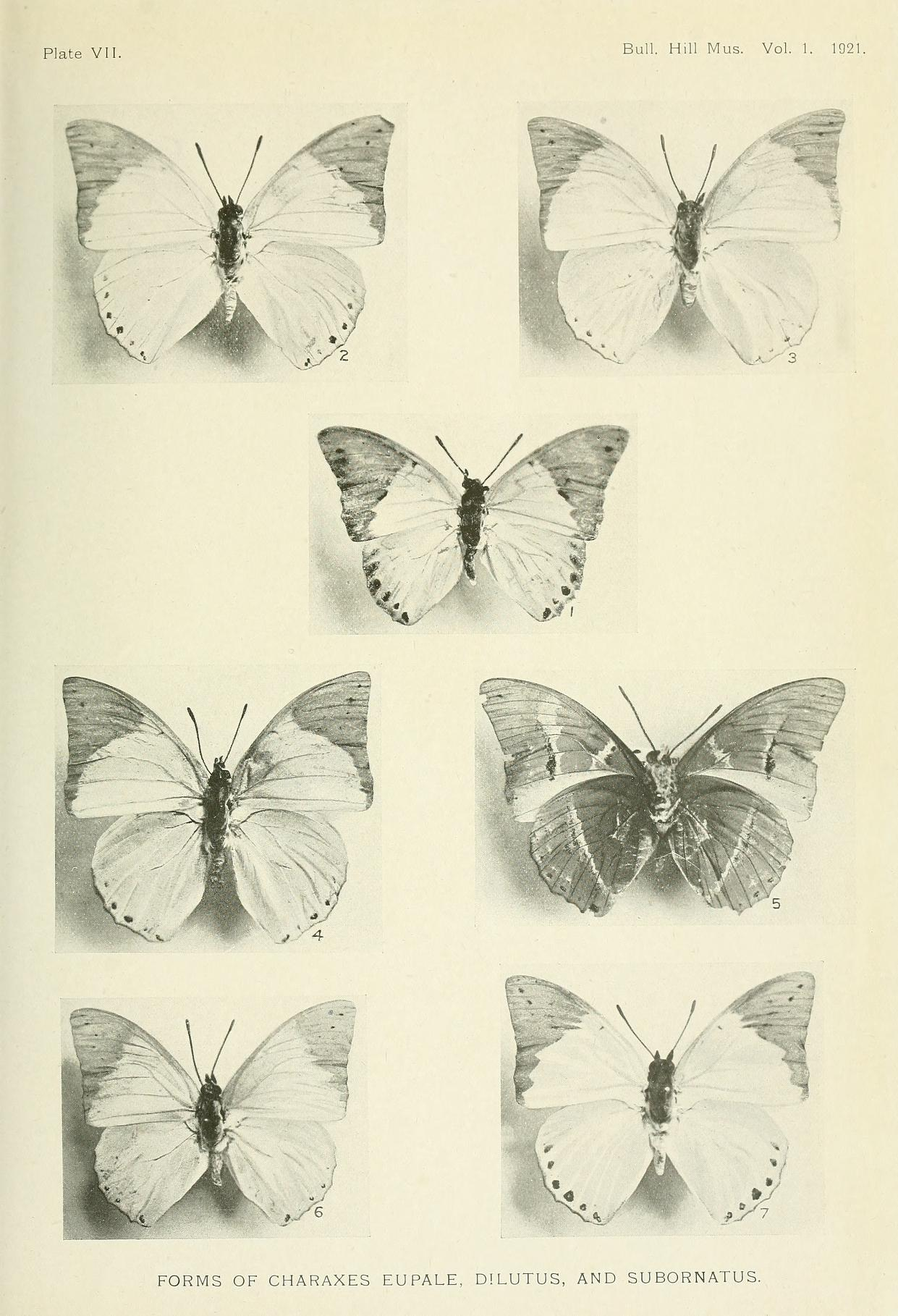

Scientific classification
- Kingdom: Animalia
- Phylum: Arthropoda
- Clade: Pancrustacea
- Class: Insecta
- Order: Lepidoptera
- Family: Nymphalidae
- Subfamily: Charaxinae
- Tribe: Charaxini
- Genus: Charaxes
- Species: C. subornatus

Binomial name
- Charaxes subornatus Schultze, 1916

= Charaxes subornatus =

Species of butterfly

Charaxes subornatus, the ornate green charaxes, is a butterfly in the family Nymphalidae. It is found in Ivory Coast, Ghana, Togo, Nigeria, Cameroon, the Central African Republic, the Republic of the Congo, Gabon, the Democratic Republic of the Congo, Uganda and Kenya. The habitat consists of evergreen forests.

The larvae feed on Albizia - A. brownei, A. gummifera and A. zygia.

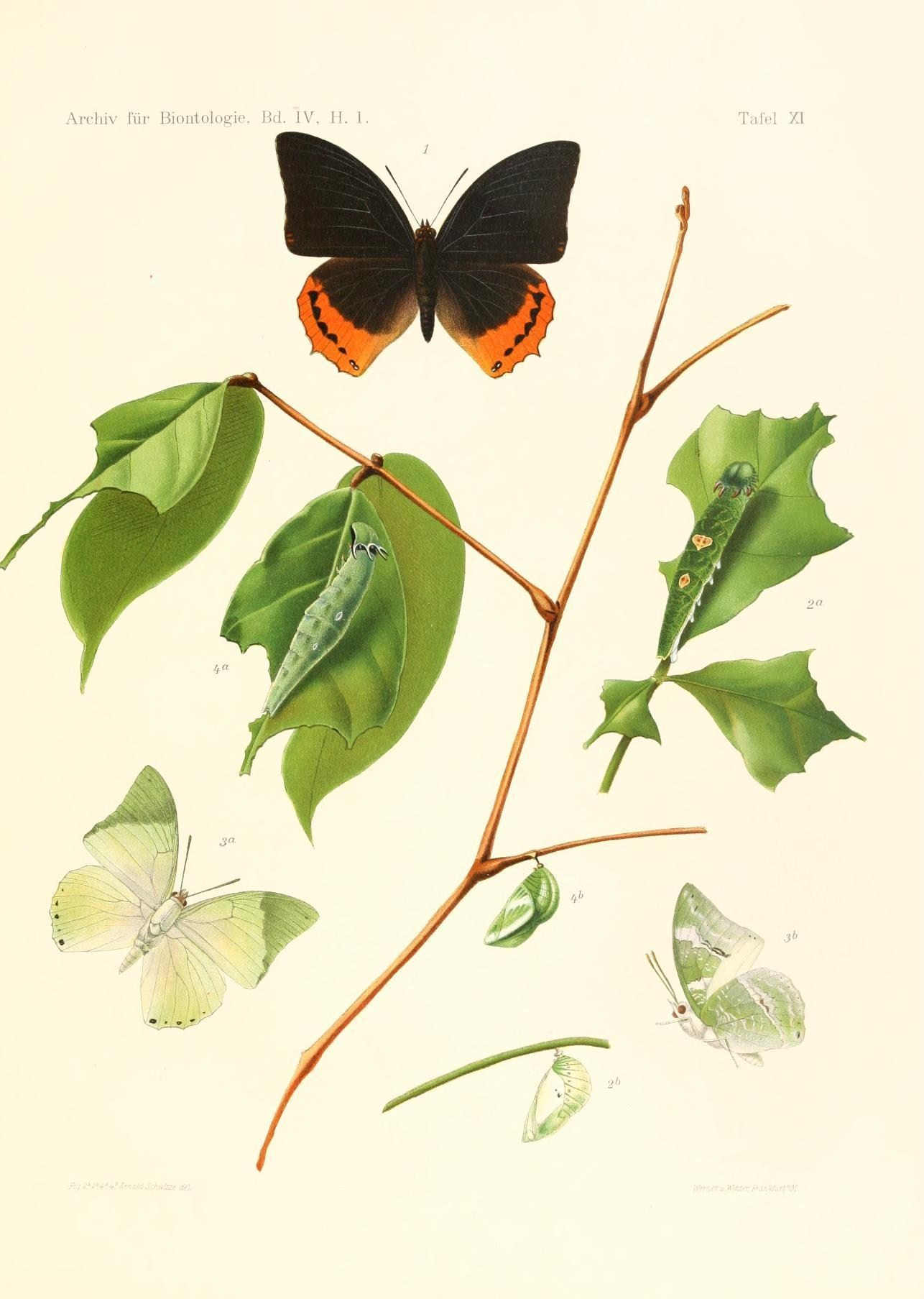
Charaxes subornatus and Charaxes protoclea

== Subspecies ==
- Charaxes subornatus subornatus (eastern Nigeria, Cameroon, Gabon, Congo, Central African Republic, northern and western Democratic Republic of the Congo)
- Charaxes subornatus couilloudi Plantrou, 1976 (Ivory Coast, Ghana, Togo, western Nigeria)
- Charaxes subornatus minor Joicey & Talbot, 1921 (Democratic Republic of the Congo, Uganda, north-western Kenya) is considered by some authorities to be a full species

== Similar species ==
Charaxes subornatus is in the Charaxes eupale species group (clade). The clade members are:

- Charaxes subornatus
- Charaxes eupale
- Charaxes dilutus
- Charaxes montis
- Charaxes minor
- Charaxes schiltzei
- Charaxes schultzei
- Charaxes virescens

Bouyer et al., 2008 erected the genus Viridixes Bouyer & Vingerhoedt, 2008 to accommodate species belonging to the eupale species group.

== Realm ==
Afrotropical realm
