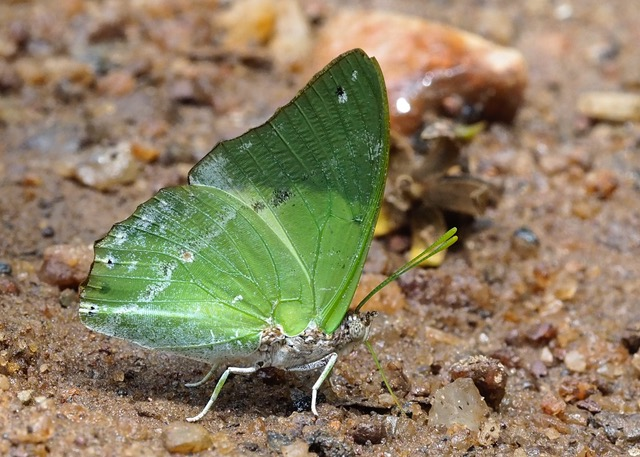

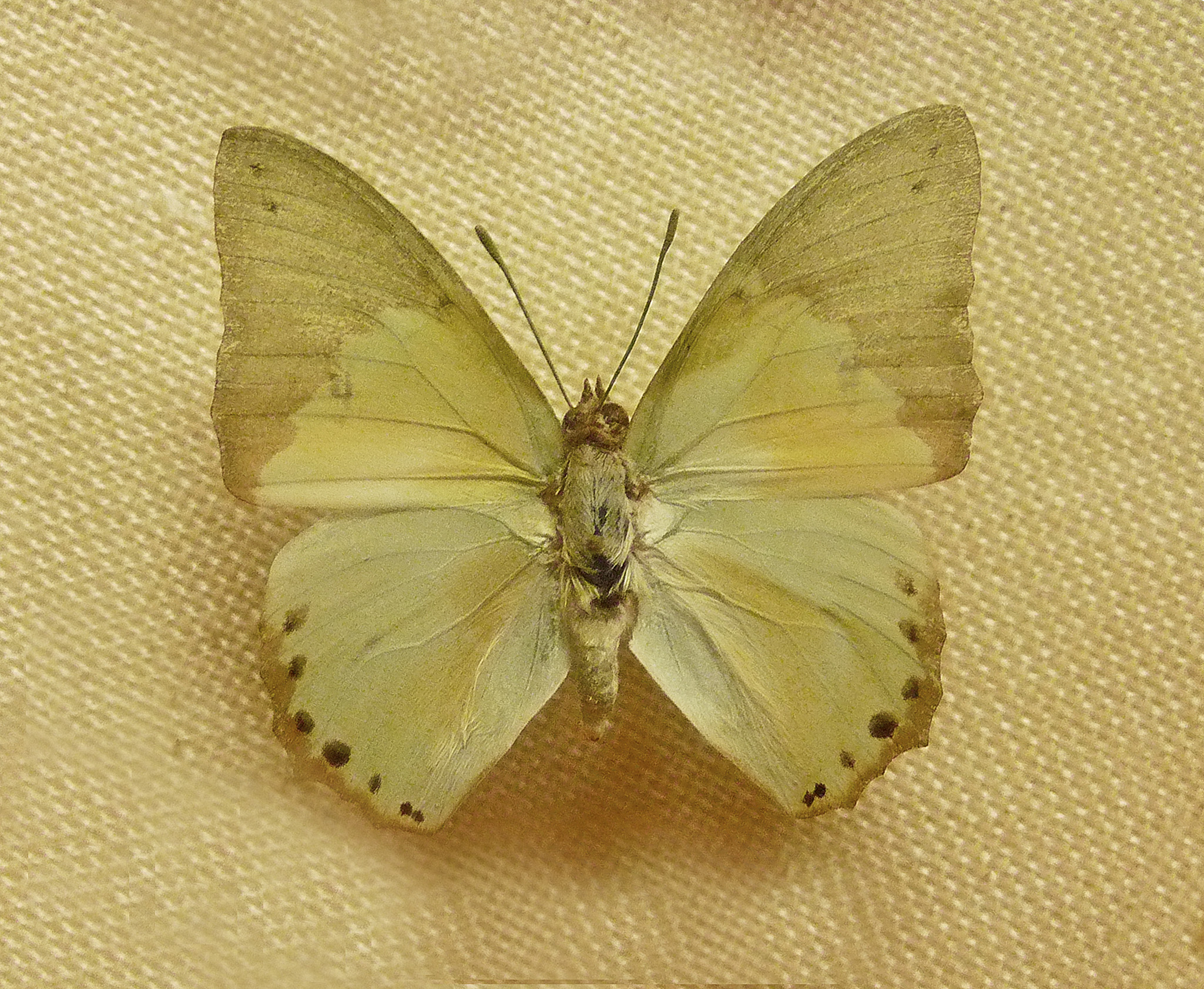

Scientific classification
- Kingdom: Animalia
- Phylum: Arthropoda
- Clade: Pancrustacea
- Class: Insecta
- Order: Lepidoptera
- Family: Nymphalidae
- Genus: Charaxes
- Species: C. eupale

Binomial name
- Charaxes eupale (Drury, 1782)

Synonyms
- Papilio eupale Drury, 1782; Papilio amasia Fabricius, 1793; Charaxes schultzei Röber, 1936; Charaxes eupale f. citrinella Rousseau-Decelle, 1938; Charaxes eupale f. inornata Storace, 1948; Charaxes dilutus veneris White & Grant, 1989; Charaxes dilutus kasitu White & Grant, 1989; Charaxes dilutus ngonga van Someren, 1974

= Charaxes eupale =

Common green charaxes

Species of butterfly

Charaxes eupale, the common green charaxes, is a butterfly in the family Nymphalidae. It is found in Senegal, Guinea, Sierra Leone, Liberia, Ivory Coast, Ghana, Togo, Nigeria, Cameroon, Gabon, the Republic of the Congo, the Central African Republic, Angola, Zambia, the Democratic Republic of the Congo, Uganda, Sudan, Rwanda, Kenya, Tanzania and Malawi.

== Biology ==
C. eupale is the most common forest charaxes. The habitat consists of lowland evergreen forests.

The larvae feed on Scutia myrtina, Albizia gummifera, Albizia zygia, Albizia adianthifolia and Cathormion species.

Notes on the biology of C. eupale are given by Larsen, T.B. (1991).

The green colouration is produced by pigments as opposed to being produced structurally, which is common in most green butterflies.

== Description ==
A full description is given by Rothschild, W. And Jordan, K., 1900 Novitates Zoologicae Volume 7:510 et seq. (for terms see Novitates Zoologicae Volume 5:545-601 )

== Subspecies ==
- Charaxes eupale eupale (Senegal, Guinea, Sierra Leone, Liberia, Ivory Coast, Ghana, Togo, Nigeria)
- Charaxes eupale latimargo Joicey & Talbot, 1921(south-eastern Nigeria, Cameroon, Gabon, Congo, Central African Republic, northern Angola, Democratic Republic of the Congo, southern Sudan, Uganda, Rwanda, western Kenya, north-western Tanzania)
- Charaxes eupale veneris White & Grant, 1989 (Malawi, Tanzania, northern Zambia)

Torben Larsen developed a species numbering system for his 2005 publication Butterflies of West Africa. The nominate subspecies is #756. The 'Larsen' numbers have since been used with permission in A Sharp Eye on Butterflies of Ghana.

== Similar species ==
Similar to Charaxes dilutus but apical green patch darker and hind wing with a dark green margin.

Charaxes eupale is in the Charaxes eupale species group (clade) The clade members are:

- Charaxes subornatus
- Charaxes eupale
- Charaxes dilutus
- Charaxes montis
- Charaxes minor
- Charaxes schiltzei
- Charaxes schultzei
- Charaxes virescens

Bouyer et al., 2008 erected the genus Viridixes Bouyer & Vingerhoedt, 2008 to accommodate species belonging to the eupale species group.

== Realm ==
Afrotropical realm
