= Philenoptera kanurii =

Conservation status
- Endangered (IUCN 2.3)

Scientific classification
- Kingdom: Plantae
- Clade: Tracheophytes
- Clade: Angiosperms
- Clade: Eudicots
- Clade: Rosids
- Order: Fabales
- Family: Fabaceae
- Subfamily: Faboideae
- Genus: Philenoptera
- Species: P. kanurii

Binomial name
- Philenoptera kanurii (Brenan & J.B.Gillett) Schrire

Synonyms
- Lonchocarpus kanurii Brenan & J.B.Gillett

Species of legume

Philenoptera kanurii, synonym Lonchocarpus kanurii, is a species of legume in the family Fabaceae. It is native to Kenya and Somalia. It is threatened by habitat loss.
