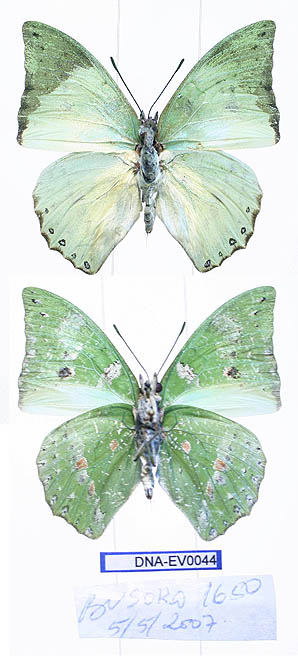

Scientific classification
- Kingdom: Animalia
- Phylum: Arthropoda
- Clade: Pancrustacea
- Class: Insecta
- Order: Lepidoptera
- Family: Nymphalidae
- Genus: Charaxes
- Species: C. montis

Binomial name
- Charaxes montis Jackson, 1956

= Charaxes montis =

Species of butterfly

Charaxes montis is a butterfly in the family Nymphalidae. It is found in the Democratic Republic of the Congo, south-western Uganda, Rwanda and Burundi. The habitat consists of montane forests.

The larvae feed on Albizia gummifera.

== Taxonomy ==
Described as a subspecies of Charaxes dilutus, later regarded as a full species by Victor Van Someren.

== Similar species ==
Charaxes subornatus is in the Charaxes eupale species group (clade). The clade members are:

- Charaxes subornatus
- Charaxes eupale
- Charaxes dilutus
- Charaxes montis
- Charaxes minor
- Charaxes schiltzei
- Charaxes schultzei
- Charaxes virescens

Bouyer et al., 2008 erected the genus Viridixes Bouyer & Vingerhoedt, 2008 to accommodate species belonging to the eupale species group.

== Realm ==
Afrotropical realm
