= Simorcus lotzi =

Lotz's Simorcus Crab Spider

Scientific classification
- Kingdom: Animalia
- Phylum: Arthropoda
- Subphylum: Chelicerata
- Class: Arachnida
- Order: Araneae
- Infraorder: Araneomorphae
- Family: Thomisidae
- Genus: Simorcus
- Species: S. lotzi

Binomial name
- Simorcus lotzi van Niekerk & Dippenaar-Schoeman, 2010

Species of spider

Simorcus lotzi is a species of spider in the family Thomisidae. It is commonly known as Lotz's Simorcus crab spider and occurs in southern Africa.

== Distribution ==
Simorcus lotzi is known from Namibia, Botswana, and South Africa.

In South Africa, the species has been recorded from Free State (Bloemfontein Botanical Gardens) and Limpopo (Naboomspruit).

== Habitat and ecology ==
Simorcus lotzi are found on foliage and the bark of trees, shrubs, and herbs from Grassland and Savanna biomes, at altitudes ranging from 1,126 to 1,429 m.

The species was collected by beating vegetation and pitfall traps. Males were collected in December to February.

== Conservation ==
Simorcus lotzi is listed as Least Concern due to its wide geographical range. The species is protected in the Bloemfontein National Botanical Gardens.

== Etymology ==
The species is named after South African arachnologist Leon N. Lotz.

== Taxonomy ==
Simorcus lotzi was described by van Niekerk and Dippenaar-Schoeman in 2010 from Bloemfontein. The species was revised by Van Niekerk and Dippenaar-Schoeman in 2010 and is known only from the male. A female has been collected but not yet described.
