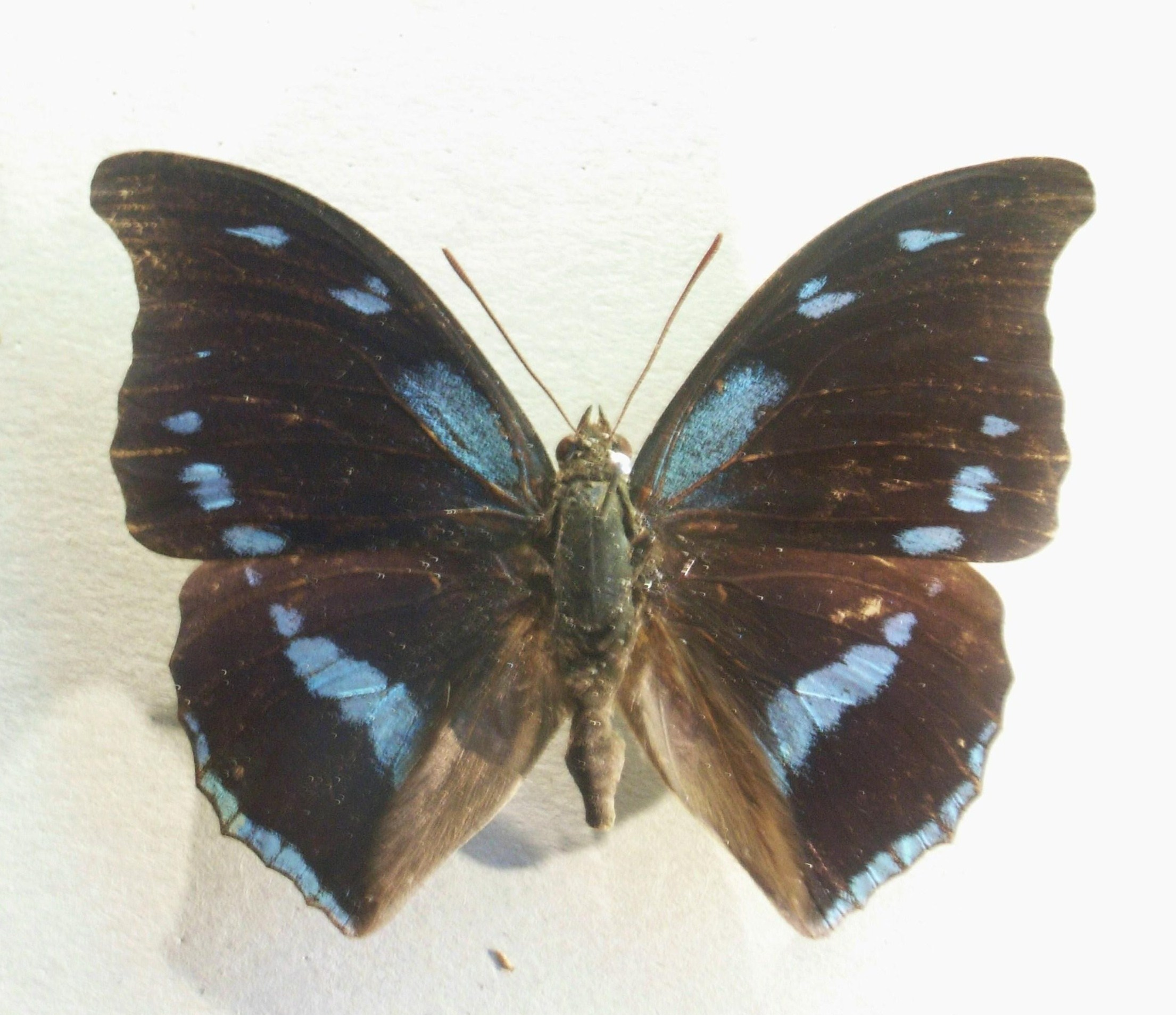

Scientific classification
- Domain: Eukaryota
- Kingdom: Animalia
- Phylum: Arthropoda
- Class: Insecta
- Order: Lepidoptera
- Family: Nymphalidae
- Genus: Charaxes
- Species: C. mycerina

Binomial name
- Charaxes mycerina (Godart, 1824)

Synonyms
- Nymphalis mycerina Godart, 1824; Charaxes nausicaa Staudinger, 1891; Charaxes mycerina vietti Plantrou, 1978

= Charaxes mycerina =

Species of butterfly

Charaxes mycerina, the mycerina untailed charaxes, is a butterfly in the family Nymphalidae. It is found in Sierra Leone, Liberia, Ivory Coast, Ghana, Nigeria, Cameroon, the Central African Republic, the Republic of the Congo, Gabon, the Democratic Republic of the Congo and Equatorial Guinea. The habitat consists of lowland evergreen forests. It is an uncommon species.

== Description ==
Very similar to Charaxes doubledayi and similar to other members of the Charaxes lycurgus group but forewing upperside without marginal marks. Hindwing with almost contiguous blue marginal lines.

== Subspecies ==
- Charaxes mycerina mycerina (Sierra Leone, Liberia, Ivory Coast, Ghana, western Nigeria)
- Charaxes mycerina nausicaa Staudinger, 1891 (eastern Nigeria, Cameroon, Central African Republic, Congo, Gabon, Democratic Republic of the Congo, Bioko)

== Taxonomy ==
Charaxes mycerina is a member of the species group Charaxes lycurgus. The supposed clade members are:

Clade 1

- Charaxes lycurgus nominate
- Charaxes porthos
- Charaxes zelica

Clade 2

- Charaxes mycerina
- Charaxes doubledayi
