= Charaxes virescens =

Scientific classification
- Kingdom: Animalia
- Phylum: Arthropoda
- Clade: Pancrustacea
- Class: Insecta
- Order: Lepidoptera
- Family: Nymphalidae
- Genus: Charaxes
- Species: C. virescens

Binomial name
- Charaxes virescens Bouyer, 1991

Species of butterfly

Charaxes virescens is a butterfly in the family Nymphalidae. It is found in the Shaba region in the Democratic Republic of the Congo.

== Similar species ==
Charaxes virescens is in the Charaxes eupale species group (clade). The clade members are:

- Charaxes subornatus
- Charaxes eupale
- Charaxes dilutus
- Charaxes montis
- Charaxes minor
- Charaxes schiltzei
- Charaxes schultzei
- Charaxes virescens

Bouyer et al., 2008 erected the genus Viridixes Bouyer & Vingerhoedt, 2008 to accommodate species belonging to the eupale species group.

== Realm ==
Afrotropical realm
