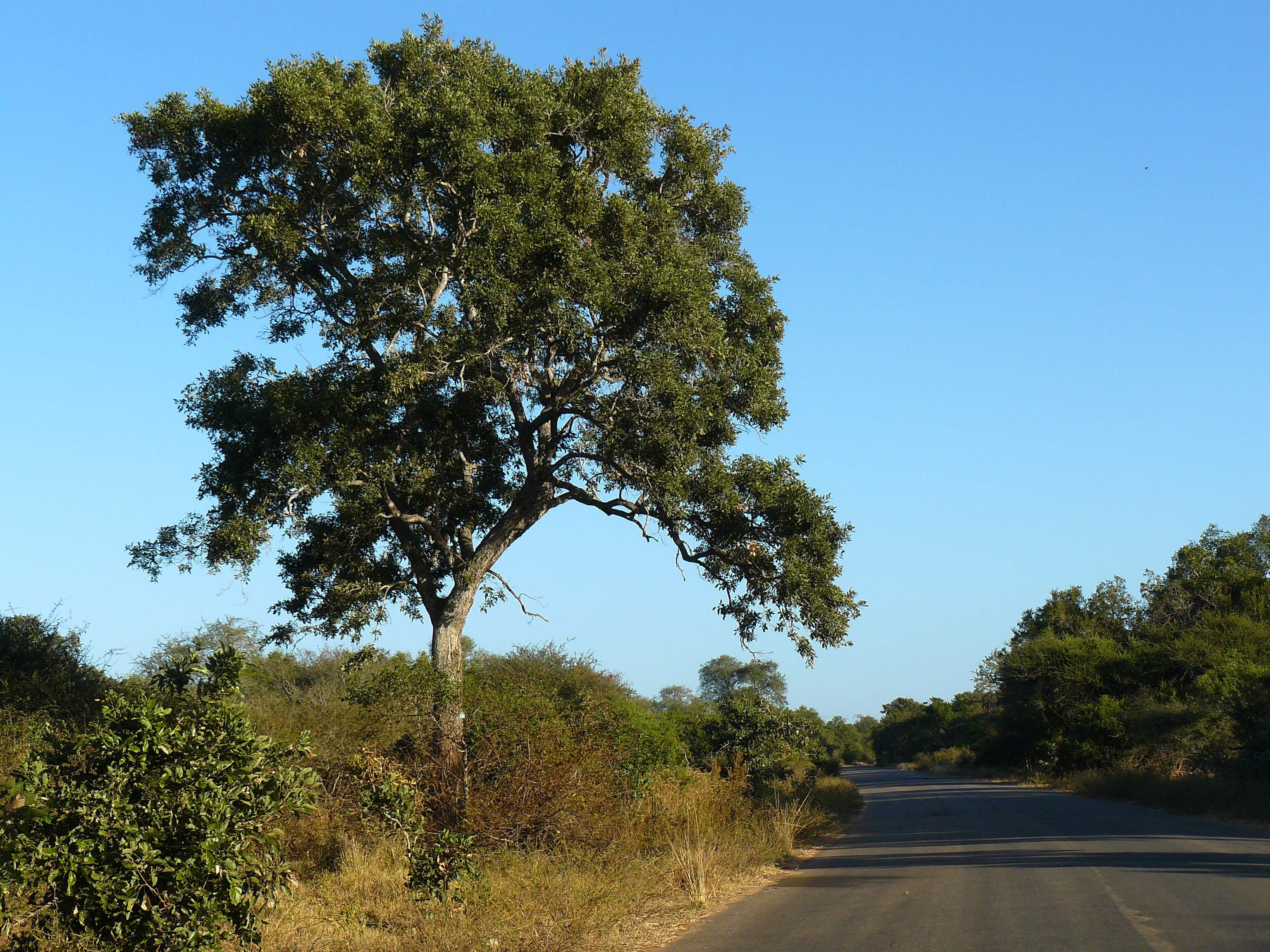
- Apple-leaf tree in the Kruger Park

Scientific classification
- Kingdom: Plantae
- Clade: Tracheophytes
- Clade: Angiosperms
- Clade: Eudicots
- Clade: Rosids
- Order: Fabales
- Family: Fabaceae
- Subfamily: Faboideae
- Tribe: Millettieae
- Genus: Philenoptera; Hochst. ex A. Rich. (1848)

Species
- 11; see text

= Philenoptera =

Genus of legumes

Philenoptera is a genus of flowering plants in the legume family, Fabaceae. It includes 11 species of trees, shrubs, and more rarely lianas native to sub-Saharan Africa. Typical habitats include seasonally-dry tropical forest, woodland, wooded grassland, and bushland. Four species are native to the Zambezian region, 3 species to the Sudanian region, 2 species to the Zanzibar-Inhambane and Tongaland-Pondoland regions, 1 species to the Somali-Masai region, 1 species to the Guineo-Congolian region, and 1 to Madagascar.

== Species ==
As of September 2023, Plants of the World Online accepted the following species:

- Philenoptera bussei (Harms) Schrire
- Philenoptera cyanescens (Schumach. & Thonn.) Roberty
- Philenoptera eriocalyx (Harms) Schrire
- Philenoptera kanurii (Brenan & J.B.Gillett) Schrire
- Philenoptera katangensis (De Wild.) Schrire
- Philenoptera laxiflora (Guill. & Perr.) Roberty
- Philenoptera nelsii (Schinz) Schrire
- Philenoptera pallescens (Welw. ex Baker) Schrire
- Philenoptera sutherlandii (Harv.) Schrire
- Philenoptera violacea (Klotzsch) Schrire
- Philenoptera wankieensis (Mendonça & E.P.Sousa) Lock
