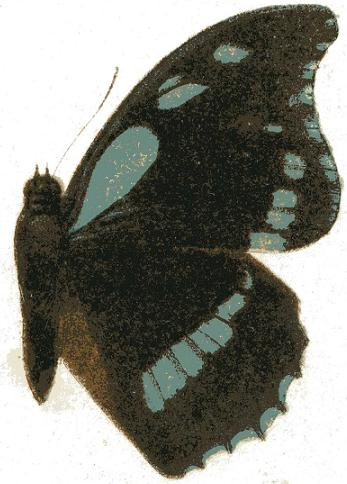

Scientific classification
- Kingdom: Animalia
- Phylum: Arthropoda
- Class: Insecta
- Order: Lepidoptera
- Family: Nymphalidae
- Genus: Charaxes
- Species: C. doubledayi

Binomial name
- Charaxes doubledayi Aurivillius, 1899

Synonyms
- Charaxes doubledayi ab. viridis Röber, 1936

= Charaxes doubledayi =

Species of butterfly

Charaxes doubledayi, Doubleday's untailed charaxes, is a butterfly in the family Nymphalidae. It is found in Sierra Leone, Ivory Coast, Ghana, Togo, Nigeria, Cameroon, Bioko, the Republic of the Congo, the Central African Republic, the Democratic Republic of the Congo and western Tanzania. The habitat consists of lowland tropical evergreen forests. It is a very rare butterfly

== Description ==
Very similar to Charaxes mycerina but antennae much darker, the blue scaling in the cell of the forewing denser and more extended, forewing with admarginal blue spots, band of hindwing of male not interrupted at R1. On the underside the cell-bar of forewing more straight, more obliquely placed, its upper end being only 1.5 mm. distant from base of R1, median bars also straighter, the bistre brown outer marginal band more sharply defined, the clay coloured area between it and the disco-postdiscal line divided by a band of bistre brown patches; median bar M2 SM2 straight or distally convex; costal median bar of hindwing 3 or 4 mm. more distal than bar C- SC2; the white borders of the bars of both wings much more prominent than in Charaxes mycerina; anal angle less produced.

== Taxonomy ==
Charaxes doubledayi is a member of the species group Charaxes lycurgus. The supposed clade members are:

Clade 1

- Charaxes lycurgus nominate
- Charaxes porthos
- Charaxes zelica

Clade 2

- Charaxes mycerina
- Charaxes doubledayi
