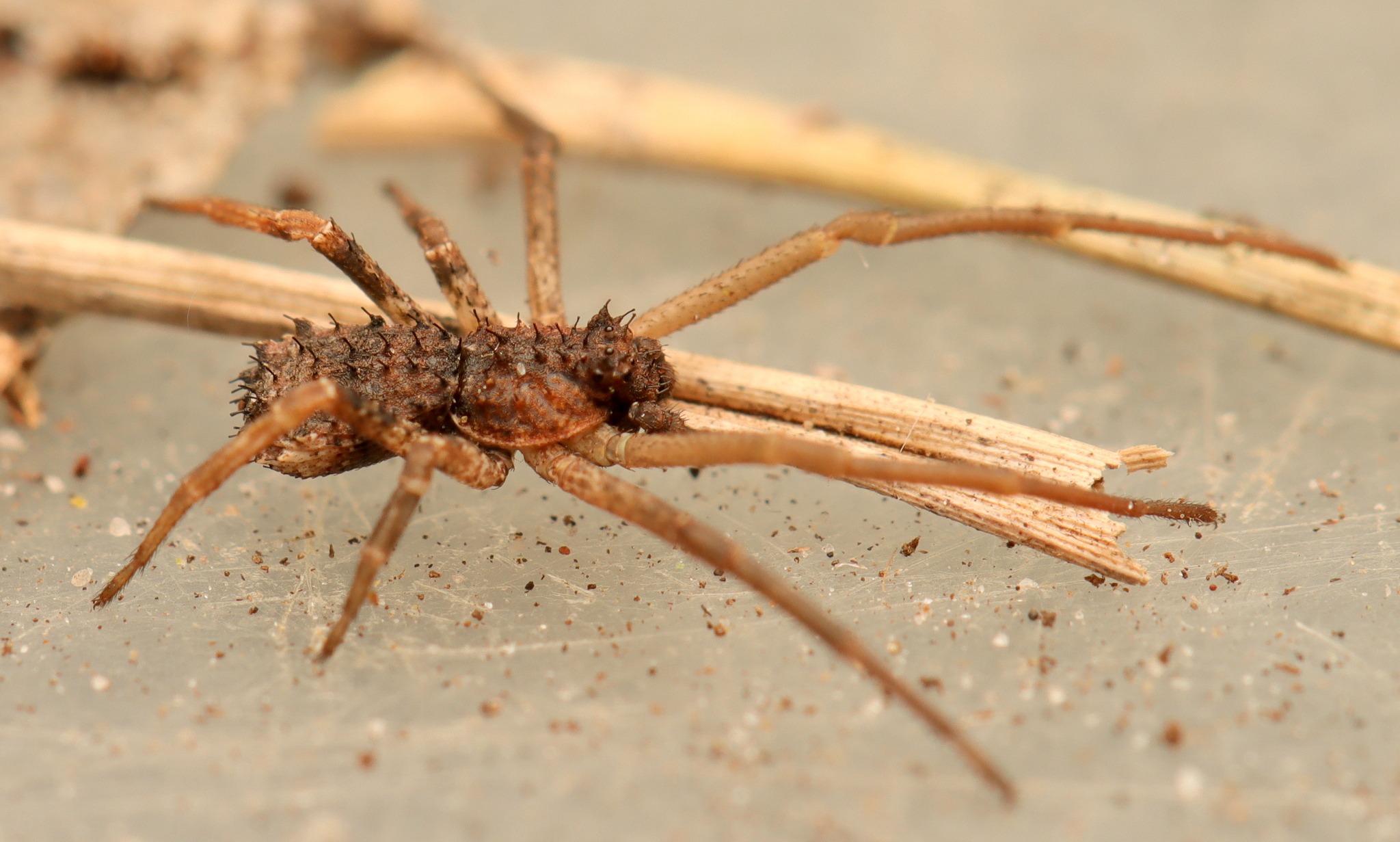

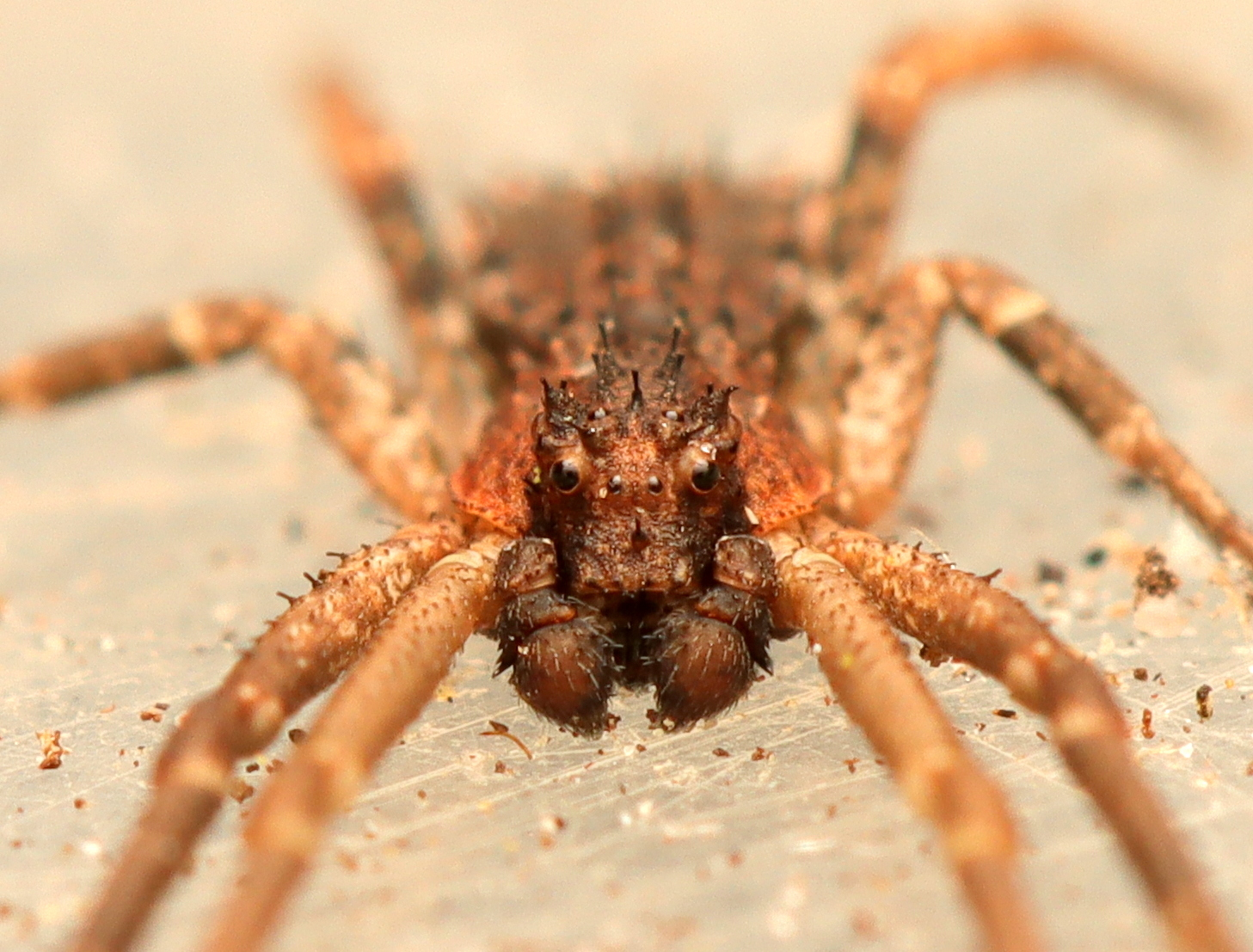

Scientific classification
- Kingdom: Animalia
- Phylum: Arthropoda
- Subphylum: Chelicerata
- Class: Arachnida
- Order: Araneae
- Infraorder: Araneomorphae
- Family: Thomisidae
- Genus: Simorcus
- Species: S. capensis

Binomial name
- Simorcus capensis Simon, 1895

= Simorcus capensis =

Cape Simorcus Crab Spider

Species of spider

Simorcus capensis is a species of spider in the family Thomisidae. It is commonly known as the Cape Simorcus crab spider and is found in Tanzania and South Africa.

== Distribution ==
Simorcus capensis is known from Tanzania and South Africa.

In South Africa, the species has been recorded from Eastern Cape (Alicedale, Great Fish River Wetland Park, Kudu Nature Reserve, Howiesons Poort), Northern Cape (Tswalu Kalahari Reserve, Rooipoort Nature Reserve), and Western Cape (Cape Town, De Hoop Nature Reserve, Marloth Nature Reserve, Kogelberg Nature Reserve).

== Habitat and ecology ==
Simorcus capensis are found on foliage and the bark of trees, shrubs, and herbs in Fynbos, Savanna, and Thicket biomes, at altitudes ranging from 1 to 1,155 m.

== Description ==
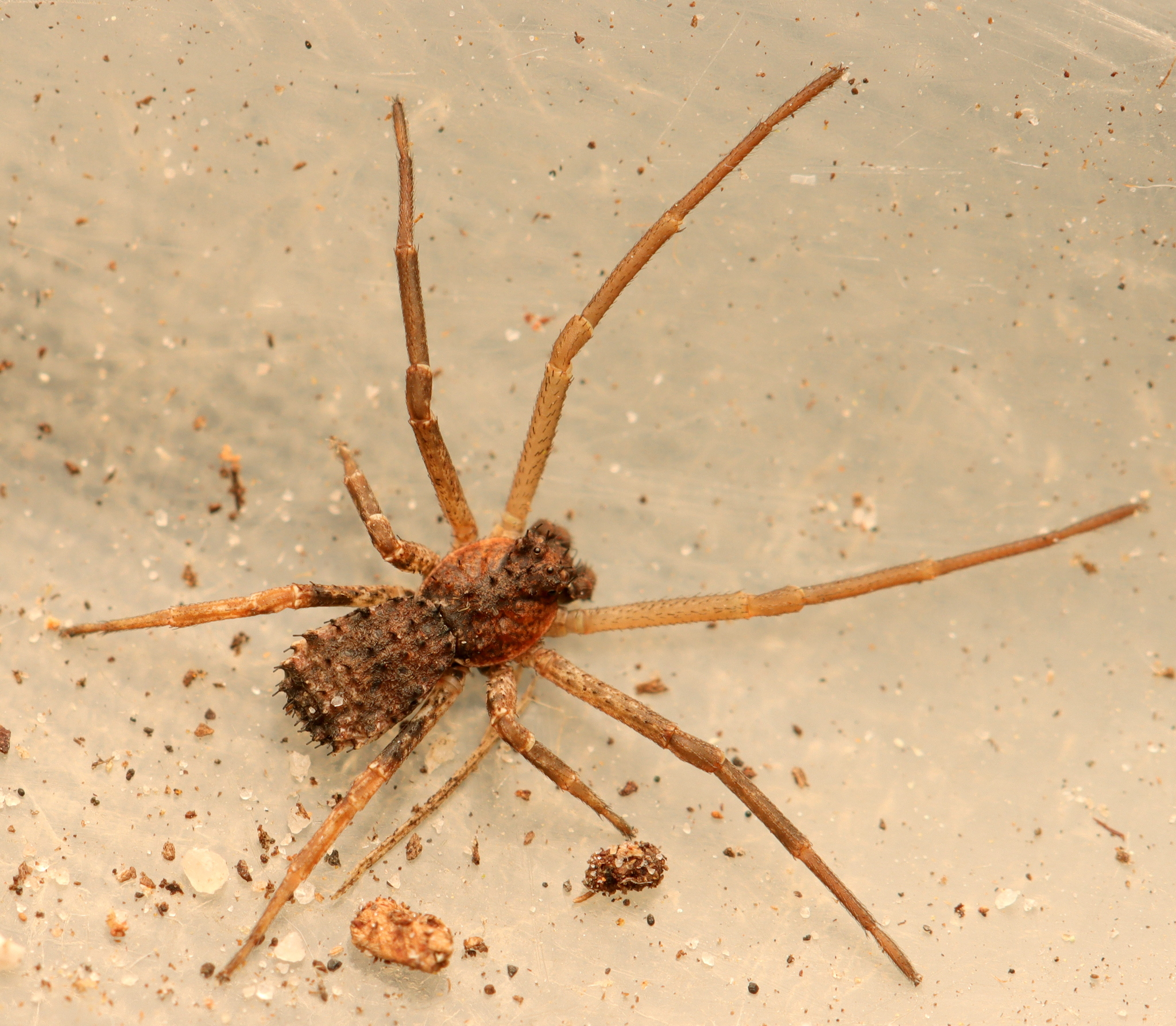

== Conservation ==
Simorcus capensis is listed as Least Concern due to its wide geographical range.

== Etymology ==
The species name capensis refers to the Cape Colony, the original type locality given by Eugène Simon.

== Taxonomy ==
Simorcus capensis was described by Eugène Simon in 1895 with the type locality given only as Cape Colony. The species is the type species of the genus Simorcus. It was revised by Van Niekerk and Dippenaar-Schoeman in 2010 and is known from both sexes.
