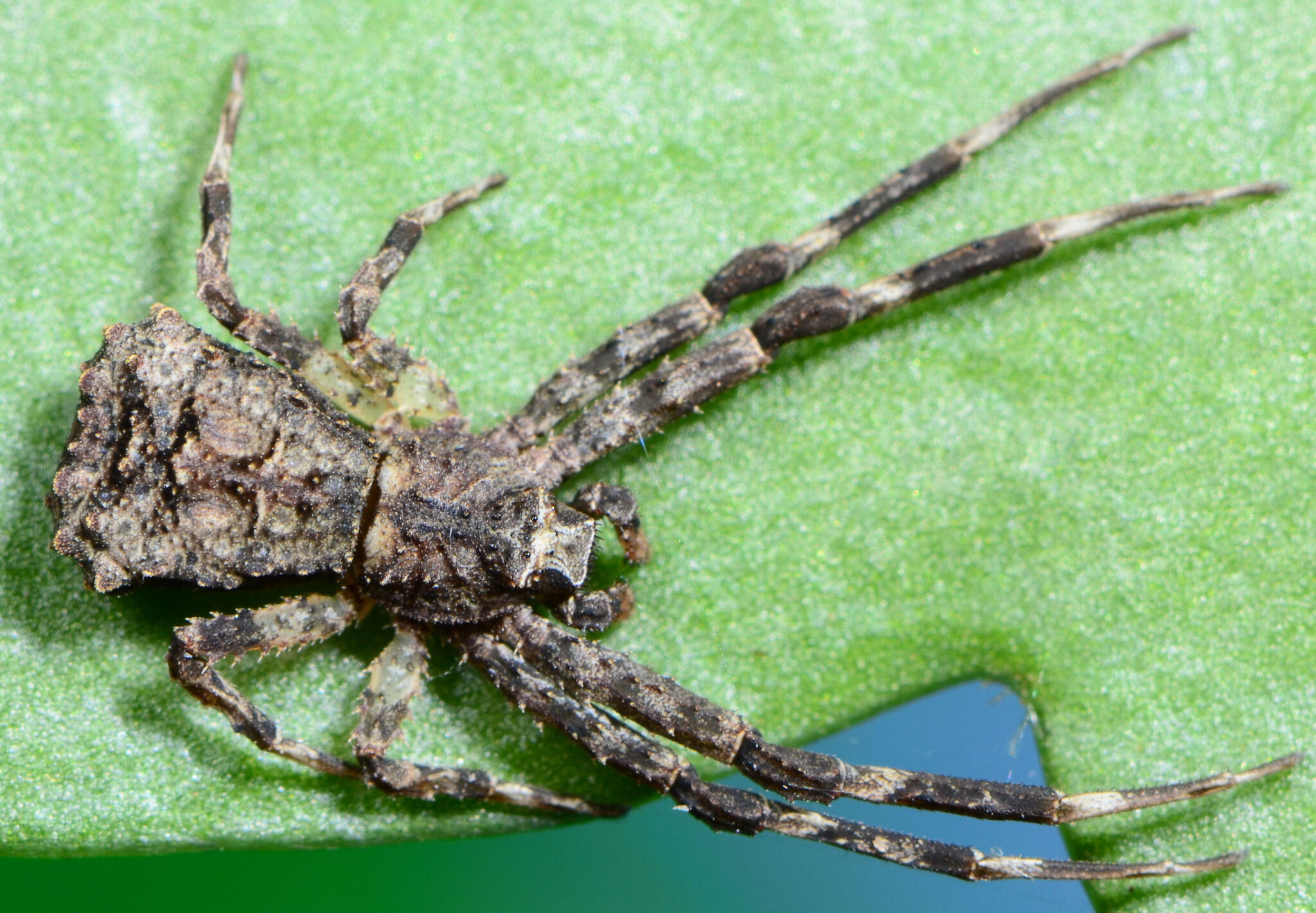
- female S. cotti from South Africa
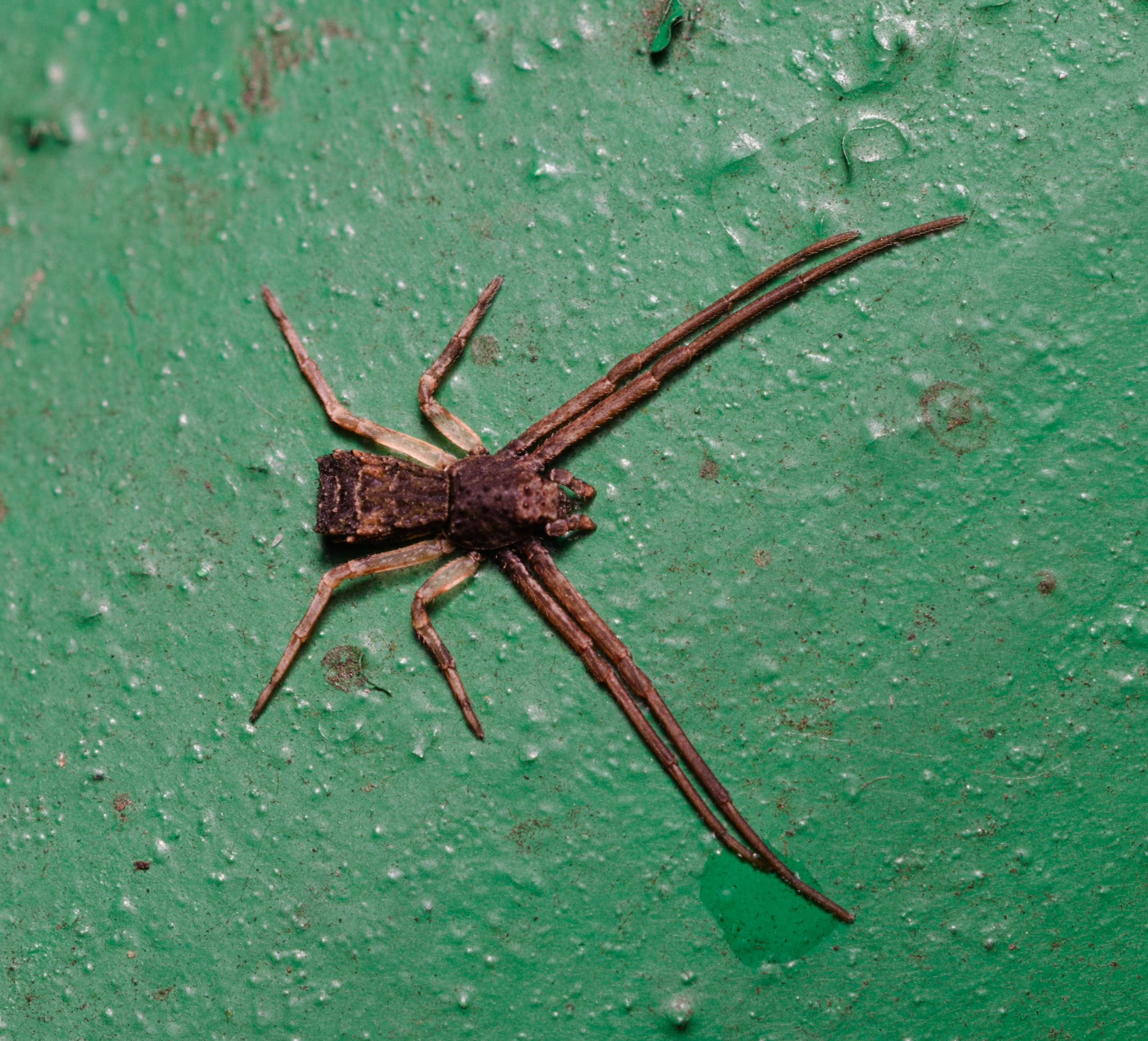
- S. asiaticus from Hong Kong

Scientific classification
- Kingdom: Animalia
- Phylum: Arthropoda
- Subphylum: Chelicerata
- Class: Arachnida
- Order: Araneae
- Infraorder: Araneomorphae
- Family: Thomisidae
- Genus: Simorcus; Simon

Type species
- Simorcus capensis

Species
- 13, see text
- blue: reported countries (WSC)

= Simorcus =

Genus of spiders

Simorcus is a genus of spiders in the family Thomisidae. It was first described in 1895 by Eugène Simon. All except one of the thirteen species are found in Africa.

== Distribution ==
Species in this genus are mostly found in West, East and southern Africa. One species reaches into Yemen, with another endemic to China.

== Description ==
Spiders in the genus Simorcus exhibit little sexual dimorphism except for the smaller size of males.

Females measure 3.8–6.0 mm in body size, while males are 3.0–5.8 mm. Live specimens are brown or grey, mottled with white or cream, though color fades in alcohol to yellow-brown.

The carapace is longer than wide, rugose, and covered with numerous tubercles, each bearing short clavate or spiniform setae. The eyes are small and positioned on slightly raised tubercles. The eye region is elevated and decorated with six tubercles, each bearing either a spiniform or clavate seta that could be either short and stout or long and slender.

The abdomen is longer than wide (except in S. capensis) and caudally obtuse, bearing twenty or more large tubercles, each with a short, stout, spiniform or long, slender, clavate seta. Legs are long with numerous setae but without strong spines. Either leg I or II is the longest.

== Life style ==
Little is known about the behaviour of Simorcus. Material has been collected mainly from bark and foliage, although some specimens were captured in pitfall traps and hand-collected from under rocks or on sand dunes.

Their mottled grey and brown bodies camouflage them well, making them difficult to observe. One specimen was observed feeding on a Camponotus ant.

== Species ==
As of October 2025, this genus includes thirteen species:

- Simorcus asiaticus Ono & Song, 1989 – China
- Simorcus capensis Simon, 1895 – Tanzania, South Africa (type species)
- Simorcus coronatus Simon, 1907 – West, Central Africa
- Simorcus cotti Lessert, 1936 – Tanzania, Mozambique, South Africa, Eswatini
- Simorcus cummingae van Niekerk & Dippenaar-Schoeman, 2010 – Botswana, Zimbabwe
- Simorcus guinea van Niekerk & Dippenaar-Schoeman, 2010 – Guinea, DR Congo
- Simorcus haddadi van Niekerk & Dippenaar-Schoeman, 2010 – South Africa
- Simorcus hakos van Niekerk & Dippenaar-Schoeman, 2010 – Namibia
- Simorcus itombwe van Niekerk & Dippenaar-Schoeman, 2010 – Congo
- Simorcus kalemie van Niekerk & Dippenaar-Schoeman, 2010 – Congo
- Simorcus lotzi van Niekerk & Dippenaar-Schoeman, 2010 – Namibia, Botswana, South Africa
- Simorcus okavango van Niekerk & Dippenaar-Schoeman, 2010 – Botswana
- Simorcus vanharteni van Niekerk & Dippenaar-Schoeman, 2010 – Yemen, Tanzania
