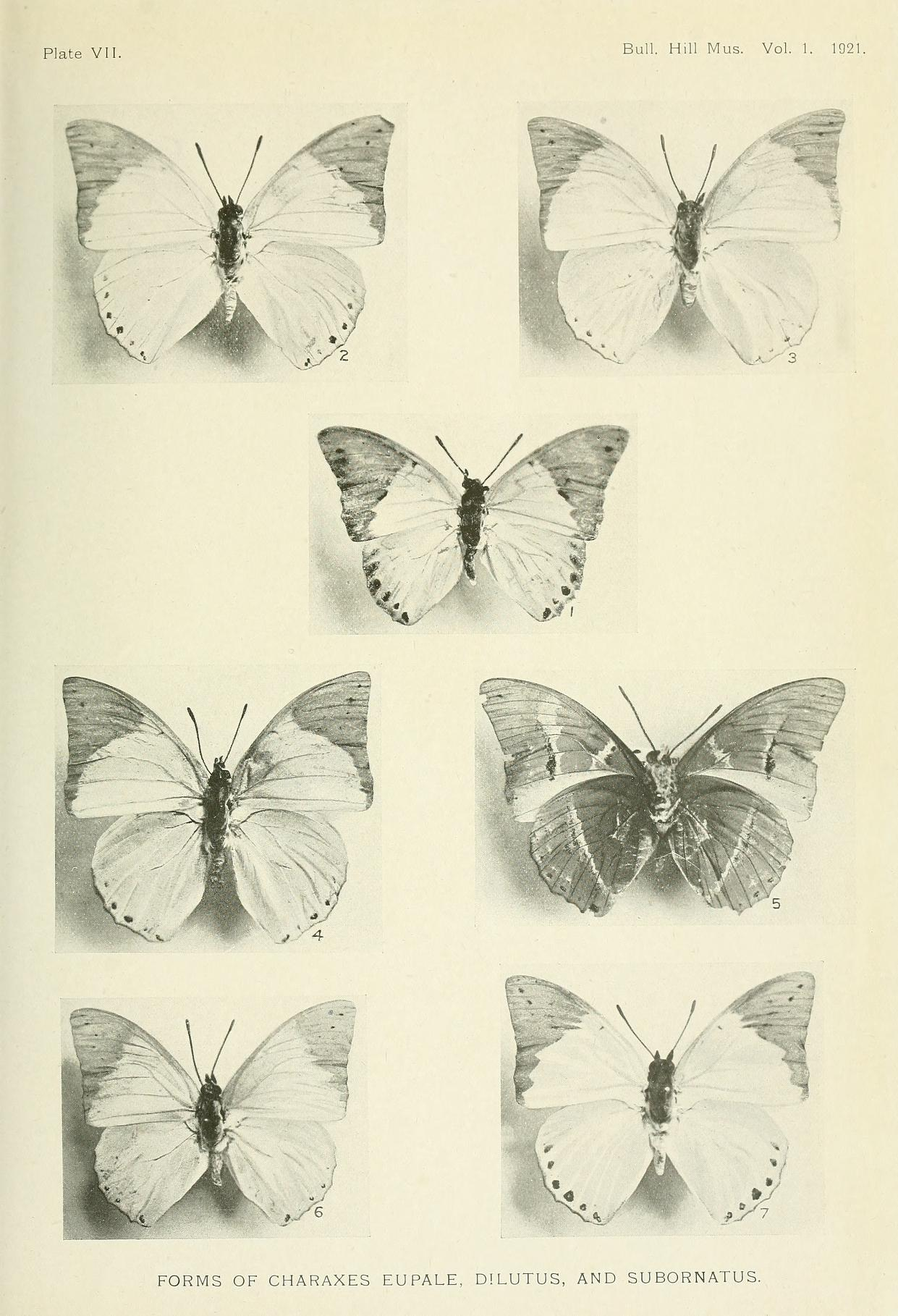

Scientific classification
- Kingdom: Animalia
- Phylum: Arthropoda
- Clade: Pancrustacea
- Class: Insecta
- Order: Lepidoptera
- Family: Nymphalidae
- Genus: Charaxes
- Species: C. dilutus

Binomial name
- Charaxes dilutus Rothschild, 1898

Synonyms
- Charaxes eupalus dilutus Rothschild, 1898; Charaxes dilutus miotoni van Someren, 1975

= Charaxes dilutus =

Species of butterfly

Charaxes dilutus is a butterfly in the family Nymphalidae. It is found in Uganda, Tanzania, Malawi, the Democratic Republic of the Congo, Zambia and Angola. The habitat consists of tropical evergreen forests.

The larvae feed on Albizia gummifera, Albizia adianthifolia and Scutia species.

Notes on the biology of dilutus are given by Kielland, J. (1990).

== Description ==
dilutus Rothsch. is somewhat larger [than Charaxes eupale, with the apical half of the forewing light green, less sharply defined proximally and terminating at or before the end of vein 1. Hindwing without dark marginal line and with the submarginal spots smaller or indistinct. In the interior of the Congo region and in Nyassaland.

A full description is given by Walter Rothschild and Karl Jordan, 1900 Novitates Zoologicae Volume 7:287-524. page 512 (for terms see Novitates Zoologicae Volume 5:545-601 )

== Subspecies ==
- Charaxes dilutus dilutus (Malawi, Zambia, eastern Angola, Democratic Republic of Congo, southern and western Tanzania)
- Charaxes dilutus amanica Collins, 1990 (north-eastern Tanzania)
- Charaxes dilutus kasitu White & Grant, 1989 (Malawi: west-central to the Dzelanyama Range) synonym for Charaxes eupale
- Charaxes dilutus ngonga van Someren, 1974. (central Kenya, Uganda: south-west to Kigezi, Sudan) synonym for Charaxes eupale

== Similar species ==
Charaxes dilutus is in the Charaxes eupale species group (clade). The clade members are

- Charaxes subornatus
- Charaxes eupale
- Charaxes dilutus
- Charaxes montis
- Charaxes minor
- Charaxes schiltzei
- Charaxes schultzei
- Charaxes virescens

Bouyer et al., 2008 erected the genus Viridixes Bouyer & Vingerhoedt, 2008 to accommodate species belonging to the eupale species group.

== Realm ==
Afrotropical realm
