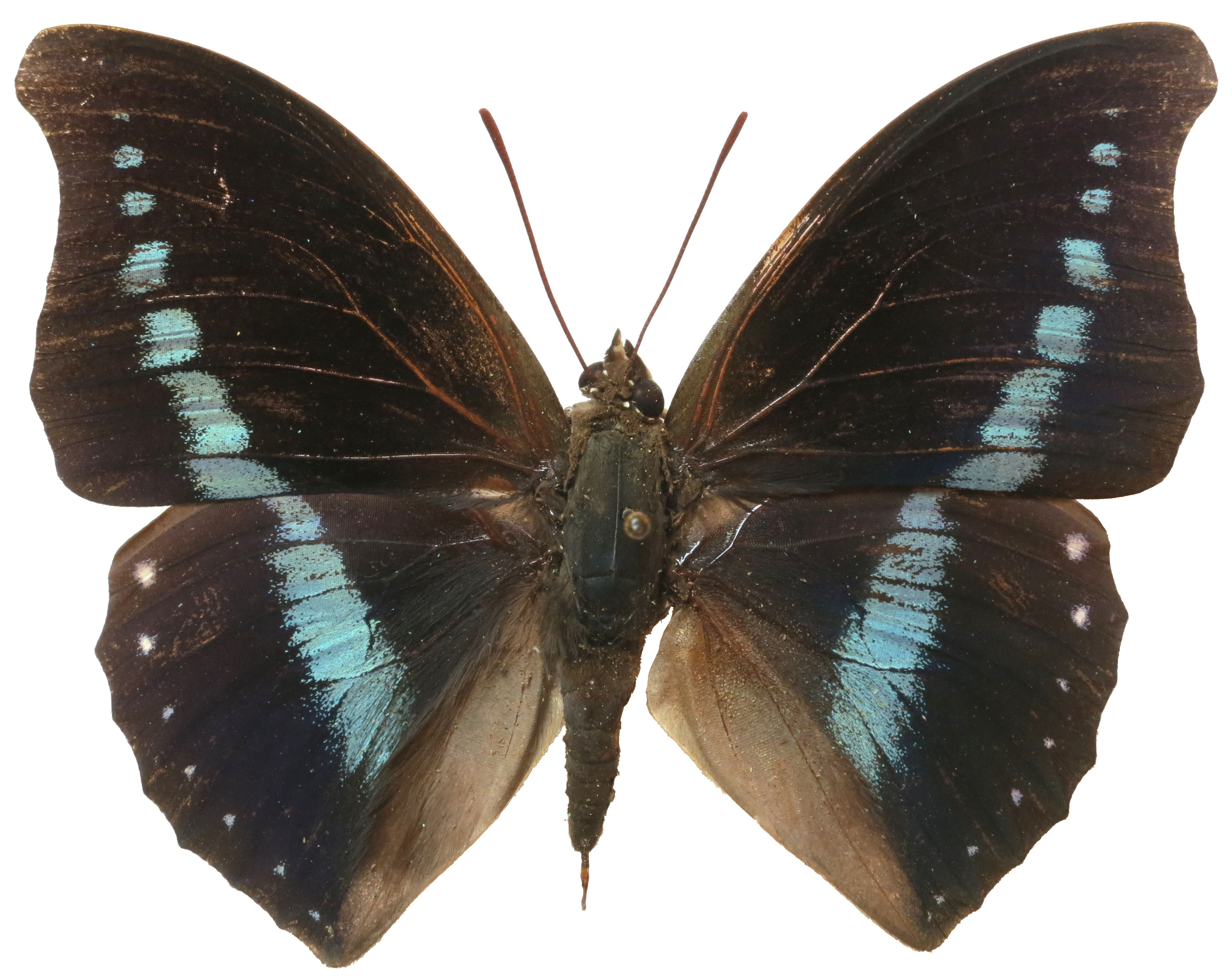
- Charaxes porthos - CAR

Scientific classification
- Kingdom: Animalia
- Phylum: Arthropoda
- Clade: Pancrustacea
- Class: Insecta
- Order: Lepidoptera
- Family: Nymphalidae
- Subfamily: Charaxinae
- Tribe: Charaxini
- Genus: Charaxes
- Species: C. porthos

Binomial name
- Charaxes porthos Grose-Smith, 1883

Synonyms
- Charaxes midas Staudinger, 1891; Charaxes dunkeli Röber, 1939; Charaxes katangae Rousseau-Decelle, 1931

= Charaxes porthos =

Species of butterfly

Charaxes porthos, the Porthos untailed charaxes, is a butterfly in the family Nymphalidae. It is found in Guinea, Sierra Leone, Ivory Coast, Ghana, Nigeria, Cameroon, the Central African Republic, Gabon, the Republic of the Congo, the Democratic Republic of the Congo, Uganda and Tanzania.

== Description ==
Ch. porthos Smith. male Hindwing above with a blue transverse band 4–5 mm. in breadth, placed in the middle and continued on the forewing almost straight to vein 6 or 7, but then becoming gradually narrower and breaking up into spots. female unknown [at that date]. Cameroons to the Congo; very rare.

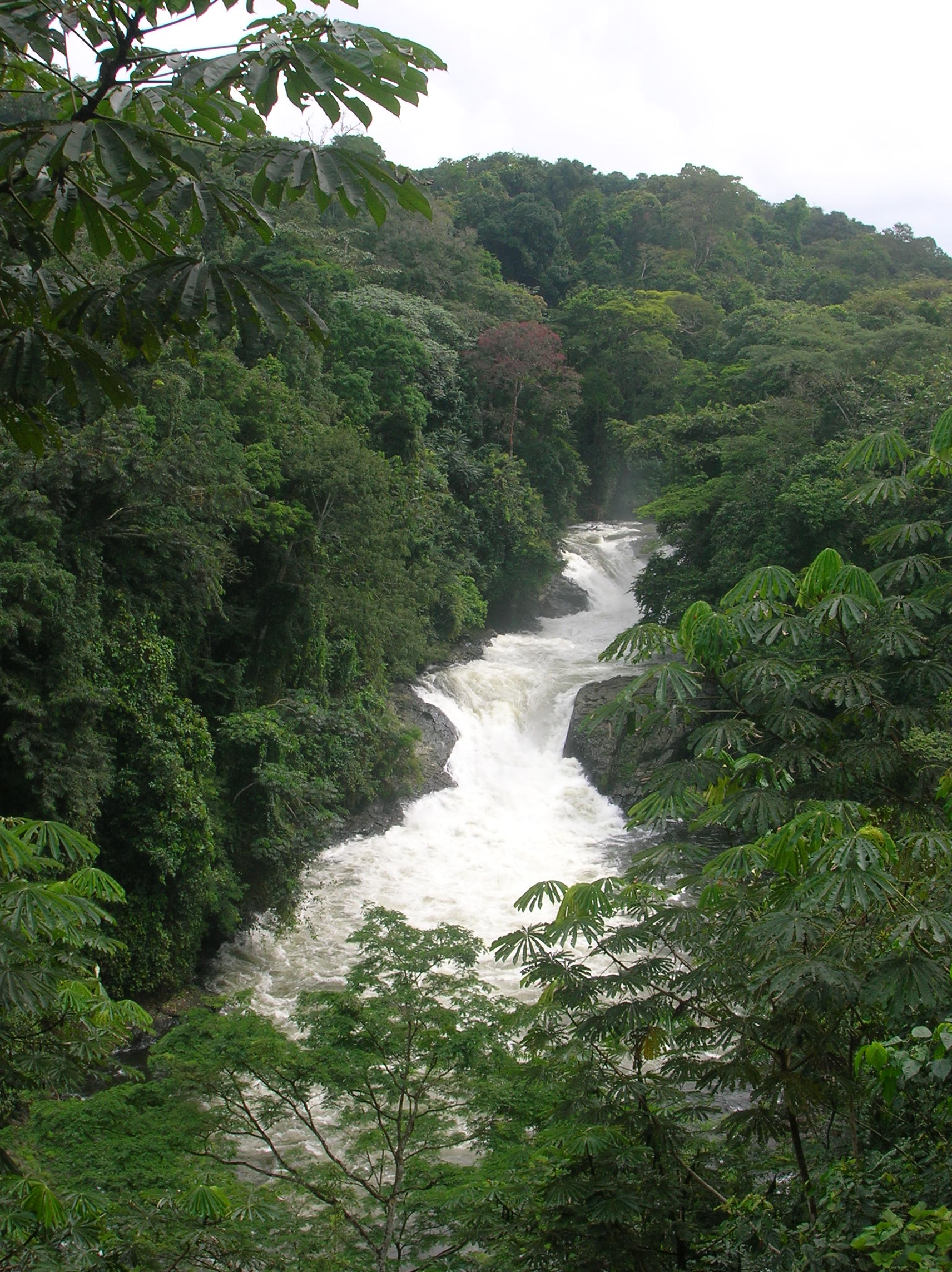
Habitat in Nigeria

== Biology ==
The habitat consists of lowland evergreen forests and drier forests.

Notes on the biology of porthos are given by Congdon and Collins (1998)

== Subspecies ==
- C. p. porthos (eastern Nigeria, Cameroon, Central African Republic, Gabon, Congo, Democratic Republic of the Congo: Ubangi, Mongala, Uele, Tshopo, Kinshasa, Sankuru)
- C. p. dummeri Joicey & Talbot, 1922 (Uganda, north-western Tanzania)
- C. p. gallayi van Someren, 1968 (Guinea, Sierra Leone, Ivory Coast, Ghana, western Nigeria)
- C. p. katangae Rousseau-Decelle, 1931 (Democratic Republic of the Congo: Lualaba)

== Taxonomy ==
Charaxes porthos is a member of the species group Charaxes lycurgus. The supposed clade members are:

Clade 1

- Charaxes lycurgus - nominate
- Charaxes porthos
- Charaxes zelica

Clade 2

- Charaxes mycerina
- Charaxes doubledayi
