= Simorcus haddadi =

Haddad's Simorcus Crab Spider

Scientific classification
- Kingdom: Animalia
- Phylum: Arthropoda
- Subphylum: Chelicerata
- Class: Arachnida
- Order: Araneae
- Infraorder: Araneomorphae
- Family: Thomisidae
- Genus: Simorcus
- Species: S. haddadi

Binomial name
- Simorcus haddadi van Niekerk & Dippenaar-Schoeman, 2010

Species of spider

Simorcus haddadi is a species of spider in the family Thomisidae. It is commonly known as Haddad's Simorcus crab spider and is endemic to the Western Cape province of South Africa.

== Distribution ==
Simorcus haddadi is endemic to South Africa, where it is known only from the Western Cape province.

It has been recorded from various localities in Western Cape including Bergvliet, Brenton-on-Sea, Buffels Bay, Cape of Good Hope Nature Reserve (Olifantsbos near Skaife Centre), De Hoop Nature Reserve (Potberg), Hout Bay, Marloth Nature Reserve, Muizenberg, Sedgefield (Ruigtevlei), top of Kalkbay Mountains, Table Mountain National Park, and Kirstenbosch National Botanical Garden.

== Habitat and ecology ==
Simorcus haddadi has been collected with pitfall traps, Winkler leaf litter traps, and hand-collecting mainly from the Fynbos biome and coastal dune areas, at altitudes ranging from 4 to 692 m.

Adult females were collected in February, April, and June, and males in January, June, and October to December.

== Conservation ==
Simorcus haddadi is listed as Near Threatened. The species is known from twelve locations and is experiencing ongoing loss of its coastal dune habitat to housing development. It is protected in several protected areas including Cape of Good Hope Nature Reserve, De Hoop Nature Reserve, Marloth Nature Reserve, Table Mountain National Park, and Kirstenbosch National Botanical Garden.

== Etymology ==
The species is named after South African arachnologist Charles R. Haddad.

== Taxonomy ==
Simorcus haddadi was described by van Niekerk and Dippenaar-Schoeman in 2010 from Buffels Bay in Western Cape. The species is known from both sexes.
