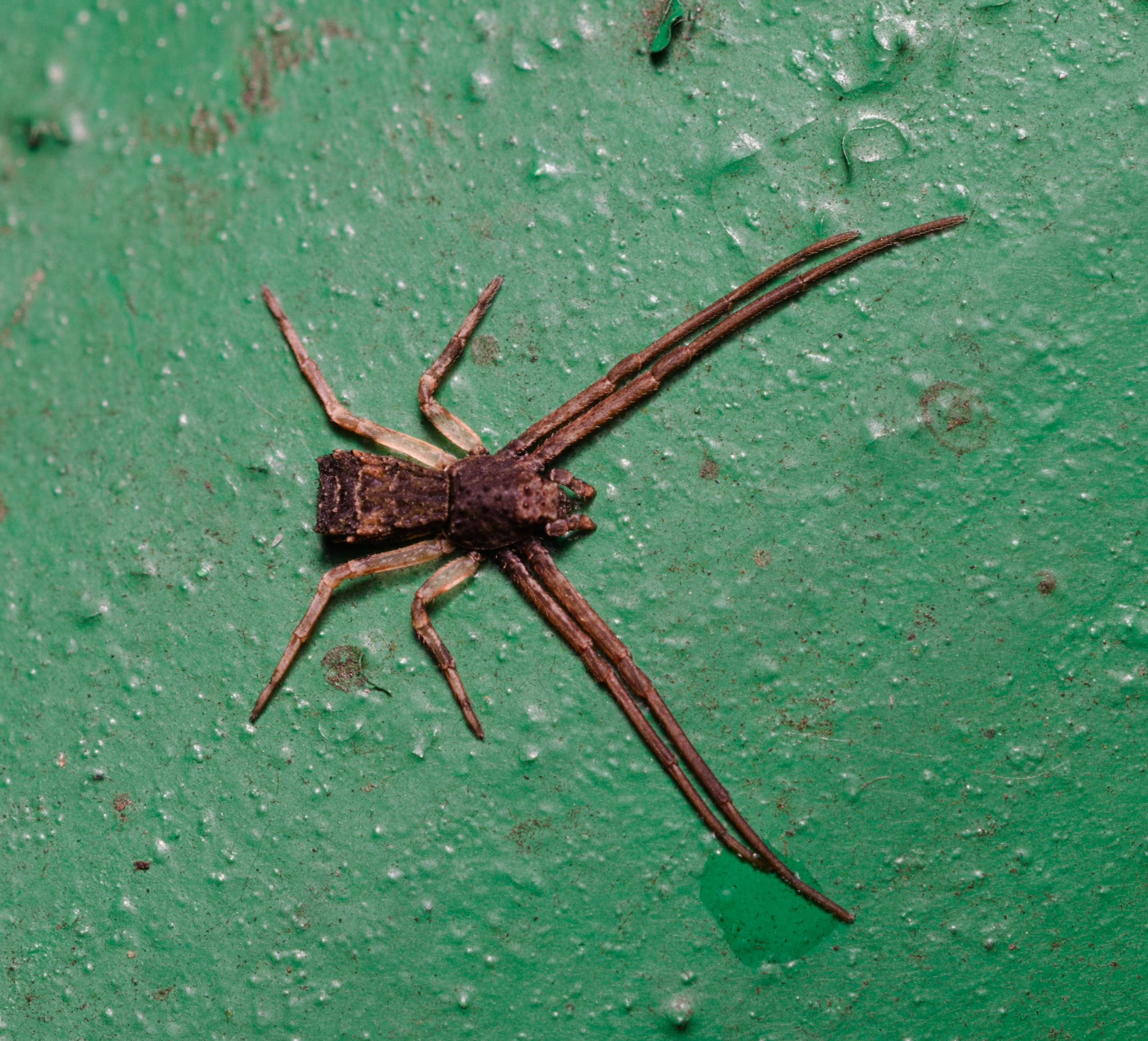
- from Hong Kong

Scientific classification
- Kingdom: Animalia
- Phylum: Arthropoda
- Subphylum: Chelicerata
- Class: Arachnida
- Order: Araneae
- Infraorder: Araneomorphae
- Family: Thomisidae
- Genus: Simorcus
- Species: S. asiaticus

Binomial name
- Simorcus asiaticus Ono & Song, 1989

= Simorcus asiaticus =

Species of spider

Simorcus asiaticus is a species of crab spider in the family Thomisidae. It is found in China.

== Taxonomy ==
Simorcus asiaticus was first described by Hirotsugu Ono and Daxiang Song in 1989, marking the discovery of the genus Simorcus in Asia.

== Distribution ==
S. asiaticus has been recorded from Sanmen County, Zhejiang, China, where the holotype and allotype specimens were collected.

== Description ==
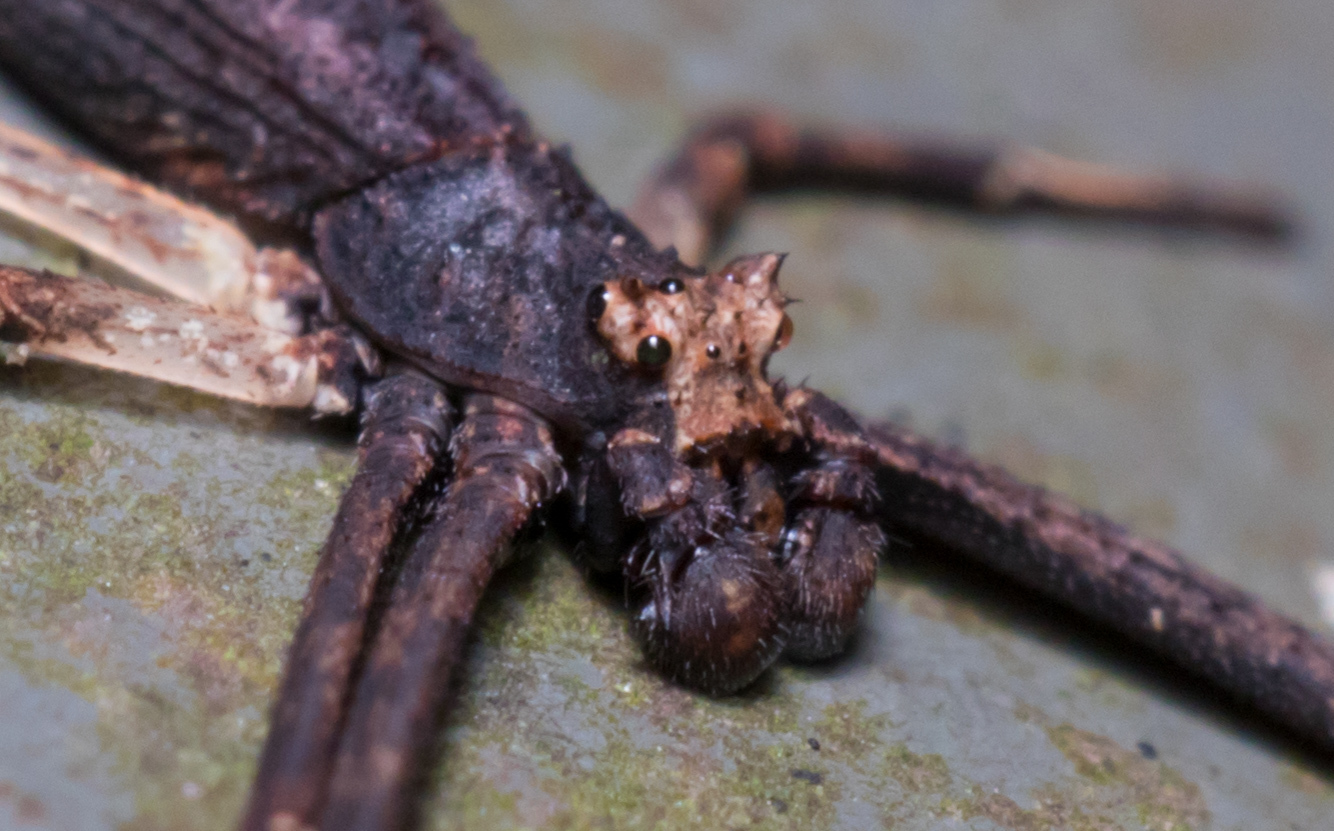
closeup of head region

Like many crab spiders, this species exhibits pronounced sexual dimorphism, with females being notably larger than males. Females measure 7.78 mm in total body length, while males reach 5.28 mm. The cephalothorax is longer than wide in both sexes, with well-developed tubercles and short, blunt setae. The clypeus is exceptionally wide relative to the eye region.

The eye arrangement is characteristic of the family, with the posterior lateral eyes being the largest, followed by the anterior lateral eyes, posterior median eyes, and anterior median eyes being the smallest. The chelicerae are edentate (lacking teeth) and bear strong setae on their dorsal surface. The maxillae are notably elongated and pointed, particularly in females, and feature several blunt setae. The labium is also elongated.

The legs are long and slender, bearing only strong hairs without spines. Claw tufts are absent, and the tarsal claws possess 3-5 teeth. The leg formula is I-II-IV-III, indicating that the first legs are longest and the third legs are shortest.

The male pedipalp features a distinctive structure with both ventral and retrolateral apophyses on the tibia. The ventral apophysis is long and finger-shaped, while the retrolateral one is well-developed with a sclerotized distal tooth. The tarsus bears five strong prolateral spines and includes a paracymbium. The palpal bulb lacks apophyses, with the embolic division winding twice around the tegulum and ending in a long, spiniform embolus.

The female epigyne is sclerotized with long introductory openings. The internal structure includes a soft, curved introductory canal and long, tubular spermathecae.

Females are beige with brown mottling on the cephalothorax, while the chelicerae, maxillae, labium, and sternum are dark brown. The first two pairs of legs and pedipalps are beige with darker ventral surfaces, while legs III-IV are yellowish-brown. The opisthosoma is beige without distinct markings. Males are considerably darker than females.
