= Philenoptera laxiflora =

Scientific classification
- Kingdom: Plantae
- Clade: Tracheophytes
- Clade: Angiosperms
- Clade: Eudicots
- Clade: Rosids
- Order: Fabales
- Family: Fabaceae
- Subfamily: Faboideae
- Clade: Millettioids
- Tribe: Millettieae
- Genus: Philenoptera
- Species: P. laxiflora

Binomial name
- Philenoptera laxiflora (Guill. & Perr.) Roberty

Synonyms
- Dalbergia schimperiana Hochst. ex A.Rich.; Lonchocarpus laxiflorus Guill. & Perr.; Lonchocarpus philenoptera Benth.; Lonchocarpus sophiae Kotschy & Peyr.; Philenoptera heuglinii Pritz.; Philenoptera kotschyana Fenzl, nom. nud.

Species of plant

Philenoptera laxiflora, synonym Lonchocarpus laxiflorus, is a species of legume in the family Fabaceae. The tree grows to 4–8 meters in height, has grey or yellowish bark and compound leaves. New leaves are accompanied by purple flowers on multi-branched panicles. The fruit is a glabrous papery pod, usually containing one seed. Ph. laxiflorus is widely distributed in West Africa, Central Africa, the African Great Lakes, and Northeast Africa. It is found in savanna woodlands and dry forested areas, particularly fringing forest near water courses.

== Human use ==
Ph. laxiflorus is used across its range for traditional medicine. These uses include:

- Benin: A decoction of roots with Cymbopogan schoenanthus and Hymenocardia acidia the leaves of Vitex simplicifolia is used in vapor baths and administered orally to treat mental illness. A decoction of leafy twigs with those of Byrsocarpus coccineus is drunk and used as a lotion to treat dermatitis. The powder of calcined roots is rubbed on the forehead to treat headache.
- Central African Republic: The Lissongo macerate the root to make a drink to treat intestinal worms.
- North Gambia: Used as medication for "women's disorders"
- Kenya: Root infusion used to treat back pain and paralysis
- North Nigeria: Medicine made from leaves used for foot ulcers. Bark and roots used for jaundice and as a tonic. The bark is also used for an anthelmintic.
- Senegal: Bambara practitioners uses the roots to treat leprosy and intestinal disorders.
- Togo: Root bark mixed with that of Stereospermum kunthianum and elephant excrement to fumigate against leprosy or, alternatively, a root concoction mixed with that of young Parkia biglobosa and Vitellaria paradoxa is drunk
- Northern Uganda: In traditional Acholi culture, before a war, an old woman of the chief's clan had to bless the weapons of the warriors by sprinkling them with a branch of Ph. laxiflorus dipped in water and millet flour. In nearby Apac District, water sprinkled with Ph. laxiflorus branches around a home was used to ward off evil spirits.

Other uses of Ph. laxiflorus include applying a lotion with a decoction to the skin to treat venereal disease, constipation in children, skin diseases, sterility (insufficient semen).

== Chemistry and toxicology ==
Skeletal formula of lonchocarpane (R=OMe) or laxiflorane (R=H)

Ph. laxiflorus has been little studied, though many species in the related genus Lonchocarpus contain rotenoids, tannins, flavonoids, and isoflavonoids. One study extracted several new compounds from the bark: two isoflavanes (lonchocarpane and laxiflorane) and two pterocarpanes (philonopterane and 9-O-methyl derivative).

Nothing specific is known about the toxicology of Ph. laxiflorus.
