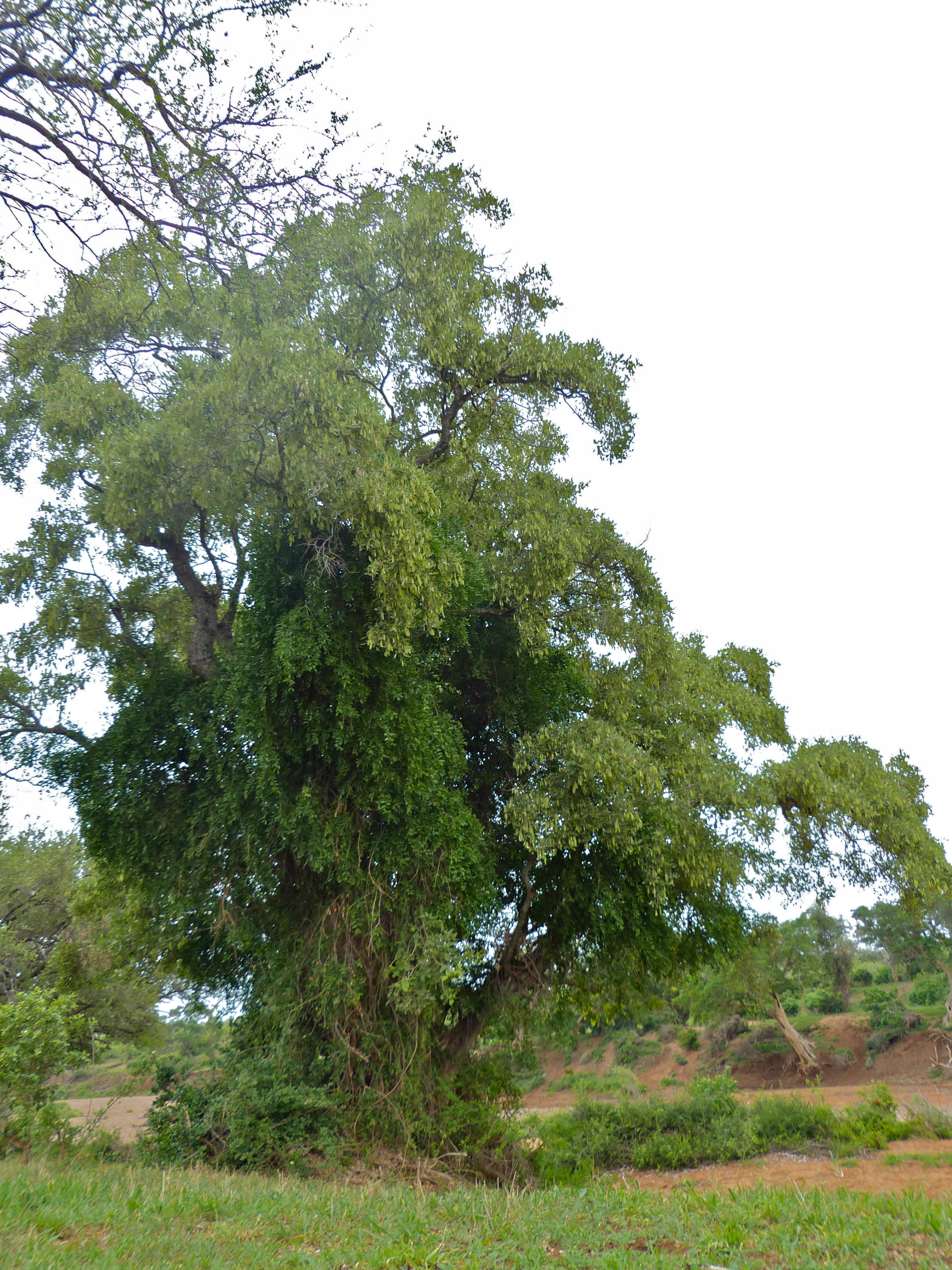
- Habit
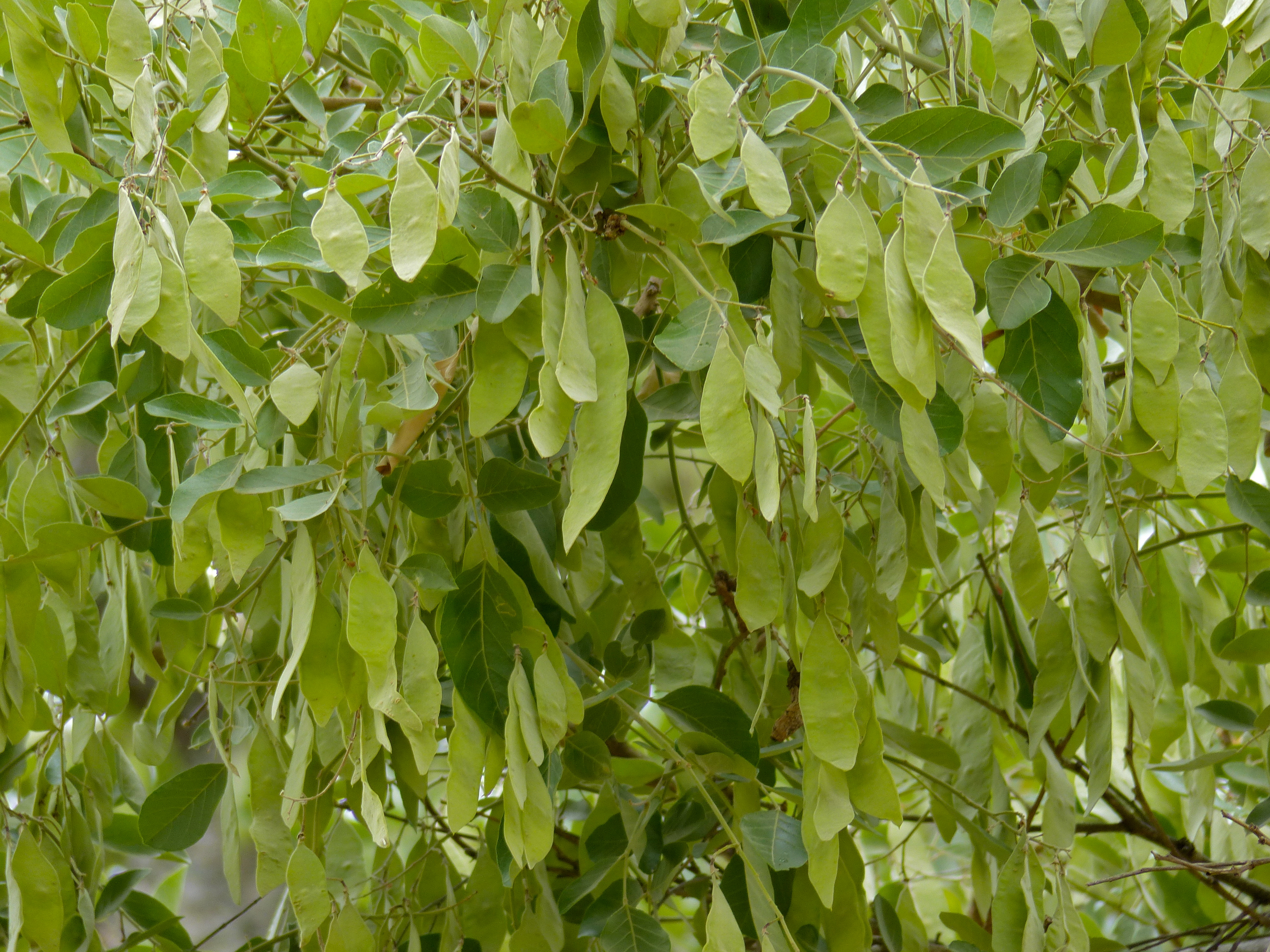
- Fruit

Scientific classification
- Kingdom: Plantae
- Clade: Embryophytes
- Clade: Tracheophytes
- Clade: Angiosperms
- Clade: Eudicots
- Clade: Rosids
- Order: Fabales
- Family: Fabaceae
- Subfamily: Faboideae
- Genus: Philenoptera
- Species: P. violacea

Binomial name
- Philenoptera violacea (Klotzsch) Schrire

Synonyms
- Capassa violacea Klotzsch; Lonchocarpus capassa Rolfe

= Philenoptera violacea =

Species of legume

Philenoptera violacea known also as apple leaf or rain tree, Afrikaans: Appelblaar, Sotho: Mphata, Tsonga: Mohata, Zulu: Isihomohomo, IsiNdebele: Ichithamuzi, Idungamuzi, Iphanda) is a plant species in the legume family (Fabaceae).

== Etymology ==
The name is derived from the drops of water that fall from the tree and collect in pools on the grounds even in dry weather. This phenomenon is caused by spittle bugs (Ptyelus grossus) that infest the tree and suck the sap. After extracting sugar and salts from the sap, the almost pure water is excreted by the bugs to form the "rain".

== Taxonomy ==
The rain tree was collected and depicted as Capassa violacea by Johann Klotzsch in 1861 on a field trip to Mozambique. In 2000, it was renamed as Philenoptera violacea. Homotypic synonyms include Lonchocarpus violaceus by Daniel Olivier, 1872 and Derris violacea by Hermann Harms, 1902.

== Description ==
It is a medium sized tree with a sparse crown and the trunk and main branches are usually crooked. Leaves are compound with 1-2 pairs of lateral leaflets and a single terminal leaflet. The older leaves usually have a rough texture and are blue-green in colour. The bark is pale and flakes in large irregular discs.

== Habitat ==
The rain tree is native to South Tropical & South Africa. It is common in riverine and floodplain grasslands, and in plateau miombo woodlands. It grows on alluvium and Kalahari sands. It is found at elevations of up to 1,400 m (4,600 ft). The rain tree is often grows on termite mounds.

== Distribution ==
It is found in the DRC (Katanga), Tanzania, Zambia, NE Namibia, Zimbabwe, South Africa (Limpopo, Mpumalanga and KwaZulu-Natal Provinces), Eswatini and Okavango Delta, Botswana and SE Angola, .

== Status ==
It is a protected tree in South Africa.
