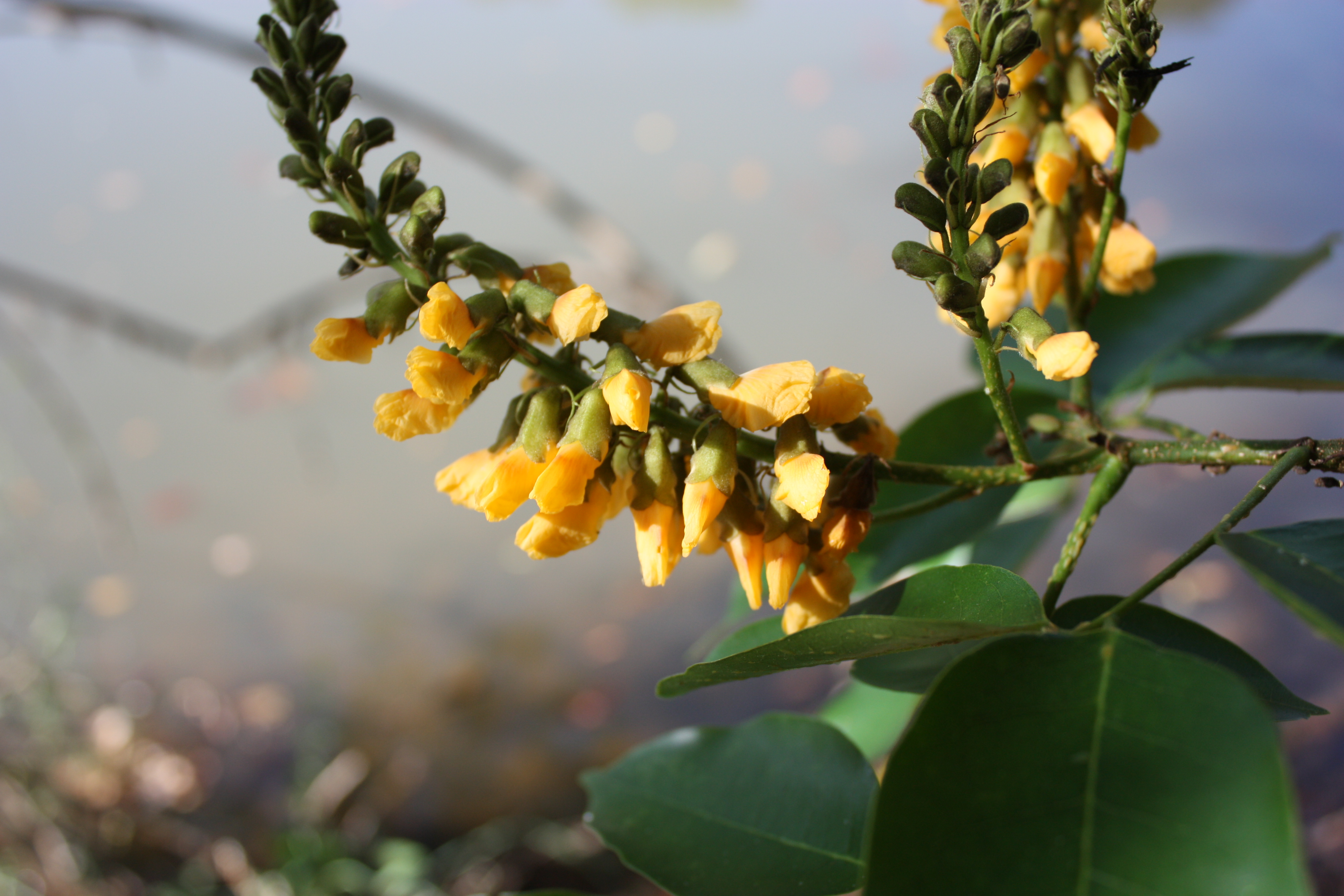
- Pterocarpus santalinoides inflorescences, Comoé-Léraba reserve, Burkina Faso

Conservation status
- Least Concern (IUCN 3.1)

Scientific classification
- Kingdom: Plantae
- Clade: Tracheophytes
- Clade: Angiosperms
- Clade: Eudicots
- Clade: Rosids
- Order: Fabales
- Family: Fabaceae
- Subfamily: Faboideae
- Genus: Pterocarpus
- Species: P. santalinoides

Binomial name
- Pterocarpus santalinoides DC.

Synonyms
- Lingoum esculentum (Schum. & Thonn.) Kuntze; Pterocarpus amazonicus Huber; Pterocarpus esculentus Schum. & Thonn. Pterocarpus grandis Cowan; Pterocarpus michelii Cowan

= Pterocarpus santalinoides =

Species of legume

Pterocarpus santalinoides is a tree species in the legume family (biology) (Fabaceae); it is locally known as mututi.

It has a remarkable bi-continental distribution, native to tropical western Africa (Benin, Burkina Faso, Cameroon, Gambia, Ghana, Guinea, Guinea-Bissau, Ivory Coast, Liberia, Mali, Nigeria, Senegal, Sierra Leone, Togo) and also to South America (Brazil, Colombia, French Guiana, Guyana, Paraguay, Peru, Suriname, Trinidad and Tobago, and Venezuela).

It grows to 9–12 m tall, with a trunk up to 1 m in diameter and flaky bark. The leaves are pinnate, 10–20 cm long, with 5–9 leaflets. The flowers are orange-yellow, produced in panicles. The fruit is a pod 3.5–6 cm long, with a wing extending three-quarters around the margin.
