= Philenoptera cyanescens =

Scientific classification
- Kingdom: Plantae
- Clade: Tracheophytes
- Clade: Angiosperms
- Clade: Eudicots
- Clade: Rosids
- Order: Fabales
- Family: Fabaceae
- Subfamily: Faboideae
- Genus: Philenoptera
- Species: P. cyanescens

Binomial name
- Philenoptera cyanescens (Schumach. & Thonn.) Roberty

Synonyms
- Lonchocarpus cyanescens (Schumach. & Thonn.) Benth.; Robinia cyanescens Schumach. & Thonn.

Species of legume

Philenoptera cyanescens is a species of shrub from family Fabaceae. It is commonly known as elu in Yoruba, anunu by Igbo people as talaki in Hausa, sauru in Tiv and as ebelu by the Edo people

It is a traditional source of indigo in West Africa to dye fabric.
