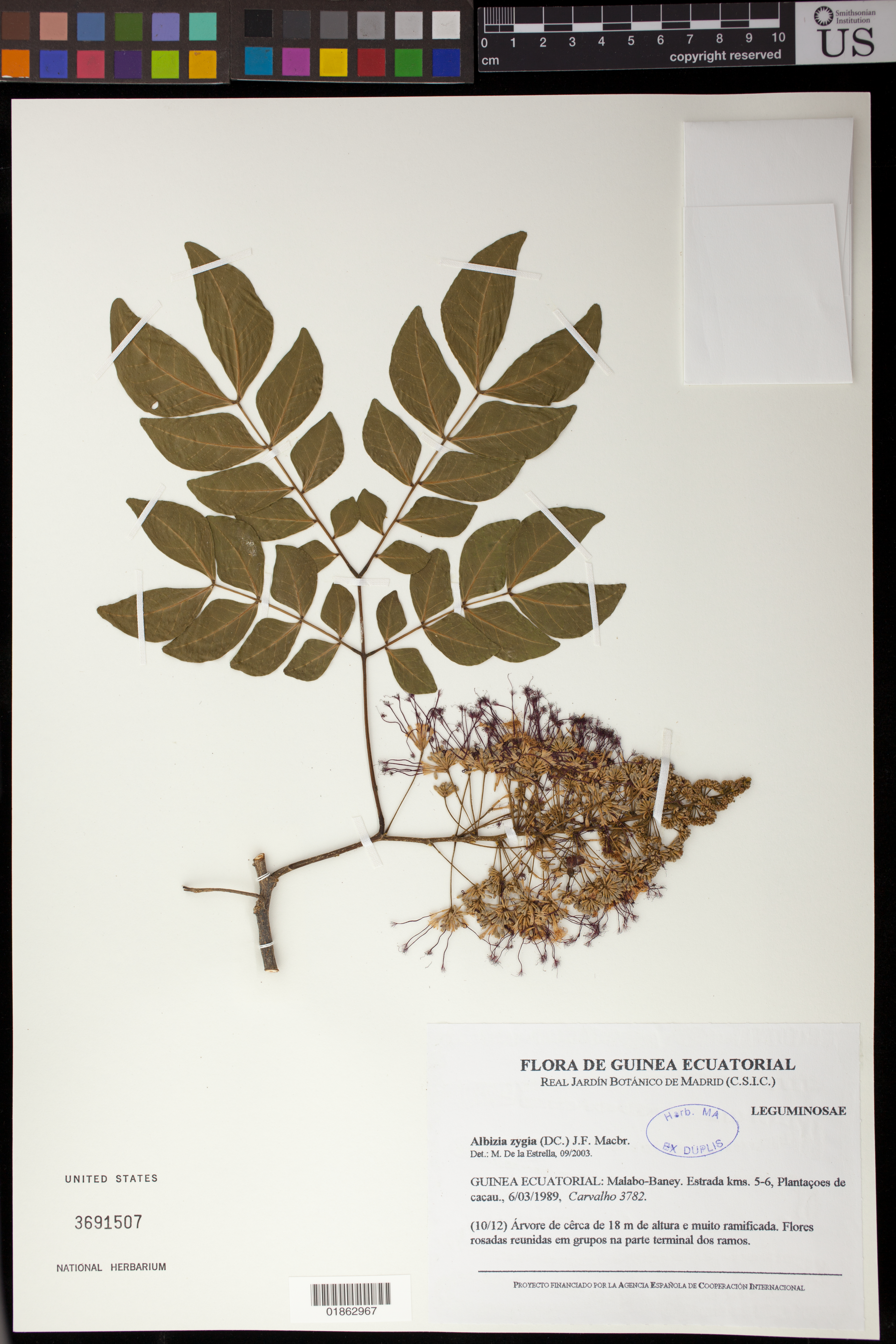

Scientific classification
- Kingdom: Plantae
- Clade: Tracheophytes
- Clade: Angiosperms
- Clade: Eudicots
- Clade: Rosids
- Order: Fabales
- Family: Fabaceae
- Subfamily: Caesalpinioideae
- Clade: Mimosoid clade
- Genus: Albizia
- Species: A. zygia

Binomial name
- Albizia zygia J.F.Macbr.

Synonyms
- Acacia zygia (DC.) Baill.; Feuilleea zygia (DC.) Kuntze; Inga zygia DC.; Albizia brownei (Walp.) Oliv.; Albizia letestui Pellegr.; Albizia welwitschioides Schweinf. ex Baker f.; Zygia brownei Walp.

= Albizia zygia =

Species of tree

Albizia zygia is a fast growing medium-sized tree species within the Fabaceae family that is commonly found in West and Central Africa.

== Description ==
The species grows up to 30 meters tall. Its branches are ascending and wide spreading forming an open crown, the bark is greyish and fairly smooth. Leaves are pinnately compound, leaflets are obovate in shape, with the terminal pairs usually the largest. Flowers are often white to reddish and its fruits are papery and brownish black pods, up to 20 cm long and 3.5 cm wide, seeds are usually produced when plant reaches maturity, and are darkish brown.

== Distribution and habitat ==
The species is commonly found largely in secondary high forest and semi-deciduous forest zones but it also occurs in primary forest and savannahs of West and Central Africa.

== Uses ==
The plant is used as a shade tree by cocoa farmers. Leaves are boiled, dried and used to prepare vegetable soup.

In Ghana its leaves are used in traditional medicine for their anti-inflammatory, antipyretic and analgesic effects.
