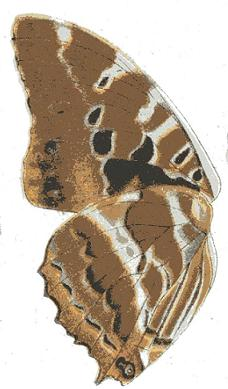
- C. e. mechowi as C. e. eudoxus

Scientific classification
- Kingdom: Animalia
- Phylum: Arthropoda
- Clade: Pancrustacea
- Class: Insecta
- Order: Lepidoptera
- Family: Nymphalidae
- Genus: Charaxes
- Species: C. eudoxus

Binomial name
- Charaxes eudoxus (Drury, 1782)

Synonyms
- Papilio castor var. eudoxus Drury, 1782; Charaxes eudoxus eudoxus f. druceanoides Nicat, 2002; Charaxes eudoxus amaurus f. nzoia van Someren, 1970; Charaxes blachieri Oberthür, 1912; Charaxes eudoxus theresae Le Cerf, 1932

= Charaxes eudoxus =

Species of butterfly

Charaxes eudoxus, the Eudoxus charaxes, is a butterfly in the family Nymphalidae. It is found in Guinea, Sierra Leone, Liberia, Ivory Coast, Ghana, Nigeria, Cameroon, Equatorial Guinea, Gabon, the Republic of the Congo, Angola, the Democratic Republic of the Congo, the Central African Republic, Sudan, Uganda, Rwanda, Burundi, Kenya, Tanzania, Cameroon and Zambia.

== Description ==
Ch. eudoxus differs from the Charaxes druceanus in having the median band on the upperside of the forewing completely bordered on both sides by the deep black-brown ground-colour and towards the costal margin much narrowed but almost straight. The basal third of both wings above is dark red-brown; the red-yellow marginal spots are large and on the hindwing united into a marginal band. On the under surface of the hindwing the silver-white median band is narrow with yellowish spots along the middle and in the basal area the black centres of the silvery streaks and spots are entirely or almost entirely absent. A very rare species. — eudoxus Drury has the median band on the upperside of the forewing rather broad and in cellules 4—7 also composed of rounded spots; on the under surface this band is lighter than the ground-colour and distinctly defined. Pupa unicolorous green, with yellowish spiracles and orange-yellow cremaster. Sierra Leone to Cameroons.— In mechowi Rothsch. the median band of the upper surface is placed very near to the distal margin and in cellules 2—6 is very narrowly linear; on the under surface, except at the hindmargin in cellules 1 a and 1 b, it is red-brown and not lighter than the ground-colour. Angola and the southern Congo region.

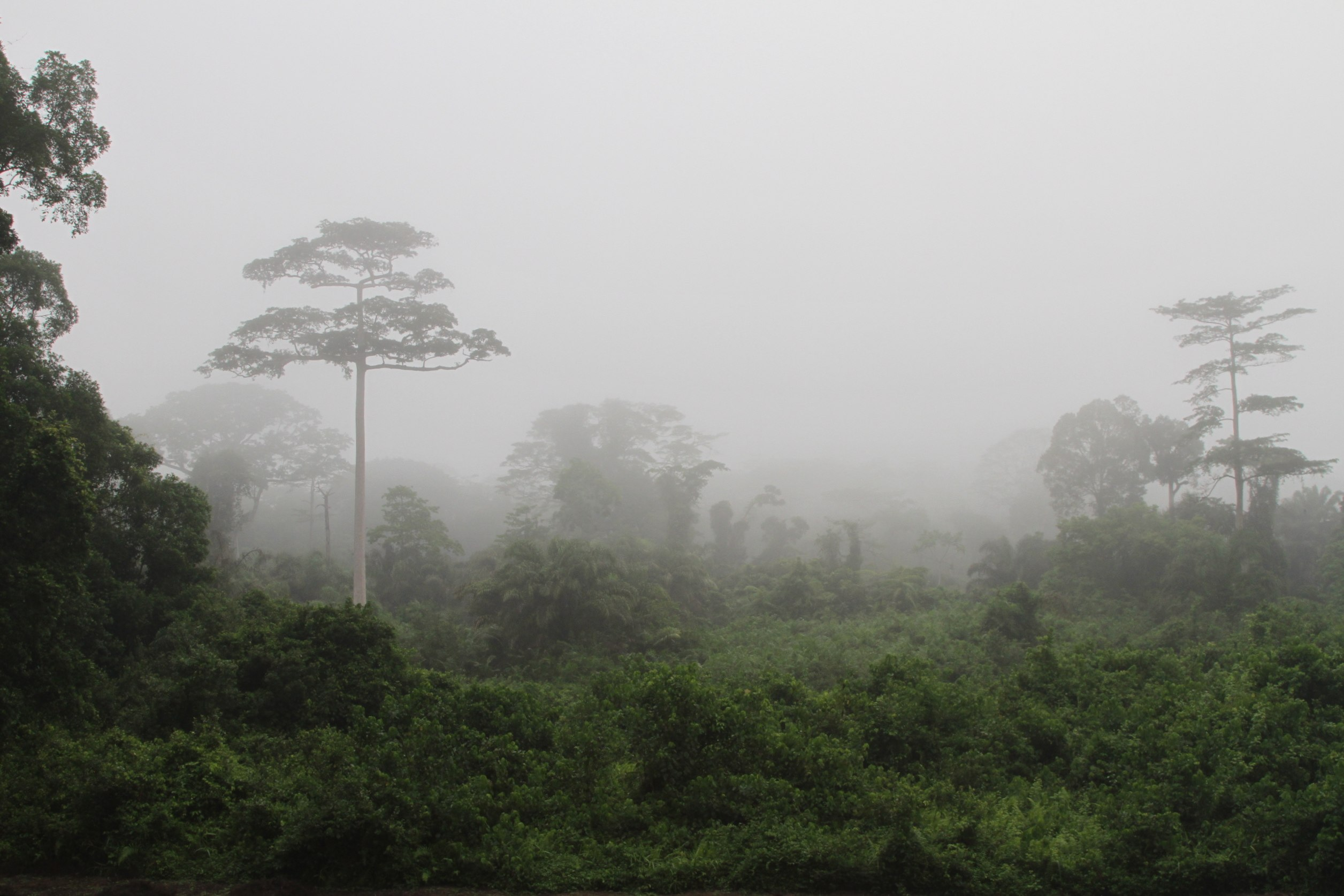
Habitat.Ivory Coast

== Biology ==
The habitat consists of forests, including gallery and riverine forests. The larvae feed on Astropanax, Syzygium (including S. cordatum and S. guineense) and Garcinia species. Notes on the biology of eudoxus are given by Kielland, J. (1990) and Larsen, T.B. (1991)

== Subspecies ==
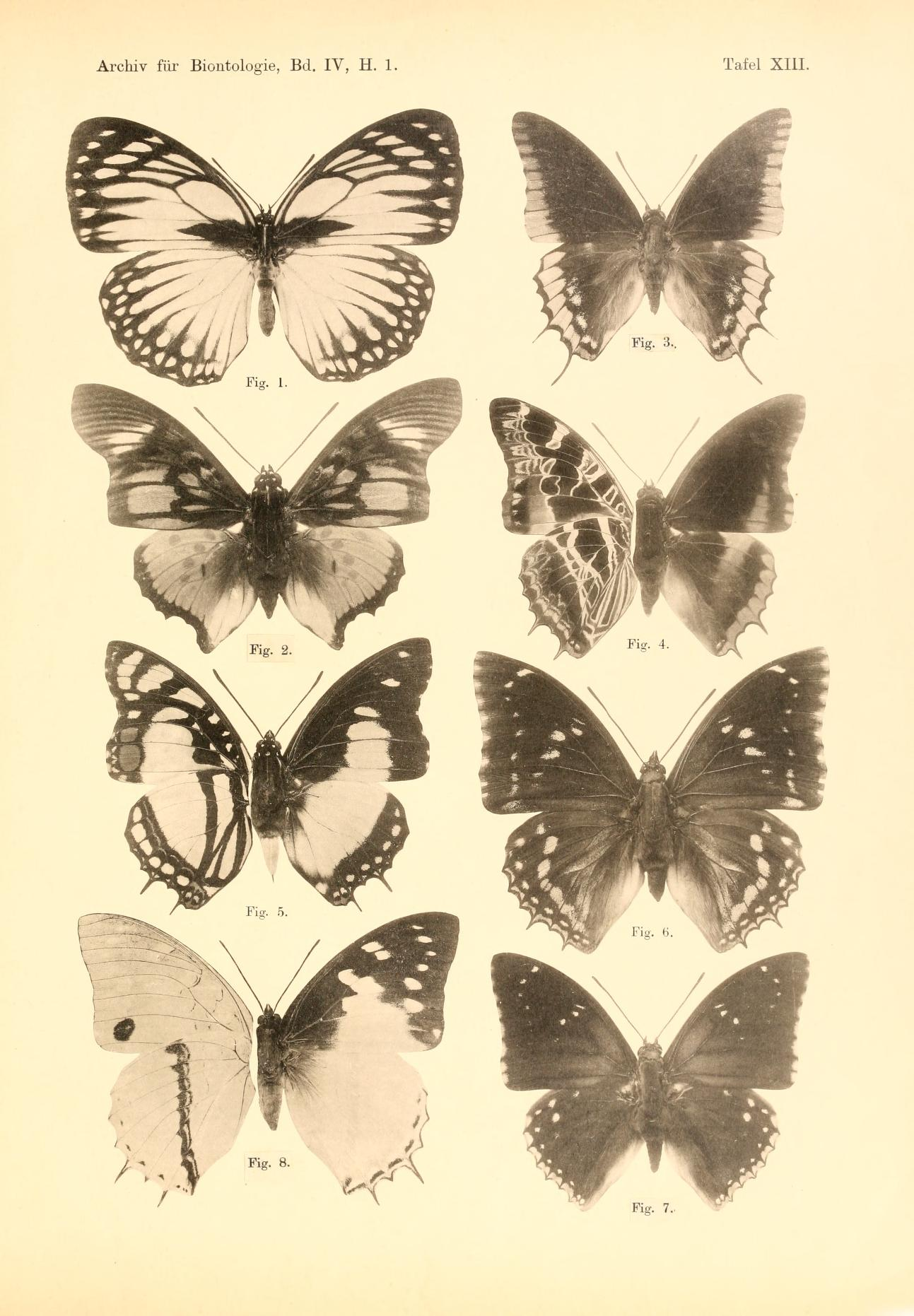
C. e. mechowi figure 4

- C. e. eudoxus (Guinea, Sierra Leone, Liberia, Ivory Coast, Ghana, western Nigeria)
- C. e. amaurus Poulton, 1929 (western Kenya)
- C. e. biokoensis Canu, 1989 (Bioko)
- C. e. boersmana Plantrou, 1980 (Nigeria: north to central)
- C. e. cabacus Jordan, 1925 (Uganda: north-west shores of Lake Victoria)
- C. e. goubandana Nicat, 2002 (Guinea)
- C. e. imatongensis Plantrou, 1982 (Sudan: south to Imatong Mountains)
- C. e. katerae Carpenter, 1937 (Uganda: south to the western shores of Lake Victoria, north-western Tanzania)
- C. e. lequeuxi Plantrou, 1982 (Rwanda, Burundi)
- C. e. mechowi Rothschild, 1900 (eastern Nigeria, south-western Sudan, Uganda, Tanzania, Cameroon, Gabon, Congo, northern Angola, north-western Zambia, Democratic Republic of the Congo, Central African Republic)
- C. e. mitchelli Plantrou & Howarth, 1977 (Zambia)
- C. e. raffaellae Plantrou, 1982 (north-western Tanzania, possibly Burundi)
- C. e. zambiae van Someren, 1970 (Zambia: eastern side of the upper Luangwa Valley)

== Related species ==
Historical attempts to assemble a cluster of presumably related species into a "Charaxes jasius Group" have not been wholly convincing. More recent taxonomic revision, corroborated by phylogenetic research, allow a more rational grouping congruent with cladistic relationships. Within a well-populated clade of 27 related species sharing a common ancestor approximately 16 mya during the Miocene, 26 are now considered together as The jasius Group. One of the two lineages within this clade forms a robust monophyletic group of seven species sharing a common ancestor approximately 2-3 mya, i.e. during the Pliocene, and are considered as the jasius subgroup. The second lineage leads to 19 other species within the Jasius group, which are split into three well-populated subgroups of closely related species.

The jasius Group (26 Species):

Clade 1: jasius subgroup (7 species)

Clade 2: contains the well-populated three additional subgroups (19 species) of the jasius Group: called the brutus, pollux, and eudoxus subgroups.

- the eudoxus subgroup (11 species):
- Charaxes eudoxus
- Charaxes lucyae
- Charaxes richelmanni
- Charaxes musakensis
- Charaxes biokensis[stat.rev.2005]
- Charaxes ducarmei
- Charaxes druceanus
- Charaxes tectonis
- Charaxes phraortes
- Charaxes andranodorus
- Charaxes andrefana[stat.rev.2025]

Further exploration of the phylogenetic relationships amongst existing Charaxes taxa is required to improve clarity.
