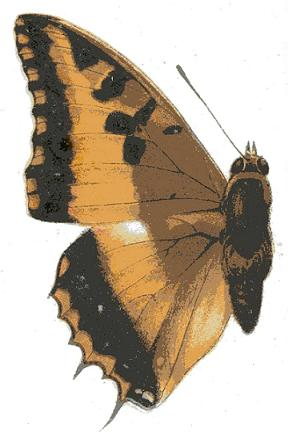

Scientific classification
- Kingdom: Animalia
- Phylum: Arthropoda
- Clade: Pancrustacea
- Class: Insecta
- Order: Lepidoptera
- Family: Nymphalidae
- Genus: Charaxes
- Species: C. druceanus

Binomial name
- Charaxes druceanus Butler, 1869

Synonyms
- Charaxes cinadon Hewitson, 1870; Charaxes druceanus var. obscura Rebel, 1914; Charaxes druceanus kivuanus Jordan, 1925; Charaxes druceanus cryanae Le Cerf, 1932; Charaxes druceanus obscura f. nyungwe Turlin, 1980; Charaxes alicea Stoneham, 1931; Charaxes druceanus proximans f. lugari van Someren, 1939

= Charaxes druceanus =

Silver-barred emperor

Species of butterfly

Charaxes druceanus, the silver-barred emperor or silver-barred charaxes, is a butterfly of the family Nymphalidae. It is found throughout tropical Africa.

== Description ==
The wingspan is 55–70 mm in males and 65–85 mm in females. Ch. druceanus Btlr. is above similar to Charaxes phraortes and Charaxes andranodorus, but has the basal part of the upper surface darker chestnut-brown, so that the median band is sharply defined proximally; the marginal spots of both wings are large and form on the hindwing a continuous band; the hindwing is not tailed at vein 3; the black submarginal band on both wings is considerably narrower than in phraortes and andranodorus. The ground-colour of the under surface is rust-brown and the white markings have a beautiful silver gloss; the black transverse markings in the basal part of the hindwing are much reduced and only represented by fine streaks; as in andranodorus cellules 7 and 8 each have only one black spot or transverse streak, and even this may sometimes be absent; the median band of the hindwing is posteriorly much narrowed and is unicolorous or only in cellules 2—4 with a black streak at its proximal side. Congo, Angola, Nyassaland, Zambesi, Transvaal, Natal.

== Biology ==
Its flight period is year-round. The larvae feed on various Syzygium species (including Syzygium cordatum and Syzygium guineense), Bersama abyssinica, Eugenia species, and Astropanax goetzenii.

Notes on the biology of druceanus are given by Pringle et al (1994)

== Habitat ==
Coastal belt and forest edges up to more than 5,000 m.

== Subspecies ==
Listed alphabetically:

- C. d. brazza Turlin, 1987 (Congo: Kinkala, Bela)
- C. d. druceanus Butler, 1869 (South Africa: KwaZulu-Natal)
- C. d. entabeni van Someren, 1963 (South Africa: Limpopo Province to the Zoutpansberg)
- C. d. katamayu Plantrou, 1982 (Kenya: south to the area east of the Rift Valley)
- C. d. obscura Rebel, 1914 ( western Uganda, Democratic Republic of the Congo, western Rwanda, western Burundi)
- C. d. moerens Jordan, 1936 (South Africa: Limpopo Province and Mpumalanga, Eswatini)
- C. d. praestans Turlin, 1989 (north-eastern Tanzania)
- C. d. proximans Joicey & Talbot, 1922 (Democratic Republic of the Congo, eastern Angola, eastern Rwanda, eastern Burundi, southern and western Tanzania, Malawi, Zambia, north-western Zimbabwe)
- C. d. septentrionalis Lathy, 1926 (eastern Uganda, western Kenya, northern Tanzania)
- C. d. solitaria Henning & Henning, 1992(South Africa: north-east and north-west slopes of the Blouberg)
- C. d. stevensoni van Someren, 1963 (western Mozambique, eastern Zimbabwe)
- C. d. teita van Someren, 1939 (south-eastern Kenya, Tanzania: north to the Arusha-Moshi district)
- C. d. vivianae Plantrou, 1982 (Sudan: south to the Imatong Mountains)
- C. d. williamsi Plantrou, 1982 (Kenya: south-east to Mount Kasigau)

== Taxonomy ==
Curle & Curle describe a hybrid of Charaxes druceanus and Charaxes brutus

== Related species ==
Historical attempts to assemble a cluster of presumably related species into a "Charaxes jasius Group" have not been wholly convincing. More recent taxonomic revision, corroborated by phylogenetic research, allow a more rational grouping congruent with cladistic relationships. Within a well-populated clade of 27 related species sharing a common ancestor approximately 16 mya during the Miocene, 26 are now considered together as The jasius Group. One of the two lineages within this clade forms a robust monophyletic group of seven species sharing a common ancestor approximately 2-3 mya, i.e. during the Pliocene, and are considered as the jasius subgroup. The second lineage leads to 19 other species within the Jasius group, which are split into three well-populated subgroups of closely related species.

The jasius Group (26 Species):

Clade 1: jasius subgroup (7 species)

Clade 2: contains the well-populated three additional subgroups (19 species) of the jasius Group: called the brutus, pollux, and eudoxus subgroups.

- the eudoxus subgroup (11 species):
- Charaxes eudoxus
- Charaxes lucyae
- Charaxes richelmanni
- Charaxes musakensis
- Charaxes biokensis[stat.rev.2005]
- Charaxes ducarmei
- Charaxes druceanus
- Charaxes tectonis
- Charaxes phraortes
- Charaxes andranodorus
- Charaxes andrefana[stat.rev.2025]

Further exploration of the phylogenetic relationships amongst existing Charaxes taxa is required to improve clarity.
