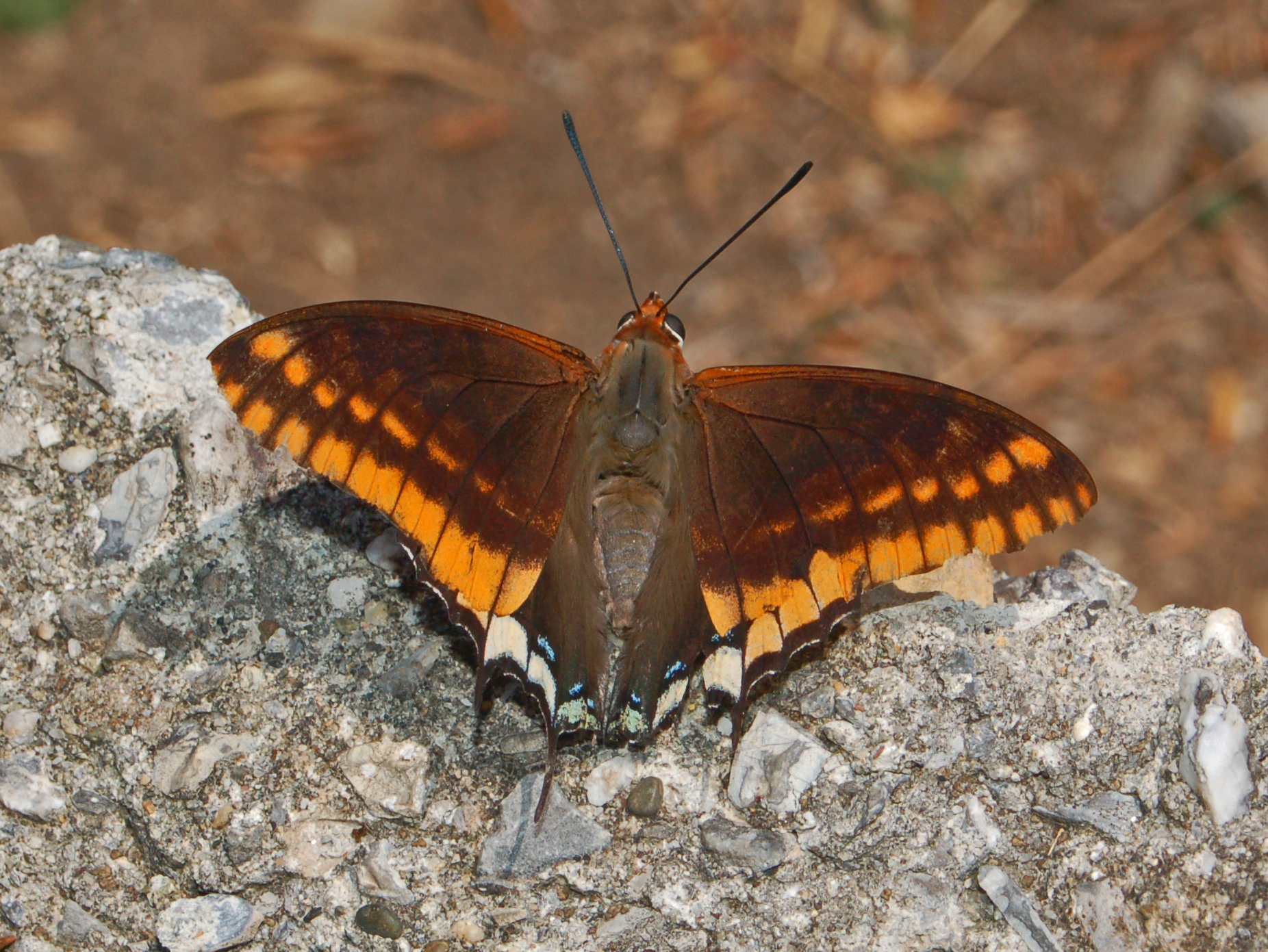
- Genoa, Italy
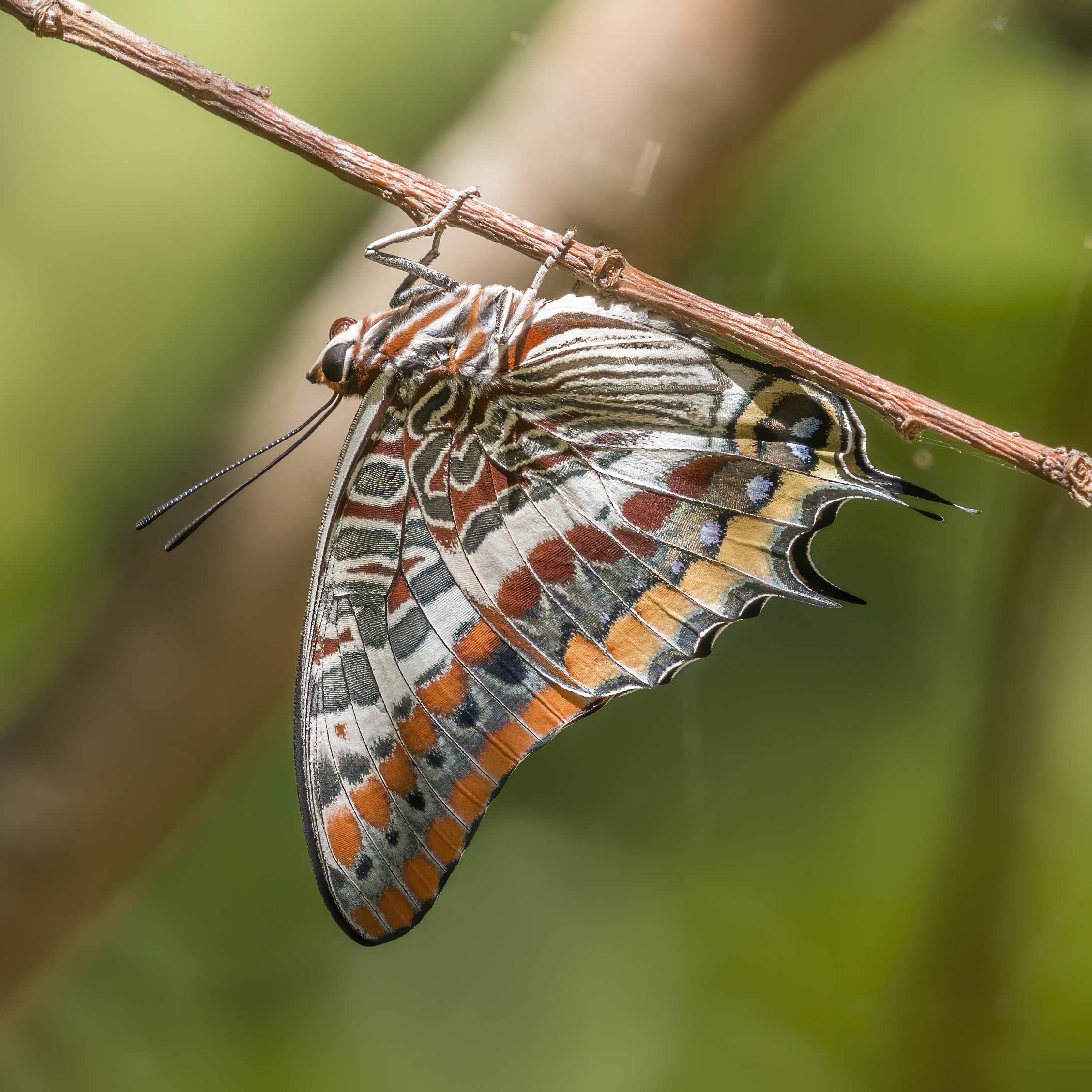
- Sithonia, Greece

Scientific classification
- Kingdom: Animalia
- Phylum: Arthropoda
- Class: Insecta
- Order: Lepidoptera
- Family: Nymphalidae
- Genus: Charaxes
- Species: C. jasius

Binomial name
- Charaxes jasius (Linnaeus, 1767)

Synonyms
- Charaxes jasius subsp. septentrionalis Verity, 1913; Charaxes major Oberthür, 1922; Nymphalis jasius (Linnaeus, 1767); Papilio jasius Linnaeus, 1767; Papilio jason Linnaeus, 1767; Papilio rhea Hübner, 1799

= Charaxes jasius =

Two-tailed pasha

Species of butterfly

Charaxes jasius, the two-tailed pasha, is a butterfly in the family Nymphalidae. It is the only European species of the genus Charaxes. Divergence of the Mediterranean species C. jasius from the last common ancestor with its closest related species still flying in the Afrotropical realm most probably occurred around 2 mya, i.e. during the Pliocene.

== Description ==
Charaxes jasius is a medium to large butterfly with a wingspan reaching 76–83 mm in males, the female being larger. Males up to 80–100 mm wingspan, with females even larger, may be found in Morocco. Each hindwing bears two tails, characteristic of most species of the genus. The spring seasonal brood is smaller in size compared with the second and sometimes third broods, and the two tails on each hindwing tend to curve somewhat towards each other resembling a pincer, less so in the later broods with slightly longer straighter tails. The upperside ground colour of the wings is dark brownish-black, with some changeable purplish sheen viewed at varying angles; forewing with suggestion of darker discal bars, postdiscal spots orange; hindwing with whitish patch near costal border, dusted with brownish scales; outer border of both wings deep orange-ochreous, divided by black-scaled veins. Hindwing with small submarginal blue spots, often vestigial; more developed in the female. There is some variation in the intensity of the ground colour, and in development of the postdiscal orange spots. The underside has a very characteristic mosaic appearance broadly similar to a number of related species, traversed by a jumble of bands and of brown, reddish, greyish and blackish patches, all edged with a filigree of white. Beyond the inner mosaic, a white complete discal band bridges across fore- to hindwings. The outer orange marginal coloration is present on the underside also. The female resembles the male but is larger.

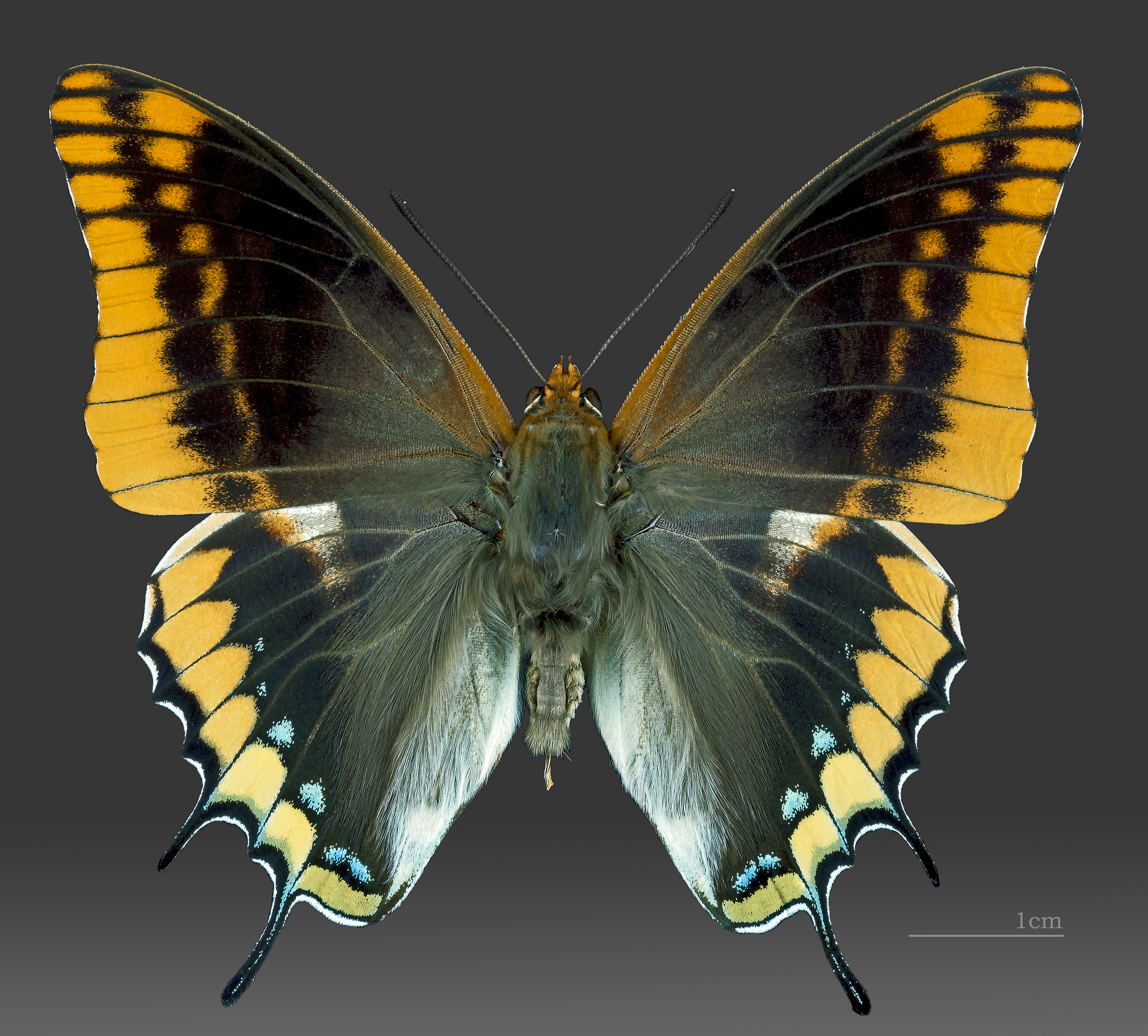
C. jasius. Roquebrun, France. Male Upperside

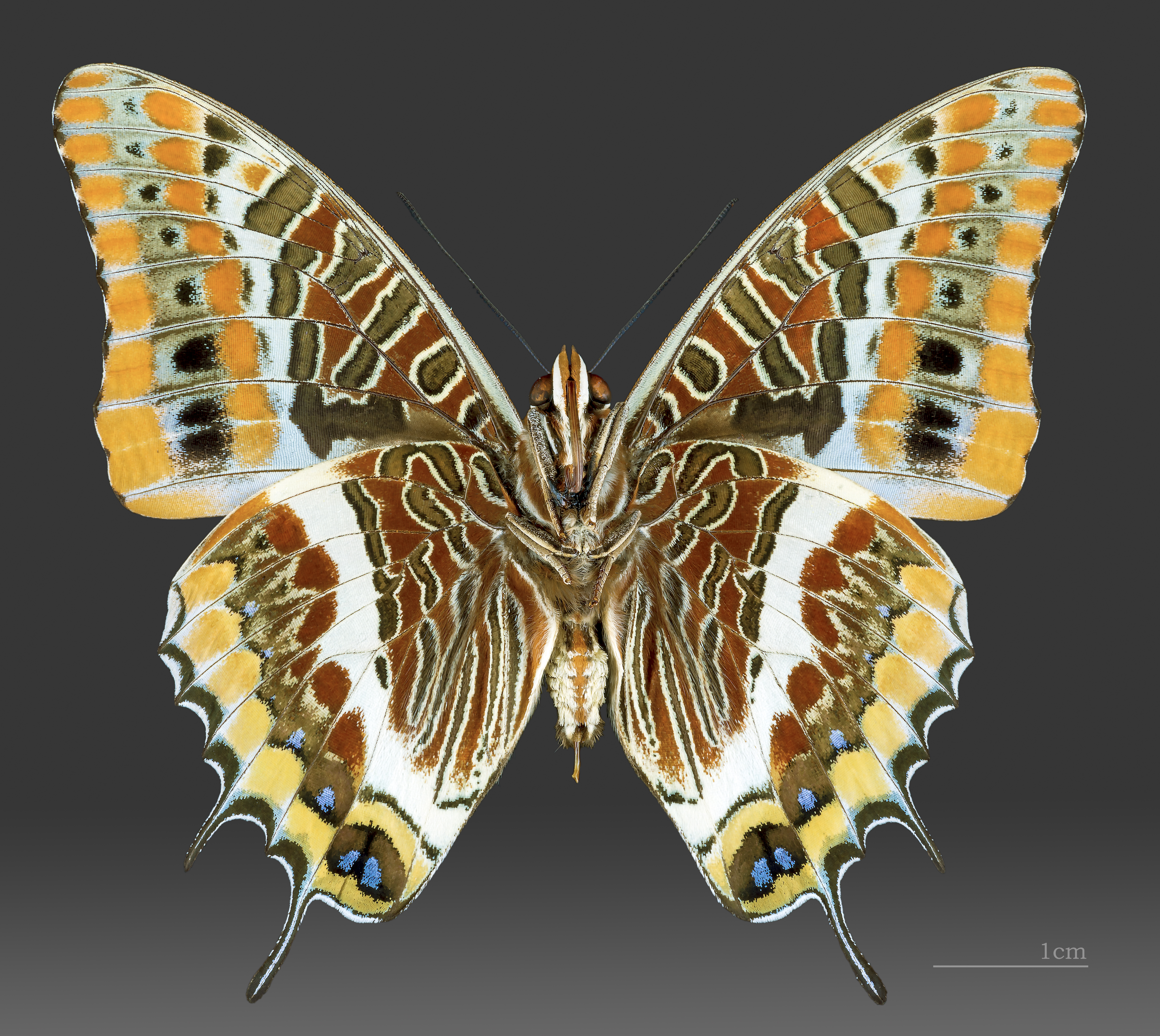
C. jasius. Roquebrun, France. Male Underside

=== Type ===
This butterfly is the type species of the genus Charaxes. The type location is Barbaria, Algeria.

=== Subspecies ===
- C. jasius is a stable species with no currently recognised subspecies. It is found in Southern Europe, the Eastern Mediterranean, and North Africa.

== Related species ==
Historical attempts to assemble a cluster of presumably related species into a "Charaxes jasius Group" have not been wholly convincing. More recent taxonomic revision, corroborated by phylogenetic research, allow a more rational grouping congruent with cladistic relationships. Within a well-populated clade of 27 related species sharing a common ancestor approximately 16 mya during the Miocene, 26 are now considered together as the jasius Group. One of the two lineages forms a robust monophyletic group of seven species sharing a common ancestor approximately 2–3 mya, i.e. during the Pliocene, and are considered as the jasius subgroup. The second lineage leads to 19 other species within the Jasius group, which are split into three well-populated subgroups of closely related species.

The jasius Group (26 Species).

Clade 1: the jasius subgroup (7 species):

- Charaxes jasius
- Charaxes epijasius [stat.rev.2005]
- Charaxes legeri
- Charaxes saturnus [stat.rev.2005]
- Charaxes pelias
- Charaxes castor
- Charaxes hansali

Clade 2: contains the three well-populated additional subgroups (19 species) of the jasius Group:

- the brutus subgroup (4 species):
- Charaxes brutus
- Charaxes antiquus
- Charaxes junius
- Charaxes andara
- the pollux subgroup (4 species):
- Charaxes pollux
- Charaxes phoebus
- Charaxes ansorgei
- Charaxes dowsetti
- the eudoxus subgroup (11 species):
- Charaxes eudoxus
- Charaxes lucyae
- Charaxes richelmanni
- Charaxes musakensis
- Charaxes biokensis[stat.rev.2005]
- Charaxes ducarmei
- Charaxes druceanus
- Charaxes tectonis
- Charaxes phraortes
- Charaxes andranodorus
- Charaxes andrefana[stat.rev.2025]

The 27th species of Clade 2, Charaxes lactetinctus, has shown rapid recent divergence and is treated as a monospecific lactetinctus Group, separated from the jasius Group. Further exploration of the phylogenetic relationships amongst existing Charaxes taxa is required to improve clarity.

== Distribution ==
This species occurs along the European Mediterranean coast from west Portugal to the coastal islands of Greece (except for the northern Adriatic sea coast), from the central and south peninsula of Italy to Istria, and the coastline of southern Anatolia including Samos, Ikaria and Rhodes. Its range includes the Balearic Islands, Corsica, Sardinia, Corfu and Crete. Inland, the butterfly is found in locally in Spain from Huelva and Málaga to Madrid and Salamanca. In France, the butterfly is found isolated inland from Provence to Lozère, Ardèche and Aveyron. Further around the Eastern Mediterranean coast, it occurs in Turkey, Lebanon, Israel, and continues along much of North African coast to the Atlantic Moroccan NW coast as far as coastal Tiznit environs, venturing inland in a very few Moroccan locations as high as 2,400m asl.

== Habitat ==
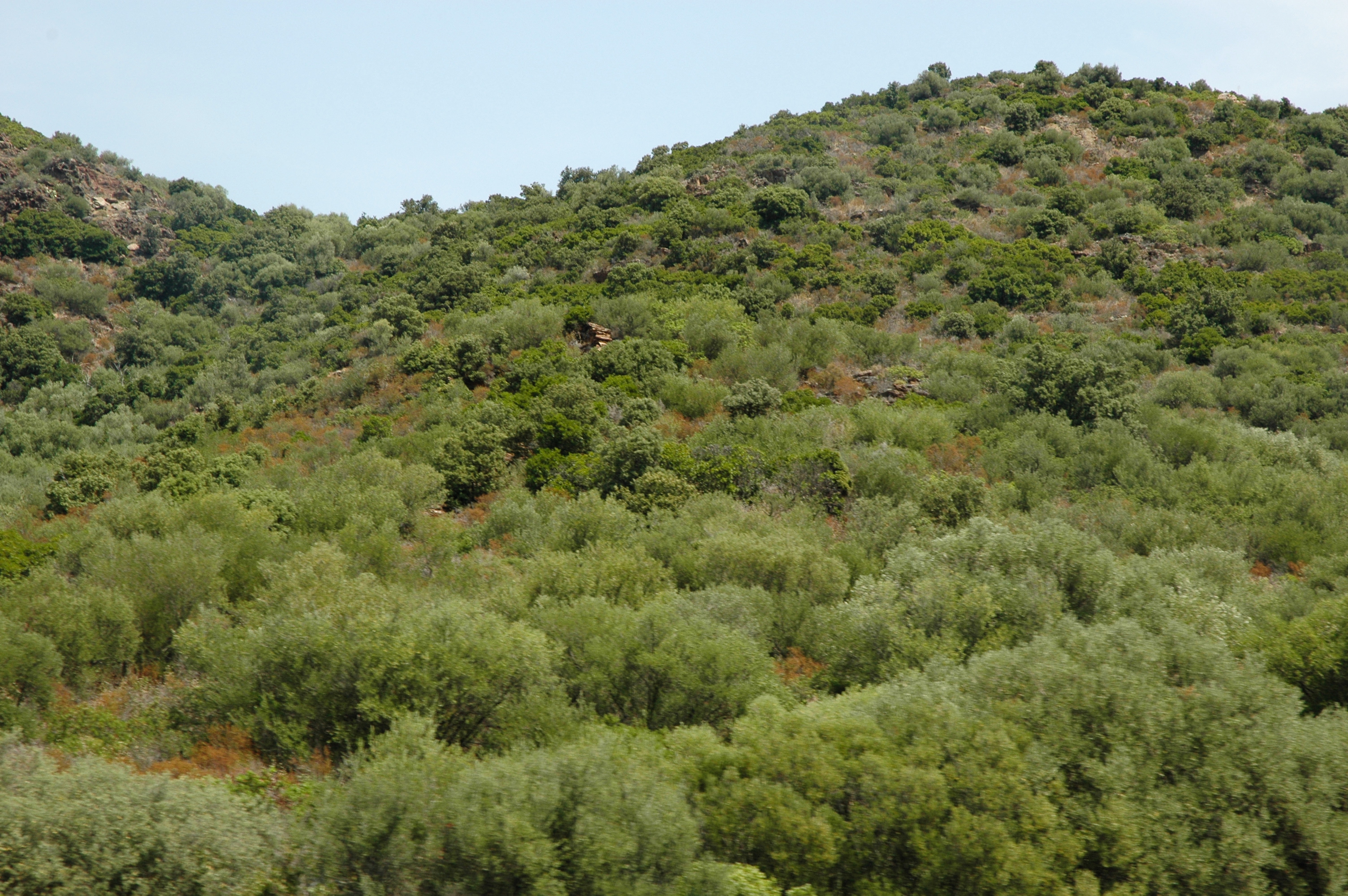
Maquis vegetation in Balagne, Corsica

Its typical habitat around the Mediterranean Basin is the Maquis shrubland, up to 700–800 meters above sea level. This comprises thick, mixed scrub forests, often on hillsides, in hot and dry regions. The butterfly is found wherever its larval host plants are abundantly available.

== Natural history ==
The two-tailed pasha is a fast-flying butterfly that displays territorial behaviour. The butterfly also is a noted for hill-topping. The adults of both sexes are attracted to fermenting fruits; they are attracted to the ethanol contained therein, and can be baited with wine and other alcoholic beverages.

=== Life cycle ===
Charaxes jasius is bivoltine or trivoltine, i.e. it has two or three generations per year depending on latitude and altitude.

Typically, the first batch of eggs are laid in May–June and the second in mid August–mid October. The second batch caterpillars spend the winter in the larval stage, and pupate the next spring. The female lays the eggs on the upper surface of the leaves of the host plant, laying no more than one egg per leaf.

The caterpillar is green, cylindrical and up to 50 millimetres (2.0 in) long. It has rings of yellow-white raised spots on the body, yellow lateral lines along the sides, and two yellow ocelli on the back. The head bears four horns facing backwards. The caterpillar makes a leaf tent from silken threads, to which it returns after feeding on surrounding leaves.

When the caterpillar is fully matured, it hangs on a twig and pupates. The pupa resembles a ripening fruit as it is first green and becomes brown as the imago develops inside. After a period that can range from two weeks to one month, the pupal case opens letting out the adult butterfly.

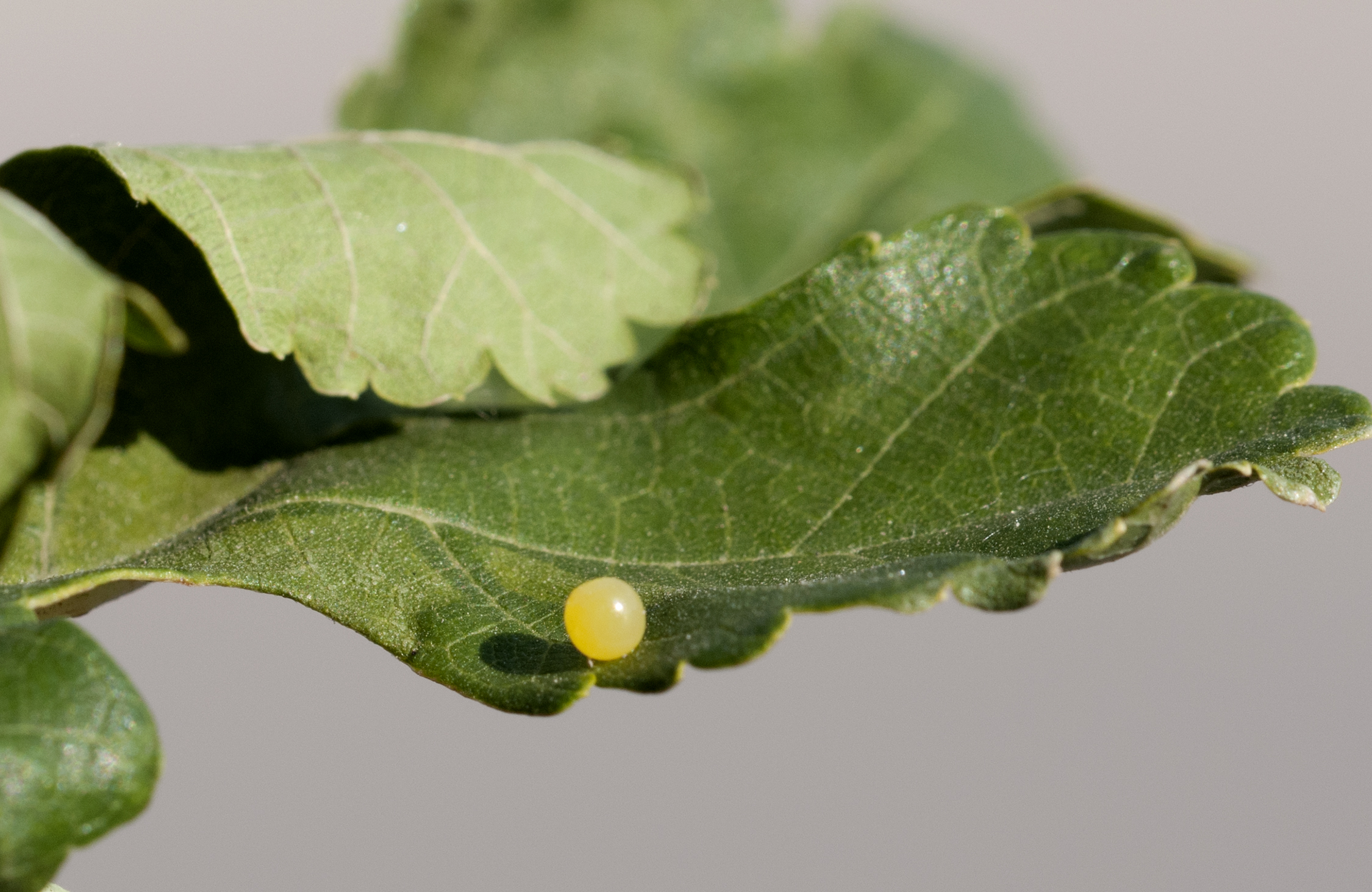
Egg

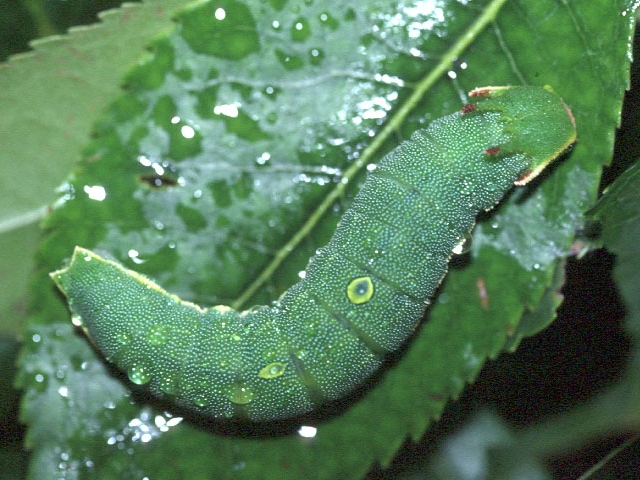
Larva

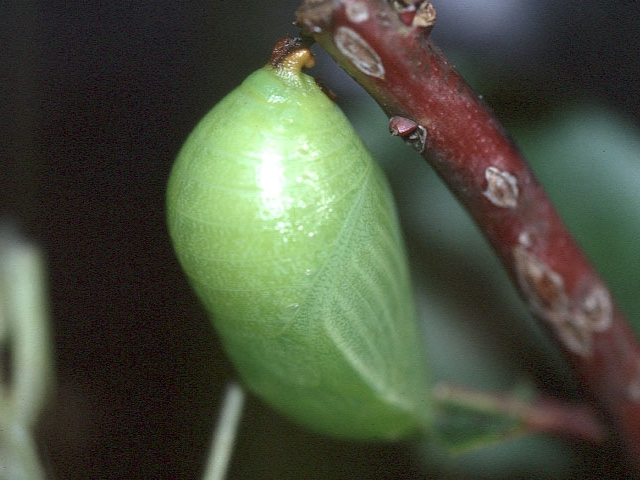
Newly formed pupa

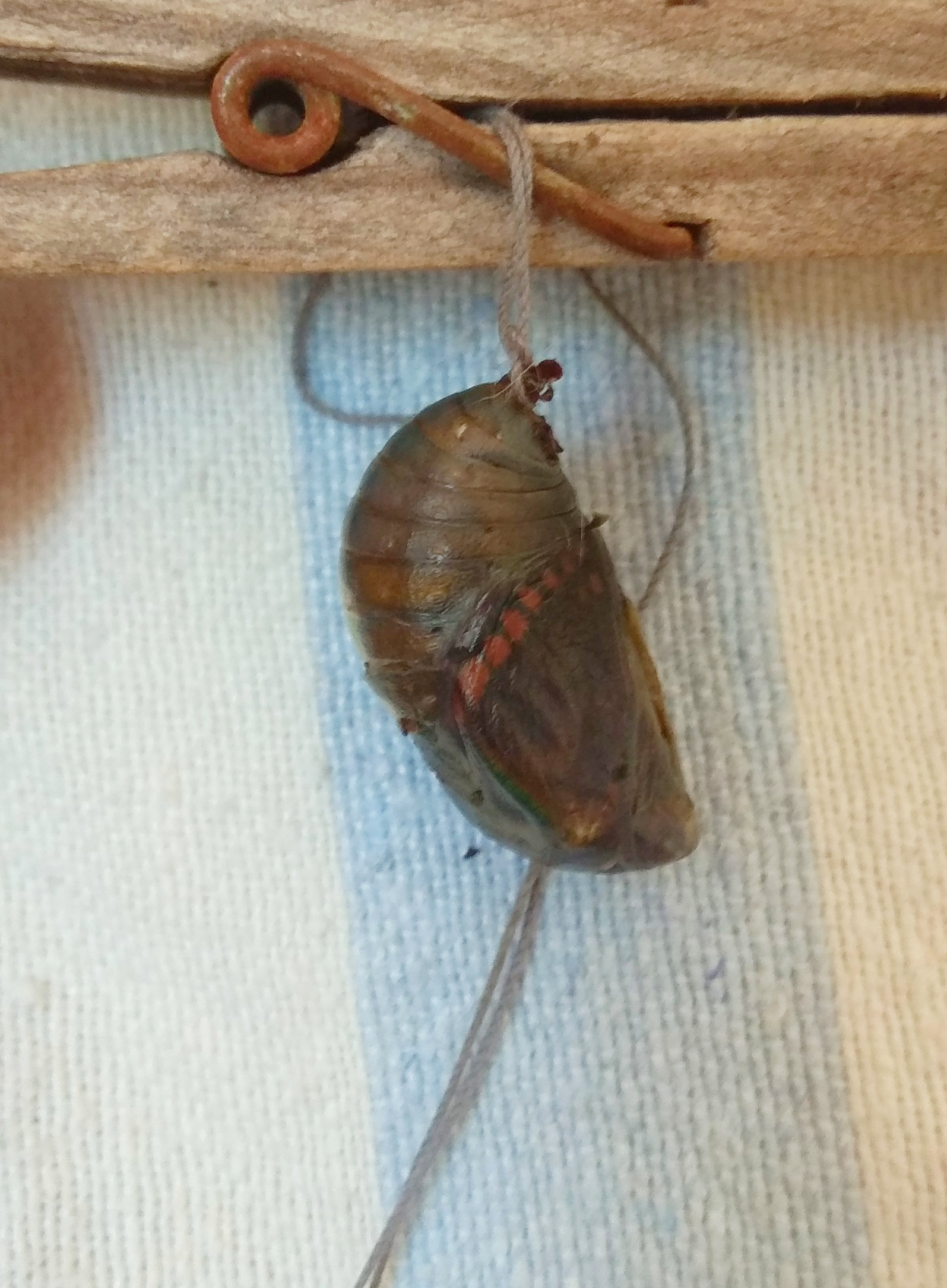
Pupa ready for hatching

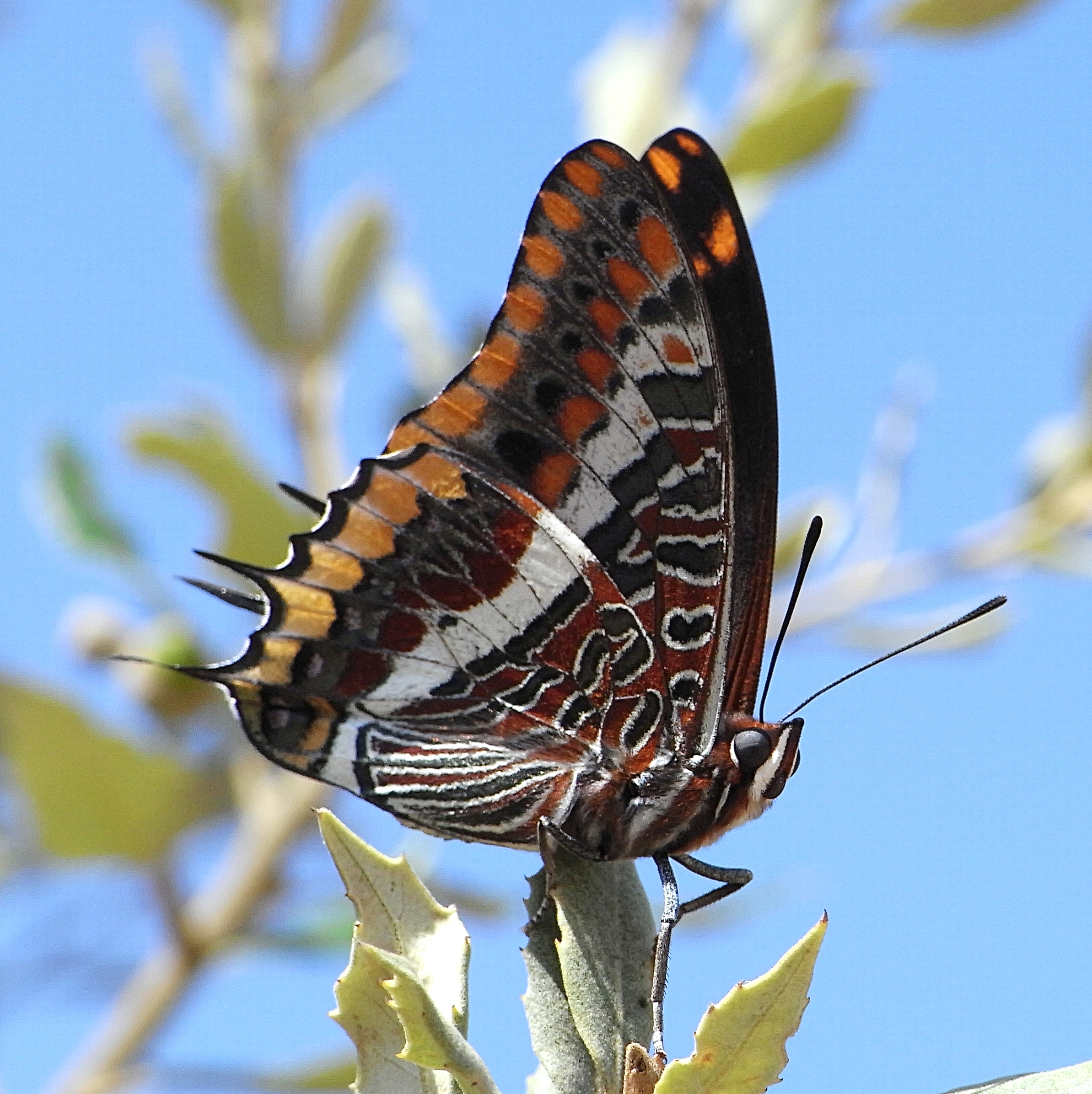
Adult

=== Larval food plants ===
The preferred larval foodplant is the Strawberry Tree (Arbutus unedo), although secondary or perhaps accidental choices are known to include a few Osyris species.

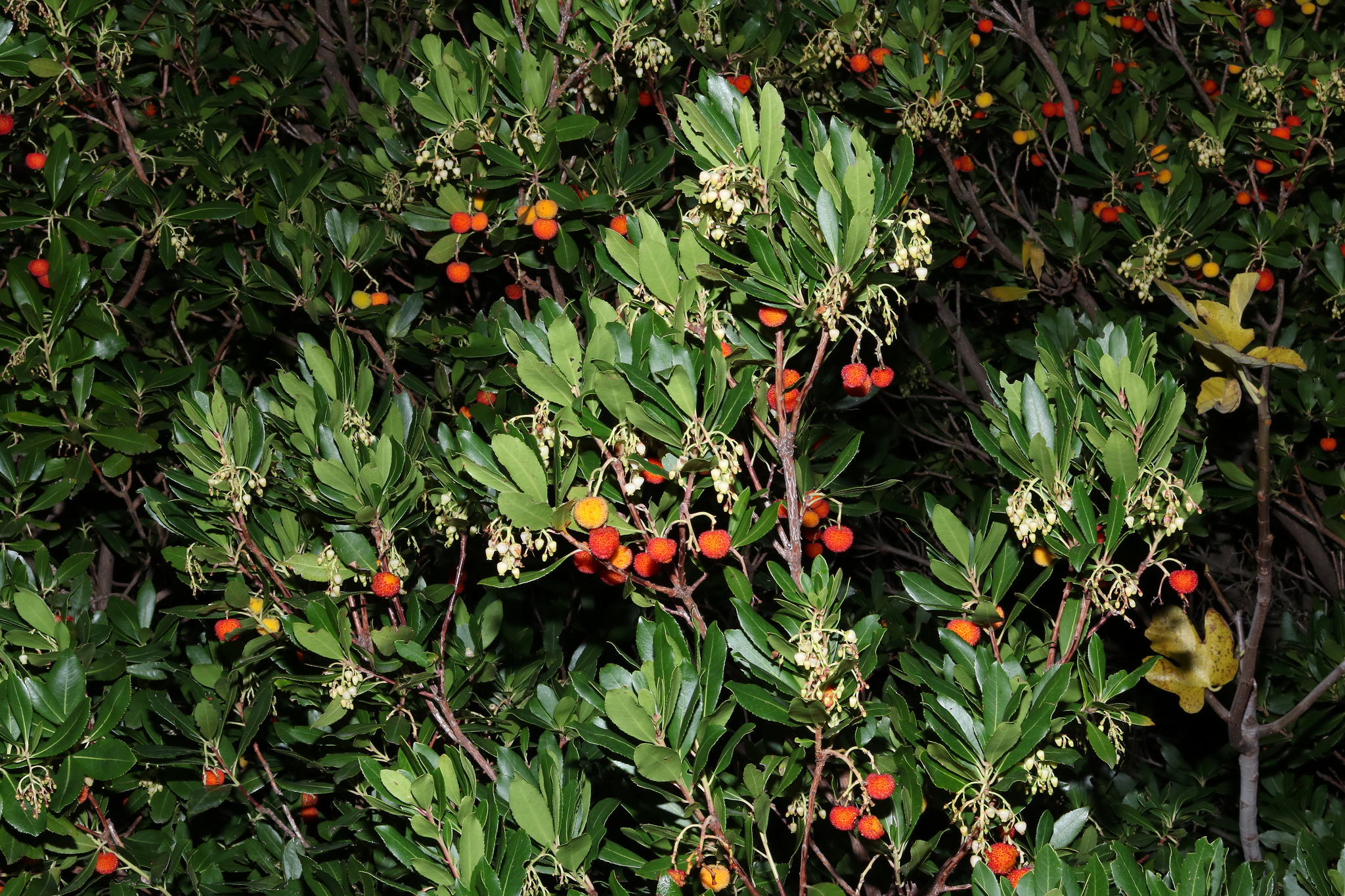
Strawberry tree (Arbutus unedo), the preferred larval host plant of C. jasius along the European Mediterranean coast.
