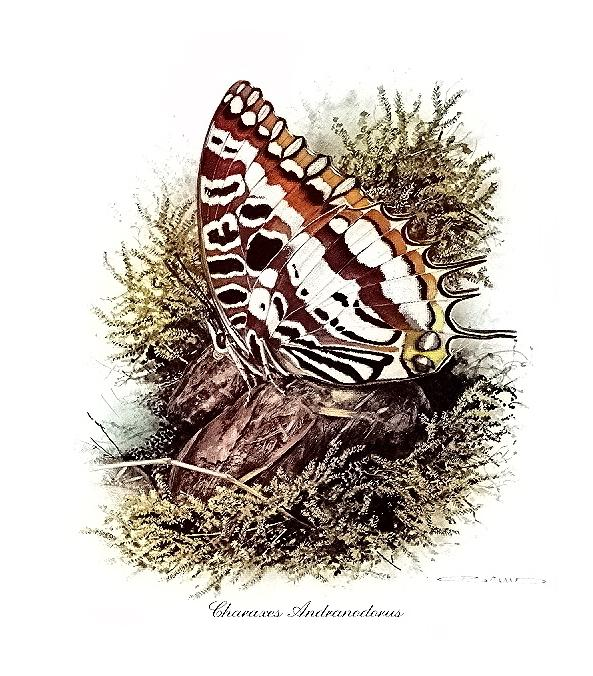

Scientific classification
- Kingdom: Animalia
- Phylum: Arthropoda
- Class: Insecta
- Order: Lepidoptera
- Family: Nymphalidae
- Genus: Charaxes
- Species: C. andranodorus

Binomial name
- Charaxes andranodorus Mabille, 1884

Synonyms
- Charaxes zoippus Mabille, 1884

= Charaxes andranodorus =

Species of butterfly

Charaxes andranodorus is a butterfly in the family Nymphalidae. It is found on Madagascar.

== Description ==
This rare species is one of the most magnificent forms of Charaxes. Above it agrees very nearly with phraortes, the basal part of both wings being not or scarcely darker than the median band; on the forewing, however, the median band is separated from the basal area by large black spots in cellules 1 b—6; the marginal spots of the hindwing are streak-like and much smaller than in phraortes and the distal margin is distinctly tailed also at vein 3. Beneath both wings have the ground-colour red-brown and the white markings have a silvery gloss and are broader than usual; the black markings in the basal part of the hindwing, on the other hand, are reduced in number, so that cellule 7 and cellule 8 each have only one small transverse spot; in the silvery median band, on the contrary, several black spots are placed behind vein 5. Madagascar; very rare.

In 1900, a full description was given by Walter Rothschild and Karl Jordan in Novitates Zoologicae volume 7:287-524 pages 420-422.

== Biology ==
The habitat consists of wet afrotropical evergreen forests and rainforests. See Afrotropical forests.

The larvae feed on Annona senegalensis.

== Subspecies ==
- C. a. andranodorus (eastern Madagascar)

C. (andranadorus) andrefana Viette, 1975 (western Madagascar) is now considered as bona species

=== Related species ===
Historical attempts to assemble a cluster of presumably related species into a "Charaxes jasius Group" have not been wholly convincing. More recent taxonomic revision, corroborated by phylogenetic research, allow a more rational grouping congruent with cladistic relationships. Within a well-populated clade of 27 related species sharing a common ancestor approximately 16 mya during the Miocene, 26 are now considered together as The jasius Group. One of the two lineages within this clade forms a robust monophyletic group of seven species sharing a common ancestor approximately 2-3 mya, i.e. during the Pliocene, and are considered as the jasius subgroup. The second lineage leads to 19 other species within the Jasius group, which are split into three well-populated subgroups of closely related species.

The jasius Group (26 Species):

Clade 1: jasius subgroup (7 species)

Clade 2: contains the well-populated three additional subgroups (19 species) of the jasius Group: called the brutus, pollux, and eudoxus subgroups.

- the eudoxus subgroup (11 species):
- Charaxes eudoxus
- Charaxes lucyae
- Charaxes richelmanni
- Charaxes musakensis
- Charaxes biokensis[stat.rev.2005]
- Charaxes ducarmei
- Charaxes druceanus
- Charaxes tectonis
- Charaxes phraortes
- Charaxes andranodorus
- Charaxes andrefana[stat.rev.2025]

Further exploration of the phylogenetic relationships amongst existing Charaxes taxa is required to improve clarity.
