= Charaxes tectonis =

Scientific classification
- Kingdom: Animalia
- Phylum: Arthropoda
- Class: Insecta
- Order: Lepidoptera
- Family: Nymphalidae
- Genus: Charaxes
- Species: C. tectonis

Binomial name
- Charaxes tectonis Jordan, 1937

Synonyms
- Charaxes druceanus tectonis Jordan, 1937; Charaxes druceanus nebularum Darge, 1977

Species of butterfly

Charaxes tectonis, the mountain silver-barred charaxes, is a butterfly in the family Nymphalidae. It is found in Nigeria and Cameroon. The habitat consists of sub-montane and montane forests.

== Subspecies ==
- Charaxes tectonis tectonis (eastern Nigeria, Cameroon: west to the Bamenda Forest and Mount Oku)
- Charaxes tectonis nebularum Darge, 1977. (Cameroon: Manengouba massif)

== Related species ==
Historical attempts to assemble a cluster of presumably related species into a "Charaxes jasius Group" have not been wholly convincing. More recent taxonomic revision, corroborated by phylogenetic research, allow a more rational grouping congruent with cladistic relationships. Within a well-populated clade of 27 related species sharing a common ancestor approximately 16 mya during the Miocene, 26 are now considered together as The jasius Group. One of the two lineages within this clade forms a robust monophyletic group of seven species sharing a common ancestor approximately 2-3 mya, i.e. during the Pliocene, and are considered as the jasius subgroup. The second lineage leads to 19 other species within the Jasius group, which are split into three well-populated subgroups of closely related species.

The jasius Group (26 Species):

Clade 1: jasius subgroup (7 species)

Clade 2: contains the well-populated three additional subgroups (19 species) of the jasius Group: called the brutus, pollux, and eudoxus subgroups.

- the eudoxus subgroup (11 species):
- Charaxes eudoxus
- Charaxes lucyae
- Charaxes richelmanni
- Charaxes musakensis
- Charaxes biokensis[stat.rev.2005]
- Charaxes ducarmei
- Charaxes druceanus
- Charaxes tectonis
- Charaxes phraortes
- Charaxes andranodorus
- Charaxes andrefana[stat.rev.2025]

Further exploration of the phylogenetic relationships amongst existing Charaxes taxa is required to improve clarity.
