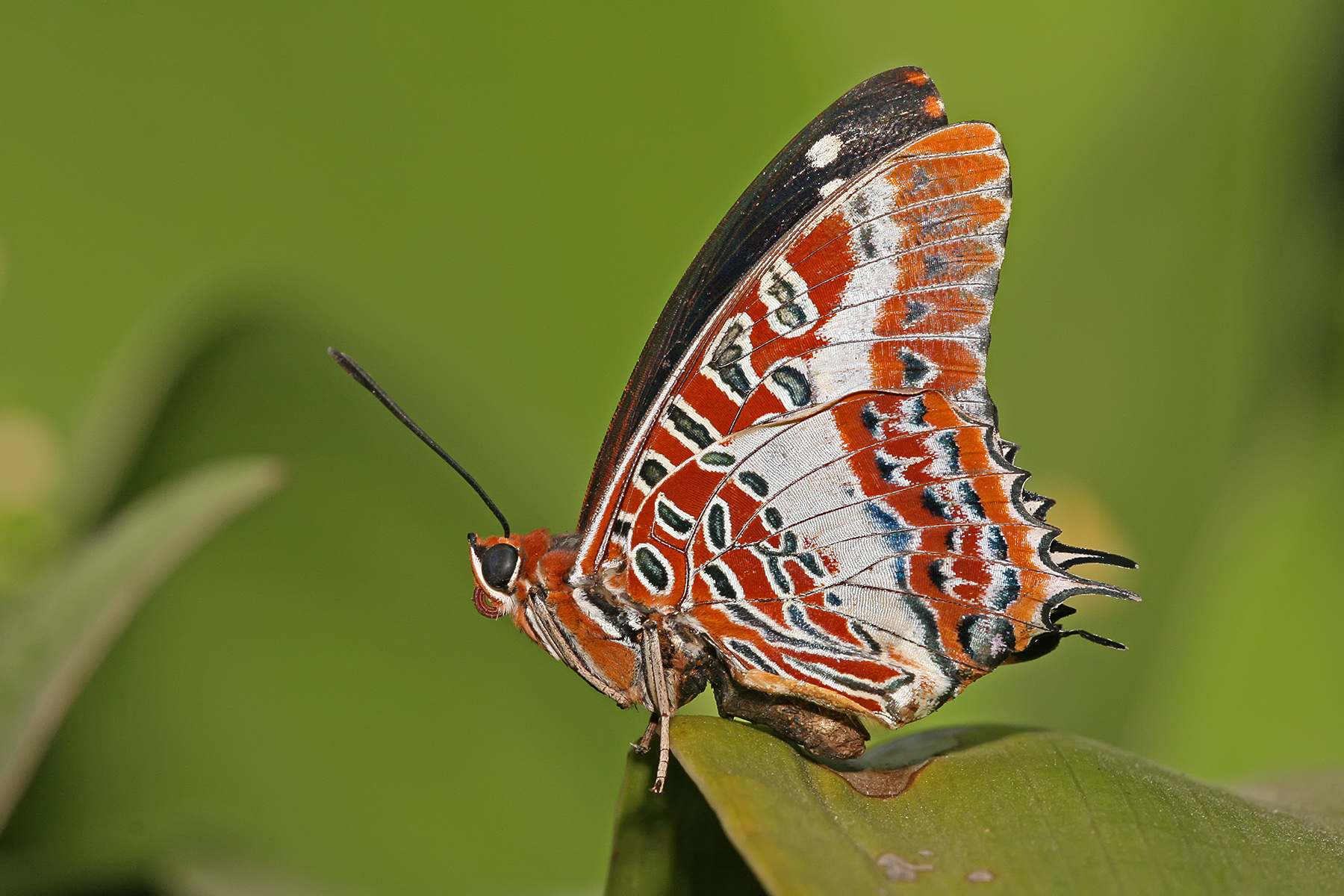
- Charaxes brutus natalensis

Scientific classification
- Kingdom: Animalia
- Phylum: Arthropoda
- Clade: Pancrustacea
- Class: Insecta
- Order: Lepidoptera
- Family: Nymphalidae
- Genus: Charaxes
- Species: C. brutus

Binomial name
- Charaxes brutus (Cramer, [1779])

Synonyms
- Papilio brutus Cramer, 1779; Papilio cajus Herbst, 1790; Charaxes brutus alcyone f. nigribasalis Sevastopulo, 1973; Charaxes brutus augustus f. fractifascia Le Cerf, 1923; Charaxes brutus augustus ab. nigrescens Le Moult, 1933; Charaxes brutus var. natalensis Staudinger, 1885

= Charaxes brutus =

White-barred emperor

Species of butterfly

Charaxes brutus, the white-barred emperor or white-barred charaxes, is a butterfly of the family Nymphalidae. It is found in Africa (see subspecies section for detailed information).

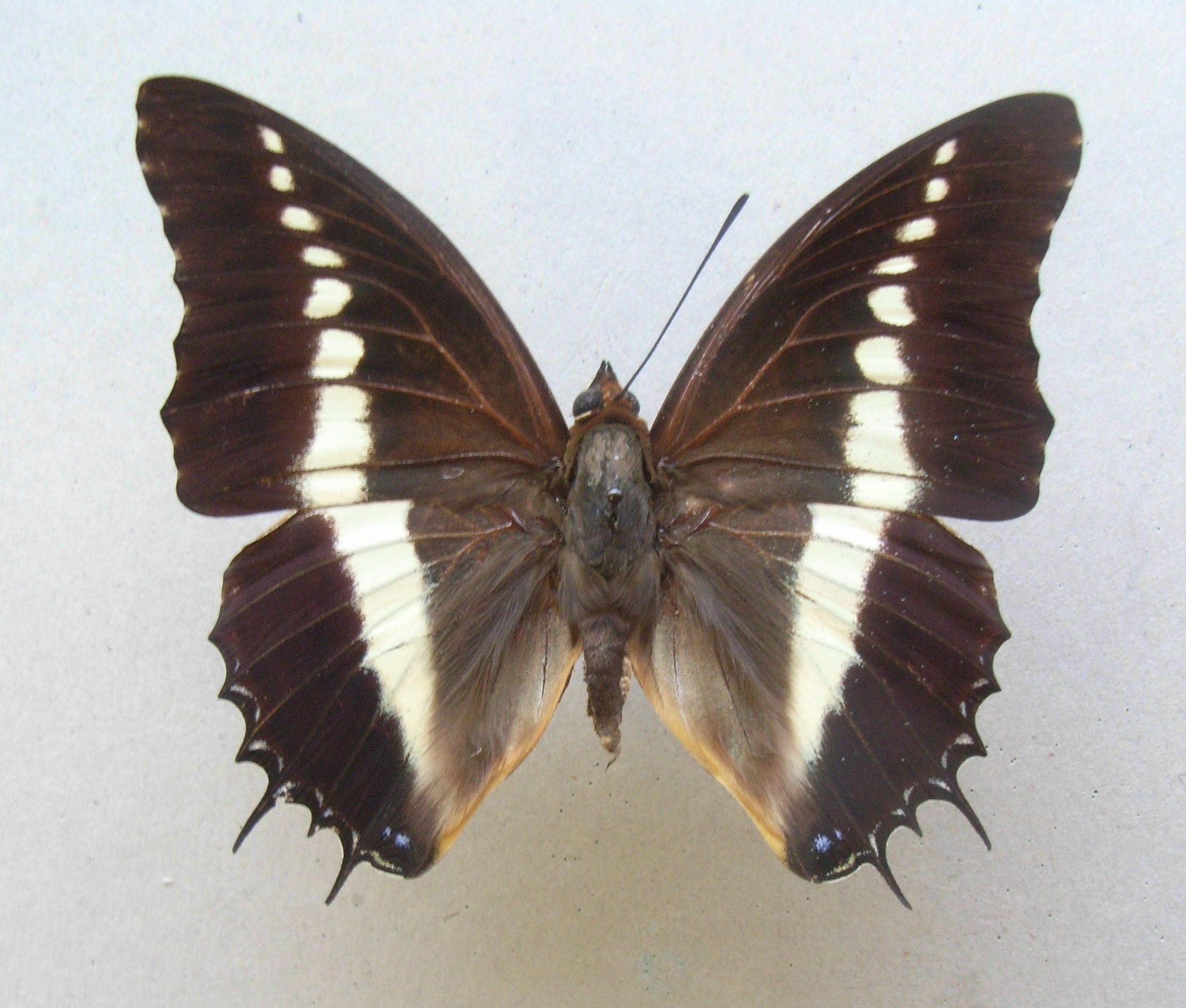

Its flight period is year-round. Notes on the biology of brutus are given by Larsen, T.B. (1991).

== Description ==
Its average wingspan is 60–75 mm in males and 75–90 mm in females. Both wings above black or black-brown with a common white or whitish yellow discal band, which on the forewing is broken up into spots towards the costal margin. Marginal spots wanting; but the hindwing has before the distal margin 2—4 small blue spots, 2 in cellule 1 c and one each in 2 and 3. The under surface has a continuous white discal band; the ground-colour of the basal part is red-brown with the black, white-edged markings peculiar to the genus, which stand out sharply; the marginal part is brown-yellow next to the discal band and then ornamented with large, triangular black spots, distally bordered with pale grey. The hindwing also at vein 3 with a distinct, but short tail. — brutus Cr. The discal band on the upper surface pure white, not or only indistinctly margined with blue, on the forewing also with a spot in cellule 7 and measuring 5 – 9 mm. in breadth in cellule 1 b. Sierra Leone to the Niger. — natalensis Stgr. differs only in having the discal band distinctly margined with blue and the small marginal spots somewhat more distinct than in the type-form. East Africa from Natal to Kilimandjaro. — angustus Rothsch. has the discal band much narrower, only 2. 5–4 mm. in breadth in cellule 1 b of the forewing, and the marginal spots of the forewing very small or entirely suppressed. Old Calabar to Angola.

A full description is given by Rothschild, W. And Jordan, K., 1900 Novitates Zoologicae Volume 7:287-524. page 429 et seq. (for terms see Novitates Zoologicae Volume 5:545-601 )

== Life history ==
Life-sized colour plates and description of the larval and pupal stages of C. brutus and additional related species, illustrated by Dr. V. G. L. van Someren, are readily available. The larvae feed on Grewia species, Entandrophagma delevoi, Trichilia dregeana, Blighia unifugata, Melai azedarach, Trichilia emetica, and Ekebergia capensis.

== Subspecies ==
The following subspecies are recognised:

- C. b. brutus (Senegal, Guinea-Bissau, Guinea, Sierra Leone, Liberia, Ivory Coast, Ghana, Togo, western Nigeria)
- C. b. alcyone Stoneham, 1943 (Kenya: east of Rift Valley, northern and eastern Tanzania)
- C. b. angustus Rothschild, 1900 (Eastern Nigeria, Cameroon, Central African Republic, Gabon, Congo, Northern Angola, Zaire, West Uganda)
- C. b. natalensis Staudinger, 1885 (South Africa, Zimbabwe, Botswana, Mozambique, Malawi, Tanzania)
- C. b. roberti Turlin, 1987 (Pemba Island)

Torben Larsen developed a species numbering system for his 2005 publication Butterflies of West Africa. The nominate subspecies is #737. The 'Larsen' numbers have since been used with permission in A Sharp Eye on Butterflies of Ghana.

== Related species ==
Historical attempts to assemble a cluster of presumably related species into a "Charaxes jasius Group" have not been wholly convincing. More recent taxonomic revision, corroborated by phylogenetic research, allow a more rational grouping congruent with cladistic relationships. Within a well-populated clade of 27 related species sharing a common ancestor approximately 16 mya during the Miocene, 26 are now considered together as The jasius Group. One of the two lineages within this clade forms a robust monophyletic group of seven species sharing a common ancestor approximately 2-3 mya, i.e. during the Pliocene, and are considered as the jasius subgroup. The second lineage leads to 19 other species within the Jasius group, which are split into three well-populated subgroups of closely related species.

The jasius Group (26 species).

Clade 1: the jasius subgroup.

Clade 2: contains the three well-populated additional subgroups (19 species) of the jasius Group, called the brutus, pollux, and eudoxus subgroups.

- the brutus subgroup (4 Species)
- Charaxes brutus
- Charaxes antiquus
- Charaxes junius
- Charaxes andara

Further exploration of the phylogenetic relationships amongst existing Charaxes taxa is required to improve clarity.
