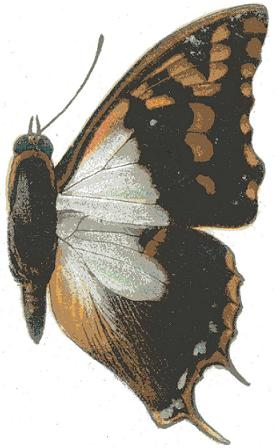

Scientific classification
- Kingdom: Animalia
- Phylum: Arthropoda
- Clade: Pancrustacea
- Class: Insecta
- Order: Lepidoptera
- Family: Nymphalidae
- Genus: Charaxes
- Species: C. lactetinctus

Binomial name
- Charaxes lactetinctus Karsch, 1892

Synonyms
- Charaxes lactetinctus f. jacksonianus van Someren, 1936; Charaxes lactetinctus busogus van Someren, 1972; Charaxes lactetinctus ungemachi f. brunneus Carpenter, 1935

= Charaxes lactetinctus =

Species of butterfly

Charaxes lactetinctus, the blue patch charaxes, is a butterfly in the family Nymphalidae. It is found in Guinea, Ivory Coast, Ghana, Togo, Benin, Nigeria, Cameroon, the Republic of the Congo, the Central African Republic, the Democratic Republic of the Congo, Uganda, Kenya, Ethiopia and possibly Sudan.

== Description ==
Ch. lactetinctus Karsch Both wings above broadly suffused with milk-white at the base; the forewing then black with orange distal band, cleft at the costal margin, but at the hindmargin indistinct in cellules la and lb and with orange marginal spots; the distal half of the hindwing black with narrow orange marginal band, preceded by blue spots; thorax and abdomen above milk-white. Both wings beneath dark violet-brown; the cell of the forewing with two transverse streaks, the first and second black and white ringed, but the third entirely white. A rare species, only observed in the Togo hinterland and Adamaua.

== Biology ==
The habitat consists of savanna, including dry thorn-bush savanna.

The larvae feed on Syzygium cordatum and Maesopsis eminii.

== Subspecies ==
- Charaxes lactetinctus lactetinctus (western Guinea, northern Ivory Coast, Ghana, Togo, Benin, northern Nigeria, Cameroon, Congo, Central African Republic, northern Democratic Republic of the Congo, Uganda, western and north-western Kenya)
- Charaxes lactetinctus ungemachi Le Cerf, 1927 (south-western Ethiopia and possibly Sudan)

Torben Larsen developed a species numbering system for his 2005 publication Butterflies of West Africa. The nominate subspecies is #733. The 'Larsen' numbers have since been used with permission in A Sharp Eye on Butterflies of Ghana.

== Related Species ==
Recent taxonomic revision, corroborated by phylogenetic research, allow more rational grouping of related species (compared with historical attempts) based upon with cladistic relationships. Within a well-populated clade of 27 related species sharing a common ancestor approximately 16 mya during the Miocene, 26 are now considered together as the jasius Group. C. lactetinctus is the 27th species in the Clade, and has undergone remarkable evolutionary divergence over the last 1.5 to 2.5 million years separating it from its closest existing relatives among the eudoxus and pollux subgroups, to the extent that it is considered a monospecific lactetinctus Group.
