= Charaxes junius =

Scientific classification
- Kingdom: Animalia
- Phylum: Arthropoda
- Class: Insecta
- Order: Lepidoptera
- Family: Nymphalidae
- Genus: Charaxes
- Species: C. junius

Binomial name
- Charaxes junius Oberthür, 1880 .

Synonyms
- Charaxes brutus f. ragazzii Storace, 1948

Species of butterfly

Charaxes junius is a butterfly in the family Nymphalidae. It is found in Ethiopia and Sudan. The habitat consists of forests and woodland savanna.

== Description ==
Charaxes junius is distinguished from C. brutus by having the discal band on the upper surface light yellow and in cellule 1 b of the forewing 6–1 mm. in breadth. Abyssinia. - — somalicus Rothsch. only differs from junius in the somewhat narrower median band on both wings. Somaliland.

== Subspecies ==
- Charaxes junius junius (western and south-western Ethiopia)
- Charaxes junius somalicus Rothschild, 1900 (southern Ethiopia, south-eastern Sudan)

== Taxonomy ==
Charaxes junius Oberthür, 1880 is treated as a subspecies of C. brutus (Cramer, 1779) by Van Someren. Henning treats junius as a distinct species on the authority of Plantrou (1983).

== Related species ==
Historical attempts to assemble a cluster of presumably related species into a "Charaxes jasius Group" have not been wholly convincing. More recent taxonomic revision, corroborated by phylogenetic research, allow a more rational grouping congruent with cladistic relationships. Within a well-populated clade of 27 related species sharing a common ancestor approximately 16 mya during the Miocene, 26 are now considered together as The jasius Group. One of the two lineages within this clade forms a robust monophyletic group of seven species sharing a common ancestor approximately 2-3 mya, i.e. during the Pliocene, and are considered as the jasius subgroup. The second lineage leads to 19 other species within the Jasius group, which are split into three well-populated subgroups of closely related species.

The jasius Group (26 Species).

Clade 1: the jasius subgroup.

Clade 2: contains the three well-populated additional subgroups (19 species) of the jasius Group, called the brutus, pollux, and eudoxus subgroups.

- the brutus subgroup (4 Species)
- Charaxes brutus
- Charaxes antiquus
- Charaxes junius
- Charaxes andara

Further exploration of the phylogenetic relationships amongst existing Charaxes taxa is required to improve clarity.
