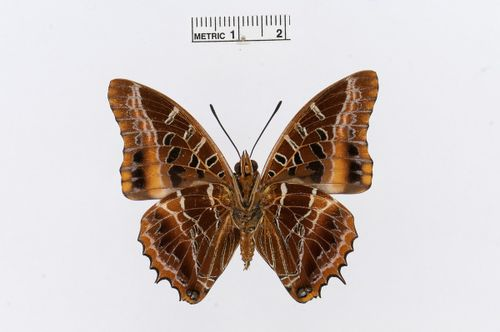

Scientific classification
- Kingdom: Animalia
- Phylum: Arthropoda
- Class: Insecta
- Order: Lepidoptera
- Family: Nymphalidae
- Subfamily: Charaxinae
- Tribe: Charaxini
- Genus: Charaxes
- Species: C. richelmanni

Binomial name
- Charaxes richelmanni Röber, 1936

Synonyms
- Charaxes fallax Richelmann, 1913; Charaxes orientalis Scheven, 1975 (preocc.)

= Charaxes richelmanni =

Species of butterfly

Charaxes richelmanni is a butterfly in the family Nymphalidae. It is found in Cameroon, Gabon, the Republic of Congo, the Central African Republic, the Democratic Republic of Congo and Tanzania. The habitat consists of lowland evergreen forests.

== Description ==
Van Someren. 1970 describes and figures (plate 7) C. richelmanni

== Subspecies ==
- C. r. richelmanni (southern Cameroon, Gabon, Congo, Central African Republic, Democratic Republic of Congo)
- C. r. scheveni Ackery, 1995.(Tanzania)

C. (richelmanni) ducarmei Plantrou, 1982 (Democratic Republic of Congo: Kivu) is now considered as bona species.[Stat.Rev.2005]

== Related species ==
Historical attempts to assemble a cluster of presumably related species into a "Charaxes jasius Group" have not been wholly convincing. More recent taxonomic revision, corroborated by phylogenetic research, allow a more rational grouping congruent with cladistic relationships. Within a well-populated clade of 27 related species sharing a common ancestor approximately 16 mya during the Miocene, 26 are now considered together as The jasius Group. One of the two lineages within this clade forms a robust monophyletic group of seven species sharing a common ancestor approximately 2-3 mya, i.e. during the Pliocene, and are considered as the jasius subgroup. The second lineage leads to 19 other species within the Jasius group, which are split into three well-populated subgroups of closely related species.

The jasius Group (26 Species):

Clade 1: jasius subgroup (7 species)

Clade 2: contains the well-populated three additional subgroups (19 species) of the jasius Group: called the brutus, pollux, and eudoxus subgroups.

- the eudoxus subgroup (11 species):
- Charaxes eudoxus
- Charaxes lucyae
- Charaxes richelmanni
- Charaxes musakensis
- Charaxes biokensis[stat.rev.2005]
- Charaxes ducarmei
- Charaxes druceanus
- Charaxes tectonis
- Charaxes phraortes
- Charaxes andranodorus
- Charaxes andrefana[stat.rev.2025]

Further exploration of the phylogenetic relationships amongst existing Charaxes taxa is required to improve clarity.
