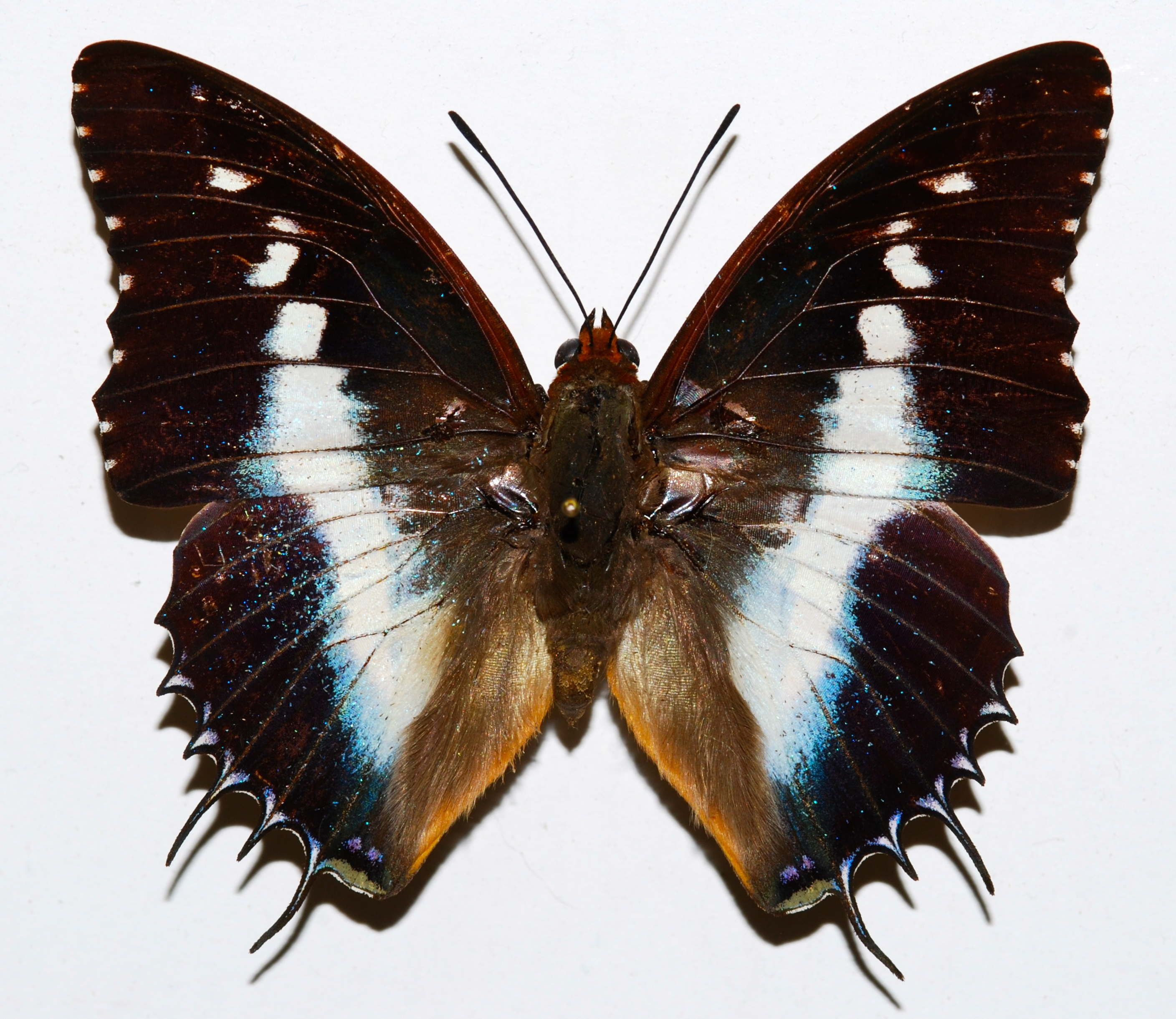

Scientific classification
- Kingdom: Animalia
- Phylum: Arthropoda
- Class: Insecta
- Order: Lepidoptera
- Family: Nymphalidae
- Genus: Charaxes
- Species: C. andara

Binomial name
- Charaxes andara Ward, 1873

= Charaxes andara =

Species of butterfly

Charaxes andara is a butterfly in the family Nymphalidae. It is found in eastern and southern Madagascar, where it is found in Afrotropical forests. It is very similar to Charaxes brutus, of which it has been considered a subspecies.

== Description ==
=== Male ===
Edges of abdominal segments above sometimes slightly grey. Wings above with a violet tint; band conspicuously edged with pale blue from M2 of forewing to (SM1) of the hindwing. Forewing; band 6 to 8 mm broad before SM2 (inclusive of blue border), patch M1-M2 3 to 4 mm wide, spot R2-R3 generally elongate, narrow, sometimes prolonged to bar D, but its proximal portion then shaded with brown, spot R1-R2 often also elongate, spots SC4-R1 mostly bluish, small, often only vestigial; marginal spots white as a rule, often slightly orange proximally, in one specimen (in Henley Grose-Smith's collection) all orange and rather larger than usually. Hindwing: two submarginal dots M2-SM2, blue; admarginal bluish-creamy white line seldom continuous, mostly very widely interrupted between veins, there remaining only triangular spots at the ends of the veins, these spots extending into tails, anal admarginal spot, however, linear and transverse, bluish olive; discal band stopping at (SM1).

Underside rufous red from base to discal band, bars without grey centres. Forewing: cell-bar 3 somewhat rounded, 4 rather slender, as is bar D; median bars SC3-R2 also slender, bars SC3-R2 each very much longer than broad (a part of white border) discal bars SC4-R1 dark olive; outer area of wing from white band to margin tawny ochraceous; black postdiscal patches R1-M! rather smaller than in the continental forms, less pointed. Hindwing: basal costal bar not touching white costal edge, often rounded, almost circular, white band posteriorly as well as anteriorly with brown spots or vestiges of such; interspace between white discal band and black postdiscal bars cinnamon rufous, as a rule darker than basal area; postdiscal bars C-M2 transverse, not or slightly curved, rather thin, not dilated in middle, edged olive distally; submarginal interspace chestnut, seldom rufous chestnut, much wider than in the other forms, bar R1-R2 5 mm distant from submarginal bar, much shaded with white distally, interspaces M1-SM2 olive, with blue and white submarginal dots; submarginal bars blackish olive, transverse, linear; wing more heavily dentate than in the continental forms of C. brutus, tail R3 7 to 8 mm long, tail M1 3 to 5 mm, tail M2 6 1/2 to 7 1/2 mm.

=== Female ===
Wings above less bluish than in male. Forewing: costal margin more or less tawny; band pale orange, white from M2 backwards, posteriorly edged with pale blue at both sides, but especially proximally, 10 mm broad at SM2, patch R3-M1 7 mm long, oblique proximally, patch R2-R3 extended to bar D, patch R1-R2 about twice as long as broad, with two discal spots in front, besides the two rounded postdiscal spots SC1-R1, discal spot SC5-R1 rather larger, produced distad along R1 and mostly joined to the postdiscal spot, discal spot SC4=SC5 linear, an orange streak also in front of SC4; marginal spots pale orange. Hindwing: band broadly bordered with bluish white proximally, basal half of abdominal fold also milky white, pale blue distal border of band gradually narrowing costad; blue submarginal dots M2-SM2 heavy, fused together as a rule, dot M1-M2 often present; admarginal line orange between, creamy buff or bluish at veins, nearly continuous, or interrupted at the veins, often obsolete from C to R1, anal portion as in male but wider.

Underside: as in male, but submarginal area of hindwing more olive and white, the chestnut scaling very much reduced, sometimes almost entirely replaced by olive and white; tails and teeth as in male, rather broader at base and longer.

Length of forewing: male 34–41 mm, female 42–46 mm.

Habitat: Madagascar, apparently all over the island in suitable localities; a forest insect.

== Related species ==
Historical attempts to assemble a cluster of presumably related species into a "Charaxes jasius Group" have not been wholly convincing. More recent taxonomic revision, corroborated by phylogenetic research, allow a more rational grouping congruent with cladistic relationships. Within a well-populated clade of 27 related species sharing a common ancestor approximately 16 mya during the Miocene, 26 are now considered together as The jasius Group. One of the two lineages within this clade forms a robust monophyletic group of seven species sharing a common ancestor approximately 2-3 mya, i.e. during the Pliocene, and are considered as the jasius subgroup. The second lineage leads to 19 other species within the Jasius group, which are split into three well-populated subgroups of closely related species.

The jasius Group (26 Species).

Clade 1: the jasius subgroup.

Clade 2: contains the three well-populated additional subgroups (19 species) of the jasius Group, called the brutus, pollux, and eudoxus subgroups.

- the brutus subgroup (4 Species)
- Charaxes brutus
- Charaxes antiquus
- Charaxes junius
- Charaxes andara

Further exploration of the phylogenetic relationships amongst existing Charaxes taxa is required to improve clarity.
