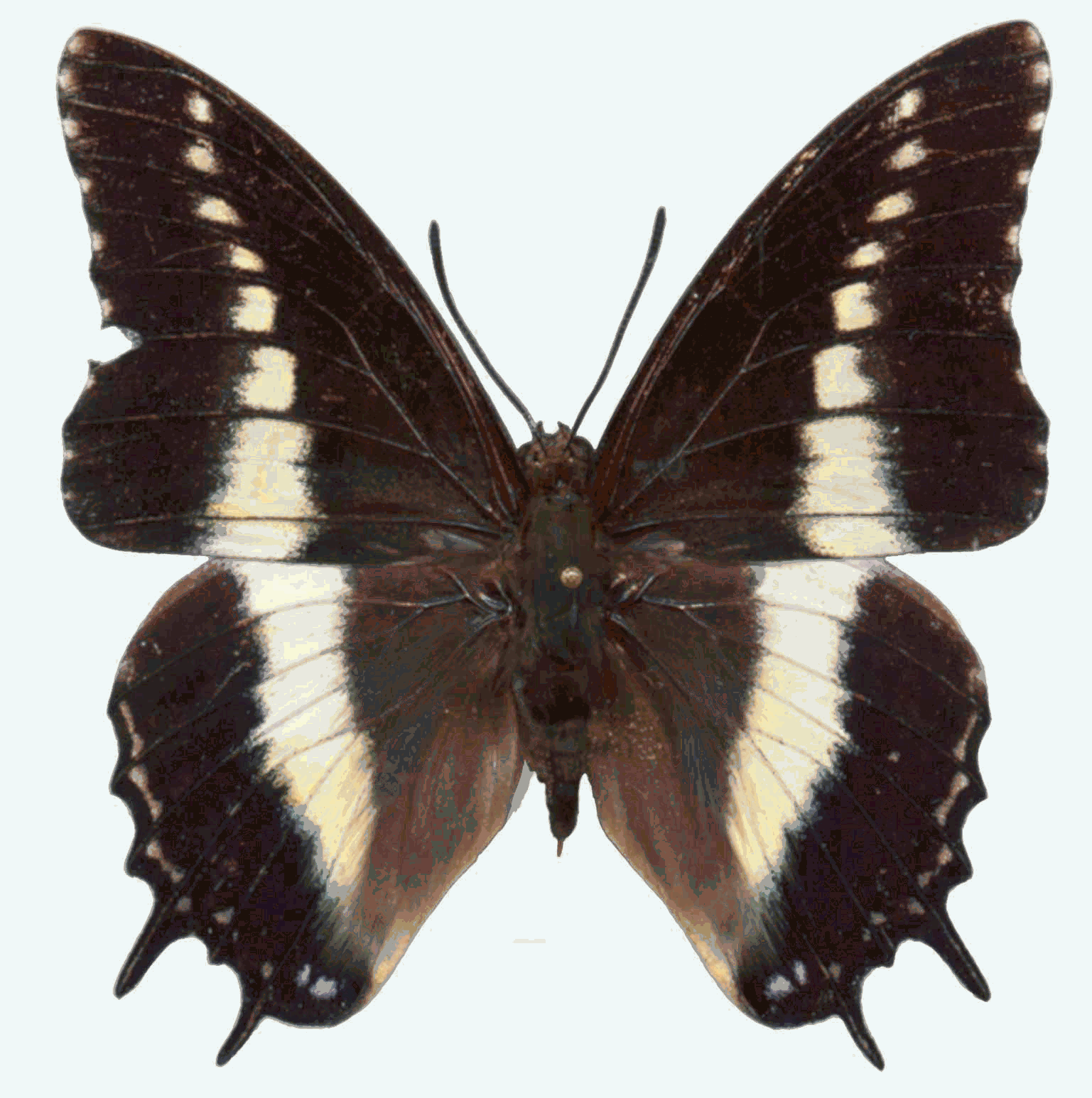
- Male
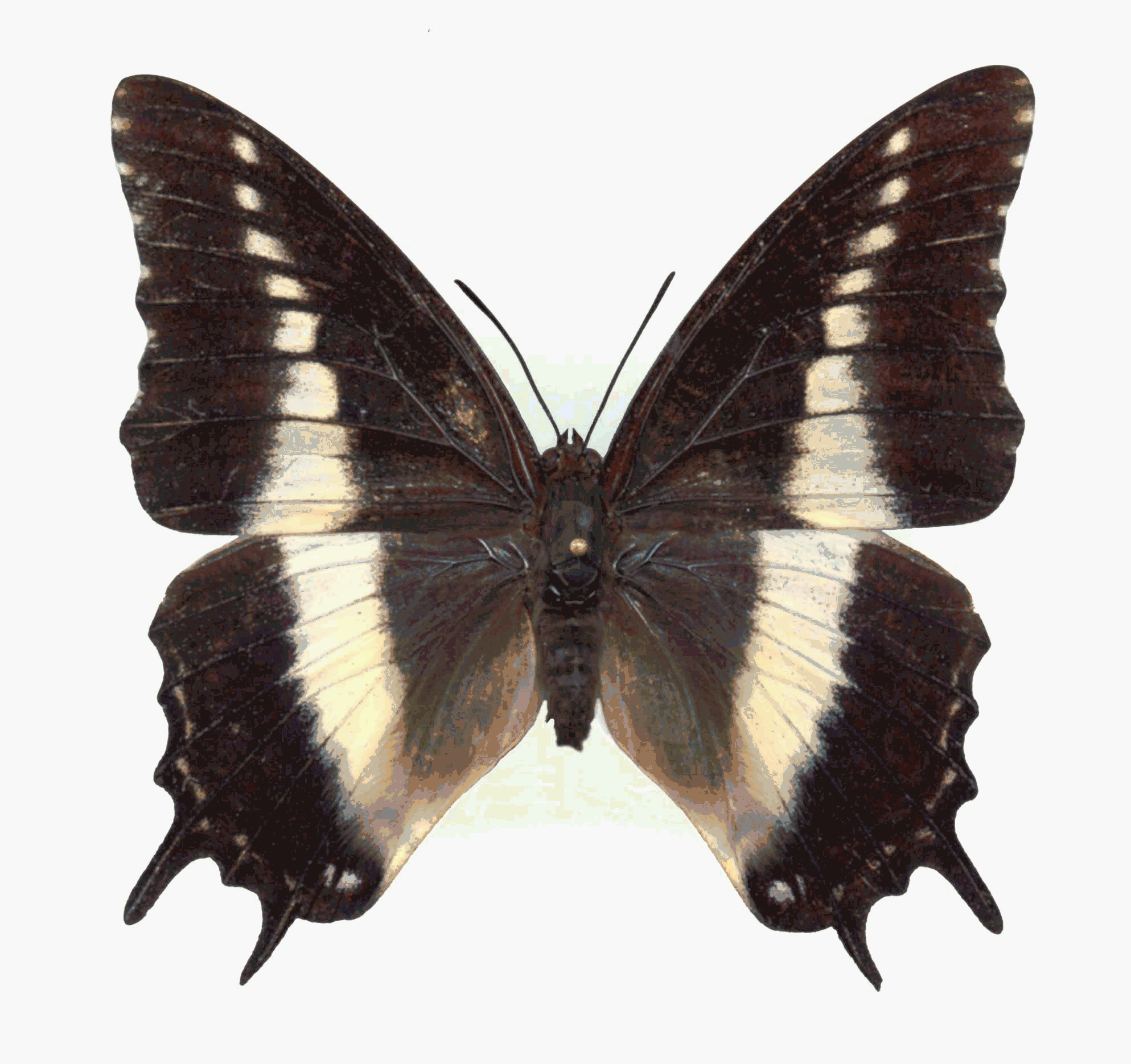
- Female

Scientific classification
- Kingdom: Animalia
- Phylum: Arthropoda
- Class: Insecta
- Order: Lepidoptera
- Family: Nymphalidae
- Genus: Charaxes
- Species: C. antiquus

Binomial name
- Charaxes antiquus Joicey & Talbot, 1926

Synonyms
- Charaxes brutus antiquus Joicey & Talbot, 1926

= Charaxes antiquus =

Species of butterfly

Charaxes antiquus is a butterfly in the family Nymphalidae. It is found on the island of São Tomé. The habitat consists of forests and woodland. The species was named by James John Joicey and George Talbot in 1926.

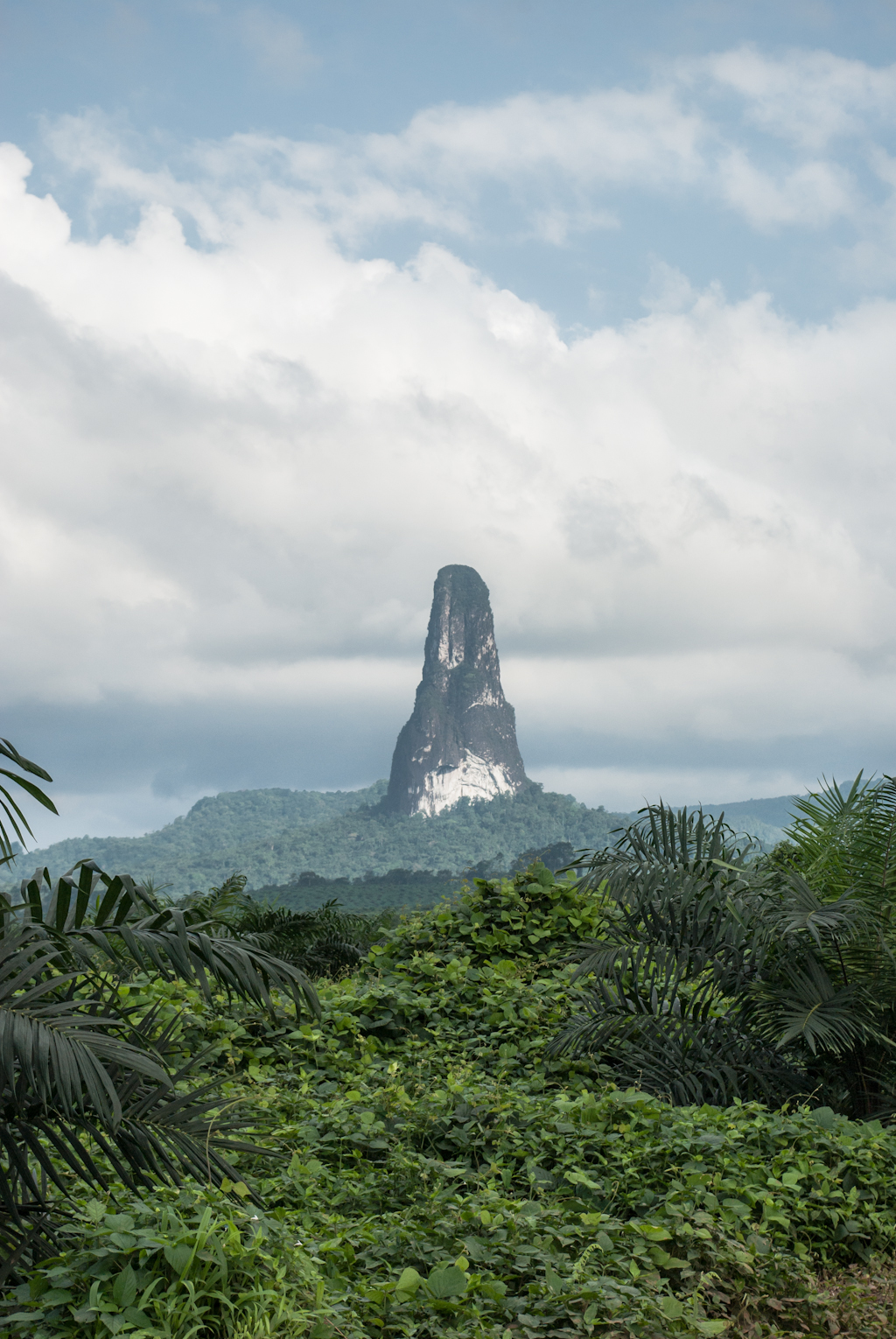
Forest habitat on São Tomé

== Description ==
The butterfly has black edges with two pointy edges on the bottom end, it has a white striped nearly in the middle, and the remainder is colored dark brown and is lighter on the bottom. It is measured 10 centimeters long.

== Subspecies ==
The species is sometimes treated as a subspecies of Charaxes brutus.

== Related species ==
Historical attempts to assemble a cluster of presumably related species into a "Charaxes jasius Group" have not been wholly convincing. More recent taxonomic revision, corroborated by phylogenetic research, allow a more rational grouping congruent with cladistic relationships. Within a well-populated clade of 27 related species sharing a common ancestor approximately 16 mya during the Miocene, 26 are now considered together as The jasius Group. One of the two lineages within this clade forms a robust monophyletic group of seven species sharing a common ancestor approximately 2-3 mya, i.e. during the Pliocene, and are considered as the jasius subgroup. The second lineage leads to 19 other species within the Jasius group, which are split into three well-populated subgroups of closely related species.

The jasius Group (26 Species).

Clade 1: the jasius subgroup.

Clade 2: contains the three well-populated additional subgroups (19 species) of the jasius Group, called the brutus, pollux, and eudoxus subgroups.

- the brutus subgroup (4 Species)
- Charaxes brutus
- Charaxes antiquus
- Charaxes junius
- Charaxes andara

Further exploration of the phylogenetic relationships amongst existing Charaxes taxa is required to improve clarity.
