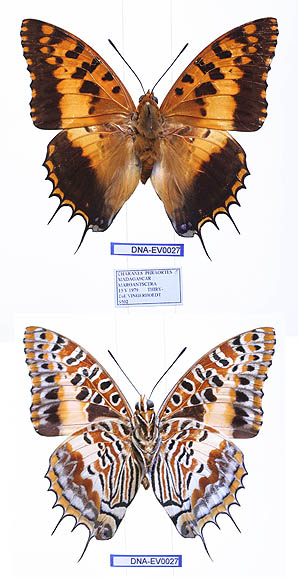

Scientific classification
- Kingdom: Animalia
- Phylum: Arthropoda
- Class: Insecta
- Order: Lepidoptera
- Family: Nymphalidae
- Subfamily: Charaxinae
- Tribe: Charaxini
- Genus: Charaxes
- Species: C. phraortes

Binomial name
- Charaxes phraortes Doubleday, 1847

= Charaxes phraortes =

Species of butterfly

Charaxes phraortes is a butterfly in the family Nymphalidae. It is found in north-eastern Madagascar. The habitat consists of wet coastal forests.

== Description ==
Similar to pollux and phoebus, but has the tails on the hindwing much longer,8—9 mm. in length; the basal part of the upper surface is light red-brown and but little darker than the broad orange-brown median band; the cell of the forewing with two large black spots and the median band with large black spots in cellules 2—4; the hindwing above at the distal margin with orange-yellow transverse spots in 2—7; the hindwing beneath, with three black, white-bordered transverse spots at the costal margin in cellule 8;the ground-colour of the basal part bright red-brown. Madagascar; rare.

== Related species ==
Historical attempts to assemble a cluster of presumably related species into a "Charaxes jasius Group" have not been wholly convincing. More recent taxonomic revision, corroborated by phylogenetic research, allow a more rational grouping congruent with cladistic relationships. Within a well-populated clade of 27 related species sharing a common ancestor approximately 16 mya during the Miocene, 26 are now considered together as The jasius Group. One of the two lineages within this clade forms a robust monophyletic group of seven species sharing a common ancestor approximately 2-3 mya, i.e. during the Pliocene, and are considered as the jasius subgroup. The second lineage leads to 19 other species within the Jasius group, which are split into three well-populated subgroups of closely related species.

The jasius Group (26 Species):

Clade 1: jasius subgroup (7 species)

Clade 2: contains the well-populated three additional subgroups (19 species) of the jasius Group: called the brutus, pollux, and eudoxus subgroups.

- the eudoxus subgroup (11 species):
- Charaxes eudoxus
- Charaxes lucyae
- Charaxes richelmanni
- Charaxes musakensis
- Charaxes biokensis[stat.rev.2005]
- Charaxes ducarmei
- Charaxes druceanus
- Charaxes tectonis
- Charaxes phraortes
- Charaxes andranodorus
- Charaxes andrefana[stat.rev.2025]

Further exploration of the phylogenetic relationships amongst existing Charaxes taxa is required to improve clarity.
