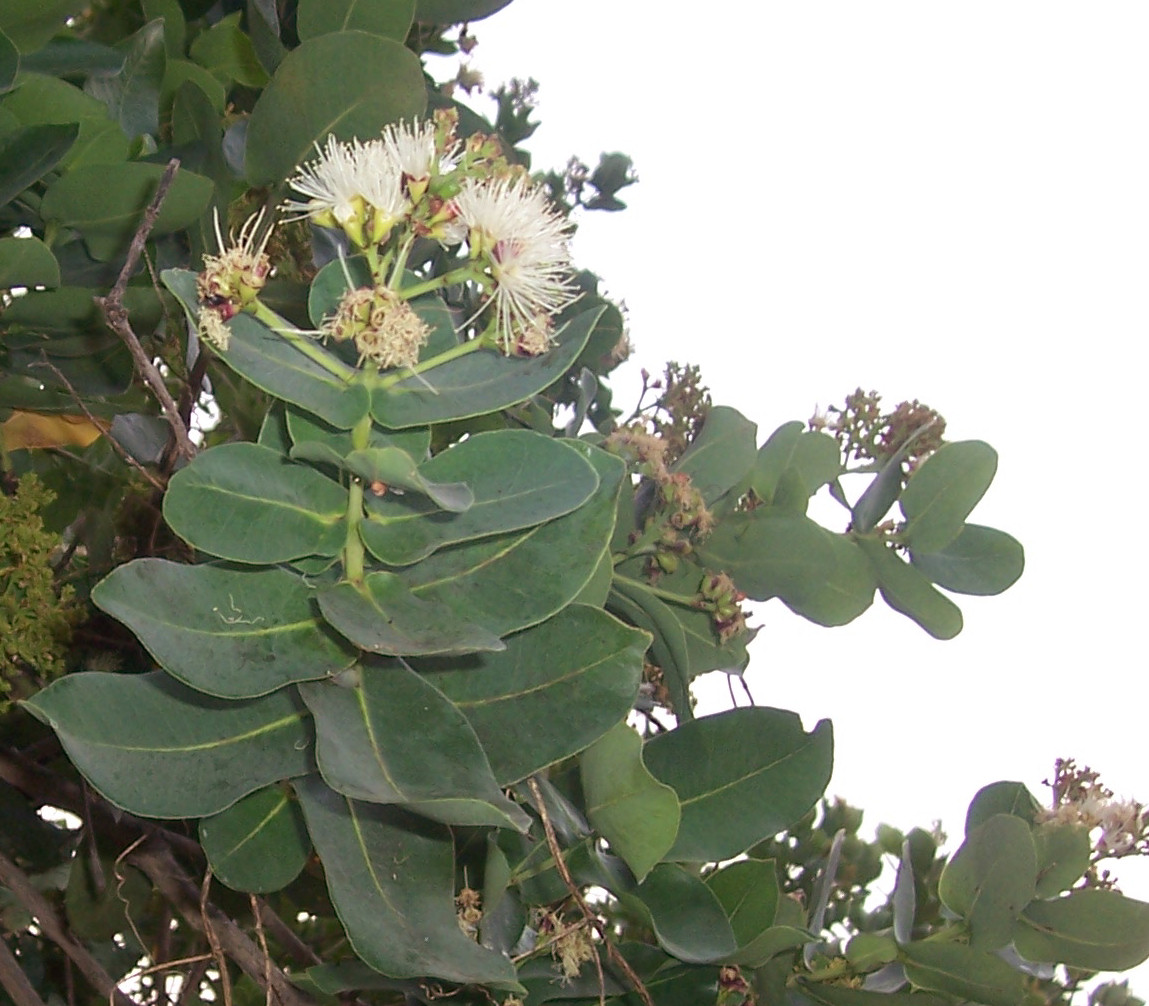
- Hute (Syzygium cordatum)

Conservation status
- Least Concern (IUCN 3.1)

Scientific classification
- Kingdom: Plantae
- Clade: Tracheophytes
- Clade: Angiosperms
- Clade: Eudicots
- Clade: Rosids
- Order: Myrtales
- Family: Myrtaceae
- Genus: Syzygium
- Species: S. cordatum

Binomial name
- Syzygium cordatum Hochst. ex C.Krauss

Varieties
- Syzygium cordatum var. cordatum; Syzygium cordatum var. gracile Amshoff

Synonyms
- Eugenia cordata (Hochst. ex C.Krauss) G.Lawson, nom. illeg. homonym. post.; synonyms of var. cordatum: Jambosa cymifera E.Mey.; Syzygium cordifolium Klotzsch; Syzygium cymiferum (E.Mey.) C.Presl

= Syzygium cordatum =

Species of tree

Syzygium cordatum is an evergreen, water-loving tree native to tropical and southern Africa, which grows to a height of 8–15 m. This tree is often found near streams, on forest margins or in swampy spots. The leaves are elliptic to circular, bluish green on top and a paler green below. Young leaves are reddish. The white to pinkish fragrant flowers are borne in branched terminals and have numerous fluffy stamens and produce abundant nectar. It flowers from August to November. The fruits are oval berries, red to dark-purple when ripe.

Common names are waterbessie (Afrikaans), undoni, umSwi, umJoni and hute (Shona), trâm mốc, trâm vối or vối rừng (Vietnamese). "Water berry" is also used for other species of Syzygium.

== Distribution ==
It is native to central, eastern, and southern Africa, ranging from Gabon and Uganda in the north to the Cape Provinces of South Africa. It grows along streambanks, in forest margins, in bush or open grassy and sometimes high country.

== Uses ==
This tree is known for its many uses. The fleshy fruit is slightly acidic in flavour and is eaten by children, monkeys, bush-babies, bats and birds. The berries are also used to sometimes make an alcoholic drink. The powdered bark is used as a fish poison. In central Africa the tree is known as a remedy for stomach ache and diarrhoea. It is also used to treat respiratory ailments and tuberculosis

== Gallery ==
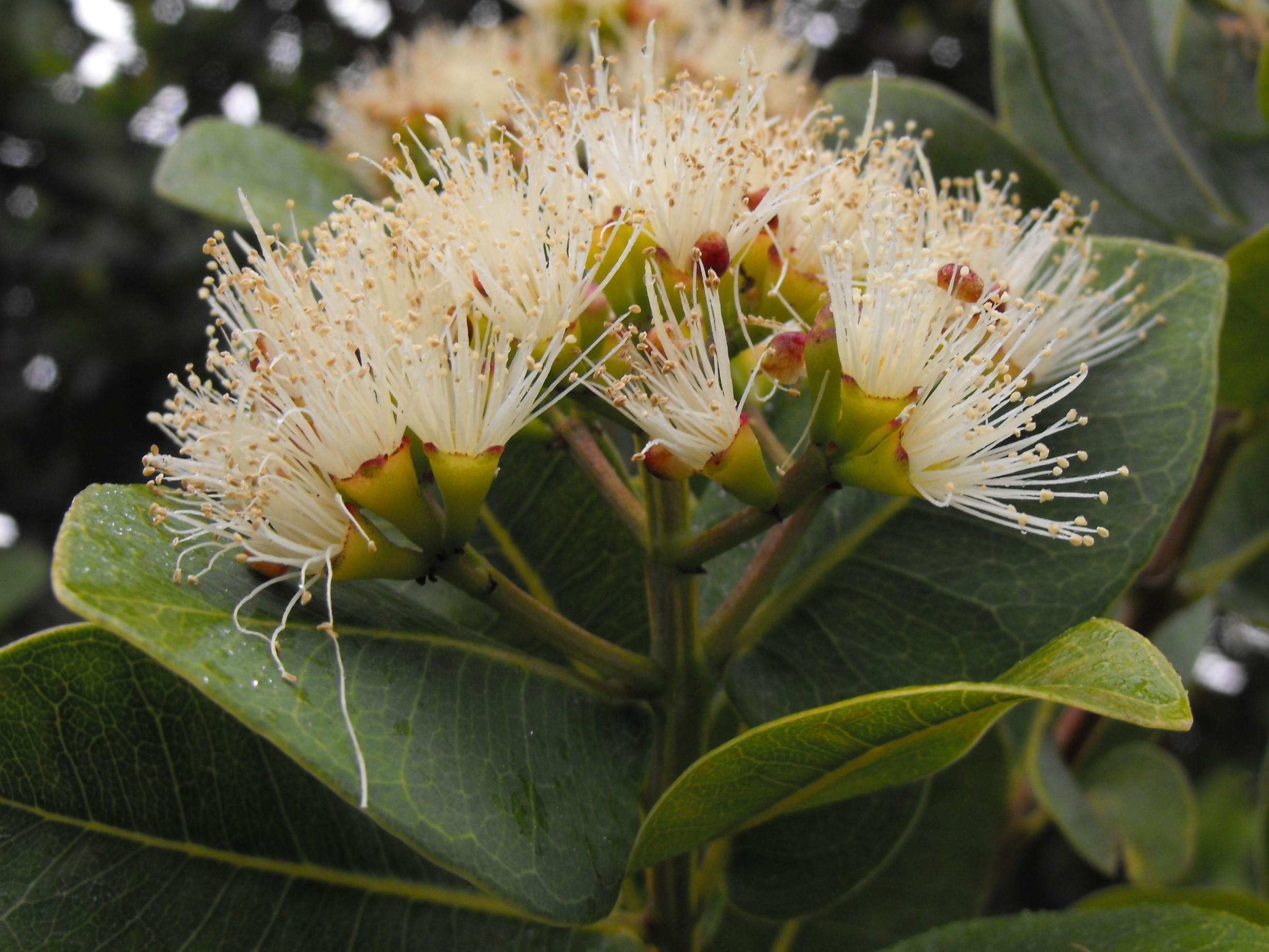
Flowers

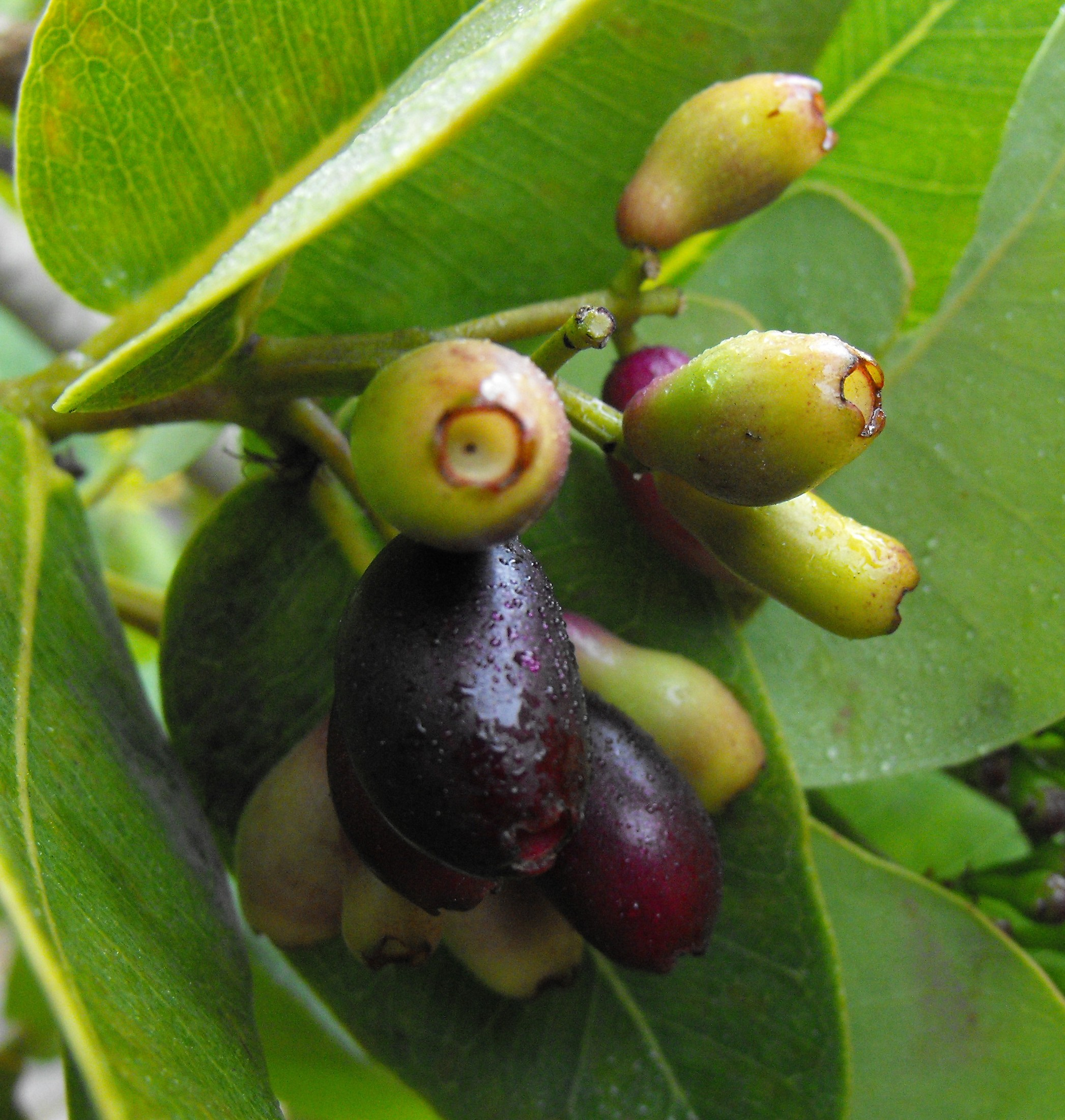
Fruit

== See also ==
- List of fruits
