= Charaxes elwesi =

Scientific classification
- Domain: Eukaryota
- Kingdom: Animalia
- Phylum: Arthropoda
- Class: Insecta
- Order: Lepidoptera
- Family: Nymphalidae
- Genus: Charaxes
- Species: C. elwesi

Binomial name
- Charaxes elwesi Joicey & Talbot, 1922

Species of butterfly

Charaxes elwesi is a butterfly in the family Nymphalidae. It was described by James John Joicey and George Talbot in 1922. It is endemic to Sumbawa and Sumba in the Indomalayan realm (near the Wallace Line).

Charaxes elwesi is a large butterfly. The wings have a silvery beige basal part and a light brown distal part. The forewings are concave, with a median line ornamentation of white dots. On the hind wings, with a club-like tail, the silvery-beige basal part leaves only a light brown band with a submarginal line of white spots.

The underside is beige with purple reflections with a submarginal line of light dots on the hindwing.

The original description reads

"This is represented by a single specimen which had remained for many years in the collection of H. J. Elwes, Esq. It appears to be allied to nitebis Hew., but is quite distinct.

Male. Upperside with black-brown ground-colour. Fore wing with brownish-white basal area and spots. Basal area to inner marginal two-thirds, filling base of 2, not quite reaching end of cell and limited by upper edge of cell. Costa pale brown from base to end of second subcostal. Postdiscal spots: two near bases of cellules 5 and 6, a third in 4 more distal, a fourth in 2 curved, a fifth in 2 elbowed and more proximal, the last curved from vein 2 to the basal area above the submedian; these spots separated by the veins and better defined on the inner edge, the lower three occupying a similar position to those in nitebis. Three subcostal spots, the smaller near base of cellule 7, a much larger one in 6, directed distad, the third smaller in 5. A row of seven submarginal spots placed somewhat as in nitebis, but sharply defined, the upper three rounded, the next three somewhat pointed proximally, the lower one rounded on the inside. Apex of fore wing more produced than in nitebis. Hind wing with a long spatulate tail. Proximal two-thirds greyish-white over a yellow-brown ground-colour; outer edge of this area sharply defined, outwardly curved at the middle. Distal area black-brown with a pale narrower marginal border, broader between veins 3 and 2 and including the tail, deeply incurved in cellule 3. A submarginal row of six white spots in 2—T7 placed midway between the margin and edge of proximal area. The anal angle of both wings is torn out, but there is an indication of a black round spot bearing two small white spots.

Underside with yellow-brown ground-colour scaled with grey-white. Markings as above. Fore wing with three curved blackish basal lines, broken at the lower edge of cell. Hind wing with a pale proximal area browner than above and traversed by blackish lines. Two irregular subbasal lines fairly close together and an irregular discal line beyond the cell, formed of curved marks divided by the veins, and distally curved at the middle. A postdiscal line of curved marks nearly straight from vein 7 to submedian fold, followed by a heavy dark line, the interspace forming pale spots. White submarginal spots as above.

The specimen is worn so much that the more obscure markings and true colour cannot be diagnosed. Length of fore wing: 46 mm."

== Subspecies ==
- Charaxes elwesi elwesi (Sumbawa)
- Charaxes elwesi pugnax Tsukada & Nishiyama, 1979 (Sumba)

== Taxonomy ==
Subspecies of Charaxes nitebis in Lepindex
