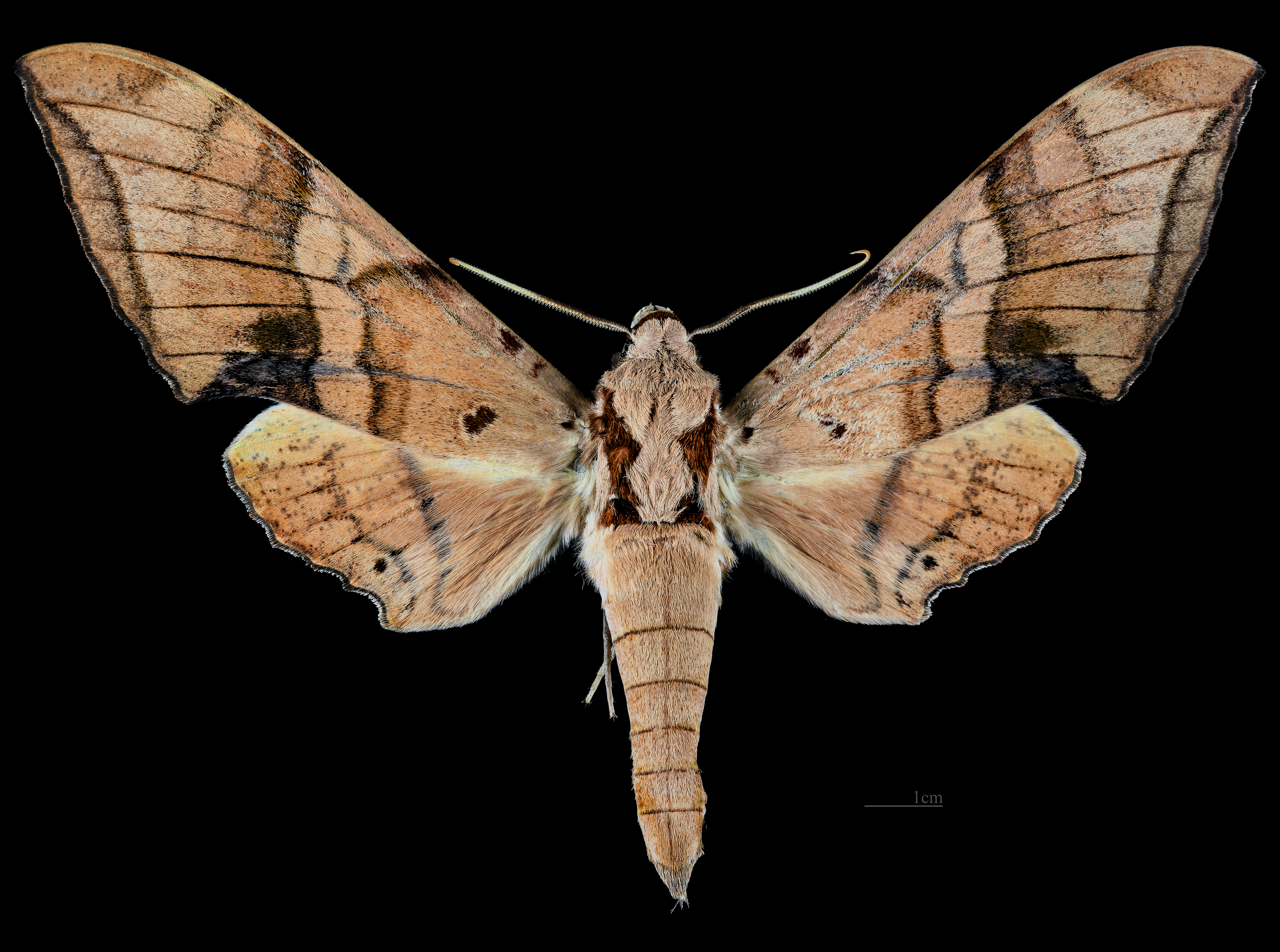
- Male dorsal
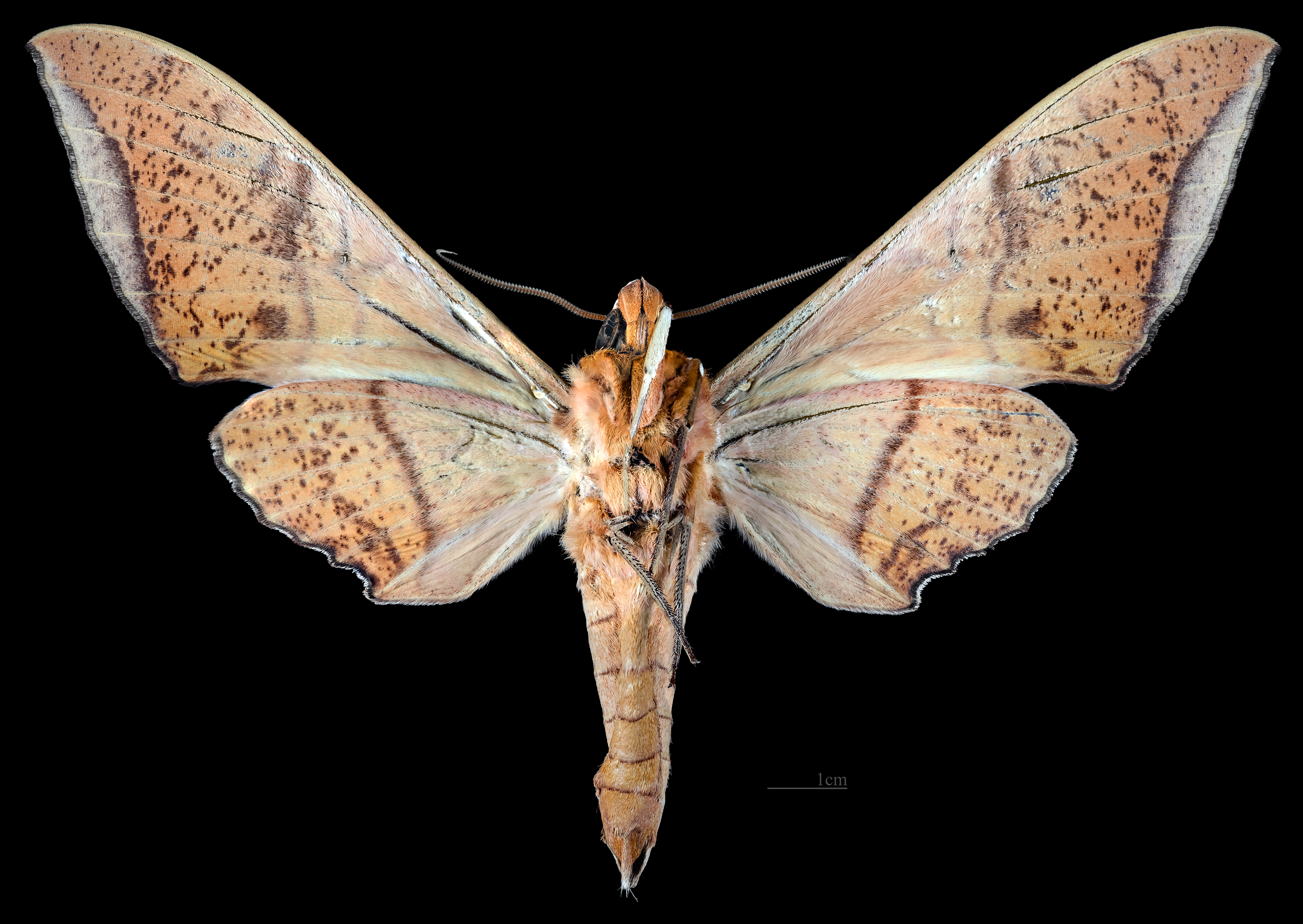
- male ventral

Scientific classification
- Kingdom: Animalia
- Phylum: Arthropoda
- Class: Insecta
- Order: Lepidoptera
- Family: Sphingidae
- Genus: Ambulyx
- Species: A. cyclasticta

Binomial name
- Ambulyx cyclasticta (Joicey & Kaye, 1917)

Synonyms
- Oxyambulyx cyclasticta Joicey & Kaye, 1917

= Ambulyx cyclasticta =

Species of moth

Ambulyx cyclasticta is a species of moth of the family Sphingidae.

== Distribution ==
It is known from Thailand and Burma.

== Description ==
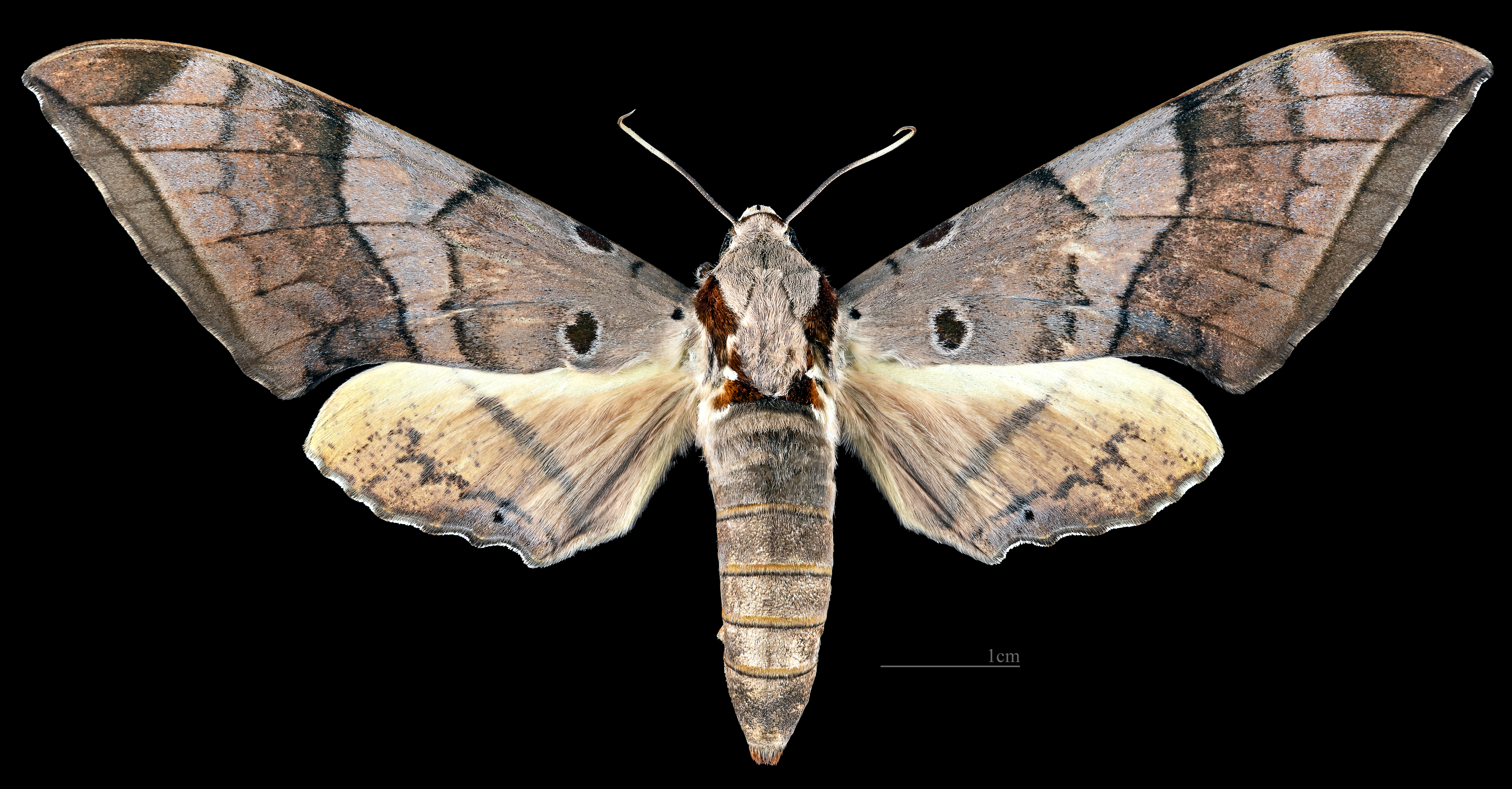
Female dorsal

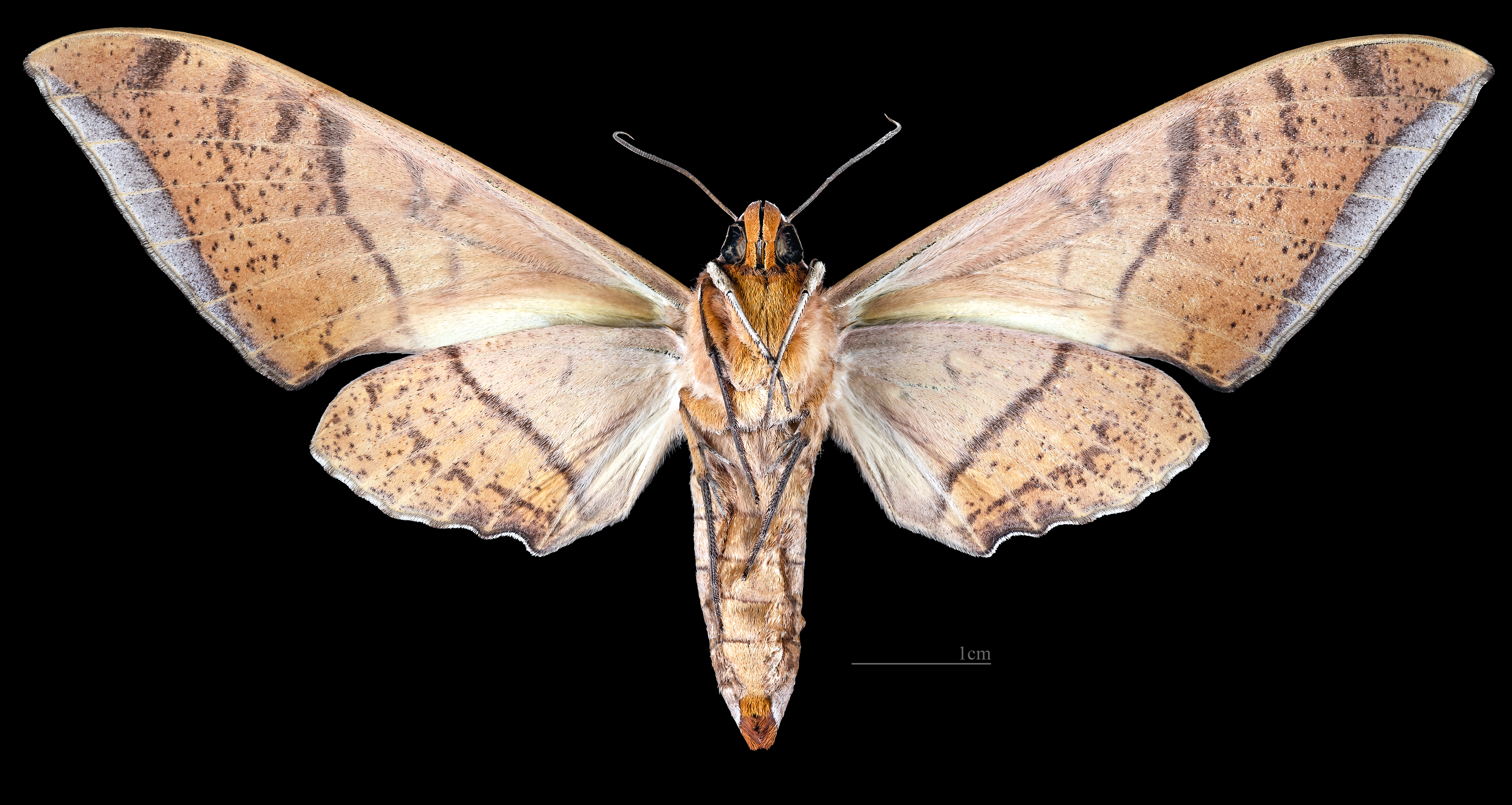
Female ventral
