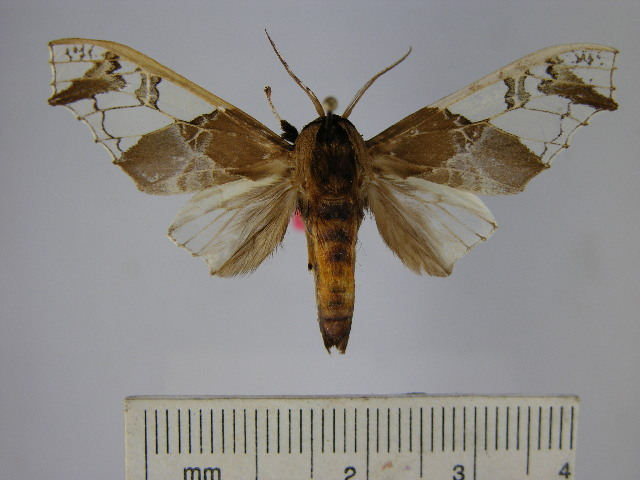

Scientific classification
- Domain: Eukaryota
- Kingdom: Animalia
- Phylum: Arthropoda
- Class: Insecta
- Order: Lepidoptera
- Superfamily: Noctuoidea
- Family: Erebidae
- Subfamily: Arctiinae
- Genus: Parathyris
- Species: P. semivitrea

Binomial name
- Parathyris semivitrea (Joicey & Talbot, 1916)

Synonyms
- Thyrarctia semivitrea Joicey & Talbot, 1916

= Parathyris semivitrea =

Species of moth

Parathyris semivitrea is a moth of the family Erebidae first described by James John Joicey and George Talbot in 1916. It is found in French Guiana and Peru.
