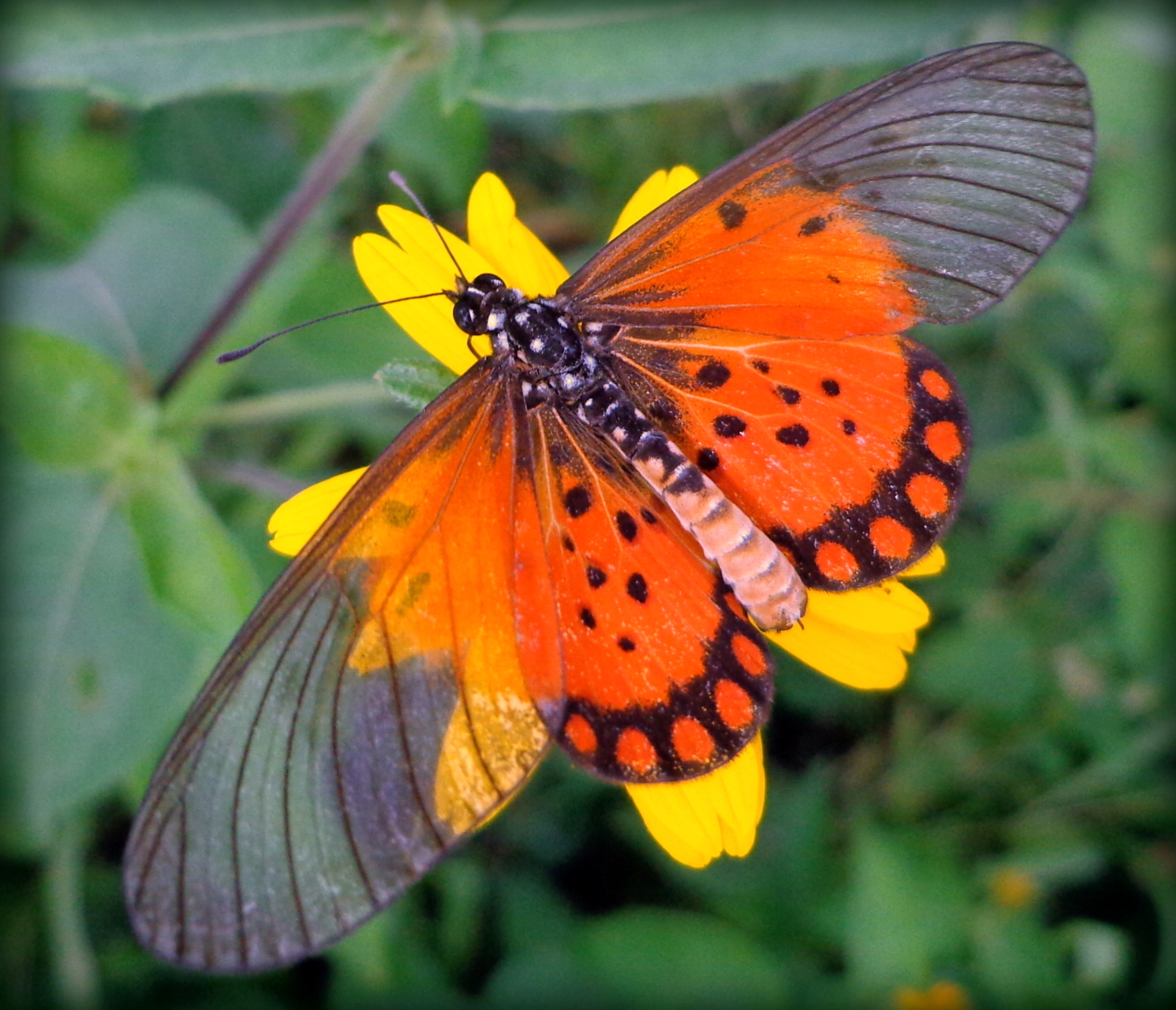

Scientific classification
- Kingdom: Animalia
- Phylum: Arthropoda
- Class: Insecta
- Order: Lepidoptera
- Family: Nymphalidae
- Genus: Acraea
- Species: A. boopis

Binomial name
- Acraea boopis Wichgraf, 1914

Synonyms
- Acraea admatha f. boopis Wichgraf, 1914

= Acraea boopis =

Species of butterfly

Acraea boopis, the rainforest acraea, is a butterfly of the family Nymphalidae. It is found in KwaZulu-Natal, Eswatini, from Mozambique to Kenya and in Tanzania.

The wingspan is 45–52 mm for males and 49–58 mm for females. Adults are on wing year round, with peaks from November to March in southern Africa.

The larvae feed on Celastraceae species, including Cassine tetragonal, Maytenus acuminate, Maytenus heterophylla and Rawsonia lucida.

== Subspecies ==
- Acraea boopis boopis (South Africa in Afromontane and higher lowland forest in Eastern Cape, then along the escarpment through KwaZulu-Natal, also in Mpumalanga and Limpopo)
- Acraea boopis ama Pierre, 1979 (Kenya, northern Tanzania)
- Acraea boopis choloui Pierre, 1979 (Malawi) May be a full species.

== Taxonomy ==
It is a member of the Acraea terpsicore species group - but see also Pierre & Bernaud, 2014
