= Ambulyx ceramensis =

Scientific classification
- Kingdom: Animalia
- Phylum: Arthropoda
- Class: Insecta
- Order: Lepidoptera
- Family: Sphingidae
- Genus: Ambulyx
- Species: A. ceramensis

Binomial name
- Ambulyx ceramensis (Joicey & Talbot, 1921)

Synonyms
- Oxyambulyx ceramensis Joicey & Talbot, 1921

Species of moth

Ambulyx ceramensis is a species of moth in the family Sphingidae. It was described by James John Joicey and George Talbot in 1921 and is known from Indonesia.
