= Heinrich Riffarth =

German entomologist

Heinrich H. Riffarth (1860 – 21 January 1908) was a German entomologist who specialised in Lepidoptera.

He was an entrepreneur. The Riffarth collection of Heliconiidae was sold to James John Joicey, his Agrias specimens were sold to the Natural History Museum at Tring. The remaining exotic butterflies went to Hermann Rolle.

== Works ==
Publications include:

- Riffarth, H. 1901 Die Gattung Heliconius Latr.: Neu bearbeitet und Beschreibung neuer Formen. Berl. Entomol. Zeit. 46, 25–183.
- with Hans Stichel Das Tierreich 22 : Lepidoptera, Heliconiidae. Berlin : Friedländer, 1905.
