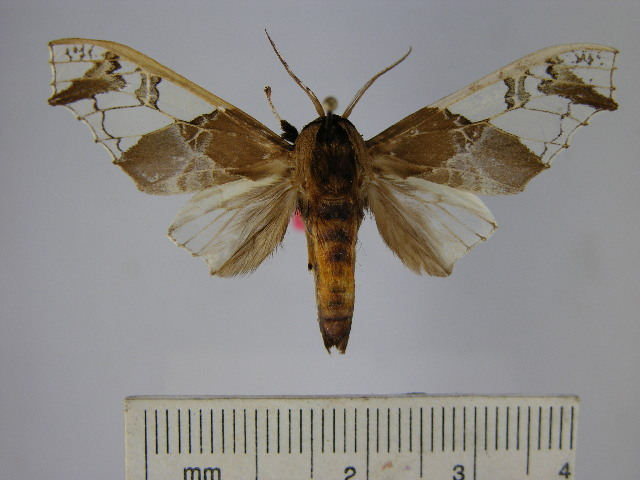
- Parathyris semivitrea

Scientific classification
- Kingdom: Animalia
- Phylum: Arthropoda
- Clade: Pancrustacea
- Class: Insecta
- Order: Lepidoptera
- Superfamily: Noctuoidea
- Family: Erebidae
- Subfamily: Arctiinae
- Subtribe: Phaegopterina
- Genus: Parathyris; Hübner, [1819]

Synonyms
- Thyrarctia Hampson, 1901

= Parathyris =

Genus of moths

Parathyris is a genus of moths in the family Erebidae.

== Species ==
- Parathyris cedonulli
- Parathyris semivitrea
