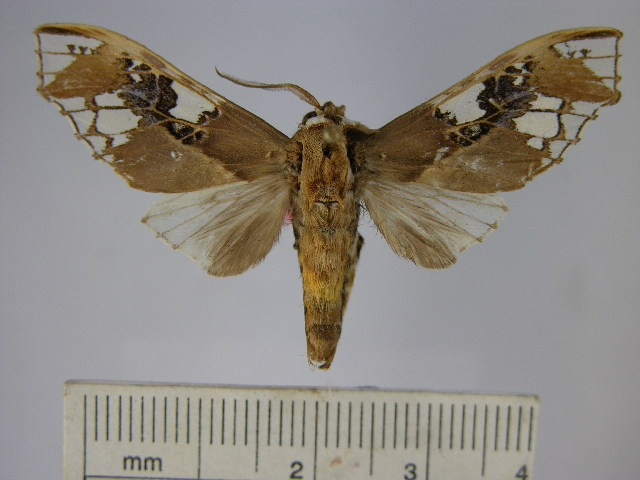
- Parathyris cedonulli cedonulli
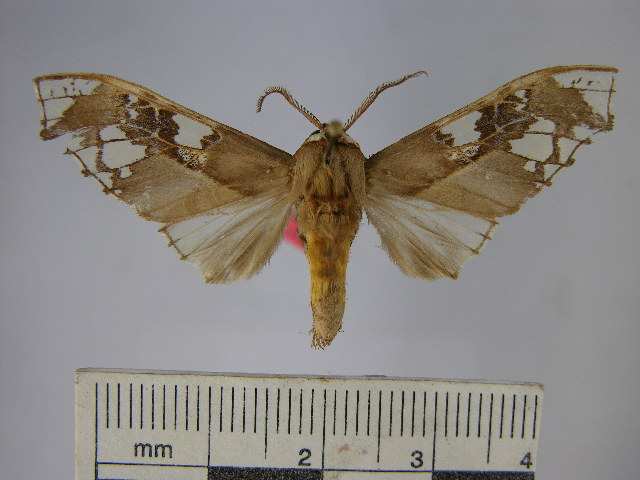
- Parathyris cedonulli griseata

Scientific classification
- Domain: Eukaryota
- Kingdom: Animalia
- Phylum: Arthropoda
- Class: Insecta
- Order: Lepidoptera
- Superfamily: Noctuoidea
- Family: Erebidae
- Subfamily: Arctiinae
- Genus: Parathyris
- Species: P. cedonulli

Binomial name
- Parathyris cedonulli (Stoll, 1781)

Synonyms
- Phalaena cedonulli Stoll, 1781; Bombyx cedo-nulli Stoll, 1782; Thyrarctia cedo-nulli griseata Rothschild, 1935

= Parathyris cedonulli =

Species of moth

Parathyris cedonulli is a moth of the family Erebidae first described by Caspar Stoll in 1781. It is found in French Guiana, Suriname, Brazil, Venezuela, Ecuador, Bolivia, Honduras and Belize.

== Subspecies ==
- Parathyris cedonulli cedonulli
- Parathyris cedonulli griseata (Rothschild, 1935) (Belize)
