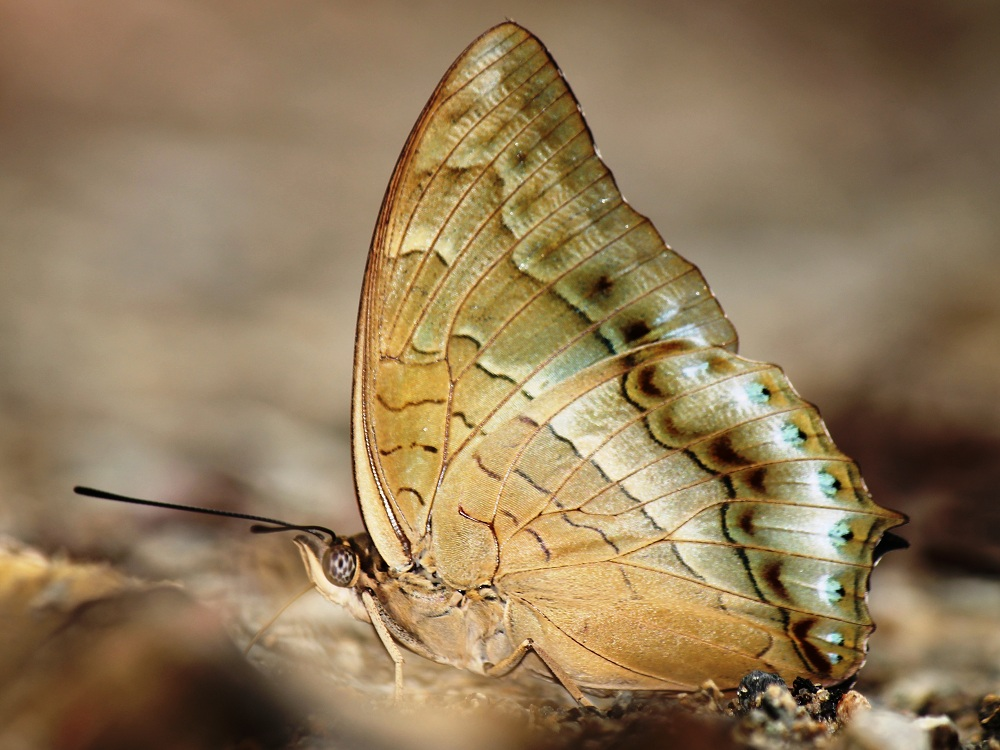

Scientific classification
- Domain: Eukaryota
- Kingdom: Animalia
- Phylum: Arthropoda
- Class: Insecta
- Order: Lepidoptera
- Family: Nymphalidae
- Genus: Charaxes
- Species: C. nitebis

Binomial name
- Charaxes nitebis (Hewitson, 1859)

Synonyms
- Nymphalis nitebis Hewitson, 1859

= Charaxes nitebis =

Species of butterfly

Charaxes nitebis, the green rajah, is a butterfly in the family Nymphalidae. It was described by William Chapman Hewitson in 1859. It is found in the Indomalayan realm.

== Technical description ==
male Body above raw umber colour, thorax somewhat olivaceous green : underside creamy buff, sides of sterna somewhat darker. Wings above black, basal half of forewing and basal two-thirds of hindwing (abdominal fold excepted) covered with creamy scaling which appears creamy olive buff where both upper and under layer are pale, as is the case from base of M2 of forewing to near outer edge of pale area, and anteriorly on disc of hindwing, while the remainder of the pale area is greenish olive buff owing to the under layer of scales being black.

Forewing : olive buff area reaching anteriorly just to upper angle of cell, but there is an olive creamy buff patch beyond apex of cell between R1 and R2 generally divided by the black median bar R1-R2 and separated from the area only by the black bar D, outer edge of area sinuate between veins R3 and M2, less so between M2 and SM2, oblique, crossing M2 about 11 mm. from edge of wing and reaching internal margin to 8 mm. from posterior angle; median bars R3-M1 sometimes marked, separating from the area a rather thin lunule, bar M1-M2 sometimes vestigial; two discal and a series of postdiscal spots creamy olive buff : discal spots between SC5 and R2 2 to 4 mm. long, separated from each other, about 8 to 9 mm. from upper angle of cell; postdiscal spots smaller, the series concave from R2-M2, spot R1-R2 a little more proximal than the next, spot SC5-R1 sometimes vestigial, spots M2-SM2 not seldom absent, spot R1-R2 7 mm. from outer margin.

Hindwing : olive buff area extending costad beyond SC2, here the median bar C-SC2 generally marked and the cellule C-SC2 from base to median bar black, but mostly an olive buff stripe along SC2, at outer side of the bar the pale colour forms generally a triangular patch that reaches C and is separated from the rest of the area only by the more or less obviously black vein SC2, bar SC2-R1 seldom marked; abdominal region up to M and M2 raw umber colour, middle and base of fold somewhat whitish; black outer marginal area widest in front, measuring at SC2 about 12 to 15 mm., the olive buff scaling extends distad along veins R3-M2 and reaches, at M1 and M2 often the admarginal spots; submarginal white dots minute, the second the largest; admarginal interspaces occupied by greenish olive buff spots, which are widely separated from one another, are externally straight or slightly convex, proximally triangularly dilated at ends, and are often divided at the internervular folds into triangular spots; last spots more or less shaded with yellow; between these spots and the white dots there are the submarginal black dots, which are generally deeper black than the remainder of the black outer area. Underside buffish wood-brown, discal interspaces creamy white at median bars, outer marginal area down to discal, luniform, bars slightly washed with wax-yellow; bars in basal half somewhat olive, not deep black.

Forewing : median bars R3-SM2 continuous or nearly so, bar R2-R3 closer to cell, bars SC5-R2 about midway between cell and discal series of bars; the latter concave from R1-M1, the upper two more proximal than bar R1-R2; discal interspaces R3-M2 much wider than the median interspaces; postdiscal spots light chestnut with an olivaceous tint. spots M2-SM2 well marked, the others gradually fading away as one approaches the costal margin, the spots separated from the discal bars by thin pale wood-brown interspaces; black submarginal dots more or less faintly vestigial, white scaling between the postdiscal and submarginal spots obvious at apical and posterior angles of wing. Hind wing : costal subbasal bar (at outer side of PC absent; median bars almost continuous, forming a slightly convex line from costal to abdominal margin, bars M2-SM2, though broken twice, much more regular than in the tawny Charaxes; submedian series of bars stops generally at (SM1), but sometimes bar (SM1)—SM2 is marked, forming an acute angle with bar M-(SM1); discal interspaces C-R3 wider than median ones; postdiscal spots of the same colour as on forewing, more or less halfmoon-shaped, spot SC2-R1 more or less obsolete, spot R1-R2 the heaviest; the white and the black submarginal dots separated by blue or greyish blue scaling, black dot C-SC2 absent or vestigial; admarginal interspaces pale buff-yellow, separated at veins, nearly straight outwardly; admarginal brown line thin; edge of wing washed with brown and ochraceous; upper tail 3 to 5 mm. long, second a very short tooth.

female. Body above tawny olive, hairs on thorax somewhat olivaceous green; underside cream colour. Wings above olive tawny, sometimes rather darker brown, apical two-thirds of forewing brownish black. Forewing : the black bars not defined owing to the outer two-thirds of the wing being suffused with black, but their position indicated by creamy white or somewhat buffish markings which occupy part of the discal and post-discal interspaces; the series of discal markings consists of seven spots, of which spots R3-M2 are strongly arched, spot SC5-R1 generally preceded by a creamy white dash, occasionally there are some creamy scales near upper angle of cell between SC4/5and R2; post-discal spots SC4-SM2 placed like postdiscal interspaces of the underside, spot SC4-SC5 often obsolete, the two submedian ones fused, occasionally rather obscurely marked, posterior spots larger than anterior ones; posterior admarginal interspaces sometimes marked as ill-defined buffish or russet spots. Hindwing : median bars C-R1 fused with the purplish black area that extends from these bars to base and gradually fades away into the olive-tawny colour of the disc; two creamy white patches at outer side of these bars, often washed over with brown, followed sometimes by some whitish scaling behind R1; post-discosubmarginal black patches C-R1 extended basad to discal creamy patches, but patch SC2-R1 only so along SC2, patches R1-M2 more or less incompletely isolated, longer than broad, their submarginal portions deep black, patches M2-SM2 isolated; white submarginal dots large; admarginal interspaces shaped as in male, of the colour of the disc or paler; admarginal line dark brown. Underside as in male, somewhat paler, the white patches in discal interspaces larger; tail as in male, somewhat broader. Length of forewing : male, 40–44 mm. female, 44—to mm.

== Subspecies ==
- C. n. nitebis (North Sulawesi)
- C. n. sulaensis Rothschild, 1900 (Sula Island, Banggai)
- C. n. luscius Fruhstorfer, 1914 (South Sulawesi)
