= Fritz Ludwig Otto Wichgraf =

German entomologist (1853–?)

Fritz Ludwig Otto Wichgraf (born 9 May 1853) was a German entomologist.

Wichgraf's Lepidoptera collection was purchased by James John Joicey. His collections of Acraea, Lasiocampidae and Bombycidae are in the Natural History Museum, London.

- Wichgraf, F. (1909) Beschreibung neuer Formen der Gattung Acraea F. aus Rhodesia, Mashunaland und Angola. Berliner Entomologische Zeitschrift 53:240-247.
- Wichgraf, F. (1911) Einige neue afrikanische Lepidopteren. Internationale Entomologische Zeitschrift 5:173-175.
- Wichgraf, F. (1913) Eine neue athiopische Limacodide und anders. Internationale Entomologische Zeitschrift 7:9-10; 13-14; 21-22.
- Wichgraf, F. (1914) Neues aus der afrikanischen Lepidopteren-Fauna. Deutsche Entomologische Zeitung 1914:345-353.
- Wichgraf, F. (1918) Neue afrikanische Lepidopteren. Internationale Entomologische Zeitschrift 12:26-30.
- Wichgraf, F. (1921) Neue afrikanische Lepidopteren aus der Ertlschen Sammlung. Internationale Entomologische Zeitschrift 14:171-172; 179-180; 195-197.
- Berl. ent. Z. online.
