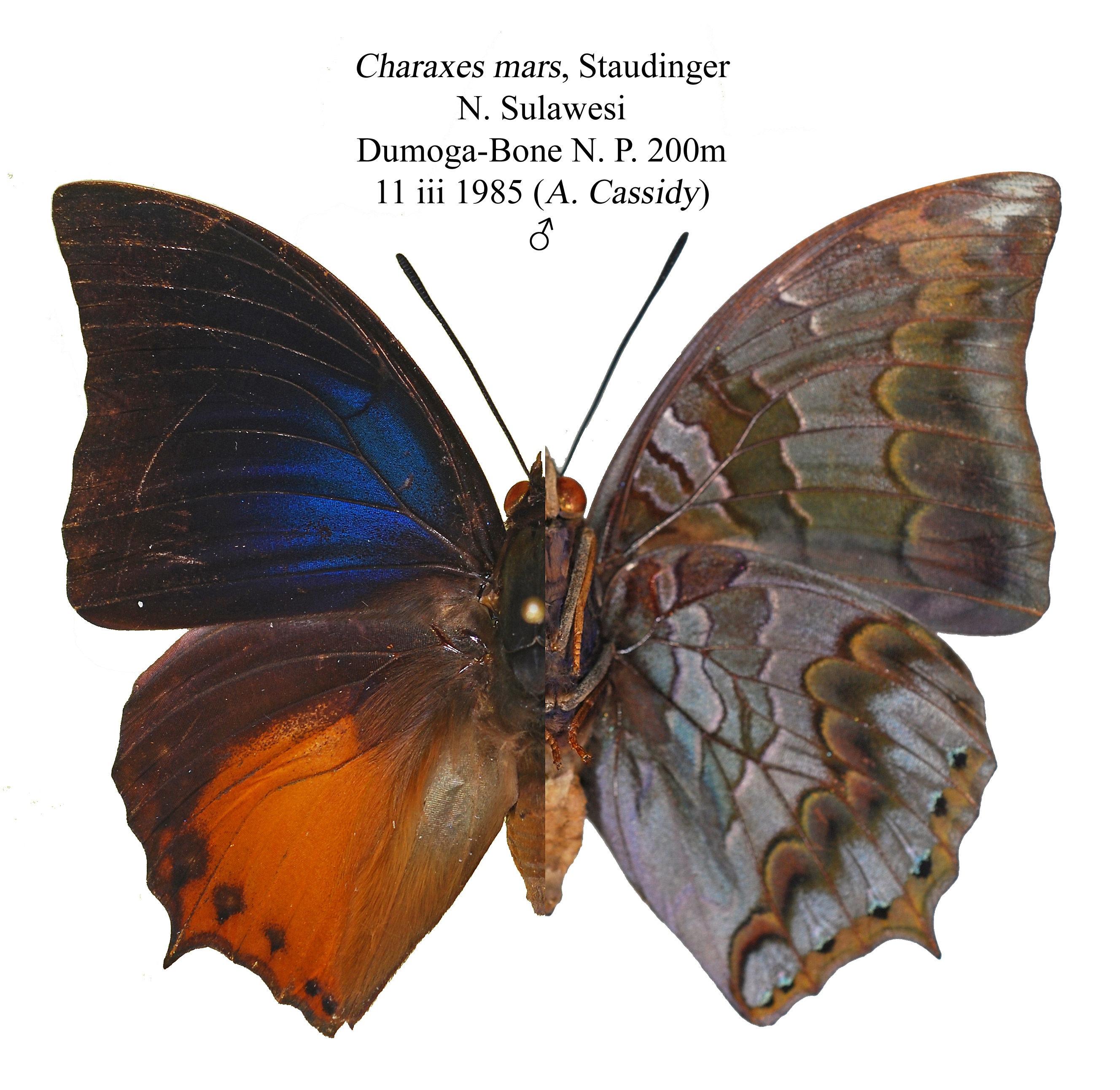
- Male
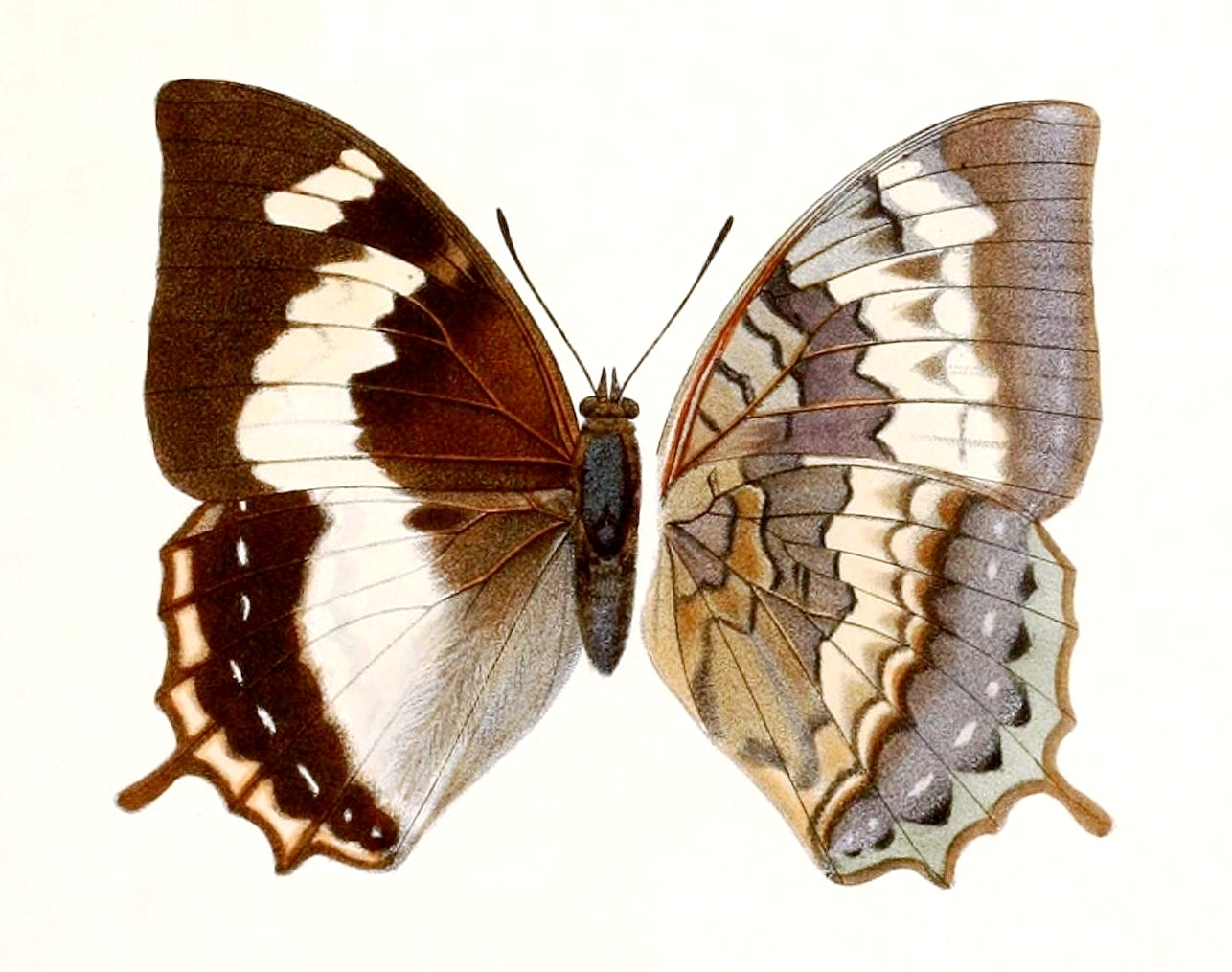
- Female C. m. madensis

Scientific classification
- Domain: Eukaryota
- Kingdom: Animalia
- Phylum: Arthropoda
- Class: Insecta
- Order: Lepidoptera
- Family: Nymphalidae
- Genus: Charaxes
- Species: C. mars

Binomial name
- Charaxes mars Staudinger, 1885

Synonyms
- Charaxes mars var. dohertyi Rothschild, 1892; Charaxes madensis Rothschild, 1899

= Charaxes mars =

Iron rajah

Species of butterfly

Charaxes mars, the iron rajah, is a butterfly of the rajahs and nawabs group, i.e. the Charaxinae group of the brush-footed butterflies family. It is endemic to Sulawesi in central Indonesia. Charaxes mars is a large butterfly with forewings with concave outer edge and hindwings each with a tail. The upper side of the forewings is dark blue and light in the basal part. The hindwings are orange with a submarginal line of dark brown ocelli.

== Technical description ==
male Tawny colour of upperside of hindwing not reaching in front of R1; black postdisco-submarginal patches all fused together (except dots M2S-M2), patch M1-M2 elongate, vein R3 and outer half of M1 black, tawny admarginal interspaces SC2- R2 faintly indicated; tail shorter than in mars dohertyifemale Unknown. madensis male Unknown. Most likely resembling that of Ch. mars.

female. Allied to Ch.mars. Upperside Forewing: blackish brown, no blue tone, white discal band broader than Ch. mars.

== Races ==
- Charaxes mars mars (northern Sulawesi)
- Charaxes mars dohertyi Rothschild, 1892 (southern Sulawesi)
- Charaxes mars madensis Rothschild, 1899 (Buru)
