= James John Joicey =

English amateur entomologist (1870–1932)

James John Joicey FRGS FLS FZS FES FRHS
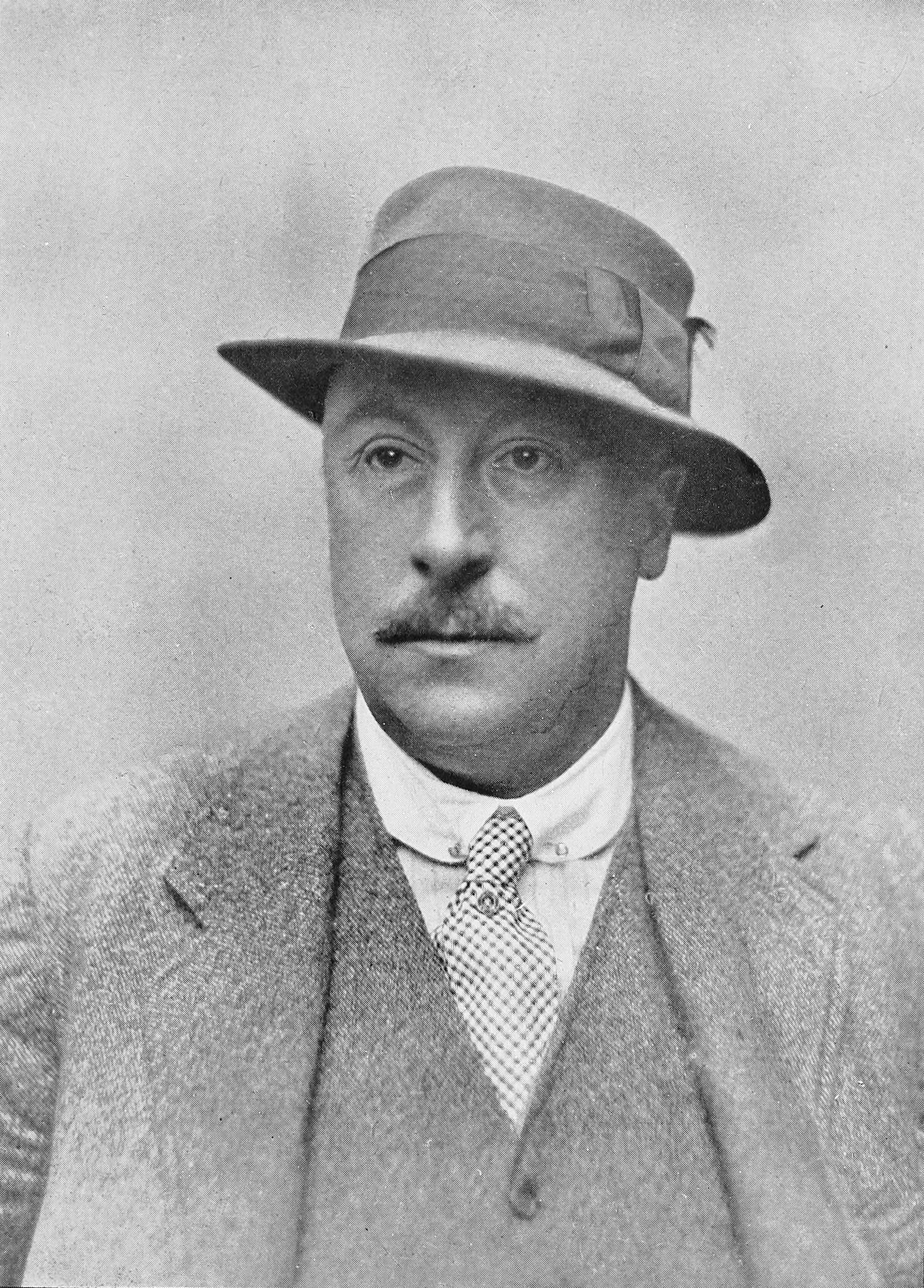
- Born: 28 December 1870; Newcastle upon Tyne, England
- Died: 10 March 1932 (aged 61); The Hill, Witley, Surrey, England
- Burial place: Holy Trinity Church, Sunningdale
- Occupation: Amateur entomologist
- Known for: Assembling a collection of over 1.5 million Lepidoptera specimens, his Hill Museum research output, and his presentations from his collection to the Natural History Museum
- Notable work: The Bulletin of the Hill Museum 1921–1932
- Spouse: Maud Muriel Fisher (m. 1896)
- Relatives: 1st Baron Joicey (father's cousin)

James John Joicey FES (28 December 1870 – 10 March 1932) was an English amateur entomologist, who assembled an extensive collection of Lepidoptera in his private research museum, called the Hill Museum, in Witley, Surrey. His collection, 40 years in the making, was considered to have been the second largest in the world held privately and to have numbered over 1.5 million specimens. Joicey was a fellow of the Zoological Society of London, the Royal Geographical Society, the Royal Entomological Society, the Royal Horticultural Society, and the Linnean Society of London.

Joicey employed specialist entomologists including George Talbot to curate his collection and financed numerous expeditions throughout the world to obtain previously unknown varieties. More than 190 scientific articles were produced during the active period of the Hill Museum. This body of research was described as "a contribution to the study of the exotic Lepidoptera of very great scientific value".

Joicey's donations from his collection, made during his life and continuing after his death, contributed significantly to the Lepidoptera collection of the Natural History Museum in London. Joicey's obituary in The Entomologist described him as "undoubtedly the most lavish patron of Entomology, in so far as butterflies and moths are concerned, that this country has ever boasted".

== Life ==
=== Background ===
James John Joicey was born on 28 December 1870 in Newcastle upon Tyne, the only child of Major William James Joicey, a wealthy coal owner, and Mary Anne Joicey née Clark. He was educated at Aysgarth School, Yorkshire, and Hertford College, Oxford, and was an Associate Member of the Institute of Mining Engineers from 1891. He was also a member of the Junior Carlton Club.

Joicey married Maud Muriel Fisher (later Baroness de Satgé) in London in 1896. He lived at The Hill in Witley, Surrey, from about 1912. (Note: The 1911 Census of England shows another family living at The Hill in April 1911 and Joicey had notified the Institute of Mining Engineers of his address at The Hill by August 1912. He is listed in London electoral registers from 1920 to 1925 at Marble Arch as Admiral Joicey.)

=== Collecting ===
Joicey's boyhood interest in insects was encouraged by his parents, and at the age of sixteen he put together a small collection of British and foreign butterflies. As an adult, he rediscovered his boyhood collection and was inspired to start collecting in earnest, his active interest dating from 1906. He used his resources to "indulge a taste for collecting butterflies and moths which remained with him throughout his life". He travelled "in the East" as a young man. Although he employed experts to collect most of his specimens, he also collected "on his own account both here and abroad", in "Europe, India, China, Japan, Burma and America". In 1913, he built and financed a private research museum, the Hill Museum, at his home in Witley, employing a curator and seven assistants. In one twelve-month period he collected some 17,000 specimens from across the world and was spending up to £10,000 (approximately equivalent to £600,000 in 2023) a year on the collection. Joicey said,

How did I manage to spend £10,000 a year on this collection? Well, these did not come from my back garden. I have had to send collectors to the far ends of the earth. ... When my work is done – that is, when I die – I will present the collection to the nation.

The work has been the ruling passion of my life, ... I don't think I am extravagant, as my researches and investigations will be of great value to the nation.

Joicey became a fellow of the Zoological Society of London in 1890, a fellow of the Royal Geographical Society in 1903, a fellow of the Entomological Society in 1908 (council member 1920–1923), a fellow of the Royal Horticultural Society in 1912, a fellow of the Linnean Society of London in 1913, a life member of the Société entomologique de France in 1921, and a member of the London Natural History Society in 1928.

Joicey was also an amateur orchidist, and exhibited at meetings of the Royal Horticultural Society.

=== Finances ===
Joicey could afford to build his collection of Lepidoptera through his family connection with the firm of "Messrs. James Joicey & Co., Ltd, coalowners, Newcastle", founded by his grandfather. Although described as having been "nominally on the Stock Exchange from 1896 to 1899", then, in 1901, as a "coal owner & ship owner", and, in 1913, as a director of the family coal mining firm, Joicey effectively had no occupation and throughout his life relied on allowances from his parents. His income proved insufficient for his "extravagance in living" and the interest rates charged by money-lenders. Joicey became bankrupt in 1909 with a deficiency of over £185,000 (approximately equivalent to £24,400,000 in 2023), and again in 1922 with a deficiency of over £430,000 (approximately equivalent to £29,700,000 in 2023) despite his mother having given him £300,000 (approximately equivalent to £16,800,000 in 2023) in the interim. The latter bankruptcy was discharged in October 1931.

The son of a millionaire, for him money meant only one thing – more butterflies, still rarer specimens than he had already.

— George Talbot, Joicey's head curator, 1932

Joicey's father, at one time a millionaire, had left over £700,000 (approximately equivalent to £87,500,000 in 2023) in his estate in 1912, but his will ensured that no money went directly to his son. The Witley house and estate were bought for Joicey after his first bankruptcy. When sued by creditors in 1919, the judge said, "He seems hardly to have grown up. He seems to have infantile tastes which his mother helps him gratify." When counsel stated that Joicey was "susceptible to the wiles of the money-lenders", the judge responded, "And to the wiles of the butterflies." During the 1922 bankruptcy hearing, Joicey said, "I think the money seems to have gone like snow in an oven."

=== Death ===
Joicey's mother died in 1930, leaving an estate valued at over £300,000 (approximately equivalent to £24,000,000 in 2023). Towards the end of his life, Joicey became an invalid. He died of heart failure on 10 March 1932 at his home, The Hill, in Witley, Surrey, aged 61, and was buried at Holy Trinity Church, Sunningdale. Joicey's estate was valued at £1,151 (approximately equivalent to £100,900 in 2023), his collection and museum having been principally paid for and owned by his mother.

== Collections ==
The primary object of Mr. Joicey in making this collection of Lepidoptera is to advance in some way our scientific knowledge. ... The formation of a large collection has its value, because without access to plenty of material studies can only be incomplete and results are often erroneous. ...
No apology should be needed for amassing large collections ...

— George Talbot, 1924

As an adult, Joicey began collecting Lepidoptera in 1906 (Note: According to Miller, Joicey first competed with Walter Rothschild to build the world's premier orchid collection but when Joicey went bankrupt the judge made him promise to abandon collecting orchids. The details of the anecdote do not match Joicey's known bankruptcies and the story is uncorroborated.) and by 1908 was advertising as far away as Australia for:

Fresh-caught Specimens of Butterflies and Large Moths, in papers. Send Samples and state price per hundred.

He acquired the Henley Grose-Smith collection in 1910. Two years later he bought the Herbert Druce collection. To house his growing collection, he founded the Hill Museum at his Witley home in 1913. Joicey employed curators, including Alfred Noakes (from 1906) and George Talbot (from 1915), with a staff of assistants.

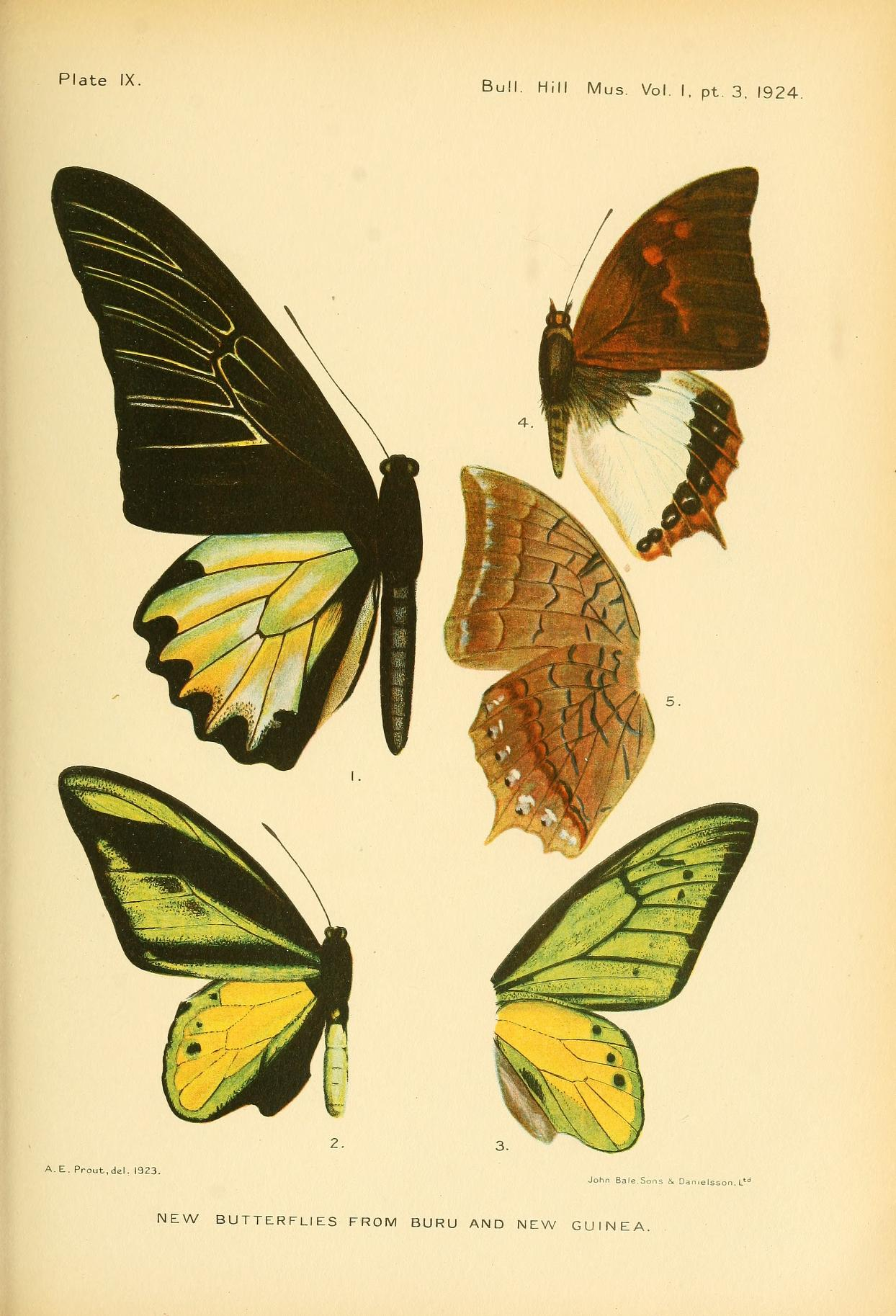
New butterflies from Buru and New Guinea (Joicey Collection). Top left: Troides prattorum. Top right: Charaxes madensis. Both were described by Talbot at The Hill to a reporter in 1932 shortly after Joicey's death.

Between 1913 and 1921 Joicey bought further collections: those of Ernst Suffert, c. 1913, Fritz Ludwig Otto Wichgraf, 1913, Col. Charles Swinhoe, 1916, Roland Trimen, 1917, Lt.-Col. C. G. Nurse, 1919, Hamilton Druce, 1919, Heinrich Riffarth, 1919, Henry John Elwes, 1920, and Paul Dognin, 1921. He added to these by sending special collectors to explore various regions on his behalf; for example, the Pratt family to South America and New Guinea, and T. A. Barns to Central Africa (Barns dedicated his 1922 book on the Eastern Congo to Joicey, his "friend and patron"). W. J. C. Frost, who visited the Islands of Tenimber, Am, Key, Misol, Obi and Sula during 1915–1918, donated his collection. Another collector, C. Talbot Bowring, sent many thousands of specimens from Hainan Island between 1918 and 1920.

In 1916, when granting Joicey's curator conditional exemption from military service, General Sir J. Wodehouse described the collection as "probably the finest of its kind in England", and Oxford professor E. B. Poulton wrote that "to leave the collection without a competent head would be a national disaster".

In 1919, the collection was valued at £50,000 (approximately equivalent to £2,900,000 in 2023). It consisted of 1.5 million specimens held in a room containing chests of drawers with "5000 compartments neatly arranged round the room, and in addition 4000 cases, all carefully labelled". It was reported that,

Here were butterflies of all sizes, of all colours – all arranged in an effective colour grouping. In one compartment were ... great winged beauties half a foot from wing tip to wing tip. In another were creatures so small that it needed a microscope to discern their beauty.

An annexe to the museum "over eighty feet long by twenty feet wide" (approximately 24 by 6 m) was built in 1920. In 1927 it was reported that the main building of the Museum was "as large as a dance hall. The specimens are kept in special cabinets stacked almost to the roof. Here, all day long, Mr. Joicey and his assistants ... work at arranging and naming the fresh arrivals." Some specimens dated from the 1830s, and others were from the Stanley expedition of 1871. Some were caught 1,000 miles (1,600 km) from land, others on the Alpine snowfields. They ranged in size from 1/2 inch to 10 inches (approximately 1 cm to 25 cm) wing spread. By 1930 the Hill Museum contained over 380,000 specimens.

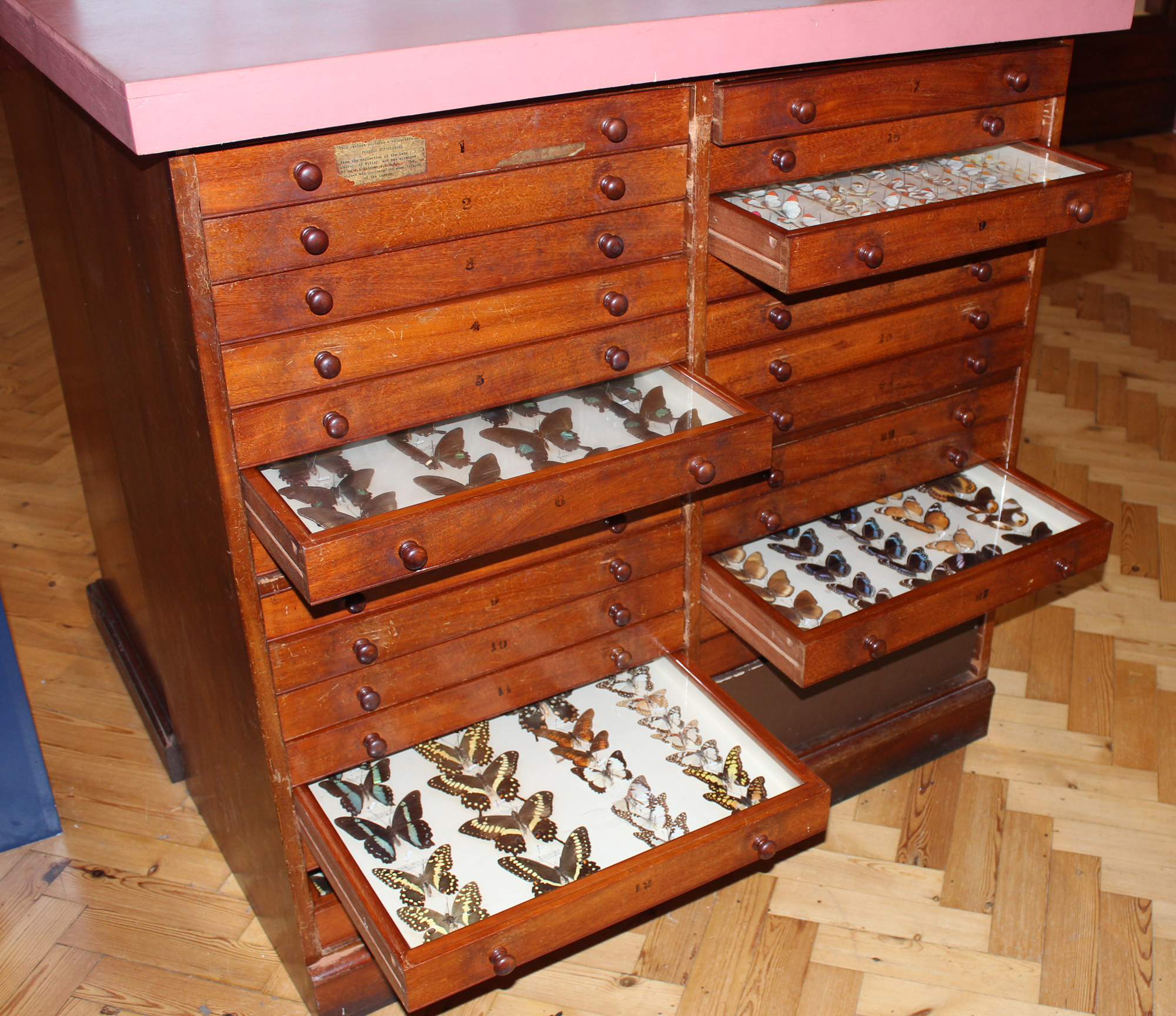
Butterflies from the Joicey collection in a contemporary cabinet at the Haslemere Educational Museum

Joicey and his Hill Museum colleagues published more than 190 scientific articles on world Lepidoptera and "produced some excellent work, especially on the Lepidoptera of New Guinea, Hainan Island, and Central and Eastern Africa". These include the four volumes of The Bulletin of the Hill Museum, 1921–1932, edited by Joicey and Talbot, and A Catalogue of the Type Specimens of Lepidoptera Rhopalocera in the Hill Museum, 1932, by Alfred George Gabriel.

During his lifetime, Joicey "presented to the Nation" between 200,000 and 300,000 Lepidoptera specimens including about 75,000 to the Natural History Museum. The latter figure included 15,500 moths and a number of butterflies (1923), his whole collection of over 30,000 Hesperiidae butterflies (1926), 6,000 Lymantriidae moths (1928), and, in 1931, a series of 800 type butterflies being "the most valuable, both scientifically and intrinsically ... received for the past two decades", some thousands of moths including over 600 type and paratype moths, and 1,500 butterflies including 750 type specimens. In 1932, the collection numbered over 500,000 specimens.

Shortly after Joicey's death in 1932 the Hill Museum was closed and the property sold by his mother's executors. Joicey's obituary in The Entomologist stated that,

The closing of the Hill Museum and the disbanding of its staff are events which will have serious repercussions throughout the ranks of lepidopterists in all parts of the world, and will definitely retard the advance of this science. In a comparatively short space of time Mr Joicey accomplished much for his favourite study.

The Hill Museum

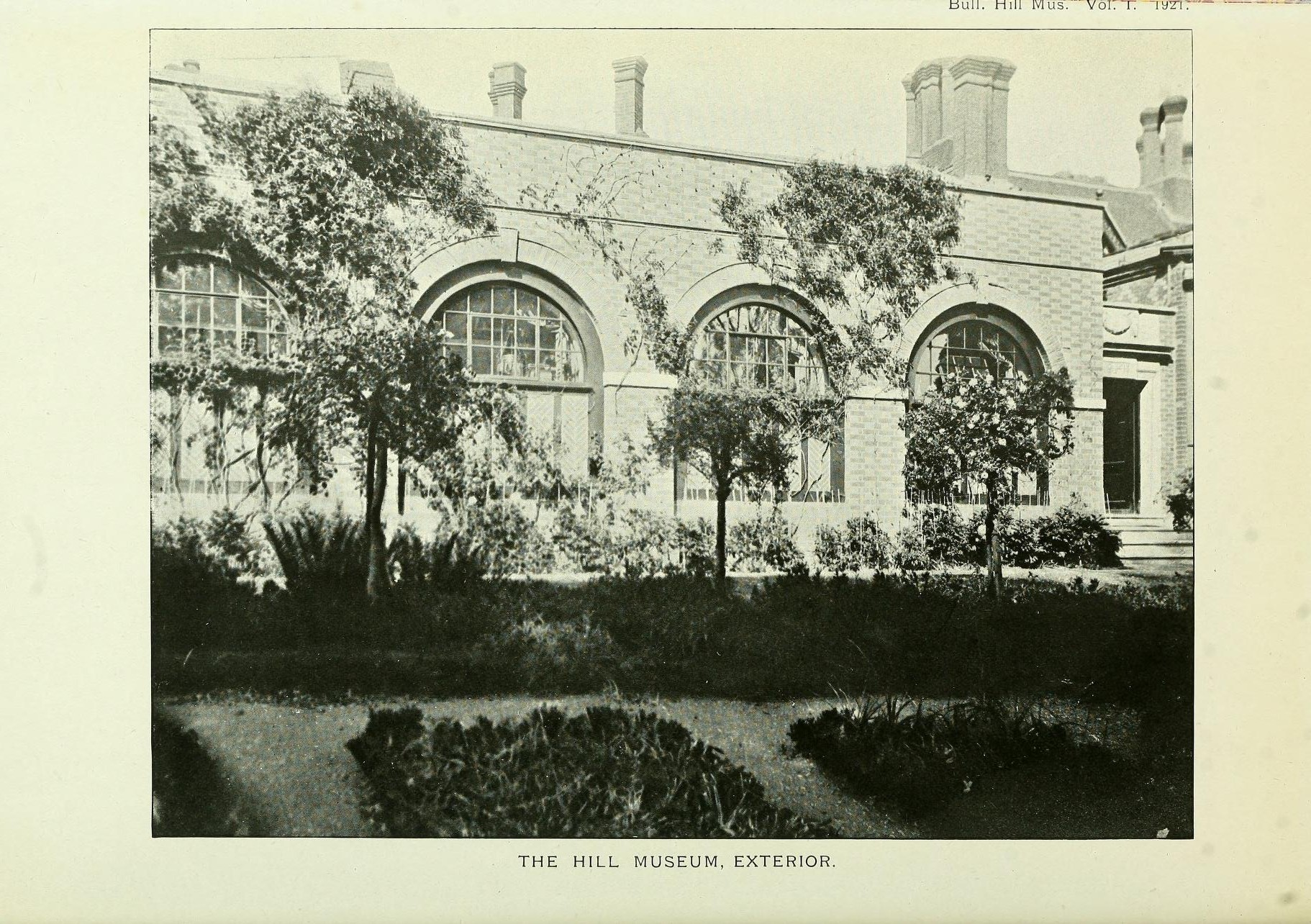
Hill Museum: Exterior

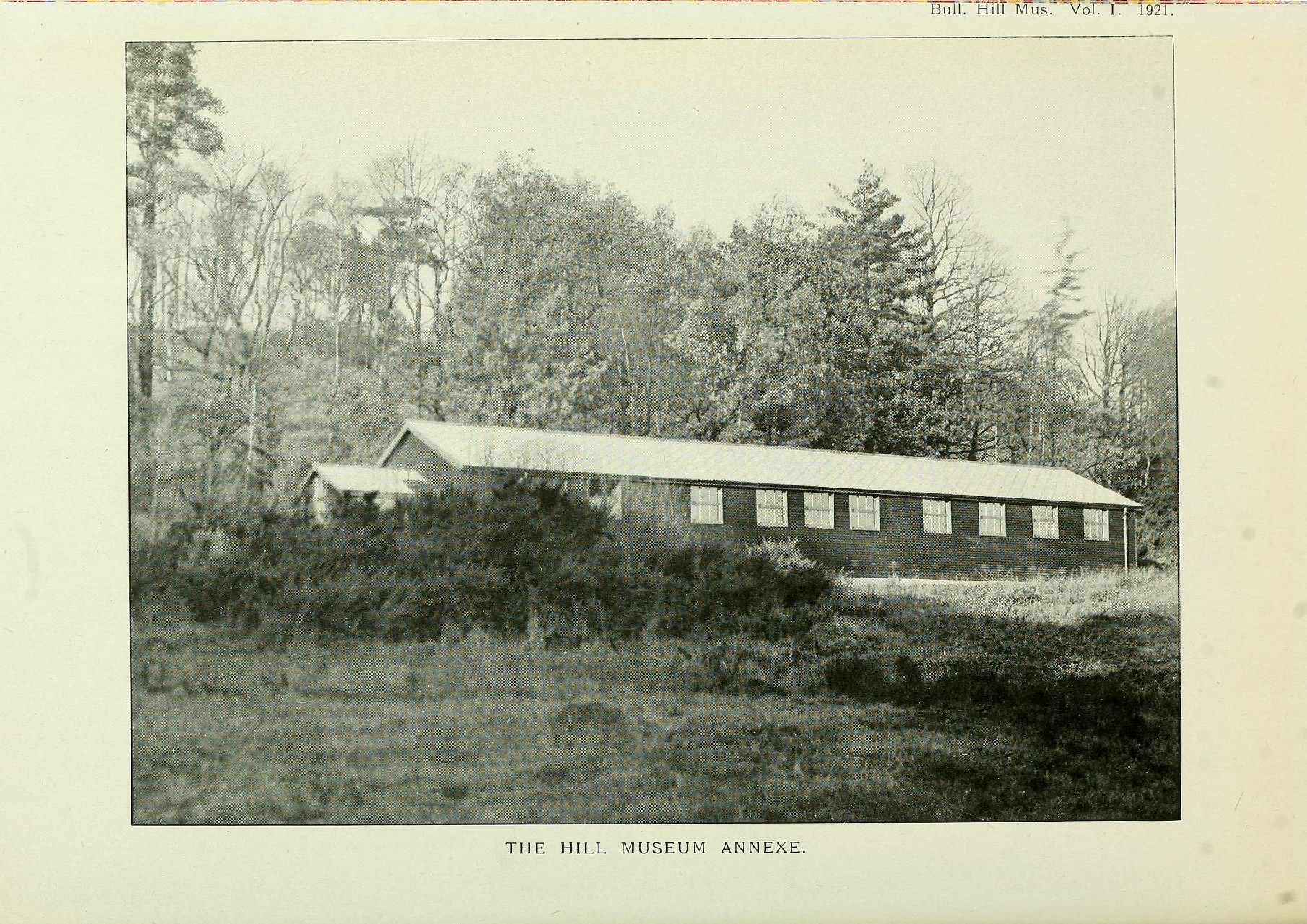
Hill Museum: Annexe

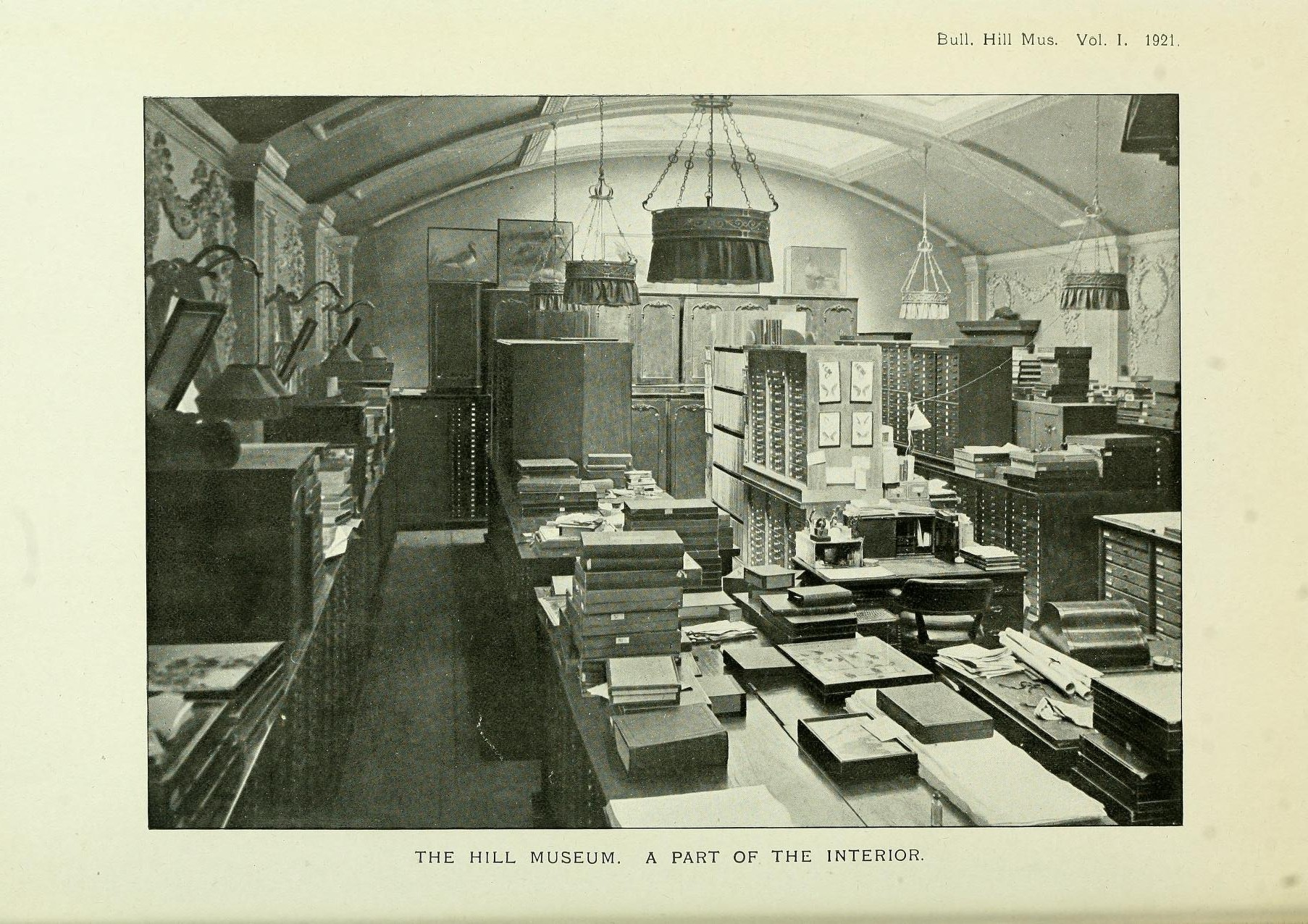
Hill Museum: A part of the interior

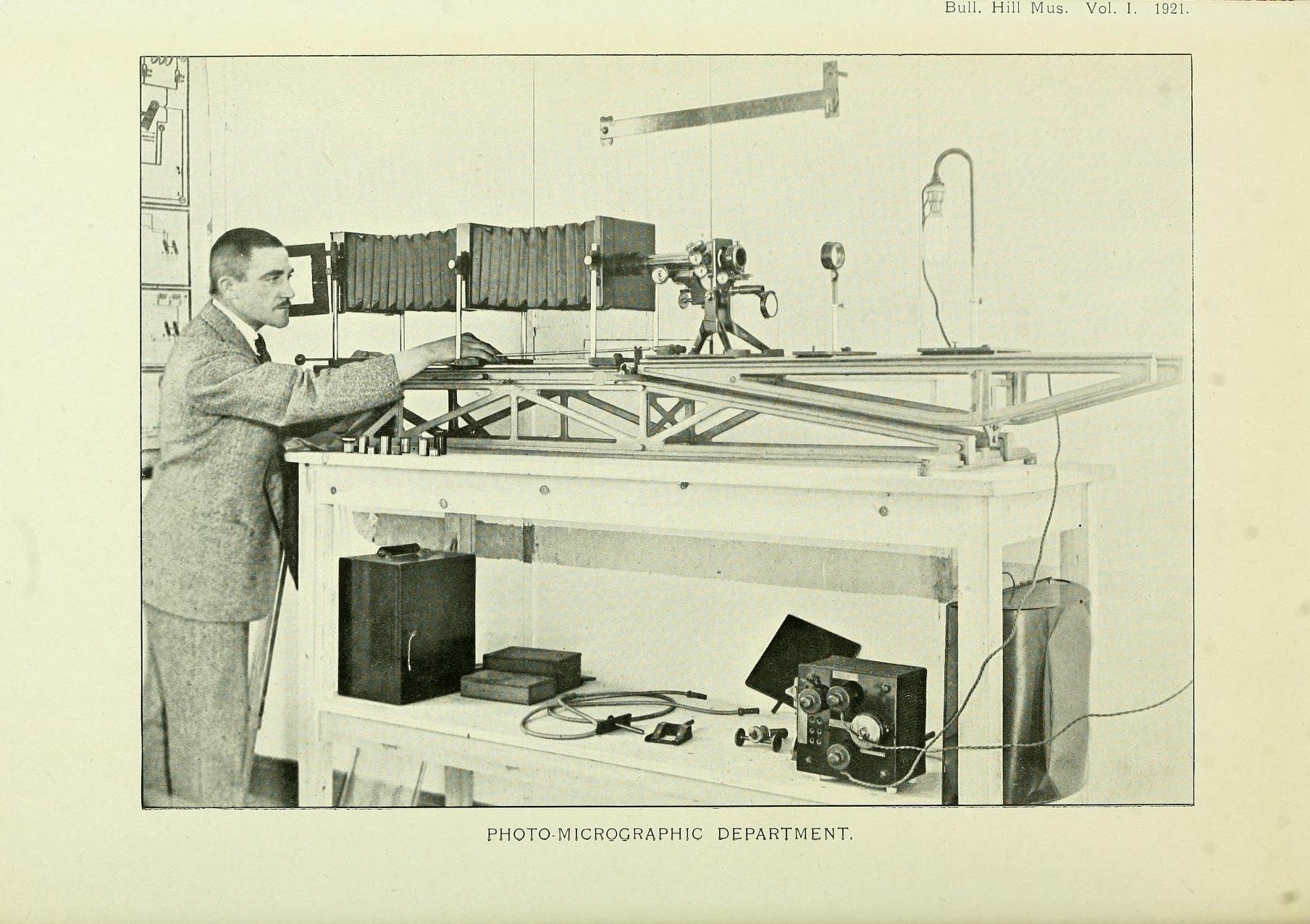
Hill Museum: Photomicrographic Department under Mr. H. J. Campbell

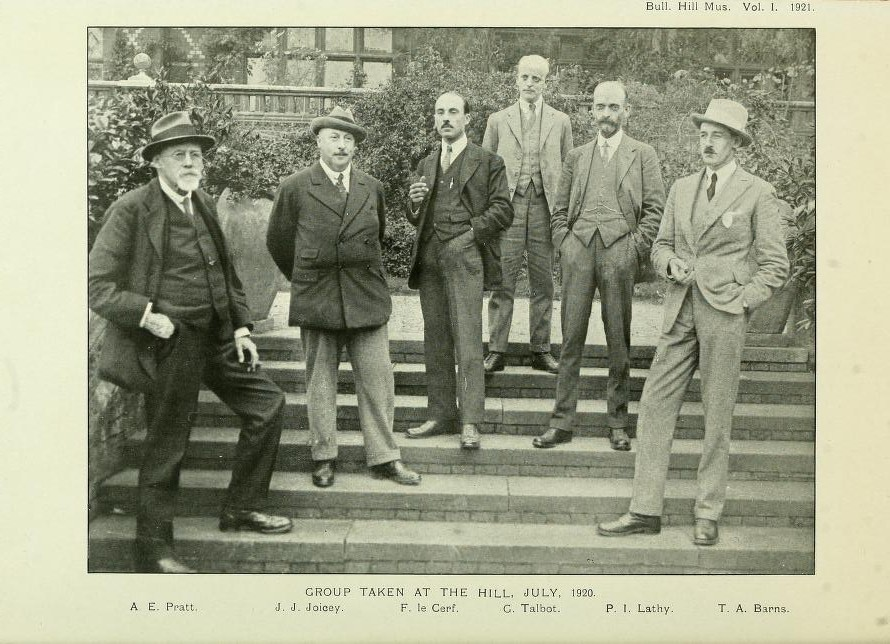
Joicey (second from left) and other entomologists at the Hill Museum in 1920
Joicey collection examples

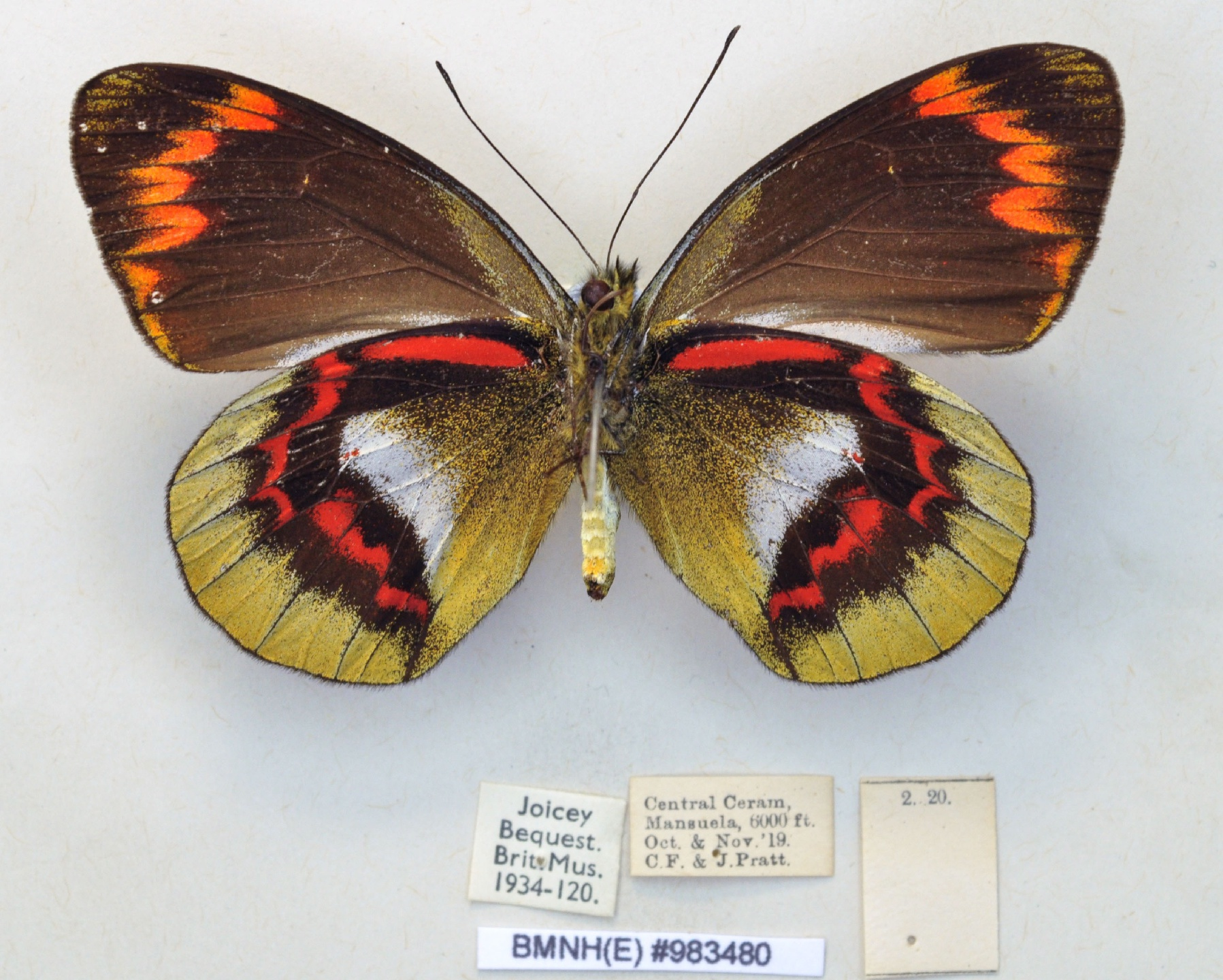
Delias joiceyi

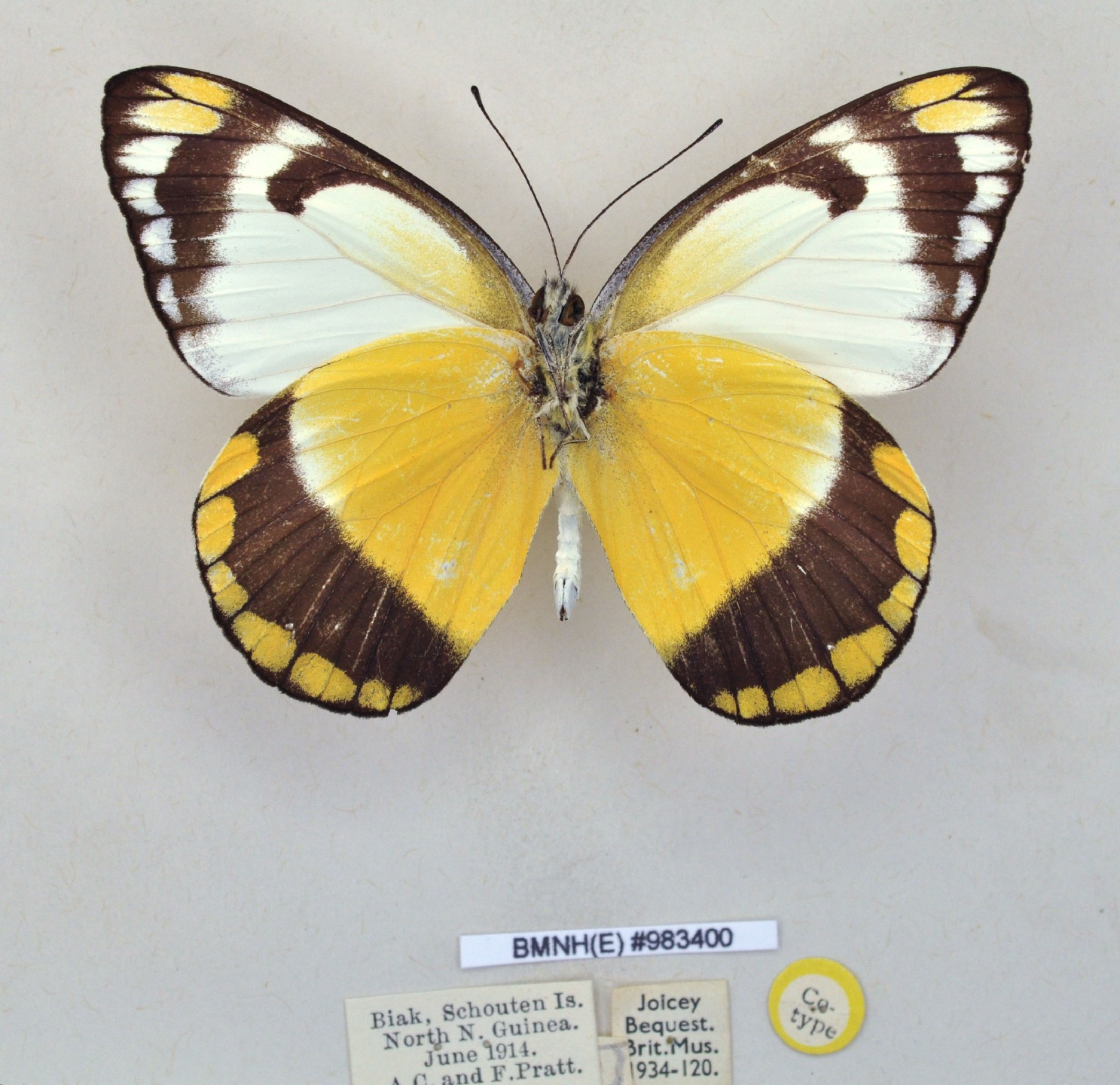
Delias maudei

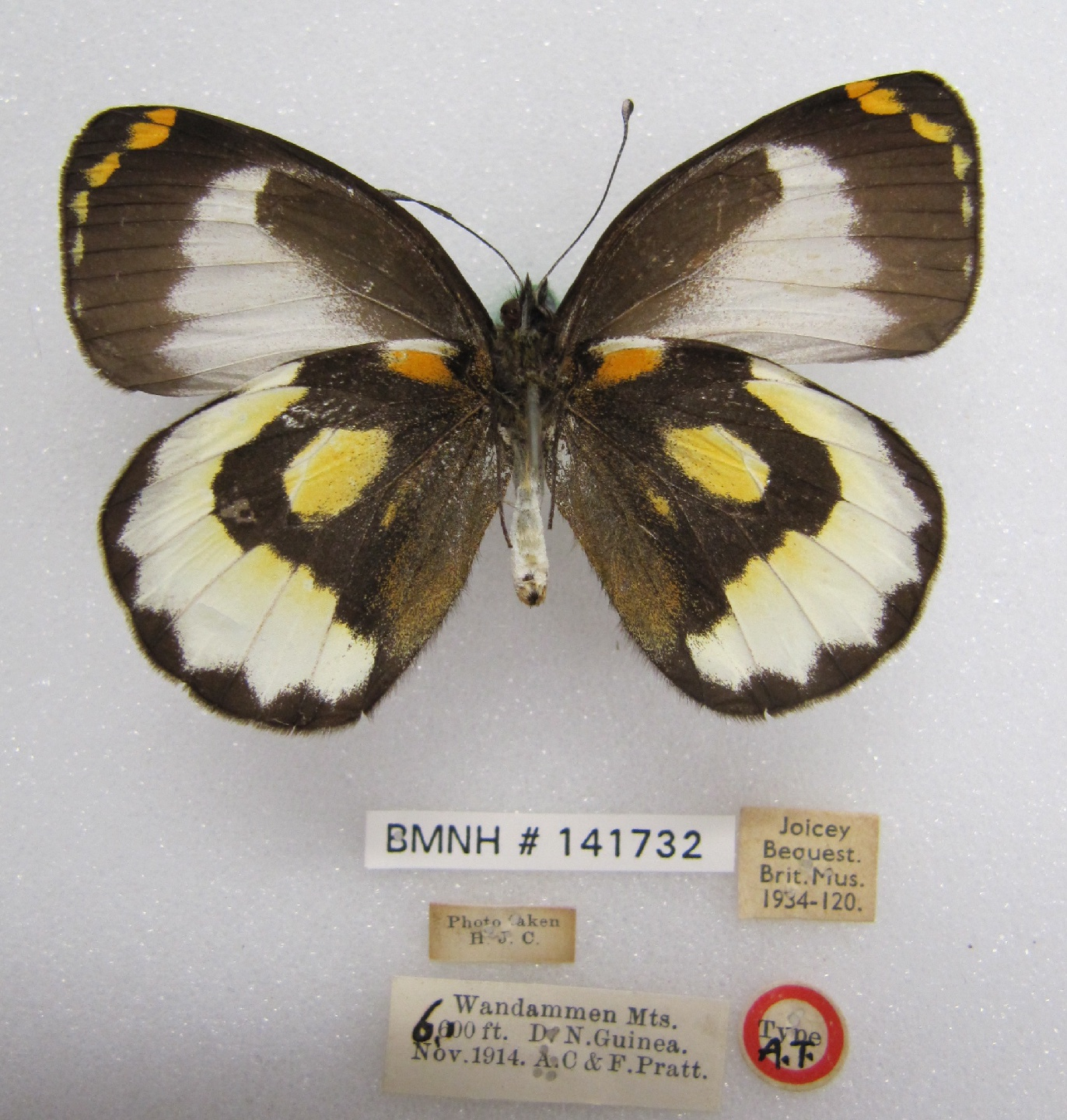
Delias mariae

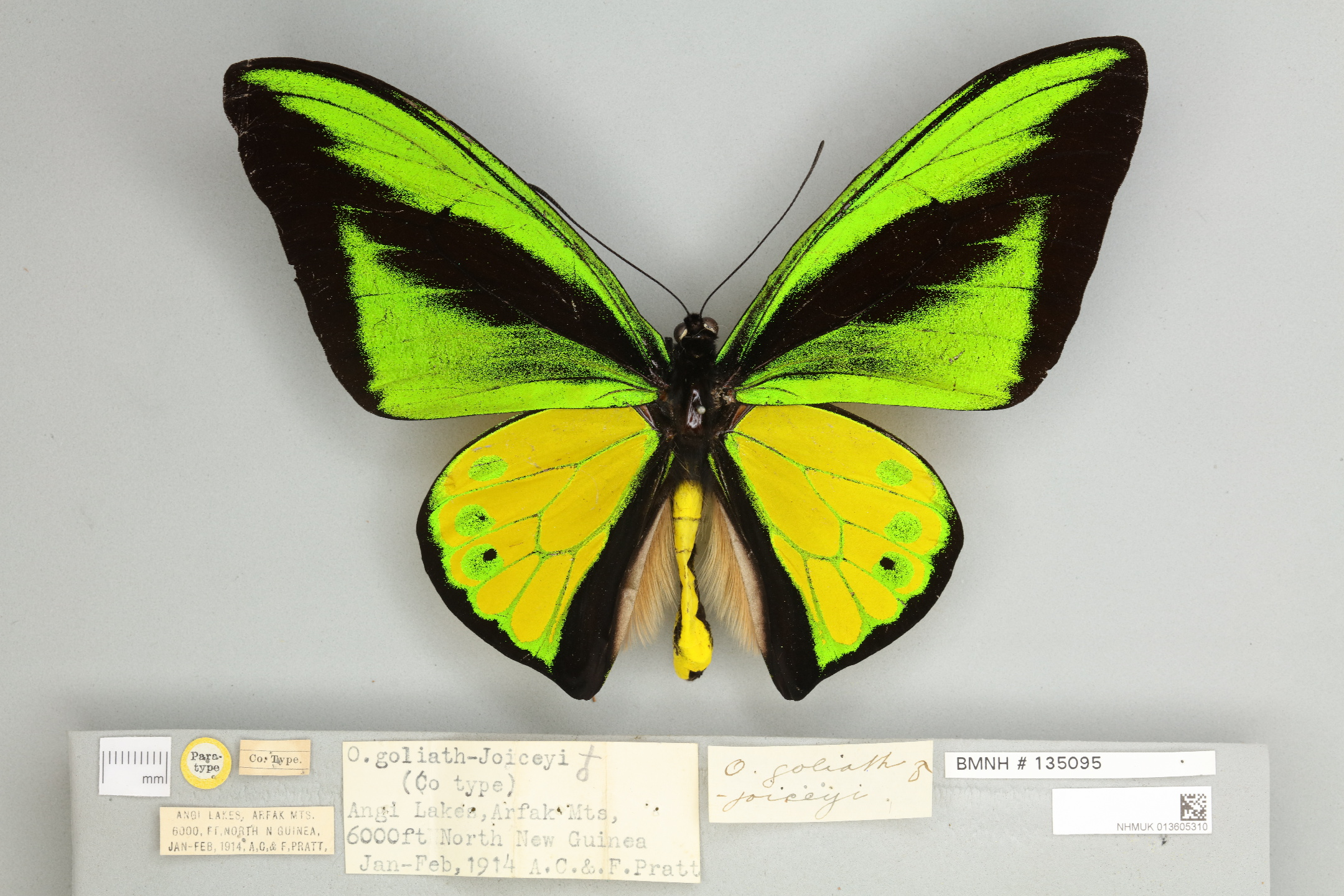
Ornithoptera goliath samson f. joiceyi

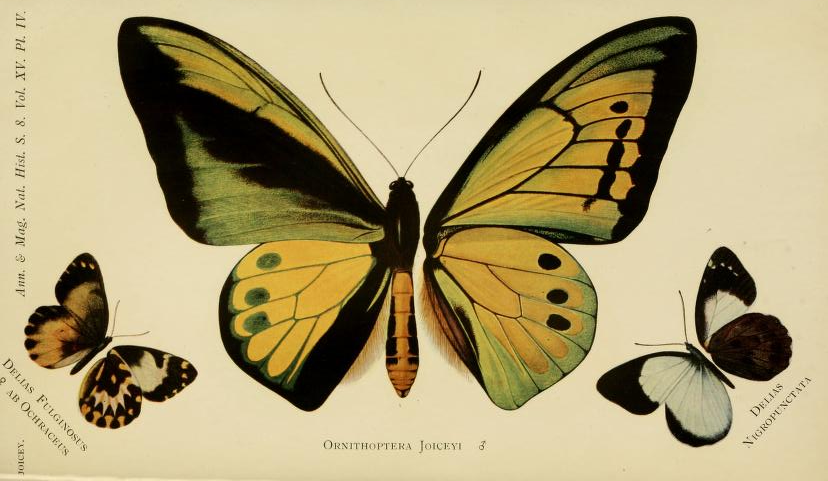
Ornithoptera joyceyi (male), two Delias

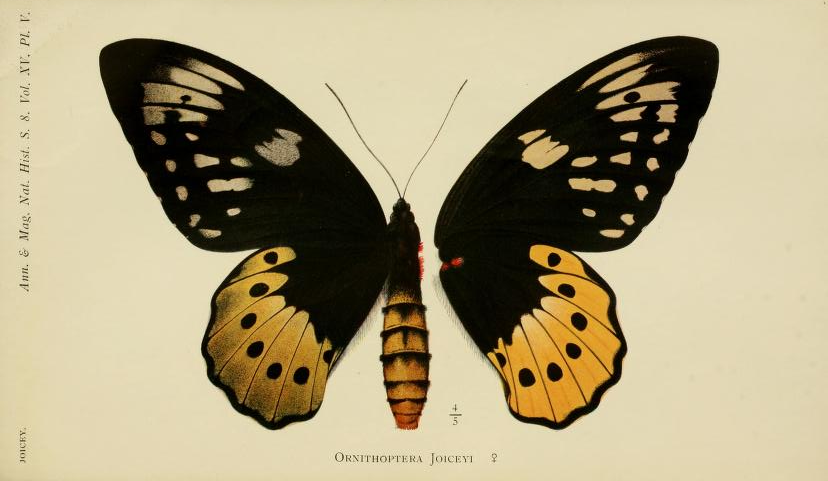
Ornithoptera joiceyi (female)

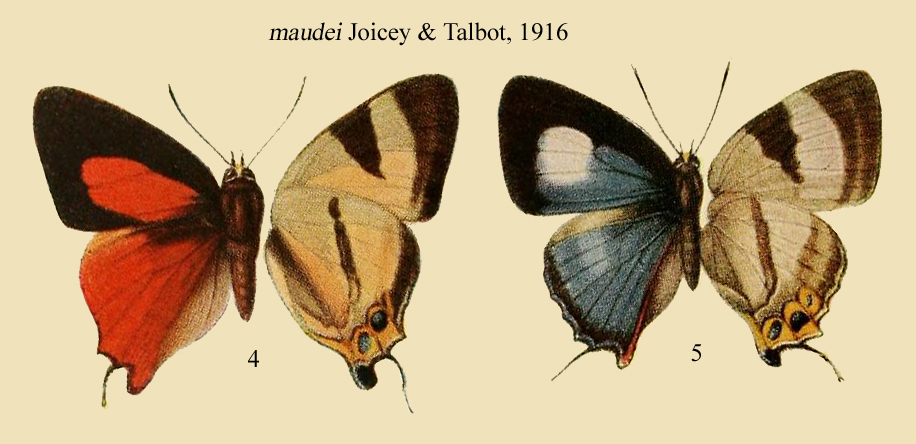
Deudorix maudei

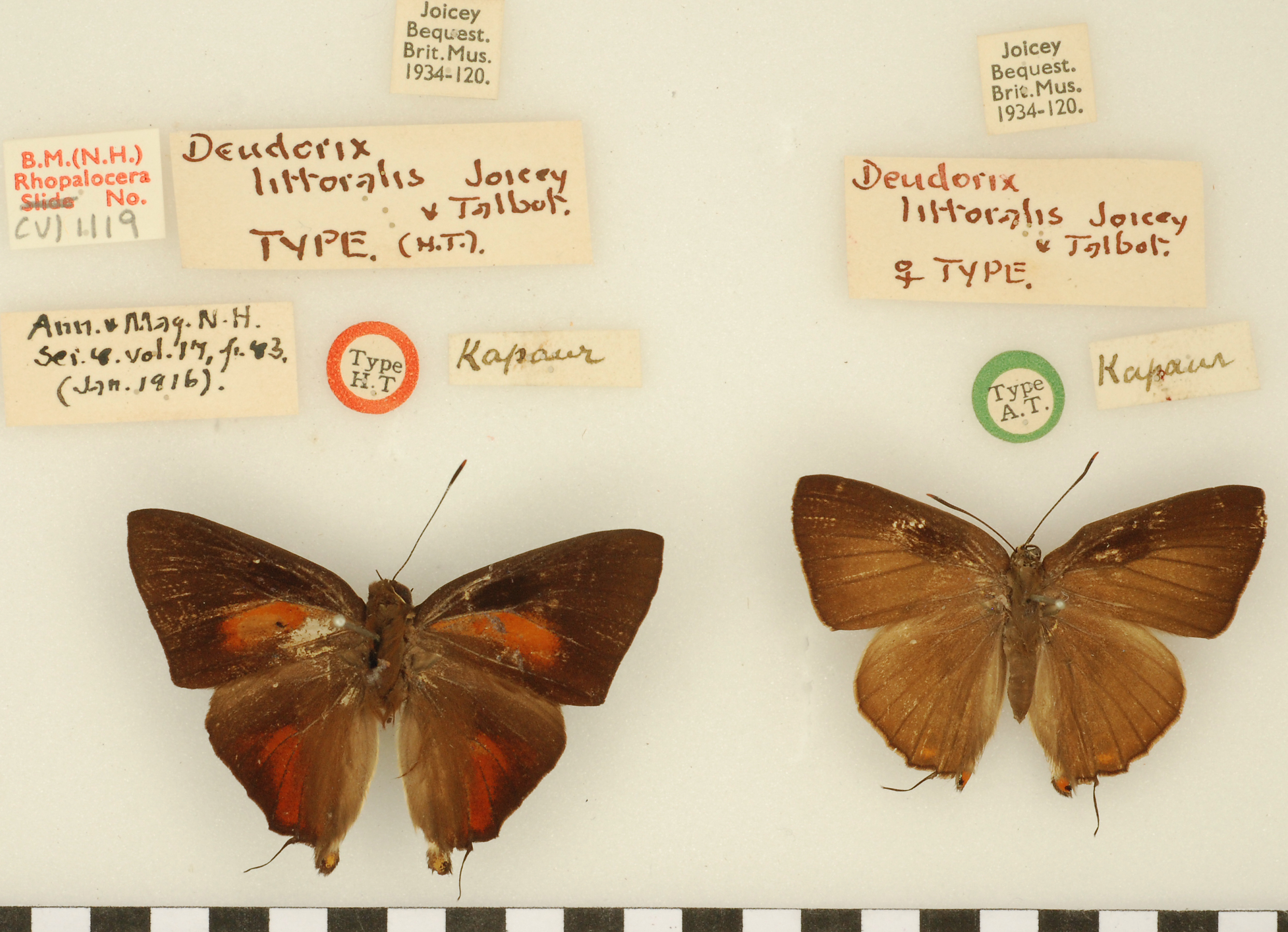
Deudorix littoralis (male & female types)

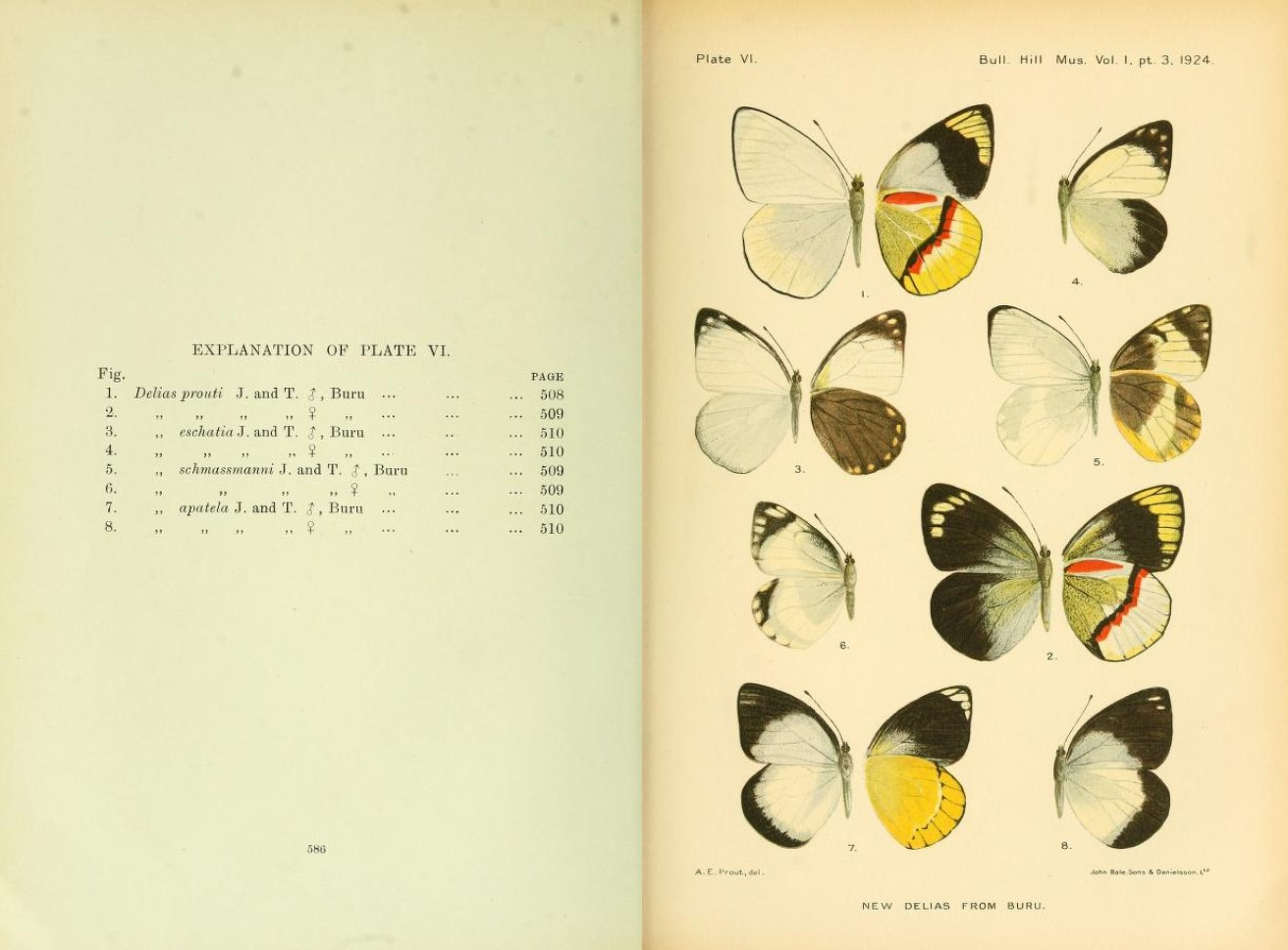
New Delias from Buru

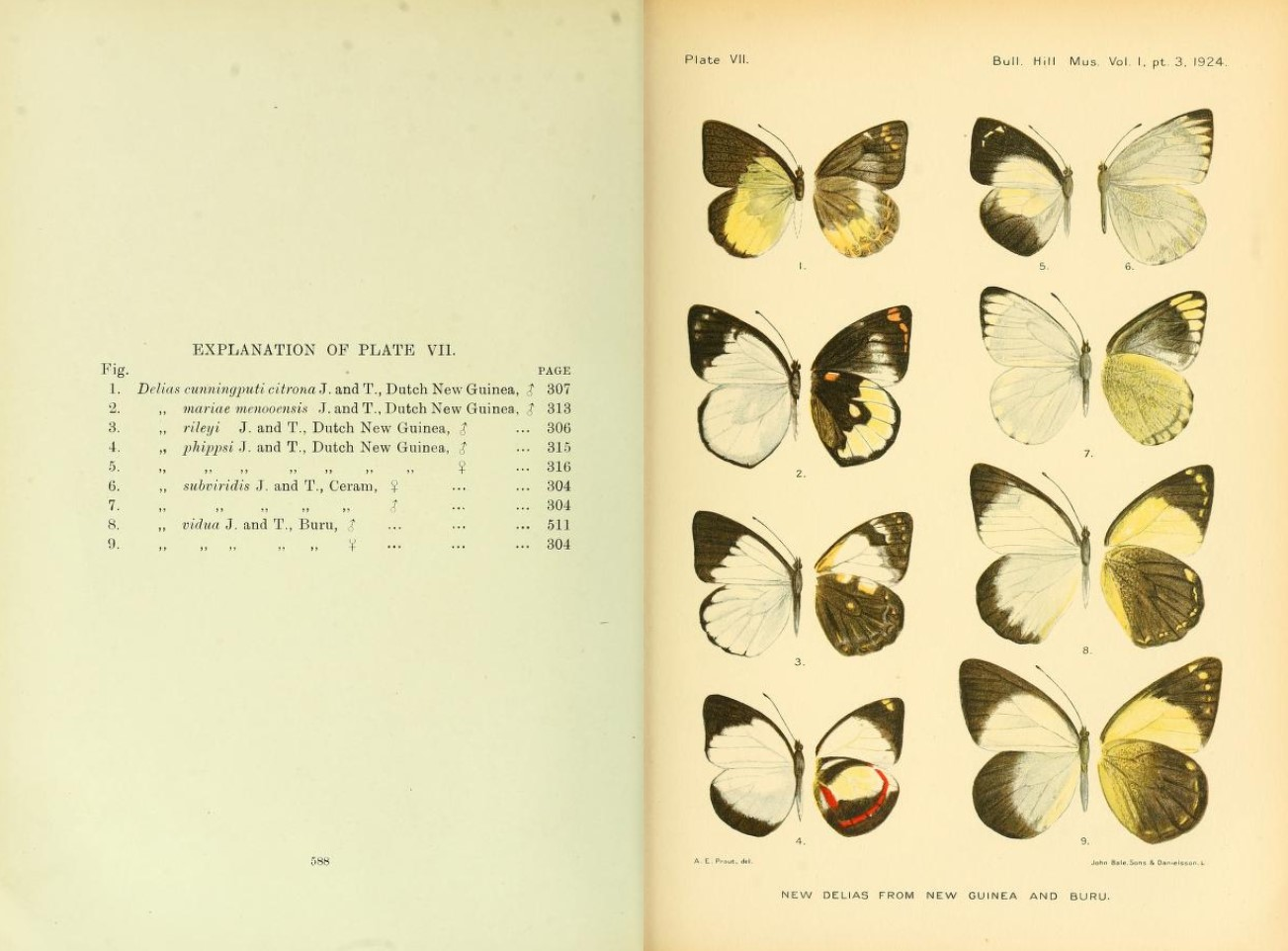
New Delias from New Guinea and Buru

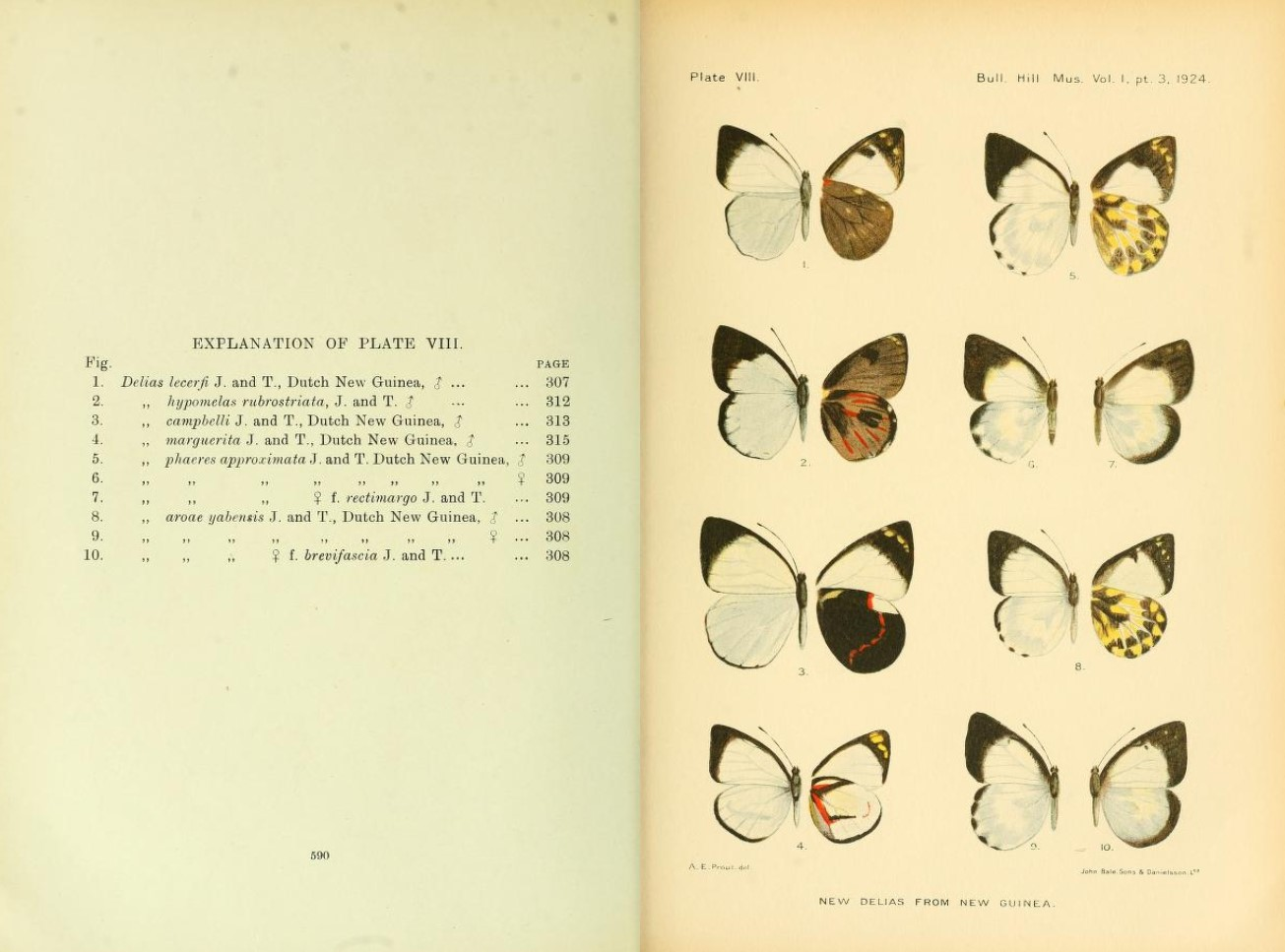
New Delias from New Guinea

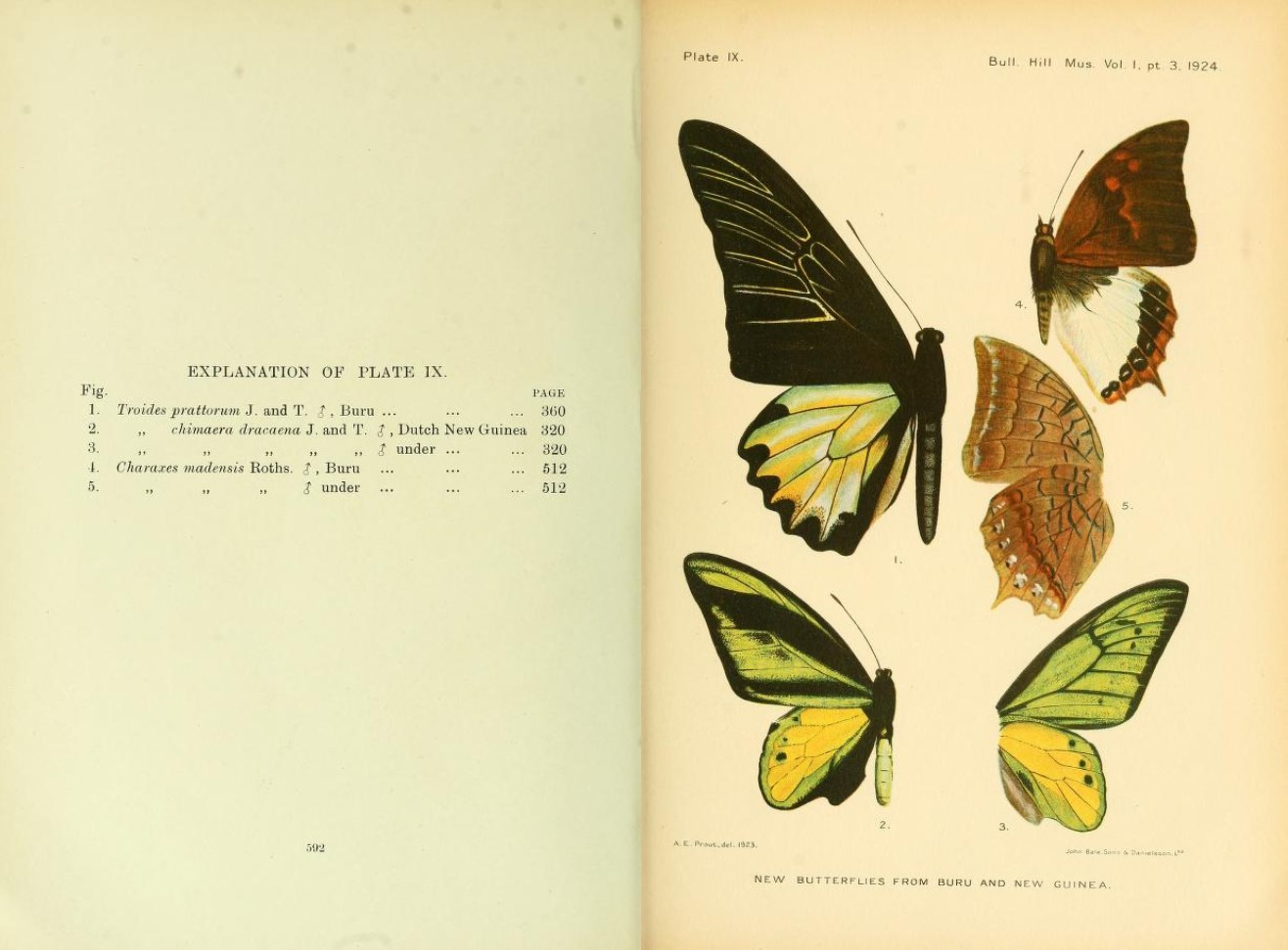
New butterflies from Buru and New Guinea

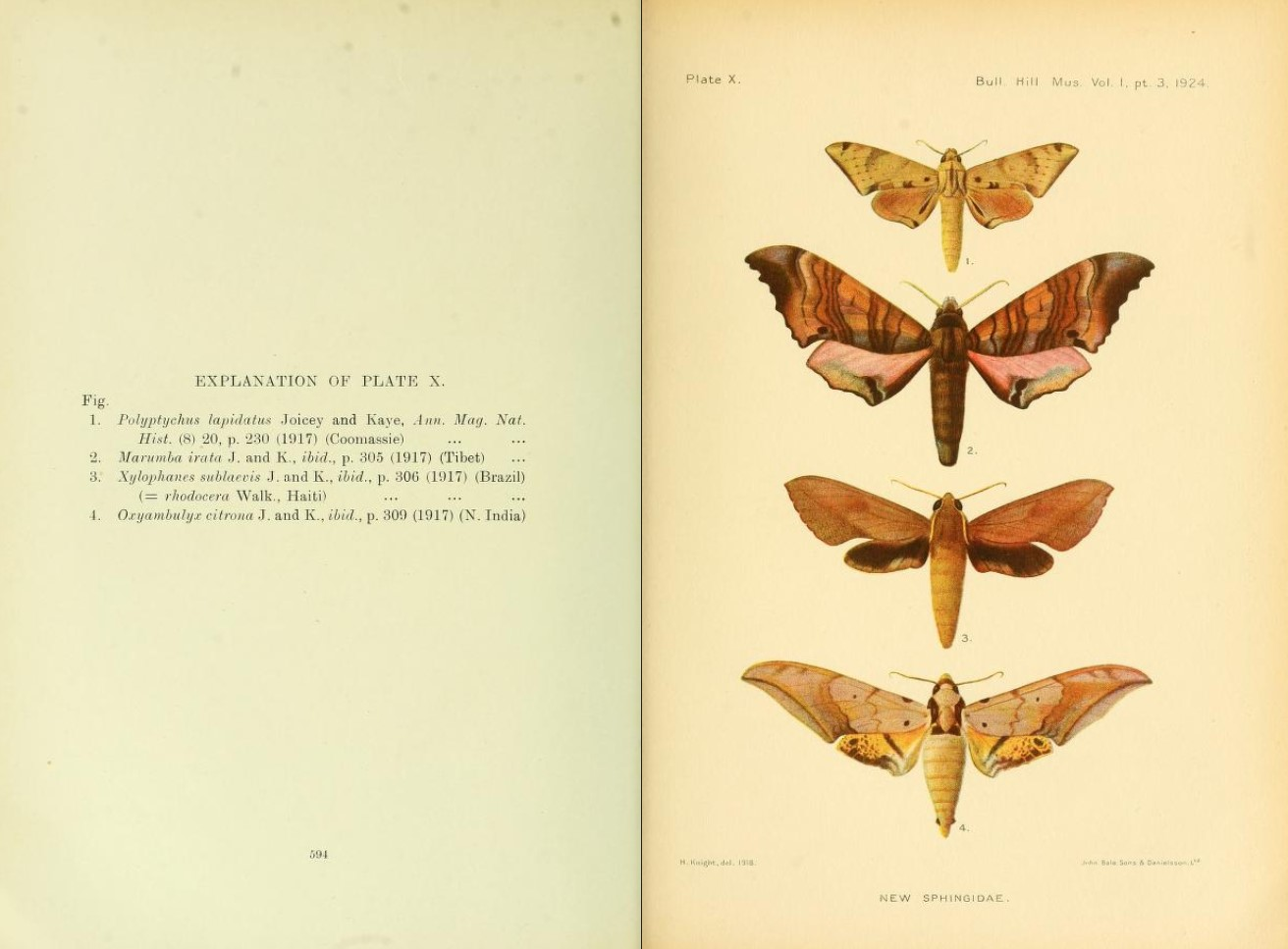
New Sphingidae

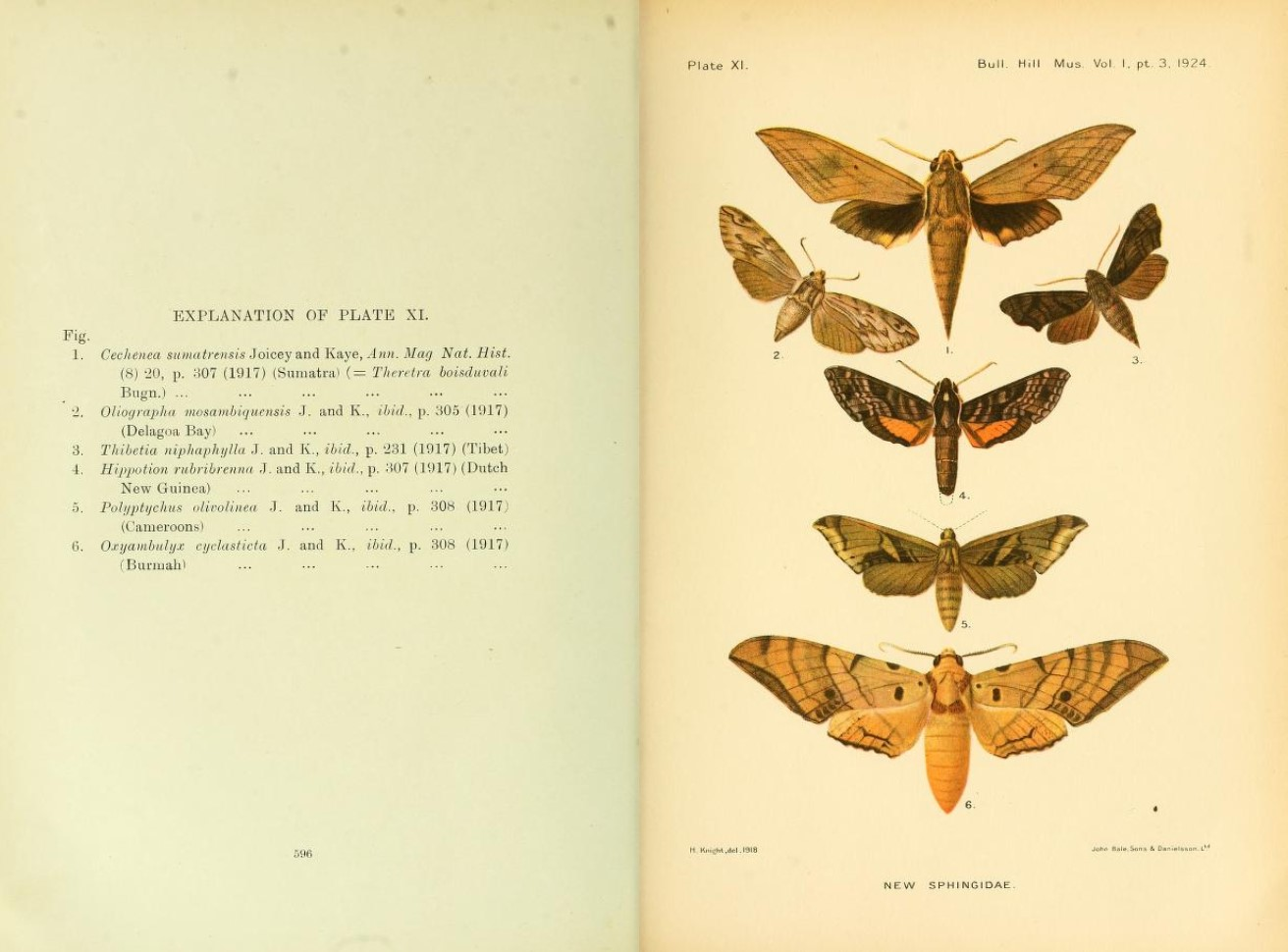
New Sphingidae

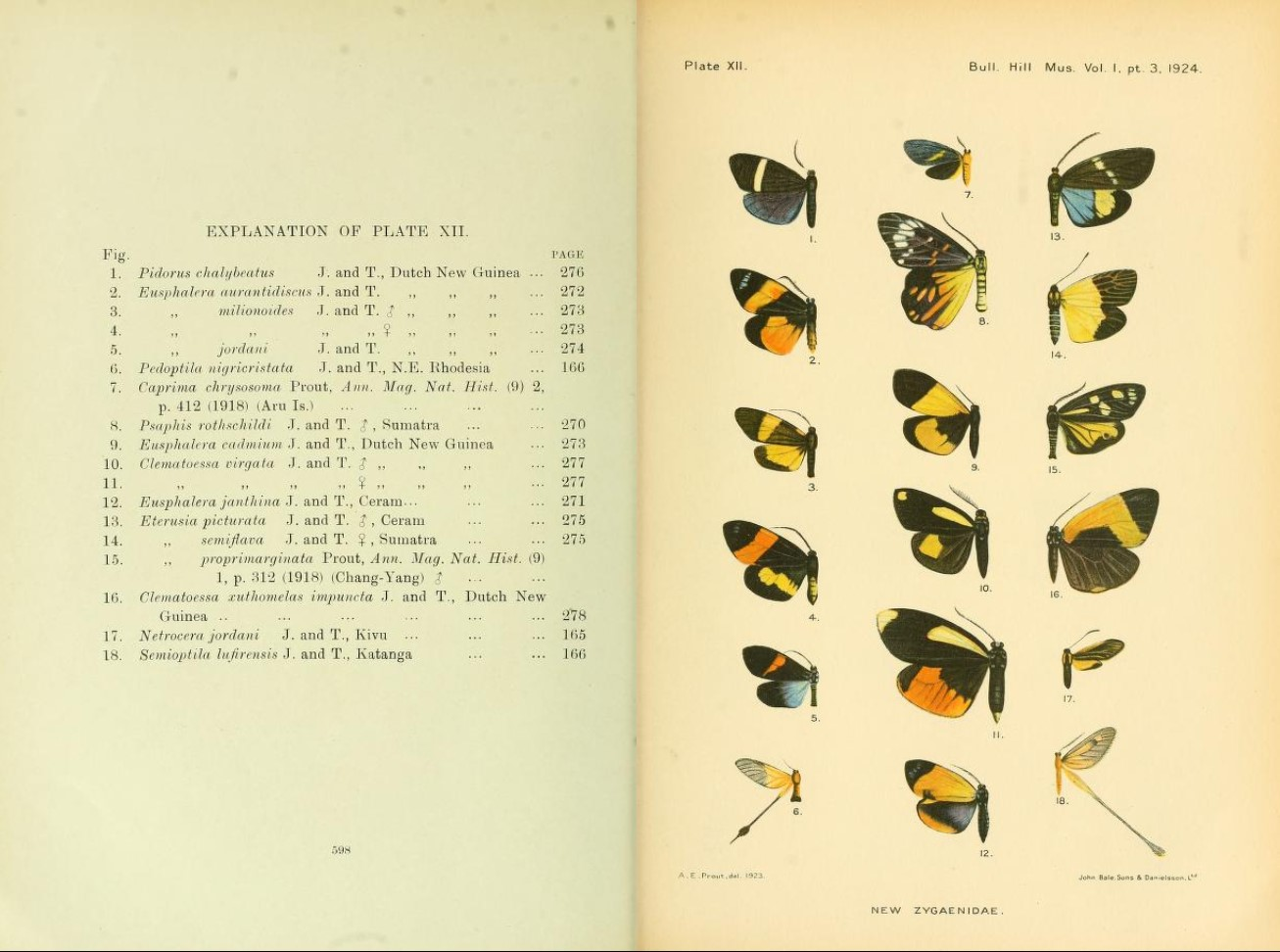
New Zygaenidae

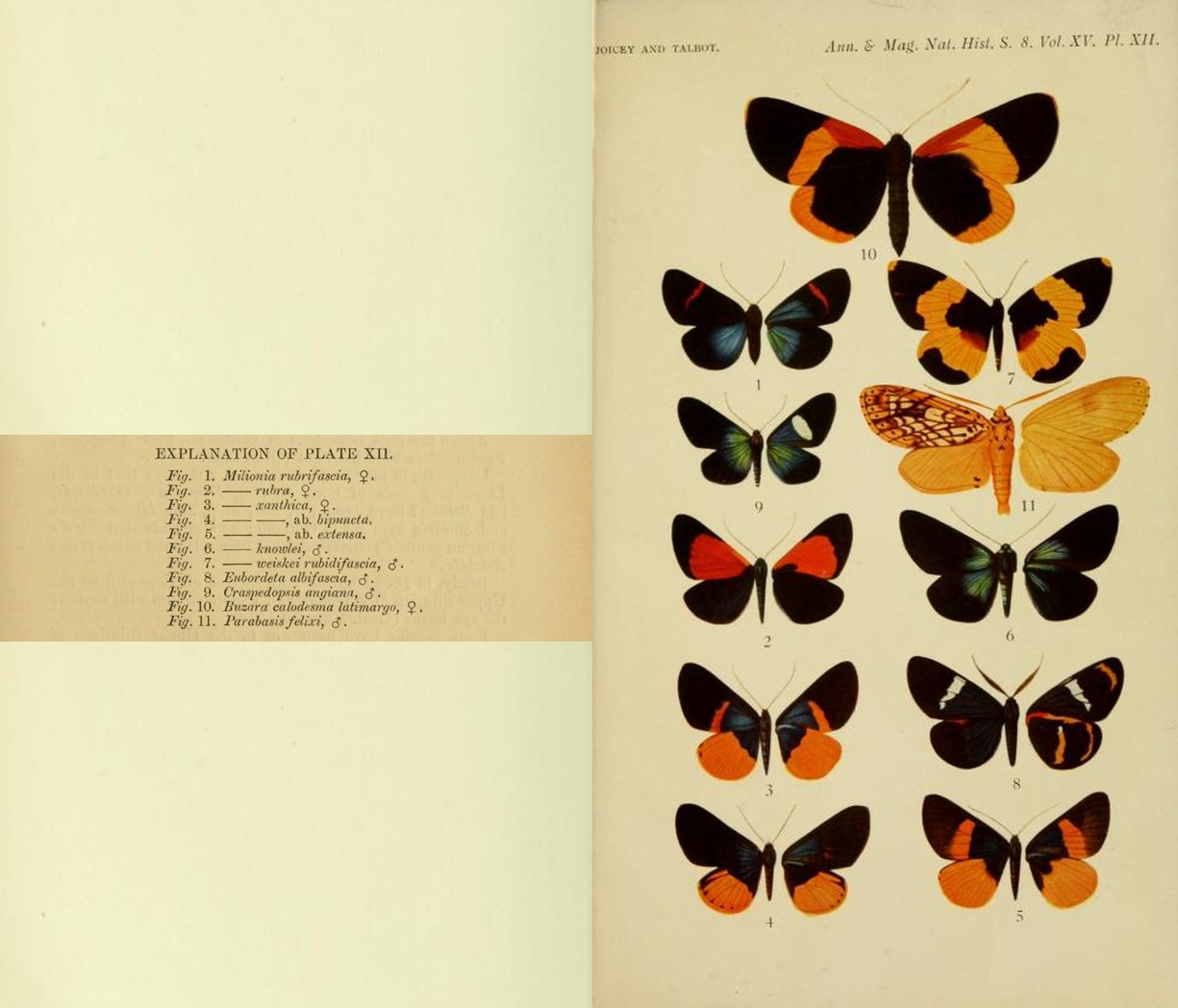
Milionia, four others

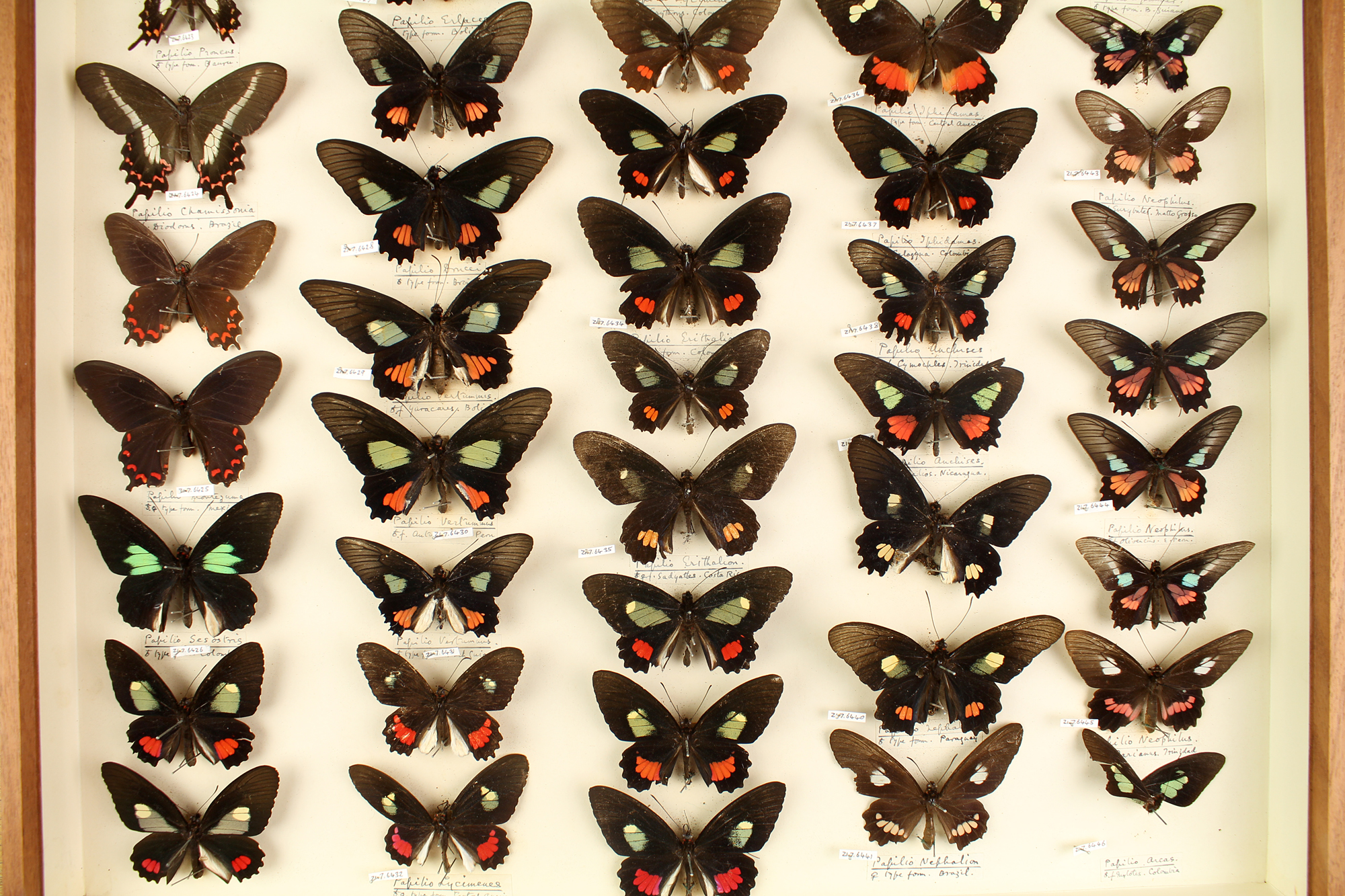
South American Papilio

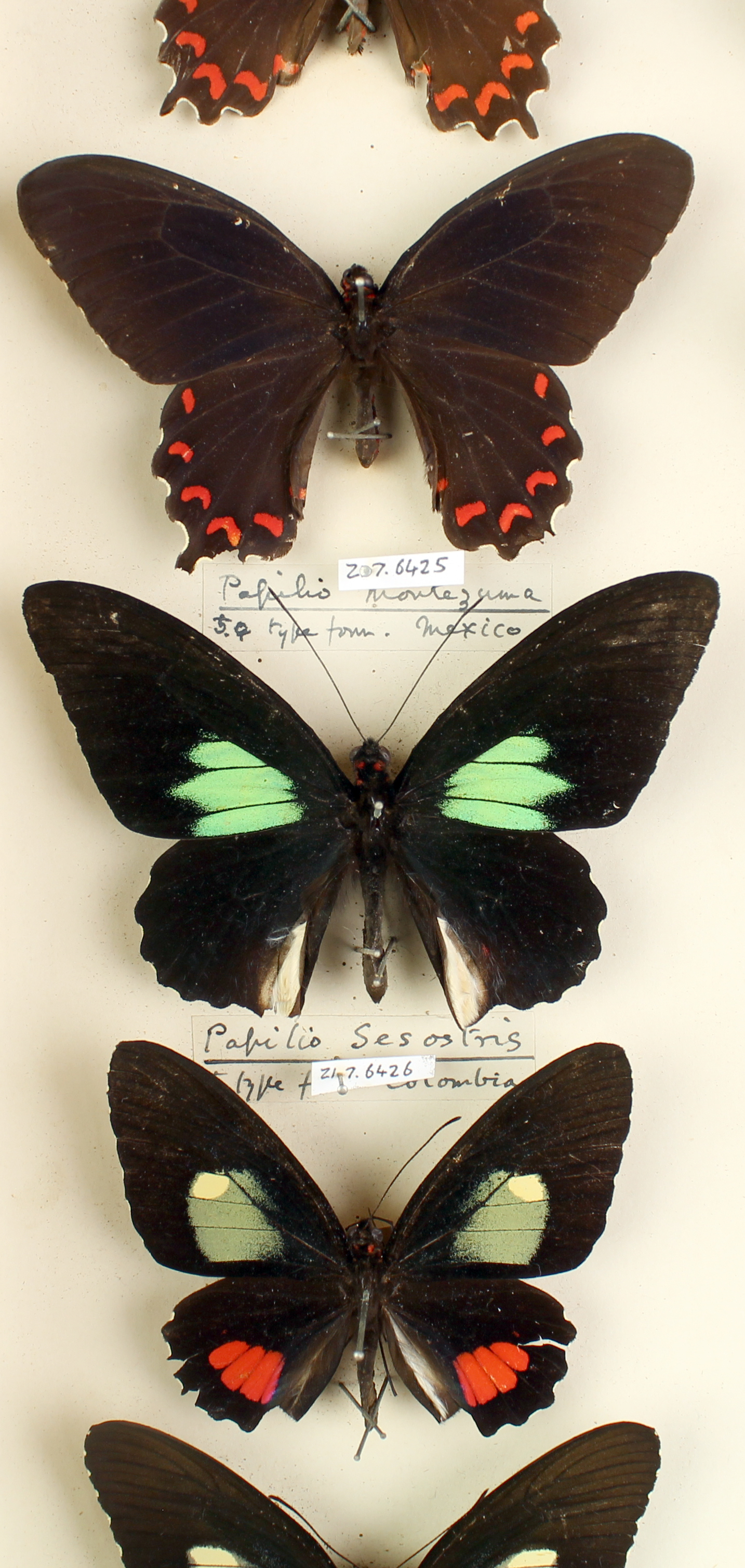
South American Papilio (detail)

== Legacy ==
Joicey's Hill Museum produced more than 190 research articles which were published in a range of scientific journals. In 1934, the Natural History Museum received more than 300,000 specimens as part of the Joicey Bequest. Together with the Oberthür and Rothschild collections, the Joicey collection contributed significantly to the quality and number of the Lepidoptera collection held by the Natural History Museum, London.

A report in Nature stated that,

During his life-time, the late J. J. Joicey probably did more to stimulate the study of butterflies and moths, especially those of Africa, than any other private individual in Great Britain.

== Works ==
=== Joicey and Talbot (partial list) ===
- New Species of Heterocera from Dutch New Guinea. Annals and Magazine of Natural History (Eighth series) 15 (87): 295–301, pl. XII (1915)
- New Lepidoptera from the Dutch New Guinea (with A. Noakes). Transactions of the Entomological Society of London 63 (3,4): 361–386, pls LV–LXII (1916)
- New Lepidoptera from the Schouten Islands. Transactions of the Entomological Society of London 64 (1): 65–83, pls 3–6 (1916)
- New Heterocera from Dutch New Guinea. Annals and Magazine of Natural History (Eighth series) 20 (115): 50–87, pls 1–4 (1917)
- New Lepidoptera from Waigeu, Dutch New Guinea and Biak. Annals and Magazine of Natural History (Eighth series) 20 (117): 216–229 (1917)
- New South-American Rhopalocera. Proceedings of the Zoological Society of London 1917: 259–264, pl I (1918)
- New South-American Arctiidae. Proceedings of the Zoological Society of London 1917: 265–270, pl I (1918)
- New butterflies from Africa and the east. Proceedings of the Zoological Society of London 1917: 271–272 (1918)
- A Gynandromorph of Papilio lycophron Hbn. Proceedings of the Zoological Society of London 1917: 273, pl II (1918)
- Three Aberrations of Lepidoptera. Proceedings of the Zoological Society of London 1917: 275–276, pl I (1918)
- New forms of Indo-Australian butterflies. Bulletin of the Hill Museum 1 (3): 565–569 (1924)
- New forms of Lepidoptera Rhopalocera. Encyclopedia of Entomology (B III Lepidoptera) 2: 1–14 (1926)
- New forms of Rhopalocera in the Hill Museum. Bulletin of the Hill Museum 2 (1): 19–27 (1928)
- Also see the BioNames database linking taxonomic names to their original descriptions

The majority of the papers are of a purely systematic nature, consisting of the description of new species or the revision of various genera; but there are several of principally faunistic interest, as, for example, the Catalogue of the Lepidoptera of Hainan. They represent a contribution to the study of the exotic Lepidoptera of very great scientific value.

— Joicey's obituary in The Entomologist, 1932

=== Associated with the Hill Museum ===
The Bulletin of the Hill Museum (111 articles and 80 plates)

- 1921
- 1921–1924
- 1924
- 1928
- 1929
- 1931

Other journals (82 articles) (partial list)

- 1914–1916
- 1916–1921
- 1921–1924
- 1924–1927

== Summaries ==
- Anon. 1932: [Joicey, J. J.] Entomological News 43: 140
- Anon. 1932: [Joicey, J. J.] London Naturalist 1931: 38
- Anon. 1932: [Joicey, J. J.] Nature 129: 535, 896
- Anon. 1932: [Joicey J. J.] Orchid Review 40: 118
- Anon. 1932: [Joicey J. J.] The Times (16 March) p. 9
- Gilbert, P. 2000: Butterfly Collectors and Painters: Four Centuries of Colour Plates from the Library Collections of the Natural History Museum, London. Singapore, Beaumont Publishing Pte Ltd: X+166 S, pp. 31–33
- Riley, N. D. 1932: [Joicey, J. J.] Entomologist 65: 142–144
- Turner, H. J. 1932: [Joicey, J. J.] Entomologist's Record & Journal of Variation 44: 68
