= List of moths of Australia (Hyblaeidae) =

Partial list of Australian moths

This is a list of the Australian moth species of the family Hyblaeidae. It also acts as an index to the species articles and forms part of the full List of moths of Australia.

- Hyblaea constellata Guenée, 1852
- Hyblaea ibidias Turner, 1902
- Hyblaea puera (Cramer, 1777)
- Hyblaea synaema Turner, 1902
