= Hyblaea sanguinea =

Scientific classification
- Domain: Eukaryota
- Kingdom: Animalia
- Phylum: Arthropoda
- Class: Insecta
- Order: Lepidoptera
- Family: Hyblaeidae
- Genus: Hyblaea
- Species: H. sanguinea

Binomial name
- Hyblaea sanguinea Gaede, 1917

Moth species in family Hyblaeidae

Hyblaea sanguinea is a moth in the family Hyblaeidae described by Max Gaede in 1917.

== Subspecies ==
- Hyblaea sanguinea sanguinea
- Hyblaea sanguinea vitiensis Prout, 1919
