= Hyblaea strigulata =

Scientific classification
- Domain: Eukaryota
- Kingdom: Animalia
- Phylum: Arthropoda
- Class: Insecta
- Order: Lepidoptera
- Family: Hyblaeidae
- Genus: Hyblaea
- Species: H. strigulata

Binomial name
- Hyblaea strigulata Gaede, 1917

Moth species in family Hyblaeidae

Hyblaea strigulata is a moth in the family Hyblaeidae described by Max Gaede in 1917.
