= Hyblaea insulsa =

Scientific classification
- Domain: Eukaryota
- Kingdom: Animalia
- Phylum: Arthropoda
- Class: Insecta
- Order: Lepidoptera
- Family: Hyblaeidae
- Genus: Hyblaea
- Species: H. insulsa

Binomial name
- Hyblaea insulsa Gaede, 1917

Moth species in family Hyblaeidae

Hyblaea insulsa is a moth in the family Hyblaeidae described by Max Gaede in 1917.
