= Hyblaea inferna =

Scientific classification
- Domain: Eukaryota
- Kingdom: Animalia
- Phylum: Arthropoda
- Class: Insecta
- Order: Lepidoptera
- Family: Hyblaeidae
- Genus: Hyblaea
- Species: H. inferna

Binomial name
- Hyblaea inferna Gaede, 1917

Moth species in family Hyblaeidae

Hyblaea inferna is a moth in the family Hyblaeidae described by Max Gaede in 1917.
