= Hyblaea rosacea =

Scientific classification
- Domain: Eukaryota
- Kingdom: Animalia
- Phylum: Arthropoda
- Class: Insecta
- Order: Lepidoptera
- Family: Hyblaeidae
- Genus: Hyblaea
- Species: H. rosacea

Binomial name
- Hyblaea rosacea Gaede, 1917

Moth species in family Hyblaeidae

Hyblaea rosacea is a moth in the family Hyblaeidae described by Max Gaede in 1917.
