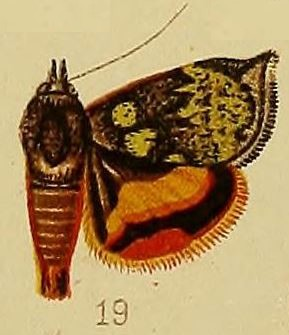

Scientific classification
- Kingdom: Animalia
- Phylum: Arthropoda
- Clade: Pancrustacea
- Class: Insecta
- Order: Lepidoptera
- Family: Hyblaeidae
- Genus: Hyblaea
- Species: H. flavipicta

Binomial name
- Hyblaea flavipicta Hampson, 1910

= Hyblaea flavipicta =

Moth species in family Hyblaeidae

Hyblaea flavipicta is a moth in the family Hyblaeidae described by George Hampson in 1910. A material sample of it was found on the southeast coast of Kenya.
