= Hyblaea hypocyanea =

Scientific classification
- Domain: Eukaryota
- Kingdom: Animalia
- Phylum: Arthropoda
- Class: Insecta
- Order: Lepidoptera
- Family: Hyblaeidae
- Genus: Hyblaea
- Species: H. hypocyanea

Binomial name
- Hyblaea hypocyanea Swinhoe, 1895

Moth species in family Hyblaeidae

Hyblaea hypocyanea is a moth in the family Hyblaeidae described by Swinhoe in 1895.
