= Hyblaea fortissima =

Scientific classification
- Domain: Eukaryota
- Kingdom: Animalia
- Phylum: Arthropoda
- Class: Insecta
- Order: Lepidoptera
- Family: Hyblaeidae
- Genus: Hyblaea
- Species: H. fortissima

Binomial name
- Hyblaea fortissima Butler, 1881

Moth species in family Hyblaeidae

Hyblaea fortissima is a moth in the family Hyblaeidae described by Butler in 1881.
