= Hyblaea vasa =

Scientific classification
- Domain: Eukaryota
- Kingdom: Animalia
- Phylum: Arthropoda
- Class: Insecta
- Order: Lepidoptera
- Family: Hyblaeidae
- Genus: Hyblaea
- Species: H. vasa

Binomial name
- Hyblaea vasa Swinhoe, 1903

Moth species in family Hyblaeidae

Hyblaea vasa is a moth in the family Hyblaeidae described by Swinhoe in 1903.
