= Hyblaea asava =

Scientific classification
- Domain: Eukaryota
- Kingdom: Animalia
- Phylum: Arthropoda
- Class: Insecta
- Order: Lepidoptera
- Family: Hyblaeidae
- Genus: Hyblaea
- Species: H. asava

Binomial name
- Hyblaea asava Swinhoe, 1909

Moth species in family Hyblaeidae

Hyblaea asava is a moth in the family Hyblaeidae described by Charles Swinhoe in 1909.
