= Hyblaea saturata =

Scientific classification
- Domain: Eukaryota
- Kingdom: Animalia
- Phylum: Arthropoda
- Class: Insecta
- Order: Lepidoptera
- Family: Hyblaeidae
- Genus: Hyblaea
- Species: H. saturata

Binomial name
- Hyblaea saturata Walker, 1865

Moth species in family Hyblaeidae

Hyblaea saturata is a moth in the family Hyblaeidae described by Francis Walker in 1865.
