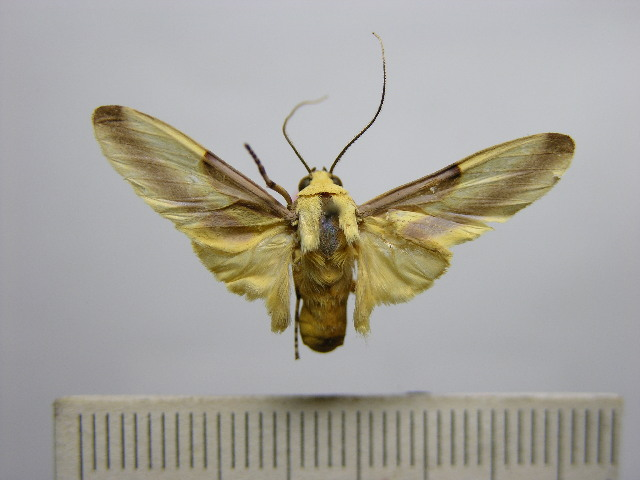
- Sutonocrea lobifer

Scientific classification
- Domain: Eukaryota
- Kingdom: Animalia
- Phylum: Arthropoda
- Class: Insecta
- Order: Lepidoptera
- Superfamily: Noctuoidea
- Family: Erebidae
- Subfamily: Arctiinae
- Subtribe: Phaegopterina
- Genus: Sutonocrea; Butler, 1876

= Sutonocrea =

Genus of moths

Sutonocrea is a genus of moths in the family Erebidae.

== Species ==
- Sutonocrea duplicata Gaede, 1928
- Sutonocrea fassli Dognin, 1910
- Sutonocrea hoffmanni Schaus, 1933
- Sutonocrea lobifer Herrich-Schäffer, 1855
- Sutonocrea reducta Walker, 1856

== Former species ==
- Sutonocrea novata Dognin, 1924
