= Erythrochrus notabilis =

Scientific classification
- Kingdom: Animalia
- Phylum: Arthropoda
- Class: Insecta
- Order: Lepidoptera
- Family: Hyblaeidae
- Genus: Erythrochrus
- Species: E. notabilis

Binomial name
- Erythrochrus notabilis Schaus, 1911

Moth species in family Hyblaeidae

Erythrochrus notabilis is a moth in the family Hyblaeidae described by Schaus in 1911.
