= Sciopsyche =

Scientific classification
- Kingdom: Animalia
- Phylum: Arthropoda
- Class: Insecta
- Order: Lepidoptera
- Superfamily: Noctuoidea
- Family: Erebidae
- Subfamily: Arctiinae
- Genus: Sciopsyche; Butler, 1876

Genus of moths

Sciopsyche is a genus of moths in the subfamily Arctiinae. The genus was erected by Arthur Gardiner Butler in 1876.

== Species ==
- Sciopsyche tropica Walker, 1854

== Former species ==
- Sciopsyche remissa Dognin, 1902
