= Hyblaea erycinoides =

Scientific classification
- Domain: Eukaryota
- Kingdom: Animalia
- Phylum: Arthropoda
- Class: Insecta
- Order: Lepidoptera
- Family: Hyblaeidae
- Genus: Hyblaea
- Species: H. erycinoides

Binomial name
- Hyblaea erycinoides Walker, 1858

Moth species in family Hyblaeidae

Hyblaea erycinoides is a moth in the family Hyblaeidae described by Francis Walker in 1858.
