= Premolis =

Scientific classification
- Kingdom: Animalia
- Phylum: Arthropoda
- Clade: Pancrustacea
- Class: Insecta
- Order: Lepidoptera
- Superfamily: Noctuoidea
- Family: Erebidae
- Subfamily: Arctiinae
- Subtribe: Phaegopterina
- Genus: Premolis; Hampson, 1901

Genus of moths

Premolis is a genus of moths in the family Erebidae. The genus was erected by George Hampson in 1901.

== Species ==
- Premolis amaryllis
- Premolis schausi
- Premolis semirufa

== Former species ==
- Premolis excavata
- Premolis rhyssa
