= Hyblaea tenebrionis =

Scientific classification
- Domain: Eukaryota
- Kingdom: Animalia
- Phylum: Arthropoda
- Class: Insecta
- Order: Lepidoptera
- Family: Hyblaeidae
- Genus: Hyblaea
- Species: H. tenebrionis

Binomial name
- Hyblaea tenebrionis C. Felder, R. Felder & Rogenhofer, 1874

Moth species in family Hyblaeidae

Hyblaea tenebrionis is a moth in the family Hyblaeidae described by Cajetan Felder, Rudolf Felder and Alois Friedrich Rogenhofer in 1874.
