= Hyblaea fontainei =

Scientific classification
- Domain: Eukaryota
- Kingdom: Animalia
- Phylum: Arthropoda
- Class: Insecta
- Order: Lepidoptera
- Family: Hyblaeidae
- Genus: Hyblaea
- Species: H. fontainei

Binomial name
- Hyblaea fontainei Berio, 1967

Moth species in family Hyblaeidae

Hyblaea fontainei is a moth in the family Hyblaeidae described by Emilio Berio in 1967.
