= Hyblaea castanea =

Scientific classification
- Domain: Eukaryota
- Kingdom: Animalia
- Phylum: Arthropoda
- Class: Insecta
- Order: Lepidoptera
- Family: Hyblaeidae
- Genus: Hyblaea
- Species: H. castanea

Binomial name
- Hyblaea castanea Tams, 1924

Moth species in family Hyblaeidae

Hyblaea castanea is a moth in the family Hyblaeidae described by Tams in 1924.
