= Hyblaea esakii =

Scientific classification
- Kingdom: Animalia
- Phylum: Arthropoda
- Clade: Pancrustacea
- Class: Insecta
- Order: Lepidoptera
- Family: Hyblaeidae
- Genus: Hyblaea
- Species: H. esakii

Binomial name
- Hyblaea esakii Sugi, 1958

Moth species in family Hyblaeidae

Hyblaea esakii is a moth in the family Hyblaeidae described by Shigero Sugi in 1958.
