= Hyblaea amboinae =

Scientific classification
- Kingdom: Animalia
- Phylum: Arthropoda
- Clade: Pancrustacea
- Class: Insecta
- Order: Lepidoptera
- Family: Hyblaeidae
- Genus: Hyblaea
- Species: H. amboinae

Binomial name
- Hyblaea amboinae C. Felder, R. Felder & Rogenhofer, 1874

Moth species in family Hyblaeidae

Hyblaea amboinae is a moth in the family Hyblaeidae described by Cajetan Felder, Rudolf Felder and Alois Friedrich Rogenhofer in 1874. The Hyblaea genus, also called teak moths, is part of the family Hyblaeidae, which was first described in 1793, by the zoologist Johan Christian Fabricius. Hyblaea amboinae are found in New Guinea and the Moluccas, where they are very common.
