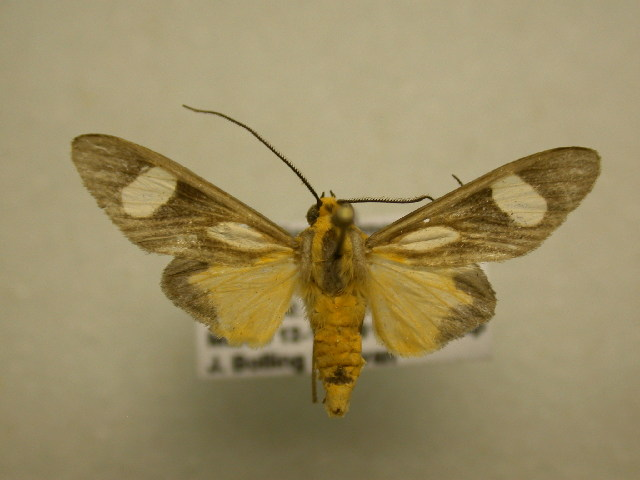
- Glaucostola metaxantha

Scientific classification
- Kingdom: Animalia
- Phylum: Arthropoda
- Class: Insecta
- Order: Lepidoptera
- Superfamily: Noctuoidea
- Family: Erebidae
- Subfamily: Arctiinae
- Subtribe: Phaegopterina
- Genus: Glaucostola; Hampson, 1901

Type species
- Leucopsumis guttipalpis Walker, 1856

= Glaucostola =

Genus of moths

Glaucostola is a genus of moths in the family Erebidae. The genus was erected by George Hampson in 1901.

== Species ==
- Glaucostola acantha Laguerre, 2015
- Glaucostola beneluzi (de Toulgoët, 2001)
- Glaucostola eximiai Cerda, 2023
- Glaucostola guttipalpis (Walker, 1856)
- Glaucostola holophaea (Hampson, 1905)
- Glaucostola indagatai Laguerre, 2016
- Glaucostola romula (Druce, 1895) (= Glaucostola underwoodi Rothschild, 1910)

Elsewhere:
Glaucostola binotata (= Kirrostola binotata (Schaus, 1905)
Glaucostola flavida (= Pyrrostola flavida (Schaus, 1905))
Glaucostola maroniensis (= Kirrostola maroniensis (Joicey & Talbot, 1918))
Glaucostola metaxantha (= Kirrostola metaxantha (Schaus, 1905))
Glaucostola simulans (= Pyrrostola simulans (de Toulgoët, 1987))
