= Prosiccia trifasciata =

Scientific classification
- Domain: Eukaryota
- Kingdom: Animalia
- Phylum: Arthropoda
- Class: Insecta
- Order: Lepidoptera
- Superfamily: Noctuoidea
- Family: Erebidae
- Subfamily: Arctiinae
- Genus: Prosiccia
- Species: P. trifasciata

Binomial name
- Prosiccia trifasciata Gaede, 1925

Species of moth

Prosiccia trifasciata is a moth in the family Erebidae first described by Max Gaede in 1925. It is found in New Guinea.
