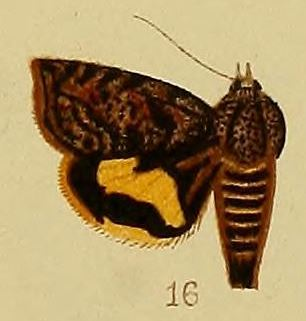

Scientific classification
- Domain: Eukaryota
- Kingdom: Animalia
- Phylum: Arthropoda
- Class: Insecta
- Order: Lepidoptera
- Family: Hyblaeidae
- Genus: Hyblaea
- Species: H. flavifasciata

Binomial name
- Hyblaea flavifasciata Hampson, 1910

= Hyblaea flavifasciata =

Moth species in family Hyblaeidae

Hyblaea flavifasciata is a moth in the family Hyblaeidae described by George Hampson in 1910.
