= Ischnocampa angulosa =

Scientific classification
- Domain: Eukaryota
- Kingdom: Animalia
- Phylum: Arthropoda
- Class: Insecta
- Order: Lepidoptera
- Superfamily: Noctuoidea
- Family: Erebidae
- Subfamily: Arctiinae
- Genus: Ischnocampa
- Species: I. angulosa

Binomial name
- Ischnocampa angulosa Gaede, 1928

Species of moth

Ischnocampa angulosa is a moth of the family Erebidae. It was described by Max Gaede in 1928. It is found in Brazil.
