= Hyblaea aterrima =

Scientific classification
- Domain: Eukaryota
- Kingdom: Animalia
- Phylum: Arthropoda
- Class: Insecta
- Order: Lepidoptera
- Family: Hyblaeidae
- Genus: Hyblaea
- Species: H. aterrima

Binomial name
- Hyblaea aterrima Holland, 1900

Moth species in family Hyblaeidae

Hyblaea aterrima is a moth in the family Hyblaeidae described by William Jacob Holland in 1900.
