= Hyblaea paulianii =

Scientific classification
- Domain: Eukaryota
- Kingdom: Animalia
- Phylum: Arthropoda
- Class: Insecta
- Order: Lepidoptera
- Family: Hyblaeidae
- Genus: Hyblaea
- Species: H. paulianii

Binomial name
- Hyblaea paulianii Viette, 1961

Moth species in family Hyblaeidae

Hyblaea paulianii is a moth in the family Hyblaeidae described by Viette in 1961.
