= Sutonocrea duplicata =

Scientific classification
- Domain: Eukaryota
- Kingdom: Animalia
- Phylum: Arthropoda
- Class: Insecta
- Order: Lepidoptera
- Superfamily: Noctuoidea
- Family: Erebidae
- Subfamily: Arctiinae
- Genus: Sutonocrea
- Species: S. duplicata

Binomial name
- Sutonocrea duplicata (Gaede, 1928)

Synonyms
- Automolis duplicata Gaede, 1928

Species of moth

Sutonocrea duplicata is a moth in the family Erebidae. It was described by Max Gaede in 1928. It is found in Colombia.
