= Hyblaea subcaerulea =

Scientific classification
- Kingdom: Animalia
- Phylum: Arthropoda
- Clade: Pancrustacea
- Class: Insecta
- Order: Lepidoptera
- Family: Hyblaeidae
- Genus: Hyblaea
- Species: H. subcaerulea

Binomial name
- Hyblaea subcaerulea Prout, 1922

Moth species in family Hyblaeidae

Hyblaea subcaerulea is a moth in the family Hyblaeidae described by Prout in 1922.
