= Erythrochrus bicolor =

Scientific classification
- Kingdom: Animalia
- Phylum: Arthropoda
- Class: Insecta
- Order: Lepidoptera
- Family: Hyblaeidae
- Genus: Erythrochrus
- Species: E. bicolor

Binomial name
- Erythrochrus bicolor Herrich-Schäffer, 1858

Synonyms
- Erythrochrus hyblaeiodes Walker, 1863

Moth species in family Hyblaeidae

Erythrochrus bicolor is a moth in the family Hyblaeidae described by Gottlieb August Wilhelm Herrich-Schäffer in 1858.
