= Scaptius chrysoperina =

Scientific classification
- Domain: Eukaryota
- Kingdom: Animalia
- Phylum: Arthropoda
- Class: Insecta
- Order: Lepidoptera
- Superfamily: Noctuoidea
- Family: Erebidae
- Subfamily: Arctiinae
- Genus: Scaptius
- Species: S. chrysoperina

Binomial name
- Scaptius chrysoperina (Gaede, 1928)

Synonyms
- Automolis chrysoperina Gaede, 1928

Species of moth

Scaptius chrysoperina is a moth in the family Erebidae. It was described by Max Gaede in 1928. It is found in Panama.
