= Hyblaea junctura =

Scientific classification
- Domain: Eukaryota
- Kingdom: Animalia
- Phylum: Arthropoda
- Class: Insecta
- Order: Lepidoptera
- Family: Hyblaeidae
- Genus: Hyblaea
- Species: H. junctura

Binomial name
- Hyblaea junctura Walker, 1865

Moth species in family Hyblaeidae

Hyblaea junctura is a moth in the family Hyblaeidae described by Francis Walker in 1865.
