= Viviennea momyra =

Scientific classification
- Domain: Eukaryota
- Kingdom: Animalia
- Phylum: Arthropoda
- Class: Insecta
- Order: Lepidoptera
- Superfamily: Noctuoidea
- Family: Erebidae
- Subfamily: Arctiinae
- Genus: Viviennea
- Species: V. momyra

Binomial name
- Viviennea momyra (Gaede, 1928)

Synonyms
- Automolis momyra Gaede, 1928

Species of moth

Viviennea momyra is a moth in the family Erebidae first described by Max Gaede in 1928. It is found in Colombia.
