= Hyblaea bohemani =

Scientific classification
- Domain: Eukaryota
- Kingdom: Animalia
- Phylum: Arthropoda
- Class: Insecta
- Order: Lepidoptera
- Family: Hyblaeidae
- Genus: Hyblaea
- Species: H. bohemani

Binomial name
- Hyblaea bohemani Wallengren, 1856

Moth species in family Hyblaeidae

Hyblaea bohemani is a moth in the family Hyblaeidae, described by Wallengren in 1856.

Its colors mainly consist of different shades of brown.
