= Hyblaea euryzona =

Scientific classification
- Kingdom: Animalia
- Phylum: Arthropoda
- Clade: Pancrustacea
- Class: Insecta
- Order: Lepidoptera
- Family: Hyblaeidae
- Genus: Hyblaea
- Species: H. euryzona

Binomial name
- Hyblaea euryzona Prout, 1921

Moth species in family Hyblaeidae

Hyblaea euryzona is a moth in the family Hyblaeidae described by Prout in 1921.
