= Hyblaea occidentalium =

Scientific classification
- Domain: Eukaryota
- Kingdom: Animalia
- Phylum: Arthropoda
- Class: Insecta
- Order: Lepidoptera
- Family: Hyblaeidae
- Genus: Hyblaea
- Species: H. occidentalium

Binomial name
- Hyblaea occidentalium Holland, 1894

Moth species in family Hyblaeidae

Hyblaea occidentalium is a moth in the family Hyblaeidae described by William Jacob Holland in 1894.
