= Hyblaea tortricoides =

Scientific classification
- Domain: Eukaryota
- Kingdom: Animalia
- Phylum: Arthropoda
- Class: Insecta
- Order: Lepidoptera
- Family: Hyblaeidae
- Genus: Hyblaea
- Species: H. tortricoides

Binomial name
- Hyblaea tortricoides Guenée, 1852

Moth species in family Hyblaeidae

Hyblaea tortricoides is a moth in the family Hyblaeidae described by Achille Guenée in 1852.
