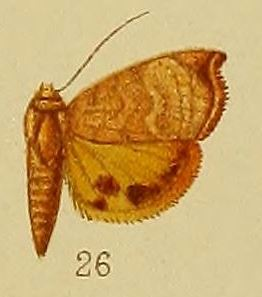

Scientific classification
- Domain: Eukaryota
- Kingdom: Animalia
- Phylum: Arthropoda
- Class: Insecta
- Order: Lepidoptera
- Family: Hyblaeidae
- Genus: Hyblaea
- Species: H. xanthia

Binomial name
- Hyblaea xanthia Hampson, 1910

= Hyblaea xanthia =

Moth species in family Hyblaeidae

Hyblaea xanthia is a moth in the family Hyblaeidae described by George Hampson in 1910. It is found in the Democratic Republic of the Congo (Katanga), the Seychelles (Aldabra), South Africa and Zambia.
