= Hyblaea canisigna =

Scientific classification
- Domain: Eukaryota
- Kingdom: Animalia
- Phylum: Arthropoda
- Class: Insecta
- Order: Lepidoptera
- Family: Hyblaeidae
- Genus: Hyblaea
- Species: H. canisigna

Binomial name
- Hyblaea canisigna Swinhoe, 1902

Moth species in family Hyblaeidae

Hyblaea canisigna is a moth in the family Hyblaeidae described by Swinhoe in 1902.
