= Uraga rubricollis =

Scientific classification
- Kingdom: Animalia
- Phylum: Arthropoda
- Class: Insecta
- Order: Lepidoptera
- Superfamily: Noctuoidea
- Family: Erebidae
- Subfamily: Arctiinae
- Genus: Uraga
- Species: U. rubricollis

Binomial name
- Uraga rubricollis Hampson, 1901

Species of moth

Uraga rubricollis is a moth in the subfamily Arctiinae. It was described by George Hampson in 1901. It is found in Colombia.
