= Glaucostola maroniensis =

Scientific classification
- Domain: Eukaryota
- Kingdom: Animalia
- Phylum: Arthropoda
- Class: Insecta
- Order: Lepidoptera
- Superfamily: Noctuoidea
- Family: Erebidae
- Subfamily: Arctiinae
- Genus: Glaucostola
- Species: G. maroniensis

Binomial name
- Glaucostola maroniensis Joicey & Talbot, 1918

Species of moth

Glaucostola maroniensis is a moth of the family Erebidae first described by James John Joicey and George Talbot in 1918. It is found in French Guiana, Brazil and Venezuela.
