= Scaptius cerdai =

Scientific classification
- Kingdom: Animalia
- Phylum: Arthropoda
- Class: Insecta
- Order: Lepidoptera
- Superfamily: Noctuoidea
- Family: Erebidae
- Subfamily: Arctiinae
- Genus: Scaptius
- Species: S. cerdai

Binomial name
- Scaptius cerdai Toulgoët, 1994

Species of moth

Scaptius cerdai is a moth in the family Erebidae. It was described by Hervé de Toulgoët in 1994. It is found in French Guiana.
