= Hyperandra diminuta =

Scientific classification
- Domain: Eukaryota
- Kingdom: Animalia
- Phylum: Arthropoda
- Class: Insecta
- Order: Lepidoptera
- Superfamily: Noctuoidea
- Family: Erebidae
- Subfamily: Arctiinae
- Genus: Hyperandra
- Species: H. diminuta

Binomial name
- Hyperandra diminuta Dognin, 1923

Synonyms
- Hyperandra appendiculata diminuta

Species of moth

Hyperandra diminuta is a moth of the subfamily Arctiinae first described by Paul Dognin in 1923. It is found in South America.
