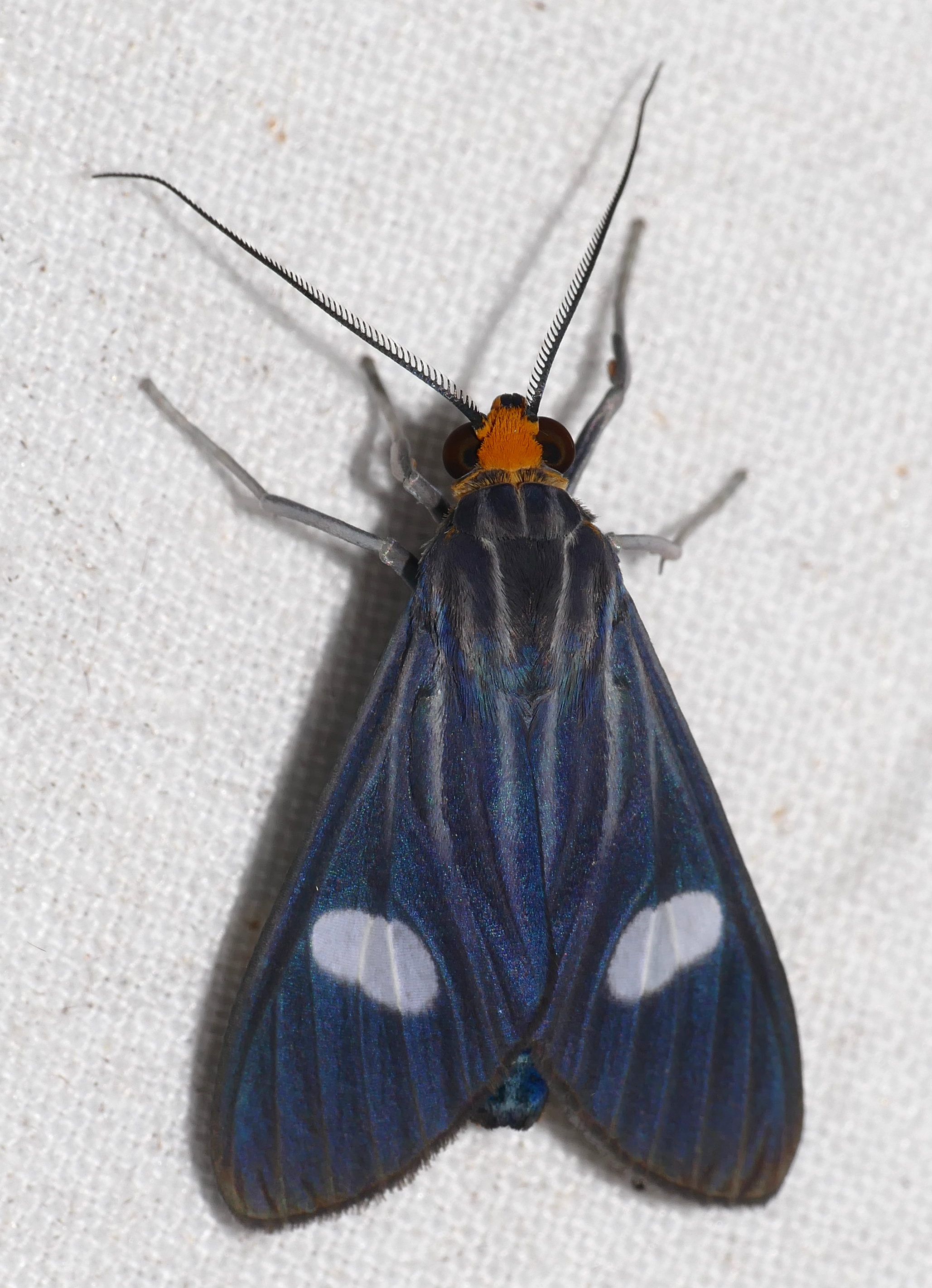

Scientific classification
- Kingdom: Animalia
- Phylum: Arthropoda
- Class: Insecta
- Order: Lepidoptera
- Superfamily: Noctuoidea
- Family: Erebidae
- Subfamily: Arctiinae
- Genus: Glaucostola
- Species: G. guttipalpis

Binomial name
- Glaucostola guttipalpis (Walker, 1856)

Synonyms
- Leucopsumis guttipalpis Walker, 1856; Ceratoplastis romula Druce, 1895

= Glaucostola guttipalpis =

Species of moth

Glaucostola guttipalpis is a moth of the family Erebidae first described by Francis Walker in 1856. It is found in French Guiana, Guyana, Brazil, Ecuador and Costa Rica.
