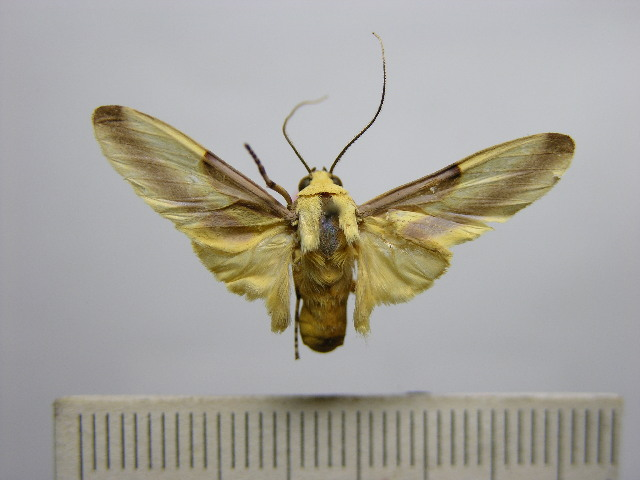

Scientific classification
- Domain: Eukaryota
- Kingdom: Animalia
- Phylum: Arthropoda
- Class: Insecta
- Order: Lepidoptera
- Superfamily: Noctuoidea
- Family: Erebidae
- Subfamily: Arctiinae
- Genus: Sutonocrea
- Species: S. lobifer

Binomial name
- Sutonocrea lobifer Herrich-Schäffer, 1855

Synonyms
- Creatonotos lobifer Herrich-Schäffer, [1855]; Automolis lobifer ab. chiriquica Strand, 1919

= Sutonocrea lobifer =

Species of moth

Sutonocrea lobifer is a moth in the family Erebidae. It was described by Gottlieb August Wilhelm Herrich-Schäffer in 1855. It is found in French Guiana, Brazil, Ecuador, Bolivia, Panama and Costa Rica.
