= Scaptius prumaloides =

Scientific classification
- Domain: Eukaryota
- Kingdom: Animalia
- Phylum: Arthropoda
- Class: Insecta
- Order: Lepidoptera
- Superfamily: Noctuoidea
- Family: Erebidae
- Subfamily: Arctiinae
- Genus: Scaptius
- Species: S. prumaloides

Binomial name
- Scaptius prumaloides (Rothschild, 1909)

Synonyms
- Automolis prumaloides Rothschild, 1909; Automolis geminipuncta Gaede, 1928

Species of moth

Scaptius prumaloides is a moth in the family Erebidae. It was described by Walter Rothschild in 1909. It is found in French Guiana, Brazil and Amazonas.
