= Uraga (moth) =

Scientific classification
- Kingdom: Animalia
- Phylum: Arthropoda
- Class: Insecta
- Order: Lepidoptera
- Superfamily: Noctuoidea
- Family: Erebidae
- Subfamily: Arctiinae
- Genus: Uraga; Walker, 1854

Genus of moths

Uraga is a genus of moths in the subfamily Arctiinae.

== Species ==
- Uraga haemorrhoa Walker, 1854
- Uraga hyalina Gaede, 1926
- Uraga rubricollis Hampson, 1901
- Uraga trifida Dognin, 1908
