= Scaptius chrysopera =

Scientific classification
- Domain: Eukaryota
- Kingdom: Animalia
- Phylum: Arthropoda
- Class: Insecta
- Order: Lepidoptera
- Superfamily: Noctuoidea
- Family: Erebidae
- Subfamily: Arctiinae
- Genus: Scaptius
- Species: S. chrysopera

Binomial name
- Scaptius chrysopera (Schaus, 1905)

Synonyms
- Automolis chrysopera Schaus, 1905; Automolis sanguistrigata Dognin, 1910; Scaptius sanguistrigata (Dognin, 1910)

Species of moth

Scaptius chrysopera is a moth in the family Erebidae. It was described by William Schaus in 1905. The moth is found in French Guiana.
