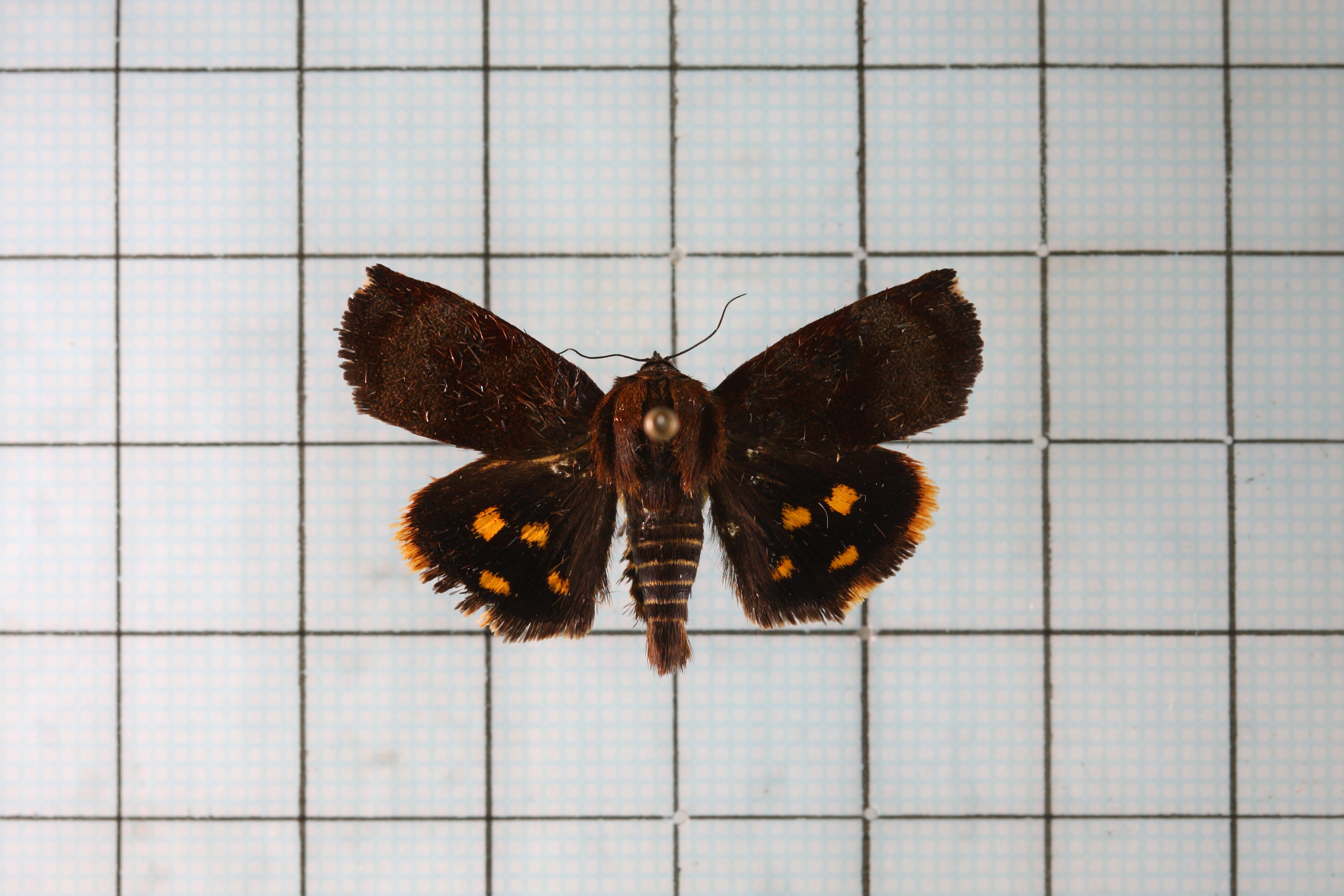

Scientific classification
- Domain: Eukaryota
- Kingdom: Animalia
- Phylum: Arthropoda
- Class: Insecta
- Order: Lepidoptera
- Family: Hyblaeidae
- Genus: Hyblaea
- Species: H. constellata

Binomial name
- Hyblaea constellata Guenée, 1852

Synonyms
- Hyblaea contraria Walker, 1865; Hyblaea triplagiata Guenée, 1852

= Hyblaea constellata =

Moth species in family Hyblaeidae

Hyblaea constellata is a moth in the family Hyblaeidae first described by Achille Guenée in 1852. It is found in India, Sri Lanka, south-east Asia, including China, Japan, Taiwan, Myanmar and Thailand. It is also found in Queensland, Australia.

== Description ==
The wingspan is about 40 mm. Forewings with excised outer margin below apex and excurved at center. Head and thorax dark olive-green in color. Abdomen black with orange segmental rings and crimson at sides towards extremity. Forewings are dark olive-green with dark specks, often with two antemedial yellowish-white suffused patches. There is a sub-apical bar and brown apical patch on costa. Hindwings black-brown, with two orange spots beyond lower angle of cell and two spots towards anal angle. Ventral side of forewings is black with orange around costa and inner margin. The base of cell, a band at end of it and one beyond it are all orange. Ventral side of hindwings orange suffused with crimson and with numerous black spots. A black spot can be seen at anal angle.

The larvae have been recorded feeding on Tectona grandis and Mallotus species.
