= Ischnocampa discopuncta =

Scientific classification
- Kingdom: Animalia
- Phylum: Arthropoda
- Class: Insecta
- Order: Lepidoptera
- Superfamily: Noctuoidea
- Family: Erebidae
- Subfamily: Arctiinae
- Genus: Ischnocampa
- Species: I. discopuncta

Binomial name
- Ischnocampa discopuncta (Hampson, 1901)

Synonyms
- Scepsis discopuncta Hampson, 1901; Ischnocampa tovia Dognin, 1904; Ischnocampa barbata Druce, 1905

Species of moth

Ischnocampa discopuncta is a moth of the family Erebidae. It was described by George Hampson in 1901. It is found in Bolivia and Peru.
