= Sutonocrea hoffmanni =

Scientific classification
- Domain: Eukaryota
- Kingdom: Animalia
- Phylum: Arthropoda
- Class: Insecta
- Order: Lepidoptera
- Superfamily: Noctuoidea
- Family: Erebidae
- Subfamily: Arctiinae
- Genus: Sutonocrea
- Species: S. hoffmanni

Binomial name
- Sutonocrea hoffmanni (Schaus, 1933)

Synonyms
- Automolis hoffmanni Schaus, 1933; Automolis devitta Rothschild, 1935

Species of moth

Sutonocrea hoffmanni is a moth in the family Erebidae. It was described by William Schaus in 1933. It is found in Brazil.
