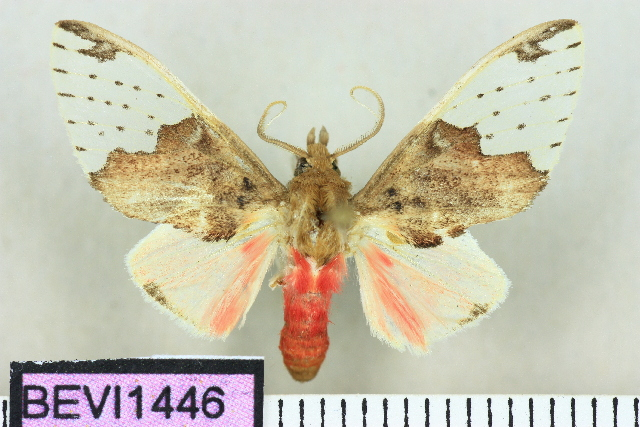

Scientific classification
- Domain: Eukaryota
- Kingdom: Animalia
- Phylum: Arthropoda
- Class: Insecta
- Order: Lepidoptera
- Superfamily: Noctuoidea
- Family: Erebidae
- Subfamily: Arctiinae
- Genus: Scaptius
- Species: S. pseudoprumala

Binomial name
- Scaptius pseudoprumala (Rothschild, 1935)

Synonyms
- Automolis pseudoprumala Rothschild, 1935

= Scaptius pseudoprumala =

Species of moth

Scaptius pseudoprumala is a moth in the family Erebidae. It was described by Walter Rothschild in 1935. It is found in the Brazilian state of Santa Catarina.
