= Scaptius neritosia =

Scientific classification
- Domain: Eukaryota
- Kingdom: Animalia
- Phylum: Arthropoda
- Class: Insecta
- Order: Lepidoptera
- Superfamily: Noctuoidea
- Family: Erebidae
- Subfamily: Arctiinae
- Genus: Scaptius
- Species: S. neritosia

Binomial name
- Scaptius neritosia (E. D. Jones, 1908)

Synonyms
- Automolis neritosia E. D. Jones, 1908

Species of moth

Scaptius neritosia is a moth in the family Erebidae. It was described by E. Dukinfield Jones in 1908. It is found in Brazil.
