= Viviennea euricosilvai =

Scientific classification
- Domain: Eukaryota
- Kingdom: Animalia
- Phylum: Arthropoda
- Class: Insecta
- Order: Lepidoptera
- Superfamily: Noctuoidea
- Family: Erebidae
- Subfamily: Arctiinae
- Genus: Viviennea
- Species: V. euricosilvai

Binomial name
- Viviennea euricosilvai (Travassos & Travassos, 1954)

Synonyms
- Rhipha euricosilvai Travassos & Travassos, 1954

Species of moth

Viviennea euricosilvai is a moth in the family Erebidae first described by Lauro Travassos and Lauro Pereira Travassos-Filho in 1954. It is found in Brazil.
