= Viviennea superba =

Scientific classification
- Domain: Eukaryota
- Kingdom: Animalia
- Phylum: Arthropoda
- Class: Insecta
- Order: Lepidoptera
- Superfamily: Noctuoidea
- Family: Erebidae
- Subfamily: Arctiinae
- Genus: Viviennea
- Species: V. superba

Binomial name
- Viviennea superba (H. Druce, 1883)

Synonyms
- Automolis superba H. Druce, 1883; Automolis sulfurea Schaus, 1905

Species of moth

Viviennea superba is a moth in the family Erebidae first described by Herbert Druce in 1883. It is found in Colombia, Ecuador and French Guiana.
