= Prosiccia albescens =

Scientific classification
- Kingdom: Animalia
- Phylum: Arthropoda
- Class: Insecta
- Order: Lepidoptera
- Superfamily: Noctuoidea
- Family: Erebidae
- Subfamily: Arctiinae
- Genus: Prosiccia
- Species: P. albescens

Binomial name
- Prosiccia albescens (Rothschild, 1912)

Synonyms
- Pasteosia albescens Rothschild, 1912

Species of moth

Prosiccia albescens is a moth in the family Erebidae first described by Walter Rothschild in 1912. It is found in New Guinea.
