= Glaucostola underwoodi =

Scientific classification
- Domain: Eukaryota
- Kingdom: Animalia
- Phylum: Arthropoda
- Class: Insecta
- Order: Lepidoptera
- Superfamily: Noctuoidea
- Family: Erebidae
- Subfamily: Arctiinae
- Genus: Glaucostola
- Species: G. underwoodi

Binomial name
- Glaucostola underwoodi Rothschild, 1910

Species of moth

Glaucostola underwoodi is a moth of the family Erebidae first described by Walter Rothschild in 1910. It is found in Costa Rica.
