= Ischnocampa lithosioides =

Scientific classification
- Domain: Eukaryota
- Kingdom: Animalia
- Phylum: Arthropoda
- Class: Insecta
- Order: Lepidoptera
- Superfamily: Noctuoidea
- Family: Erebidae
- Subfamily: Arctiinae
- Genus: Ischnocampa
- Species: I. lithosioides

Binomial name
- Ischnocampa lithosioides (Rothschild, 1912)

Synonyms
- Eucereon lithosioides Rothschild, 1912

Species of moth

Ischnocampa lithosioides is a moth of the family Erebidae. It was described by Walter Rothschild in 1912. It is found in Brazil.
