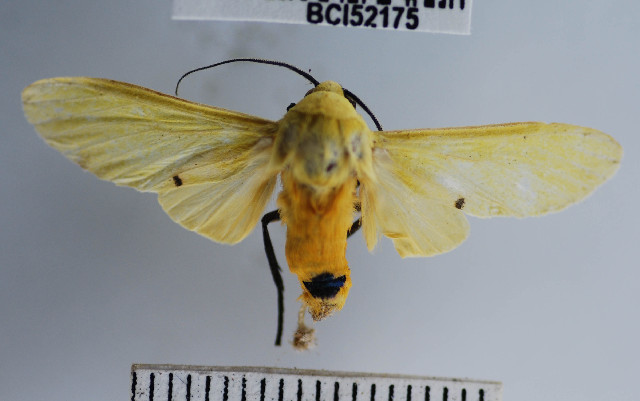
- Viviennea salma

Scientific classification
- Domain: Eukaryota
- Kingdom: Animalia
- Phylum: Arthropoda
- Class: Insecta
- Order: Lepidoptera
- Superfamily: Noctuoidea
- Family: Erebidae
- Subfamily: Arctiinae
- Subtribe: Phaegopterina
- Genus: Viviennea; Watson, 1975

= Viviennea =

Genus of moths

Viviennea is a genus of moths in the family Erebidae. The genus was described by Watson in 1975.

== Species ==
- Viviennea ardesiaca Rothschild, 1909
- Viviennea dolens H. Druce, 1904
- Viviennea euricosilvai Travassos & Travassos, 1954
- Viviennea flavicincta Herrich-Schäffer, 1855
- Viviennea griseonitens Rothschild, 1909
- Viviennea gyrata Schaus, 1920
- Viviennea moma Schaus, 1905
- Viviennea momyra Gaede, 1928
- Viviennea salma H. Druce, 1896
- Viviennea superba H. Druce, 1883
- Viviennea tegyra H. Druce, 1896
- Viviennea zonana Schaus, 1905
