= Ischnocampa tristis =

Scientific classification
- Domain: Eukaryota
- Kingdom: Animalia
- Phylum: Arthropoda
- Class: Insecta
- Order: Lepidoptera
- Superfamily: Noctuoidea
- Family: Erebidae
- Subfamily: Arctiinae
- Genus: Ischnocampa
- Species: I. tristis

Binomial name
- Ischnocampa tristis (Schaus, 1889)

Synonyms
- Opharus tristis Schaus, 1889; Opharus dolens Druce, 1894

Species of moth

Ischnocampa tristis is a moth of the family Erebidae. It was described by William Schaus in 1889. It is found in Mexico, Costa Rica and Brazil.
