= Sciopsyche tropica =

Scientific classification
- Kingdom: Animalia
- Phylum: Arthropoda
- Clade: Pancrustacea
- Class: Insecta
- Order: Lepidoptera
- Superfamily: Noctuoidea
- Family: Erebidae
- Subfamily: Arctiinae
- Genus: Sciopsyche
- Species: S. tropica

Binomial name
- Sciopsyche tropica (Walker, 1854)

Synonyms
- Euchromia tropica Walker, 1854; Sciopsyche cinerea Butler, 1876

Species of moth

Sciopsyche tropica is a moth in the subfamily Arctiinae. It was described by Francis Walker in 1854. It is found in Costa Rica, Honduras, Colombia, Paraguay and Brazil (Ega, Espirito Santo) and Argentina.
