= Uraga trifida =

Scientific classification
- Domain: Eukaryota
- Kingdom: Animalia
- Phylum: Arthropoda
- Class: Insecta
- Order: Lepidoptera
- Superfamily: Noctuoidea
- Family: Erebidae
- Subfamily: Arctiinae
- Genus: Uraga
- Species: U. trifida

Binomial name
- Uraga trifida Dognin, 1908

Species of moth

Uraga trifida is a moth in the subfamily Arctiinae. It was described by Paul Dognin in 1908. It is found in Peru.
