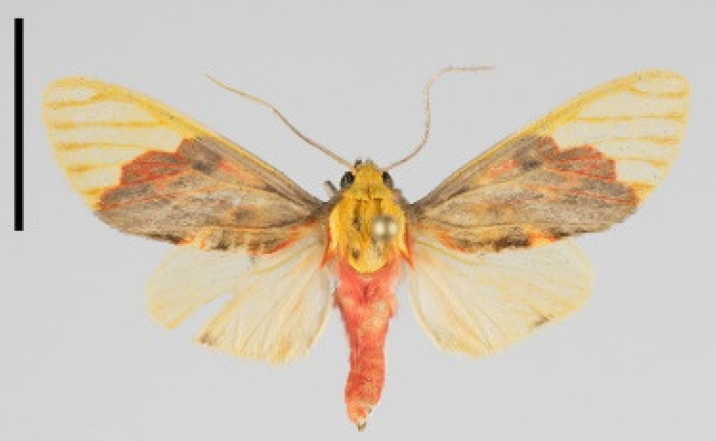

Scientific classification
- Domain: Eukaryota
- Kingdom: Animalia
- Phylum: Arthropoda
- Class: Insecta
- Order: Lepidoptera
- Superfamily: Noctuoidea
- Family: Erebidae
- Subfamily: Arctiinae
- Genus: Scaptius
- Species: S. sordida

Binomial name
- Scaptius sordida (Rothschild, 1909)

Synonyms
- Prumala sordida Rothschild, 1909; Automolis sordida pygmaea Rothschild, 1935

= Scaptius sordida =

Species of moth

Scaptius sordida is a moth in the family Erebidae. It was described by Walter Rothschild in 1909. It is found in Peru, Paraguay and Brazil.

== Subspecies ==
- Scaptius sordida sordida (Peru)
- Scaptius sordida pygmaea (Rothschild, 1935) (Brazil: Amazons)
