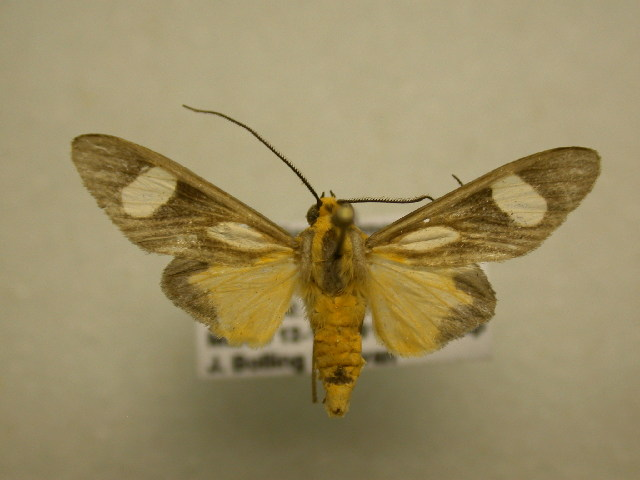

Scientific classification
- Domain: Eukaryota
- Kingdom: Animalia
- Phylum: Arthropoda
- Class: Insecta
- Order: Lepidoptera
- Superfamily: Noctuoidea
- Family: Erebidae
- Subfamily: Arctiinae
- Genus: Glaucostola
- Species: G. metaxantha

Binomial name
- Glaucostola metaxantha Schaus, 1905

= Glaucostola metaxantha =

Species of moth

Glaucostola metaxantha is a moth of the family Erebidae first described by William Schaus in 1905. It is found in Costa Rica.
