= Premolis semirufa =

Scientific classification
- Kingdom: Animalia
- Phylum: Arthropoda
- Class: Insecta
- Order: Lepidoptera
- Superfamily: Noctuoidea
- Family: Erebidae
- Subfamily: Arctiinae
- Genus: Premolis
- Species: P. semirufa

Binomial name
- Premolis semirufa (Walker, 1856)

Synonyms
- Halesidota semirufa Walker, 1856

Species of moth

Premolis semirufa is a moth in the family Erebidae first described by Francis Walker in 1856. It is found in French Guiana, Brazil, Ecuador, Peru and Panama.
