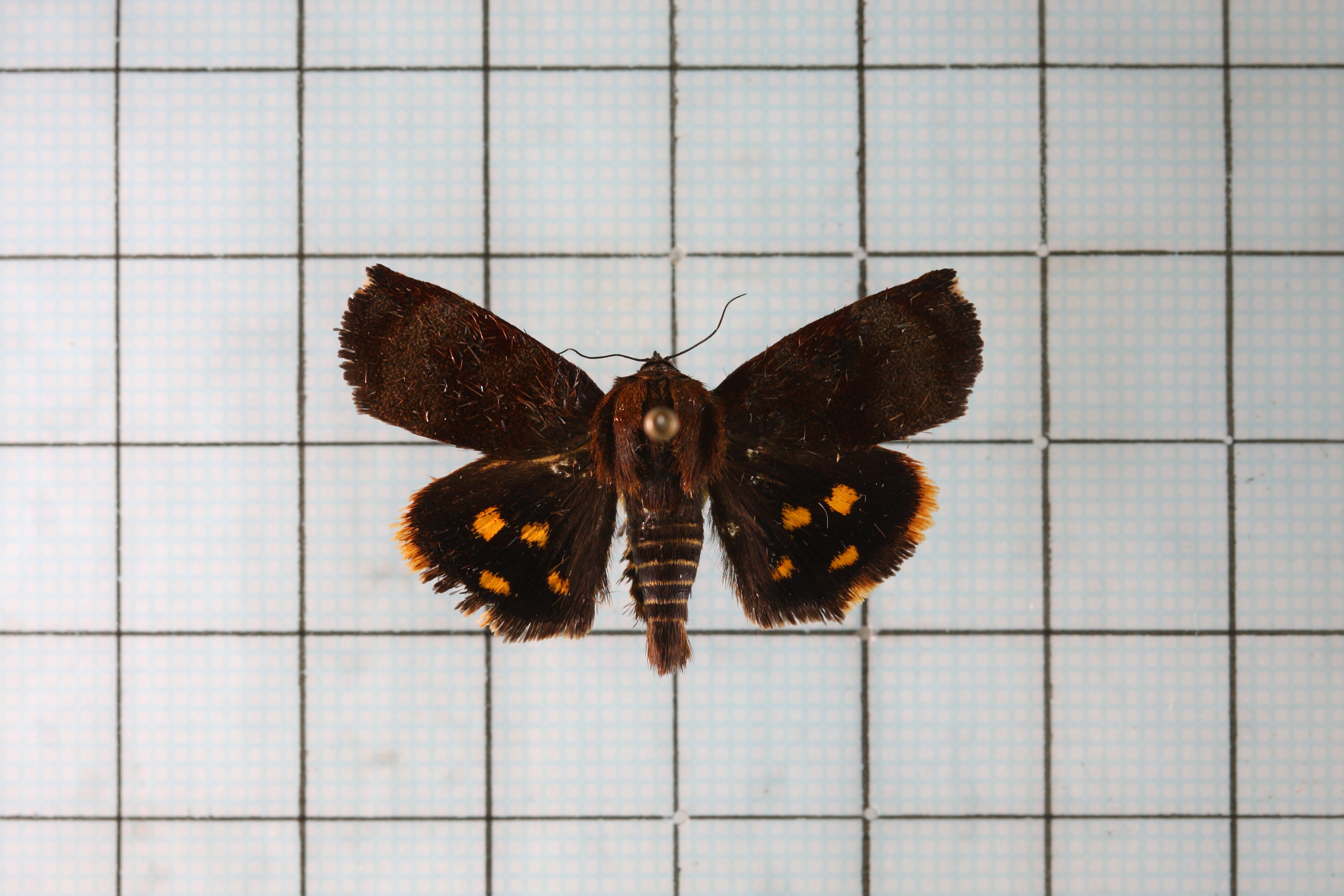
- Hyblaea constellata

Scientific classification
- Domain: Eukaryota
- Kingdom: Animalia
- Phylum: Arthropoda
- Class: Insecta
- Order: Lepidoptera
- Family: Hyblaeidae
- Genus: Hyblaea; Fabricius, 1793

Synonyms
- Aenigma Strecker, 1876; Nychophila Billberg, 1820

= Hyblaea =

Genus of moths

Hyblaea is a genus of moths of the family Hyblaeidae first described by Johan Christian Fabricius in 1793.

== Description ==
Head very small. Palpi porrect (extending forward) and rostriform (beak shaped). Antennae minutely ciliated in male. Thorax and abdomen smoothly scaled. Tibia clothed with long hairs and spineless. Forewings with costa arched near base, with lobed inner margin. The cell open. Veins 6 to 9 arise from close to angle of cell. Hindwings with open cell. Vein 8 anastomosing with vein 7 to near middle of cell.

== Taxonomy ==
The genus consists of the following species:

- Hyblaea amboinae
- Hyblaea asava
- Hyblaea aterrima
- Hyblaea bohemani
- Hyblaea canisigna
- Hyblaea castanea
- Hyblaea catocaloides
- Hyblaea constellata
- Hyblaea cruenta
- Hyblaea dilatata
- Hyblaea erycinoides
- Hyblaea esakii
- Hyblaea euryzona
- Hyblaea firmamentum
- Hyblaea flavifasciata
- Hyblaea flavipicta
- Hyblaea fontainei
- Hyblaea fortissima
- Hyblaea genuina
- Hyblaea hypocyanea
- Hyblaea ibidias
- Hyblaea inferna
- Hyblaea insulsa
- Hyblaea junctura
- Hyblaea madagascariensis
- Hyblaea occidentalium
- Hyblaea paulianii
- Hyblaea puera
- Hyblaea rosacea
- Hyblaea sanguinea
- Hyblaea saturata
- Hyblaea strigulata
- Hyblaea subcaerulea
- Hyblaea synaema
- Hyblaea tenebrionis
- Hyblaea tenuis
- Hyblaea tortricoides
- Hyblaea triplagiata
- Hyblaea vasa
- Hyblaea vitiensis
- Hyblaea xanthia
