= Scaptius ignivena =

Scientific classification
- Domain: Eukaryota
- Kingdom: Animalia
- Phylum: Arthropoda
- Class: Insecta
- Order: Lepidoptera
- Superfamily: Noctuoidea
- Family: Erebidae
- Subfamily: Arctiinae
- Genus: Scaptius
- Species: S. ignivena

Binomial name
- Scaptius ignivena (Joicey & Talbot, 1917)

Synonyms
- Automolis ignivena Joicey & Talbot, 1918

Species of moth

Scaptius ignivena is a moth in the family Erebidae. It was described by James John Joicey and George Talbot in 1917. It is found in Peru.
