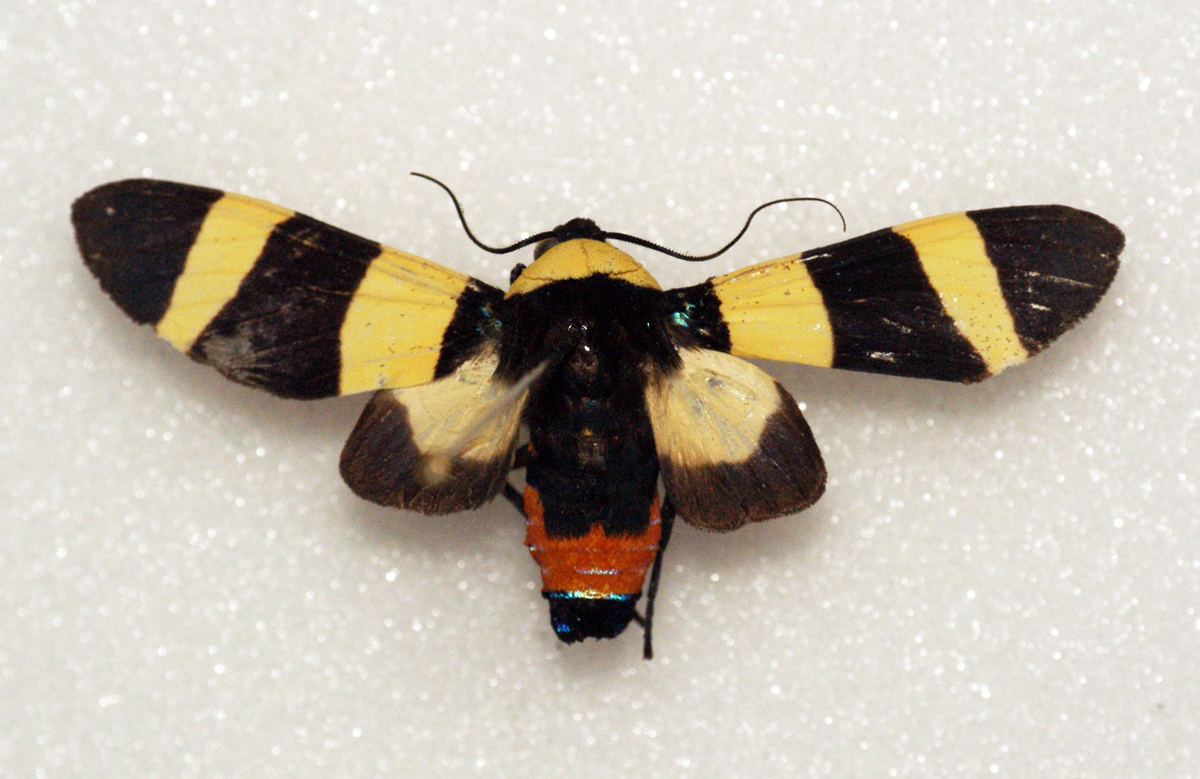

Scientific classification
- Domain: Eukaryota
- Kingdom: Animalia
- Phylum: Arthropoda
- Class: Insecta
- Order: Lepidoptera
- Superfamily: Noctuoidea
- Family: Erebidae
- Subfamily: Arctiinae
- Genus: Viviennea
- Species: V. moma

Binomial name
- Viviennea moma (Schaus, 1905)

Synonyms
- Automolis moma Schaus, 1905; Automolis moma tenuifascia Rothschild, 1917

= Viviennea moma =

Species of moth

Viviennea moma is a moth in the family Erebidae first described by William Schaus in 1905. It is found in Guyana, French Guiana, Brazil, Venezuela, Ecuador, Peru and Bolivia.
