= Viviennea tegyra =

Scientific classification
- Domain: Eukaryota
- Kingdom: Animalia
- Phylum: Arthropoda
- Class: Insecta
- Order: Lepidoptera
- Superfamily: Noctuoidea
- Family: Erebidae
- Subfamily: Arctiinae
- Genus: Viviennea
- Species: V. tegyra

Binomial name
- Viviennea tegyra (H. Druce, 1896)

Synonyms
- Automolis tegyra H. Druce, 1896

Species of moth

Viviennea tegyra is a moth in the family Erebidae first described by Herbert Druce in 1896. It is found in Panama.
