= Viviennea ardesiaca =

Scientific classification
- Domain: Eukaryota
- Kingdom: Animalia
- Phylum: Arthropoda
- Class: Insecta
- Order: Lepidoptera
- Superfamily: Noctuoidea
- Family: Erebidae
- Subfamily: Arctiinae
- Genus: Viviennea
- Species: V. ardesiaca

Binomial name
- Viviennea ardesiaca (Rothschild, 1909)

Synonyms
- Automolis ardesiaca Rothschild, 1909; Automolis schistaceus Rothschild, 1910; Automolis schistacea ab. subapicalis Rothschild, 1935

Species of moth

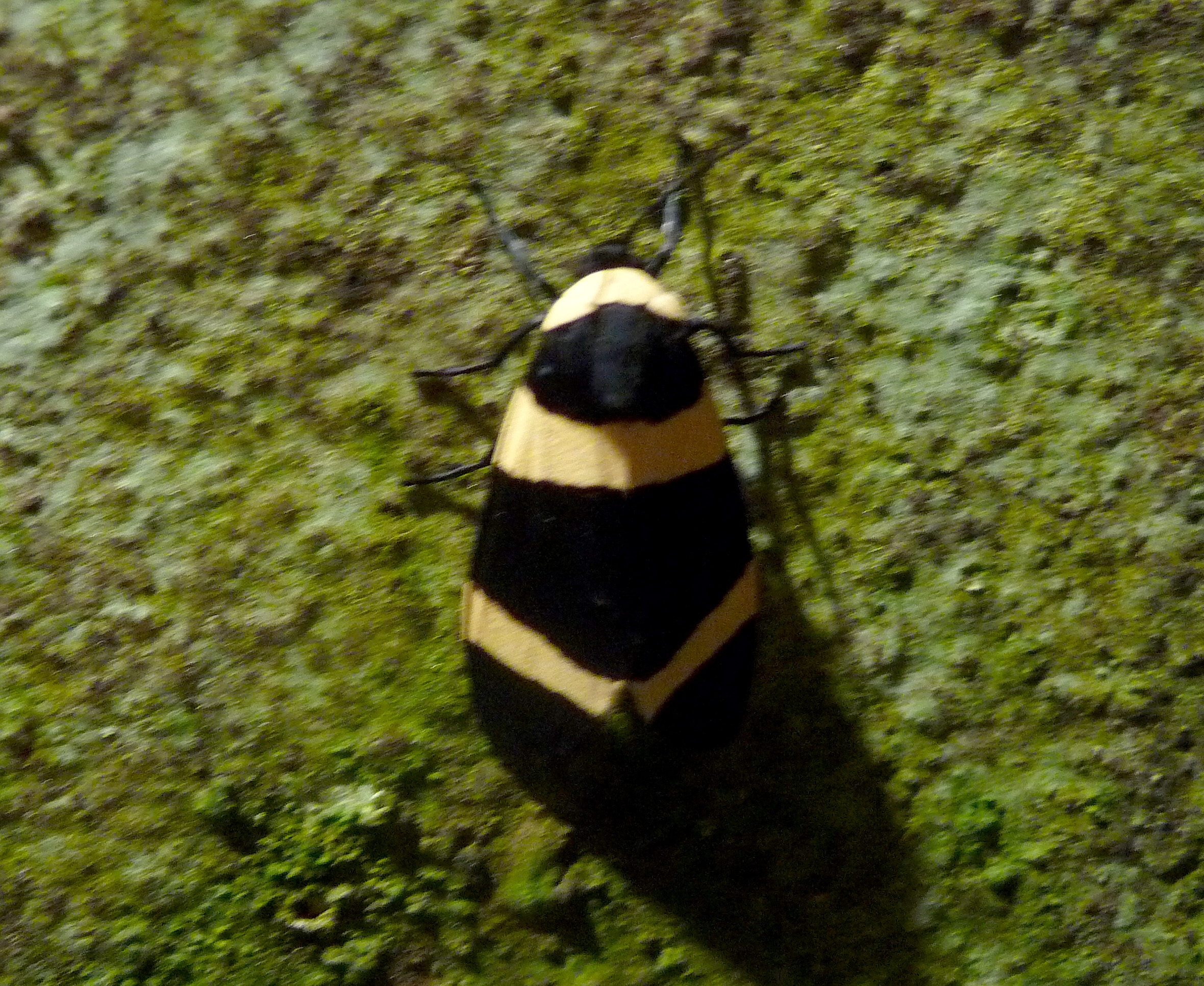
Cream-barred Tiger. Viviennea ardesiaca. Arctiinae.

Viviennea ardesiaca is a moth in the family Erebidae first described by Walter Rothschild in 1909. It is found in Costa Rica and Venezuela.
