= Ischnocampa mundator =

Scientific classification
- Domain: Eukaryota
- Kingdom: Animalia
- Phylum: Arthropoda
- Class: Insecta
- Order: Lepidoptera
- Superfamily: Noctuoidea
- Family: Erebidae
- Subfamily: Arctiinae
- Genus: Ischnocampa
- Species: I. mundator

Binomial name
- Ischnocampa mundator (H. Druce, 1884)

Synonyms
- Opharus mundator H. Druce, 1884

Species of moth

Ischnocampa mundator is a moth of the family Erebidae. It was described by Herbert Druce in 1884. It is found in Costa Rica.
