= Ischnocampa hemihyala =

Scientific classification
- Kingdom: Animalia
- Phylum: Arthropoda
- Class: Insecta
- Order: Lepidoptera
- Superfamily: Noctuoidea
- Family: Erebidae
- Subfamily: Arctiinae
- Genus: Ischnocampa
- Species: I. hemihyala

Binomial name
- Ischnocampa hemihyala Hampson, 1909

Species of moth

Ischnocampa hemihyala is a moth of the family Erebidae. It was described by George Hampson in 1909. It is found in Peru.
