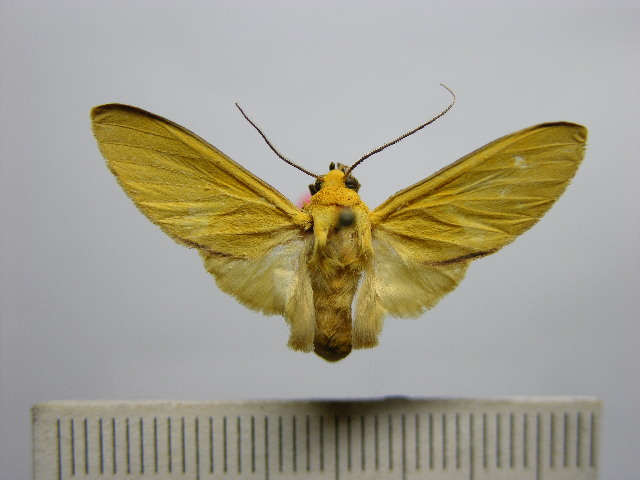

Scientific classification
- Domain: Eukaryota
- Kingdom: Animalia
- Phylum: Arthropoda
- Class: Insecta
- Order: Lepidoptera
- Superfamily: Noctuoidea
- Family: Erebidae
- Subfamily: Arctiinae
- Genus: Sutonocrea
- Species: S. fassli

Binomial name
- Sutonocrea fassli (Dognin, 1910)

Synonyms
- Automolis fassli Dognin, 1910

= Sutonocrea fassli =

Species of moth

Sutonocrea fassli is a moth in the family Erebidae. It was described by Paul Dognin in 1910. It is found in Colombia.
