= Viviennea zonana =

Scientific classification
- Domain: Eukaryota
- Kingdom: Animalia
- Phylum: Arthropoda
- Class: Insecta
- Order: Lepidoptera
- Superfamily: Noctuoidea
- Family: Erebidae
- Subfamily: Arctiinae
- Genus: Viviennea
- Species: V. zonana

Binomial name
- Viviennea zonana (Schaus, 1905)

Synonyms
- Automolis zonana Schaus, 1905; Automolis zonana ab. incompleta Seitz, 1921

Species of moth

Viviennea zonana is a moth in the family Erebidae first described by William Schaus in 1905. It is found in Ecuador, Peru, Bolivia and French Guiana.
