= Glaucostola simulans =

Scientific classification
- Kingdom: Animalia
- Phylum: Arthropoda
- Class: Insecta
- Order: Lepidoptera
- Superfamily: Noctuoidea
- Family: Erebidae
- Subfamily: Arctiinae
- Genus: Glaucostola
- Species: G. simulans

Binomial name
- Glaucostola simulans Toulgoët, 1987

Species of moth

Glaucostola simulans is a moth of the family Erebidae first described by Hervé de Toulgoët in 1987. It is found in French Guiana.
