= Hyperandra appendiculata =

Scientific classification
- Domain: Eukaryota
- Kingdom: Animalia
- Phylum: Arthropoda
- Class: Insecta
- Order: Lepidoptera
- Superfamily: Noctuoidea
- Family: Erebidae
- Subfamily: Arctiinae
- Genus: Hyperandra
- Species: H. appendiculata

Binomial name
- Hyperandra appendiculata (Herrich-Schäffer, [1856])

Synonyms
- Creatonotos appendiculatus Herrich-Schäffer, [1856]

Species of moth

Hyperandra appendiculata is a moth of the family Erebidae first described by Gottlieb August Wilhelm Herrich-Schäffer in 1856. It is found in French Guiana, Brazil and Venezuela.
