= Ischnocampa insitivum =

Scientific classification
- Domain: Eukaryota
- Kingdom: Animalia
- Phylum: Arthropoda
- Class: Insecta
- Order: Lepidoptera
- Superfamily: Noctuoidea
- Family: Erebidae
- Subfamily: Arctiinae
- Genus: Ischnocampa
- Species: I. insitivum

Binomial name
- Ischnocampa insitivum (Draudt, 1917)

Synonyms
- Eucereon insitivum Draudt, 1917

Species of moth

Ischnocampa insitivum is a moth of the family Erebidae. It was described by Max Wilhelm Karl Draudt in 1917. It is found in Colombia.
