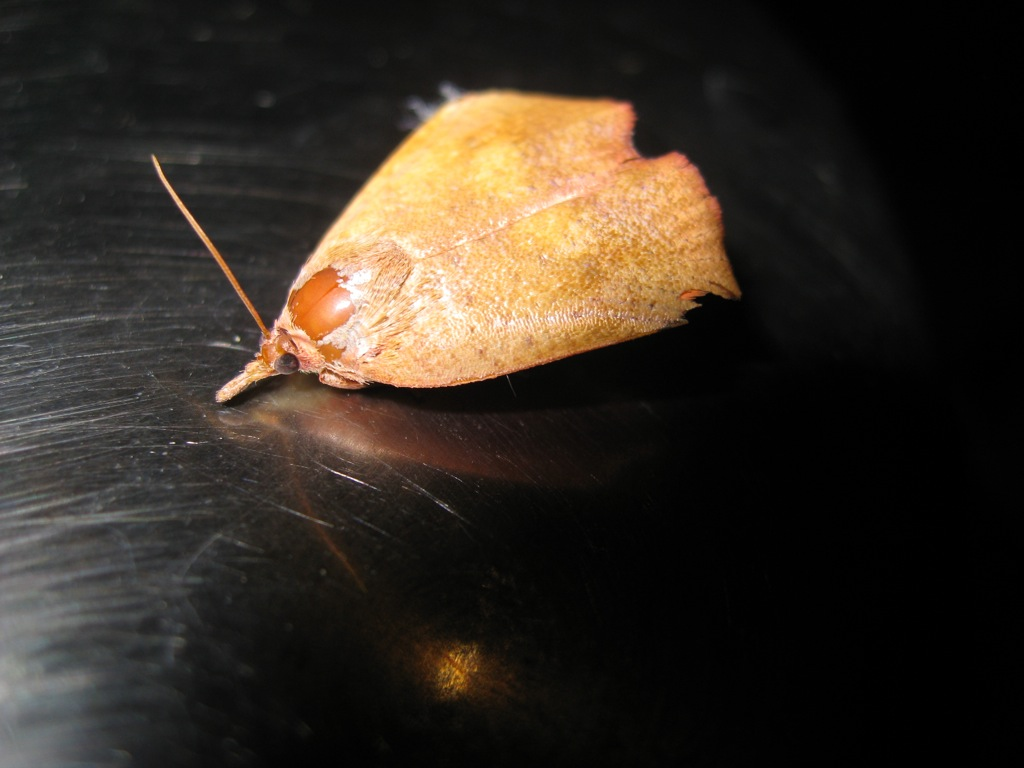

Scientific classification
- Domain: Eukaryota
- Kingdom: Animalia
- Phylum: Arthropoda
- Class: Insecta
- Order: Lepidoptera
- Family: Hyblaeidae
- Genus: Hyblaea
- Species: H. ibidias

Binomial name
- Hyblaea ibidias Turner, 1902

Synonyms
- Hyblaea joiceyi Prout, 1919; Hyblaea cruenta Turner

= Hyblaea ibidias =

Moth species in family Hyblaeidae

Hyblaea ibidias is a moth in the family Hyblaeidae. It is found in New South Wales, Australia.

The larvae have been recorded feeding on Pandorea jasminoides.

== Synonyms ==
Hyblaea joiceyi is listed as a synonym of this species by the Australian Faunal Directory, but is listed as a full species by The Global Lepidoptera Names Index. The Global Lepidoptera Names Index lists Hyblaea cruenta as a synonym of H. joiceyi.
