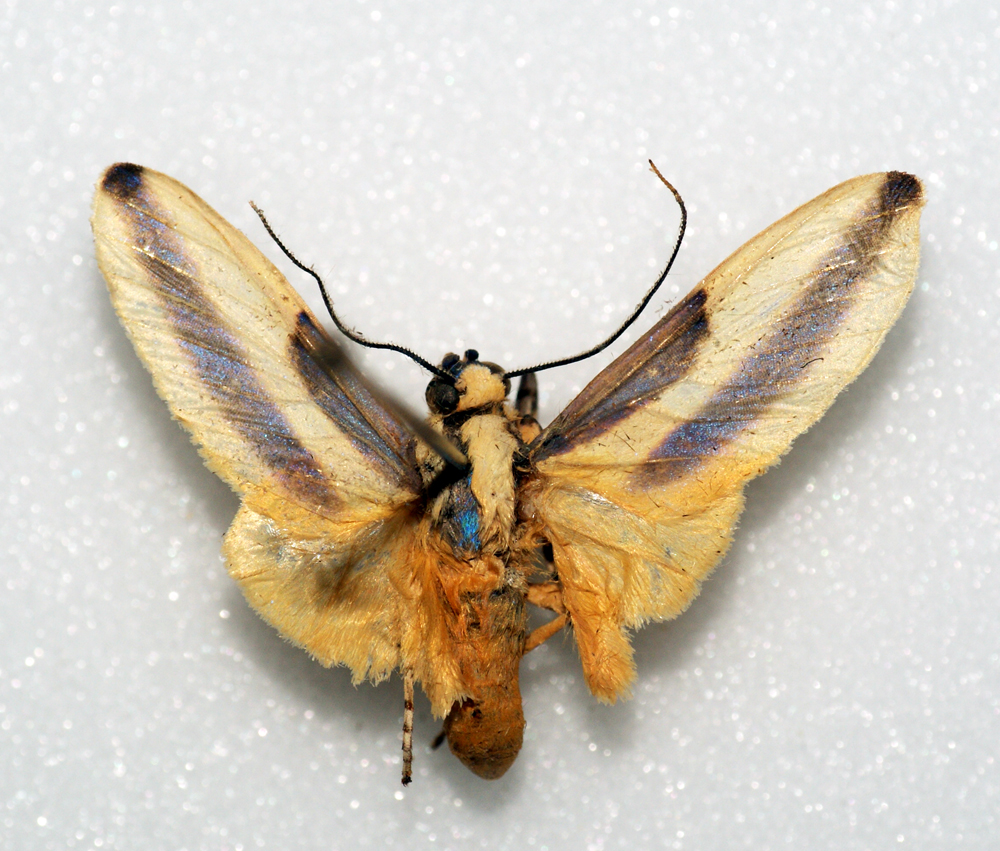

Scientific classification
- Kingdom: Animalia
- Phylum: Arthropoda
- Class: Insecta
- Order: Lepidoptera
- Superfamily: Noctuoidea
- Family: Erebidae
- Subfamily: Arctiinae
- Genus: Sutonocrea
- Species: S. reducta

Binomial name
- Sutonocrea reducta Walker, 1856

Synonyms
- Automolis reducta Walker, 1856; Automolis reducta f. paupera Gaede, 1928; Automolis reducta sordidior Rothschild, 1935; Automolis sordida Rothschild, 1917 (preocc. Rothschild, 1909)

= Sutonocrea reducta =

Species of moth

Sutonocrea reducta is a moth in the family Erebidae. It was described by Francis Walker in 1856. It is found in Brazil and Costa Rica.
