= Viviennea griseonitens =

Scientific classification
- Domain: Eukaryota
- Kingdom: Animalia
- Phylum: Arthropoda
- Class: Insecta
- Order: Lepidoptera
- Superfamily: Noctuoidea
- Family: Erebidae
- Subfamily: Arctiinae
- Genus: Viviennea
- Species: V. griseonitens

Binomial name
- Viviennea griseonitens (Rothschild, 1909)

Synonyms
- Automolis griseonitens Rothschild, 1909

Species of moth

Viviennea griseonitens is a moth in the family Erebidae first described by Walter Rothschild in 1909. It is found in Peru.
