= Premolis schausi =

Scientific classification
- Kingdom: Animalia
- Phylum: Arthropoda
- Clade: Pancrustacea
- Class: Insecta
- Order: Lepidoptera
- Superfamily: Noctuoidea
- Family: Erebidae
- Subfamily: Arctiinae
- Genus: Premolis
- Species: P. schausi

Binomial name
- Premolis schausi (Rothschild, 1909)

Synonyms
- Parevia schausi Rothschild, 1909

Species of moth

Premolis schausi is a species of moth in the subfamily Arctiinae that was first described by Walter Rothschild in 1909. It is found in Brazil.
