= Ischnocampa birchelli =

Scientific classification
- Domain: Eukaryota
- Kingdom: Animalia
- Phylum: Arthropoda
- Class: Insecta
- Order: Lepidoptera
- Superfamily: Noctuoidea
- Family: Erebidae
- Subfamily: Arctiinae
- Genus: Ischnocampa
- Species: I. birchelli

Binomial name
- Ischnocampa birchelli (H. Druce, 1901)

Synonyms
- Eucereon birchelli H. Druce, 1901

Species of moth

Ischnocampa birchelli is a moth of the family Erebidae. It was described by Herbert Druce in 1901. It is found in Colombia.
