= Erythrochrus =

Scientific classification
- Kingdom: Animalia
- Phylum: Arthropoda
- Class: Insecta
- Order: Lepidoptera
- Family: Hyblaeidae
- Genus: Erythrochrus; Herrich-Schäffer, 1855

Moth genus in family Hyblaeidae

Erythrochrus is a genus of moths in the family Hyblaeidae described by Gottlieb August Wilhelm Herrich-Schäffer in 1855.

== Species ==
- Erythrochrus bicolor
- Erythrochrus hyblaeiodes
- Erythrochrus notabilis
