= Premolis amaryllis =

Scientific classification
- Domain: Eukaryota
- Kingdom: Animalia
- Phylum: Arthropoda
- Class: Insecta
- Order: Lepidoptera
- Superfamily: Noctuoidea
- Family: Erebidae
- Subfamily: Arctiinae
- Genus: Premolis
- Species: P. amaryllis

Binomial name
- Premolis amaryllis Schaus, 1905

Synonyms

Species of moth

Premolis amaryllis is a moth in the family Erebidae first described by William Schaus in 1905. It is found in French Guiana.
