= Viviennea salma =

Scientific classification
- Kingdom: Animalia
- Phylum: Arthropoda
- Clade: Pancrustacea
- Class: Insecta
- Order: Lepidoptera
- Superfamily: Noctuoidea
- Family: Erebidae
- Subfamily: Arctiinae
- Genus: Viviennea
- Species: V. salma

Binomial name
- Viviennea salma (H. Druce, 1896)

Synonyms
- Automolis salma H. Druce, 1896; Automolis salma whitei Rothschild, 1935

Species of moth

Viviennea salma is a moth in the family Erebidae first described by Herbert Druce in 1896. It is found in Venezuela and Honduras.
