= Ischnocampa mamona =

Scientific classification
- Domain: Eukaryota
- Kingdom: Animalia
- Phylum: Arthropoda
- Class: Insecta
- Order: Lepidoptera
- Superfamily: Noctuoidea
- Family: Erebidae
- Subfamily: Arctiinae
- Genus: Ischnocampa
- Species: I. mamona

Binomial name
- Ischnocampa mamona (Dognin, 1892)

Synonyms
- Theages mamona Dognin, 1892

Species of moth

Ischnocampa mamona is a moth of the family Erebidae. It was described by Paul Dognin in 1892. It is found in Ecuador.
