= Hyperandra porioni =

Scientific classification
- Kingdom: Animalia
- Phylum: Arthropoda
- Class: Insecta
- Order: Lepidoptera
- Superfamily: Noctuoidea
- Family: Erebidae
- Subfamily: Arctiinae
- Genus: Hyperandra
- Species: H. porioni

Binomial name
- Hyperandra porioni Toulgoët, 1997

Species of moth

Hyperandra porioni is a moth of the subfamily Arctiinae. It is found in Brazil.
