= Scaptius ditissima =

Scientific classification
- Kingdom: Animalia
- Phylum: Arthropoda
- Class: Insecta
- Order: Lepidoptera
- Superfamily: Noctuoidea
- Family: Erebidae
- Subfamily: Arctiinae
- Genus: Scaptius
- Species: S. ditissima

Binomial name
- Scaptius ditissima Walker, 1855

Species of moth

Scaptius ditissima is a moth in the family Erebidae. It was described by Francis Walker in 1855. It is found in Panama, Brazil, Peru and Ecuador.
