= Prosiccia =

Scientific classification
- Kingdom: Animalia
- Phylum: Arthropoda
- Class: Insecta
- Order: Lepidoptera
- Superfamily: Noctuoidea
- Family: Erebidae
- Subfamily: Arctiinae
- Tribe: Lithosiini
- Genus: Prosiccia; Hampson, 1914

Genus of moths

Prosiccia is a genus of moths in the family Erebidae.

== Species ==
- Prosiccia albescens (Rothschild, 1912)
- Prosiccia trifasciata Gaede, 1925
