= Scaptius asteroides =

Scientific classification
- Domain: Eukaryota
- Kingdom: Animalia
- Phylum: Arthropoda
- Class: Insecta
- Order: Lepidoptera
- Superfamily: Noctuoidea
- Family: Erebidae
- Subfamily: Arctiinae
- Genus: Scaptius
- Species: S. asteroides

Binomial name
- Scaptius asteroides (Schaus, 1905)

Synonyms
- Automolis asteroides Schaus, 1905

Species of moth

Scaptius asteroides is a moth in the family Erebidae. It was described by William Schaus in 1905. It is found in French Guiana, Venezuela, Peru and Bolivia.
