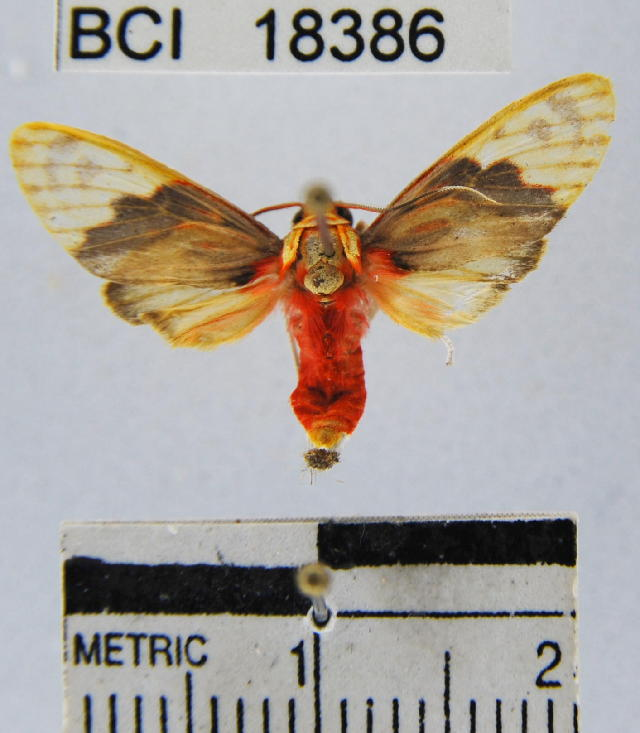

Scientific classification
- Domain: Eukaryota
- Kingdom: Animalia
- Phylum: Arthropoda
- Class: Insecta
- Order: Lepidoptera
- Superfamily: Noctuoidea
- Family: Erebidae
- Subfamily: Arctiinae
- Genus: Scaptius
- Species: S. obscurata

Binomial name
- Scaptius obscurata (Schaus, 1920)

Synonyms
- Automolis obscurata Schaus, 1920

= Scaptius obscurata =

Species of moth

Scaptius obscurata is a moth in the family Erebidae. It was described by William Schaus in 1920. It is found in Guatemala.
