= Glaucostola binotata =

Scientific classification
- Domain: Eukaryota
- Kingdom: Animalia
- Phylum: Arthropoda
- Class: Insecta
- Order: Lepidoptera
- Superfamily: Noctuoidea
- Family: Erebidae
- Subfamily: Arctiinae
- Genus: Glaucostola
- Species: G. binotata

Binomial name
- Glaucostola binotata Schaus, 1905

Species of moth

Glaucostola binotata is a moth of the family Erebidae first described by William Schaus in 1905. It is found in French Guiana, Suriname, Guyana, Ecuador and Peru.
