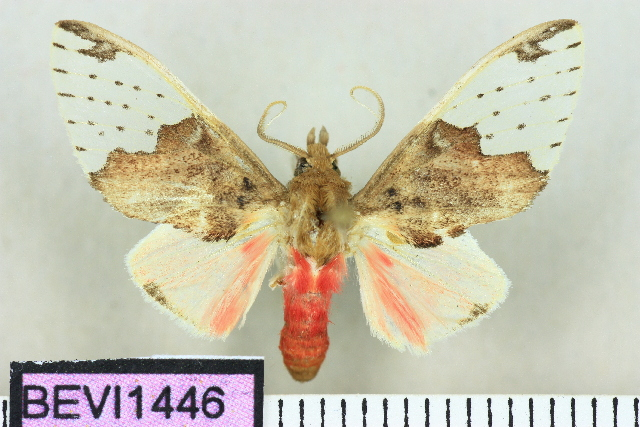
- Scaptius pseudoprumala

Scientific classification
- Kingdom: Animalia
- Phylum: Arthropoda
- Class: Insecta
- Order: Lepidoptera
- Superfamily: Noctuoidea
- Family: Erebidae
- Subfamily: Arctiinae
- Tribe: Arctiini
- Subtribe: Phaegopterina
- Genus: Scaptius; Walker, 1855

= Scaptius =

Genus of moths

Scaptius is a genus of moths in the family Erebidae erected by Francis Walker in 1855.

== Species ==
- Scaptius asteroides Schaus, 1905
- Scaptius cerdai Toulgoët, 1994
- Scaptius chrysopera Schaus, 1905
- Scaptius chrysoperina Gaede, 1928
- Scaptius ditissima Walker, 1855
- Scaptius holophaea (Hampson, 1905)
- Scaptius ignivena Joicey & Talbot, 1917
- Scaptius neritosia E. D. Jones, 1908
- Scaptius obscurata Schaus, 1920
- Scaptius prumaloides Rothschild, 1909
- Scaptius pseudoprumala Rothschild, 1935
- Scaptius sordida Rothschild, 1909
- Scaptius submarginalis Rothschild, 1909
- Scaptius vinasia Schaus, 1910

== Former species ==
- Scaptius sanguistrigata (Dognin, 1910)
