= Ischnocampa ferrea =

Scientific classification
- Domain: Eukaryota
- Kingdom: Animalia
- Phylum: Arthropoda
- Class: Insecta
- Order: Lepidoptera
- Superfamily: Noctuoidea
- Family: Erebidae
- Subfamily: Arctiinae
- Genus: Ischnocampa
- Species: I. ferrea

Binomial name
- Ischnocampa ferrea Dognin, 1914

Species of moth

Ischnocampa ferrea is a moth of the family Erebidae. It was described by Paul Dognin in 1914. It is found in Colombia.
