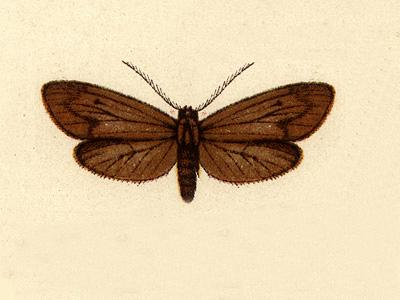

Scientific classification
- Domain: Eukaryota
- Kingdom: Animalia
- Phylum: Arthropoda
- Class: Insecta
- Order: Lepidoptera
- Superfamily: Noctuoidea
- Family: Erebidae
- Subfamily: Arctiinae
- Genus: Ischnocampa
- Species: I. griseola

Binomial name
- Ischnocampa griseola Rothschild, 1909

= Ischnocampa griseola =

Species of moth

Ischnocampa griseola is a moth of the family Erebidae. It is found on Jamaica.
