= Hyblaea synaema =

Scientific classification
- Domain: Eukaryota
- Kingdom: Animalia
- Phylum: Arthropoda
- Class: Insecta
- Order: Lepidoptera
- Family: Hyblaeidae
- Genus: Hyblaea
- Species: H. synaema

Binomial name
- Hyblaea synaema Turner, 1902

Moth species in family Hyblaeidae

Hyblaea synaema is a moth in the family Hyblaeidae. It is found in Queensland, Australia.
