= Ischnocampa rubrosignata =

Scientific classification
- Domain: Eukaryota
- Kingdom: Animalia
- Phylum: Arthropoda
- Class: Insecta
- Order: Lepidoptera
- Superfamily: Noctuoidea
- Family: Erebidae
- Subfamily: Arctiinae
- Genus: Ischnocampa
- Species: I. rubrosignata

Binomial name
- Ischnocampa rubrosignata Reich, 1936

Species of moth

Ischnocampa rubrosignata is a moth of the family Erebidae. It was described by Reich in 1936. It is found in Colombia.
