= Ischnocampa huigra =

Scientific classification
- Domain: Eukaryota
- Kingdom: Animalia
- Phylum: Arthropoda
- Class: Insecta
- Order: Lepidoptera
- Superfamily: Noctuoidea
- Family: Erebidae
- Subfamily: Arctiinae
- Genus: Ischnocampa
- Species: I. huigra

Binomial name
- Ischnocampa huigra Schaus, 1933

Species of moth

Ischnocampa huigra is a moth of the family Erebidae. It was described by William Schaus in 1933. It is found in Ecuador.
