= Viviennea gyrata =

Scientific classification
- Domain: Eukaryota
- Kingdom: Animalia
- Phylum: Arthropoda
- Class: Insecta
- Order: Lepidoptera
- Superfamily: Noctuoidea
- Family: Erebidae
- Subfamily: Arctiinae
- Genus: Viviennea
- Species: V. gyrata

Binomial name
- Viviennea gyrata (Schaus, 1920)

Synonyms
- Automolis gyrata Schaus, 1920

Species of moth

Viviennea gyrata is a moth in the family Erebidae first described by William Schaus in 1920. It is found in Guatemala.
