= Ischnocampa tolimensis =

Scientific classification
- Domain: Eukaryota
- Kingdom: Animalia
- Phylum: Arthropoda
- Class: Insecta
- Order: Lepidoptera
- Superfamily: Noctuoidea
- Family: Erebidae
- Subfamily: Arctiinae
- Genus: Ischnocampa
- Species: I. tolimensis

Binomial name
- Ischnocampa tolimensis Rothschild, 1916

Species of moth

Ischnocampa tolimensis is a moth of the family Erebidae. It was described by Walter Rothschild in 1916. It is found in Colombia.
