= Glaucostola flavida =

Scientific classification
- Domain: Eukaryota
- Kingdom: Animalia
- Phylum: Arthropoda
- Class: Insecta
- Order: Lepidoptera
- Superfamily: Noctuoidea
- Family: Erebidae
- Subfamily: Arctiinae
- Genus: Glaucostola
- Species: G. flavida

Binomial name
- Glaucostola flavida Schaus, 1905

Synonyms
- Automolis subtussisignata Bryk, 1953

Species of moth

Glaucostola flavida is a moth of the family Erebidae first described by William Schaus in 1905. It is found in French Guiana, Guyana and Trinidad.
