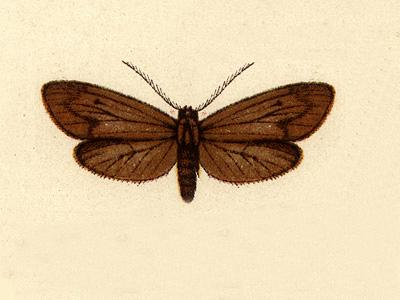
- Ischnocampa griseola

Scientific classification
- Domain: Eukaryota
- Kingdom: Animalia
- Phylum: Arthropoda
- Class: Insecta
- Order: Lepidoptera
- Superfamily: Noctuoidea
- Family: Erebidae
- Subfamily: Arctiinae
- Subtribe: Phaegopterina
- Genus: Ischnocampa; Felder, 1874

= Ischnocampa =

Genus of moths

Ischnocampa is a genus of moths in the family Erebidae.

== Species ==
- Ischnocampa achrosis Dognin, 1912
- Ischnocampa affinis Rothschild, 1935
- Ischnocampa albiceps Dognin, 1911
- Ischnocampa angulosa Gaede, 1928
- Ischnocampa birchelli Druce, 1901
- Ischnocampa brunneitincta Rothschild, 1909
- Ischnocampa celer Schaus, 1892
- Ischnocampa discopuncta Hampson, 1901
- Ischnocampa ferrea Dognin, 1914
- Ischnocampa floccosa Rothschild, 1909
- Ischnocampa griseola Rothschild, 1909
- Ischnocampa hemihyala Hampson, 1909
- Ischnocampa huigra Schaus, 1933
- Ischnocampa ignava Dognin, 1912
- Ischnocampa insitivum Draudt, 1917
- Ischnocampa lithosioides Rothschild, 1912
- Ischnocampa lugubris Schaus, 1892
- Ischnocampa mamona Dognin, 1892
- Ischnocampa mundator Druce, 1884
- Ischnocampa nubilosa Dognin, 1892
- Ischnocampa obscurata Hampson, 1901
- Ischnocampa perirrotata Hampson, 1901
- Ischnocampa pseudomathani Gaede, 1928
- Ischnocampa remissa Dognin, 1902
- Ischnocampa rubrosignata Reich., 1936
- Ischnocampa sordida Felder, 1874
- Ischnocampa sordidior Rothschild, 1909
- Ischnocampa styx E. D. Jones, 1914
- Ischnocampa tolimensis Rothschild, 1916
- Ischnocampa tristis Schaus, 1889
