= Viviennea dolens =

Scientific classification
- Domain: Eukaryota
- Kingdom: Animalia
- Phylum: Arthropoda
- Class: Insecta
- Order: Lepidoptera
- Superfamily: Noctuoidea
- Family: Erebidae
- Subfamily: Arctiinae
- Genus: Viviennea
- Species: V. dolens

Binomial name
- Viviennea dolens (H. Druce, 1904)

Synonyms
- Automolis dolens H. Druce, 1904; Automolis dolens f. indefecta Jörgensen, 1932; Automolis tegulata Rothschild, 1933; Automolis immarginata Rothschild, 1933; Automolis tegulata aurantiaca Rothschild, 1935; Automolis immarginata ab. flava Rothschild, 1935

Species of moth

Viviennea dolens is a moth in the family Erebidae first described by Herbert Druce in 1904. It is found in Paraguay and the Brazilian state of Santa Catarina.
