= Ischnocampa sordida =

Scientific classification
- Domain: Eukaryota
- Kingdom: Animalia
- Phylum: Arthropoda
- Class: Insecta
- Order: Lepidoptera
- Superfamily: Noctuoidea
- Family: Erebidae
- Subfamily: Arctiinae
- Genus: Ischnocampa
- Species: I. sordida

Binomial name
- Ischnocampa sordida Felder, 1874

Species of moth

Ischnocampa sordida is a moth of the family Erebidae. It was described by Felder in 1874. It is found in Colombia, Bolivia and Peru.
