= Hyperandra =

Scientific classification
- Kingdom: Animalia
- Phylum: Arthropoda
- Class: Insecta
- Order: Lepidoptera
- Superfamily: Noctuoidea
- Family: Erebidae
- Subfamily: Arctiinae
- Tribe: Arctiini
- Subtribe: Phaegopterina
- Genus: Hyperandra; Hampson, 1901

Genus of moths

Hyperandra is a genus of moths in the family Erebidae. The genus was erected by George Hampson in 1901.

== Species ==
- Hyperandra appendiculata
- Hyperandra diminuta
- Hyperandra excavata
- Hyperandra novata
- Hyperandra porioni
