= Viviennea flavicincta =

Scientific classification
- Domain: Eukaryota
- Kingdom: Animalia
- Phylum: Arthropoda
- Class: Insecta
- Order: Lepidoptera
- Superfamily: Noctuoidea
- Family: Erebidae
- Subfamily: Arctiinae
- Genus: Viviennea
- Species: V. flavicincta

Binomial name
- Viviennea flavicincta (Herrich-Schäffer, [1855])

Synonyms
- Creatonotus flavicinctus Herrich-Schäffer, [1855]; Automolis angulosa Walker, 1856; Automolis immaculata Rothschild, 1933; Automolis spitzi Rothschild, 1935; Viviennea flavicinctus (Herrich-Schäffer, [1855])

Species of moth

Viviennea flavicincta is a moth in the family Erebidae first described by Gottlieb August Wilhelm Herrich-Schäffer in 1855. It is found in Colombia and Brazil.
