= Uraga haemorrhoa =

Scientific classification
- Kingdom: Animalia
- Phylum: Arthropoda
- Class: Insecta
- Order: Lepidoptera
- Superfamily: Noctuoidea
- Family: Erebidae
- Subfamily: Arctiinae
- Genus: Uraga
- Species: U. haemorrhoa

Binomial name
- Uraga haemorrhoa Walker, 1854

Species of moth

Uraga haemorrhoa is a moth in the subfamily Arctiinae. It was described by Francis Walker in 1854. It is found on Jamaica.
