= Hyperandra novata =

Scientific classification
- Domain: Eukaryota
- Kingdom: Animalia
- Phylum: Arthropoda
- Class: Insecta
- Order: Lepidoptera
- Superfamily: Noctuoidea
- Family: Erebidae
- Subfamily: Arctiinae
- Genus: Hyperandra
- Species: H. novata

Binomial name
- Hyperandra novata (Dognin, 1924)

Synonyms
- Automolis novata Dognin, 1924; Sutonocrea novata; Hyperandra cezari Almeida, 1968

Species of moth

Hyperandra novata is a moth of the subfamily Arctiinae first described by Paul Dognin in 1924. It is found in Brazil.
