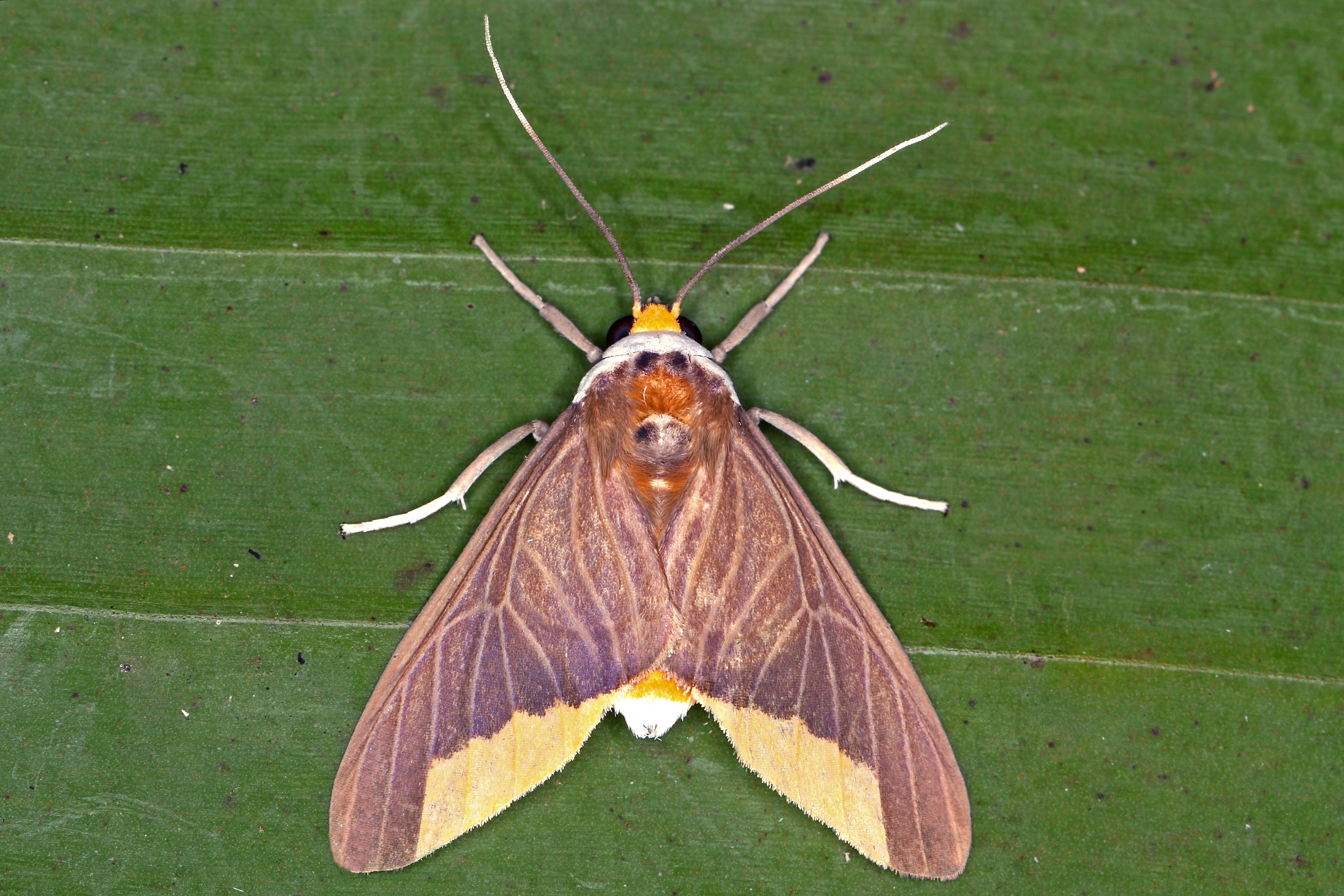

Scientific classification
- Kingdom: Animalia
- Phylum: Arthropoda
- Clade: Pancrustacea
- Class: Insecta
- Order: Lepidoptera
- Superfamily: Noctuoidea
- Family: Erebidae
- Subfamily: Arctiinae
- Genus: Hyperandra
- Species: H. excavata

Binomial name
- Hyperandra excavata (Forbes, 1939)

Synonyms
- Premolis excavata Forbes, 1939; Hyperandra laguerrei Toulgoët, 2001

= Hyperandra excavata =

Species of moth

Hyperandra excavata is a moth of the family Erebidae first described by William Trowbridge Merrifield Forbes in 1939. It is found in Panama and Nicaragua.
