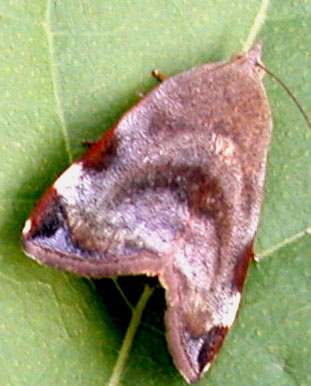

Scientific classification
- Kingdom: Animalia
- Phylum: Arthropoda
- Clade: Pancrustacea
- Class: Insecta
- Order: Lepidoptera
- Family: Hyblaeidae
- Genus: Hyblaea
- Species: H. puera

Binomial name
- Hyblaea puera (Cramer, 1777)

Synonyms
- Noctua puera Cramer, 1777; Noctua saga Fabricius, 1787; Noctua unxia Hübner, 1813; Heliothis apricans Boisduval, 1833; Nabara limacodella Walker, 1866; Aenigma mirificum Strecker, 1876; Hyblaea puera nigra Stebbing, 1903

= Hyblaea puera =

Moth species in family Hyblaeidae

Hyblaea puera, the teak defoliator, is a moth and cryptic species complex native to South Asia and Southeast Asia, though also reported from Central America and Africa. It was first described by Pieter Cramer in 1777. The caterpillar feeds on teak and other trees, and considered to be one of the major teak pests around the world.

== Distribution and habitat ==
Hyblaea puera occurs in forests across southern Asia from India, Sri Lanka and Bangladesh, and southeast Asia from Thailand to New Guinea, and north Queensland in Australia. The species has been reported from Guadeloupe, and Suriname.

== Description ==
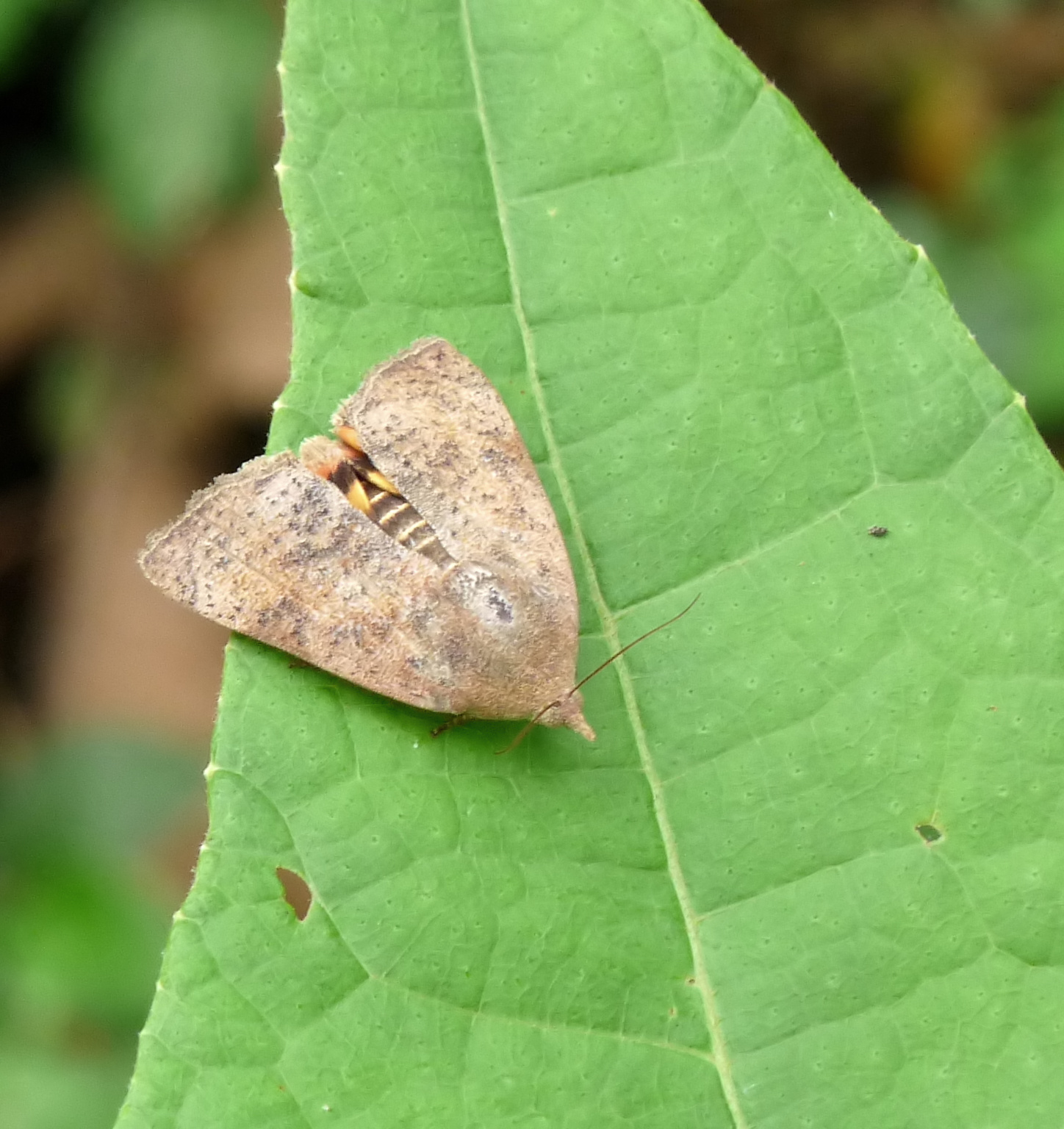
Hyblaea puera in Kerala; the black and orange-yellow hindwings are visible under the greyish-brown forewings.

The adult moths are comparatively small, with a wingspan of 3–4 cm (1.2–1.6 in), and have a characteristic resting posture that conceals the black and orange-yellow hindwings under the greyish-brown forewings. There are five larval instars, with the last instar measuring about 3.5–4.5 cm (1.4–1.8 in), and there is considerable colour variation in the fourth and fifth instars; the body may be either wholly black or dark greyish to black, with longitudinal coloured bands which may include a dorsal orange or ocherous band and lateral white lines.

The instars have characteristic feeding methods: the first and second instars mainly feed on the leaf's surface, while in subsequent instars, the larvae cuts out a leaf flap, usually at the edge of the leaf, folds it over, fastens it with silk, and feeds from within. The entire leaf, excluding the major veins of tender leaves, is eaten, but more veins are left in older leaves.

== Ecology ==
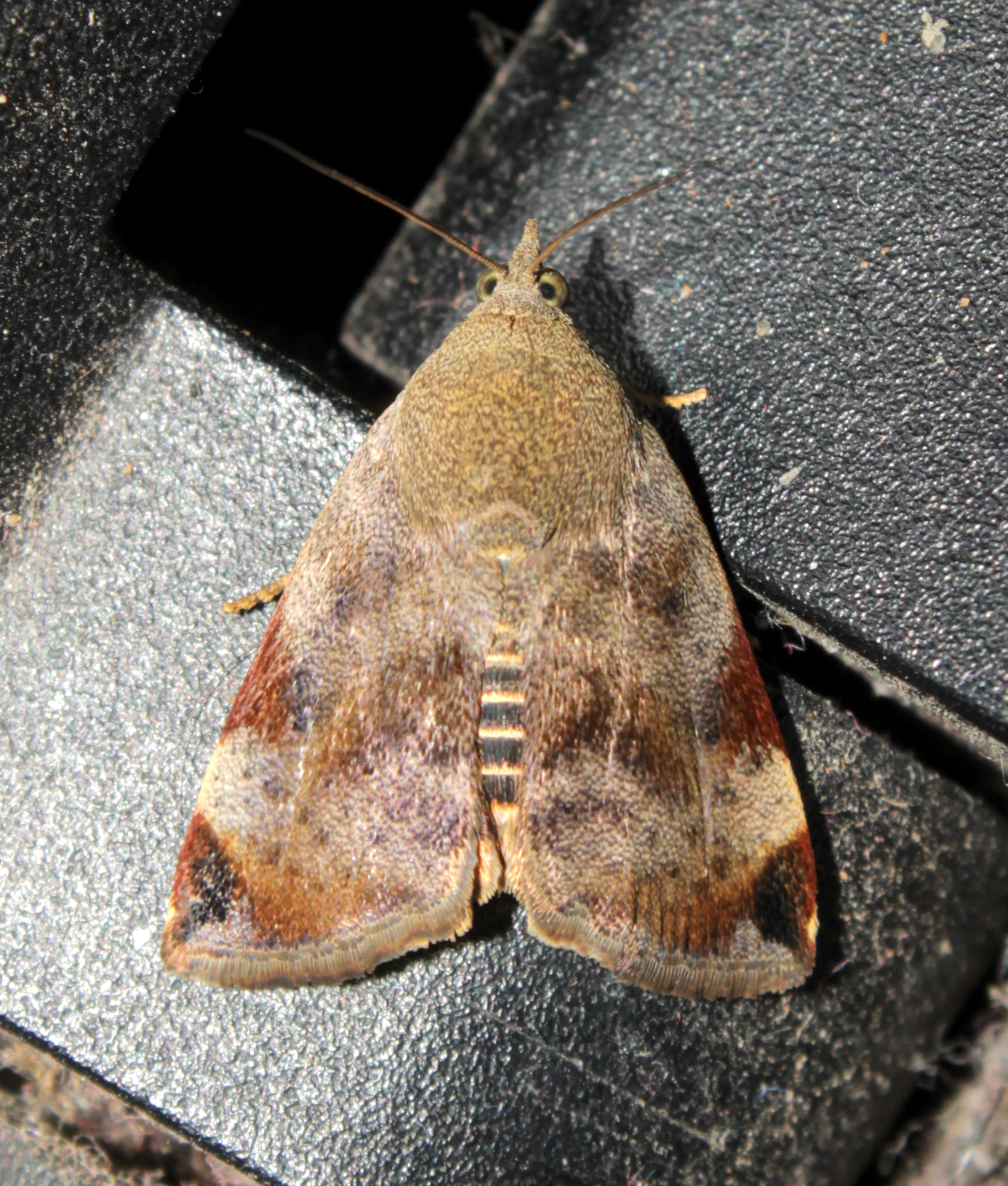
In Kanjirappally, Kerala.

The teak defoliator is present year round in teak plantations, but in varying population densities. During the period of natural defoliation of teak (November, December, and January), the pest density is very low (endemic). Every year high-intensity outbreaks of teak defoliator occur immediately after the premonsoon showers in late February or early march in Kerala. These centres are highly localized outbreaks which represent the transitional stage between very sparse endemic population and high density outbreak population. These centres will be 5,000 to 15,000 m^{2} (54,000 to 161,000 sq ft) in area and are characterized by heavy tree top infestation. The months of April, May, June, and July witness a series of large outbreaks. During late July or September, the population declines to the endemic level. In some years, there will be fresh outbreaks during October. From then on until the next year, the population remains at the endemic level.

=== Life cycle ===
Males and females emerge more or less simultaneously and mating takes place within a couple of days. Eggs are laid on tender new leaves, placed singly near the veins, and usually on the undersurface. They are oval, flat, and white and measure about 1 mm in length. About 500 eggs are laid per female with a recorded maximum of 1000. Larvae hatch in about two days. Under the optimal conditions, the larval period lasts 10 to 12 days. A recent study revealed the existence of density-dependent colour polyphenism and resistance build-up against invading baculovirus by H. puera larvae. The mature larvae descend to the ground on silken threads and pupate under a thin layer of leaf litter or soil, within loosely built cocoons made of dry or decayed leaves, or soil particles held together with silk. Pupation may sometimes occur within green leaves of other plants in the under growth, folded or juxtaposed with silk. On Avicennia mangroves the caterpillars pupate inside the cases made out of the host plant leaves themselves, which is probably an adaptive trait acquired by the species for surviving in the hostile mangrove environment, since pupation is not possible in the muddy and inundated soils of mangroves. The average pupal period lasts six to eight days under optimal conditions. There is no evidence of hibernation or aestivation of the pupa.

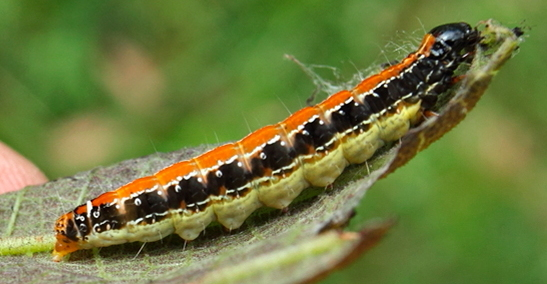
Larva

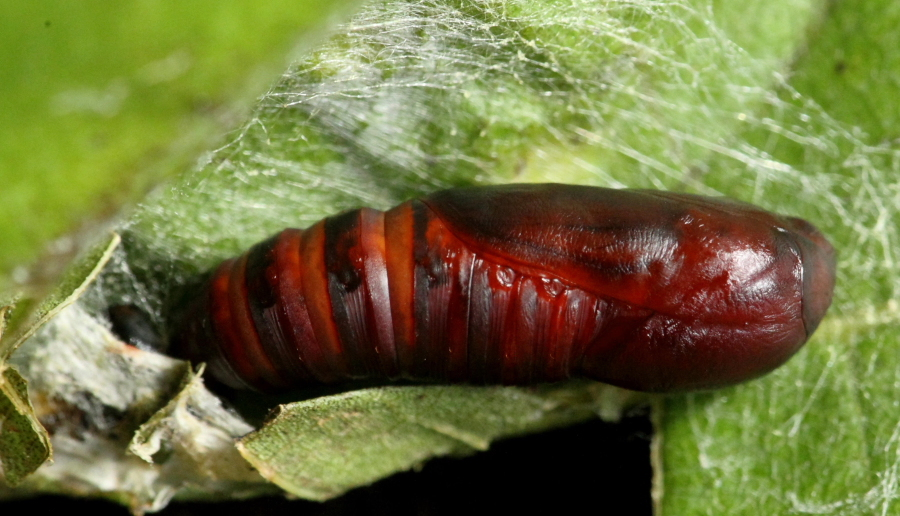
Pupa

=== Natural control ===
Wasps, spiders, birds, and bonnet macaques eat H. puera. Forty-eight species of birds have been recorded as feeding on teak defoliator larvae during large-scale outbreaks.

The main parasitoid species attacking teak defoliators include the tachinid Palexorisa solennis, a eulophid Sympiesis hyblaeae, the chalicid Brachymeria lasus and the three ichneumonids, Eriborus gardneri, Stictopisthus sp. and Echthromorpha agrestoria notulatoria. B. lasus is a pupal parasitoid and all others are larval parasitoids. The overall parasitism by all species is about 9%.

==== Pathogens ====
The bacteria Enterobacter aerogenes, Bacillus thuringiensis, Pseudomonas aeruginosa and Serratia marcescens are identified as causing mortality to the teak defoliator. A synnematous fungus of the genus Hirsutella is found to be pathogenic to this pest.

===== HpNPV =====
An absolutely specific virus with refractile polyhedral inclusion bodies, staining blue in Giemsa and thick blue in Buffalo Black, named as Hyblaea puera nucleopolyhedrovirus (HpNPV) is found to be very effective in the biological control of this pest. Large-scale deaths of teak defoliator larvae characterized by cessation of feeding, flaccidity, and subsequent liquefaction of body tissues have been reported by Stebbing as early as 1903. During 1985, an investigation of microbial pathogens of H. puera was undertaken in the plantations of Nilambur Forest Divisions of Kerala, India, by KFRI detected several dead insects with the characteristic symptoms as observed by Stebbing. Microscopic observation of tissues revealed the presence of refractile polyhedral inclusion bodies, which stained blue in Giemsa, measured 0.9–2.4 micrometers in diameter in the scanning electron micrograph taken by Jean Adams at USDA, confirmed its identity as NPV. The NPVs come under the family of baculoviridae and its virions are enveloped rod shaped nucleocapsids containing circular, supercoiled, double stranded DNA.

Mode of in vivo NPV infection

The NPV which enters the insect gut, lyses in the alkaline environment of the midgut, releasing virions. Virions invade the columnar cells of midgut epithelium and integrate DNA into the nucleus of midgut cells. Later the viral DNA takes over control of the cellular machinery to reproduce itself. The ECVs which are the progenies released into the haemocoel from the midgut cells are more infectious than the PIBs and mediate disease spread within the insect body. A rapid spread of infection in the insect body leads immediately to cessation of feeding and later on, to death. Even in the fully mature larvae, HpNPV can kill in 60–72 hours, making it one of the fastest acting insect viruses.

The discovery of virus disease on H. puera was a major breakthrough in the teak defoliator management research.

== Relation to humans ==
The teak moth is commonly eaten in the regions where they thrive. They are usually caught for consumption at the cocoon stage, at which point they are easily collected from the ground. This serves as an essential, readily accessible source of protein for local villagers, commonly working as farmers,. In Javanese, they are known as entung jati.
