= Scaptius holophaea =

Scientific classification
- Kingdom: Animalia
- Phylum: Arthropoda
- Clade: Pancrustacea
- Class: Insecta
- Order: Lepidoptera
- Superfamily: Noctuoidea
- Family: Erebidae
- Subfamily: Arctiinae
- Genus: Scaptius
- Species: S. holophaea

Binomial name
- Scaptius holophaea (Hampson, 1905)

Synonyms
- Neritos holophaea Hampson, 1905; Glaucostola holophaea (Hampson, 1905)

Species of moth

Scaptius holophaea is a moth in the subfamily Arctiinae. It was described by George Hampson in 1905. It is found in French Guiana, Suriname and Amazonas.
