= Max Gaede =

German engineer and entomologist

- Born: 29 November 1871; Berlin
- Died: 27 October 1946 (aged 74); Berlin
- Citizenship: German
- Scientific career
- Fields: Lepidoptera, entomology, lepidopterology
- Institutions: Berlin

Max Gaede (29 November 1871 – 27 October 1946) was a German engineer and entomologist of international fame who described several hundred of new species of Lepidoptera, mainly African Noctuidae.

He became a member of the Internationaler Entomologischer Verein in 1899. Many Lepidoptera species have been named after Max Gaede. Some of them are:

- Zekelita gaedei Lödl, 1999
- Decachorda gaedei Dufrane 1953
- Astyloneura gaedei Alberti, 1957
- Eutelia gaedei Hacker & Fibiger, 2006
- Zamarada gaedei D. S. Fletcher, 1974
- Hypocala gaedei Berio, 1955
- Ozarba gaedei Berio, 1940
- Athetis gaedei Berio, 1955
- Callyna gaedei Hacker & Fibiger, 2006

== Works ==
Some of the publications of Max Gaede are:

- 1914. Internationale entomologische Zeitschrift 8: 127, fig.
- 1915. Internationale entomologische Zeitschrift 9: 73.
- 1915. Neue afrikanische Heteroceren des Berliner Zoologischen Museums. Deutsche Entomologische Zeitschrift Iris 29: 101–122.
- 1915. Lepidoptera von Herrn P.Range im Nama-Land. Deutsche Entomologische Zeitschrift Iris 29: 144–148.
- 1916. Stettiner Entomologische Zeitung 77: p. 125, pl.
- 1916. Die äthiopischen Thyrididen nach dem Material des Berliner zoologischen Museums. Mitteilungen aus dem Zoologischen Museum in Berlin. 28 cm. 8. bd., 3. hft.:355–384.
- 1916. Neue Lepidopteren des Berliner Zoologischen Museums Vol. 3; Vol. 8 de Mitteilungen aus dem Zoologischen Museum in Berlin, Zoologisches Museum (Berlin). Editor: Friedländer, 1–17.
- 1917. Alte und neue Arten der Noktuiden-Gattung Hyblaea. Deutsche Entomologische Zeitschrift Vol.: 1916–1917: 23–29.
- 1917. Deutsche Entomologische Zeitschrift Iris 30:204.
- 1922. Striglina scitaria Wilkr. und verwandte Arten (Lepid., Thyrididen). Berliner entomologische Zeitschrift. Vol. 1922 (1): 26–35.
- 1923. Entomologische Rundschau 40: 28.
- 1925. Arctiiden-Studien (Lep.). Neue und wenig bekannte Arctiiden des Zoologischen Museums Berlin. Mitteilungen aus dem Zoologischen Museum in Berlin. 11: 233–251.
- 1925. Liphyra grandis und extensa. (Lep. Lycaen.). Berliner entomologische Zeitschrift. Vol. 1925 (2): 146.
- 1926. Amatiden des Berliner Zoologischen Museums. (Lep.). Berliner entomologische Zeitschrift. Vol. 1926 (2): 113–136.
- 1926. Einige Lithosiiden von Neu-Guinea (Lep.). Berliner entomologische Zeitschrift. Vol. 1926 (4): 335–338.
- 1926. Eine neue afrikanische Drepanide (Lep.). Berliner entomologische Zeitschrift. Vol. 1927 (2): 163–164.
- 1928. Thaumetopoeidae, Notodontidae. In: Seitz, A. (ed.) Die Gross-Schmetterlinge der Erde. Eine Systematische Bearbeitung der bis jetzt bekannten Gross-Schmetterlinge. Die Afrikanischen Spinner und Schwärmer. [Macrolepidoptera of the world. A systematic description of the hitherto known macrolepidoptera. The African spinners and swarmers]. 14:395–400, 401–444.
- 1929. Schmetterlinge oder Lepidoptera. II, Nachtfalter (Heterocera), Macrolepidoptera Jena: Gustav Fischer, 1929. 1–333.
- 1931. Satyridae 1. Lepidopterorum Catalogus. p. 43: 1–43.
- 1931. Satyridae 2. Lepidopterorum Catalogus. p. 46: 1–224.
- 1931. Satyridae 3 (pars ultima). Lepidopterorum Catalogus. p. 48: 1–225.
- 1933. Clytie luteonigra Warr. ssp. seifersi nov. (Lep. Noct.). Berliner entomologische Zeitschrift. Vol. 1933 (1): 127–128.
- 1934. Nototontidae. In: Lepidopterorum Catalogus. 59:46.
- 1935. Noctuidae. In: Seitz, A. (ed.) Die Gross-Schmetterlinge der Erde. 15.
- 1937. Eutelianae (Phlogophorinae). In Seitz, A. (ed.) Die Gross-Schmetterlinge der Erde. 11: 352–365.
- 1937. Gelechiidae. Lepidopterorum Catalogus. p. 79: 1–630.
- 1938. Oecophoridae 1. Lepidopterorum Catalogus. Junk. p. 88: 1–208.
- 1939. Oecophoridae 2. Lepidopterorum Catalogus. Junk. p. 92: 209–476.
