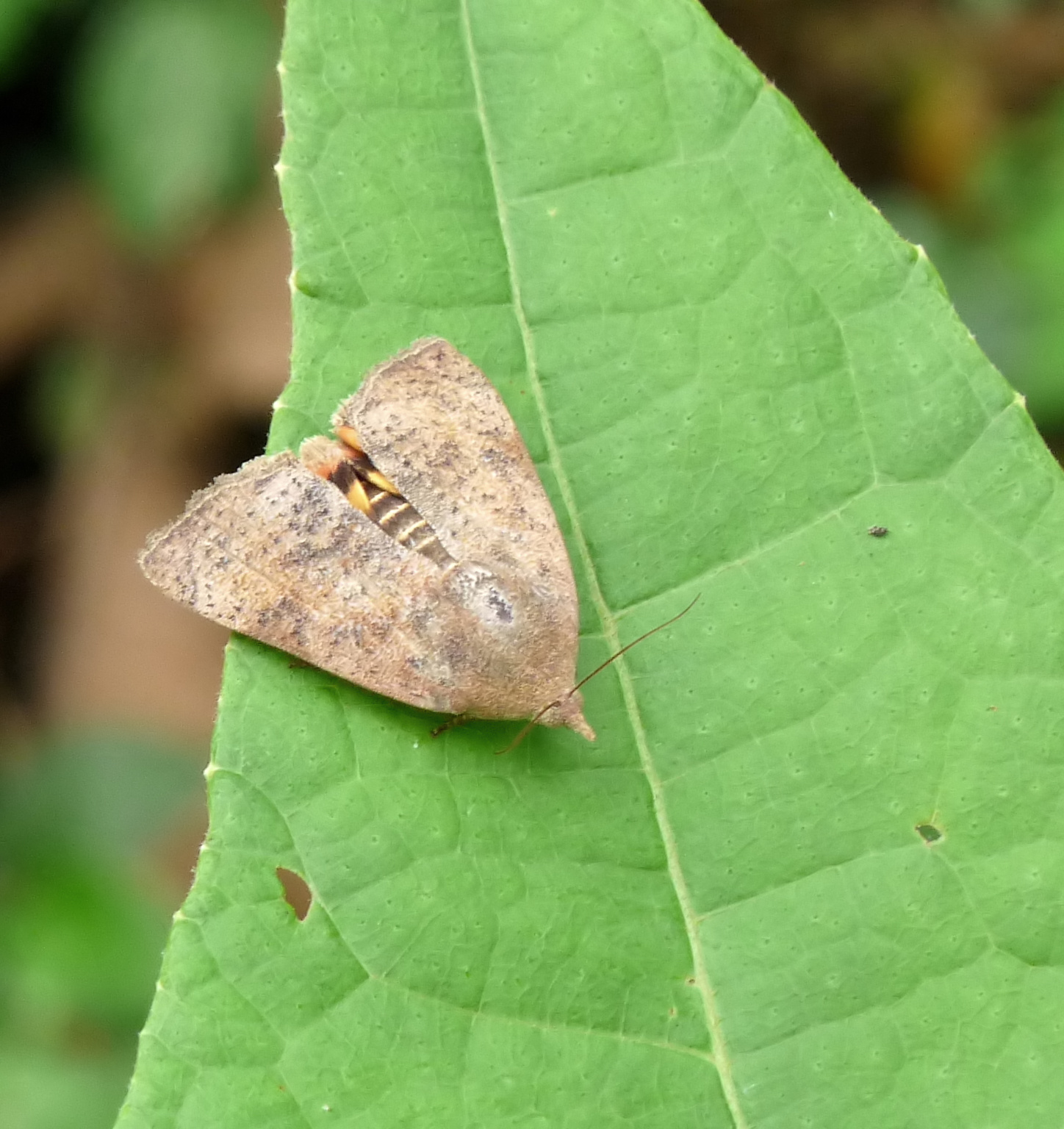
- Hyblaea puera

Scientific classification
- Kingdom: Animalia
- Phylum: Arthropoda
- Clade: Pancrustacea
- Class: Insecta
- Order: Lepidoptera
- Clade: Eulepidoptera
- Clade: Ditrysia
- Clade: Apoditrysia
- Clade: Obtectomera
- Superfamily: Hyblaeoidea
- Family: Hyblaeidae

Genera
- Erythrochrus; Hyblaea

Diversity
- About 20 species

= Hyblaeidae =

Family of moths

Hyblaeidae are the "teak moths", a family of insects in the Lepidopteran order. The two genera with about 18 species make up one of the two families of the Hyblaeoidea superfamily (the other family being the monotypic Prodidactidae), which in the past has been included in the Pyraloidea. Recent phylogenetic studies find varying relationships of Hyblaeoidea among Ditrysian Lepidoptera: Mutanen et al. (2010) find the superfamily to group either with Pyraloidea, or – more often – with Thyridoidea or butterflies. The results of Wahlberg et al. (2013) and Heikilä et al. (2015) indicate a sister-group relationship with Pyraloidea.

Males have a specialised "hair-pencil" on the hindleg.

The genus Hyblaea is distributed throughout the Old World tropics, and Torone in the Neotropics. Caterpillar host plants are well known and comprise almost exclusively species of the families Bignoniaceae, Verbenaceae, the mangrove families Avicenniaceae and Rhizophoraceae and a few other families.

== Sources ==
- Firefly Encyclopedia of Insects and Spiders, edited by Christopher O'Toole, ISBN 1-55297-612-2, 2002
