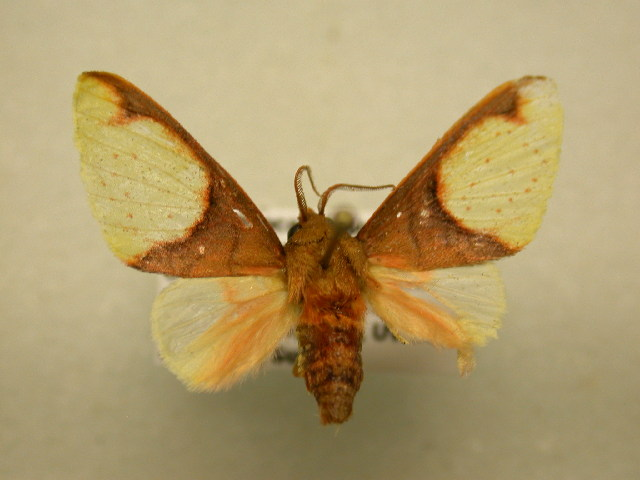
- Neonerita intorta

Scientific classification
- Kingdom: Animalia
- Phylum: Arthropoda
- Clade: Pancrustacea
- Class: Insecta
- Order: Lepidoptera
- Superfamily: Noctuoidea
- Family: Erebidae
- Subfamily: Arctiinae
- Subtribe: Phaegopterina
- Genus: Neonerita; Hampson, 1901

= Neonerita =

Genus of moths

Neonerita is a genus of moths in the family Erebidae. The genus was erected by George Hampson in 1901.

== Species ==
- Neonerita dorsipuncta Hampson, 1901
- Neonerita fenestrata (Rothschild, 1910)
- Neonerita hyalinata (Reich, 1933)
- Neonerita parapressa Dognin, 1911
- Neonerita pulchra Toulgoët, 1983

== Former species ==
- Pseudepimolis haemasticta Dognin, 1906
- Pseudepimolis incisa Schaus, 1910
- Trichromia metaphoenica Joicey & Talbot, 1917
- Trichromia postsuffusa Rothschild, 1922
- Trichromia yahuasae Joicey & Talbot, 1916
