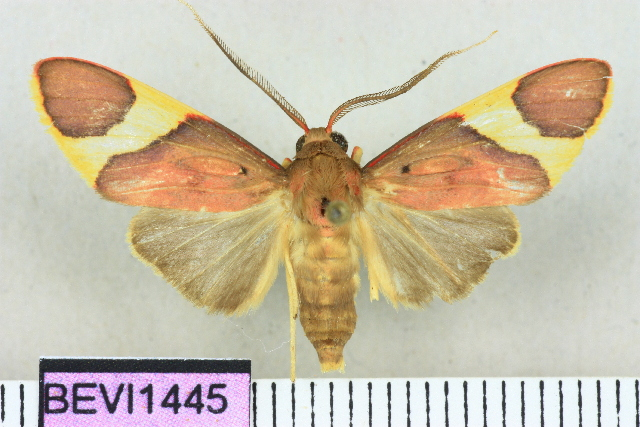
- Trichromia onytes

Scientific classification
- Kingdom: Animalia
- Phylum: Arthropoda
- Clade: Pancrustacea
- Class: Insecta
- Order: Lepidoptera
- Superfamily: Noctuoidea
- Family: Erebidae
- Subfamily: Arctiinae
- Tribe: Arctiini
- Subtribe: Phaegopterina
- Genus: Trichromia; Hübner, [1819]

Synonyms
- Neritos Walker, 1855; Antiloba Weymer, 1895; Parevia Hampson, 1901; Paranerita Hampson, 1901

= Trichromia =

Genus of moths

Trichromia is a genus of moths in the family Erebidae erected by Jacob Hübner in 1819. The members of this genus are largely indigenous to South America.

== Species ==
The following species are recognised in the genus Trichromia:

- Trichromia albicollis (Hampson, 1905)
- Trichromia amelia (Schaus, 1911)
- Trichromia androconiata (Rothschild, 1909)
- Trichromia atta (Schaus, 1920)
- Trichromia aurantiipennis (Rothschild, 1909)
- Trichromia basirubra Reich, 1935
- Trichromia bione E. D. Jones, 1914
- Trichromia brueckneri (Gaede, 1928)
- Trichromia cardinalis (Dognin, 1899)
- Trichromia carinaria (Schaus, 1905)
- Trichromia carminata Schaus, 1905
- Trichromia cinerea (Rothschild, 1913)
- Trichromia clarivena (Gaede, 1923)
- Trichromia coccinea (Schaus, 1905)
- Trichromia coccineothorax Rothschild, 1922
- Trichromia columbiana Gaede, 1928
- Trichromia complicata (Schaus, 1905)
- Trichromia cotes (Druce, 1896)
- Trichromia cucufas (Schaus, 1924)
- Trichromia cuneoplagiatus Rothschild, 1922
- Trichromia curta (Rothschild, 1917)
- Trichromia cybar (Schaus, 1924)
- Trichromia cyclopera (Hampson, 1905)
- Trichromia declivis (Schaus, 1905)
- Trichromia discobola (Hampson, 1905)
- Trichromia discophora (Hampson, 1916)
- Trichromia diversa Rothschild, 1917
- Trichromia drucei (Rothschild, 1909)
- Trichromia eximius (Rothschild, 1910)
- Trichromia flavibrunnea (Dognin, 1911)
- Trichromia flavimargo (Joicey & Talbot, 1916)
- Trichromia flavomarginata (Rothschild, 1910)
- Trichromia flavoroseus (Walker, 1855)
- Trichromia flexuosa Schaus, 1911
- Trichromia furva (Schaus, 1905)
- Trichromia gaudialis (Schaus, 1905)
- Trichromia granatina (Rothschild, 1909)
- Trichromia grandis (Rothschild, 1909)
- Trichromia griseata (Rothschild, 1909)
- Trichromia guianensis (Joicey & Talbot, 1916)
- Trichromia gurma (Schaus, 1920)
- Trichromia hamoia (Joicey & Talbot, 1916)
- Trichromia impunctata (Gaede, 1928)
- Trichromia incerta (Schaus, 1905)
- Trichromia inequalis (Rothschild, 1909)
- Trichromia insperata Laguerre, 2011
- Trichromia interna (Schaus, 1905)
- Trichromia irma Schaus, 1920
- Trichromia irregularis Rothschild, 1909
- Trichromia ishima (Schaus, 1933)
- Trichromia kennedyi Rothschild, 1917
- Trichromia kotolnuki (Grados, 2018)
- Trichromia leucoplaga (Hampson, 1905)
- Trichromia lophosticta (Schaus, 1911)
- Trichromia lucens (Schaus, 1905)
- Trichromia macrostidza (Hampson, 1905)
- Trichromia maculata (Rothschild, 1909)
- Trichromia marmorata (Toulgoët, 1983)
- Trichromia mathani (Rothschild, 1909)
- Trichromia metachryseis (Hampson, 1905)
- Trichromia metaleuca (Dognin, 1911)
- Trichromia metaphoenica (Joicey & Talbot, 1917)
- Trichromia metapyria (Dognin, 1907)
- Trichromia metapyrioides Rothschild, 1916
- Trichromia metaxantha Dognin, 1914
- Trichromia methaemia (Schaus, 1905)
- Trichromia neretina Dyar, 1898
- Trichromia niobe Schaus, 1911
- Trichromia ockendeni (Rothschild, 1909)
- Trichromia odorata (Rothschild, 1909)
- Trichromia onytes (Cramer, [1777])
- Trichromia orbifer Hampson, 1916
- Trichromia oroyana Rothschild, 1922
- Trichromia pandera Schaus, 1896
- Trichromia parallela (Gaede, 1928)
- Trichromia parnelli (Schaus, 1911)
- Trichromia patara (Druce, 1896)
- Trichromia pectinata (Rothschild, 1935)
- Trichromia peninsulata Dognin, 1914
- Trichromia persimilis (Rothschild, 1909)
- Trichromia peruviana Rothschild, 1909
- Trichromia perversa (Rothschild, 1909)
- Trichromia phaeocrota (Dognin, 1911)
- Trichromia phaeoplaga (Hampson, 1905)
- Trichromia pinon (Druce, 1911)
- Trichromia polyxena (Druce, 1883)
- Trichromia polyxenoides Rothschild, 1909
- Trichromia postflavida (Toulgoët, 1982)
- Trichromia postsuffusa Rothschild, 1922
- Trichromia psamas (Cramer, [1779])
- Trichromia purpurascens (Rothschild, 1909)
- Trichromia purpureotincta (Joicey & Talbot, 1918)
- Trichromia quadricolor Toulgoët, 1982
- Trichromia repanda (Walker, 1855)
- Trichromia rhodocraspis (Hampson, 1909)
- Trichromia rosacea (Rothschild, 1909)
- Trichromia rosaceata (Watson & Goodger, 1986)
- Trichromia roseata (Gaede, 1928)
- Trichromia rubidata Gaede, 1928
- Trichromia rubrosignata (Rothschild, 1917)
- Trichromia samos (Druce, 1896)
- Trichromia sanguipuncta (Schaus, 1901)
- Trichromia sardanapalus (Rothschild, 1909)
- Trichromia sinefascia Vincent & Laguerre, 2017
- Trichromia sisenna (Druce, 1899)
- Trichromia sithnides (Druce, 1896)
- Trichromia sorex (Druce, 1902)
- Trichromia supracoccinea Vincent & Laguerre, 2017
- Trichromia tipolis (Druce, 1896)
- Trichromia translucida Rothschild, 1917
- Trichromia tremula (Schaus, 1905)
- Trichromia triangularis (Rothschild, 1909)
- Trichromia trilobata (Gaede, 1923)
- Trichromia unicolorata (Gaede, 1928)
- Trichromia vicinula Toulgoët, 1995
- Trichromia viola (Dognin, 1909)
- Trichromia vulmaria (Schaus, 1924)
- Trichromia yahuasae Joicey & Talbot, 1916

== Former species ==
- Trichromia apiciplaga (Rothschild, 1909)
- Trichromia chrysozona (Schaus, 1905)
- Trichromia flavipurpurea (Dognin, 1914)
- Trichromia hampsoni (Rothschild, 1909)
- Trichromia nigricollum (Dognin, 1892)
- Trichromia syntomoides (Rothschild, 1910)

== References and notes ==
- Pitkin, Brian & Jenkins, Paul. "Search results Family: Arctiidae". Butterflies and Moths of the World. Natural History Museum, London.
- Laguerre 2011: [Contribution to the knowledge of Neotropical Arctiidae VII. Description of a new species of Trichromia Huebner from French Guyana with a curious case of mimicry (Lepidoptera Arctiidae Arctiinae).] Entomologiste, '67'(1): 33–38. [not seen]
- Toulgoët, H. de, 1982: Résultats d'un voyage entomologique privé en Guyane Française, 1980, et description de nouvelles espèces d'Arcttides néotropicales (Lepidoptera: Arctiidae). Nouvelle Revue d'Entomologie 12 (2): 165–173.
- Toulgoët, H. de, 1991: Le genre Trichromia Hübner 1816, caractéristiques, composition et limites (Lepidoptera: Arctiidae: Arctiinae) . Lambillionea 91 (2): 127–136.
