= Trichromia klagesi =

Scientific classification
- Domain: Eukaryota
- Kingdom: Animalia
- Phylum: Arthropoda
- Class: Insecta
- Order: Lepidoptera
- Superfamily: Noctuoidea
- Family: Erebidae
- Subfamily: Arctiinae
- Genus: Trichromia
- Species: T. klagesi

Binomial name
- Trichromia klagesi (Rothschild, 1909)

Synonyms
- Paranerita klagesi Rothschild, 1909; Paranerita klagesi salmonea Rothschild, 1935

Species of moth

Trichromia klagesi is a moth in the subfamily Arctiinae. It was described by Rothschild in 1909. It is found in French Guiana, Guyana and Brazil.

== Subspecies ==
- Trichromia klagesi klagesi
- Trichromia klagesi salmonea (Rothschild, 1935) (Guyana)
