= Trichromia coccineata =

Scientific classification
- Domain: Eukaryota
- Kingdom: Animalia
- Phylum: Arthropoda
- Class: Insecta
- Order: Lepidoptera
- Superfamily: Noctuoidea
- Family: Erebidae
- Subfamily: Arctiinae
- Genus: Trichromia
- Species: T. coccineata

Binomial name
- Trichromia coccineata (Rothschild, 1935)

Synonyms
- Neritos coccineata Rothschild, 1935; Neritos ockendeni coccinea Rothschild, 1922; Neritos parvimacula Rothschild, 1922

Species of moth

Trichromia coccineata is a moth in the subfamily Arctiinae. It was described by Rothschild in 1935. It is found in French Guiana, Suriname and Amazonas.

== Subspecies ==
- Trichromia coccineata coccineata
- Trichromia coccineata parvimacula (Rothschild, 1922) (French Guiana)
