= Trichromia leucostigma =

Scientific classification
- Domain: Eukaryota
- Kingdom: Animalia
- Phylum: Arthropoda
- Class: Insecta
- Order: Lepidoptera
- Superfamily: Noctuoidea
- Family: Erebidae
- Subfamily: Arctiinae
- Genus: Trichromia
- Species: T. leucostigma

Binomial name
- Trichromia leucostigma (Sepp, [1855])

Synonyms
- Phalaena leucostigma Sepp, [1855]

Species of moth

Trichromia leucostigma is a moth in the subfamily Arctiinae. It was described by Sepp in 1855. It is found in Suriname.
