= Trichromia purpureotincta =

Scientific classification
- Domain: Eukaryota
- Kingdom: Animalia
- Phylum: Arthropoda
- Class: Insecta
- Order: Lepidoptera
- Superfamily: Noctuoidea
- Family: Erebidae
- Subfamily: Arctiinae
- Genus: Trichromia
- Species: T. purpureotincta

Binomial name
- Trichromia purpureotincta (Joicey & Talbot, 1918)

Synonyms
- Neritos purpureotincta Joicey & Talbot, 1918

Species of moth

Trichromia purpureotincta is a moth in the family Erebidae. It was described by James John Joicey and George Talbot in 1918. It is found in French Guiana, Venezuela, Peru and Bolivia.
