= Haemanota concelata =

Scientific classification
- Kingdom: Animalia
- Phylum: Arthropoda
- Clade: Pancrustacea
- Class: Insecta
- Order: Lepidoptera
- Superfamily: Noctuoidea
- Family: Erebidae
- Subfamily: Arctiinae
- Genus: Haemanota
- Species: H. concelata

Binomial name
- Haemanota concelata Laguerre, 2005

Species of moth

Haemanota concelata is a moth of the family Erebidae. It is found in French Guiana.
