= Trichromia carminata =

Scientific classification
- Kingdom: Animalia
- Phylum: Arthropoda
- Clade: Pancrustacea
- Class: Insecta
- Order: Lepidoptera
- Superfamily: Noctuoidea
- Family: Erebidae
- Subfamily: Arctiinae
- Genus: Trichromia
- Species: T. carminata

Binomial name
- Trichromia carminata (Schaus, 1905)

Synonyms
- Paranerita carminata Schaus, 1905

Species of moth

Trichromia carminata is a species of moth in the subfamily Arctiinae. It was first described by William Schaus in 1905. It is found in French Guiana.
