= Trichromia atta =

Scientific classification
- Domain: Eukaryota
- Kingdom: Animalia
- Phylum: Arthropoda
- Class: Insecta
- Order: Lepidoptera
- Superfamily: Noctuoidea
- Family: Erebidae
- Subfamily: Arctiinae
- Genus: Trichromia
- Species: T. atta

Binomial name
- Trichromia atta (Schaus, 1920)

Synonyms
- Neritos atta Schaus, 1920

Species of moth

Trichromia atta is a moth in the family Erebidae. It was described by William Schaus in 1920. It is found in Guatemala and Honduras.
