= Trichromia gurma =

Scientific classification
- Kingdom: Animalia
- Phylum: Arthropoda
- Clade: Pancrustacea
- Class: Insecta
- Order: Lepidoptera
- Superfamily: Noctuoidea
- Family: Erebidae
- Subfamily: Arctiinae
- Genus: Trichromia
- Species: T. gurma

Binomial name
- Trichromia gurma (Schaus, 1920)

Synonyms
- Parevia gurma Schaus, 1920

Species of moth

Trichromia gurma is a species of moth in the subfamily Arctiinae that was first described by William Schaus in 1920. It is found in Guatemala.
