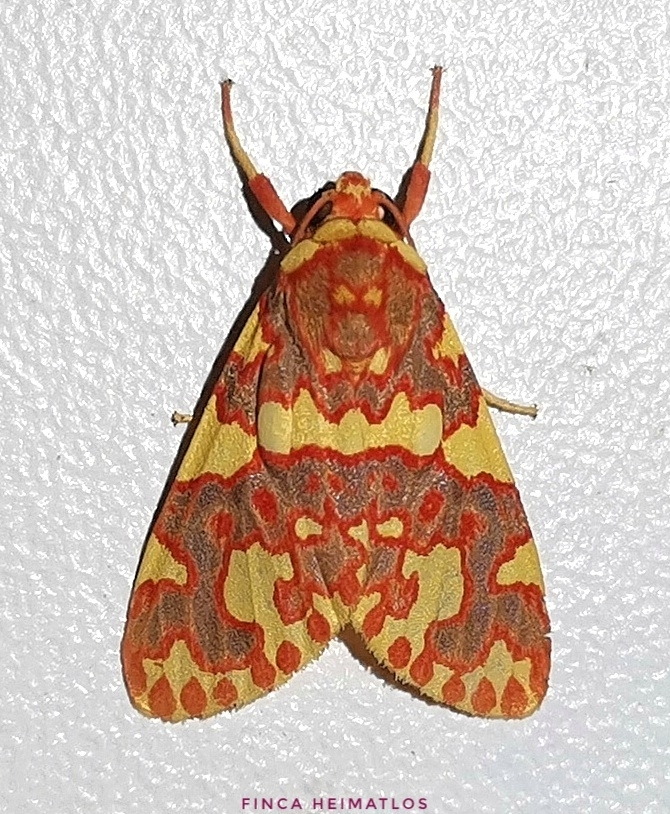

Scientific classification
- Kingdom: Animalia
- Phylum: Arthropoda
- Clade: Pancrustacea
- Class: Insecta
- Order: Lepidoptera
- Superfamily: Noctuoidea
- Family: Erebidae
- Subfamily: Arctiinae
- Genus: Trichromia
- Species: T. persimilis

Binomial name
- Trichromia persimilis (Rothschild, 1909)

Synonyms
- Hyponerita persimilis Rothschild, 1909; Neritos persimilis Rothschild, 1909; Paranerita persimilis Hampson, 1920

= Trichromia persimilis =

Species of moth

Trichromia persimilis is a species of moth in the family Erebidae that was first described by Walter Rothschild in 1909. It is found in French Guiana, Brazil, Peru and Suriname.
