= Neonerita fenestrata =

Scientific classification
- Domain: Eukaryota
- Kingdom: Animalia
- Phylum: Arthropoda
- Class: Insecta
- Order: Lepidoptera
- Superfamily: Noctuoidea
- Family: Erebidae
- Subfamily: Arctiinae
- Genus: Neonerita
- Species: N. fenestrata

Binomial name
- Neonerita fenestrata (Rothschild, 1910)

Synonyms
- Automolis fenestrata Rothschild, 1910

Species of moth

Neonerita fenestrata is a moth of the family Erebidae. First described by Walter Rothschild in 1910, it is found in Brazil and French Guiana.

== Subspecies ==
- Neonerita fenestrata fenestrata Brazil (Amazonas)
- Neonerita fenestrata lecourti Toulgoët, 1983 (French Guiana)
