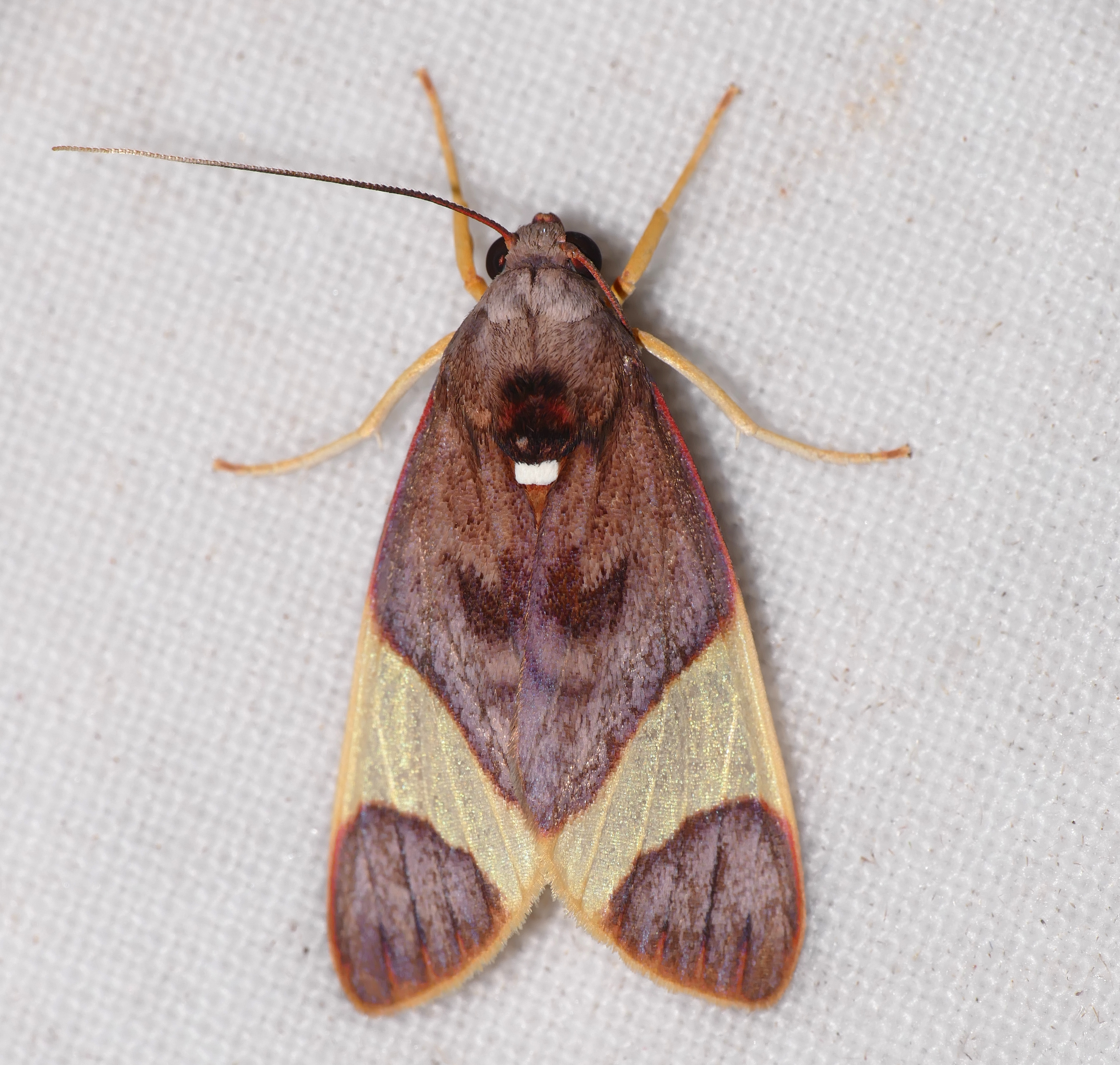

Scientific classification
- Domain: Eukaryota
- Kingdom: Animalia
- Phylum: Arthropoda
- Class: Insecta
- Order: Lepidoptera
- Superfamily: Noctuoidea
- Family: Erebidae
- Subfamily: Arctiinae
- Genus: Trichromia
- Species: T. viola

Binomial name
- Trichromia viola (Dognin, 1909)

Synonyms
- Hyponerita viola Dognin, 1909

= Trichromia viola =

Species of moth

Trichromia viola is a moth in the family Erebidae. It was described by Paul Dognin in 1909. It is found in French Guiana and Venezuela.
