= Trichromia cotes =

Scientific classification
- Domain: Eukaryota
- Kingdom: Animalia
- Phylum: Arthropoda
- Class: Insecta
- Order: Lepidoptera
- Superfamily: Noctuoidea
- Family: Erebidae
- Subfamily: Arctiinae
- Genus: Trichromia
- Species: T. cotes

Binomial name
- Trichromia cotes (H. Druce, 1896)

Synonyms
- Neritos cotes H. Druce, 1896

Species of moth

Trichromia cotes is a moth in the family Erebidae. It was described by Herbert Druce in 1896. It is found in Costa Rica and Guatemala.
