= Trichromia pandera =

Scientific classification
- Domain: Eukaryota
- Kingdom: Animalia
- Phylum: Arthropoda
- Class: Insecta
- Order: Lepidoptera
- Superfamily: Noctuoidea
- Family: Erebidae
- Subfamily: Arctiinae
- Genus: Trichromia
- Species: T. pandera

Binomial name
- Trichromia pandera Schaus, 1896

Synonyms
- Paranerita ampla Dognin, 1911

Species of moth

Trichromia pandera is a moth in the family Erebidae. It was described by William Schaus in 1896. It is found in French Guiana, Venezuela and Brazil.
