= Trichromia maculata =

Scientific classification
- Domain: Eukaryota
- Kingdom: Animalia
- Phylum: Arthropoda
- Class: Insecta
- Order: Lepidoptera
- Superfamily: Noctuoidea
- Family: Erebidae
- Subfamily: Arctiinae
- Genus: Trichromia
- Species: T. maculata

Binomial name
- Trichromia maculata (Rothschild, 1909)

Synonyms
- Parevia maculata Rothschild, 1909; Paranerita maculata

Species of moth

Trichromia maculata is a moth of the family Erebidae. It was described by Walter Rothschild in 1909. It is found in French Guiana and Brazil.
