= Trichromia neretina =

Scientific classification
- Kingdom: Animalia
- Phylum: Arthropoda
- Class: Insecta
- Order: Lepidoptera
- Superfamily: Noctuoidea
- Family: Erebidae
- Subfamily: Arctiinae
- Genus: Trichromia
- Species: T. neretina

Binomial name
- Trichromia neretina Dyar, 1898

Species of moth

Trichromia neretina is a moth in the family Erebidae. It was described by Harrison Gray Dyar Jr. in 1898. It is found in Venezuela and Peru.
