= Trichromia basirubra =

Scientific classification
- Kingdom: Animalia
- Phylum: Arthropoda
- Clade: Pancrustacea
- Class: Insecta
- Order: Lepidoptera
- Superfamily: Noctuoidea
- Family: Erebidae
- Subfamily: Arctiinae
- Genus: Trichromia
- Species: T. basirubra

Binomial name
- Trichromia basirubra (Reich, 1935)

Synonyms
- Paranerita basirubra Reich, 1935

Species of moth

Trichromia basirubra is a species of moth in the subfamily Arctiinae. It was first described by Reich in 1935. It is found in Brazil.
