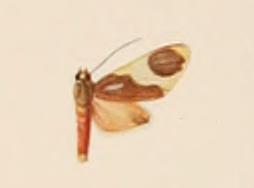

Scientific classification
- Domain: Eukaryota
- Kingdom: Animalia
- Phylum: Arthropoda
- Class: Insecta
- Order: Lepidoptera
- Superfamily: Noctuoidea
- Family: Erebidae
- Subfamily: Arctiinae
- Genus: Trichromia
- Species: T. androconiata

Binomial name
- Trichromia androconiata (Rothschild, 1909)

Synonyms
- Neritos androconiata Rothschild, 1909

= Trichromia androconiata =

Species of moth

Trichromia androconiata is a moth of the family Erebidae first described by Walter Rothschild in 1909. It is found in French Guiana, Amazonas, Peru and Costa Rica.
