= Hyponerita rosaceata =

Scientific classification
- Domain: Eukaryota
- Kingdom: Animalia
- Phylum: Arthropoda
- Class: Insecta
- Order: Lepidoptera
- Superfamily: Noctuoidea
- Family: Erebidae
- Subfamily: Arctiinae
- Genus: Hyponerita
- Species: H. rosaceata

Binomial name
- Hyponerita rosaceata Watson & Goodger, 1986

Synonyms
- Paranerita rosacea Rothschild, 1935 (preocc. Rothschild, 1909)

Species of moth

Hyponerita rosaceata is a moth of the subfamily Arctiinae. It was described by Watson and Goodger in 1986. It is found in Brazil.
