= Trichromia sardanapalus =

Scientific classification
- Domain: Eukaryota
- Kingdom: Animalia
- Phylum: Arthropoda
- Class: Insecta
- Order: Lepidoptera
- Superfamily: Noctuoidea
- Family: Erebidae
- Subfamily: Arctiinae
- Genus: Trichromia
- Species: T. sardanapalus

Binomial name
- Trichromia sardanapalus (Rothschild, 1909)

Synonyms
- Hyponerita sardanapalus Rothschild, 1909

Species of moth

Trichromia sardanapalus is a moth in the family Erebidae. It was described by Walter Rothschild in 1909. It is found in Peru and Brazil.
