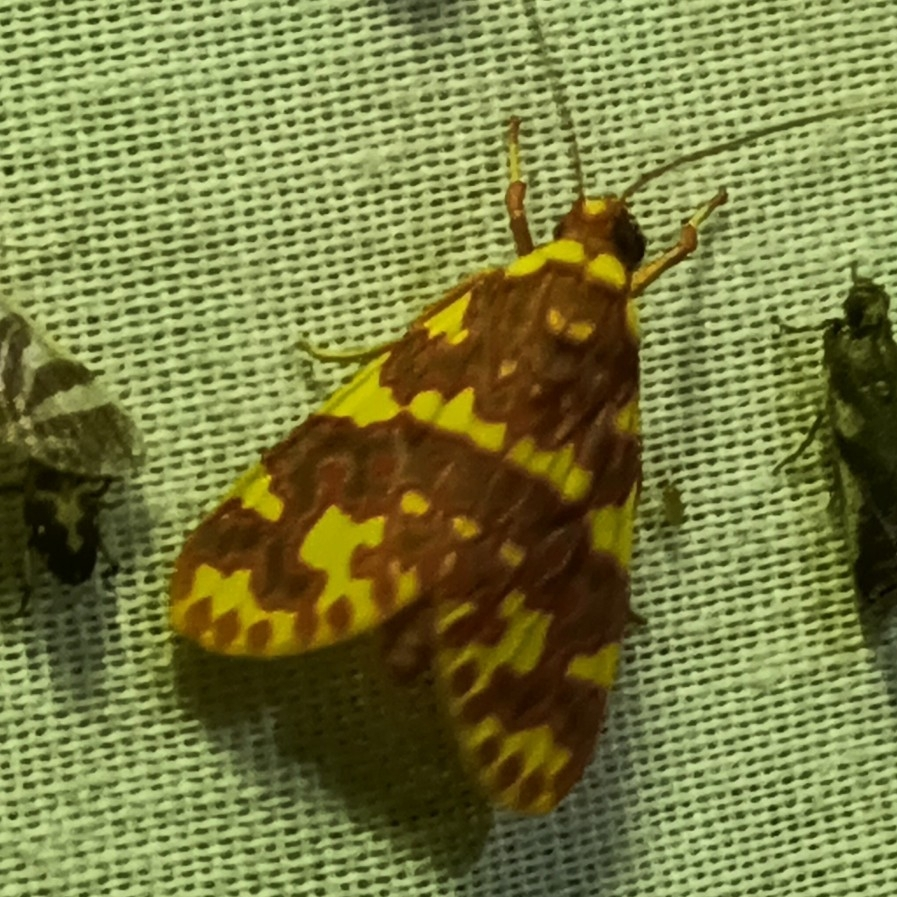

Scientific classification
- Kingdom: Animalia
- Phylum: Arthropoda
- Class: Insecta
- Order: Lepidoptera
- Superfamily: Noctuoidea
- Family: Erebidae
- Subfamily: Arctiinae
- Genus: Hyponerita
- Species: H. lavinia

Binomial name
- Hyponerita lavinia (H. Druce, 1890)

Synonyms
- Idalus lavinia H. Druce, 1890

= Hyponerita lavinia =

Species of moth

Hyponerita lavinia is a moth of the subfamily Arctiinae first described by Herbert Druce in 1890. It is found in French Guiana, Guyana and Bolivia.
