= Trichromia cardinalis =

Scientific classification
- Domain: Eukaryota
- Kingdom: Animalia
- Phylum: Arthropoda
- Class: Insecta
- Order: Lepidoptera
- Superfamily: Noctuoidea
- Family: Erebidae
- Subfamily: Arctiinae
- Genus: Trichromia
- Species: T. cardinalis

Binomial name
- Trichromia cardinalis (Dognin, 1899)

Synonyms
- Neritos cardinalis Dognin, 1899

Species of moth

Trichromia cardinalis is a moth in the family Erebidae. It was described by Paul Dognin in 1899. It is found in French Guiana, Colombia, Ecuador and Bolivia.
