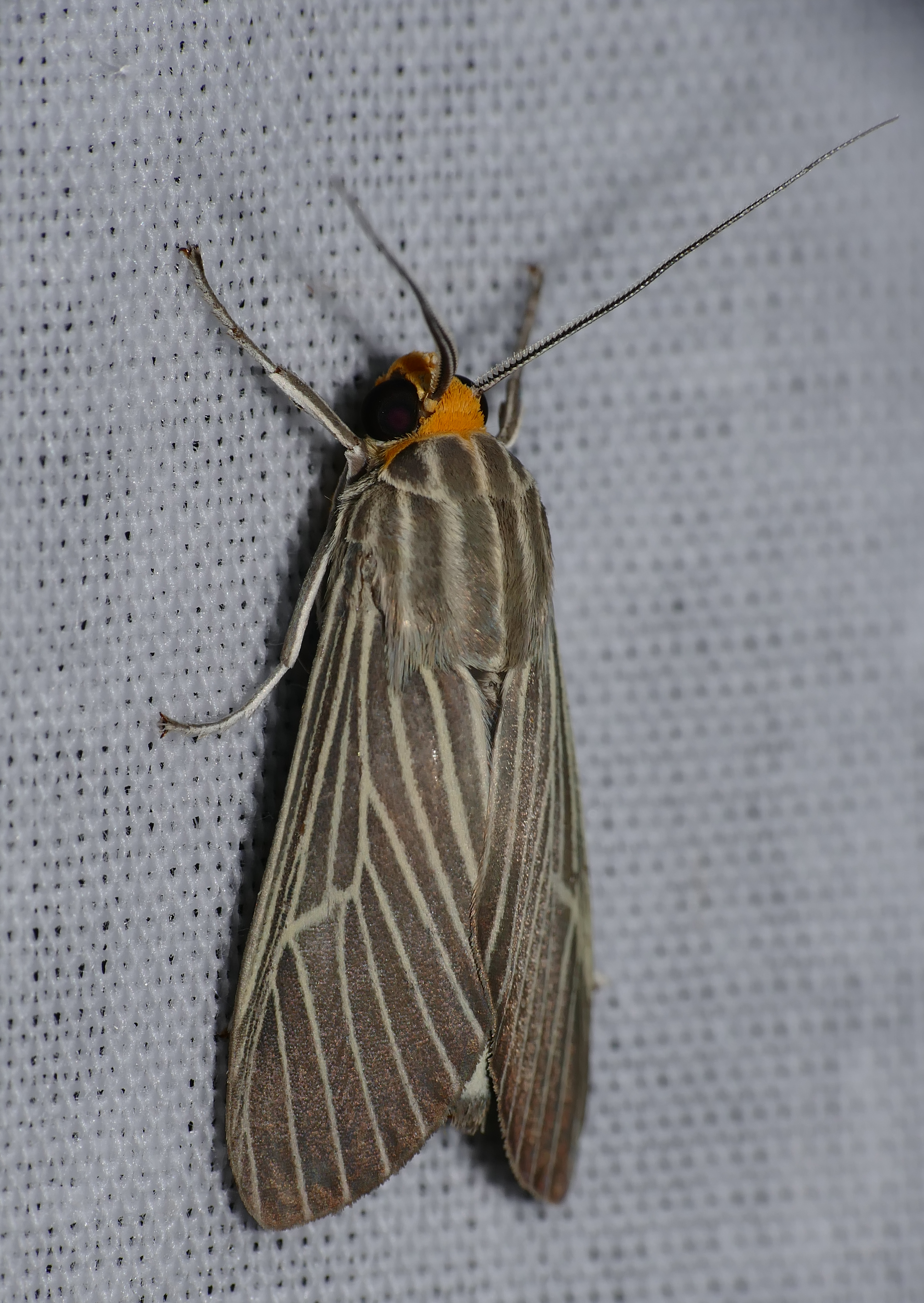

Scientific classification
- Kingdom: Animalia
- Phylum: Arthropoda
- Class: Insecta
- Order: Lepidoptera
- Superfamily: Noctuoidea
- Family: Erebidae
- Subfamily: Arctiinae
- Genus: Haemanota
- Species: H. fereunicolor

Binomial name
- Haemanota fereunicolor (Toulgoët, 1987)

Synonyms
- Neritos fereunicolor Toulgoët, 1987

= Haemanota fereunicolor =

Species of moth

Haemanota fereunicolor is a moth of the family Erebidae. It was described by Hervé de Toulgoët in 1987. It is found in French Guiana.
