= Hyponerita ishima =

Scientific classification
- Domain: Eukaryota
- Kingdom: Animalia
- Phylum: Arthropoda
- Class: Insecta
- Order: Lepidoptera
- Superfamily: Noctuoidea
- Family: Erebidae
- Subfamily: Arctiinae
- Genus: Hyponerita
- Species: H. ishima

Binomial name
- Hyponerita ishima Schaus, 1933

Species of moth

Hyponerita ishima is a moth of the subfamily Arctiinae. It was described by William Schaus in 1933. It is found in Brazil.
