= Trichromia ockendeni =

Scientific classification
- Domain: Eukaryota
- Kingdom: Animalia
- Phylum: Arthropoda
- Class: Insecta
- Order: Lepidoptera
- Superfamily: Noctuoidea
- Family: Erebidae
- Subfamily: Arctiinae
- Genus: Trichromia
- Species: T. ockendeni

Binomial name
- Trichromia ockendeni (Rothschild, 1909)

Synonyms
- Hyponerita ockendeni Rothschild, 1909; Hyponerita posterior Rothschild, 1909

Species of moth

Trichromia ockendeni is a moth in the family Erebidae. It was described by Walter Rothschild in 1909. It is found in French Guiana and Peru.
