= Hyponerita incerta =

Scientific classification
- Domain: Eukaryota
- Kingdom: Animalia
- Phylum: Arthropoda
- Class: Insecta
- Order: Lepidoptera
- Superfamily: Noctuoidea
- Family: Erebidae
- Subfamily: Arctiinae
- Genus: Hyponerita
- Species: H. incerta

Binomial name
- Hyponerita incerta Schaus, 1905

Species of moth

Hyponerita incerta is a moth of the family Erebidae. It was described by William Schaus in 1905. It is found in French Guiana.
