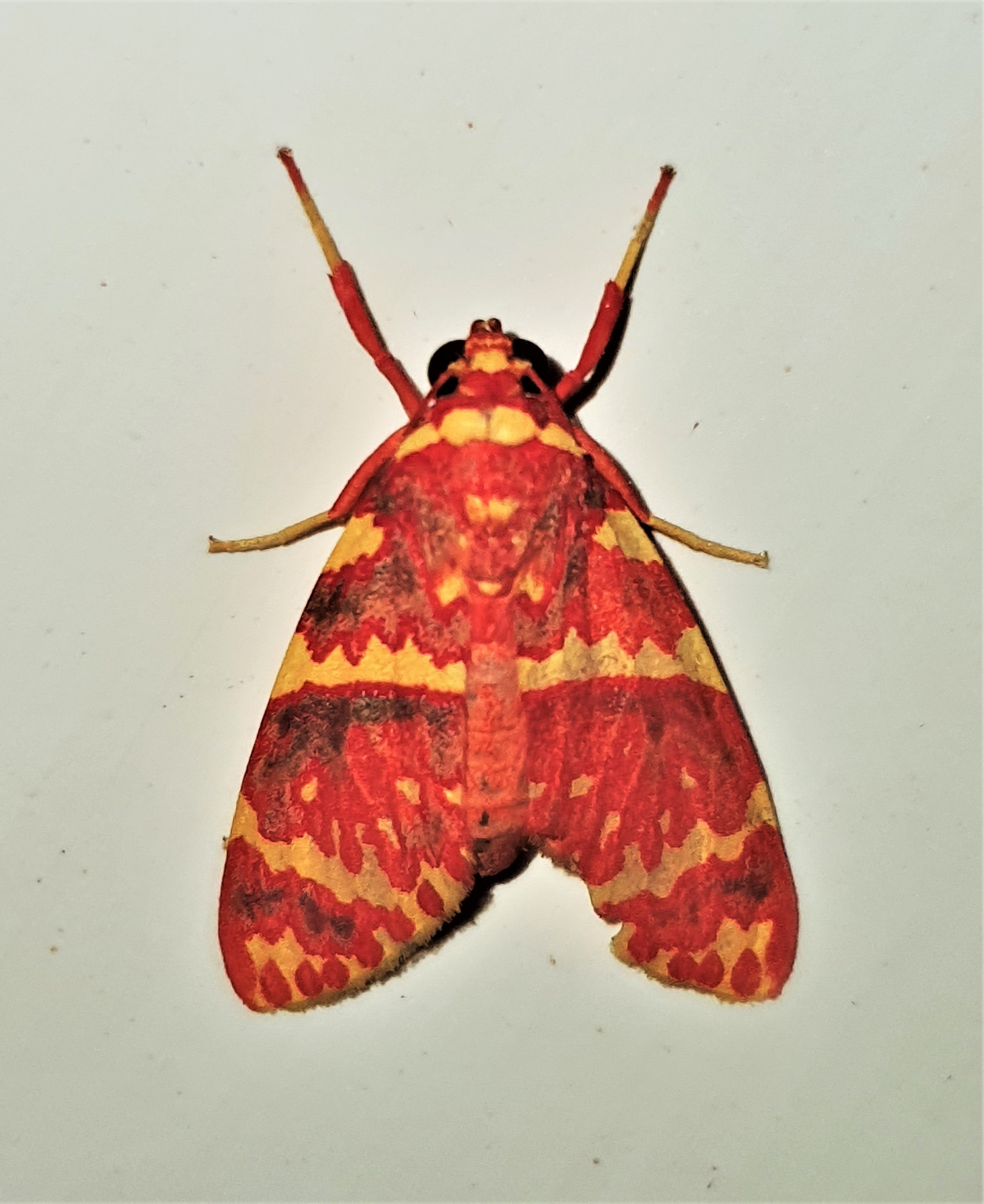

Scientific classification
- Kingdom: Animalia
- Phylum: Arthropoda
- Class: Insecta
- Order: Lepidoptera
- Superfamily: Noctuoidea
- Family: Erebidae
- Subfamily: Arctiinae
- Genus: Hyponerita
- Species: H. similis

Binomial name
- Hyponerita similis Rothschild, 1909

= Hyponerita similis =

Species of moth

Hyponerita similis is a moth of the subfamily Arctiinae first described by Walter Rothschild in 1909. It is found in French Guiana, Suriname, Guyana, Amazonas, Venezuela, Ecuador and Peru.
