= Trichromia metaleuca =

Scientific classification
- Kingdom: Animalia
- Phylum: Arthropoda
- Clade: Pancrustacea
- Class: Insecta
- Order: Lepidoptera
- Superfamily: Noctuoidea
- Family: Erebidae
- Subfamily: Arctiinae
- Genus: Trichromia
- Species: T. metaleuca

Binomial name
- Trichromia metaleuca (Dognin, 1911)

Synonyms
- Neritos metaleuca Dognin, 1911

Species of moth

Trichromia metaleuca is a moth in the family Erebidae. It was described by Paul Dognin in 1911. It is found in Venezuela.
