= Trichromia guianensis =

Scientific classification
- Kingdom: Animalia
- Phylum: Arthropoda
- Clade: Pancrustacea
- Class: Insecta
- Order: Lepidoptera
- Superfamily: Noctuoidea
- Family: Erebidae
- Subfamily: Arctiinae
- Genus: Trichromia
- Species: T. guianensis

Binomial name
- Trichromia guianensis (Joicey & Talbot, 1916)

Synonyms
- Parevia guianensis Joicey & Talbot, 1916

Species of moth

Trichromia guianensis is a species of moth in the subfamily Arctiinae first described by James John Joicey and George Talbot in 1916. It is found in French Guiana.
