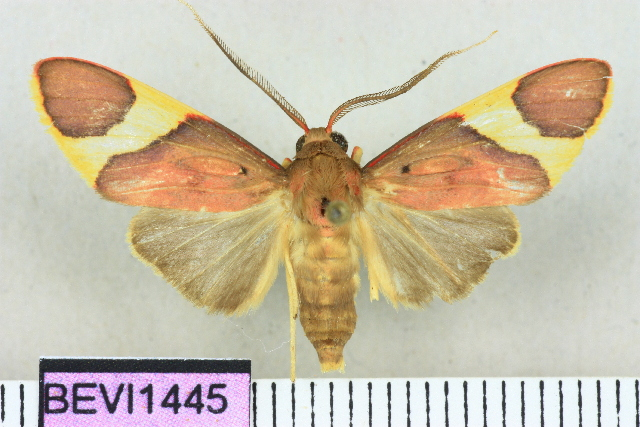

Scientific classification
- Domain: Eukaryota
- Kingdom: Animalia
- Phylum: Arthropoda
- Class: Insecta
- Order: Lepidoptera
- Superfamily: Noctuoidea
- Family: Erebidae
- Subfamily: Arctiinae
- Genus: Trichromia
- Species: T. onytes

Binomial name
- Trichromia onytes (Cramer, [1777])

Synonyms
- Phalaena onytes Cramer, [1777]; Noctua onytes Cramer, [1777]; Sphinx psamas Cramer, [1779]

= Trichromia onytes =

Species of moth

Trichromia onytes is a species of moth from the family Erebidae first described by Pieter Cramer in 1777. It is found in Suriname, Brazil, Bolivia, Peru and Panama.
