= Trichromia rubidata =

Scientific classification
- Kingdom: Animalia
- Phylum: Arthropoda
- Clade: Pancrustacea
- Class: Insecta
- Order: Lepidoptera
- Superfamily: Noctuoidea
- Family: Erebidae
- Subfamily: Arctiinae
- Genus: Trichromia
- Species: T. rubidata

Binomial name
- Trichromia rubidata (Gaede, 1928)

Synonyms
- Paranerita rubidata Gaede, 1928

Species of moth

Trichromia rubidata is a species of moth in the subfamily Arctiinae. It was first described by Max Gaede in 1928. It is found in Colombia.
