= Pseudepimolis marpessa =

Scientific classification
- Domain: Eukaryota
- Kingdom: Animalia
- Phylum: Arthropoda
- Class: Insecta
- Order: Lepidoptera
- Superfamily: Noctuoidea
- Family: Erebidae
- Subfamily: Arctiinae
- Genus: Pseudepimolis
- Species: P. marpessa

Binomial name
- Pseudepimolis marpessa (H. Druce, 1906)

Synonyms
- Epimolis marpessa (H. Druce, 1906); Idalus marpessa H. Druce, 1906

Species of moth

Pseudepimolis marpessa is a moth of the family Erebidae. It was described by Herbert Druce in 1906. It is found in Peru.
