= Trichromia flavibrunnea =

Scientific classification
- Kingdom: Animalia
- Phylum: Arthropoda
- Class: Insecta
- Order: Lepidoptera
- Superfamily: Noctuoidea
- Family: Erebidae
- Subfamily: Arctiinae
- Genus: Trichromia
- Species: T. flavibrunnea

Binomial name
- Trichromia flavibrunnea (Dognin, 1911)

Synonyms
- Neritos flavibrunnea Dognin, 1911

Species of moth

Trichromia flavibrunnea is a moth in the family Erebidae. It was described by Paul Dognin in 1911. It is found in French Guiana.
