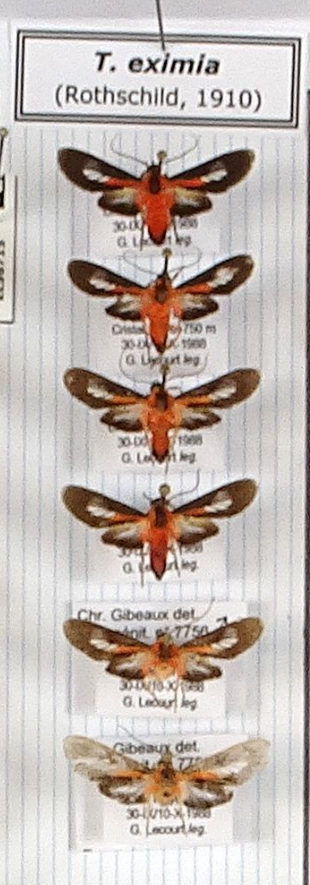

Scientific classification
- Domain: Eukaryota
- Kingdom: Animalia
- Phylum: Arthropoda
- Class: Insecta
- Order: Lepidoptera
- Superfamily: Noctuoidea
- Family: Erebidae
- Subfamily: Arctiinae
- Genus: Trichromia
- Species: T. eximius

Binomial name
- Trichromia eximius (Rothschild, 1910)

Synonyms
- Neritos eximius Rothschild, 1910

= Trichromia eximius =

Species of moth

Trichromia eximius is a moth in the family Erebidae. It was described by Walter Rothschild in 1910. It is found in Peru.
