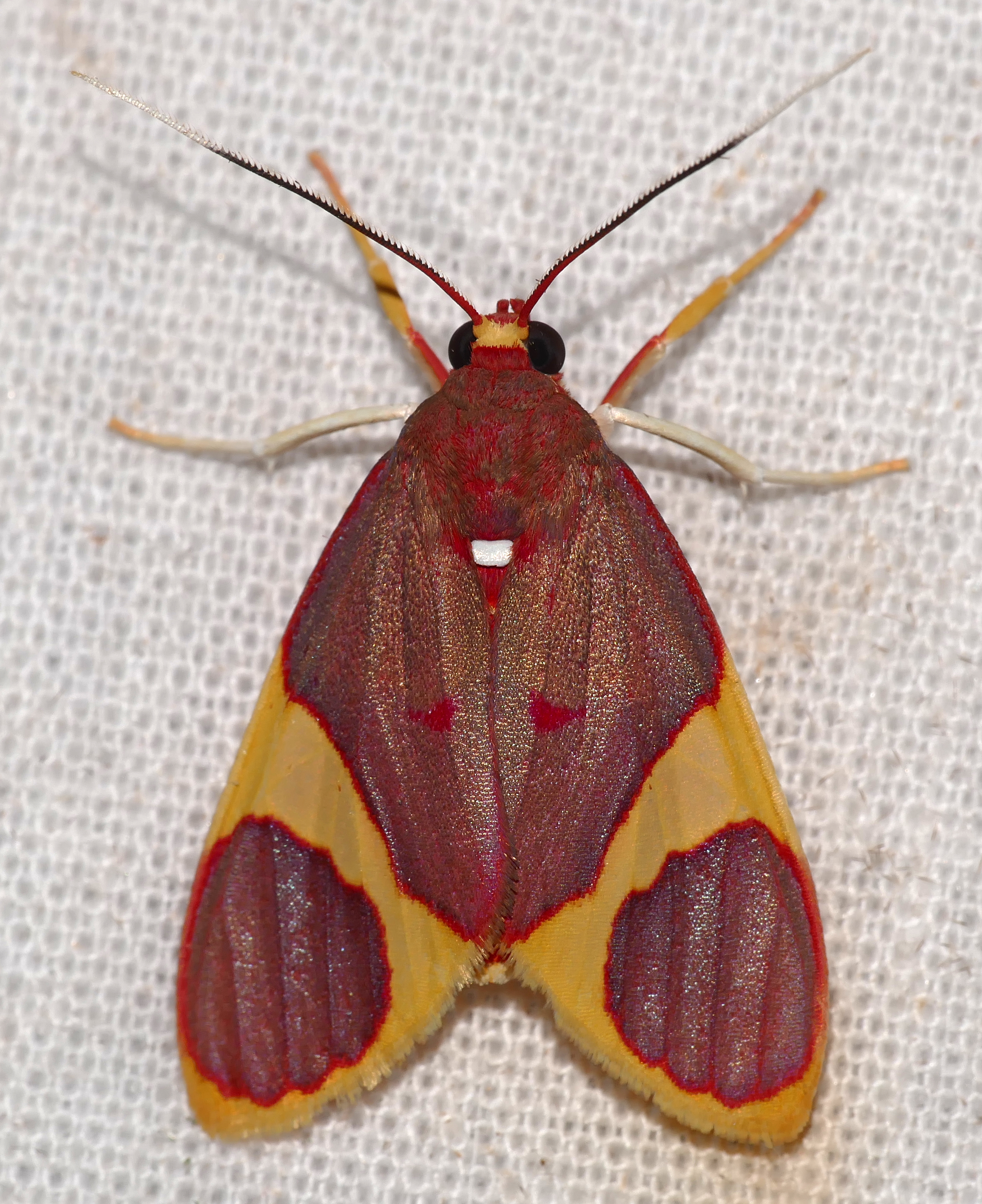

Scientific classification
- Domain: Eukaryota
- Kingdom: Animalia
- Phylum: Arthropoda
- Class: Insecta
- Order: Lepidoptera
- Superfamily: Noctuoidea
- Family: Erebidae
- Subfamily: Arctiinae
- Genus: Trichromia
- Species: T. aurantiipennis

Binomial name
- Trichromia aurantiipennis (Rothschild, 1909)

Synonyms
- Paranerita aurantiipennis Rothschild, 1909

= Trichromia aurantiipennis =

Species of moth

Trichromia aurantiipennis is a moth in the family Erebidae. It was described by Walter Rothschild in 1909. It is found in French Guiana, Brazil and Peru.
