= Hyponerita =

Scientific classification
- Kingdom: Animalia
- Phylum: Arthropoda
- Class: Insecta
- Order: Lepidoptera
- Superfamily: Noctuoidea
- Family: Erebidae
- Subfamily: Arctiinae
- Subtribe: Phaegopterina
- Genus: Hyponerita; Hampson, 1901

Genus of moths

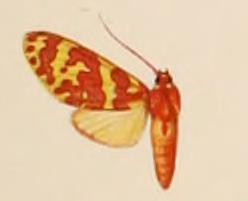
Hyponerita

Hyponerita is a genus of moths in the family Erebidae erected by George Hampson in 1901.

== Species ==
- Hyponerita amelia Schaus, 1911
- Hyponerita brueckneri Gaede, 1928
- Hyponerita hamoia Joicey & Talbot, 1916
- Hyponerita incerta Schaus, 1905
- Hyponerita ishima Schaus, 1933
- Hyponerita lavinia (Druce, 1890)
- Hyponerita parallela Gaede, 1928
- Hyponerita pinon (Druce, 1911)
- Hyponerita rhodocraspis Hampson, 1909
- Hyponerita rosaceata Watson & Goodger, 1986
- Hyponerita similis Rothschild, 1909
- Hyponerita tipolis (Druce, 1896)
