= Neonerita hyalinata =

Scientific classification
- Kingdom: Animalia
- Phylum: Arthropoda
- Clade: Pancrustacea
- Class: Insecta
- Order: Lepidoptera
- Superfamily: Noctuoidea
- Family: Erebidae
- Subfamily: Arctiinae
- Genus: Neonerita
- Species: N. hyalinata

Binomial name
- Neonerita hyalinata (Reich, 1933)

Synonyms
- Automolis hyalinata Reich, 1933; Paranerita hyalinata (Reich, 1933)

Species of moth

Neonerita hyalinata is a species of moth in the subfamily Arctiinae. It was first described by Paul Reich in 1933. It is found in Peru.
