= Glaucostola beneluzi =

Scientific classification
- Kingdom: Animalia
- Phylum: Arthropoda
- Class: Insecta
- Order: Lepidoptera
- Superfamily: Noctuoidea
- Family: Erebidae
- Subfamily: Arctiinae
- Genus: Haemanota
- Species: H. beneluzi

Binomial name
- Haemanota beneluzi Toulgoët, 2001

Species of moth

Haemanota beneluzi is a moth of the family Erebidae. It is found in French Guiana.

It is later Glaucostola beneluzi (Toulgoët, 2001) per Laguerre, 2015: 164.
