= Trichromia irregularis =

Scientific classification
- Kingdom: Animalia
- Phylum: Arthropoda
- Clade: Pancrustacea
- Class: Insecta
- Order: Lepidoptera
- Superfamily: Noctuoidea
- Family: Erebidae
- Subfamily: Arctiinae
- Genus: Trichromia
- Species: T. irregularis

Binomial name
- Trichromia irregularis (Rothschild, 1909)

Synonyms
- Paranerita irregularis Rothschild, 1909

Species of moth

Trichromia irregularis is a species of moth in the subfamily Arctiinae. It was first described by Walter Rothschild in 1909. It is found in Suriname.
