= Trichromia orbifer =

Scientific classification
- Kingdom: Animalia
- Phylum: Arthropoda
- Clade: Pancrustacea
- Class: Insecta
- Order: Lepidoptera
- Superfamily: Noctuoidea
- Family: Erebidae
- Subfamily: Arctiinae
- Genus: Trichromia
- Species: T. orbifer

Binomial name
- Trichromia orbifer (Hampson, 1916)

Synonyms
- Paranerita orbifer Hampson, 1916

Species of moth

Trichromia orbifer is a species of moth in the subfamily Arctiinae. It was first described by George Hampson in 1916. It is found in Colombia.
