= Haemanota fallaciosa =

Scientific classification
- Kingdom: Animalia
- Phylum: Arthropoda
- Class: Insecta
- Order: Lepidoptera
- Superfamily: Noctuoidea
- Family: Erebidae
- Subfamily: Arctiinae
- Genus: Haemanota
- Species: H. fallaciosa

Binomial name
- Haemanota fallaciosa (Toulgoët, 1995)

Synonyms
- Neritos fallaciosa Toulgoët, 1995

Species of moth

Haemanota fallaciosa is a moth of the family Erebidae. It was described by Hervé de Toulgoët in 1995. It is found in French Guiana.
