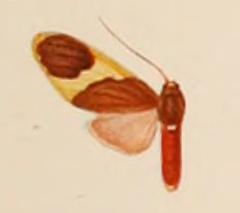

Scientific classification
- Kingdom: Animalia
- Phylum: Arthropoda
- Clade: Pancrustacea
- Class: Insecta
- Order: Lepidoptera
- Superfamily: Noctuoidea
- Family: Erebidae
- Subfamily: Arctiinae
- Genus: Trichromia
- Species: T. inequalis

Binomial name
- Trichromia inequalis (Rothschild, 1909)

Synonyms
- Neritos inequalis Rothschild, 1909; Paranerita inaequalis(Rothschild, 1909)

= Trichromia inequalis =

Species of moth

Trichromia inequalis is a species of moth in the subfamily Arctiinae that was first described by Walter Rothschild in 1909. It is found in Bolivia, Peru, Brazil and Suriname.
