= Trichromia metaxantha =

Scientific classification
- Kingdom: Animalia
- Phylum: Arthropoda
- Clade: Pancrustacea
- Class: Insecta
- Order: Lepidoptera
- Superfamily: Noctuoidea
- Family: Erebidae
- Subfamily: Arctiinae
- Genus: Trichromia
- Species: T. metaxantha

Binomial name
- Trichromia metaxantha (Dognin, 1914)

Synonyms
- Paranerita metaxantha Dognin, 1914

Species of moth

Trichromia metaxantha is a species of moth in the subfamily Arctiinae. It was first described by Paul Dognin in 1914. It is found in Colombia.
