= Haemanota =

Scientific classification
- Kingdom: Animalia
- Phylum: Arthropoda
- Class: Insecta
- Order: Lepidoptera
- Superfamily: Noctuoidea
- Family: Erebidae
- Subfamily: Arctiinae
- Subtribe: Phaegopterina
- Genus: Haemanota; Hampson, 1901

Type species
- Haemanota rubriceps Hampson, 1901

Genus of moths

Haemanota is a genus of moths in the family Erebidae. The genus was erected by George Hampson in 1901.

== Species ==
- Haemanota abdominalis (Rothschild, 1909)
- Haemanota affinis (Rothschild, 1909)
- Haemanota alboapicalis (Rothschild, 1909)
- Haemanota beneluzi Toulgoët, 2001
- Haemanota chrysozona (Schaus, 1905)
- Haemanota concelata Laguerre, 2005
- Haemanota croceicauda (Toulgoët, 1987)
- Haemanota croceicorpus (Toulgoët, 1990)
- Haemanota fallaciosa (Toulgoët, 1995)
- Haemanota fereunicolor (Toulgoët, 1987)
- Haemanota flavipurpurea (Dognin, 1914)
- Haemanota gibeauxi (Toulgoët, 1989)
- Haemanota griseotincta (Rothschild, 1909)
- Haemanota haemabasis (Dognin, 1914)
- Haemanota hermieri Toulgoët, 2000
- Haemanota improvisa (Dognin, 1923)
- Haemanota kindli Toulgoët, 1992
- Haemanota kindliana Toulgoët, 2001
- Haemanota maculosa (Schaus, 1905)
- Haemanota nigricollum (Dognin, 1892)
- Haemanota patricki (Toulgoët, 1990)
- Haemanota prophaea (Schaus, 1905)
- Haemanota rubriceps Hampson, 1901
- Haemanota sanguidorsia (Schaus, 1905)
- Haemanota senecauxi Toulgoët, 1992
- Haemanota syntomoides (Rothschild, 1910)
- Haemanota vicinula Toulgoët, 1997
