= Trichromia flavoroseus =

Scientific classification
- Kingdom: Animalia
- Phylum: Arthropoda
- Class: Insecta
- Order: Lepidoptera
- Superfamily: Noctuoidea
- Family: Erebidae
- Subfamily: Arctiinae
- Genus: Trichromia
- Species: T. flavoroseus

Binomial name
- Trichromia flavoroseus (Walker, 1855)

Synonyms
- Evius flavoroseus Walker, 1855

Species of moth

Trichromia flavoroseus is a moth in the family Erebidae. It was described by Francis Walker in 1855. It is found in Mexico and Honduras.
