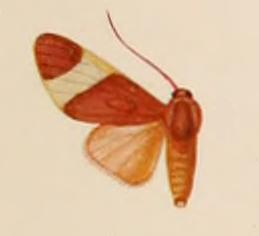

Scientific classification
- Domain: Eukaryota
- Kingdom: Animalia
- Phylum: Arthropoda
- Class: Insecta
- Order: Lepidoptera
- Superfamily: Noctuoidea
- Family: Erebidae
- Subfamily: Arctiinae
- Genus: Trichromia
- Species: T. drucei

Binomial name
- Trichromia drucei (Rothschild, 1909)

Synonyms
- Neritos drucei Rothschild, 1909

= Trichromia drucei =

Species of moth

Trichromia drucei is a species of moth from the family Erebidae first described by Walter Rothschild in 1909. It is found in French Guiana and Suriname.
