= Trichromia cyclopera =

Scientific classification
- Kingdom: Animalia
- Phylum: Arthropoda
- Class: Insecta
- Order: Lepidoptera
- Superfamily: Noctuoidea
- Family: Erebidae
- Subfamily: Arctiinae
- Genus: Trichromia
- Species: T. cyclopera

Binomial name
- Trichromia cyclopera (Hampson, 1905)

Synonyms
- Neritos cyclopera Hampson, 1905

Species of moth

Trichromia cyclopera is a moth in the family Erebidae. It was described by George Hampson in 1905. It is found in French Guiana, Guyana, Amazonas and Ecuador.
