= Pseudepimolis rhyssa =

Scientific classification
- Domain: Eukaryota
- Kingdom: Animalia
- Phylum: Arthropoda
- Class: Insecta
- Order: Lepidoptera
- Superfamily: Noctuoidea
- Family: Erebidae
- Subfamily: Arctiinae
- Genus: Pseudepimolis
- Species: P. rhyssa

Binomial name
- Pseudepimolis rhyssa (H. Druce, 1906)

Synonyms
- Idalus rhyssa H. Druce, 1906; Premolis rhyssa (H. Druce, 1906)

Species of moth

Pseudepimolis rhyssa is a moth in the family Erebidae first described by Herbert Druce in 1906. It is found in Peru.
