= Trichromia irma =

Scientific classification
- Kingdom: Animalia
- Phylum: Arthropoda
- Clade: Pancrustacea
- Class: Insecta
- Order: Lepidoptera
- Superfamily: Noctuoidea
- Family: Erebidae
- Subfamily: Arctiinae
- Genus: Trichromia
- Species: T. irma

Binomial name
- Trichromia irma (Schaus, 1920)

Synonyms
- Paranerita irma Schaus, 1920

Species of moth

Trichromia irma is a species of moth in the subfamily Arctiinae. It was first described by William Schaus in 1920. It is found in Guatemala.
