= Trichromia patara =

Scientific classification
- Kingdom: Animalia
- Phylum: Arthropoda
- Clade: Pancrustacea
- Class: Insecta
- Order: Lepidoptera
- Superfamily: Noctuoidea
- Family: Erebidae
- Subfamily: Arctiinae
- Genus: Trichromia
- Species: T. patara

Binomial name
- Trichromia patara (H. Druce, 1896)

Synonyms
- Neritos patara H. Druce, 1896; Paranerita patara (H. Druce, 1896)

Species of moth

Trichromia patara is a species of moth in the subfamily Arctiinae. It was first described by Herbert Druce in 1896. It is found in Guyana and Brazil.
