= Haemanota griseotincta =

Scientific classification
- Domain: Eukaryota
- Kingdom: Animalia
- Phylum: Arthropoda
- Class: Insecta
- Order: Lepidoptera
- Superfamily: Noctuoidea
- Family: Erebidae
- Subfamily: Arctiinae
- Genus: Haemanota
- Species: H. griseotincta

Binomial name
- Haemanota griseotincta (Rothschild, 1909)

Synonyms
- Neritos griseotincta Rothschild, 1909

Species of moth

Haemanota griseotincta is a moth of the family Erebidae. It was described by Walter Rothschild in 1909. It is found in French Guiana and Suriname.
