= Trichromia oroyana =

Scientific classification
- Kingdom: Animalia
- Phylum: Arthropoda
- Clade: Pancrustacea
- Class: Insecta
- Order: Lepidoptera
- Superfamily: Noctuoidea
- Family: Erebidae
- Subfamily: Arctiinae
- Genus: Trichromia
- Species: T. oroyana

Binomial name
- Trichromia oroyana (Rothschild, 1922)

Synonyms
- Paranerita oroyana Rothschild, 1922

Species of moth

Trichromia oroyana is a species of moth in the subfamily Arctiinae. It was first described by Walter Rothschild in 1922. It is found in Peru.
