= Haemanota kindli =

Scientific classification
- Kingdom: Animalia
- Phylum: Arthropoda
- Class: Insecta
- Order: Lepidoptera
- Superfamily: Noctuoidea
- Family: Erebidae
- Subfamily: Arctiinae
- Genus: Haemanota
- Species: H. kindli

Binomial name
- Haemanota kindli Toulgoët, 1992

Species of moth

Haemanota kindli is a moth of the family Erebidae. It was described by Hervé de Toulgoët in 1992. It is found in French Guiana.
