= Haemanota gibeauxi =

Scientific classification
- Kingdom: Animalia
- Phylum: Arthropoda
- Class: Insecta
- Order: Lepidoptera
- Superfamily: Noctuoidea
- Family: Erebidae
- Subfamily: Arctiinae
- Genus: Haemanota
- Species: H. gibeauxi

Binomial name
- Haemanota gibeauxi (Toulgoët, 1989)

Synonyms
- Neritos gibeauxi Toulgoët, 1989

Species of moth

Haemanota gibeauxi is a moth of the family Erebidae. It was described by Hervé de Toulgoët in 1989. It is found in French Guiana.
