= Hyponerita pinon =

Scientific classification
- Domain: Eukaryota
- Kingdom: Animalia
- Phylum: Arthropoda
- Class: Insecta
- Order: Lepidoptera
- Superfamily: Noctuoidea
- Family: Erebidae
- Subfamily: Arctiinae
- Genus: Hyponerita
- Species: H. pinon

Binomial name
- Hyponerita pinon (H. Druce, 1911)

Synonyms
- Automolis pinon H. Druce, 1911

Species of moth

Hyponerita pinon is a moth of the subfamily Arctiinae. It was described by Herbert Druce in 1911. It is found in Brazil.
