= Trichromia pectinata =

Scientific classification
- Domain: Eukaryota
- Kingdom: Animalia
- Phylum: Arthropoda
- Class: Insecta
- Order: Lepidoptera
- Superfamily: Noctuoidea
- Family: Erebidae
- Subfamily: Arctiinae
- Genus: Trichromia
- Species: T. pectinata

Binomial name
- Trichromia pectinata (Rothschild, 1935)

Synonyms
- Neritos pectinata Rothschild, 1935

Species of moth

Trichromia pectinata is a moth in the family Erebidae. It was described by Walter Rothschild in 1935. It is found in north-eastern Brazil.
