= Trichromia discophora =

Scientific classification
- Kingdom: Animalia
- Phylum: Arthropoda
- Class: Insecta
- Order: Lepidoptera
- Superfamily: Noctuoidea
- Family: Erebidae
- Subfamily: Arctiinae
- Genus: Trichromia
- Species: T. discophora

Binomial name
- Trichromia discophora (Hampson, 1916)

Synonyms
- Neritos discophora Hampson, 1916

Species of moth

Trichromia discophora is a moth in the family Erebidae. It was described by George Hampson in 1916. It is found in Peru.
