= Trichromia grandis =

Scientific classification
- Kingdom: Animalia
- Phylum: Arthropoda
- Clade: Pancrustacea
- Class: Insecta
- Order: Lepidoptera
- Superfamily: Noctuoidea
- Family: Erebidae
- Subfamily: Arctiinae
- Genus: Trichromia
- Species: T. grandis

Binomial name
- Trichromia grandis (Rothschild, 1909)

Synonyms
- Hyponerita grandis Rothschild, 1909; Paranerita grandis (Rothschild, 1909)

Species of moth

Trichromia grandis is a species of moth in the subfamily Arctiinae. It was first described by Walter Rothschild in 1909. It is found in Peru.
