= Trichromia postflavida =

Scientific classification
- Kingdom: Animalia
- Phylum: Arthropoda
- Clade: Pancrustacea
- Class: Insecta
- Order: Lepidoptera
- Superfamily: Noctuoidea
- Family: Erebidae
- Subfamily: Arctiinae
- Genus: Trichromia
- Species: T. postflavida

Binomial name
- Trichromia postflavida (Toulgoët, 1982)

Synonyms
- Paranerita postflavida Toulgoët, 1982

Species of moth

Trichromia postflavida is a moth in the family Erebidae. It was first described by Hervé de Toulgoët in 1982 as Paranerita postflavida. It is found in French Guiana.
