= Haemanota haemabasis =

Scientific classification
- Domain: Eukaryota
- Kingdom: Animalia
- Phylum: Arthropoda
- Class: Insecta
- Order: Lepidoptera
- Superfamily: Noctuoidea
- Family: Erebidae
- Subfamily: Arctiinae
- Genus: Haemanota
- Species: H. haemabasis

Binomial name
- Haemanota haemabasis (Dognin, 1914)

Synonyms
- Paranerita haemabasis Dognin, 1914

Species of moth

Haemanota haemabasis is a moth of the family Erebidae. It is found in Colombia.
