= Haemanota croceicorpus =

Scientific classification
- Kingdom: Animalia
- Phylum: Arthropoda
- Class: Insecta
- Order: Lepidoptera
- Superfamily: Noctuoidea
- Family: Erebidae
- Subfamily: Arctiinae
- Genus: Haemanota
- Species: H. croceicorpus

Binomial name
- Haemanota croceicorpus (Toulgoët, 1990)

Synonyms
- Neritos croceicorpus Toulgoët, 1990

Species of moth

Haemanota croceicorpus is a moth of the family Erebidae first described by Hervé de Toulgoët in 1990. It is found in South America.
