= Trichromia roseata =

Scientific classification
- Domain: Eukaryota
- Kingdom: Animalia
- Phylum: Arthropoda
- Class: Insecta
- Order: Lepidoptera
- Superfamily: Noctuoidea
- Family: Erebidae
- Subfamily: Arctiinae
- Genus: Trichromia
- Species: T. roseata

Binomial name
- Trichromia roseata (Gaede, 1928)

Synonyms
- Neritos roseata Gaede, 1928

Species of moth

Trichromia roseata is a moth in the family Erebidae. It was described by Max Gaede in 1928. It is found in Colombia.
