= Hyponerita brueckneri =

Scientific classification
- Domain: Eukaryota
- Kingdom: Animalia
- Phylum: Arthropoda
- Class: Insecta
- Order: Lepidoptera
- Superfamily: Noctuoidea
- Family: Erebidae
- Subfamily: Arctiinae
- Genus: Hyponerita
- Species: H. brueckneri

Binomial name
- Hyponerita brueckneri Gaede, 1928

Synonyms
- Trichromia brueckneri (Gaede, 1928)

Species of moth

Hyponerita brueckneri is a moth of the subfamily Arctiinae. It was described by Max Gaede in 1928. It is found in Guatemala.
