= Neonerita dorsipuncta =

Scientific classification
- Kingdom: Animalia
- Phylum: Arthropoda
- Class: Insecta
- Order: Lepidoptera
- Superfamily: Noctuoidea
- Family: Erebidae
- Subfamily: Arctiinae
- Genus: Neonerita
- Species: N. dorsipuncta

Binomial name
- Neonerita dorsipuncta Hampson, 1901

Species of moth

Neonerita dorsipuncta is a moth of the family Erebidae. It was described by George Hampson in 1901. It is found in French Guiana, Brazil, Venezuela, Bolivia and Mexico.
