= Trichromia diversa =

Scientific classification
- Kingdom: Animalia
- Phylum: Arthropoda
- Clade: Pancrustacea
- Class: Insecta
- Order: Lepidoptera
- Superfamily: Noctuoidea
- Family: Erebidae
- Subfamily: Arctiinae
- Genus: Trichromia
- Species: T. diversa

Binomial name
- Trichromia diversa (Rothschild, 1917)

Synonyms
- Paranerita diversa Rothschild, 1917

Species of moth

Trichromia diversa is a species of moth in the subfamily Arctiinae. It was first described by Walter Rothschild in 1917. It is found in Venezuela.
