= Trichromia quadricolor =

Scientific classification
- Kingdom: Animalia
- Phylum: Arthropoda
- Class: Insecta
- Order: Lepidoptera
- Superfamily: Noctuoidea
- Family: Erebidae
- Subfamily: Arctiinae
- Genus: Trichromia
- Species: T. quadricolor

Binomial name
- Trichromia quadricolor Toulgoët, 1982

Species of moth

Trichromia quadricolor is a moth in the family Erebidae. It was described by Hervé de Toulgoët in 1982. It is found in French Guiana.
