= Trichromia metachryseis =

Scientific classification
- Kingdom: Animalia
- Phylum: Arthropoda
- Clade: Pancrustacea
- Class: Insecta
- Order: Lepidoptera
- Superfamily: Noctuoidea
- Family: Erebidae
- Subfamily: Arctiinae
- Genus: Trichromia
- Species: T. metachryseis

Binomial name
- Trichromia metachryseis (Hampson, 1905)

Synonyms
- Parevia metachryseis Hampson, 1905

Species of moth

Trichromia metachryseis is a moth of the family Erebidae first described by George Hampson in 1905. It is found in French Guinea and Suriname.
