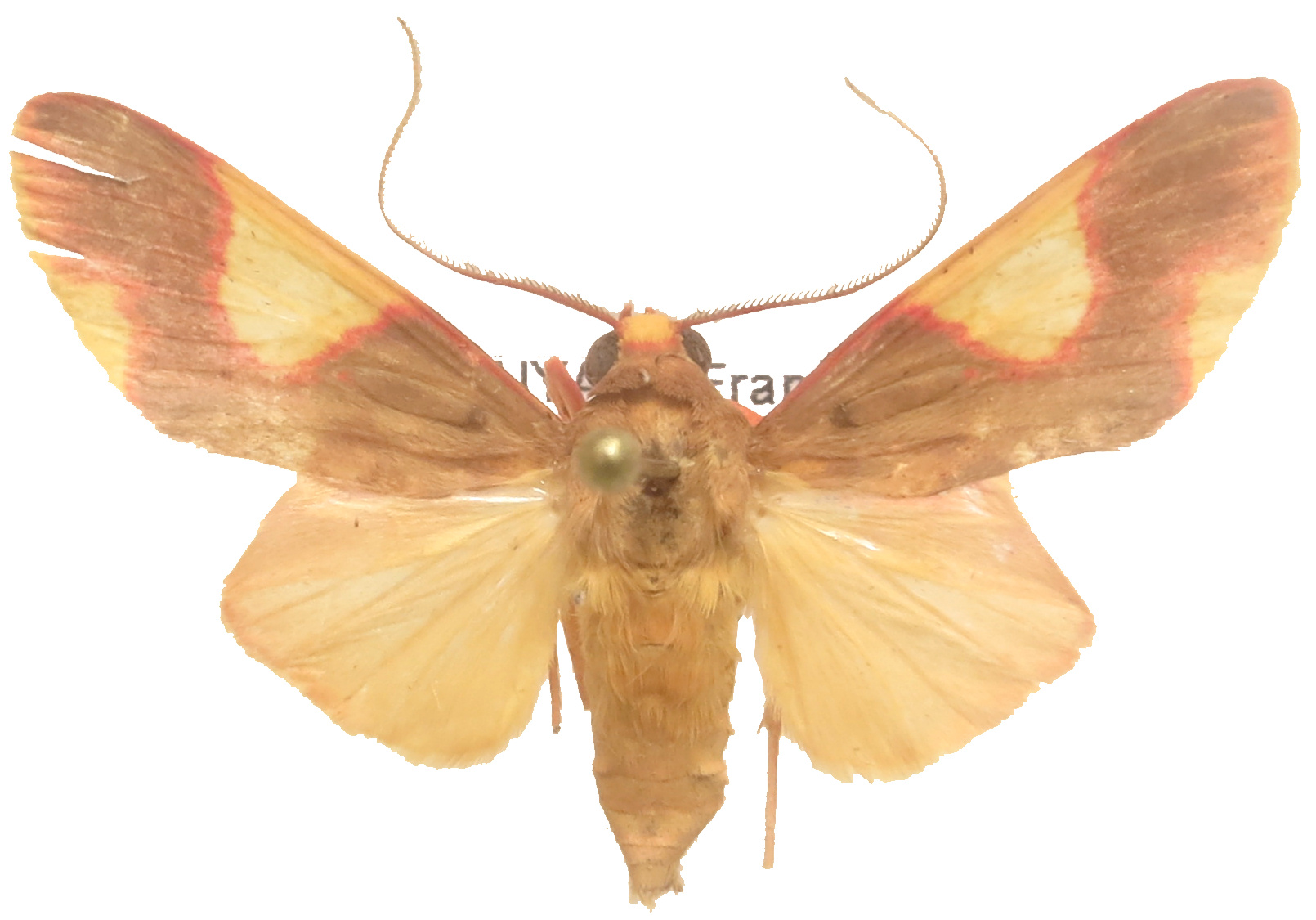
- From French Guiana

Scientific classification
- Domain: Eukaryota
- Kingdom: Animalia
- Phylum: Arthropoda
- Class: Insecta
- Order: Lepidoptera
- Superfamily: Noctuoidea
- Family: Erebidae
- Subfamily: Arctiinae
- Genus: Trichromia
- Species: T. gaudialis

Binomial name
- Trichromia gaudialis (Schaus, 1905)

Synonyms
- Neritos gaudialis Schaus, 1905; Paranerita suffusa Rothschild, 1909; Paranerita trinitatis Rothschild, 1909

= Trichromia gaudialis =

Species of moth

Trichromia gaudialis is a moth in the family Erebidae. It was described by William Schaus in 1905. It is found in French Guiana and Trinidad.

== Subspecies ==
- Trichromia gaudialis gaudialis (French Guiana)
- Trichromia gaudialis trinitatis (Rothschild, 1909) (Trinidad)
