= Trichromia perversa =

Scientific classification
- Domain: Eukaryota
- Kingdom: Animalia
- Phylum: Arthropoda
- Class: Insecta
- Order: Lepidoptera
- Superfamily: Noctuoidea
- Family: Erebidae
- Subfamily: Arctiinae
- Genus: Trichromia
- Species: T. perversa

Binomial name
- Trichromia perversa Rothschild, 1909

Synonyms
- Neritos perversa Rothschild, 1909; Neonerita perversa

Species of moth

Trichromia perversa is a moth of the family Erebidae. It was described by Walter Rothschild in 1909. It is found in the Brazilian state of Amazonas, French Guiana, Suriname and Panama.
