= Trichromia sisenna =

Scientific classification
- Kingdom: Animalia
- Phylum: Arthropoda
- Clade: Pancrustacea
- Class: Insecta
- Order: Lepidoptera
- Superfamily: Noctuoidea
- Family: Erebidae
- Subfamily: Arctiinae
- Genus: Trichromia
- Species: T. sisenna

Binomial name
- Trichromia sisenna (H. Druce, 1899)

Synonyms
- Evius sisenna H. Druce, 1899; Parevia sisenna (H. Druce, 1899)

Species of moth

Trichromia sisenna is a species of moth in the subfamily Arctiinae that was first described by Herbert Druce in 1899. It is found in Brazil, Suriname and Peru.
