= Haemanota alboapicalis =

Scientific classification
- Domain: Eukaryota
- Kingdom: Animalia
- Phylum: Arthropoda
- Class: Insecta
- Order: Lepidoptera
- Superfamily: Noctuoidea
- Family: Erebidae
- Subfamily: Arctiinae
- Genus: Haemanota
- Species: H. alboapicalis

Binomial name
- Haemanota alboapicalis (Rothschild, 1909)

Synonyms
- Araeomolis alboapicalis Rothschild, 1909

Species of moth

Haemanota alboapicalis is a moth of the family Erebidae. It was described by Walter Rothschild in 1909. It is found in French Guiana and Suriname.
