= Neonerita pulchra =

Scientific classification
- Kingdom: Animalia
- Phylum: Arthropoda
- Class: Insecta
- Order: Lepidoptera
- Superfamily: Noctuoidea
- Family: Erebidae
- Subfamily: Arctiinae
- Genus: Neonerita
- Species: N. pulchra

Binomial name
- Neonerita pulchra Toulgoët, 1983

Species of moth

Neonerita pulchra is a moth of the family Erebidae. It was described by Hervé de Toulgoët in 1983. It is found in Panama.
