= Trichromia griseata =

Scientific classification
- Kingdom: Animalia
- Phylum: Arthropoda
- Clade: Pancrustacea
- Class: Insecta
- Order: Lepidoptera
- Superfamily: Noctuoidea
- Family: Erebidae
- Subfamily: Arctiinae
- Genus: Trichromia
- Species: T. griseata

Binomial name
- Trichromia griseata (Rothschild, 1909)

Synonyms
- Araeomolis griseata Rothschild, 1909; Parevia griseata (Rothschild, 1909)

Species of moth

Trichromia griseata is a species of moth in the subfamily Arctiinae that was first described in 1909 by Walter Rothschild. It is found in Brazil.
