= Trichromia bione =

Scientific classification
- Kingdom: Animalia
- Phylum: Arthropoda
- Clade: Pancrustacea
- Class: Insecta
- Order: Lepidoptera
- Superfamily: Noctuoidea
- Family: Erebidae
- Subfamily: Arctiinae
- Genus: Trichromia
- Species: T. bione

Binomial name
- Trichromia bione (E. D. Jones, 1914)

Synonyms
- Paranerita bione E. D. Jones, 1914

Species of moth

Trichromia bione is a species of moth in the subfamily Arctiinae. It was first described by E. Dukinfield Jones in 1914. It is found in Brazil.
