= Trichromia flexuosa =

Scientific classification
- Kingdom: Animalia
- Phylum: Arthropoda
- Clade: Pancrustacea
- Class: Insecta
- Order: Lepidoptera
- Superfamily: Noctuoidea
- Family: Erebidae
- Subfamily: Arctiinae
- Genus: Trichromia
- Species: T. flexuosa

Binomial name
- Trichromia flexuosa (Schaus, 1911)

Synonyms
- Paranerita flexuosa Schaus, 1911

Species of moth

Trichromia flexuosa is a species of moth in the subfamily Arctiinae. It was first described by William Schaus in 1911. It is found in Costa Rica.
