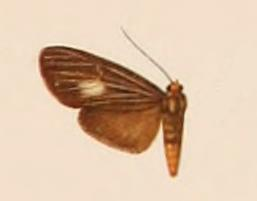

Scientific classification
- Domain: Eukaryota
- Kingdom: Animalia
- Phylum: Arthropoda
- Class: Insecta
- Order: Lepidoptera
- Superfamily: Noctuoidea
- Family: Erebidae
- Subfamily: Arctiinae
- Genus: Haemanota
- Species: H. abdominalis

Binomial name
- Haemanota abdominalis (Rothschild, 1909)

Synonyms
- Neritos abdominalis Rothschild, 1909; Trichromia abdominalis

= Haemanota abdominalis =

Species of moth

Haemanota abdominalis is a moth of the family Erebidae first described by Walter Rothschild in 1909. It is found in Brazil.
