= Trichromia phaeocrota =

Scientific classification
- Kingdom: Animalia
- Phylum: Arthropoda
- Clade: Pancrustacea
- Class: Insecta
- Order: Lepidoptera
- Superfamily: Noctuoidea
- Family: Erebidae
- Subfamily: Arctiinae
- Genus: Trichromia
- Species: T. phaeocrota

Binomial name
- Trichromia phaeocrota (Dognin, 1911)

Synonyms
- Paranerita phaeocrota Dognin, 1911

Species of moth

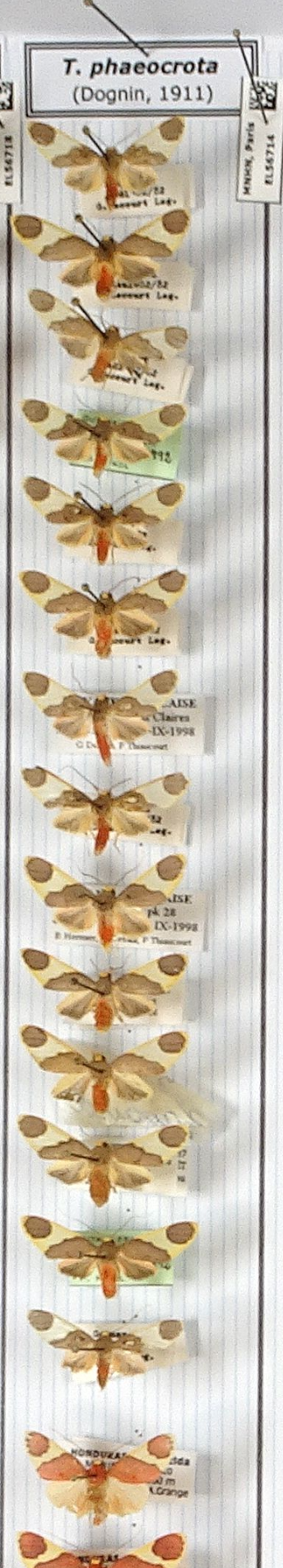
Drawer of Trichromia moth species of the National Museum of Natural History, France

Trichromia phaeocrota is a moth in the family Erebidae. It is found in French Guiana and Venezuela.

== Taxonomy ==
Trichromia phaeocrota was first described by Paul Dognin in 1911 and originally named Paranerita phaeocrota. George Francis Hampson described this species in 1920 in his Catalogue of the Lepidoptera Phalænæ in the British museum. The male type specimen, collected in French Guiana at Saint Jean du Maroni, is held at the Natural History Museum, London.

== Description ==
Hampson described this species as follows:

♂. Head yellow, the frons with brown bar; antennae brown, white towards tips : thorax purplish brown; pectus and legs white, the fore femora tinged with crimson above; abdomen crimson, the 1st two segments with dorsal brown spots, the anal tuft and ventral surface white. Fore wing purplish brown to the costa before middle and thence to termen at submedian fold, the outer edge of this area angled at lower angle of cell, then sinuous: the apical half of wing pale semi hyaline yellow with a large round purplish-brown subapical patch with some crimson above it on costa and slightly sinuous outer edge. Hind wing reddish, the inner half suffused with crimson ami with large triangular brownish patch from termen to below end of cell. Underside of fore wing with the tuft of hair in the fovea white; hind wing yellow tinged with crimson.
