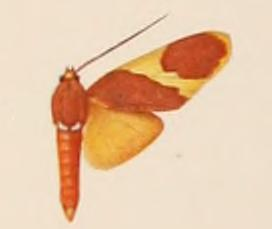

Scientific classification
- Kingdom: Animalia
- Phylum: Arthropoda
- Clade: Pancrustacea
- Class: Insecta
- Order: Lepidoptera
- Superfamily: Noctuoidea
- Family: Erebidae
- Subfamily: Arctiinae
- Genus: Trichromia
- Species: T. triangularis

Binomial name
- Trichromia triangularis (Rothschild, 1909)

Synonyms
- Neritos triangularis Rothschild, 1909; Paranerita triangularis (Rothschild, 1909)

= Trichromia triangularis =

Species of moth

Trichromia triangularis is a species of moth in the subfamily Arctiinae that was first described by Walter Rothschild in 1909. It is found in Peru and Guyana.
