= Trichromia parnelli =

Scientific classification
- Kingdom: Animalia
- Phylum: Arthropoda
- Clade: Pancrustacea
- Class: Insecta
- Order: Lepidoptera
- Superfamily: Noctuoidea
- Family: Erebidae
- Subfamily: Arctiinae
- Genus: Trichromia
- Species: T. parnelli

Binomial name
- Trichromia parnelli (Schaus, 1911)

Synonyms
- Parevia parnelli Schaus, 1911

Species of moth

Trichromia parnelli is a species of moth in the subfamily Arctiinae that was first described by William Schaus in 1911. It is found in Costa Rica.
