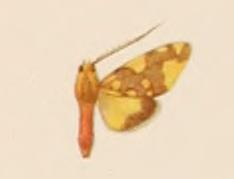

Scientific classification
- Kingdom: Animalia
- Phylum: Arthropoda
- Clade: Pancrustacea
- Class: Insecta
- Order: Lepidoptera
- Superfamily: Noctuoidea
- Family: Erebidae
- Subfamily: Arctiinae
- Genus: Trichromia
- Species: T. mathani

Binomial name
- Trichromia mathani (Rothschild, 1909)

Synonyms
- Parevia mathani Rothschild, 1909

= Trichromia mathani =

Species of moth

Trichromia mathani is a species of moth in the subfamily Arctiinae that was first described by Walter Rothschild in 1909. It is found in Brazil.
