= Trichromia cucufas =

Scientific classification
- Domain: Eukaryota
- Kingdom: Animalia
- Phylum: Arthropoda
- Class: Insecta
- Order: Lepidoptera
- Superfamily: Noctuoidea
- Family: Erebidae
- Subfamily: Arctiinae
- Genus: Trichromia
- Species: T. cucufas

Binomial name
- Trichromia cucufas (Schaus, 1924)

Synonyms
- Neritos cucufas Schaus, 1924

Species of moth

Trichromia cucufas is a moth in the family Erebidae. It was described by William Schaus in 1924. It is found in French Guiana, Guyana and Bolivia.
