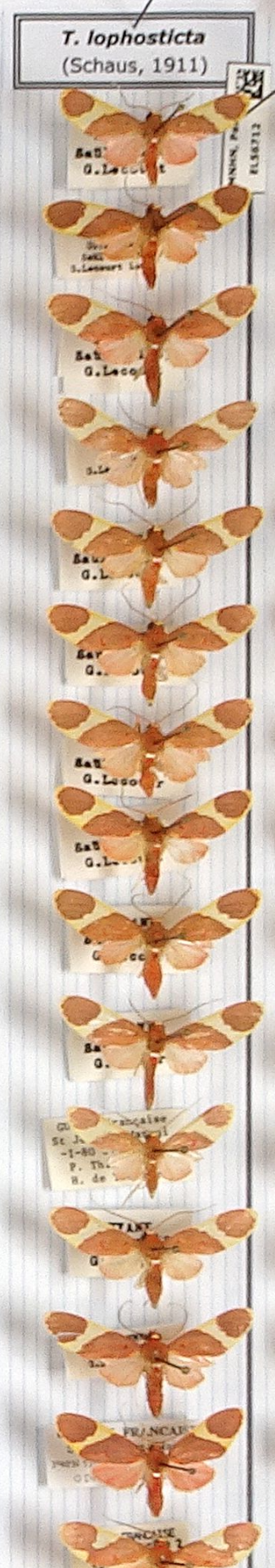

Scientific classification
- Domain: Eukaryota
- Kingdom: Animalia
- Phylum: Arthropoda
- Class: Insecta
- Order: Lepidoptera
- Superfamily: Noctuoidea
- Family: Erebidae
- Subfamily: Arctiinae
- Genus: Trichromia
- Species: T. lophosticta

Binomial name
- Trichromia lophosticta (Schaus, 1911)

Synonyms
- Paranerita lophosticta Schaus, 1911

= Trichromia lophosticta =

Species of moth

Trichromia lophosticta is a moth in the family Erebidae. It was described by William Schaus in 1911. It is found in French Guiana, Bolivia and Costa Rica.
