= Trichromia metapyria =

Scientific classification
- Domain: Eukaryota
- Kingdom: Animalia
- Phylum: Arthropoda
- Class: Insecta
- Order: Lepidoptera
- Superfamily: Noctuoidea
- Family: Erebidae
- Subfamily: Arctiinae
- Genus: Trichromia
- Species: T. metapyria

Binomial name
- Trichromia metapyria (Dognin, 1907)

Synonyms
- Paranerita metapyria Dognin, 1907

Species of moth

Trichromia metapyria is a moth in the family Erebidae. It was described by Paul Dognin in 1907. It is found in French Guiana, Guyana, Venezuela and Bolivia.
