= Trichromia albicollis =

Scientific classification
- Kingdom: Animalia
- Phylum: Arthropoda
- Class: Insecta
- Order: Lepidoptera
- Superfamily: Noctuoidea
- Family: Erebidae
- Subfamily: Arctiinae
- Genus: Trichromia
- Species: T. albicollis

Binomial name
- Trichromia albicollis (Hampson, 1905)

Synonyms
- Neritos albicollis Hampson, 1905; Neritos hampsoni Rothschild, 1909

Species of moth

Trichromia albicollis, is a moth in the family Erebidae. It was described by George Hampson in 1905. It is found in French Guiana, Guyana and Bolivia.
