= Haemanota croceicauda =

Scientific classification
- Kingdom: Animalia
- Phylum: Arthropoda
- Class: Insecta
- Order: Lepidoptera
- Superfamily: Noctuoidea
- Family: Erebidae
- Subfamily: Arctiinae
- Genus: Haemanota
- Species: H. croceicauda

Binomial name
- Haemanota croceicauda (Toulgoët, 1987)

Synonyms
- Neritos croceicauda Toulgoët, 1987

Species of moth

Haemanota croceicauda is a moth of the family Erebidae first described by Hervé de Toulgoët in 1987. It is found in French Guiana and Bolivia.
