= Trichromia cybar =

Scientific classification
- Domain: Eukaryota
- Kingdom: Animalia
- Phylum: Arthropoda
- Class: Insecta
- Order: Lepidoptera
- Superfamily: Noctuoidea
- Family: Erebidae
- Subfamily: Arctiinae
- Genus: Trichromia
- Species: T. cybar

Binomial name
- Trichromia cybar (Schaus, 1924)

Synonyms
- Neritos cybar Schaus, 1924

Species of moth

Trichromia cybar is a moth in the family Erebidae. It was described by William Schaus in 1924. It is found in Argentina.
