= Trichromia unicolorata =

Scientific classification
- Kingdom: Animalia
- Phylum: Arthropoda
- Clade: Pancrustacea
- Class: Insecta
- Order: Lepidoptera
- Superfamily: Noctuoidea
- Family: Erebidae
- Subfamily: Arctiinae
- Genus: Trichromia
- Species: T. unicolorata

Binomial name
- Trichromia unicolorata (Gaede, 1928)

Synonyms
- Parevia unicolorata Gaede, 1928

Species of moth

Trichromia unicolorata is a species of moth in the subfamily Arctiinae. It is found in Brazil.
