= Trichromia vulmaria =

Scientific classification
- Kingdom: Animalia
- Phylum: Arthropoda
- Clade: Pancrustacea
- Class: Insecta
- Order: Lepidoptera
- Superfamily: Noctuoidea
- Family: Erebidae
- Subfamily: Arctiinae
- Genus: Trichromia
- Species: T. vulmaria

Binomial name
- Trichromia vulmaria (Schaus, 1924)

Synonyms
- Parevia vulmaria Schaus, 1924

Species of moth

Trichromia vulmaria is a species of moth in the subfamily Arctiinae that was first described by William Schaus in 1924. It is found in Brazil.
