= Haemanota rubriceps =

Scientific classification
- Domain: Eukaryota
- Kingdom: Animalia
- Phylum: Arthropoda
- Class: Insecta
- Order: Lepidoptera
- Superfamily: Noctuoidea
- Family: Erebidae
- Subfamily: Arctiinae
- Genus: Haemanota
- Species: H. rubriceps

Binomial name
- Haemanota rubriceps Hampson, 1901

Species of moth

Haemanota rubriceps is a moth of the family Erebidae. It was described by George Hampson in 1901. It is found in Brazil.
