= Trichromia curta =

Scientific classification
- Domain: Eukaryota
- Kingdom: Animalia
- Phylum: Arthropoda
- Class: Insecta
- Order: Lepidoptera
- Superfamily: Noctuoidea
- Family: Erebidae
- Subfamily: Arctiinae
- Genus: Trichromia
- Species: T. curta

Binomial name
- Trichromia curta (Rothschild, 1917)

Synonyms
- Hyponerita curta Rothschild, 1917; Neonerita curta

Species of moth

Trichromia curta is a moth of the family Erebidae. It was described by Walter Rothschild in 1917. It is found in French Guiana.
