= Trichromia repanda =

Scientific classification
- Kingdom: Animalia
- Phylum: Arthropoda
- Class: Insecta
- Order: Lepidoptera
- Superfamily: Noctuoidea
- Family: Erebidae
- Subfamily: Arctiinae
- Genus: Trichromia
- Species: T. repanda

Binomial name
- Trichromia repanda (Walker, 1855)

Synonyms
- Neritos repanda Walker, 1855; Antiloba carnea Weymer, 1895

Species of moth

Trichromia repanda is a moth in the family Erebidae. It was described by Francis Walker in 1855. It is found in French Guiana, Brazil, Amazonas, Venezuela, Ecuador, Peru and Bolivia.
