= Trichromia odorata =

Scientific classification
- Domain: Eukaryota
- Kingdom: Animalia
- Phylum: Arthropoda
- Class: Insecta
- Order: Lepidoptera
- Superfamily: Noctuoidea
- Family: Erebidae
- Subfamily: Arctiinae
- Genus: Trichromia
- Species: T. odorata

Binomial name
- Trichromia odorata (Rothschild, 1909)

Synonyms
- Paranerita odorata Rothschild, 1909

Species of moth

Trichromia odorata is a moth in the family Erebidae. It was described by Walter Rothschild in 1909. It is found in Brazil.
