= Haemanota sanguidorsia =

Scientific classification
- Domain: Eukaryota
- Kingdom: Animalia
- Phylum: Arthropoda
- Class: Insecta
- Order: Lepidoptera
- Superfamily: Noctuoidea
- Family: Erebidae
- Subfamily: Arctiinae
- Genus: Haemanota
- Species: H. sanguidorsia

Binomial name
- Haemanota sanguidorsia (Schaus, 1905)

Synonyms
- Neritos sanguidorsia Schaus, 1905; Haemanota cubana Rothschild, 1910

Species of moth

Haemanota sanguidorsia is a moth of the family Erebidae. It was described by William Schaus in 1905. It is found in French Guiana, Suriname, Guyana, Venezuela and on Cuba.
