= Trichromia complicata =

Scientific classification
- Domain: Eukaryota
- Kingdom: Animalia
- Phylum: Arthropoda
- Class: Insecta
- Order: Lepidoptera
- Superfamily: Noctuoidea
- Family: Erebidae
- Subfamily: Arctiinae
- Genus: Trichromia
- Species: T. complicata

Binomial name
- Trichromia complicata (Schaus, 1905)

Synonyms
- Paranerita complicata Schaus, 1905; Paranerita plagosa Rothschild, 1917

Species of moth

Trichromia complicata is a moth in the family Erebidae. It was described by William Schaus in 1905. It is found in French Guiana.
