= Hyponerita tipolis =

Scientific classification
- Domain: Eukaryota
- Kingdom: Animalia
- Phylum: Arthropoda
- Class: Insecta
- Order: Lepidoptera
- Superfamily: Noctuoidea
- Family: Erebidae
- Subfamily: Arctiinae
- Genus: Hyponerita
- Species: H. tipolis

Binomial name
- Hyponerita tipolis (H. Druce, 1896)

Synonyms
- Neritos tipolis H. Druce, 1896; Hyponerita borealis Rothschild, 1909

Species of moth

Hyponerita tipolis is a moth of the subfamily Arctiinae. It was described by Herbert Druce in 1896. It is found in Guatemala.
