= Trichromia polyxena =

Scientific classification
- Kingdom: Animalia
- Phylum: Arthropoda
- Clade: Pancrustacea
- Class: Insecta
- Order: Lepidoptera
- Superfamily: Noctuoidea
- Family: Erebidae
- Subfamily: Arctiinae
- Genus: Trichromia
- Species: T. polyxena

Binomial name
- Trichromia polyxena (H. Druce, 1883)

Synonyms
- Evius polyxenus H. Druce, 1883; Hyponerita garleppi Rothschild, 1909; Paranerita bolivica Strand, 1919; Paranerita polyxena (H. Druce, 1883)

Species of moth

Trichromia polyxena is a species of moth in the subfamily Arctiinae. It was first described by Herbert Druce in 1883. It is found in Peru, Ecuador and Bolivia.

== Subspecies ==
- Paranerita polyxena polyxena (Peru, Ecuador)
- Paranerita polyxena bolivica Strand, 1919 (Bolivia)
