= Trichromia cinerea =

Scientific classification
- Kingdom: Animalia
- Phylum: Arthropoda
- Clade: Pancrustacea
- Class: Insecta
- Order: Lepidoptera
- Superfamily: Noctuoidea
- Family: Erebidae
- Subfamily: Arctiinae
- Genus: Trichromia
- Species: T. cinerea

Binomial name
- Trichromia cinerea (Rothschild, 1913)

Synonyms
- Diarhabdosia cinerea Rothschild, 1913; Parevia cinerea (Rothschild, 1913)

Species of moth

Trichromia cinerea is a species of moth in the subfamily Arctiinae that was first described in 1913 by Walter Rothschild. It is found in Brazil.
