= Haemanota kindliana =

Scientific classification
- Kingdom: Animalia
- Phylum: Arthropoda
- Class: Insecta
- Order: Lepidoptera
- Superfamily: Noctuoidea
- Family: Erebidae
- Subfamily: Arctiinae
- Genus: Haemanota
- Species: H. kindliana

Binomial name
- Haemanota kindliana Toulgoët, 2001

Species of moth

Haemanota kindliana is a moth of the family Erebidae. It is found in French Guiana.
