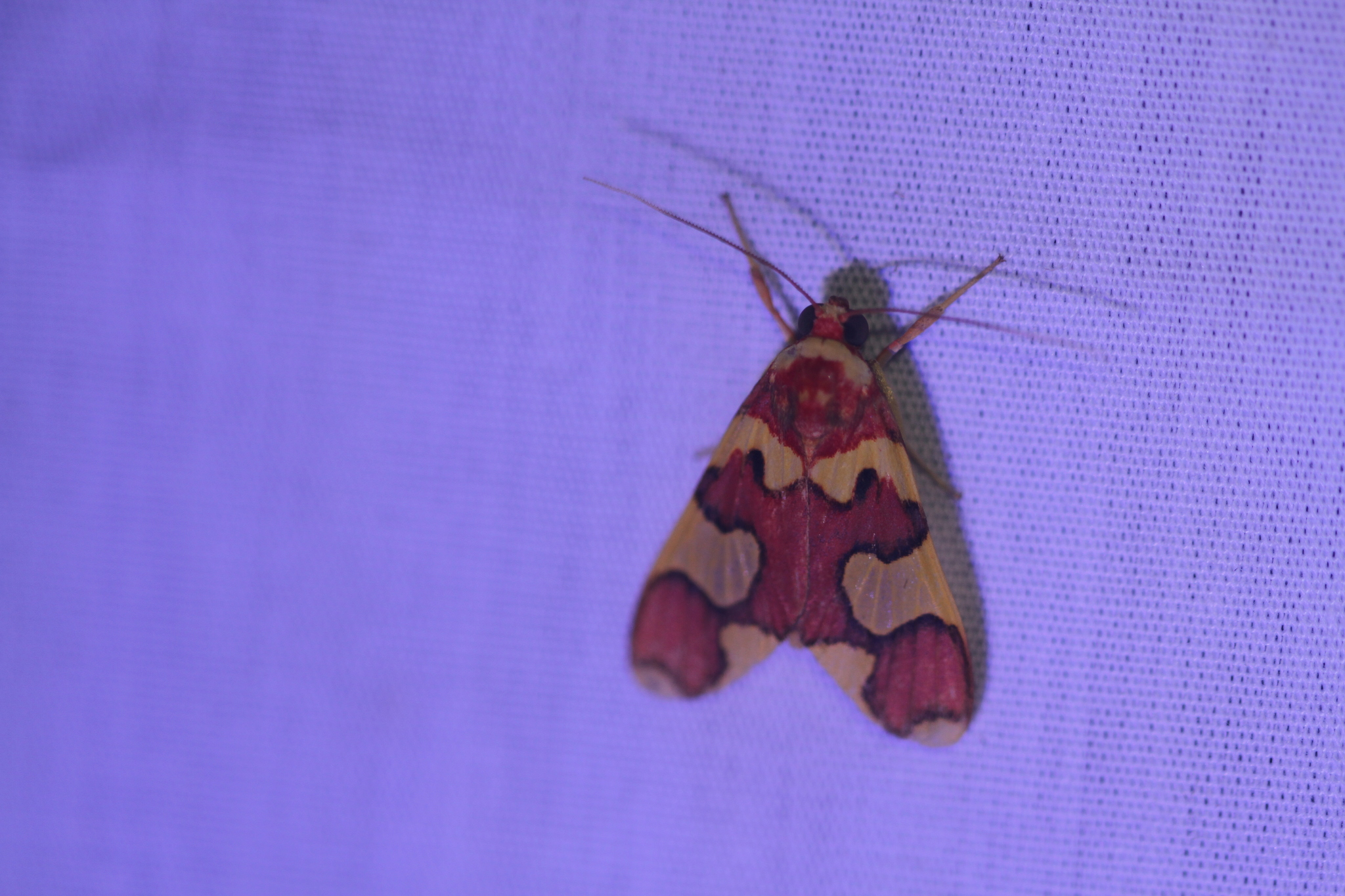

Scientific classification
- Kingdom: Animalia
- Phylum: Arthropoda
- Clade: Pancrustacea
- Class: Insecta
- Order: Lepidoptera
- Superfamily: Noctuoidea
- Family: Erebidae
- Subfamily: Arctiinae
- Genus: Trichromia
- Species: T. supracoccinea

Binomial name
- Trichromia supracoccinea Vincent & Laguerre, 2017

= Trichromia supracoccinea =

Species of moth

Trichromia supracoccinea is a species of moth from in the family Erebidae. The species was first described by Benoît Vincent and Michel Laguerre in 2017.

== Description ==
Trichromia supracoccinea is a 20 tot 30 mm long moth, which is endemic to French Guiana.

== Range ==
The species has recently been described. Observations are sparse. The holotype and paratype were collected in French Guiana.
