= Trichromia leucoplaga =

Scientific classification
- Kingdom: Animalia
- Phylum: Arthropoda
- Class: Insecta
- Order: Lepidoptera
- Superfamily: Noctuoidea
- Family: Erebidae
- Subfamily: Arctiinae
- Genus: Trichromia
- Species: T. leucoplaga

Binomial name
- Trichromia leucoplaga (Hampson, 1905)

Synonyms
- Neritos leucoplaga Hampson, 1905

Species of moth

Trichromia leucoplaga is a moth in the family Erebidae. It was described by George Hampson in 1905. It is found in French Guiana and Peru.
