= Hyponerita rhodocraspis =

Scientific classification
- Kingdom: Animalia
- Phylum: Arthropoda
- Class: Insecta
- Order: Lepidoptera
- Superfamily: Noctuoidea
- Family: Erebidae
- Subfamily: Arctiinae
- Genus: Hyponerita
- Species: H. rhodocraspis

Binomial name
- Hyponerita rhodocraspis Hampson, 1909

Synonyms
- Hyponerita rhodocraspis f. impunctata Gaede, 1928

Species of moth

Hyponerita rhodocraspis is a moth of the subfamily Arctiinae. It was described by George Hampson in 1909. It is found in Peru.
