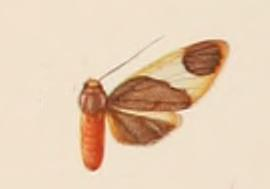
- Trichromia sithnides lavendulae

Scientific classification
- Domain: Eukaryota
- Kingdom: Animalia
- Phylum: Arthropoda
- Class: Insecta
- Order: Lepidoptera
- Superfamily: Noctuoidea
- Family: Erebidae
- Subfamily: Arctiinae
- Genus: Trichromia
- Species: T. sithnides

Binomial name
- Trichromia sithnides (H. Druce, 1896)

Synonyms
- Neritos sithnides H. Druce, 1896; Paranerita sithnides; Neritos lavendulae Rothschild, 1909; Neritos meridionalis Rothschild, 1909; Paranerita disjuncta Talbot, 1928

= Trichromia sithnides =

Species of moth

Trichromia sithnides is a moth of the family Erebidae first described by Herbert Druce in 1896. It is found in Brazil, Suriname, Peru and French Guiana.

== Subspecies ==
- Trichromia sithnides sithnides (Peru)
- Trichromia sithnides lavendulae (Rothschild, 1909) (Brazil, Suriname, Peru)
- Trichromia sithnides meridionalis (Rothschild, 1909) (Brazil)
- Trichromia sithnides disjuncta (Talbot, 1928) (Brazil)
