= Trichromia interna =

Scientific classification
- Domain: Eukaryota
- Kingdom: Animalia
- Phylum: Arthropoda
- Class: Insecta
- Order: Lepidoptera
- Superfamily: Noctuoidea
- Family: Erebidae
- Subfamily: Arctiinae
- Genus: Trichromia
- Species: T. interna

Binomial name
- Trichromia interna (Schaus, 1905)

Synonyms
- Hyponerita interna Schaus, 1905

Species of moth

Trichromia interna is a moth in the family Erebidae. It was described by William Schaus in 1905. It is found in French Guiana.
