= Pseudepimolis ridenda =

Scientific classification
- Domain: Eukaryota
- Kingdom: Animalia
- Phylum: Arthropoda
- Class: Insecta
- Order: Lepidoptera
- Superfamily: Noctuoidea
- Family: Erebidae
- Subfamily: Arctiinae
- Genus: Pseudepimolis
- Species: P. ridenda

Binomial name
- Pseudepimolis ridenda (Dognin, 1911)

Synonyms
- Idalus ridenda Dognin, 1911; Demolis ridenda

Species of moth

Pseudepimolis ridenda is a moth of the family Erebidae first described by Paul Dognin in 1911. It is found in French Guiana and Brazil.
