= Haemanota vicinula =

Scientific classification
- Kingdom: Animalia
- Phylum: Arthropoda
- Class: Insecta
- Order: Lepidoptera
- Superfamily: Noctuoidea
- Family: Erebidae
- Subfamily: Arctiinae
- Genus: Haemanota
- Species: H. vicinula

Binomial name
- Haemanota vicinula Toulgoët, 1997

Species of moth

Haemanota vicinula is a moth of the family Erebidae. It was described by Hervé de Toulgoët in 1997. It is found in French Guiana.
