= Haemanota prophaea =

Scientific classification
- Domain: Eukaryota
- Kingdom: Animalia
- Phylum: Arthropoda
- Class: Insecta
- Order: Lepidoptera
- Superfamily: Noctuoidea
- Family: Erebidae
- Subfamily: Arctiinae
- Genus: Haemanota
- Species: H. prophaea

Binomial name
- Haemanota prophaea (Schaus, 1905)

Synonyms
- Neritos prophaea Schaus, 1905; Trichromia prophaea

Species of moth

Haemanota prophaea is a moth of the family Erebidae. It was described by William Schaus in 1905. It is found from French Guiana in South America to Arizona in the southern United States.
