= Pseudepimolis =

Scientific classification
- Domain: Eukaryota
- Kingdom: Animalia
- Phylum: Arthropoda
- Class: Insecta
- Order: Lepidoptera
- Superfamily: Noctuoidea
- Family: Erebidae
- Subfamily: Arctiinae
- Subtribe: Phaegopterina
- Genus: Pseudepimolis; Vincent & Laguerre, 2013

Type species
- Idalus marpessa Druce, 1906

Genus of moths

Pseudepimolis is a genus of moths in the family Erebidae. It was erected by Benoît Vincent and Michel Laguerre in 2013.

== Species ==
- Pseudepimolis apiciplaga (Rothschild, 1909)
- Pseudepimolis haemasticta (Dognin, 1906)
- Pseudepimolis incisa (Rothschild, 1909)
- Pseudepimolis marpessa (Druce, 1906)
- Pseudepimolis rhyssa (Druce, 1906)
- Pseudepimolis ridenda (Dognin, 1911)
