= Trichromia peninsulata =

Scientific classification
- Kingdom: Animalia
- Phylum: Arthropoda
- Clade: Pancrustacea
- Class: Insecta
- Order: Lepidoptera
- Superfamily: Noctuoidea
- Family: Erebidae
- Subfamily: Arctiinae
- Genus: Trichromia
- Species: T. peninsulata

Binomial name
- Trichromia peninsulata (Dognin, 1914)

Synonyms
- Paranerita peninsulata Dognin, 1914

Species of moth

Trichromia peninsulata is a species of moth in the subfamily Arctiinae. It was first described by Paul Dognin in 1914. It is found in Venezuela.
