= Trichromia flavomarginata =

Scientific classification
- Domain: Eukaryota
- Kingdom: Animalia
- Phylum: Arthropoda
- Class: Insecta
- Order: Lepidoptera
- Superfamily: Noctuoidea
- Family: Erebidae
- Subfamily: Arctiinae
- Genus: Trichromia
- Species: T. flavomarginata

Binomial name
- Trichromia flavomarginata (Rothschild, 1910)

Synonyms
- Automolis flavomarginata Rothschild, 1910

Species of moth

Trichromia flavomarginata is a moth in the family Erebidae. It was described by Walter Rothschild in 1910. It is found in Brazil.
