= Trichromia samos =

Scientific classification
- Domain: Eukaryota
- Kingdom: Animalia
- Phylum: Arthropoda
- Class: Insecta
- Order: Lepidoptera
- Superfamily: Noctuoidea
- Family: Erebidae
- Subfamily: Arctiinae
- Genus: Trichromia
- Species: T. samos

Binomial name
- Trichromia samos (H. Druce, 1896)

Synonyms
- Neritos samos H. Druce, 1896

Species of moth

Trichromia samos is a moth in the family Erebidae. It was described by Herbert Druce in 1896. It is found in Belize and Honduras.
