= Trichromia metaphoenica =

Scientific classification
- Domain: Eukaryota
- Kingdom: Animalia
- Phylum: Arthropoda
- Class: Insecta
- Order: Lepidoptera
- Superfamily: Noctuoidea
- Family: Erebidae
- Subfamily: Arctiinae
- Genus: Trichromia
- Species: T. metaphoenica

Binomial name
- Trichromia metaphoenica (Joicey & Talbot, 1917)

Species of moth

Trichromia metaphoenica is a moth of the family Erebidae. It was described by James John Joicey and George Talbot in 1917. It is found in French Guiana.
