= Haemanota nigricollum =

Scientific classification
- Kingdom: Animalia
- Phylum: Arthropoda
- Clade: Pancrustacea
- Class: Insecta
- Order: Lepidoptera
- Superfamily: Noctuoidea
- Family: Erebidae
- Subfamily: Arctiinae
- Genus: Haemanota
- Species: H. nigricollum

Binomial name
- Haemanota nigricollum (Dognin, 1892)

Synonyms
- Scepsis nigricollum Dognin, 1892; Trichromia nigricollum

Species of moth

Haemanota nigricollum is a moth of the family Erebidae. It is found in Ecuador.
