= Trichromia postsuffusa =

Scientific classification
- Domain: Eukaryota
- Kingdom: Animalia
- Phylum: Arthropoda
- Class: Insecta
- Order: Lepidoptera
- Superfamily: Noctuoidea
- Family: Erebidae
- Subfamily: Arctiinae
- Genus: Trichromia
- Species: T. postsuffusa

Binomial name
- Trichromia postsuffusa (Rothschild, 1922)

Synonyms
- Neonerita postsuffusa (Rothschild, 1922); Schalotomis postsuffusa Rothschild, 1922; Schalotomis pallida Rothschild, 1922

Species of moth

Trichromia postsuffusa is a moth of the family Erebidae. It was described by Walter Rothschild in 1922. It is found in Guyana and Brazil.

== Subspecies ==
- Trichromia postsuffusa postsuffusa (Guyana)
- Trichromia postsuffusa pallida (Rothschild, 1922) (Brazil: Para)
