= Haemanota chrysozona =

Scientific classification
- Domain: Eukaryota
- Kingdom: Animalia
- Phylum: Arthropoda
- Class: Insecta
- Order: Lepidoptera
- Superfamily: Noctuoidea
- Family: Erebidae
- Subfamily: Arctiinae
- Genus: Haemanota
- Species: H. chrysozona

Binomial name
- Haemanota chrysozona (Schaus, 1905)

Synonyms
- Neritos chrysozona Schaus, 1905; Trichromia chrysozona

Species of moth

Haemanota chrysozona is a moth of the family Erebidae. It is found in French Guiana.
