= Pseudepimolis apiciplaga =

Scientific classification
- Domain: Eukaryota
- Kingdom: Animalia
- Phylum: Arthropoda
- Class: Insecta
- Order: Lepidoptera
- Superfamily: Noctuoidea
- Family: Erebidae
- Subfamily: Arctiinae
- Genus: Pseudepimolis
- Species: P. apiciplaga

Binomial name
- Pseudepimolis apiciplaga (Rothschild, 1909)

Synonyms
- Automolis apiciplaga Rothschild, 1909

Species of moth

Pseudepimolis apiciplaga is a moth in the family Erebidae. It was described by Walter Rothschild in 1909. It is found in Brazil.
