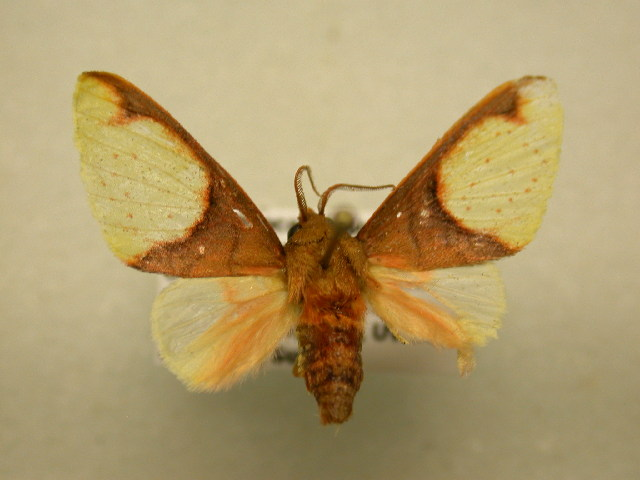

Scientific classification
- Domain: Eukaryota
- Kingdom: Animalia
- Phylum: Arthropoda
- Class: Insecta
- Order: Lepidoptera
- Superfamily: Noctuoidea
- Family: Erebidae
- Subfamily: Arctiinae
- Genus: Pseudepimolis
- Species: P. incisa

Binomial name
- Pseudepimolis incisa (Rothschild, 1909)

Synonyms
- Aphyle intorta Schaus, 1910; Epimolis incisa (Rothschild, 1909); Neonerita intorta (Schaus, 1910); Prumala incisa Rothschild, 1909

= Pseudepimolis incisa =

Species of moth

Pseudepimolis incisa is a moth of the family Erebidae. It was described by Walter Rothschild in 1909. It is found in Costa Rica, French Guiana, Brazil, the upper Amazon region, Venezuela and Bolivia.
