= Haemanota syntomoides =

Scientific classification
- Domain: Eukaryota
- Kingdom: Animalia
- Phylum: Arthropoda
- Class: Insecta
- Order: Lepidoptera
- Superfamily: Noctuoidea
- Family: Erebidae
- Subfamily: Arctiinae
- Genus: Haemanota
- Species: H. syntomoides

Binomial name
- Haemanota syntomoides (Rothschild, 1910)

Synonyms
- Neritos syntomoides Rothschild, 1910; Trichromia syntomoides

Species of moth

Haemanota syntomoides is a moth of the family Erebidae. It is found in Suriname.
