= Pseudepimolis haemasticta =

Scientific classification
- Kingdom: Animalia
- Phylum: Arthropoda
- Clade: Pancrustacea
- Class: Insecta
- Order: Lepidoptera
- Superfamily: Noctuoidea
- Family: Erebidae
- Subfamily: Arctiinae
- Genus: Pseudepimolis
- Species: P. haemasticta

Binomial name
- Pseudepimolis haemasticta (Dognin, 1906)

Synonyms
- Neonerita haemasticta Dognin, 1906; Neonerita haematosticta Rothschild, 1910; Neonerita haemasticta parvimacula Rothschild, 1910

Species of moth

Pseudepimolis haemasticta is a moth of the family Erebidae. It was described by Paul Dognin in 1906. It is found in Peru.
