= Hyponerita hamoia =

Scientific classification
- Domain: Eukaryota
- Kingdom: Animalia
- Phylum: Arthropoda
- Class: Insecta
- Order: Lepidoptera
- Superfamily: Noctuoidea
- Family: Erebidae
- Subfamily: Arctiinae
- Genus: Hyponerita
- Species: H. hamoia

Binomial name
- Hyponerita hamoia Joicey & Talbot, 1916

Synonyms
- Trichromia hamoia (Joicey & Talbot, 1916)

Species of moth

Hyponerita hamoia is a moth of the subfamily Arctiinae. It was described by James John Joicey and George Talbot in 1916. It is found in Colombia.
