= Scopula rubrosignaria =

Scientific classification
- Kingdom: Animalia
- Phylum: Arthropoda
- Clade: Pancrustacea
- Class: Insecta
- Order: Lepidoptera
- Family: Geometridae
- Genus: Scopula
- Species: S. rubrosignaria

Binomial name
- Scopula rubrosignaria (Mabille, 1900)

Synonyms
- Acidalia rubrosignaria Mabille, 1900

Species of geometer moth in subfamily Sterrhinae

Scopula rubrosignaria is a moth of the family Geometridae. It is found in Madagascar.

== Subspecies ==
- Scopula rubrosignaria rubrosignaria
- Scopula rubrosignaria sanguinolenta Herbulot, 1972
