= Pyrausta venilialis =

Scientific classification
- Domain: Eukaryota
- Kingdom: Animalia
- Phylum: Arthropoda
- Class: Insecta
- Order: Lepidoptera
- Family: Crambidae
- Genus: Pyrausta
- Species: P. venilialis

Binomial name
- Pyrausta venilialis (Mabille, 1880)

Synonyms
- Botys venilialis Mabille, 1880

Species of moth

Pyrausta venilialis is a moth in the family Crambidae. It was described by Paul Mabille in 1880. It is found on Madagascar.
