= Eilema flammea =

Scientific classification
- Domain: Eukaryota
- Kingdom: Animalia
- Phylum: Arthropoda
- Class: Insecta
- Order: Lepidoptera
- Superfamily: Noctuoidea
- Family: Erebidae
- Subfamily: Arctiinae
- Genus: Eilema
- Species: E. flammea

Binomial name
- Eilema flammea (Mabille, 1885)

Synonyms
- Lithosia flammea Mabille, 1885

Species of moth

Eilema flammea is a moth of the subfamily Arctiinae. It was described by Paul Mabille in 1885. It is found on Madagascar.
