= Scoparia biradiellus =

Scientific classification
- Kingdom: Animalia
- Phylum: Arthropoda
- Class: Insecta
- Order: Lepidoptera
- Family: Crambidae
- Genus: Scoparia
- Species: S. biradiellus

Binomial name
- Scoparia biradiellus (Mabille, 1885)

Synonyms
- Crambus biradiellus Mabille, 1885; Scoparia chordactis Meyrick, 1887

Species of moth

Scoparia biradiellus is a moth in the family Crambidae. It was described by Paul Mabille in 1885. It is found in Chile.

The wingspan is 24–25 mm. The forewings are violet light grey.
