= Scopula terrearia =

Scientific classification
- Kingdom: Animalia
- Phylum: Arthropoda
- Class: Insecta
- Order: Lepidoptera
- Family: Geometridae
- Genus: Scopula
- Species: S. terrearia

Binomial name
- Scopula terrearia (Mabille, 1900)

Synonyms
- Acidalia terrearia Mabille, 1900; Scopula empera Prout, 1928

Species of geometer moth in subfamily Sterrhinae

Scopula terrearia is a moth of the family Geometridae. It was described by Paul Mabille in 1900. It is endemic to Madagascar.
