= Eugène Boullet =

French naturalist, entomologist and collector

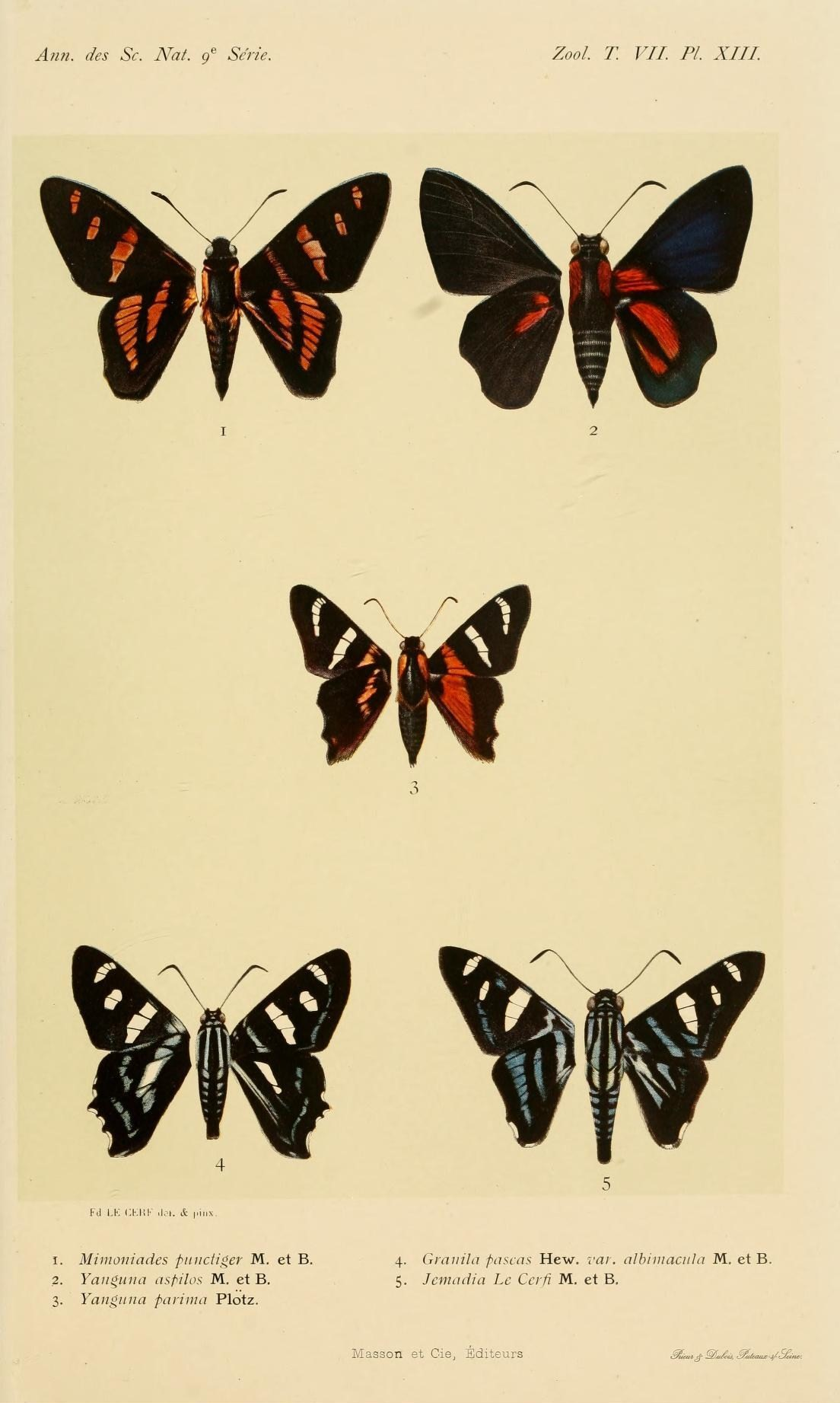
Plate from Essai de révision de la famille des hespérides 1908

Eugène Anatole Auguste Victor Boullet (1 July 1847, in Acheux – 1923) was a French naturalist, entomologist and collector.

With Jules Paul Mabille he described many new species of Neotropical Hesperiidae. He also wrote Catalogue de la collection de Lépidoptères du Muséum national d'histoire naturelle de Paris. I, Famille Papilionidae (1921) in collaboration with Ferdinand Le Cerf. He was a wealthy banker in Corbie.

The collaboration with Le Cerf an entomologist at Muséum national d'histoire naturelle began in 1905.

"Around 1905, a man who did much for the Museum and was one of its first "associates", M. E. Boullet, banker at Corbie, decided to give to our institution his collection of Lepidoptera, offering in addition to helping with its inclusion in ours. Which one to choose? There was no competition. The Hesperidae, family for which there was, in Paris, a specialist in that order Mabille.

With the approval of M. Bouvier, we sat down to agree on a work plan. Classification, or more accurately, the establishment of the collection was taken up at the beginning, with the Papilionidae, and has continued since then as methodically as resources and materials of the service allow.

Mr. Boullet was paying a technician, charged exclusively with the preparation of butterflies; every month, I sent to Corbie a stock of specimens of the family being classified. These were returned me or reported on during the two or three days that he spent each month in Paris during which time we worked together."

The totality of Boullet's world insect collection (25,000 Lepidoptera notably rich in specialist collections of Neotropical Hesperiidae and Papilionidae; Heliconiinae and Satyridae and containing many rare and expensive Morpho, Agrias and Ornithoptera) was given, on his death and with a sum of money for its maintenance to Muséum national d'histoire naturelle in Paris where it is now held. The same museum holds his extensive collections of Coleoptera Diptera and Hymenoptera.

Boullet travelled widely in Europe and north Africa taking stereo-photographs of archaeological sites. In Corbie he maintained an orchidarium containing 4,000 species, cultivars and hybrids and a glasshouse for Nymphaeaceae including especially Victoria lilies. He also had a large and noted stamp collection (39,000 items).

Eugène Boullet was a Member of Société entomologique de France.

== Works ==
Partial list

with La Cerf

- Boullet, E. and Le Cerf, F. L. (1912): Catalogue de la collection de lépidoptères du Muséum national d'Histoire naturelle de Paris. I. Famille Papilionidae, Imprimérie Nationale, Paris pdf
- Boullet, Eugène and Le Cerf, Ferdinand (1912) Descriptions sommaires de formes nouvelles de Papilionidae (Lep.).Bulletin de la Société entomologique de France 1912(6), pp. [141-143]
- Boullet, Eugène and Le Cerf, Ferdinand (1912): Descriptions sommaires de formes nouvelles de Papilionidae (Lep.). de la collection du Muséum de Paris (2e note)Bulletin de la Société entomologique de France 1912(11), pp. [246-247]
- Boullet, E. (1913): Description d'une forme femelle de Baronia brevicornis Godm. et Salv. (Lep. Papilionidae) Bulletin de la Société entomologique de France 1913(3), pp. [99-101, 2 figs.]

with Mabille

- 1908 Essai de révision de la famille des hespérides. Annales des Sciences naturelles (Zoologie) (9)7(4/6): 167 207, pls. 13 14
- 1912 Essai de révision de la famille des hespérides. Annales des Sciences naturelles (Zoologie) (9)16(1/4): 1 159, 2 pls.
- 1916 Description d'hespérides nouveaux (Lep. Hesperiinae, Sect. B). Bulletin de la Société entomologique de France 1916(15): 243 247
- 1917 Description d'hespérides nouveaux (Lep. Hesperiinae, Sect. B). Bulletin de la Société entomologique de France 1916(20): 320 325
- 1917 Description d'hespérides nouveaux (Lep.). Bulletin de la Société entomologique de France 1917(1): 54 60
- 1917 Description d'hespérides nouveaux (Lep. Hesperiinae, Sect. B). Bulletin de la Société entomologique de France 1917(4): 97 101
- 1919 Essai de révision de la famille des hespérides. Annales des Sciences naturelles (Zoologie) (10)2(4/6): 199 258

== See also ==
The wealthy and passionate butterfly collectors James John Joicey, Walter Rothschild and in France Georges Rousseau-Decelle, François-Charles Oberthür and his sons René Oberthür and Charles Oberthür, and Aimée Fournier de Horrack.
