= Egnasia macularia =

Scientific classification
- Domain: Eukaryota
- Kingdom: Animalia
- Phylum: Arthropoda
- Class: Insecta
- Order: Lepidoptera
- Superfamily: Noctuoidea
- Family: Erebidae
- Genus: Egnasia
- Species: E. macularia

Binomial name
- Egnasia macularia Mabille, 1900

Species of moth

Egnasia macularia is a species of moth of the family Noctuidae. It was described by Paul Mabille in 1900. It is endemic to Madagascar.

It has a wingspan of 32 millimetres (1.3 in).
