= Eupithecia semilotaria =

Scientific classification
- Kingdom: Animalia
- Phylum: Arthropoda
- Class: Insecta
- Order: Lepidoptera
- Family: Geometridae
- Genus: Eupithecia
- Species: E. semilotaria

Binomial name
- Eupithecia semilotaria (Mabille, 1885)

Synonyms
- Larentia semilotaria Mabille, 1885

Species of moth

Eupithecia semilotaria is a moth in the family Geometridae. It is found in southern Chile.

The length of the forewings is about 10.5 mm for males. Adults have been recorded on wing in March.
