= Trichura fulvicaudata =

Scientific classification
- Domain: Eukaryota
- Kingdom: Animalia
- Phylum: Arthropoda
- Class: Insecta
- Order: Lepidoptera
- Superfamily: Noctuoidea
- Family: Erebidae
- Subfamily: Arctiinae
- Genus: Trichura
- Species: T. fulvicaudata

Binomial name
- Trichura fulvicaudata Lathy, 1899

Species of moth

Trichura fulvicaudata is a moth in the subfamily Arctiinae. It was described by Percy Ireland Lathy in 1899. It is found in Paraguay.
