= Tsarafidynia perpusilla =

Scientific classification
- Domain: Eukaryota
- Kingdom: Animalia
- Phylum: Arthropoda
- Class: Insecta
- Order: Lepidoptera
- Superfamily: Noctuoidea
- Family: Erebidae
- Subfamily: Arctiinae
- Genus: Tsarafidynia
- Species: T. perpusilla

Binomial name
- Tsarafidynia perpusilla (Mabille, 1880)

Synonyms
- Aglaope perpusilla Mabille, 1880; Tsarafidynia bicolor Rothschild, 1911

Species of moth

Tsarafidynia perpusilla is a moth in the subfamily Arctiinae. It was described by Paul Mabille in 1880. It is found on Madagascar.
