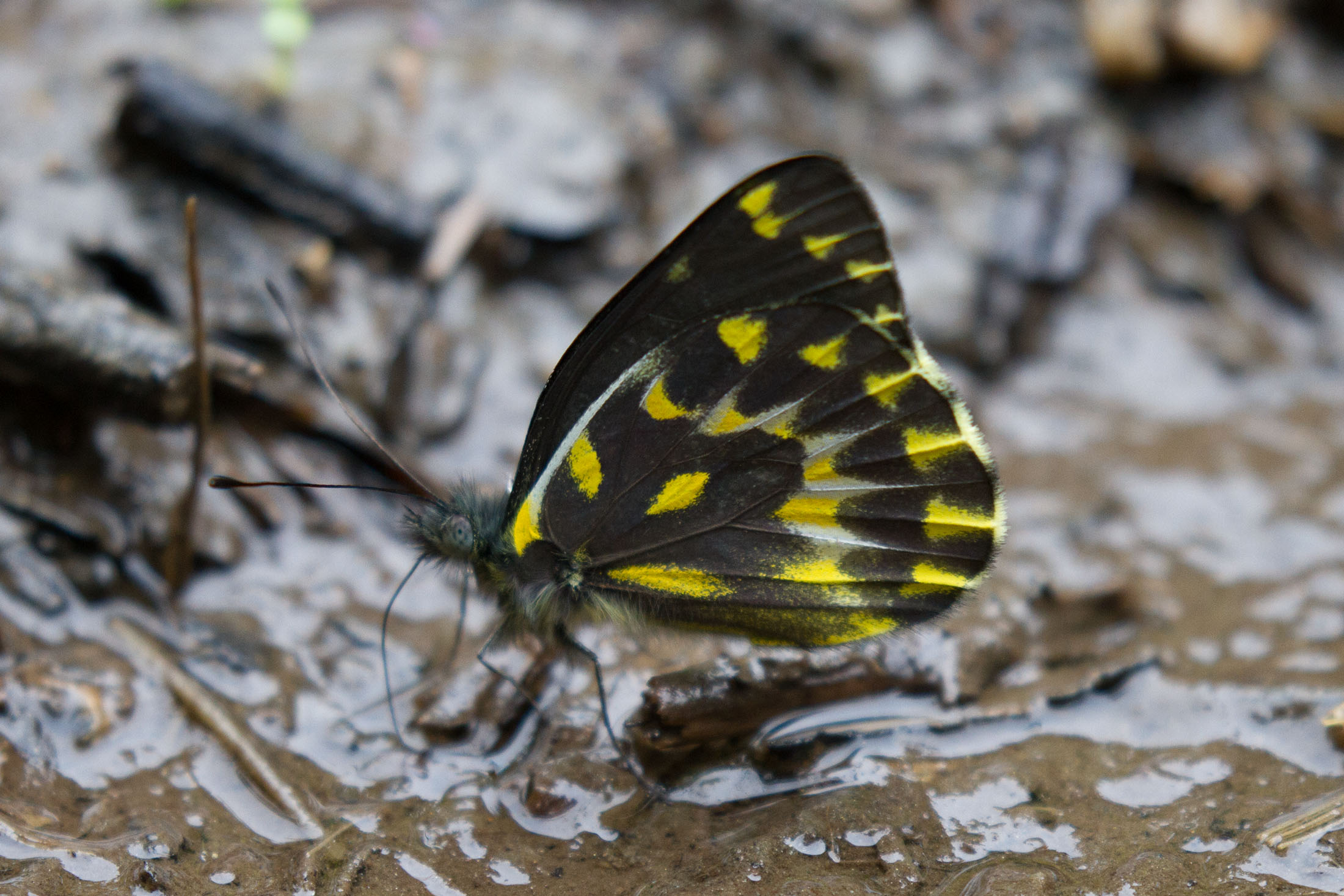

Scientific classification
- Kingdom: Animalia
- Phylum: Arthropoda
- Class: Insecta
- Order: Lepidoptera
- Family: Pieridae
- Genus: Delias
- Species: D. kenricki

Binomial name
- Delias kenricki Talbot, 1937

Synonyms
- Delias kenricki f. fuliginosus Kenrick, 1909; Delias kenricki f. ochraceus Joicey & Noakes 1915

= Delias kenricki =

Species of butterfly

Delias kenricki is a butterfly in the family Pieridae. It was described by George Talbot in 1937. It is found in New Guinea (Arfak Mountains).It is distinguishable by the dark colouring over the entire upperside, very plain in the male.

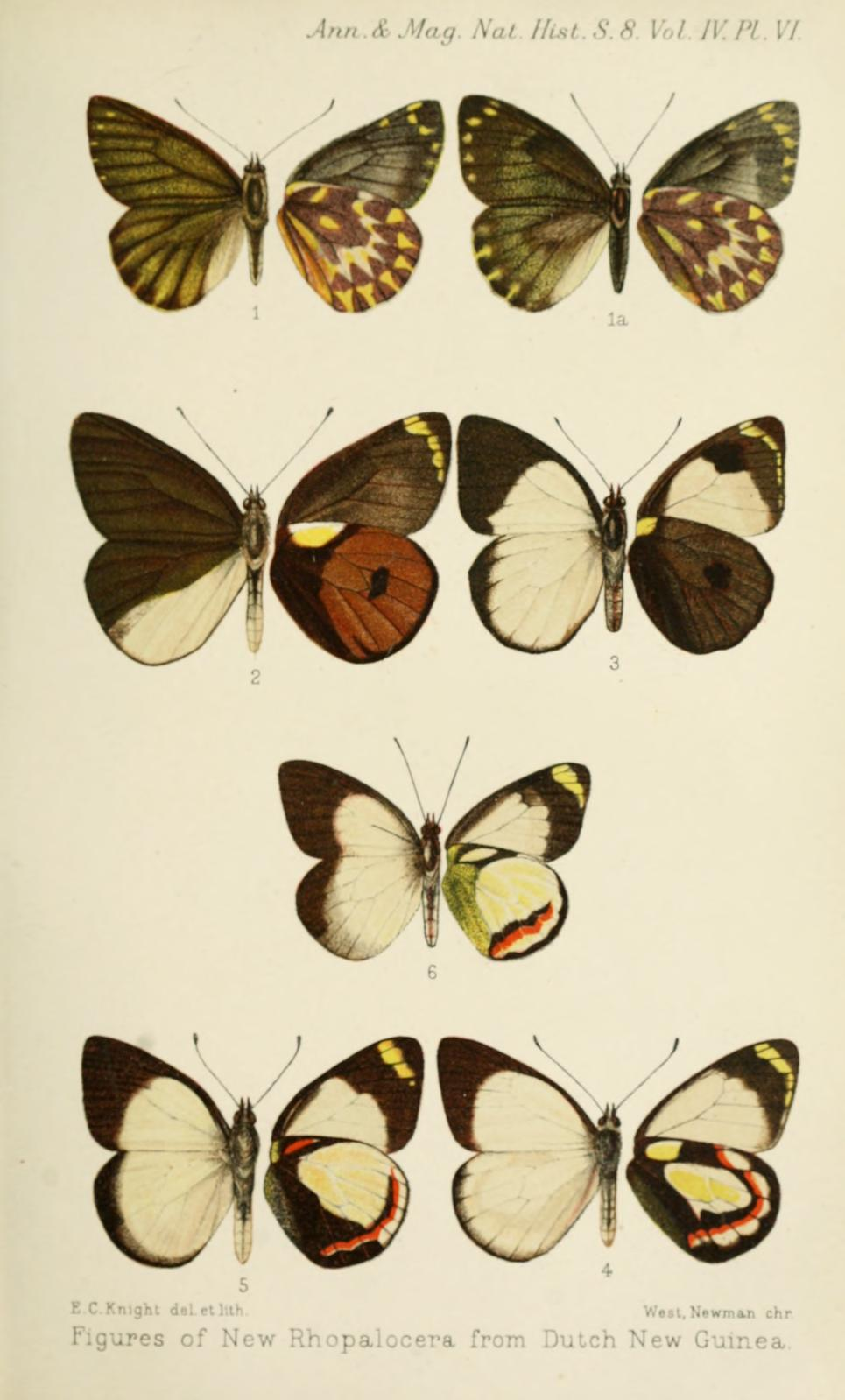
1, 1a as fuliginosus

The name honours George Hamilton Kenrick.
