= Eilema umbrigera =

Scientific classification
- Domain: Eukaryota
- Kingdom: Animalia
- Phylum: Arthropoda
- Class: Insecta
- Order: Lepidoptera
- Superfamily: Noctuoidea
- Family: Erebidae
- Subfamily: Arctiinae
- Genus: Eilema
- Species: E. umbrigera

Binomial name
- Eilema umbrigera (Mabille, 1900)

Synonyms
- Lithosia umbrigera Mabille, 1900

Species of moth

Eilema umbrigera is a moth of the subfamily Arctiinae. It was described by Paul Mabille in 1900. It is found on Madagascar.
