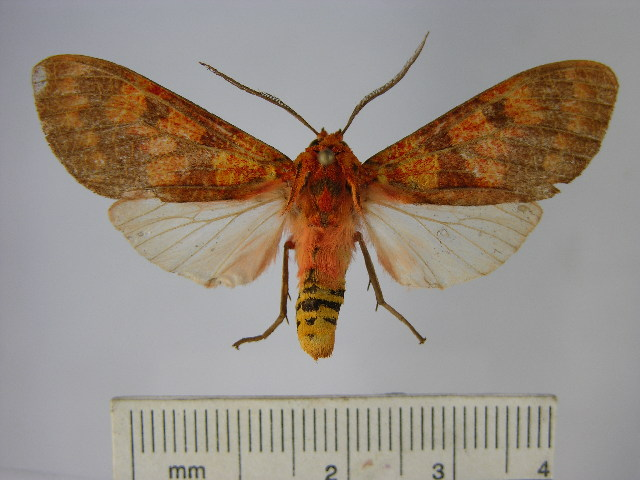

Scientific classification
- Domain: Eukaryota
- Kingdom: Animalia
- Phylum: Arthropoda
- Class: Insecta
- Order: Lepidoptera
- Superfamily: Noctuoidea
- Family: Erebidae
- Subfamily: Arctiinae
- Genus: Mazaeras
- Species: M. mediofasciata

Binomial name
- Mazaeras mediofasciata (Joicey & Talbot, 1916)

Synonyms
- Elysius mediofasciata Joicey & Talbot, 1916

= Mazaeras mediofasciata =

Species of moth

Mazaeras mediofasciata is a moth of the family Erebidae first described by James John Joicey and George Talbot in 1916. It is found in Peru.
