= Metastatia azurea =

Scientific classification
- Domain: Eukaryota
- Kingdom: Animalia
- Phylum: Arthropoda
- Class: Insecta
- Order: Lepidoptera
- Superfamily: Noctuoidea
- Family: Erebidae
- Subfamily: Arctiinae
- Genus: Metastatia
- Species: M. azurea

Binomial name
- Metastatia azurea Lathy, 1899

Synonyms
- Metastatia rubroanalis Rothschild

Species of moth

Metastatia azurea is a moth of the subfamily Arctiinae. It was described by Percy Ireland Lathy in 1899. It is found in Ecuador.
