= Trichura cyanea =

Scientific classification
- Domain: Eukaryota
- Kingdom: Animalia
- Phylum: Arthropoda
- Class: Insecta
- Order: Lepidoptera
- Superfamily: Noctuoidea
- Family: Erebidae
- Subfamily: Arctiinae
- Genus: Trichura
- Species: T. cyanea

Binomial name
- Trichura cyanea Schaus, 1872

Species of moth

Trichura cyanea is a moth in the subfamily Arctiinae. It was described by William Schaus in 1872. It is found in Rio de Janeiro, Brazil.
