= Mazaeras conferta =

Scientific classification
- Kingdom: Animalia
- Phylum: Arthropoda
- Clade: Pancrustacea
- Class: Insecta
- Order: Lepidoptera
- Superfamily: Noctuoidea
- Family: Erebidae
- Subfamily: Arctiinae
- Genus: Mazaeras
- Species: M. conferta

Binomial name
- Mazaeras conferta Walker, 1855

Species of moth

Mazaeras conferta is a moth of the family Erebidae. It was described by Francis Walker in 1855. It is found in Espírito Santo, Brazil.
