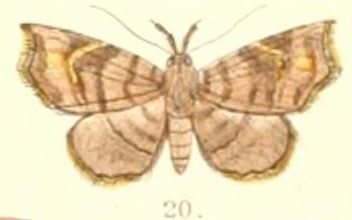
- Egnasia fasciata

Scientific classification
- Kingdom: Animalia
- Phylum: Arthropoda
- Class: Insecta
- Order: Lepidoptera
- Superfamily: Noctuoidea
- Family: Erebidae
- Subfamily: Calpinae
- Genus: Egnasia; Walker, 1859

Type species
- Egnasia ephyrodalis Walker, 1858

Synonyms
- Margana Walker, 1866; Matella Moore, 1885; Spectrophysa Swinhoe, 1900; Talmala Poole, 1989; Talmela Nye, 1975

= Egnasia =

Genus of moths

Egnasia is a genus of moths of the family Erebidae. The genus was first described by Francis Walker in 1859.

== Description ==
Palpi with second joint very long and reaching far above vertex of head. The third with a tuft of hair on the inner side. Antennae usually almost simple in male. Thorax and abdomen smoothly scaled. Tibia moderately hairy. Forewings with acute apex. The outer margin angled at middle. Hindwings with crenulate (scalloped) outer margin. Vein 5 from below middle of discocellulars.

== Species ==
Some species of this genus are:

- Egnasia accingalis Walker, 1858 (India)
- Egnasia apicata Berio, 1956 (Congo)
- Egnasia berioi Viette, 1954 (Madagascar)
- Egnasia caduca swinhoe, 1892 (India)
- Egnasia castanea Moore, 1882 (India)
- Egnasia conifer Hampson, 1926 (Borneo, Philippines, Sumatra, Thailand)
- Egnasia dimorfica Berio, 1956 (Congo)
- Egnasia distorta Swinhoe, 1900 (Borneo, Sumatra)
- Egnasia dolabrata Berio, 1958 (Madagascar)
- Egnasia ephyrodalis Walker, 1858 (India, Bangladesh)
- Egnasia fasciata (Moore, 1882) (India)
- Egnasia hypomochla D. S. Fletcher, 1963 (Congo, Rwanda)
- Egnasia incurvata Gaede, 1940
- Egnasia lioperas A. E. Prout, 1922 (South Africa)
- Egnasia macularia Mabille, 1900 (Madagascar)
- Egnasia mesotypa Swinhoe, 1906 (India, Hong Kong)
- Egnasia microsema Hampson, 1926 (Ghana)
- Egnasia microtype Hampson, 1926 (Nigeria)
- Egnasia mimetica Berio, 1956 (Congo)
- Egnasia obscurata Mabille, 1898 (Madagascar)
- Egnasia ocellata (Moore, 1885) (Sri Lanka)
- Egnasia ochreivena Hampson, 1894 (India)
- Egnasia overdijkinki Prout, 1932 (Borneo, Java, Peninsular Malaysia)
- Egnasia participalis Walker, 1858 (India)
- Egnasia polia Hampson, 1891 (India)
- Egnasia rectilineata Swinhoe, 1890 (India)
- Egnasia rufifusalis Hampson, 1926 (Cameroon)
- Egnasia scoliogramma A. E. Prout, 1921 (Congo)
- Egnasia scotopasta Hampson, 1926 (Nigeria)
- Egnasia sinuosa Moore, 1882 (India)
- Egnasia sundana Kobes, 1983 (Borneo Sumatra, Thailand)
- Egnasia trogocraspia Hampson, 1926 (Nigeria)
- Egnasia tripuncta Swinhoe, 1890 (India)
- Egnasia vicaria (Walker, 1866) (Congo to South Africa, Kenya)
