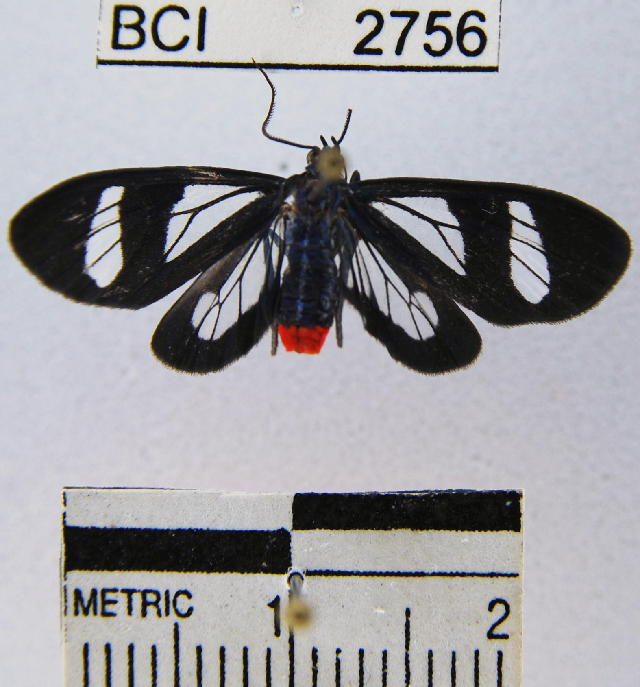
- Metastatia pyrrhorhoea

Scientific classification
- Domain: Eukaryota
- Kingdom: Animalia
- Phylum: Arthropoda
- Class: Insecta
- Order: Lepidoptera
- Superfamily: Noctuoidea
- Family: Erebidae
- Subfamily: Arctiinae
- Genus: Metastatia; Butler, 1876

Synonyms
- Hypocrita Hübner, 1808

= Metastatia =

Genus of moths

Metastatia is a genus of moths in the subfamily Arctiinae. The genus was erected by Arthur Gardiner Butler in 1876.

== Species ==
- Metastatia azurea Lathy, 1899
- Metastatia pyrrhorhoea Hübner, 1827
