= Tsarafidynia =

Scientific classification
- Domain: Eukaryota
- Kingdom: Animalia
- Phylum: Arthropoda
- Class: Insecta
- Order: Lepidoptera
- Superfamily: Noctuoidea
- Family: Erebidae
- Subfamily: Arctiinae
- Genus: Tsarafidynia; Griveaud, 1964

Genus of moths

Tsarafidynia is a genus of moths in the subfamily Arctiinae. The genus was erected by Paul Griveaud in 1964. Both species are known from Madagascar.

== Species ==
- Tsarafidynia blanci Griveaud, 1974
- Tsarafidynia perpusilla (Mabille, 1880)
