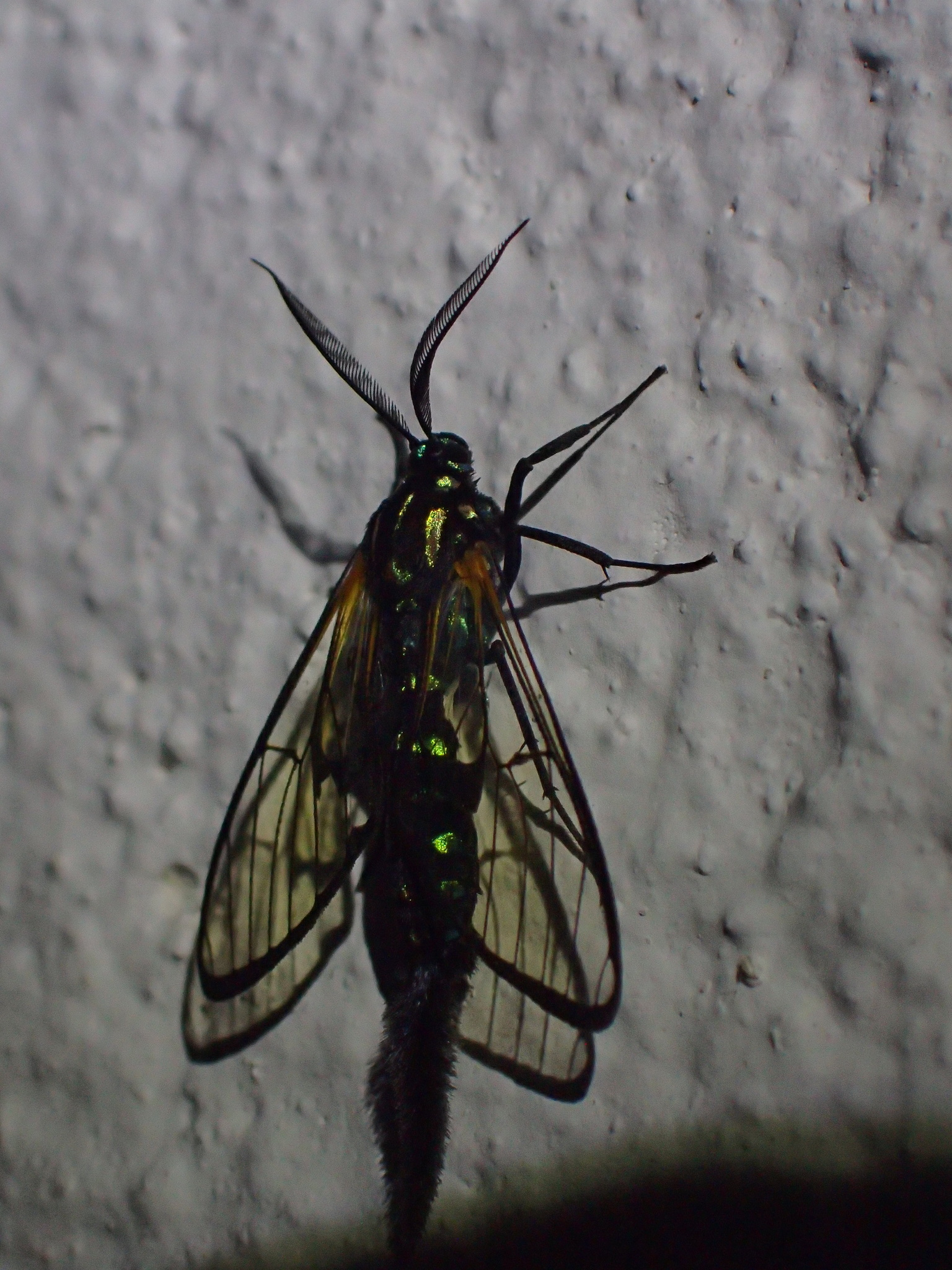

Scientific classification
- Kingdom: Animalia
- Phylum: Arthropoda
- Class: Insecta
- Order: Lepidoptera
- Superfamily: Noctuoidea
- Family: Erebidae
- Subfamily: Arctiinae
- Genus: Trichura
- Species: T. esmeralda

Binomial name
- Trichura esmeralda (Walker, 1854)

Synonyms
- Glaucopis esmeralda Walker, 1854

= Trichura esmeralda =

Species of moth

Trichura esmeralda is a moth in the subfamily Arctiinae. It was described by Francis Walker in 1854. It is found in Honduras, Guatemala and Colombia.
