= Trichura grandis =

Scientific classification
- Domain: Eukaryota
- Kingdom: Animalia
- Phylum: Arthropoda
- Class: Insecta
- Order: Lepidoptera
- Superfamily: Noctuoidea
- Family: Erebidae
- Subfamily: Arctiinae
- Genus: Trichura
- Species: T. grandis

Binomial name
- Trichura grandis Kaye, 1911

Species of moth

Trichura grandis is a moth in the subfamily Arctiinae. It was described by William James Kaye in 1911. It is found in São Paulo, Brazil.
