= Egnasia polia =

Scientific classification
- Kingdom: Animalia
- Phylum: Arthropoda
- Clade: Pancrustacea
- Class: Insecta
- Order: Lepidoptera
- Superfamily: Noctuoidea
- Family: Erebidae
- Genus: Egnasia
- Species: E. polia

Binomial name
- Egnasia polia Hampson, 1891

Synonyms
- Nagadeba polia (Hampson, 1891)

Species of moth

Egnasia polia is a moth of the family Noctuidae first described by George Hampson in 1891. It is found in India and Sri Lanka. Wingspan is 28 mm. Body fuscous grey in color. Forewing with the fulvous outer half of costal area. A grey patch and some white specks found on costa before apex. Cilia fulvous, with a black line through them. Hindwing with black spot at end of cell.
