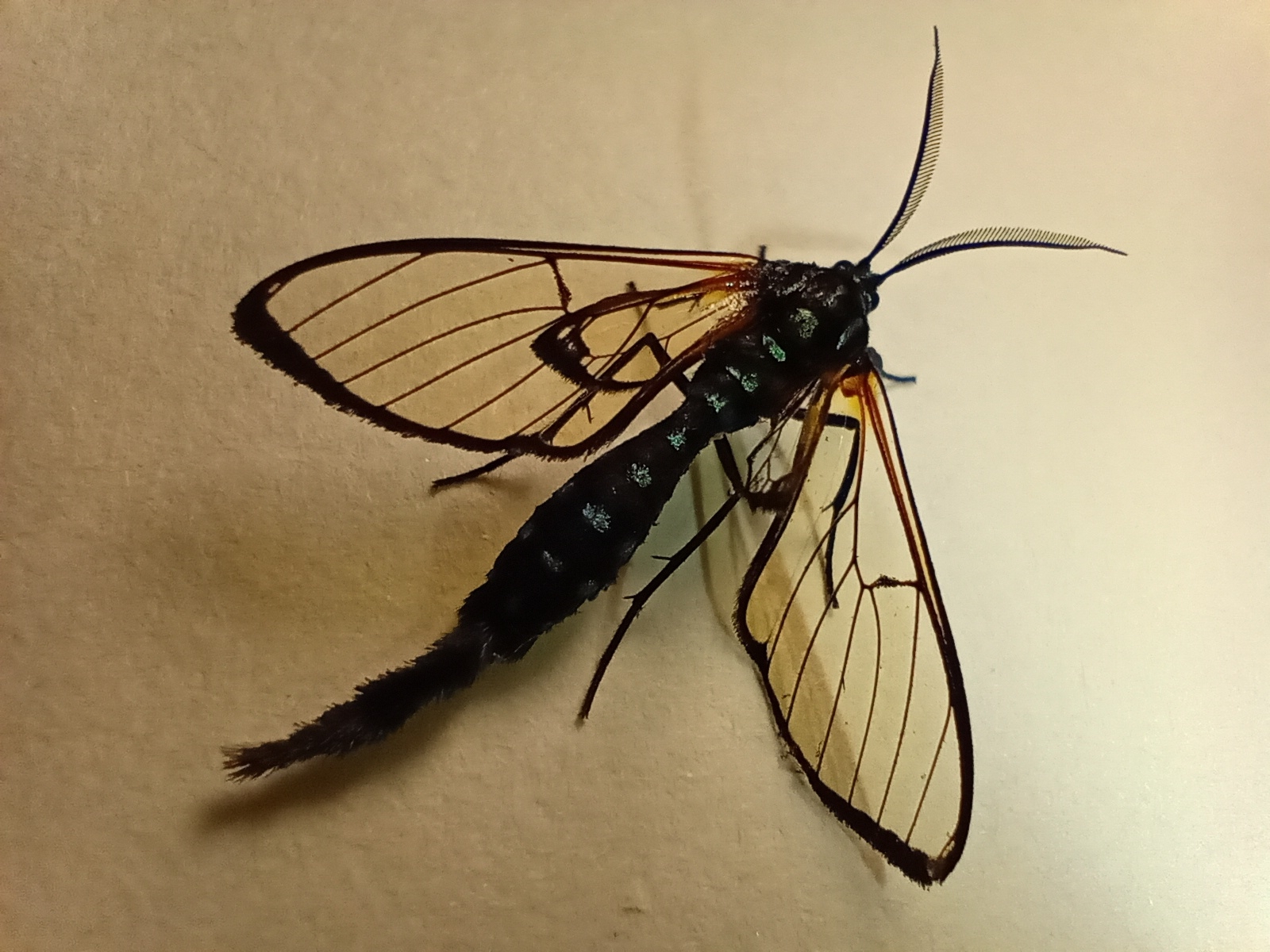

Scientific classification
- Kingdom: Animalia
- Phylum: Arthropoda
- Class: Insecta
- Order: Lepidoptera
- Superfamily: Noctuoidea
- Family: Erebidae
- Subfamily: Arctiinae
- Genus: Trichura
- Species: T. cerberus

Binomial name
- Trichura cerberus (Pallas, 1772)

Synonyms
- Sphynx cerberus Pallas, 1772; Zygaena caudata Fabricius, 1777; Cercophora urophora Herrich-Schäffer, [1855]

= Trichura cerberus =

Species of moth

Trichura cerberus is a moth in the subfamily Arctiinae. It was described by Peter Simon Pallas in 1772. It is found in Trinidad and the Brazilian states of São Paulo and Rio de Janeiro.
