= Egnasia accingalis =

Scientific classification
- Kingdom: Animalia
- Phylum: Arthropoda
- Clade: Pancrustacea
- Class: Insecta
- Order: Lepidoptera
- Superfamily: Noctuoidea
- Family: Erebidae
- Genus: Egnasia
- Species: E. accingalis

Binomial name
- Egnasia accingalis Walker, 1858

Synonyms
- Talmela accingalis Nye, 1975

Species of moth

Egnasia accingalis is a moth of the family Noctuidae first described by Francis Walker in 1858. It is found in India and Sri Lanka.

== Description ==
Its wingspan is 34 mm. Body bright ochreous with slight black suffusion. Forewings have a hyaline (glass-like) mark at the end of the cell. The outer line of both wings is slightly sinuous and evenly curved on both wings, not arising from near apex of hindwing. Caterpillars are known to feed on Canthium, Randia and Vangueria species.
