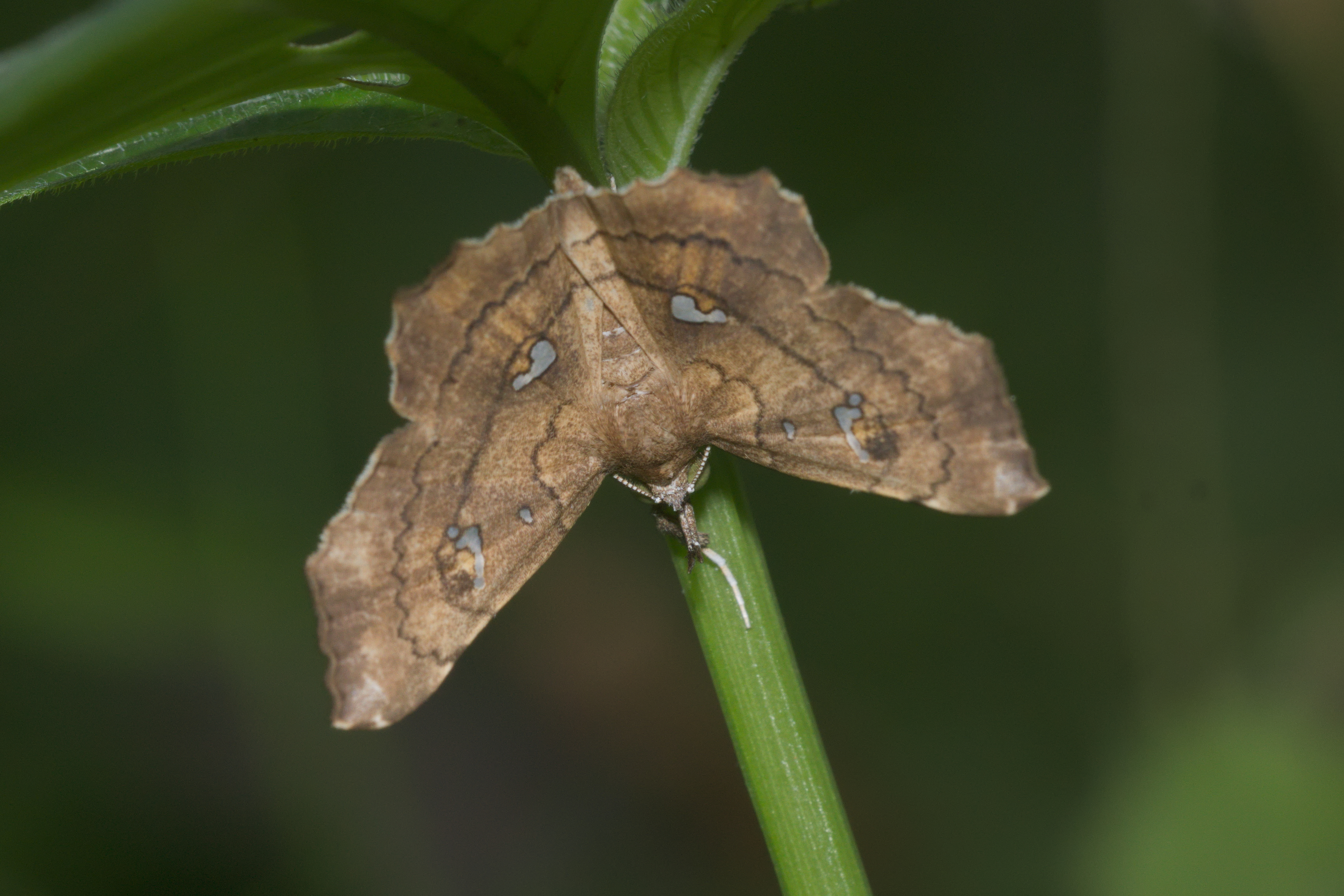
- Upperside
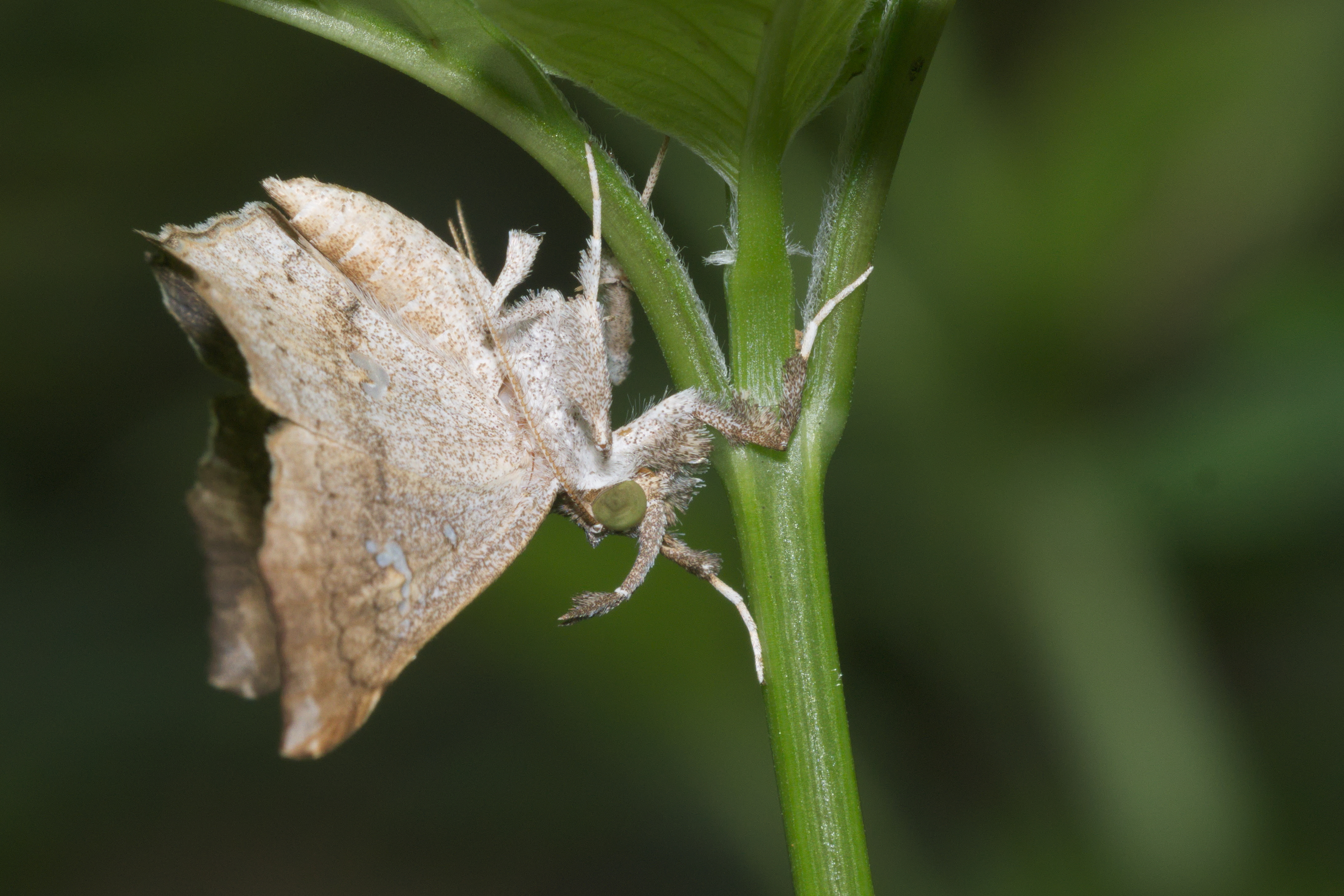
- Underside

Scientific classification
- Domain: Eukaryota
- Kingdom: Animalia
- Phylum: Arthropoda
- Class: Insecta
- Order: Lepidoptera
- Superfamily: Noctuoidea
- Family: Erebidae
- Genus: Egnasia
- Species: E. mesotypa

Binomial name
- Egnasia mesotypa C. Swinhoe, 1906

= Egnasia mesotypa =

Species of moth

Egnasia mesotypa is a species of moth of the family Erebidae. It was described by Charles Swinhoe in 1906. It is known from India and Hong Kong.
