= Egnasia participalis =

Scientific classification
- Kingdom: Animalia
- Phylum: Arthropoda
- Clade: Pancrustacea
- Class: Insecta
- Order: Lepidoptera
- Superfamily: Noctuoidea
- Family: Erebidae
- Genus: Egnasia
- Species: E. participalis

Binomial name
- Egnasia participalis Walker, 1891

Synonyms
- Egnasia euphrona (Swinhoe 1891)

Species of moth

Egnasia participalis is a moth of the family Noctuidae first described by Francis Walker in 1891. It is found in India and Sri Lanka. It has a 28 mm wingspan, a yellow-colored body and a forewing with the lunulate hyaline (glass-like) mark at the end of the cell. The outer lines of both wings are slightly sinuous. In the hindwing, the outer line rises from near the apex.
