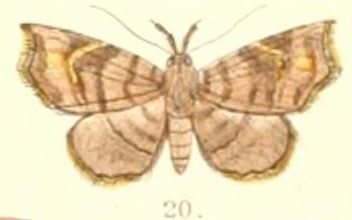

Scientific classification
- Domain: Eukaryota
- Kingdom: Animalia
- Phylum: Arthropoda
- Class: Insecta
- Order: Lepidoptera
- Superfamily: Noctuoidea
- Family: Erebidae
- Genus: Egnasia
- Species: E. fasciata

Binomial name
- Egnasia fasciata (Moore, 1882)

Synonyms
- Thyridospila fasciata Moore, 1882

= Egnasia fasciata =

Species of moth

Egnasia fasciata is a species of moth of the family Noctuidae first described by Frederic Moore in 1882. It is known from India.
