= Mazaeras francki =

Scientific classification
- Kingdom: Animalia
- Phylum: Arthropoda
- Class: Insecta
- Order: Lepidoptera
- Superfamily: Noctuoidea
- Family: Erebidae
- Subfamily: Arctiinae
- Genus: Mazaeras
- Species: M. francki

Binomial name
- Mazaeras francki Schaus, 1896

Synonyms
- Elysius francki

Species of moth

Mazaeras francki is a moth of the family Erebidae. It was described by William Schaus in 1896. It is found in Brazil.
