= Mazaeras melanopyga =

Scientific classification
- Kingdom: Animalia
- Phylum: Arthropoda
- Class: Insecta
- Order: Lepidoptera
- Superfamily: Noctuoidea
- Family: Erebidae
- Subfamily: Arctiinae
- Genus: Mazaeras
- Species: M. melanopyga

Binomial name
- Mazaeras melanopyga (Walker, 1869)

Synonyms
- Eucereon melanopyga Walker, 1869

Species of moth

Mazaeras melanopyga is a moth of the family Erebidae. It was described by Francis Walker in 1869. It is found in Brazil.
