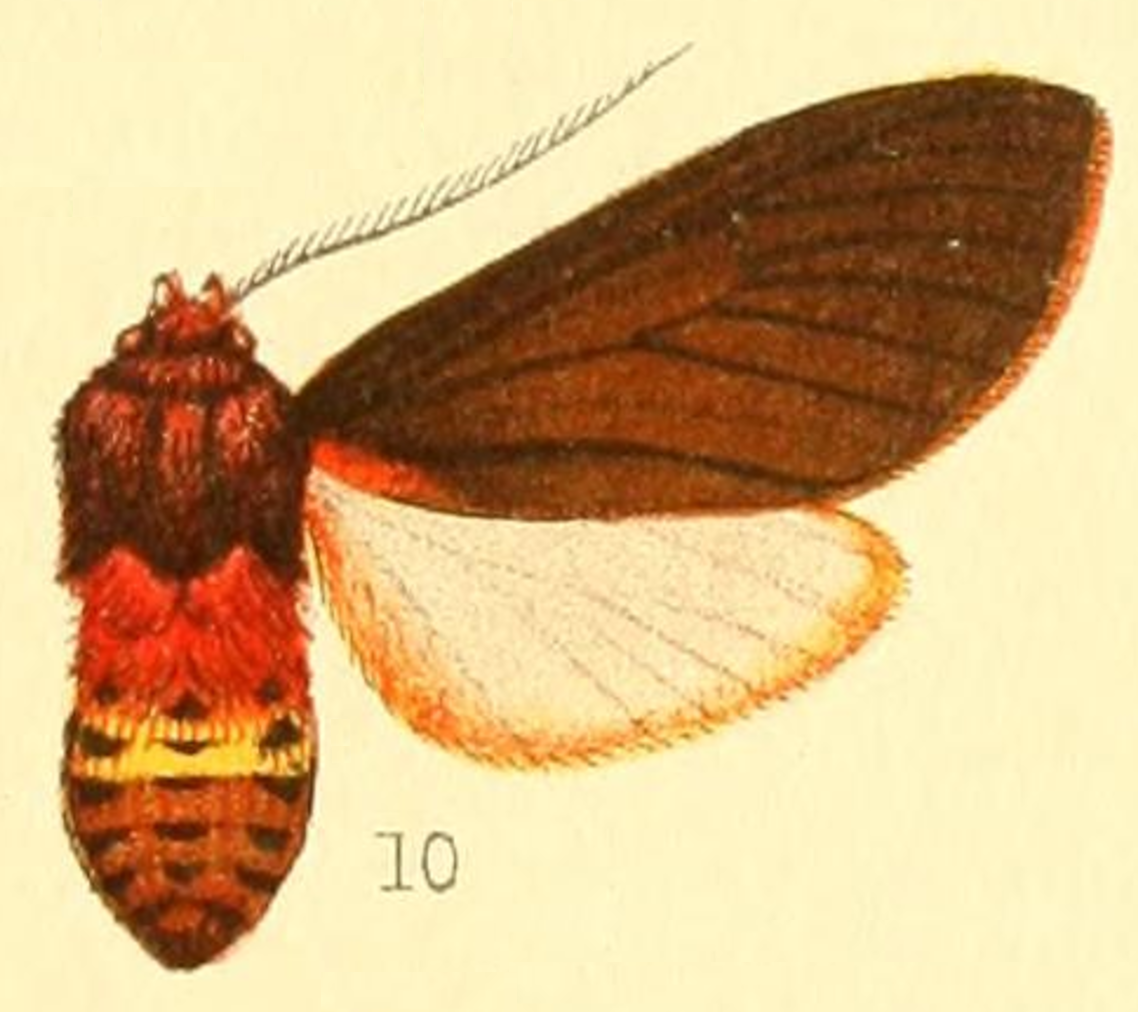
- Male

Scientific classification
- Domain: Eukaryota
- Kingdom: Animalia
- Phylum: Arthropoda
- Class: Insecta
- Order: Lepidoptera
- Superfamily: Noctuoidea
- Family: Erebidae
- Subfamily: Arctiinae
- Genus: Mazaeras
- Species: M. soteria

Binomial name
- Mazaeras soteria H. Druce, 1900

Synonyms
- Elysius soteria Hampson, 1901

= Mazaeras soteria =

Species of moth

Mazaeras soteria is a moth of the family Erebidae. It was described by Herbert Druce in 1900. It is found in Argentina.
