= Tsarafidynia blanci =

Scientific classification
- Domain: Eukaryota
- Kingdom: Animalia
- Phylum: Arthropoda
- Class: Insecta
- Order: Lepidoptera
- Superfamily: Noctuoidea
- Family: Erebidae
- Subfamily: Arctiinae
- Genus: Tsarafidynia
- Species: T. blanci

Binomial name
- Tsarafidynia blanci Griveaud, 1974

Species of moth

Tsarafidynia blanci is a moth in the subfamily Arctiinae. It was described by Paul Griveaud in 1974. It is found on Madagascar.
