= Trichura druryi =

Scientific classification
- Kingdom: Animalia
- Phylum: Arthropoda
- Clade: Pancrustacea
- Class: Insecta
- Order: Lepidoptera
- Superfamily: Noctuoidea
- Family: Erebidae
- Subfamily: Arctiinae
- Genus: Trichura
- Species: T. druryi

Binomial name
- Trichura druryi Hübner, 1826

Species of moth

Trichura druryi is a moth in the subfamily Arctiinae. It was described by Jacob Hübner in 1826. It is found in Mexico, Guatemala, Panama and Honduras.
