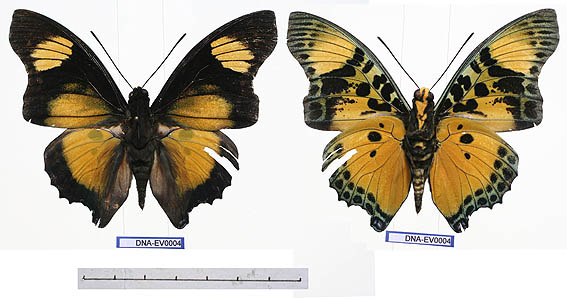

Scientific classification
- Kingdom: Animalia
- Phylum: Arthropoda
- Clade: Pancrustacea
- Class: Insecta
- Order: Lepidoptera
- Family: Nymphalidae
- Genus: Charaxes
- Species: C. fournierae

Binomial name
- Charaxes fournierae Le Moult, 1930

= Charaxes fournierae =

Species of butterfly

Charaxes fournierae, the euphaedra charaxes, is a butterfly in the family Nymphalidae. It is found in Guinea, Ivory Coast, Ghana, Cameroon, Gabon, the Republic of the Congo, the Central African Republic, the Democratic Republic of the Congo, Rwanda and Uganda.

== Biology ==
The habitat consists of lowland tropical moist broadleaf forests. The nominate subspecies resembles Euphaedra adonina and Euphaedra justicia, while subspecies jolybouyeri is closest to Euphaedra sarcoptera. All three of these euphaedras fly high up on occasion. It is puzzling that a non-aposematic charaxes should apparently mimic species of non-aposematic Euphaedra .

== Subspecies ==
- Charaxes fournierae fournierae (Cameroon, Gabon, Congo, Central African Republic, western Democratic Republic of the Congo)
- Charaxes fournierae jolybouyeri Vingerhoedt, 1998 (Guinea, Ivory Coast, Ghana) considered a full species by Vingerhoedt et al.
- Charaxes fournierae kigeziensis Howarth, 1969. (Uganda: south-west to south-west Kigezi)
- Charaxes fournierae vandenberghei Collins, 1982 (Rwanda: west to the Nyungwe Forest)

== Discovery ==
"Around 1930, I trained a hunter, Mr. Pichot, a very intelligent and resourceful man, who, having gone to Africa, in turn educated many natives.Seeing the magnificent results he was obtaining, I asked him to look for me an extremely rare butterfly, of which there were perhaps two or three copies all over the world, the Charaxes Acraeoides. I specified that the female had never before been captured, and that consequently, if he ever provided me with one, I would immediately send him a few thousand francs. And one day, I received an enthusiastic letter: "I have the female, you will receive her shortly". I spent a few days of fever and a few nights of insomnia. Finally, the parcel arrived, and, to my amazement, I found that the butterfly so gloriously announced was not the female of the Charaxes Acraeoides, but the male of another Charaxes of an absolutely unknown species. Mr. Pichot's mistake was that the butterfly was indeed the size that could be assumed of a female of Acraeoides, but he did not understand that its colours, much more vivid, prevented it from being one. Madame Fournier, my best Parisian client, as soon as she saw this wonderful lepidopteran, never ceased [in her wish] to possess it. I sold it to her, not without first describing and baptizing it, by the name of its new owner. I named my rarity Charaxes Fournierae.Le Moult (Eugène), Mes chasses aux papillons, Editions Pierre Horay, 1955, p. 283-284.

== Etymology ==
The name honours Aimée Fournier de Horrack.

== Taxonomy ==
Charaxes acraeoides group.

the supposed clade members are:

- Charaxes acraeoides
- Charaxes fournierae rare
- Charaxes jolybouyeri (as subspecies above) rare
