= Trichura fumida =

Scientific classification
- Domain: Eukaryota
- Kingdom: Animalia
- Phylum: Arthropoda
- Class: Insecta
- Order: Lepidoptera
- Superfamily: Noctuoidea
- Family: Erebidae
- Subfamily: Arctiinae
- Genus: Trichura
- Species: T. fumida

Binomial name
- Trichura fumida Kaye, 1914

Species of moth

Trichura fumida is a moth in the subfamily Arctiinae. It was described by William James Kaye in 1914. It is found in Trinidad.
