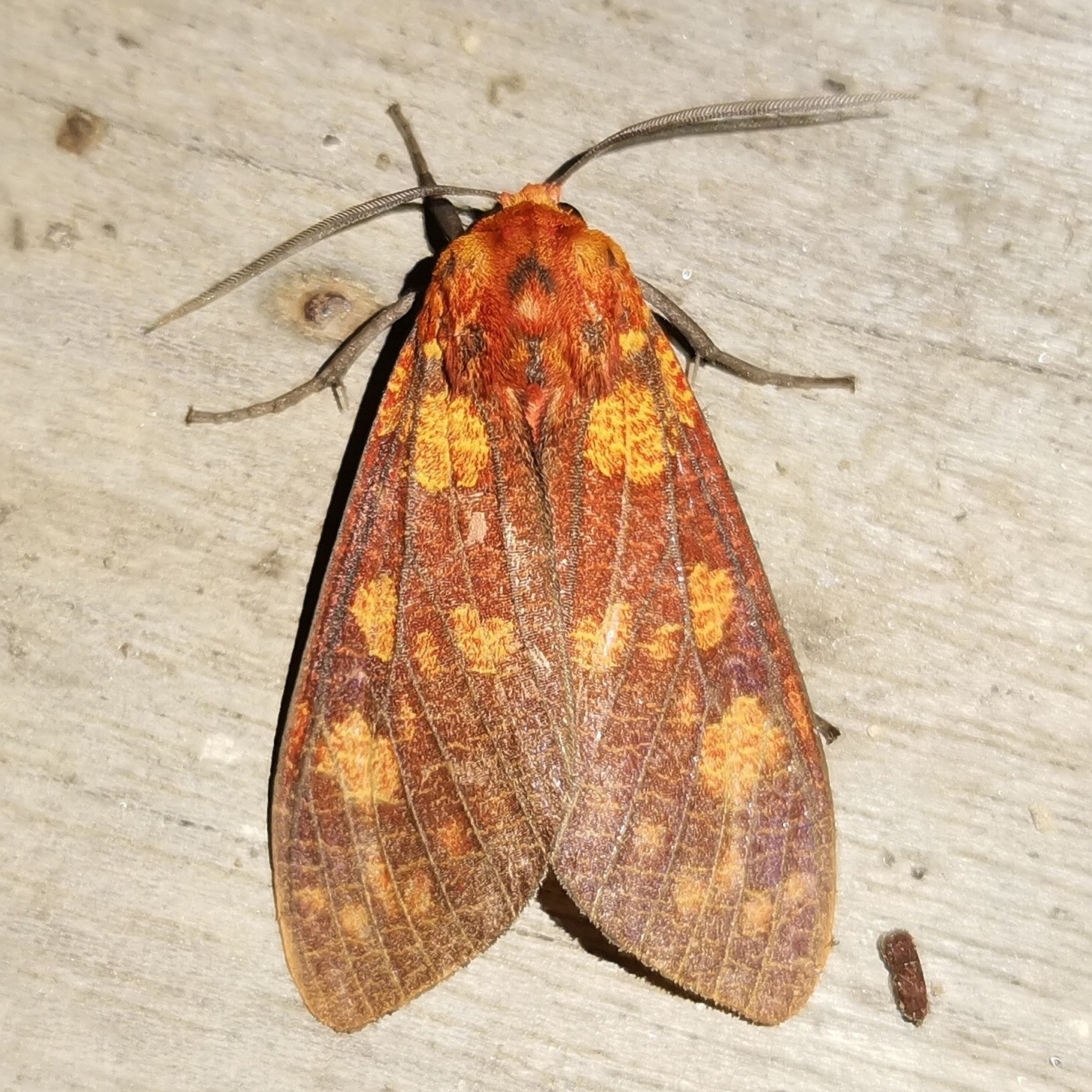

Scientific classification
- Kingdom: Animalia
- Phylum: Arthropoda
- Class: Insecta
- Order: Lepidoptera
- Superfamily: Noctuoidea
- Family: Erebidae
- Subfamily: Arctiinae
- Subtribe: Phaegopterina
- Genus: Mazaeras; Walker, 1855

= Mazaeras =

Genus of moths

Mazaeras is a genus of moths in the family Erebidae. The genus was erected by Francis Walker in 1855.

== Species ==
- Mazaeras conferta Walker, 1855
- Mazaeras francki Schaus, 1896
- Mazaeras janeira (Schaus, 1892)
- Mazaeras macasia (Schaus, 1924)
- Mazaeras magnifica (Rothschild, 1909)
- Mazaeras mediofasciata (Joicey & Talbot, 1916)
- Mazaeras melanopyga (Walker, 1869)
- Mazaeras soteria Druce, 1900
