= Mazaeras janeira =

Scientific classification
- Domain: Eukaryota
- Kingdom: Animalia
- Phylum: Arthropoda
- Class: Insecta
- Order: Lepidoptera
- Superfamily: Noctuoidea
- Family: Erebidae
- Subfamily: Arctiinae
- Genus: Mazaeras
- Species: M. janeira

Binomial name
- Mazaeras janeira (Schaus, 1892)

Synonyms
- Sychesia janeira Schaus, 1892; Elysius disciplaga distincta Rothschild, 1935

Species of moth

Mazaeras janeira is a moth of the family Erebidae. It was described by William Schaus in 1892. It is found in Brazilian states of Rio de Janeiro and Rio Grande do Sul.
