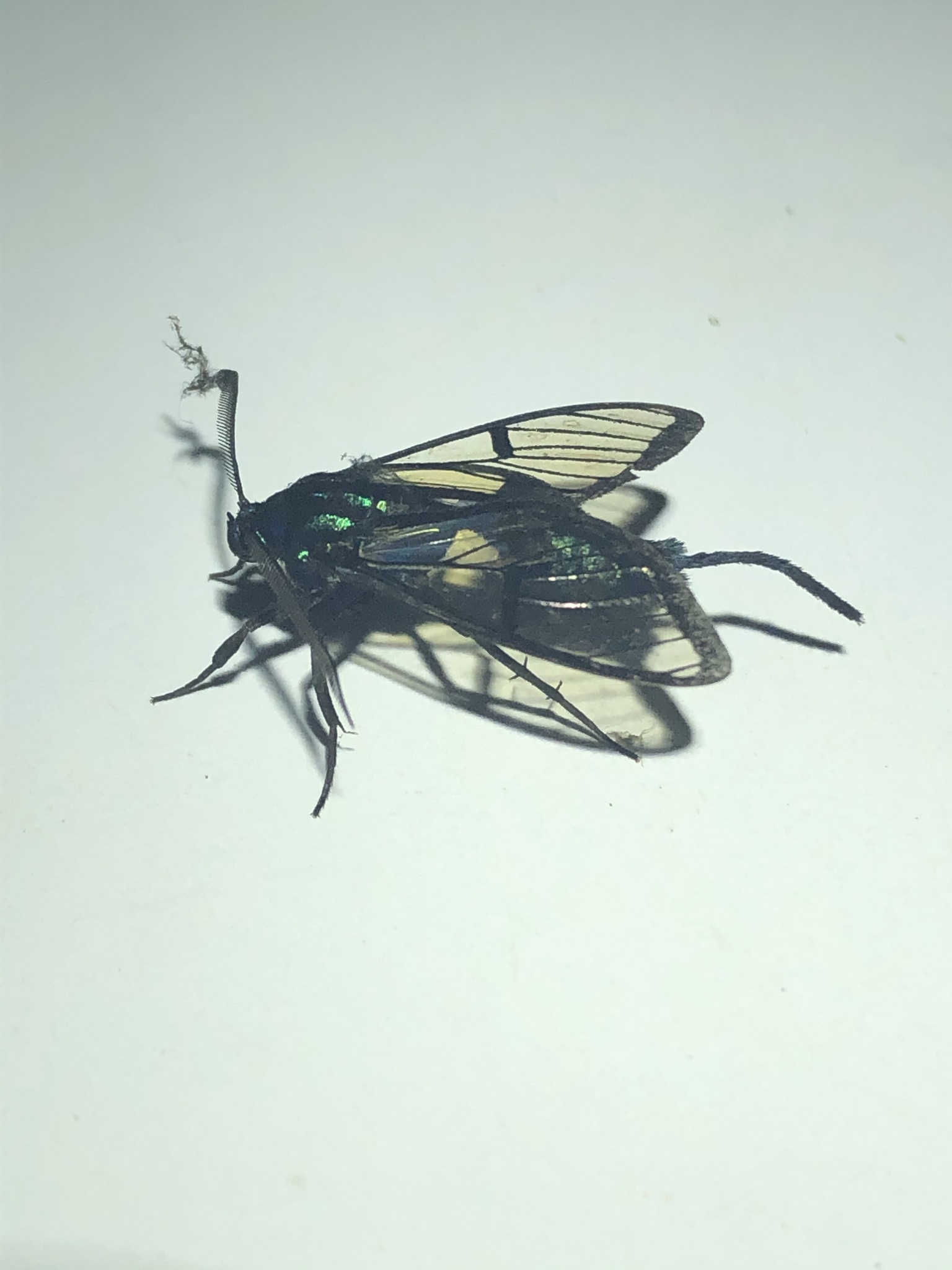

Scientific classification
- Kingdom: Animalia
- Phylum: Arthropoda
- Class: Insecta
- Order: Lepidoptera
- Superfamily: Noctuoidea
- Family: Erebidae
- Subfamily: Arctiinae
- Genus: Trichura
- Species: T. latifascia

Binomial name
- Trichura latifascia (Walker, 1854)

Synonyms
- Glaucopis latifascia Walker, 1854; Trichura ribbei Druce, 1884

= Trichura latifascia =

Species of moth

Trichura latifascia is a moth in the subfamily Arctiinae. It was described by Francis Walker in 1854. It is found in Panama, Colombia, French Guiana and Pará, Brazil.

== Subspecies ==
- Trichura latifascia latifascia (Brazil: Para)
- Trichura latifascia ismene Möschler, 1878 (Panama, Colombia, French Guiana)
