= Trichura viridis =

Scientific classification
- Domain: Eukaryota
- Kingdom: Animalia
- Phylum: Arthropoda
- Class: Insecta
- Order: Lepidoptera
- Superfamily: Noctuoidea
- Family: Erebidae
- Subfamily: Arctiinae
- Genus: Trichura
- Species: T. viridis

Binomial name
- Trichura viridis Gaede, 1926

Species of moth

Trichura viridis is a moth in the subfamily Arctiinae. It was described by Max Gaede in 1926. It is found in Colombia.
