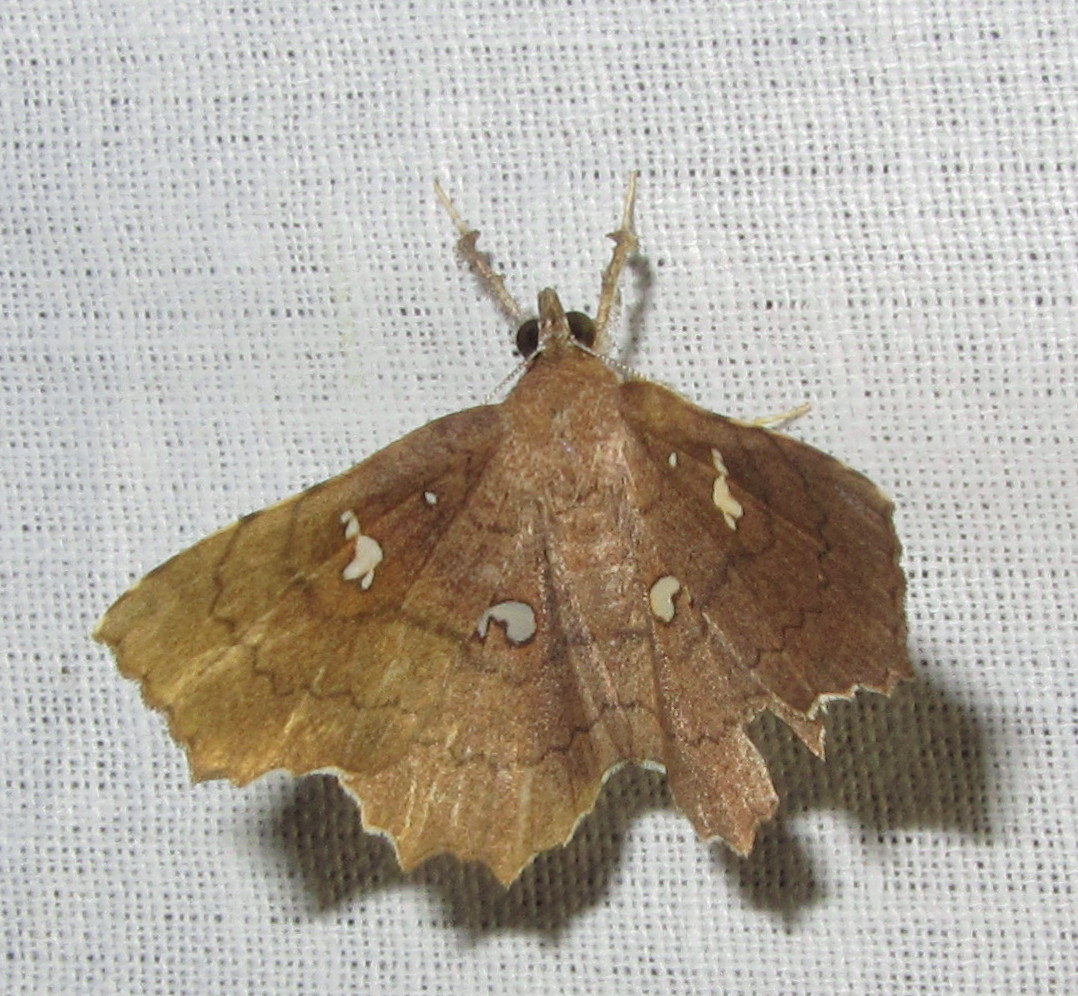

Scientific classification
- Kingdom: Animalia
- Phylum: Arthropoda
- Clade: Pancrustacea
- Class: Insecta
- Order: Lepidoptera
- Superfamily: Noctuoidea
- Family: Erebidae
- Genus: Egnasia
- Species: E. ephyrodalis

Binomial name
- Egnasia ephyrodalis Walker, 1858

= Egnasia ephyrodalis =

Species of moth

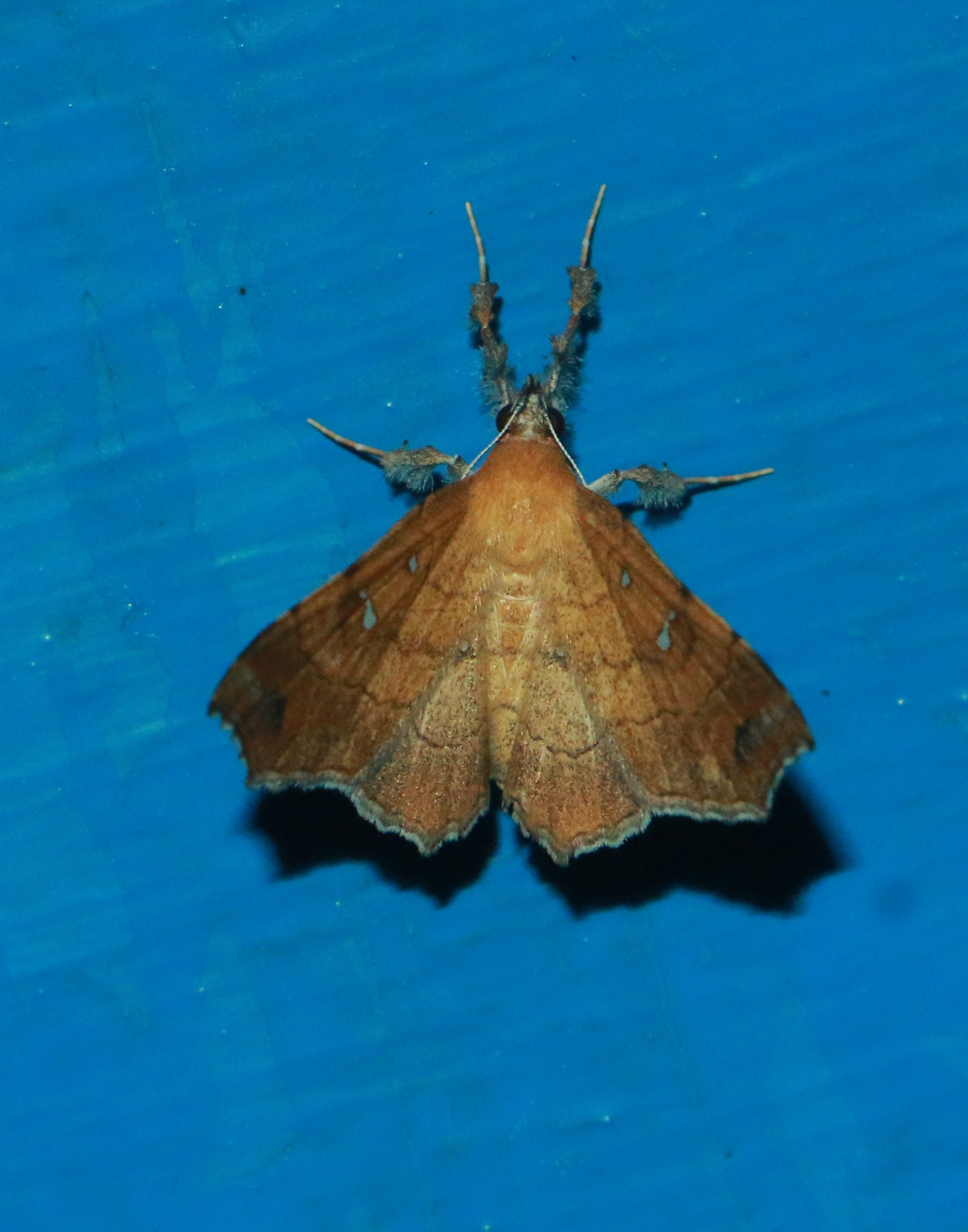
Egnasia ephyrodalis from koottanad Palakkad Kerala India

Egnasia ephyrodalis is a moth of the family Noctuidae first described by Francis Walker in 1858.

== Distribution ==
It is found in India, Sri Lanka, Bangladesh, Thailand and Myanmar.

== Description ==
Its wingspan is 34 mm. Head, thorax, abdomen and wings are yellowish brown. Forewing with an acute apex. Thorax and abdomen has smooth scales. A hyaline (glass-like) spot is found in the cell and an irregular hyaline spot found on the discocellulars composed of conjoined spots. Hindwings with crenulate outer margin. A hyaline lunulate mark is found on a rufous patch at end of cell. Cilia whitish at apex and towards anal angle. Underside of the wings are suffused with grey.
