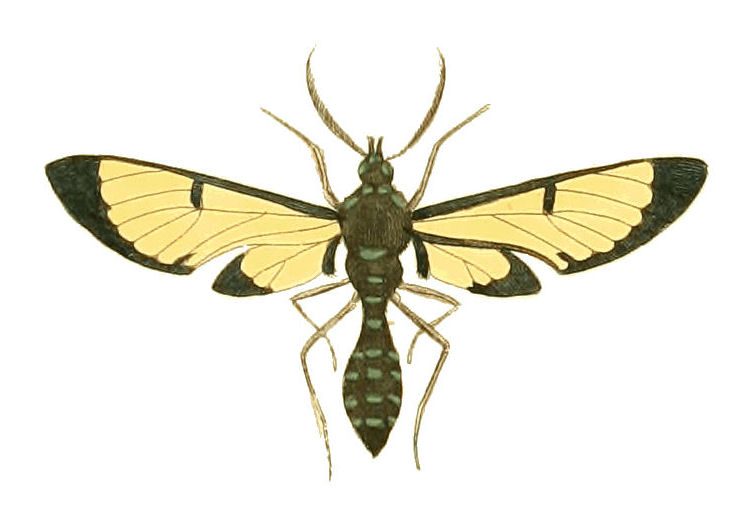
- Female

Scientific classification
- Domain: Eukaryota
- Kingdom: Animalia
- Phylum: Arthropoda
- Class: Insecta
- Order: Lepidoptera
- Superfamily: Noctuoidea
- Family: Erebidae
- Subfamily: Arctiinae
- Genus: Trichura
- Species: T. coarctata

Binomial name
- Trichura coarctata (Drury, 1773)

Synonyms
- Sphinx coarctata Drury, 1773

= Trichura coarctata =

Species of moth

Trichura coarctata is a moth in the subfamily Arctiinae. It was described by Dru Drury in 1773. It is found in Brazil (Para, Pernambuco).

== Description ==
Upperside: Antennae pectinated, and thickest in the middle. Head black, with a blue spot in front. Neck blue. Thorax black, with an orange spot on each shoulder. Abdomen black; smallest next the thorax, with a row of golden-blue spots on each side, and another at the top; at the extremity is placed a hairy bristle, about a quarter the length of the abdomen. Wings yellowish and transparent. The anterior having a black narrow border running round all their edges, except the anterior ones; and in the middle of each is an oblong black spot, joining to the anterior edge, which reaches almost halfway across the wing. Posterior wings with a black border along the abdominal edges and the upper corners; the anterior and external edges having none. The extremity of the body of the male is furnished with a villose tail, as long as the body.

Underside: Palpi externally white but internally black. Tongue curled up. Breast black, the sides being blue. Legs black. Thighs white within, and blue without. Abdomen, next the thorax, white; the remainder being black, with four white spots on each side; that next the anus being the smallest. Wings as on the upperside; except the anterior, which have a yellowish border running along the posterior edges. Wingspan 1 3/4 inches (45 mm).
