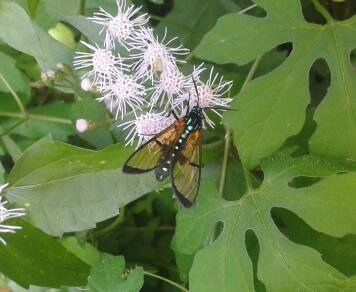

Scientific classification
- Kingdom: Animalia
- Phylum: Arthropoda
- Clade: Pancrustacea
- Class: Insecta
- Order: Lepidoptera
- Superfamily: Noctuoidea
- Family: Erebidae
- Subfamily: Arctiinae
- Tribe: Arctiini
- Genus: Trichura; Hübner, [1819]

Synonyms
- Cercophora Herrich-Schäffer, [1854]

= Trichura =

Genus of moths

Trichura is a genus of moths in the subfamily Arctiinae erected by Jacob Hübner in 1819.

== Species ==
- Trichura aurifera Butler, 1876
- Trichura cerberus Pallas, 1772
- Trichura coarctata Drury, 1773
- Trichura cyanea Schaus, 1872
- Trichura dixanthia Hampson, 1898
- Trichura druryi Hübner, 1826
- Trichura esmeralda Walker, 1854
- Trichura fasciata Rothschild, 1911
- Trichura frigida (Burmeister, 1878)
- Trichura fulvicaudata Lathy, 1899
- Trichura fumida Kaye, 1914
- Trichura grandis Kaye, 1911
- Trichura latifascia Walker, 1854
- Trichura mathina Druce, 1898
- Trichura melanosoma Hampson, 1898
- Trichura pusilla Rothschild, 1911
- Trichura viridis Gaede, 1926
