= Trichura frigida =

Scientific classification
- Domain: Eukaryota
- Kingdom: Animalia
- Phylum: Arthropoda
- Class: Insecta
- Order: Lepidoptera
- Superfamily: Noctuoidea
- Family: Erebidae
- Subfamily: Arctiinae
- Genus: Trichura
- Species: T. frigida

Binomial name
- Trichura frigida (Burmeister, 1878)

Synonyms
- Eurata frigida Burmeister, 1878

Species of moth

Trichura frigida is a moth in the subfamily Arctiinae. It was described by Hermann Burmeister in 1878. It is found in Argentina.
