= Egnasia ocellata =

Scientific classification
- Kingdom: Animalia
- Phylum: Arthropoda
- Clade: Pancrustacea
- Class: Insecta
- Order: Lepidoptera
- Superfamily: Noctuoidea
- Family: Erebidae
- Genus: Egnasia
- Species: E. ocellata

Binomial name
- Egnasia ocellata (Moore, 1885)

Synonyms
- Zethes ocellata Moore, 1885

Species of moth

Egnasia ocellata is a moth of the family Noctuidae. It is found in Sri Lanka. Wingspan is 22mm. Body is dull red-brown color. Fore wing with traces of five waved lines angled below the costa. Reniform greyish with a dark center. Hind wing with traces of a dark antemedial band, on which is a black-centered grey spot on the discocellulars. Both wings are with lunulate marginal line. Underside of wings slightly suffused with grey.
