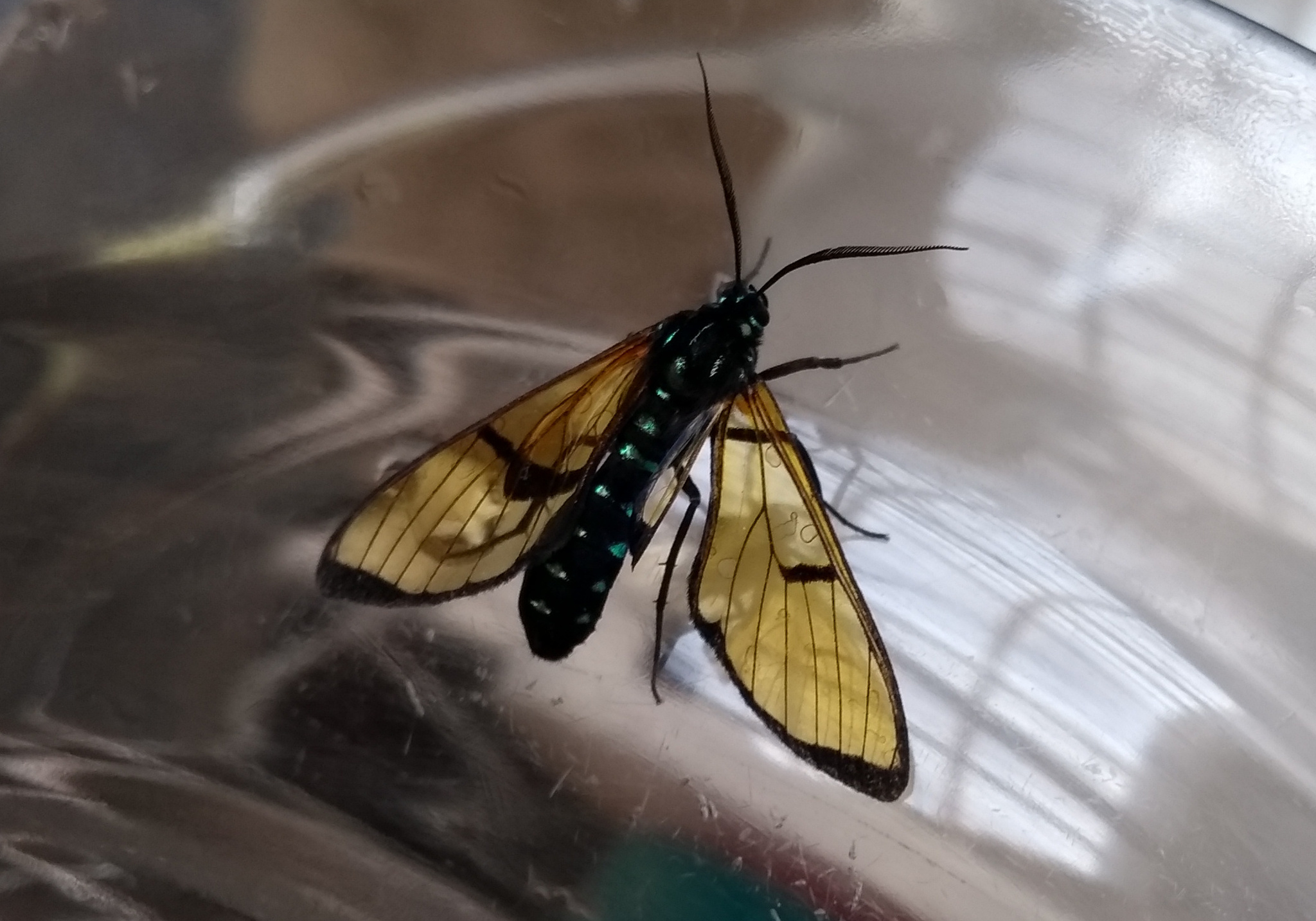

Scientific classification
- Kingdom: Animalia
- Phylum: Arthropoda
- Class: Insecta
- Order: Lepidoptera
- Superfamily: Noctuoidea
- Family: Erebidae
- Subfamily: Arctiinae
- Genus: Trichura
- Species: T. melanosoma

Binomial name
- Trichura melanosoma Hampson, 1898

= Trichura melanosoma =

Species of moth

Trichura melanosoma is a moth in the subfamily Arctiinae. It was described by George Hampson in 1898. It is found in Santa Catarina, Brazil.
