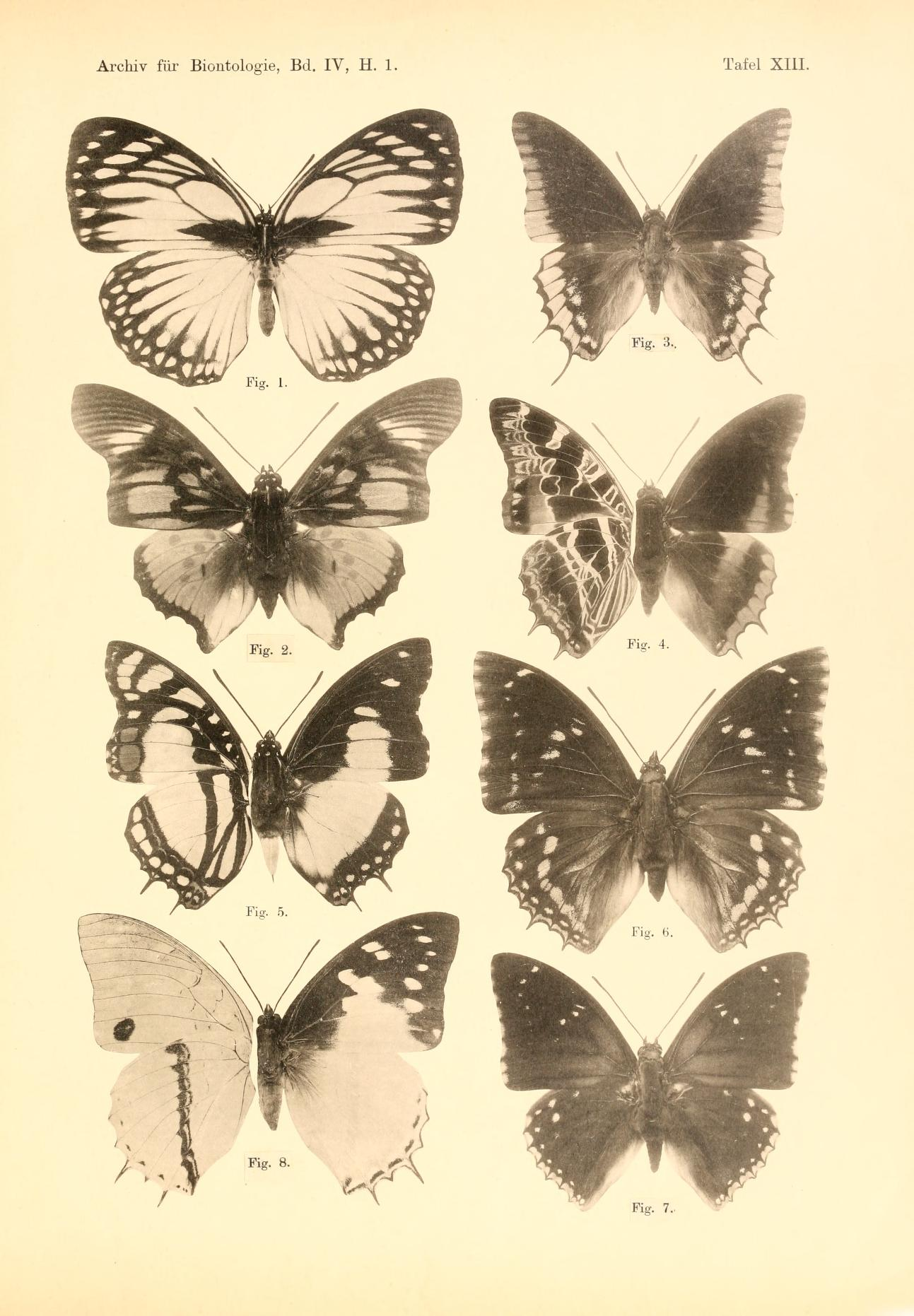
- Figure 2

Scientific classification
- Kingdom: Animalia
- Phylum: Arthropoda
- Clade: Pancrustacea
- Class: Insecta
- Order: Lepidoptera
- Family: Nymphalidae
- Genus: Charaxes
- Species: C. acraeoides

Binomial name
- Charaxes acraeoides H. Druce, 1908

= Charaxes acraeoides =

Species of butterfly

Charaxes acraeoides is a butterfly in the family Nymphalidae first described by Herbert Druce in 1908. It is found in Cameroon, Gabon, the Republic of the Congo, the Central African Republic and the Democratic Republic of the Congo.

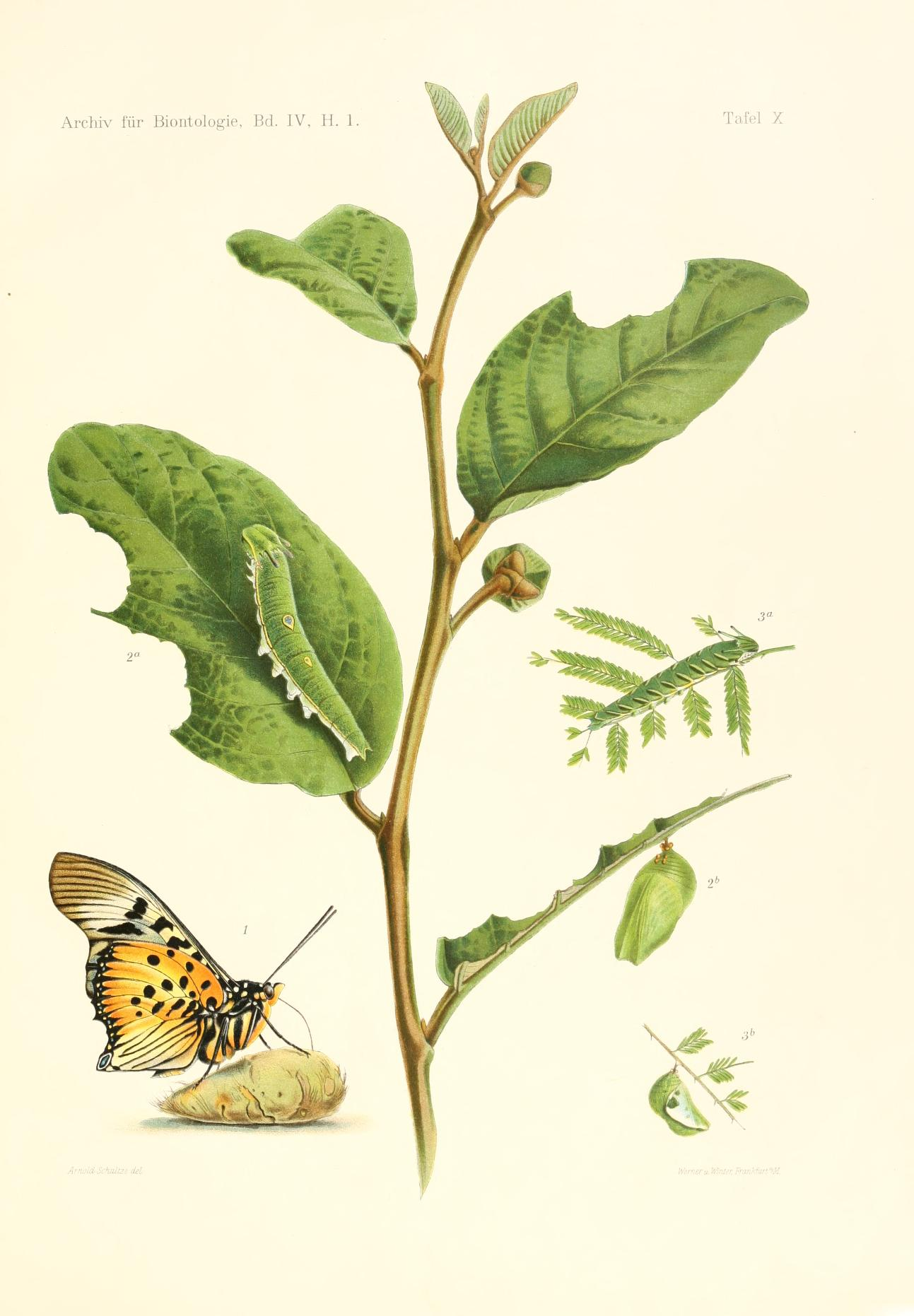
Figure 1, male imbibing nutrient liquids from African civet dung. Also shown are the larvae and pupae of other Charaxes species.

== Description ==
It is one of the two Charaxes species with strikingly elongated forewings the outer margin of which are concave. The other is the less falcate Charaxes fournierae. The ground colour is black, the pattern is dull red.

Original description

"Charaxes acraeoides, sp. n.

Male.—Head black, with four yellow spots, two on each side above the eye; antennae black; collar, tegular, thorax, and abdomen black; a white spot on the thorax just behind the collar and two yellow spots on each side of the thorax;palpi above black, the underside orange-yellow; the underside of the thorax and abdomen orange-yellow; the legs black. Primaries [forewings] black, crossed near the apex by a band of four elongated cream-coloured spots, the inner margin streaked with red, above which are five large red spots, the one nearest the anal angle the largest: secondaries [hindwings] red, black at the base and partly along the inner margin, the anal angle and part of the inner margin cream-colour; a black streak at the end of the cell, with the black spots on the underside showing through; the outer margin from the apex to the anal angle black, with a series of minute white dots in the middle of the black margin. Underside: primaries, the apical part of the wing pale yellowish brown, the veins and streaks between the veins black; the cream-coloured band as above, edged on the inner side by a band of black spots which extend along the outer margin to the anal angle; the cell and the central part of wing greenish grey; the usual black marks in the cell; the wing below the cell to the inner margin orange-red: secondaries orange-red, palest above the cell and above the anal angle; the outer margins and veins all black; four large black spots on the costal margin, four in the cell, and a row of five partly round the outside of the cell; the black outer margin is spotted with blue and greenish-grey dots.

Expanse 4 and 1/2 inches.

Hab. Cameroons, Bitje, Ja River, 2000 feet; wet season (Mus. Druce). This species reminds one at first sight of Pseudacraea clarki, Butler, which also came in the collection."

Female The female was not described until 1976

== Biology ==
These are fast-flying butterflies which are part of a mimicry ring with Acraea and Pseudacraea species.

== Habitat ==
The habitat consists of primary forest (Congolian forests).

== Realm ==
Afrotropical realm.

== Taxonomy ==
Charaxes acraeoides group

The supposed clade members are

- Charaxes acraeoides
- Charaxes fournierae rare
- Charaxes jolybouyeri rare
