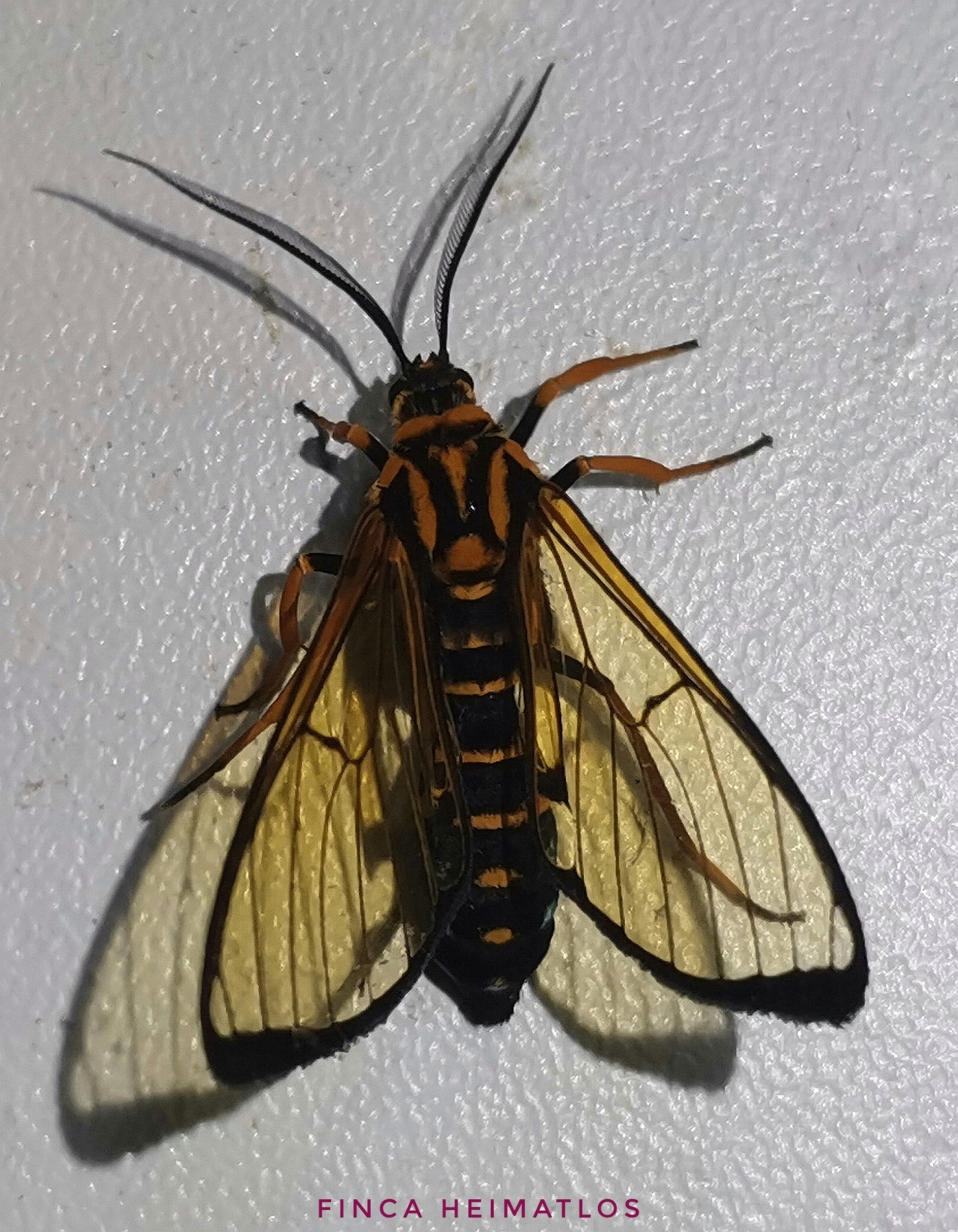

Scientific classification
- Kingdom: Animalia
- Phylum: Arthropoda
- Class: Insecta
- Order: Lepidoptera
- Superfamily: Noctuoidea
- Family: Erebidae
- Subfamily: Arctiinae
- Genus: Trichura
- Species: T. aurifera

Binomial name
- Trichura aurifera Butler, 1876

= Trichura aurifera =

Species of moth

Trichura aurifera is a moth in the subfamily Arctiinae. It was described by Arthur Gardiner Butler in 1876. It is found in Pará, Brazil.
