= George Talbot (entomologist) =

English entomologist (1882–1952)

George Talbot FES
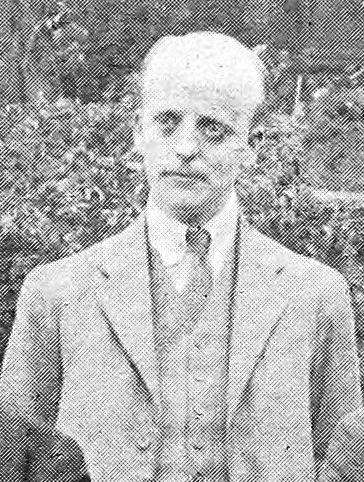
- Talbot in 1920
- Born: 26 October 1882; Croydon, Surrey
- Died: 13 April 1952 (aged 69); North-west Surrey
- Occupation: Entomologist
- Notable work: The Bulletin of the Hill Museum 1921-1932

George Talbot FES (26 October 1882 – 13 April 1952) was an English entomologist who specialised in butterflies. He wrote about 150 scientific papers, the majority being primarily systematic, consisting of the description of new species or the revision of various genera. He was also responsible for the curation and preservation of the Joicey collection of Lepidoptera prior to its accession by the Natural History Museum.

== Life and career ==
George Talbot was born "in rather humble circumstances" in Croydon, Surrey, in 1882. As a young man, he was assistant to Percy Ireland Lathy. He then curated for the wealthy amateur butterfly collector Herbert Adams, followed by the insect dealer William Frederick Henry Rosenberg. During the First World War he worked with Arthur Bacot at the Lister Institute on trench fever and typhus diseases carried by lice.

From 1915, he was head curator of the large and increasing collection of amateur lepidopterist James John Joicey at the Hill Museum in Witley, Surrey. In 1916, supported by Oxford professor E. B. Poulton, he was granted conditional exemption from military service due to the importance of the collection. He then saw active service from 1917 in the Labour Corps followed by the Royal Army Medical Corps. Talbot wrote numerous scientific papers with Joicey during the active period of the Museum (see below) and, as head curator, was largely responsible for the condition of the collection bequeathed to the Natural History Museum in 1934.

After Joicey's death in 1932, Talbot worked at the British Museum (Natural History), then at the Hope Department of Entomology, Oxford, and finally at the British Pest Infestation Division of the Ministry of Food.

Talbot was married in 1916 to Jessie A Barney. He died in Surrey in 1952.

== Contributions to Entomology ==
Talbot became a Fellow of the Entomological Society in 1908. He wrote about 150 papers, many of them generic revisions in the Bulletin of the Hill Museum (1921–1932) (which he also co-edited with Joicey) and in the series entitled The Fauna of British India, Including Ceylon and Burma. His best known works are his monograph on Delias (a revision of the whole genus) and the three Pieridae volumes of Lepidopterorum Catalogus published by Wilhelm Junk.

Through his work as an entomologist, Talbot "won for himself a position of eminence and respect in his own sphere."

== Selected works ==
- A monograph of the pierine genus Delias, v + 656 p., 2 illus., LXXI pl. (part. col.), in six parts (1928–1937). The first five parts were published by John Bale, Sons & Danielsson under the auspices of the Hill Museum (1928–1930); the last part by the British Museum (Natural History) (1937). Fifteen of the seventy-one plates are chromolithographs. John Bale were one of the last (possibly the last) firm of chromolithographers in London.
- In Lepidopterorum Catalogus. Dr W. Junk Publishers, Berlin and The Hague. (1911-1939), in three volumes:
  - Pieridae: I (53, 1932), II (60, 1934), III (66, 1935)
- In The Fauna of British India, Including Ceylon and Burma. Taylor and Francis, London, in two volumes:
  - Butterflies. Vol. 1. Papilionidae, Pieridae, xxix + 600 p., 184 fig., 1 folding map, 3 col. pl. (1939)
  - Butterflies. Vol. 2. Danaidae to Acraeidae, xv + 506 p., 104 figs, 2 col. pl. (1947)

With James John Joicey:

- New Species of Heterocera from Dutch New Guinea. Ann. Mag. Nat. Hist. (8)15: 295-301, pl. XII (1915)
- New Lepidoptera from the Schouten Islands. Trans. Entomol. Soc. Lond. 64(1): 65–83, pls 3–6 (1916)
- New Heterocera from Dutch New Guinea. Ann. Mag. Nat. Hist (8)20: 50–87, pls 1–4 (1917)
- New Lepidoptera from Waigeu, Dutch New Guinea and Biak. Ann. Mag. Nat. Hist. (8)20: 216–229 (1917)
- New South-American Rhopalocera. Proc. Zool. Soc. Lond. 1917: 259-264, pl I (1918)
- New South-American Arctiidae. Proc. Zool. Soc. Lond. 1917: 265-270, pl I (1918)
- New butterflies from Africa and the east. Proc. Zool. Soc. Lond. 1917: 271-272 (1918)
- A Gynandromorph of Papilio lycophron Hbn. Proc. Zool. Soc. Lond. 1917: 273, pl II (1918)
- Three Aberrations of Lepidoptera. Proc. Zool. Soc. Lond. 1917: 275-276, pl I (1918)
- New forms of Indo-Australian butterflies. Bull. Hill Mus. 1(3): 565–569 (1924)
- New forms of Lepidoptera Rhopalocera. Encycl. Entomol. (B III Lepidoptera)2: 1–14 (1926)
- New forms of Rhopalocera in the Hill Museum. Bull. Hill Mus. 2(1): 19–27 (1928)
- Also see the BioNames database linking taxonomic names to their original descriptions.
