= Mazaeras macasia =

Scientific classification
- Domain: Eukaryota
- Kingdom: Animalia
- Phylum: Arthropoda
- Class: Insecta
- Order: Lepidoptera
- Superfamily: Noctuoidea
- Family: Erebidae
- Subfamily: Arctiinae
- Genus: Mazaeras
- Species: M. macasia

Binomial name
- Mazaeras macasia (Schaus, 1924)

Synonyms
- Elysius macasia Schaus, 1924; Elysius castrensis Rothschild, 1917

Species of moth

Mazaeras macasia is a moth of the family Erebidae. It was described by William Schaus in 1924. It is found in Brazil and Ecuador.

== Subspecies ==
- Mazaeras macasia macasia (Ecuador)
- Mazaeras macasia castrensis (Rothschild, 1917) (Brazil)
