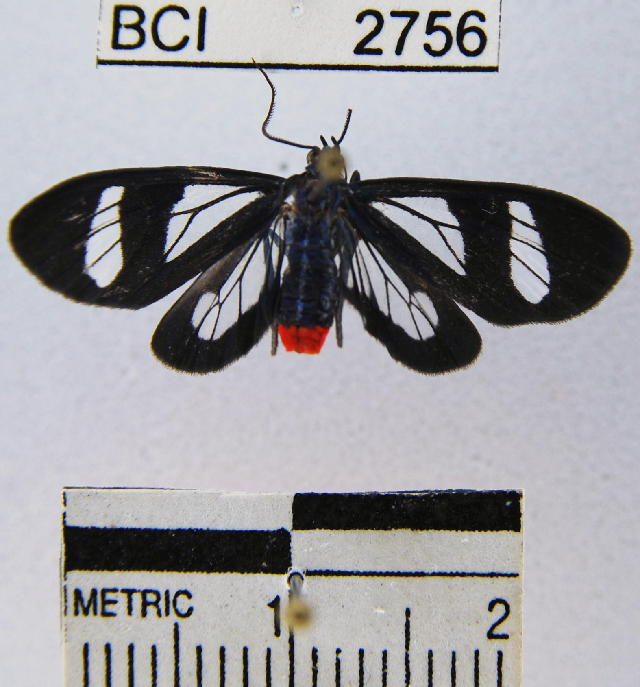

Scientific classification
- Kingdom: Animalia
- Phylum: Arthropoda
- Class: Insecta
- Order: Lepidoptera
- Superfamily: Noctuoidea
- Family: Erebidae
- Subfamily: Arctiinae
- Genus: Metastatia
- Species: M. pyrrhorhoea

Binomial name
- Metastatia pyrrhorhoea (Hübner, 1818)

Synonyms
- Hyelosia pyrrhorhoea Hübner, 1818

= Metastatia pyrrhorhoea =

Species of moth

Metastatia pyrrhorhoea is a moth of the subfamily Arctiinae. It was described by Jacob Hübner in 1818. It is found in Guyana and Brazil (Pará), Costa Rica and Panama.
