= Herbert Jordan Adams =

English entomologist (1838–1912)

- Born: 1838; London
- Died: 1 March 1912 (aged 73–74); Enfield
- Occupation: Entomologist

Herbert Jordan Adams (1838 – 1 March 1912) was an English entomologist.

Adams was born in London in 1838. His schoolboy collection of butterflies and moths formed the basis of an excellent collection of British Lepidoptera. Following the death of his mother and the sale of her house and land at Chase Park, Enfield, Adams moved to a nearby house, Roseneath, and amassed 68 cabinets and some 600 cartons of European and World butterflies. He employed Percy Ireland Lathy to curate the collection and describe the new species it contained. He became a fellow of the Royal Entomological Society in 1877.

Adams died at Enfield in 1912. His collection of British Lepidoptera was bequeathed to the Enfield Entomological Society, of which he was a co-founder. The main collection, containing very rare species of Papilionidae, Ornithoptera, Morpho, Agrias, Catagramma, Prepona, and Charaxes, was given to the Natural History Museum where it is now conserved.
