= Aimée Fournier de Horrack =

French entomologist (1876–1952)

- Born: 30 August 1876
- Died: 25 February 1952 (aged 75)
- Scientific career
- Fields: Entomology

Aimée Fournier de Horrack (30 August 1876 – 25 February 1952) was a French entomologist.

She is also known as Mlle de Horrack and Mme Gaston Fournier. Aimée Fournier was a butterfly collector. She lived in Paris at 90, Boulevard Malesherbes. Her collection is in Muséum National d'Histoire Naturelle. She is honoured in the name Charaxes fournierae.

== Works ==
1921 with Percy Ireland Lathy Thèses entomologiques (Lepidoptéres) : notes et remarques sur les Agrias : aquarelles de Mlles de La Roche et Trottet, MM. d'Apreval, Houlbert et Rouy d'apre's les originaux de Mlle du Puigaudeau (Odix). fascicule 1 Paris : [G. de Malherbe],
