= Percy Ireland Lathy =

English entomologist (1874–1943)

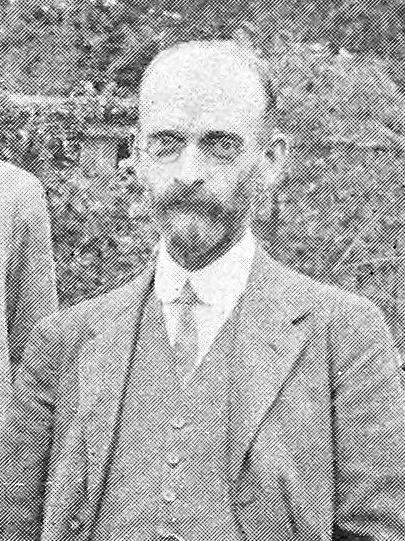
- Lathy in 1920
- Born: 1874; Pulborough, West Sussex
- Died: 8 September 1943 (aged c. 69); Vittel, France
- Occupation: Entomologist

Percy Ireland Lathy (1874 – 8 September 1943) was an English entomologist who specialised in butterflies. He was an acquaintance of James John Joicey and was associated with Joicey's Hill Museum in Witley, Surrey.

== Life and career ==
Percy Ireland Lathy was born in Pulborough, West Sussex, in 1874. He lived for some time at Tillington.

Lathy was first assistant to William Watkins, in Eastbourne then curator for Herbert Jordan Adams in Enfield (this collection is now in the Natural History Museum, London). At this time, on Adams' behalf, he collected in the West Indies (especially Jamaica) and South America and employed collectors who were sent to Peru and Dutch New Guinea. He also acquired the Honrath and van de Poll collections for Adams. After Adams' death in 1912, he worked for Cabinet Le Moult in Paris then for Aimée Fournier de Horrack. Aimée Fournier de Horrack was a leading figure in literary and musical circles and had a private butterfly collection containing very rare and expensive species of Morpho, Agrias, Catagramma, Prepona, Papilionidae, Ornithoptera, Charaxes, Riodininae and Lycaenidae. The Aimée Fournier collection is now in Muséum national d'histoire naturelle. "L'essentiel des insectes [Parides] provient de collections privées comme celle, classée monument historique et riche en papillons exotiques, de Mme Aimée Fournier de Horrack".

Lathy lived for some years in Paris at 90 Boulevard Malesherbes (Aimée Fournier's address) and then at 70, Boulevard Auguste Blanqui and, after 1928, in New York City. He was a specialist in Lepidoptera. Lathy was a member of the Société Entomologique de France (presented by Eugène Le Moult), the Entomological Society of London, the Zoological Society of London and the Entomological Society of America.

After retirement Lathy lived at Gagny in Seine-et-Oise. He died in a German internment camp in Vittel, France, in 1943.

== Works ==
Partial list

- 1898 "A new species of Charaxes from Siam", Entomologist 31 : 192-193
- 1898 "A new species of Charaxes", Entomologist 31 : 226-227
- 1901 "An account of a collection of Rhopalocera made at Zomba in British Central Africa", Transactions of the Entomological Society of London 1901:19-36
- 1903 "An account of a collection of Rhopalocera made on the Anambara Creek in Nigeria, West Africa", Transactions of the Entomological Society of London 1903:183-206.
- 1904 "A Contribution Towards the Knowledge of the Lepidoptera-Rhopalocera of Dominica, B.W.I., Proceedings of the Zoological Society of London 1 (30): 450–453
- 1906 A Contribution towards the knowledge of African Rhopalocera Trans. Ent. Soc. Lond. 1906 (1) : 1–10, pl. 1-2
- 1907 "Notes on the Indo-Australian Papilionidae", Trans. ent. Soc. Lond. 55(1) : 1-6 1 plate
- 1912 Lathy & Rosenberg, 1912 "Notes on the genus Catasticta, with descriptions of new species", Trans. ent. Soc. Lond. 1911 (3) : 519–527, pl. 45-46
- 1913 "New butterflies from Nias", Entomologist, 46 : 98–101, 135-138
- 1921 with Aimée Fournier de Horrack, "Thèses entomologiques (Lepidoptéres) : notes et remarques sur les Agrias : aquarelles de Mlles de La Roche et Trottet, MM. d'Apreval, Houlbert et Rouy d'apres les originaux de Mlle du Puigaudeau "(Odix). fascicule 1 Paris : [G. de Malherbe],
- 1922 "An account of the Castniinae in the collection of Madame Gaston Fournier (Lepidoptera)", Annals and Magazine of Natural History (9)9(49):68-86
- 1926 "Notes sur les Charaxes de la collection de Madame G. Fournier", Encycl. Ent. (B3) 1 : 93–97, pl. 2-3
- 1926 "Notes on the American Theclinae (Lepidoptera)", Annals and Magazine of Natural History, 17, 35–47
- 1930 "Notes on South American Lycaenidae, with description of new species", Trans. ent. Soc. Lond. 78 : 133-137
- 1932 "The genus Lamprospilus (Lepidoptera)", Annals and Magazine of Natural History, 9: 180–182
