= Paul Mabille =

French naturalist

- Born: 23 September 1835; Tours, France
- Died: 6 April 1923 (aged 87); Perreux, Loire, France
- Scientific career
- Fields: Zoology, botany
- Author abbrev. (botany): Mabille

Paul Mabille (1835 – 6 April 1923) was a French naturalist mainly interested in Lepidoptera and botany.

Mabille was born in 1835 in Tours, France. He was a member and President (1876–1877) of the Société entomologique de France and a member of the Société entomologique de Belgique. His Madagascar collections, once in the Charles Oberthur collection, are now in the Natural History Museum, London.

He wrote many papers on Neotropical Hesperiidae with Eugène Boullet. From 1865 to 1868 he edited the exsiccata Herbarium Corsicum. Mabille died in April 1923 in Perreux, Loire.

== Works ==
partial list Wikispecies (see below) provides another list and links to digitised papers by Mabille

- 1876 Diagnoses d’Hesperiens Bulletin de la Société Entomologique de France (5)213–215.
- 1876 Sur la classification des Hesperiens avec la description de plusieurs espèces nouvelles. Annales de la Société Entomologique de France (5)251–274.
- 1876 Catalogue des Lepidopteres de la cote occidental d’Afrique. Bulletin de la Société Zoologique de France 1:194–203; 274–281.
- 1877 La description de trois espèces nouvelles de lepidopteres de Madagascar Bulletin de la Société Entomologique de France (5)37–39.
- 1877 Diagnoses de nouvelles espèces d’Hesperides Bulletin de la Société Entomologique de France (5)39–40.
- 1877 Diagnoses de quelques espece nouvelles de Lepidopteres provenent de Madagascar. Bulletin de la Société Entomologique de France (5)71–73.
- 1877 Diagnose d’Hesperides. Petites Nouvelles Entomoloqiques 2:114.
- 1877 Diagnoses de Lepidopteres de Madagascar. Petites Nouvelles Entomoloqiques 2:157–158.
- 1883 Description d'hespéries. Bulletin de la Société Entomologique de Belgique 27:LI–LXXVIII.
- 1884 Descriptions de Lépidoptéres exotiques Bulletin de la Société Entomologique de Belgique 28 : clxxxiv–cxci, [184–191]
- 1908 Essai de révision de la famille des hespérides. Annales des Sciences naturelles (Zoologie) (9)7(4/6): 167 207, pls. 13 14
- 1912 Essai de révision de la famille des hespérides. Annales des Sciences naturelles (Zoologie) (9)16(1/4): 1 159, 2 pls.
- 1916 Description d'hespérides nouveaux (Lep. Hesperiinae, Sect. B). Bulletin de la Société entomologique de France 1916(15): 243 247
- 1917 Description d'hespérides nouveaux (Lep. Hesperiinae, Sect. B). Bulletin de la Société entomologique de France 1916(20): 320 325
- 1917 Description d'hespérides nouveaux (Lep.). Bulletin de la Société entomologique de France 1917(1): 54 60
- 1917 Description d'hespérides nouveaux (Lep. Hesperiinae, Sect. B). Bulletin de la Société entomologique de France 1917(4): 97 101
- 1919 Essai de révision de la famille des hespérides. Annales des Sciences naturelles (Zoologie) (10)2(4/6): 199 258
- with Paul Vuillot
- 1890–1895. Novitates lepidopterologicae. Paris, Paul Vuillot.Various parts, text and plates

See African Butterfly database for Mabille publications on butterflies of Africa
