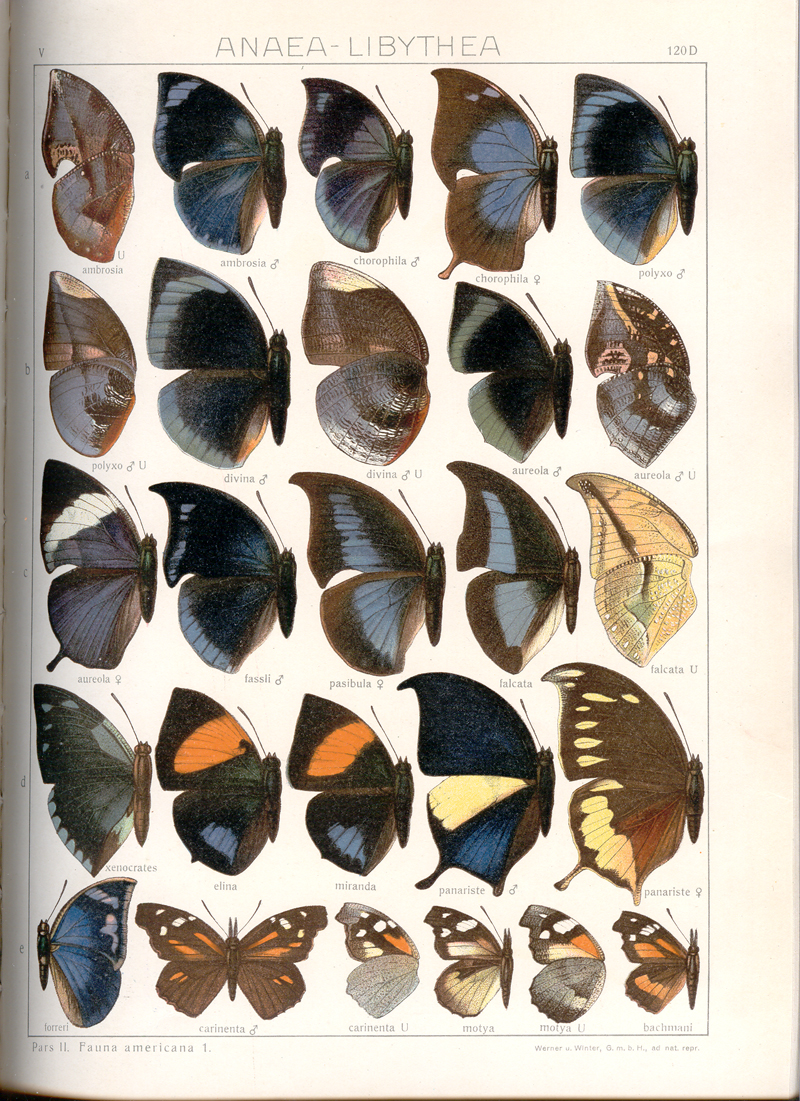
- subspecies divina

Scientific classification
- Kingdom: Animalia
- Phylum: Arthropoda
- Class: Insecta
- Order: Lepidoptera
- Family: Nymphalidae
- Genus: Memphis
- Species: M. dia

Binomial name
- Memphis dia (Godman and Salvin, 1884)

= Memphis dia =

Species of butterfly

Memphis dia is a species of leafwing found in South America.

- Memphis dia dia is present in Panama and Mexico.
- Memphis dia divina (Röber, 1916) is present in Panama and Bolivia.

Memphis dia is a butterfly with forewings with a humped costal edge, pointed apex, almost straight outer edge and angular inner angle. The top is navy blue with a metallic blue border. The underside is brown with metallic grey reflections and simulates a dead leaf.Seitz - A. dia S. and G. Male: wings greenish-black; the forewings at the base of a hardly stronger green colour, with a lustrous light-green curved subapical band of 3 to 5 mm breadth, being parted by the veins, reaching the anal angle, touching the margin in the posterior half of the border and being continued on the hindwings as the same marginal band and reaching their anal angle. Fringes white; hindwings without tails. The under surface is without markings, dark silky brown, the apex of the forewing and the margin of the hind- wing grey, the dorsal area of the hindwing somewhat lighter. — The most closely allied with the Brazilian polyxo, differing, however, by the colouring of the upper surface of both wings, which are more green than blue. Panama. On the whole, the upper surface greatly resembles that of A. florita (120 Bb), but instead of the spots before the apex there is a small oblique band with a more intense blue lustre than the blue basal part. — A. divina Stgr. i. 1. (120 Db) from Bolivia (Coroico, 1200 m, A. H. Fassl) and the Upper Amazon resembles the preceding species above and beneath, though it is much more imposing. The magnificent upper surface is equalled by the entirely different under surface. The female is unfortunately not known to us. It is very rare.
