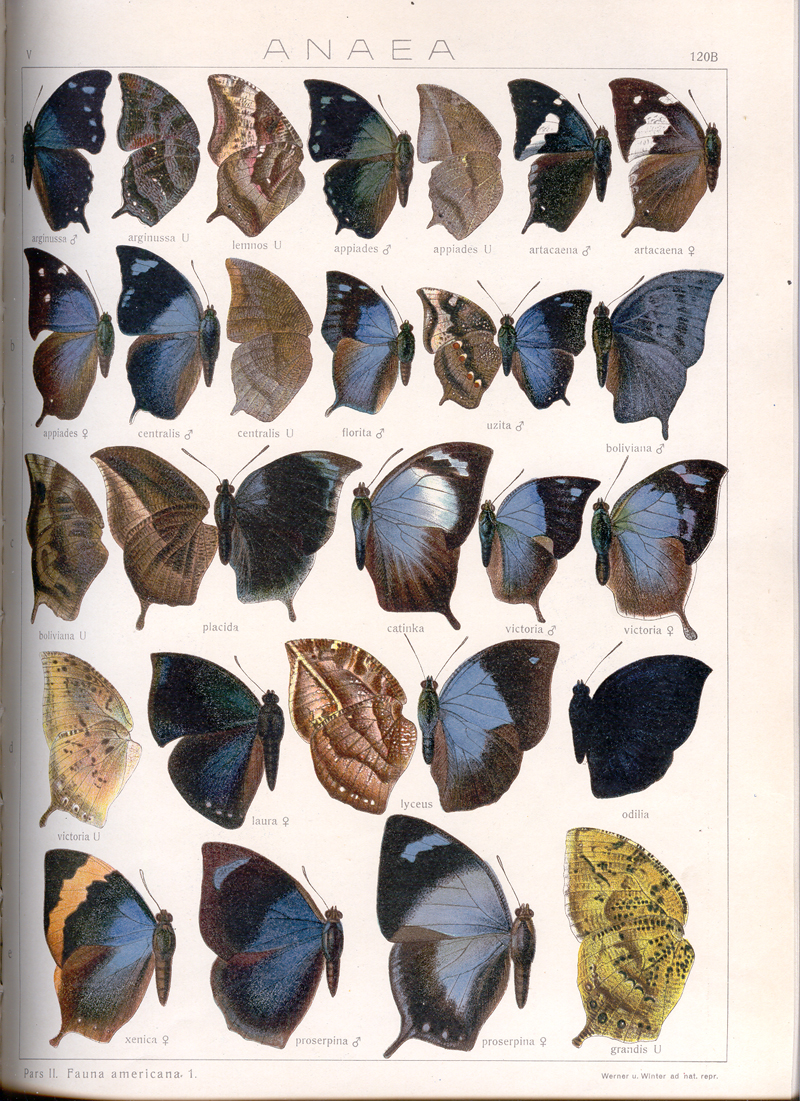

Scientific classification
- Kingdom: Animalia
- Phylum: Arthropoda
- Class: Insecta
- Order: Lepidoptera
- Family: Nymphalidae
- Tribe: Anaeini
- Genus: Memphis
- Species: M. grandis

Binomial name
- Memphis grandis (Druce, 1877)

= Memphis grandis =

Species of butterfly

Memphis grandis is a species of leafwing found in South America (Brazil and Guyana).

Memphis grandis is larger than the other Memphis It is a butterfly with forewings with a humped costal edge, an almost straight outer edge, a hook-like inner angle and a very concave inner edge. Each hindwing bears a club-shaped tail. The upper part is dark blue, almost black with a metallic blue basal part, or brown with a metallic yellow-green basal part. The underside is orange-yellow, light ochre marked with dark spots in the female, and simulates a dead leaf.Seitz- Large, upper surface almost exactly as in proserpina, broad and obtuse wings, with a short broad spatulate tail of the hindwing, the blue of the basal half the hindwing light and bright. The dirty sand-coloured, yellowish-brown under surface is irregularly irrorated in a sooty colour.
