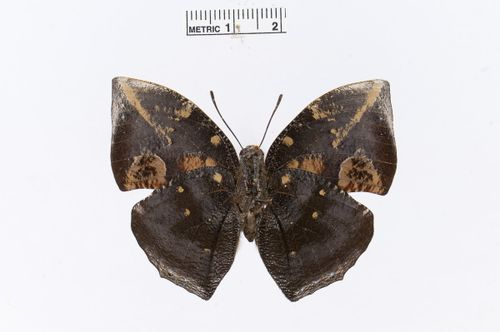

Scientific classification
- Kingdom: Animalia
- Phylum: Arthropoda
- Clade: Pancrustacea
- Class: Insecta
- Order: Lepidoptera
- Family: Nymphalidae
- Genus: Memphis
- Species: M. aureola

Binomial name
- Memphis aureola (Bates

= Memphis aureola =

Species of butterfly

Memphis aureola is a species of leafwing found in Mexico, Guatemala, Colombia, and Ecuador.

Memphis aureola is a butterfly with forewings that have a swollen costal border, an angular apex, a hooked inner angle, and a very concave inner edge. The hindwings may or may not each have a club-like tail. The upper side is brown, largely suffused with metallic bluish-green, and the forewings are crossed by a white band that separates the apex. The underside is brown suffused with silvery tones and simulates a dead leaf. A. aureola Bates (120 Db) from Guatemala, Panama (Lino, 800 m) and Colombia (Muzo 400 to 800 m, A. H. Fasst) vies with rosae in the beauty of the under surface. In the female being extraordinarily different, the broad white band of the upper surface of the forewing is noticed also beneath where it is distally broadened and blurred, on the whole yellowish and with single brown small spots; the hindwings exhibit 2 large and 3 small golden spots in the shape of a row being geniculated in the middle and turned towards the inner margin.
