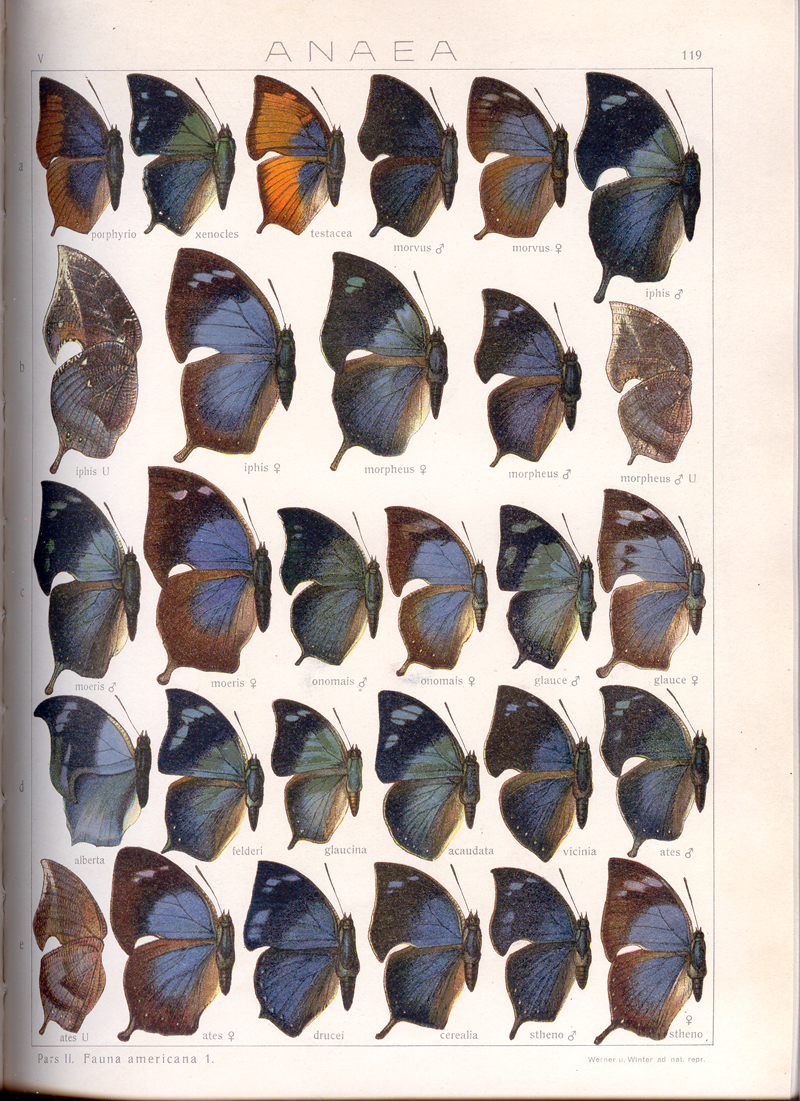

Scientific classification
- Kingdom: Animalia
- Phylum: Arthropoda
- Class: Insecta
- Order: Lepidoptera
- Family: Nymphalidae
- Tribe: Anaeini
- Genus: Memphis
- Species: M. alberta

Binomial name
- Memphis alberta (. Druce, 1876)

= Memphis alberta =

Species of butterfly

Memphis alberta is a species of leafwing found in South America.It is endemic to Peru Memphis alberta is a butterfly with forewings with a humped costal edge, a pointed hooked apex and a concave outer edge.The upper part is navy blue with a line of metallic blue spots on the forewings near the apex.The underside is brown mottled with black and simulates a dead leaf. Seitz- alberta has a glossy brown under surface with thick dark and light brown spots. Not known to us in nature. According to the figure, the forewings exhibit more distinctly the blue spots of the forewings which are in moeris continued from the apical district along the distal margin; the sickle of the inner angle is just as pronounced as in moeris but the hindwings have only a short tooth instead of the long spatulate tails.
