= Memphis cleomestra =

- in Hewitson's Illustrations of new species of exotic butterflies

Scientific classification
- Kingdom: Animalia
- Phylum: Arthropoda
- Clade: Pancrustacea
- Class: Insecta
- Order: Lepidoptera
- Family: Nymphalidae
- Tribe: Anaeini
- Genus: Memphis
- Species: M. cleomestra

Binomial name
- Memphis cleomestra (Hewitson, 1869)

Species of butterfly

Memphis cleomestra is a species of leafwing found in South America (Panama, Costa Rica, Guatemala, and Colombia).

== Subspecies ==
- Memphis cleomestra cleomestra; present in Colombia
- Memphis cleomestra ada (Butler, 1875)

== Description ==
Memphis cleomestra is a butterfly with forewings with a humped costal edge, pointed apex, concave outer edge near the apex, hook-shaped inner angle, concave inner edge and hindwings with or without a tail. The upper side of the wings is black, with a light metallic blue basal part on the forewings and a marginal band extending to separate the tip of the apex formed by metallic light blue spots; on the hindwings forms a band from the base to the outer edge near the anal angle and joins a metallic light blue marginal band. The underside is brown with grey, green and metallic purple reflections and simulates a dead leaf.Seitz- The hindwings are tailed and the inner margin of the forewings deeply sinuate. On the blackish-brown ground there is across the forewing and hindwing a broad blue band before which there are also two blue subapical spots. The under surface is very plain, yellowish-grey with yellowish and blackish, small strokes.

== Biology ==
The host plants of its caterpillar are Piper.
