= Memphis hirta =

Scientific classification
- Kingdom: Animalia
- Phylum: Arthropoda
- Class: Insecta
- Order: Lepidoptera
- Family: Nymphalidae
- Tribe: Anaeini
- Genus: Memphis
- Species: M. hirta

Binomial name
- Memphis hirta (Weymer, 1907)

Synonyms
- Anaea hirta Weymer, 1907; Anaea purpurata Witt, 1972

Species of butterfly

Memphis hirta is a species of leafwing found in South America.It is endemic to Brazil. Memphis hirta is a butterfly with forewings with a humped costal edge, hook-like inner angle and concave inner edge. Each hindwing has a tail.The upper side is red with the apex and the band along the outer edge on the forewings blackened or purple. There is a slight metallic blue suffusion from the basal part of the forewings.The underside is brown dotted with dark brown and simulates a dead leaf..
