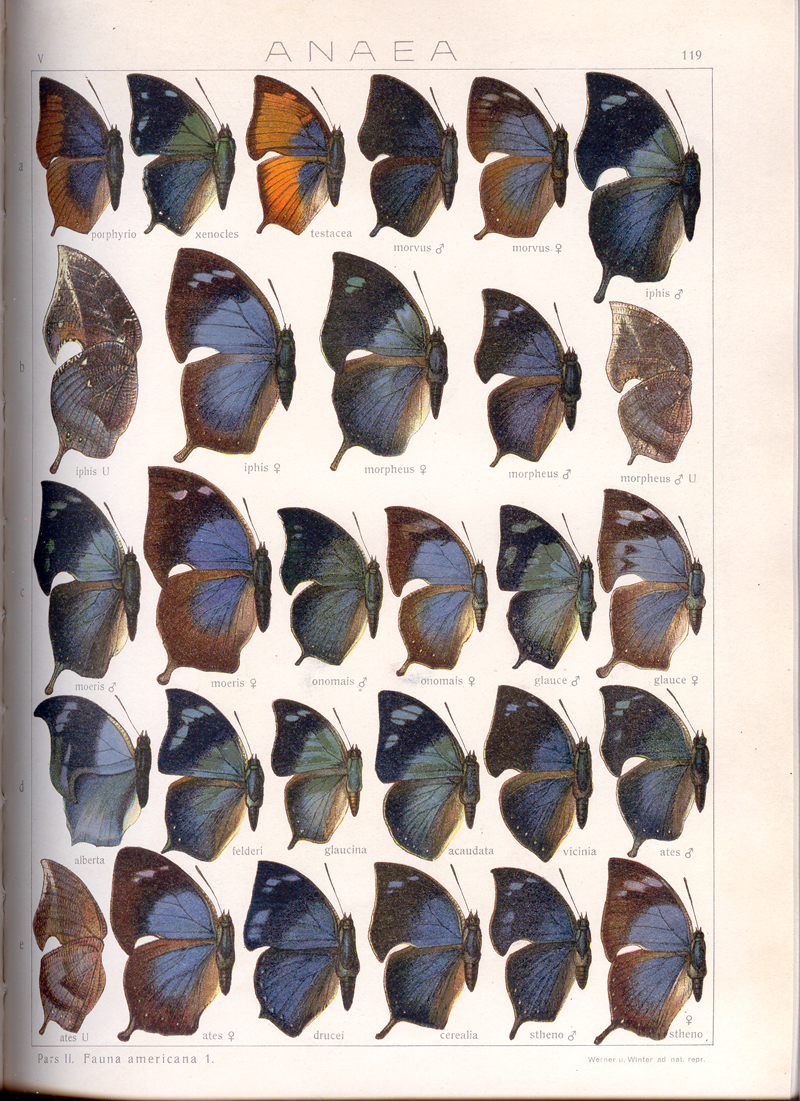

Scientific classification
- Kingdom: Animalia
- Phylum: Arthropoda
- Class: Insecta
- Order: Lepidoptera
- Family: Nymphalidae
- Tribe: Anaeini
- Genus: Memphis
- Species: M. cerealia

Binomial name
- Memphis cerealia (Druce, 1877)

= Memphis cerealia =

Species of butterfly

Memphis cerealia is a species of leafwing found in South America. It is endemic to Peru.

Memphis cerealia is a leaf-winged butterfly with a humped costal edge, a concave outer edge near the apex, a hook-like inner angle, and a concave inner edge. Each hindwing bears a tail.The upper part is navy blue, almost black, or with a metallic blue-green basal part.The underside is brown and grey and simulates a dead leaf.Seitz- Instead of green the marking of the upper surface seems to be just as often dark blue. Resembles extremely [ates memphis] (C. & R. Felder, 1867)
