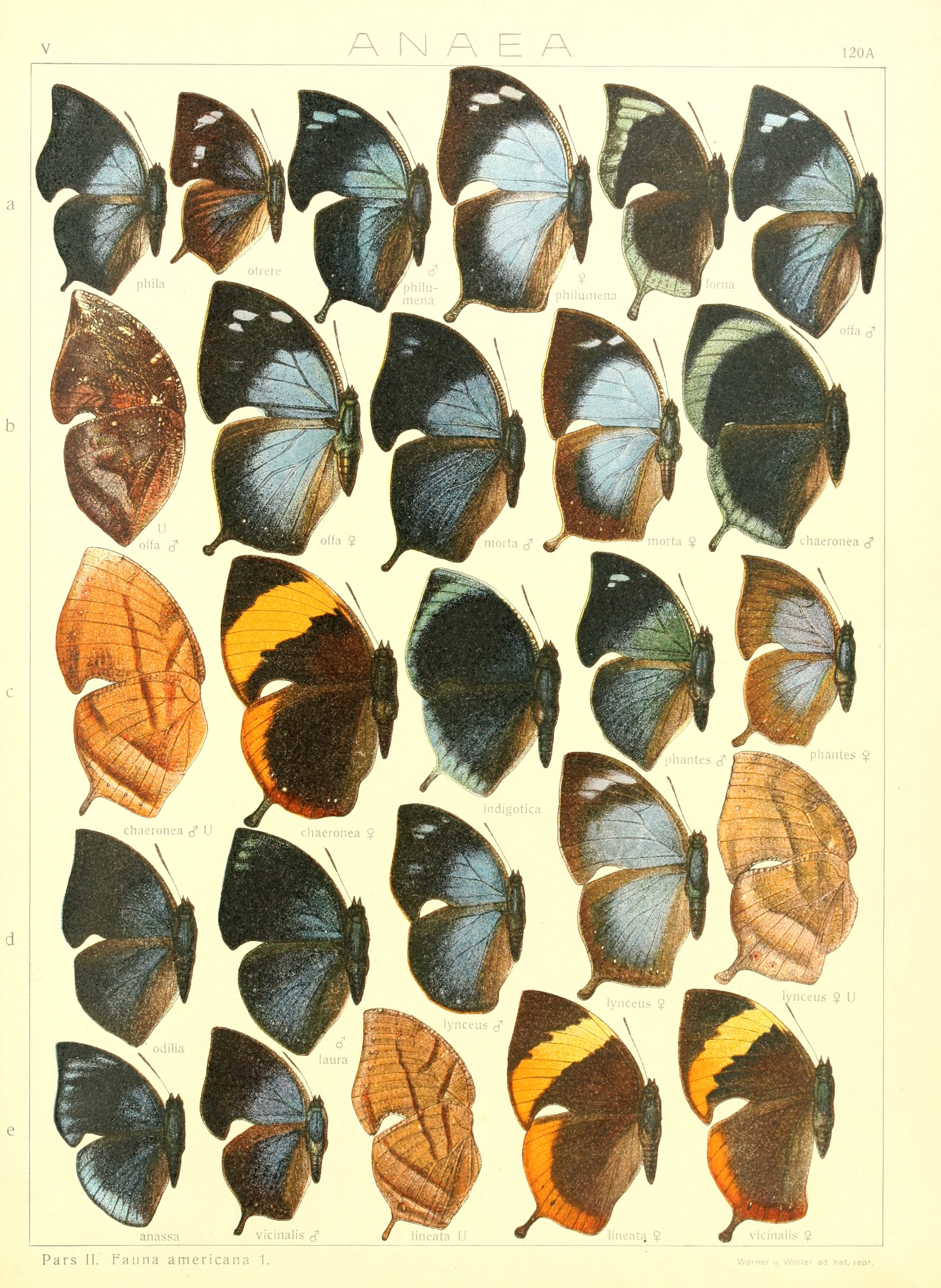

Scientific classification
- Kingdom: Animalia
- Phylum: Arthropoda
- Class: Insecta
- Order: Lepidoptera
- Family: Nymphalidae
- Genus: Memphis
- Species: M. offa

Binomial name
- Memphis offa (Druce, 1877)

= Memphis offa =

Species of butterfly

Memphis offa is a species of leafwing found in South America.

== Subspecies ==
- Memphis offa offa, present in Ecuador, Bolivia, and Peru.
- Memphis offa gudrun (Niepelt, 1924), present in Colombia and Peru.

== Description ==
Memphis offa is a butterfly that exhibits sexual dimorphism, with both sexes having a humped costal edge, a hook-like internal angle, and a concave inner edge. The upper part of the male is dark blue with a metallic blue basal part while that of the female is brown discreetly suffused with blue.The distal spot before the apex is double and there is also a diffuse spot before the middle of the border of the forewing. The male's underside is dark brown, the female's is yellow, both mimic a dead leaf.
