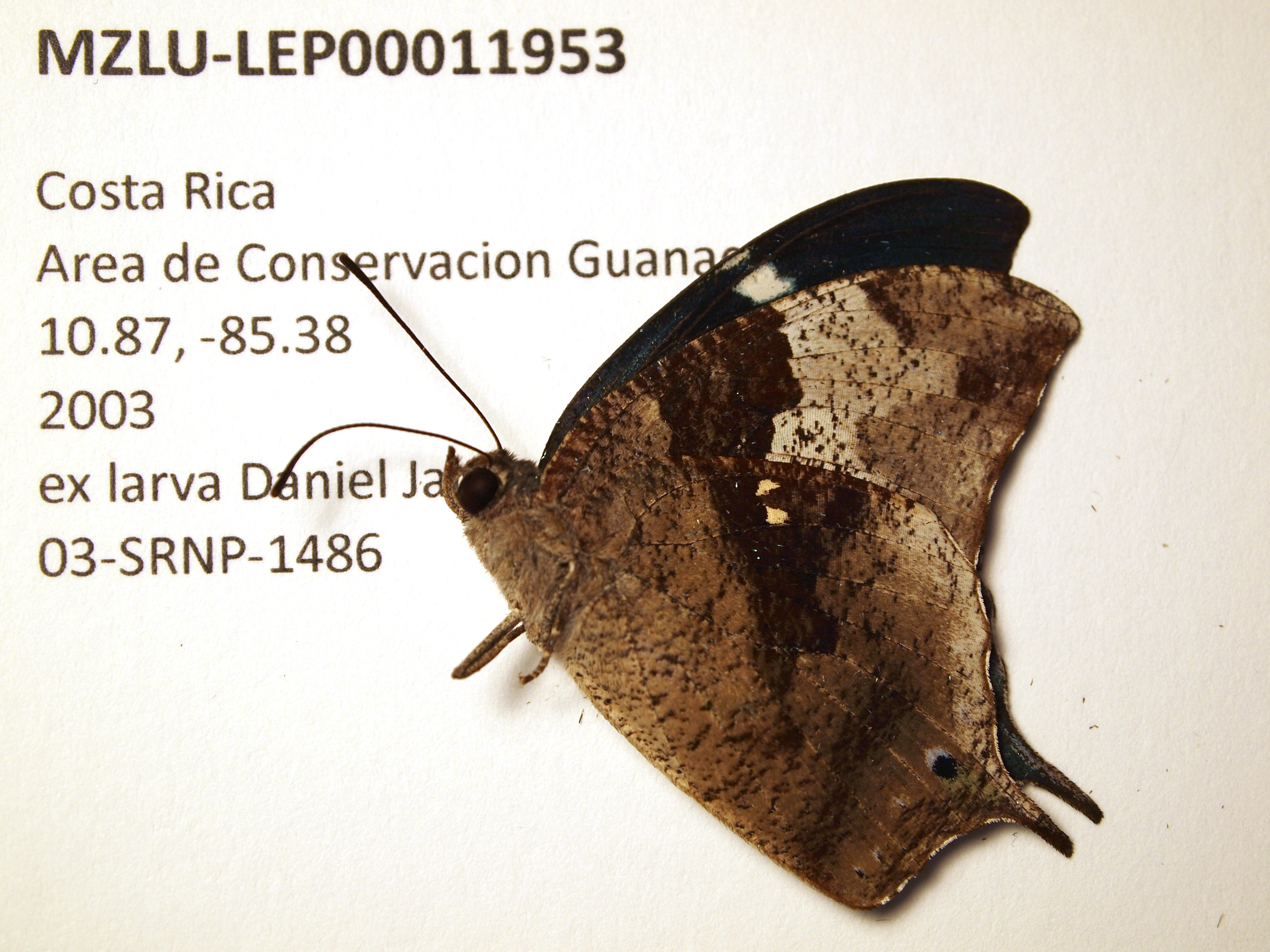

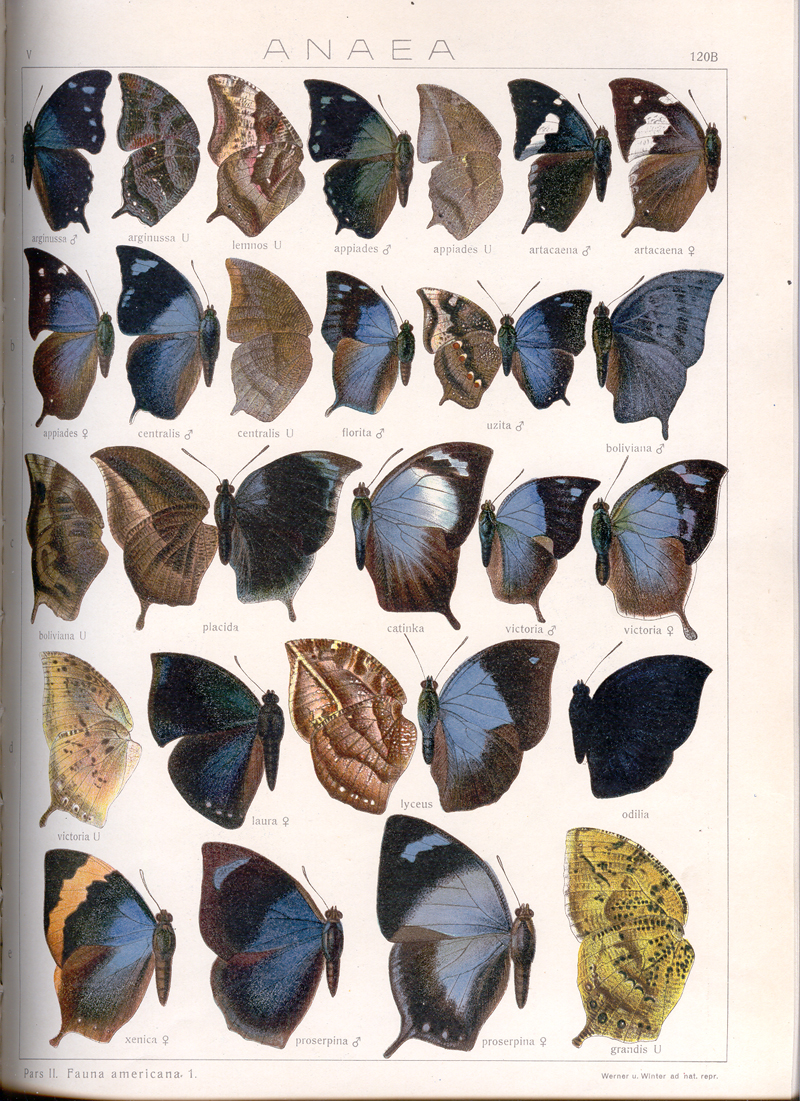

Scientific classification
- Kingdom: Animalia
- Phylum: Arthropoda
- Class: Insecta
- Order: Lepidoptera
- Family: Nymphalidae
- Genus: Memphis
- Species: M. artacaena

Binomial name
- Memphis artacaena (Hewitson, 1869)

= Memphis artacaena =

Species of butterfly

Memphis artacaena is a species of leafwing found in South America (Mexico, Costa Rica, and Colombia).

== Description ==
Memphis artacaena is a butterfly with forewings and a humped costal edge, an almost straight outer edge, a concave inner edge and a tailed hind wing. The upper side of the forewings is partly brown, with a metallic light blue-green basal part separated by a band of contiguous white spots. The upper side of the hindwings is light brown with a blue suffusion in the basal part. The reverse side is pearly white decorated with a more or less tight dotted line of small reddish-brown or black dots and simulates a dead leaf.Seitz- A. artacaena Hew. (120 B a) is distributed all over Central America as far as Colombia, but everywhere very rare. Both sexes possess a white band of the forewing being pierced behind the cellule, whereby the species is at once recognizable. It is also - beneath distinguished by a light tinge which strongly contrasts with the dark proximal part of the forewing.

== Biology ==
The host plant of its caterpillar is a Croton, Croton schiedeanus.
