= Memphis herbacea =

Scientific classification
- Kingdom: Animalia
- Phylum: Arthropoda
- Class: Insecta
- Order: Lepidoptera
- Family: Nymphalidae
- Tribe: Anaeini
- Genus: Memphis
- Species: M. herbacea

Binomial name
- Memphis herbacea (Butler & Druce, 1872)

Species of butterfly

Memphis herbacea is a species of leafwing found in South America (Mexico and Costa Rica).

Memphis herbacea is a butterfly with forewings with a humped costal edge, slightly concave outer edge, very concave inner edge. The upper part is dark blue or dark brown with a broad metallic turquoise blue basal part and two white or light blue spots on the forewings near the apex. The underside is brown covered with pearly white and simulates a dead leaf.Seitz- The basal part of all the wings is green and less extensive; except a green subapical spot and 3 white dots at the distal margin of the hindwings, the upper surface has no marking. The under surface essentially corresponds with glauce.
