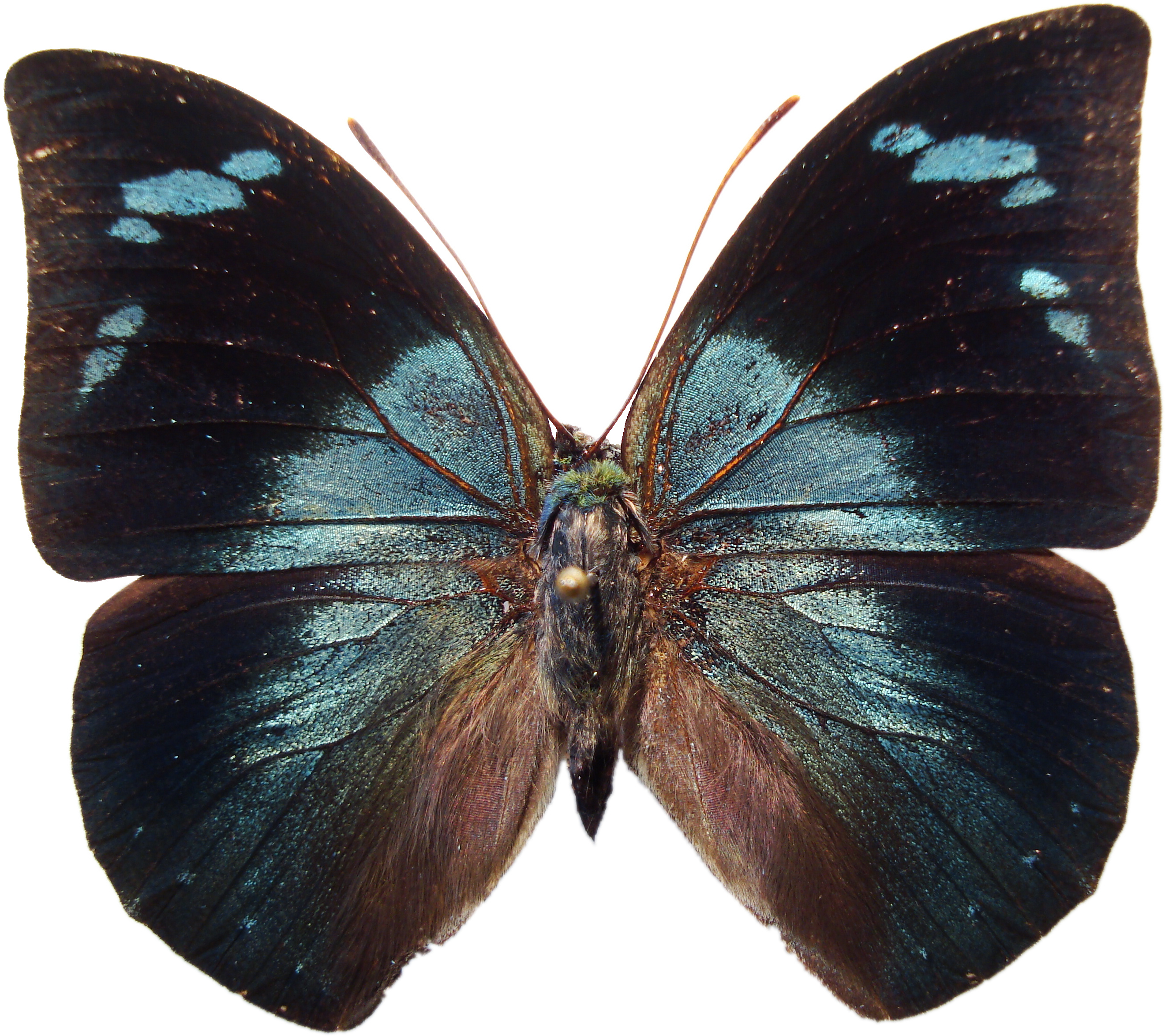
- Specimen from Rio Zongo, Bolivia

Scientific classification
- Kingdom: Animalia
- Phylum: Arthropoda
- Clade: Pancrustacea
- Class: Insecta
- Order: Lepidoptera
- Family: Nymphalidae
- Tribe: Anaeini
- Genus: Memphis
- Species: M. praxias

Binomial name
- Memphis praxias (Hopffer, 1874)

= Memphis praxias =

Species of butterfly

Memphis praxias is a species of leafwing found in South America (Ecuador, Peru, and Bolivia).

Memphis praxias is a butterfly with forewings with a humped costal edge, pointed apex, concave outer edge. The upper part is navy blue, almost black, with a metallic blue basal part. The underside is brown mottled with grey and simulates a dead leaf. It is somewhat larger than Memphis glauce with the same colouring, but only one plain little apical spot of the forewings below which there is sometimes another small blue spot parted by a vein, before the middle of the distal margin. Hindwing without tail or tooth.
