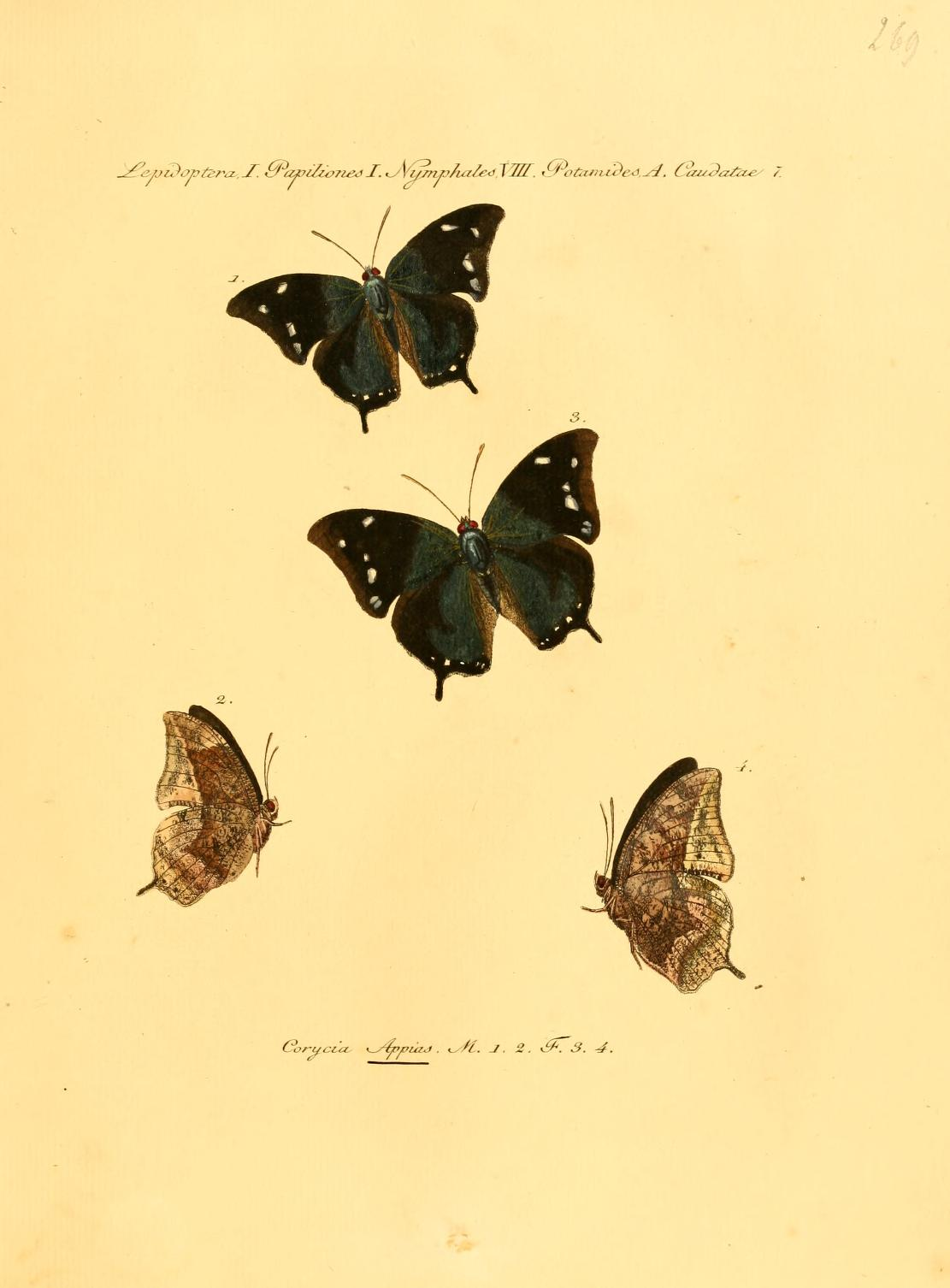
- Plate accompanying the original description in Hübner's Sammlung exotischer Schmetterlinge

Scientific classification
- Kingdom: Animalia
- Phylum: Arthropoda
- Clade: Pancrustacea
- Class: Insecta
- Order: Lepidoptera
- Family: Nymphalidae
- Tribe: Anaeini
- Genus: Memphis
- Species: M. appias

Binomial name
- Memphis appias (Hübner, [1825])

= Memphis appias =

Species of butterfly

Memphis appias is a species of leafwing found in South America (Colombia and Brazil).

Memphis appias is a butterfly with forewings with a humped costal edge, hook-shaped apex, concave outer edge, concave inner edge and hindwings with a tail. There is sexual dimorphism of colour. The upper part of the male is brown with the basal part of the forewings metallic blue, some white spots and the hindwings suffused with metallic blue with a submarginal line of small white dots. The upper part of the female is golden brown with the same ornamentation of white spots. The reverse is beige and simulates a dead leaf.
