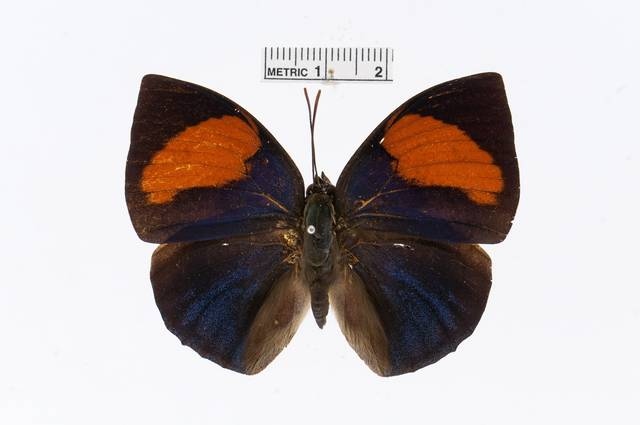

Scientific classification
- Kingdom: Animalia
- Phylum: Arthropoda
- Class: Insecta
- Order: Lepidoptera
- Family: Nymphalidae
- Genus: Memphis
- Species: M. anna

Binomial name
- Memphis anna (Staudinger, 1897)

= Memphis anna =

Species of butterfly

Memphis anna is a species of leafwing found in Colombia, Ecuador, Brazil, and Peru.

Memphis anna is a butterfly with forewings with a humped costa and angular apex. The upper side is almost black with the forewings barred by an orange or red band that separates the apex. The underside is reddish-brown with a black basal part and simulates a dead leaf.A. anna Stgr. (120 Cd) is nearly allied to the preceding species [Memphis anna elina then species now subspecies], as is shown by the figures. It comes from the Upper Amazon and is known only in few specimens. The orange-yellow spot of the forewing of elina is in anna scarlet and the hindwing does not exhibit a circumscribed lustrous spot, but is covered in the disk with a duller blue reflection.

== Subspecies ==
- Memphis anna anna
- Memphis anna elina Staudinger, 1897)
