= Memphis xenippa =

Scientific classification
- Kingdom: Animalia
- Phylum: Arthropoda
- Class: Insecta
- Order: Lepidoptera
- Family: Nymphalidae
- Tribe: Anaeini
- Genus: Memphis
- Species: M. xenippa

Binomial name
- Memphis xenippa (Hall, 1935)

Synonyms
- Anaea xenippa; Memphis xenocles xenippa

Species of butterfly

Memphis xenippa is a species of leafwing found in South America. It is endemic to Colombia.

Memphis xenippa is a butterfly with forewings with a humped costal edge, a slightly concave outer edge and hind wings each with a tail. The upper side is black with an ornamentation of blue spots, in a marginal line on the hind wings, in a line of five large blue spots from the costal margin to the outer edge and then to the inner corner. The reverse is brown with silver mottles.
