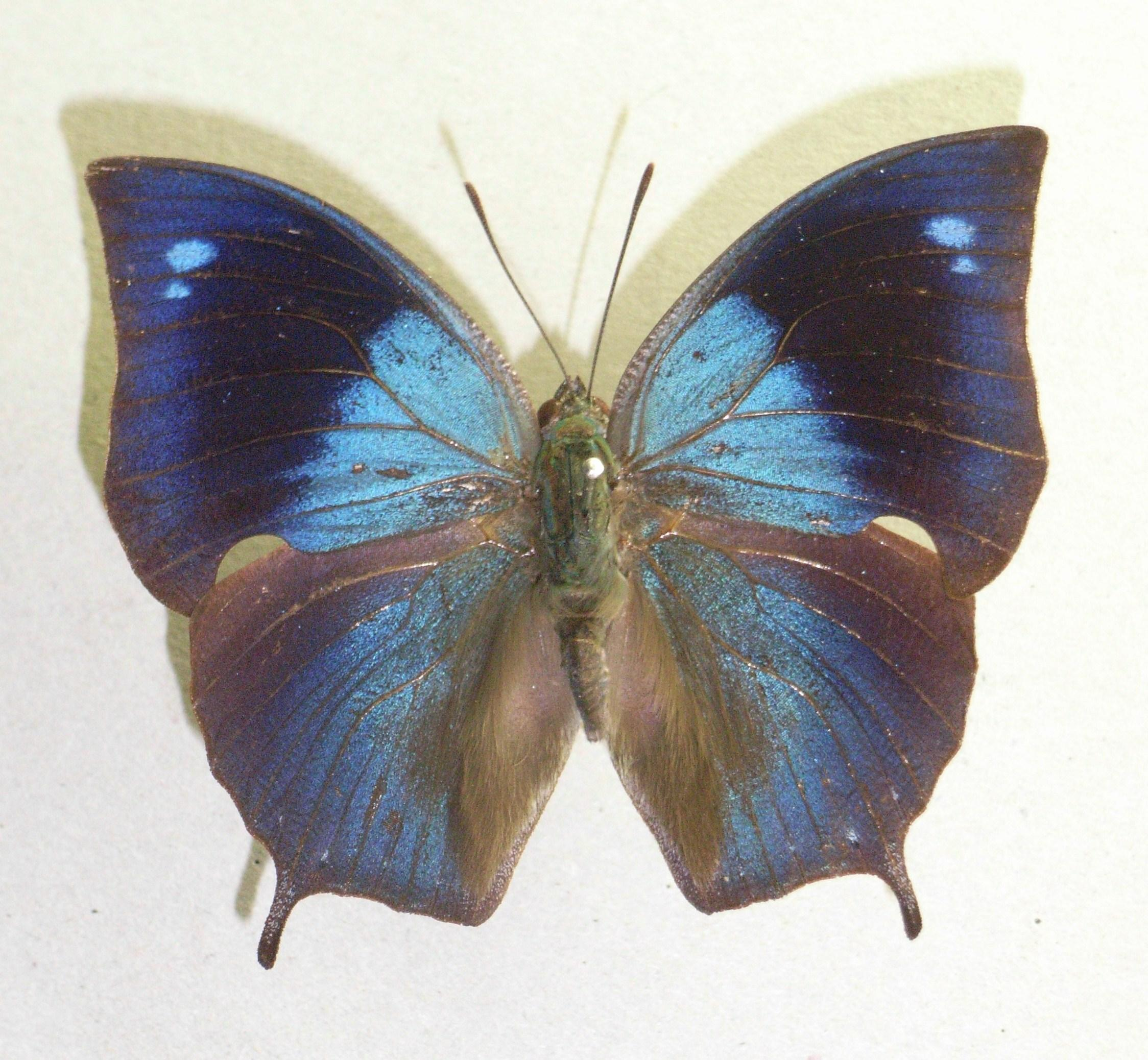
- Memphis moruus

Scientific classification
- Kingdom: Animalia
- Phylum: Arthropoda
- Clade: Pancrustacea
- Class: Insecta
- Order: Lepidoptera
- Family: Nymphalidae
- Subfamily: Charaxinae
- Tribe: Anaeini
- Genus: Memphis; Hübner, [1819]

Species
- Many, see text

Synonyms
- Corycia Hübner, [1825]; Cymatogramma Doubleday, [1849]; Cymatogramma Westwood, [1850]; Rydonia Salazar & Constantino, 2001; Annagrapha Salazar & Constantino, 2001; Anaea

= Memphis (butterfly) =

Genus of butterflies

Memphis, described by Jacob Hübner in 1819, is a Neotropical nymphalid butterfly genus in the subfamily Charaxinae.

There are 61 species in the genus. All are Neotropical and the undersides of the wings closely resemble dead leaves. In the past Memphis was considered a subgenus of Anaea.

== Species ==
Listed alphabetically within groups:

Species group pasibula:

- Memphis pasibula (Doubleday, [1849])
- Memphis falcata (Hopffer, 1874)

Species group aureola:

- Memphis anna (Staudinger, 1897)
- Memphis aureola (Bates, 1866)
- Memphis dia (Godman & Salvin, [1884])
- Memphis polyxo (H. Druce, 1874)

Species group verticordia:

- Memphis artacaena (Hewitson, 1869) – white-patched leafwing
- Memphis perenna (Godman & Salvin, [1884]) – big-spotted leafwing
- ?Memphis pleione (Godart, 1819)
- Memphis verticordia (Hübner, 1824)

Species group arginussa:

- Memphis arginussa (Geyer, 1832) – mottled leafwing
- Memphis herbacea (Butler & H. Druce, 1872) – scarce leafwing
- Memphis lemnos (H. Druce, 1877)
- Memphis pithyusa (R. Felder, 1869) – blue leafwing, pale-spotted leafwing

Species group hedemanni:

- Memphis acaudata (Röber, 1916)
- Memphis hedemanni (R. Felder, 1869) – double-banded leafwing
- Memphis praxias (Hopffer, 1874)

Species group glauce:

- Memphis glauce (C. Felder & R. Felder, 1862)

Species group appias:

- Memphis appias (Hübner, [1825])
- Memphis xenippa (Hall, 1935)
- Memphis xenocles (Westwood, 1850) – corner-spotted leafwing

Species group polycarmes:

- Memphis ambrosia (H. Druce, 1874)
- Memphis anassa (C. Felder & R. Felder, 1862)
- Memphis aulica (Röber, 1916)
- Memphis basilia (Stoll, [1780])
- Memphis cleomestra (Hewitson, 1869)
- Memphis forreri (Godman & Salvin, [1884]) – Guatemalan leafwing
- Memphis grandis (H. Druce, 1877)
- Memphis laura (H. Druce, 1877)
- Memphis lineata (Salvin, 1869)
- Memphis lyceus (H. Druce, 1877)
- Memphis mora (H. Druce, 1874)
- Memphis nenia (H. Druce, 1877)
- Memphis offa (H. Druce, 1877)
- Memphis phantes (Hopffer, 1874)
- Memphis polycarmes (Fabricius, 1775)
- Memphis proserpina (Salvin, 1869) – great leafwing

Species group moruus:

- Memphis moruus (Fabricius, 1775) – laurel leafwing
- Memphis oenomais (Boisduval, 1870) – Boisduval's leafwing
- Memphis philumena (Doubleday, [1849]) – orange-striped leafwing

Species group eribotes:

- Memphis acidalia (Hübner, [1819])
- Memphis beatrix (H. Druce, 1874)
- Memphis catinka (H. Druce, 1877)
- Memphis hirta (Weymer, 1907)
- Memphis laertes (Cramer, [1775])
- Memphis leonida (Stoll, [1782])
- Memphis otrere (Hübner, 1825)
- Memphis pseudiphis (Staudinger, 1887)

Species group iphis:

- Memphis alberta (H. Druce, 1876)
- Memphis boliviana (H. Druce, 1877)
- Memphis cerealia (H. Druce, 1877)
- Memphis cluvia (Hopffer, 1874)
- Memphis iphis (Latreille, [1813])
- Memphis lorna (H. Druce, 1877)
- Memphis moeris (C. Felder & R. Felder, [1867])

Ungrouped:

- Memphis eurypyle C. Felder & R. Felder, 1862 – pointed leafwing
- Memphis juliani Constantino, 1999
- Memphis maria Pyrcz & Neild, 1996
- Memphis montesino Pyrcz, 1995
- Memphis neidhoeferi (Rotger, Escalante, & Coronado, 1965) – wavy-edged leafwing
- Memphis salinasi Pyrcz, 1993
- Memphis viloriae Pyrcz & Neild, 1996
- Memphis wellingi (Miller & Miller, 1976)

== Gallery ==
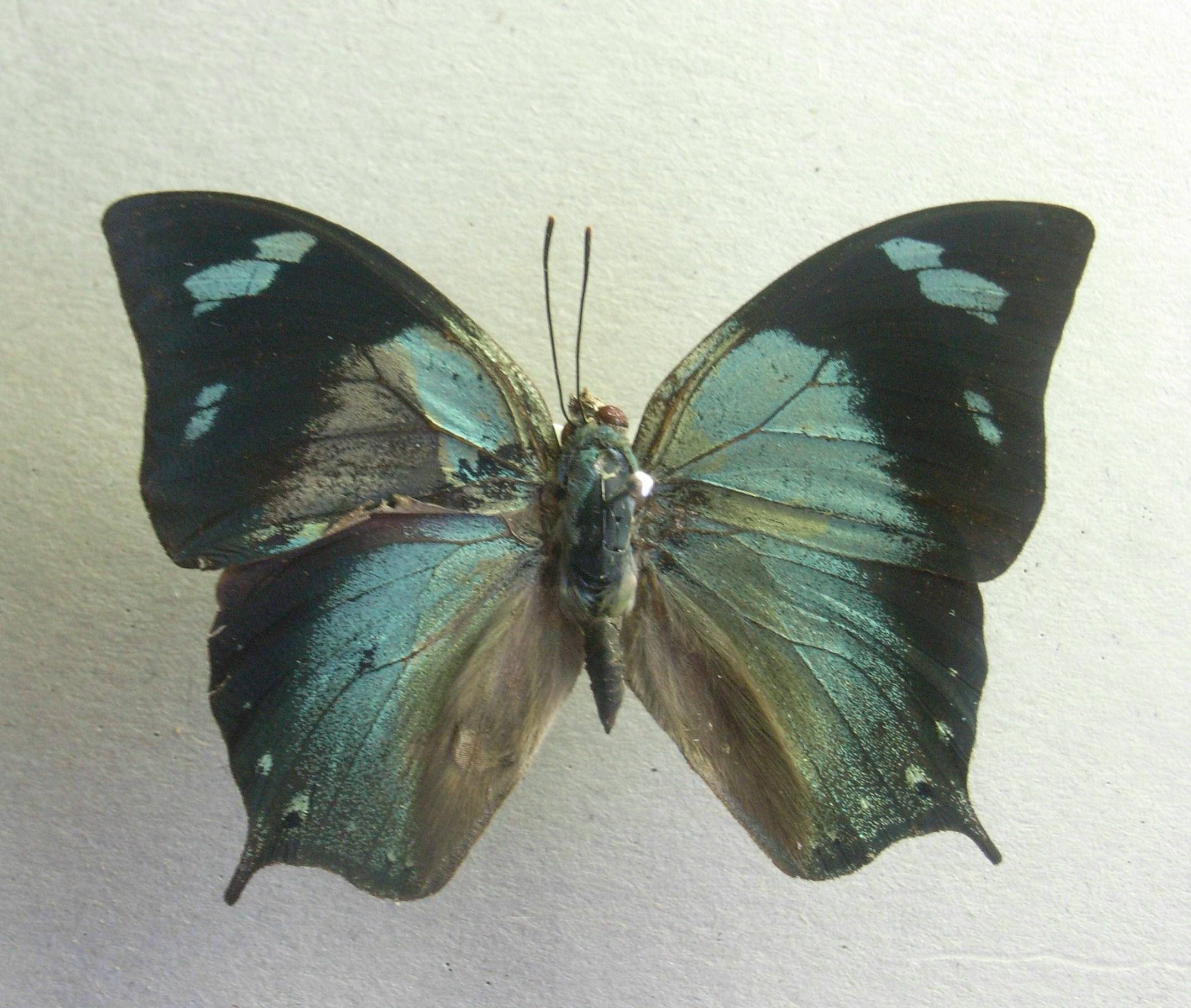
Memphis glauce

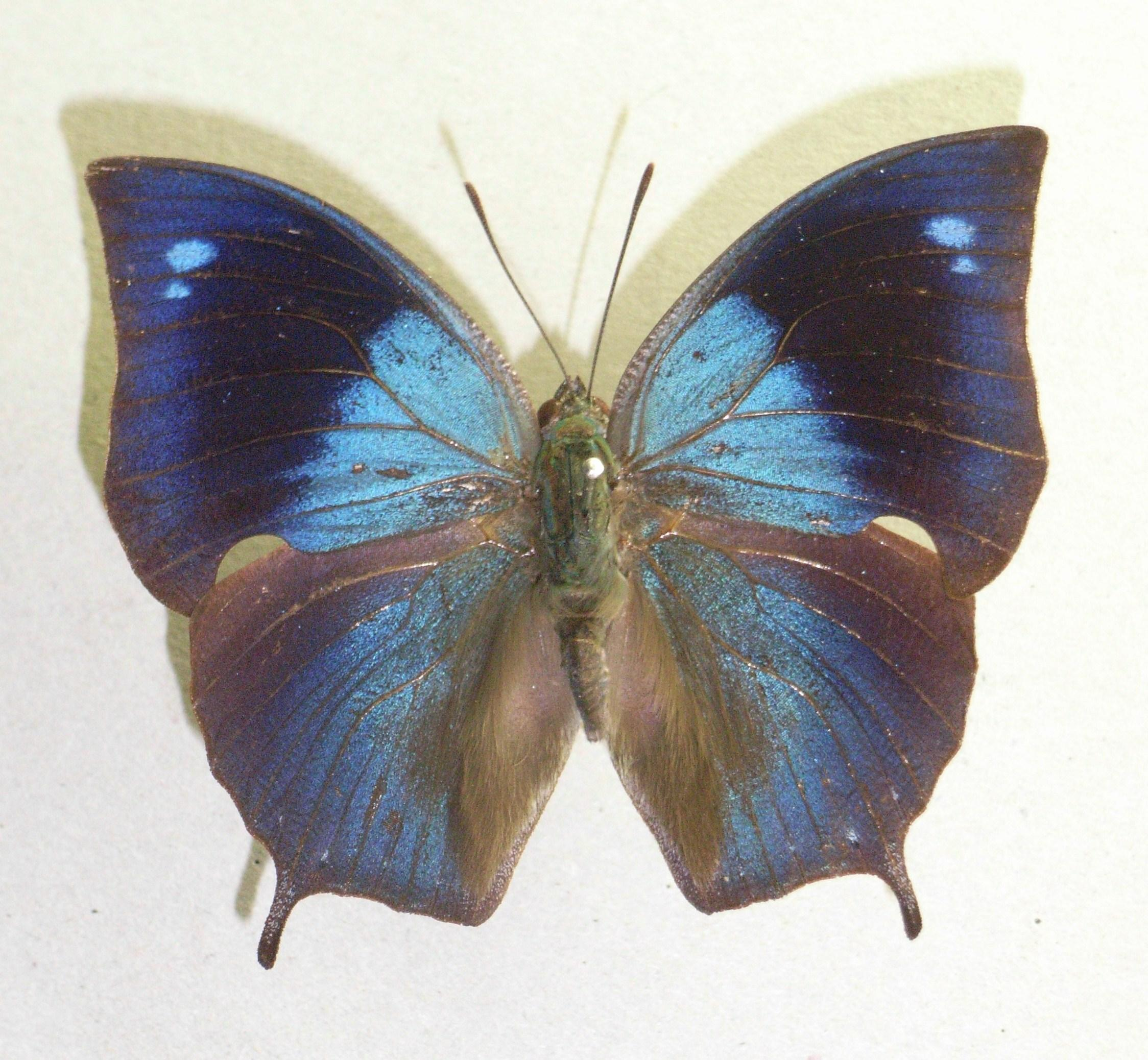
*Memphis moruus

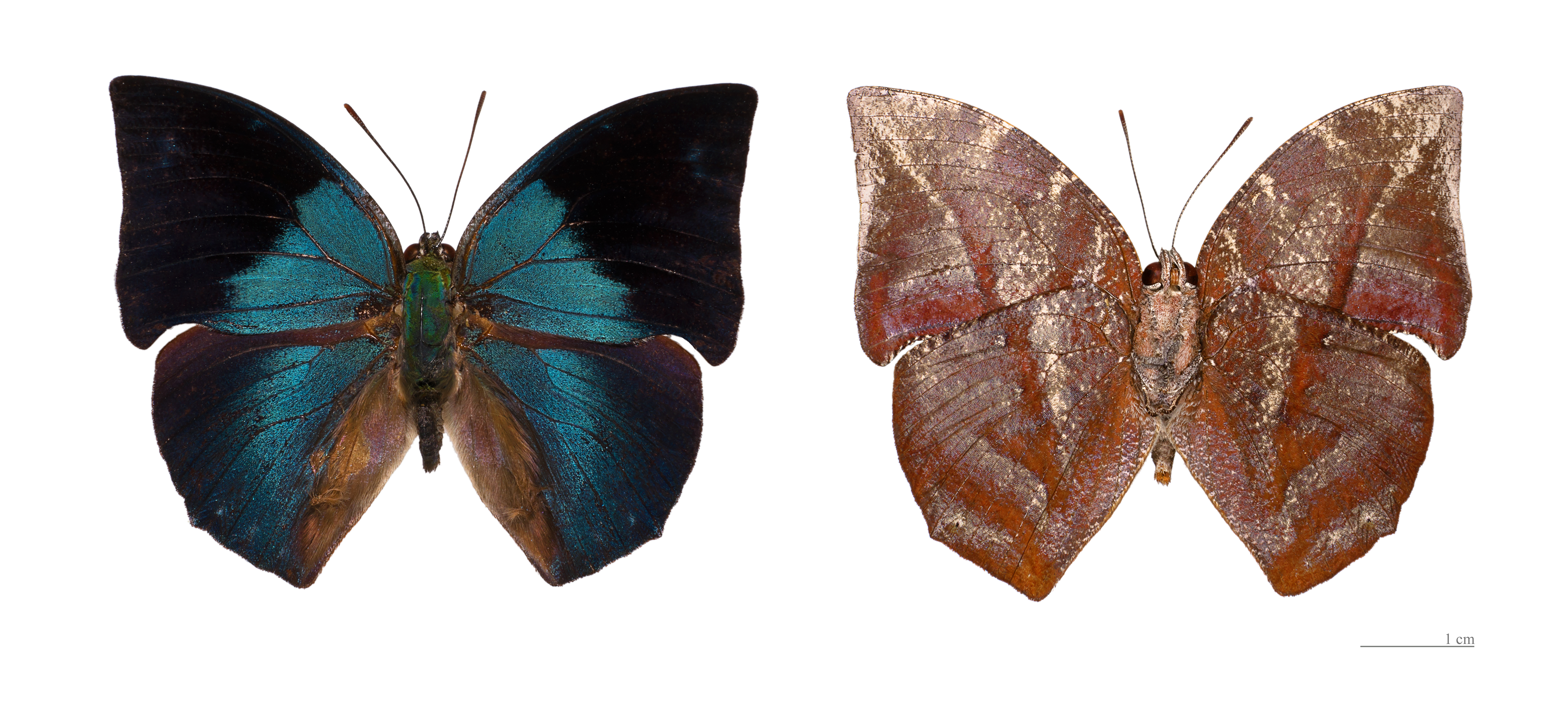
Memphis phantes - MHNT

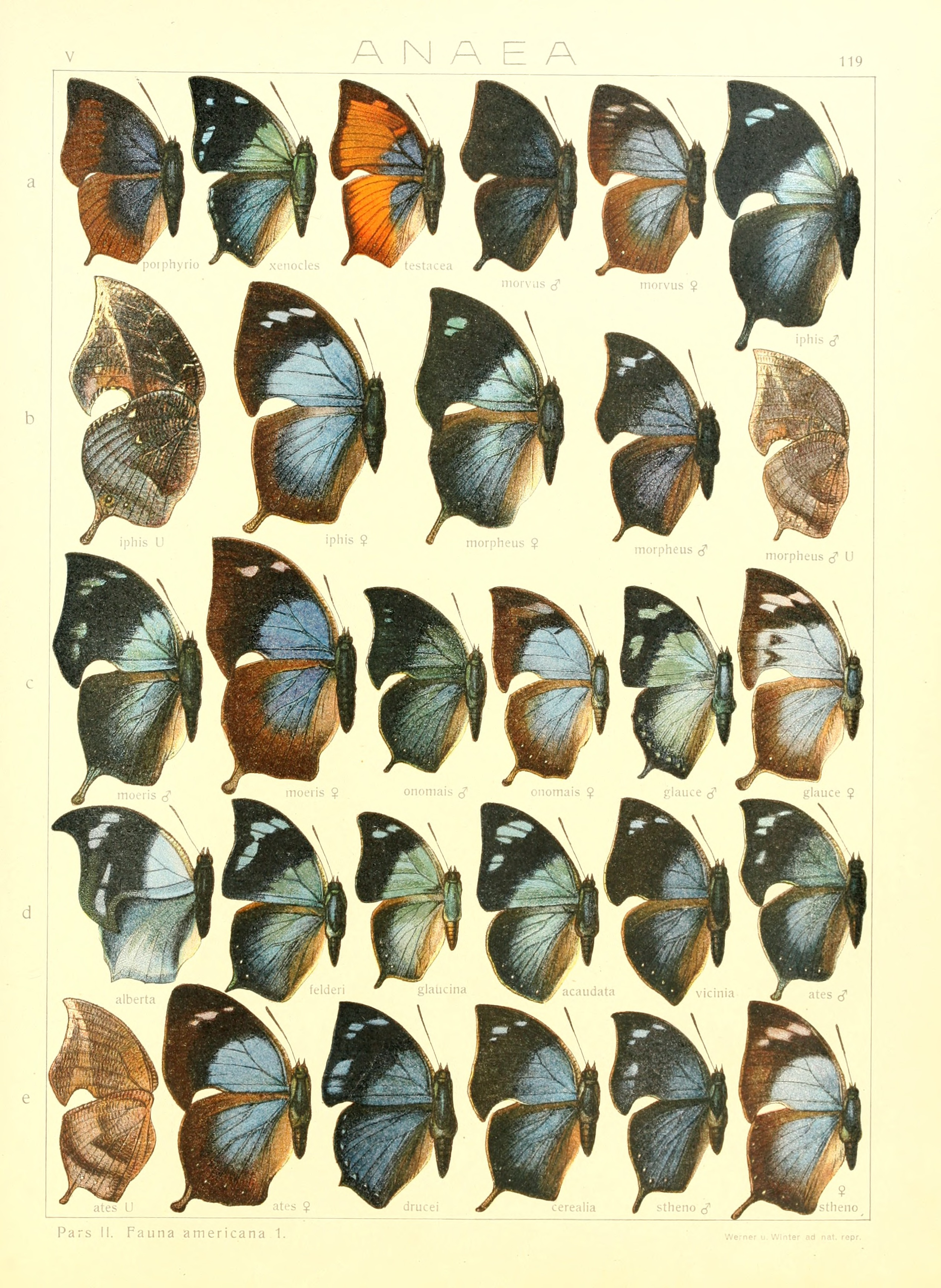

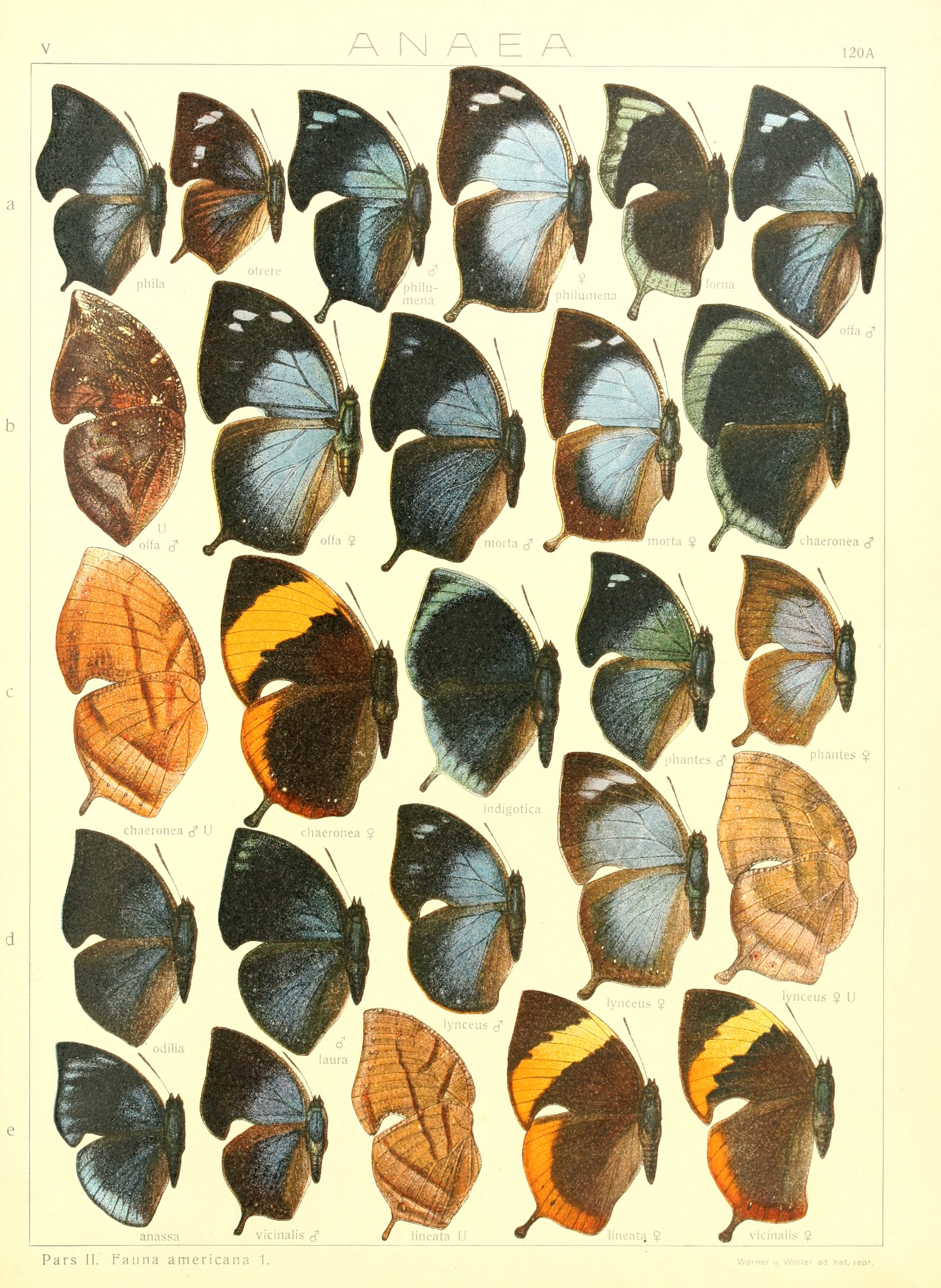
