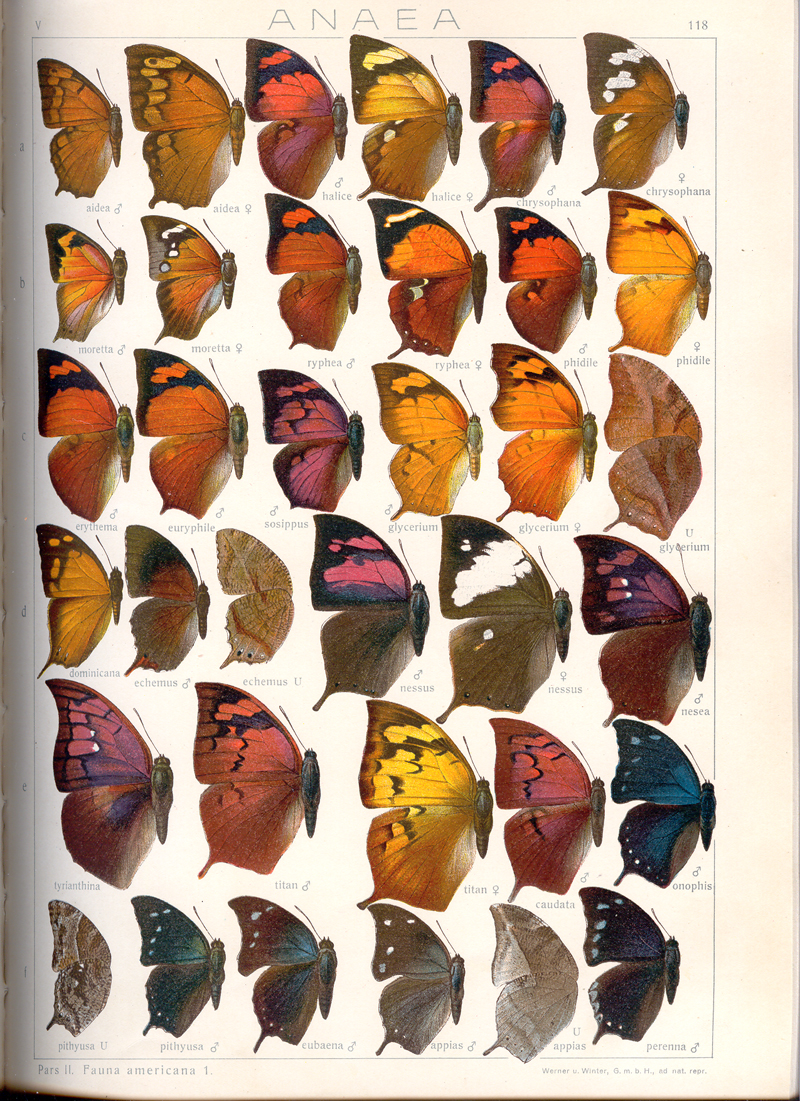

Scientific classification
- Kingdom: Animalia
- Phylum: Arthropoda
- Class: Insecta
- Order: Lepidoptera
- Family: Nymphalidae
- Tribe: Anaeini
- Genus: Memphis
- Species: M. perenna

Binomial name
- Memphis perenna (Godman & Salvin, [1884])

= Memphis perenna =

Species of butterfly

Memphis perenna is a species of leafwing found in South America.

Memphis perenna is a butterfly with forewings with a humped costal edge, concave outer edge, hooked inner angle and concave inner edge. Each hindwing bears a tail. The east upper side of the forewings is navy blue with a submarginal line of large metallic blue spots, the upper side of the hindwings is brown with a submarginal line of small metallic blue spots. The reverse side is brown with metallic reflections and simulates a dead leaf. Seitz -differs from all the species of this group by the blue marginal marking of the hindwings.

== Subspecies ==
- Memphis perenna perenna Guatemala.
- Memphis perenna austrina (Comstock, 1961) Colombia and Venezuela.
- Memphis perenna lankesteri (Hall, 1935) Costa Rica.

It is also present in Mexico and Salvador.
