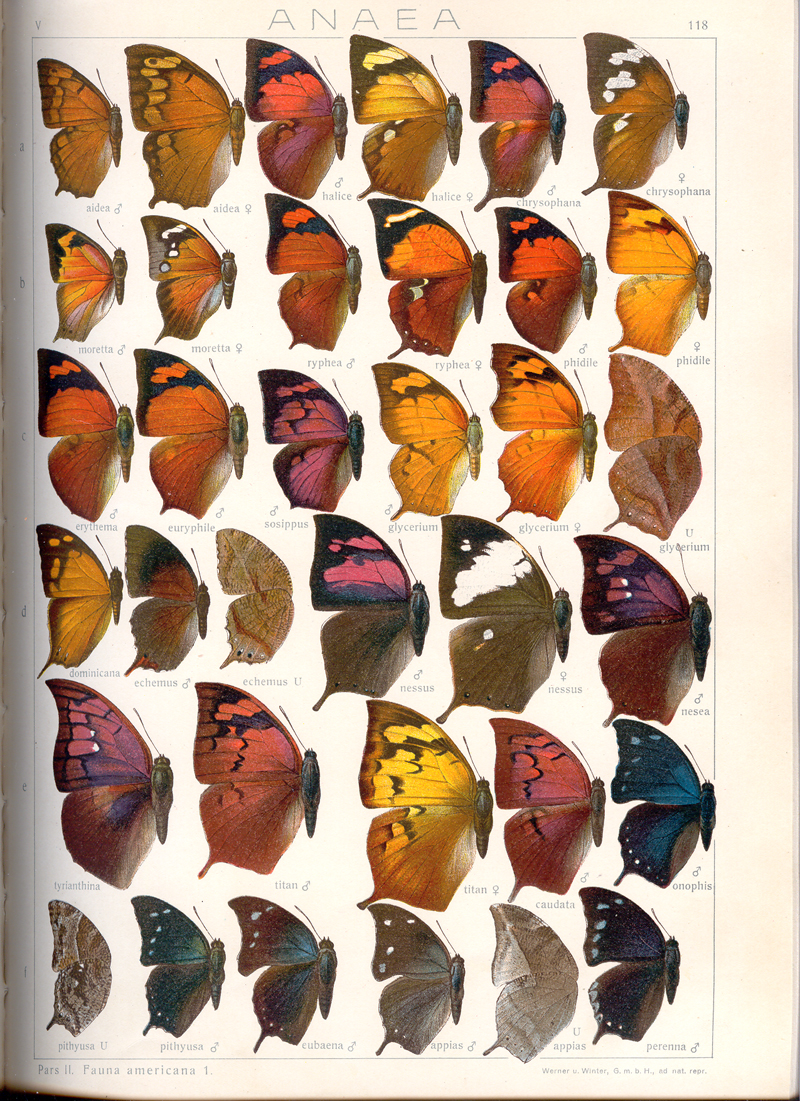
- dominicana and echemus in Seitz Macrolepidoptera of the World.

Scientific classification
- Kingdom: Animalia
- Phylum: Arthropoda
- Clade: Pancrustacea
- Class: Insecta
- Order: Lepidoptera
- Family: Nymphalidae
- Genus: Memphis
- Species: M. verticordia

Binomial name
- Memphis verticordia (Hübner, 1824)

= Memphis verticordia =

Species of butterfly

Memphis verticordia is a species of leafwing brush-footed butterfly found in the Caribbean, specifically the island of Hispanola. However, allied forms from other Caribbean islands have been treated as additional subspecies by several authors.

== Description ==
Memphis verticordia (Hübner, 1824) is an apparently unmistakable butterfly in Haiti & the Dominican Republic, being found in a few localities only in the southwest part of the island of Hispaniola. Their forewings have a humped costal edge and hindwings with a pointed tail. The outer margins of the forewings and hindwings are inconspicuously scalloped. The upper side is orange to brown depending on the subspecies, with the apex on the forewings and the brown submarginal area decorated with large yellow spots. The reverse side is mottled with brown and pearly white and simulates a dead leaf. Following Godman and Salvin (1884), the Hispanolan verticordia was said to differ from dominicana (from the Island of Dominica) chiefly by the absence of the yellow spots near the inner angle of the forewings (Röber, 1916, p.583). Due to their strong similarity, later authors considered them both forms the same species, alongside others.

The lineage can include:

- Memphis verticordia verticordia (Hübner, 1824) – Haiti, Dominican Republic

Possibly also:

- Memphis verticordia bahamae (Witt, 1972) – Bahamas
- Memphis verticordia danieliana (Witt, 1972) – Cayman Islands
- Memphis verticordia dominicana (Godman & Salvin, 1884) – Dominica
- Memphis verticordia echemus (Doubleday, [1849]) – Cuba (allegedly also Honduras in historic reports).
- Memphis verticordia luciana (Hall, 1929) – Saint Lucia and Martinique
- Memphis verticordia mayaguanae (Miller, Simon & Harvey, 1992) – Bahamas
