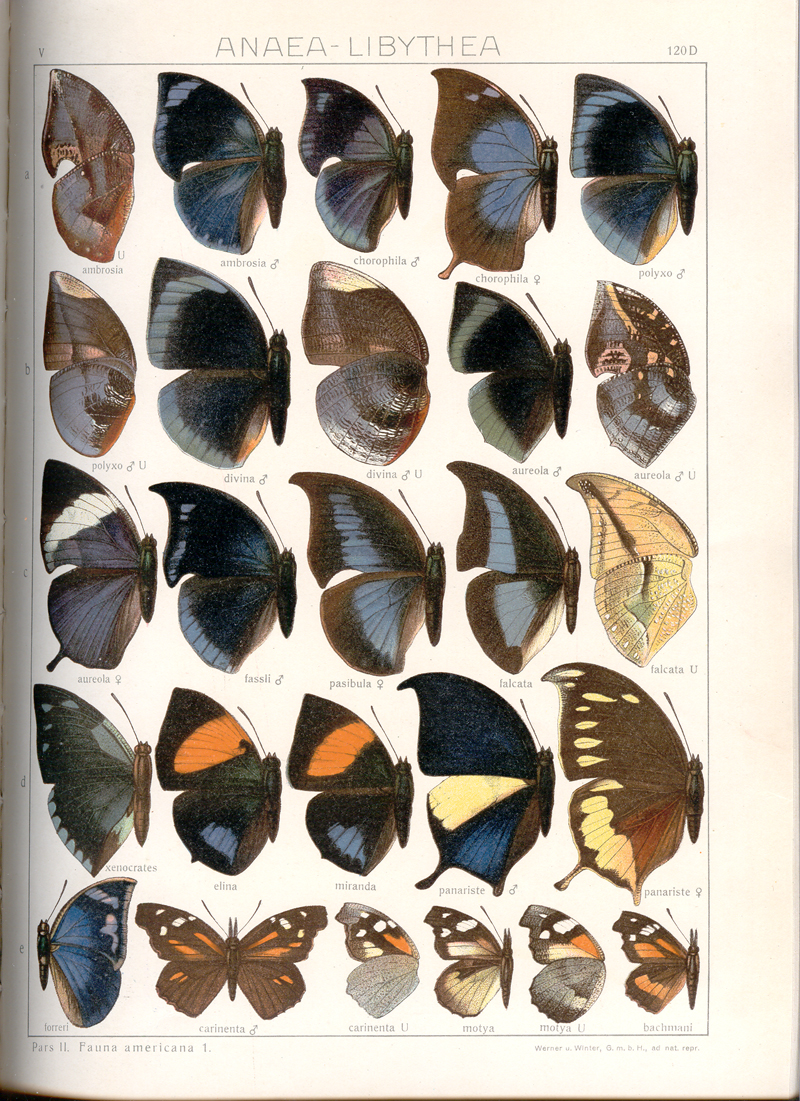

Scientific classification
- Kingdom: Animalia
- Phylum: Arthropoda
- Class: Insecta
- Order: Lepidoptera
- Family: Nymphalidae
- Tribe: Anaeini
- Genus: Memphis
- Species: M. ambrosia

Binomial name
- Memphis ambrosia (Druce, 1874)

= Memphis ambrosia =

Species of butterfly

Memphis ambrosia is a species of leafwing found in South America.

== Subspecies ==
- Memphis ambrosia ambrosia; present in Costa Rica and Panama.
- Memphis ambrosia phoebe (Druce, 1877); present in Bolivia, Peru, and Ecuador.

== Description ==
Memphis ambrosia is a butterfly with forewings with a humped costal edge, angular apex, almost straight outer edge, hook-like inner angle and very concave inner edge. The upper side is brown with a more or less metallic blue and a group of light blue spots near the apex on the forewings. The reverse is orange with metallic reflections and simulates a dead leaf.

Seitz: "The male has on the hindwings bright metallic marginal spots standing between the chief veins, on the so-called intermediate veins."
