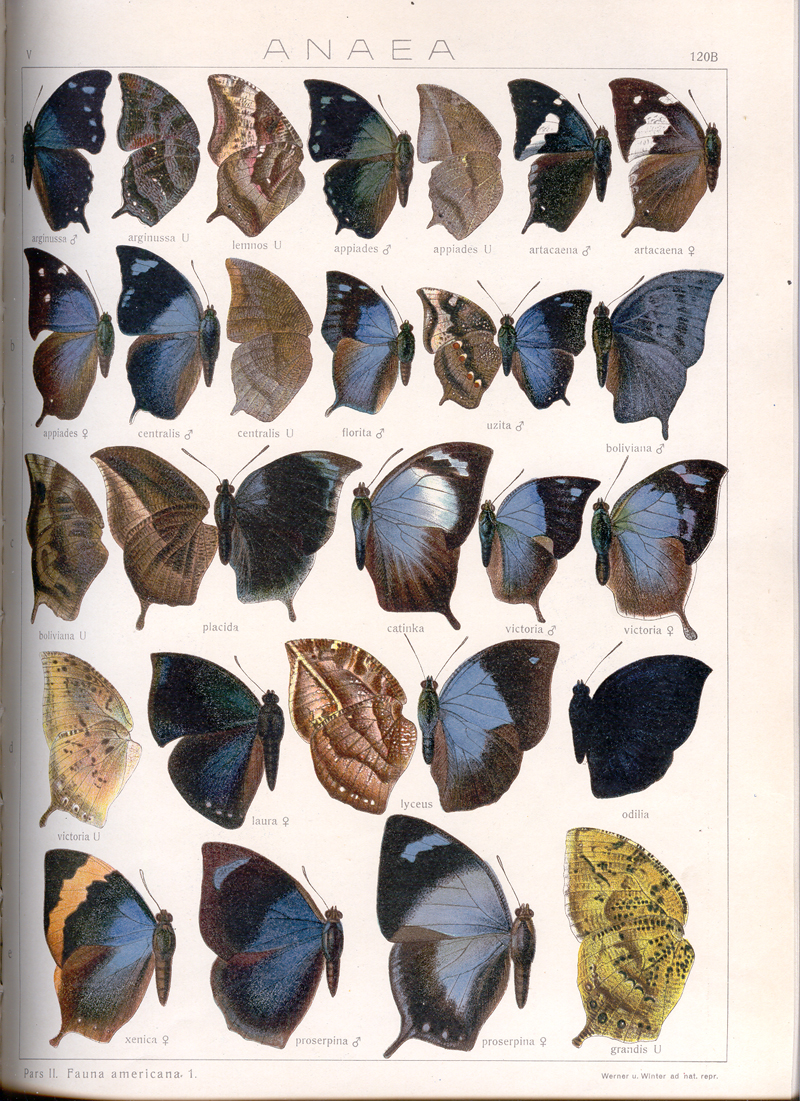

Scientific classification
- Kingdom: Animalia
- Phylum: Arthropoda
- Class: Insecta
- Order: Lepidoptera
- Family: Nymphalidae
- Genus: Memphis
- Species: M. cluvia

Binomial name
- Memphis cluvia ( Hopffer, 1874)

= Memphis cluvia =

Species of butterfly

Memphis cluvia is a species of leafwing found in South America. It is endemic to Bolivia and Ecuador.

== Description ==
Memphis cluvia is a butterfly with a wingspan of about 58 mm, with forewings with a humped costal edge, pointed apex, concave outer edge near the apex, hooked inner angle and very concave inner edge. Each hindwing bears a large club-like tail.The upper side is navy blue, almost black, with a light metallic blue band that is submarginal on the forewings, marginal on the hind wings'Seitz- A. cluvia Hpffr. from Bolivia resembles very much Memphis philumena chaeronea (C. & R. Felder, 1861) (120 A b, c) above, from which, however, it deviates greatly beneath; the forewings have only one band running into the apex of the wings, which parts the wing into two, quite differently coloured halves, the inner half being dark brown, the outer half, however, whitish with brown marbling.

== Ecology and distribution ==
Memphis cluvia is found in Bolivia and Ecuador.
