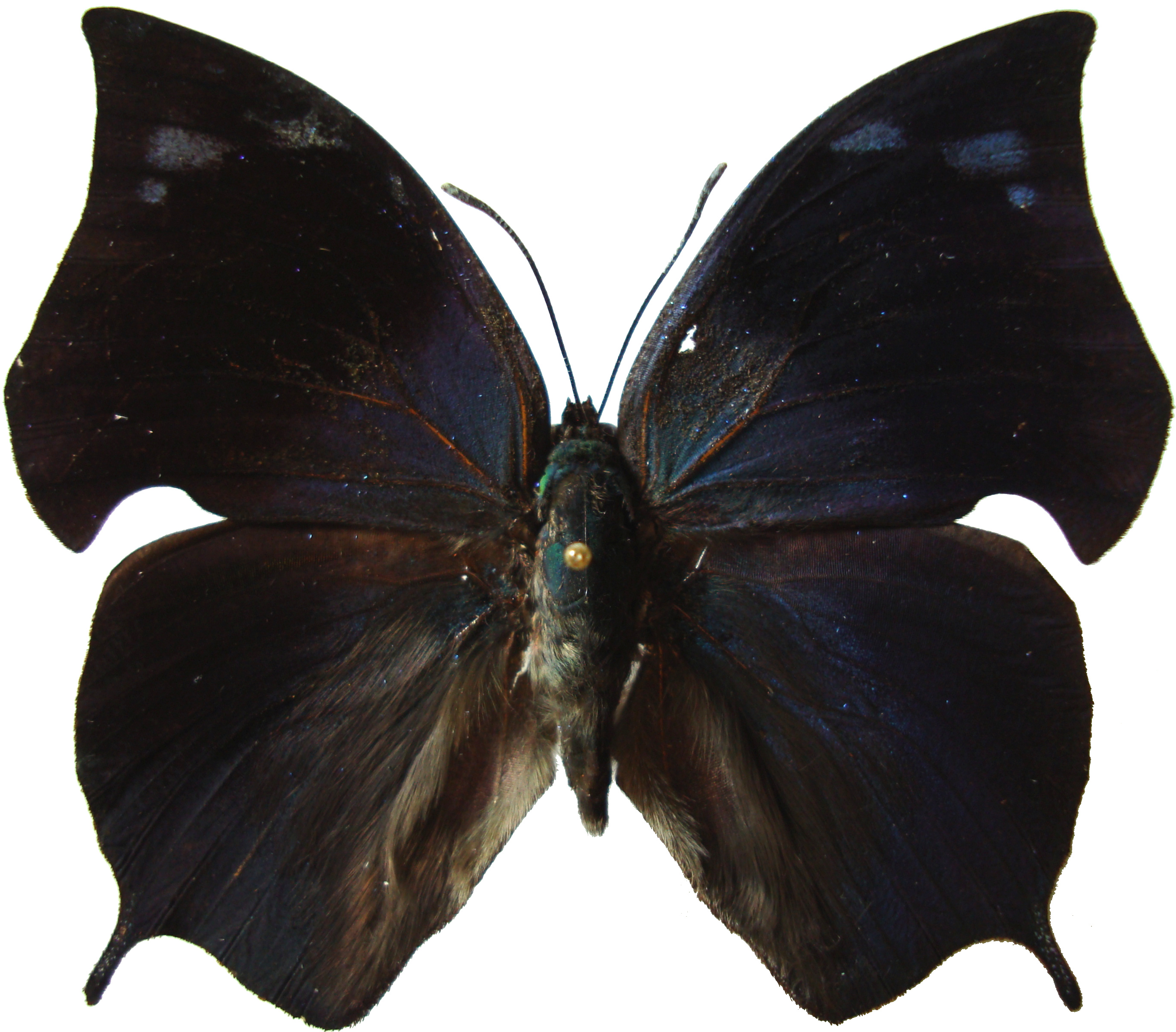

Scientific classification
- Kingdom: Animalia
- Phylum: Arthropoda
- Class: Insecta
- Order: Lepidoptera
- Family: Nymphalidae
- Tribe: Anaeini
- Genus: Memphis
- Species: M. boliviana

Binomial name
- Memphis boliviana (Druce, 1877)

= Memphis boliviana =

Species of butterfly

Memphis boliviana is a species of leafwing found in South America. It is endemic to Bolivia.

Memphis boliviana is a butterfly with forewings with a humped costal edge, pointed apex and concave outer edge. Each hindwing bears a tail. The upper part is navy blue, almost black. The underside is dark grey, almost black and simulates a dead leaf.Seitz-A. boliviana Druce (120 B b, c) from Bolivia is of very dim colours. The male is above deep bluish black, the lightest is the basal area of the forewings, near the apex of the forewing starts a band consisting of 3 spots and running towards the inner margin. The female is beneath lighter brown than the male and has 3 grey spots between the tail and the anal angle. The metal gloss of the upper surface has not the bright shine of the preceding species, but it remains considerably duller, particularly in the male.
