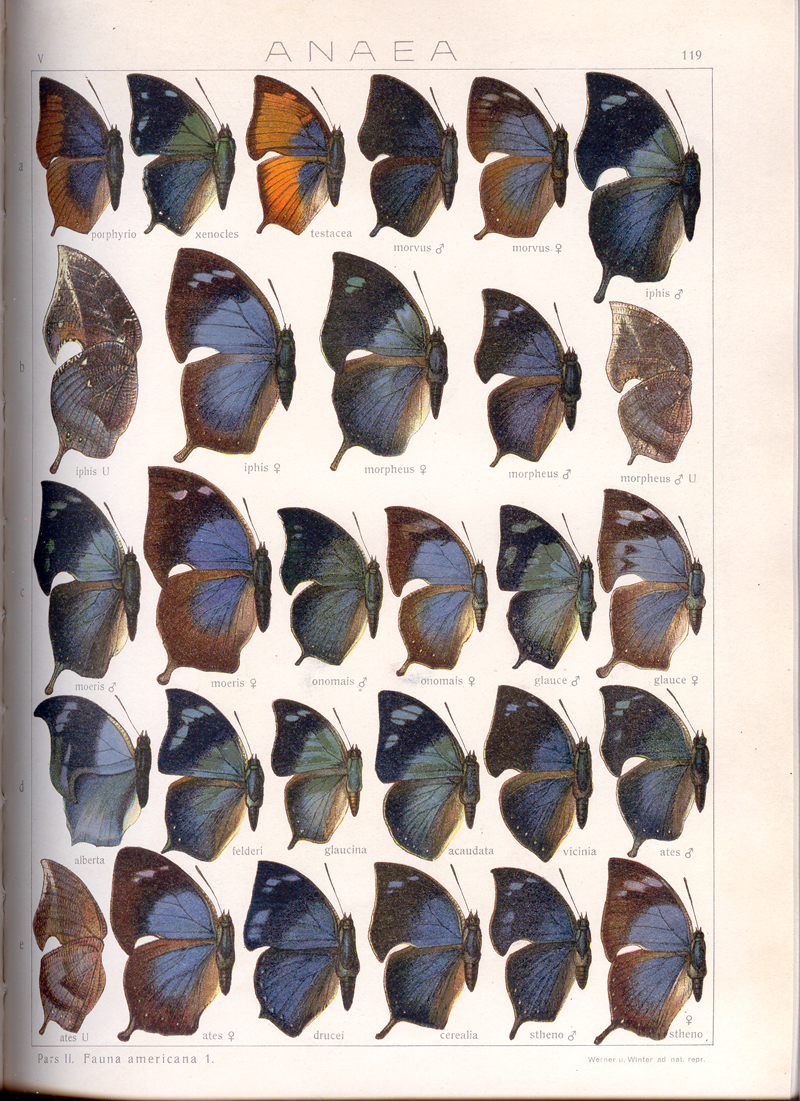

Scientific classification
- Kingdom: Animalia
- Phylum: Arthropoda
- Class: Insecta
- Order: Lepidoptera
- Family: Nymphalidae
- Tribe: Anaeini
- Genus: Memphis
- Species: M. iphis

Binomial name
- Memphis iphis ( Latreille,1813)

= Memphis iphis =

Species of butterfly

Memphis iphis is a species of leafwing found in South America.It is endemic to Peru. The type locality is uncertain.

== Description ==
Memphis iphis is a butterfly with forewings with a humped costal edge, pointed apex, concave outer edge, hooked inner angle and concave inner edge. Each hindwing bears a club-shaped tail.The upper part is navy blue, almost black, with a few blue spots on the forewings in a submarginal line.The underside is dark and simulates a dead leaf.Julius Rober in Seitz It is still undecided which form has to be considered as iphis Latr. (119 a, b). We have figured a Colombian specimen of that form, which is generally thought to be iphis. It is a large butterfly with long tails and a very much falciformly protracted inner angle of the forewings, the apical part of which exhibits bright blue spots being, however, not continued along the distal margin. Beneath the light small scales are arranged to a narrow marginal band and an oblique line cutting off the part of the inner angle.
