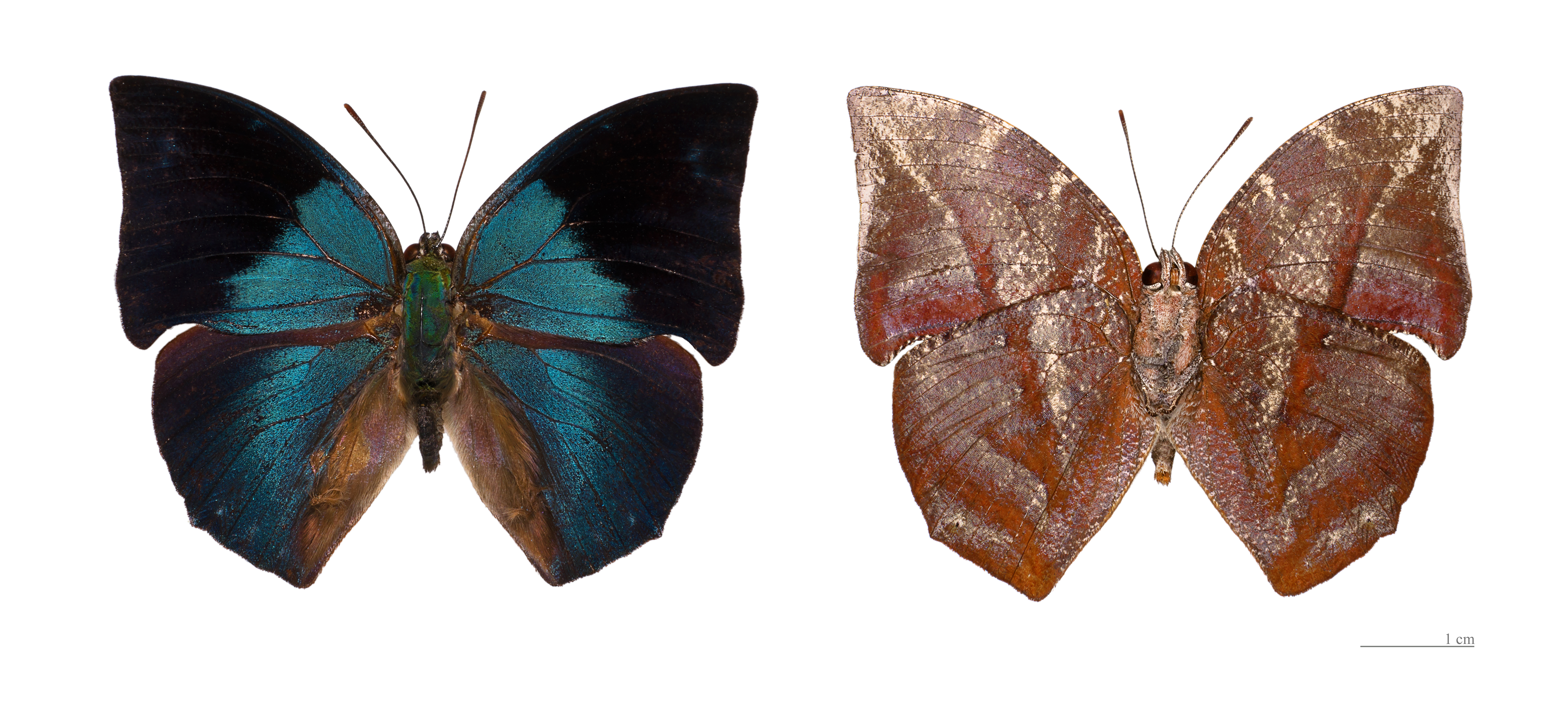

Scientific classification
- Kingdom: Animalia
- Phylum: Arthropoda
- Class: Insecta
- Order: Lepidoptera
- Family: Nymphalidae
- Genus: Memphis
- Species: M. phantes

Binomial name
- Memphis phantes (Hopffer, 1874)

= Memphis phantes =

Species of butterfly

Memphis phantes is a species of leafwing found in South America.

List of subspecies:

- Memphis phantes phantes, present in Bolivia and Peru.

Synonymy for this subspecies: Anaea vicinia iphimedes (Röber, 1916)

- Memphis phantes vicinia (Staudinger, 1887), present in French Guiana and Peru.

Synonymy for this subspecies: Anaea phantes vicinia Staudinger, 1887

== Description ==
Memphis phantes is a leaf-winged butterfly with a humped costal edge, angular apex, almost straight outer edge, hook-like inner angle and very concave inner edge with a club-like tail on each hindwing. The upper part is dark blue to black in males, brown with a light blue basal part in females. The underside is marked with rufous and in the female light yellow with a brown oblique band from the inner edge of the forewing to the apex and from the costal edge of the hindwing.Rather variable above, because there may be abundant as well as little submarginal marking; the under surface, however, is rather constant. The males also vary greatly in size.
