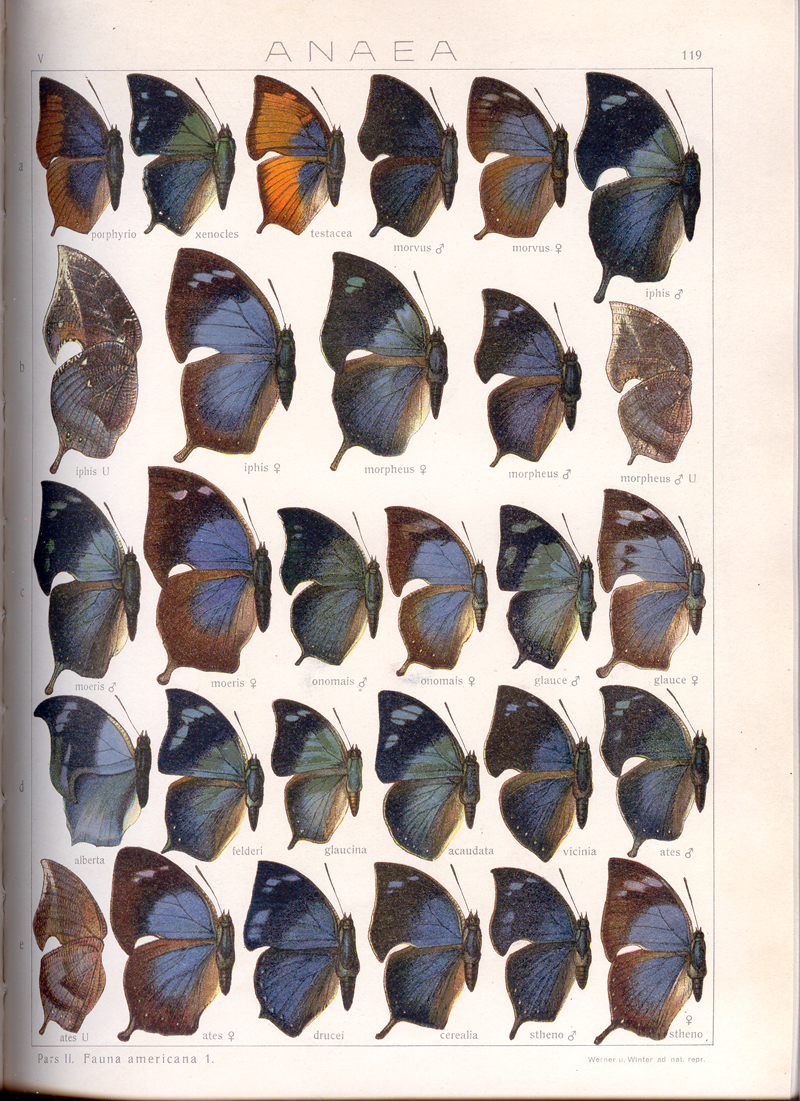
- acaudata depicted in Seitz Macrolepidoptera of the World (d)

Scientific classification
- Kingdom: Animalia
- Phylum: Arthropoda
- Class: Insecta
- Order: Lepidoptera
- Family: Nymphalidae
- Genus: Memphis
- Species: M. acaudata

Binomial name
- Memphis acaudata (Röber, 1916)

= Memphis acaudata =

Species of butterfly

Memphis acaudata is a species of leafwing found in South America. It is endemic to Bolivia.

Memphis acaudata is a butterfly with forewings with a humped costal edge, concave outer edge and slightly concave inner edge. The upper side is navy blue, almost black, marked with metallic ultramarine blue in the basal part and near the apex of the forewings. The reverse side is brown with metallic reflections and simulates a dead leaf. Rober in Seitz- A. acaudata spec. nov. (119d) from Bolivia at first sight makes the impression of a felderi (119 d) without tails. The shape of the wings, however, is still quite different: the apex of the forewings is more rounded, the distal margin is almost straight, there is no trace whatever of the small tail and the inner angle of the hindwing is rounded. The marking of the forewings is almost the same as in felderi, but the greenish-blue colouring of the hindwings expands further distally. The under surface is generally lighter than in felderi, through the wings, from the middle of the costal margin of the forewings towards the middle of the inner margin of the hindwings, runs a blurred dark band; in a basal direction from this band the wings are darker than on the distal part; from below the apex of the wings to the first median vein of the forewings runs a greyish-brownish band and the hindwings have a blurred greenish-blackish submarginal band in the reddish-grey distal part; between the second and third median veins there is a small black, submarginal dot.
