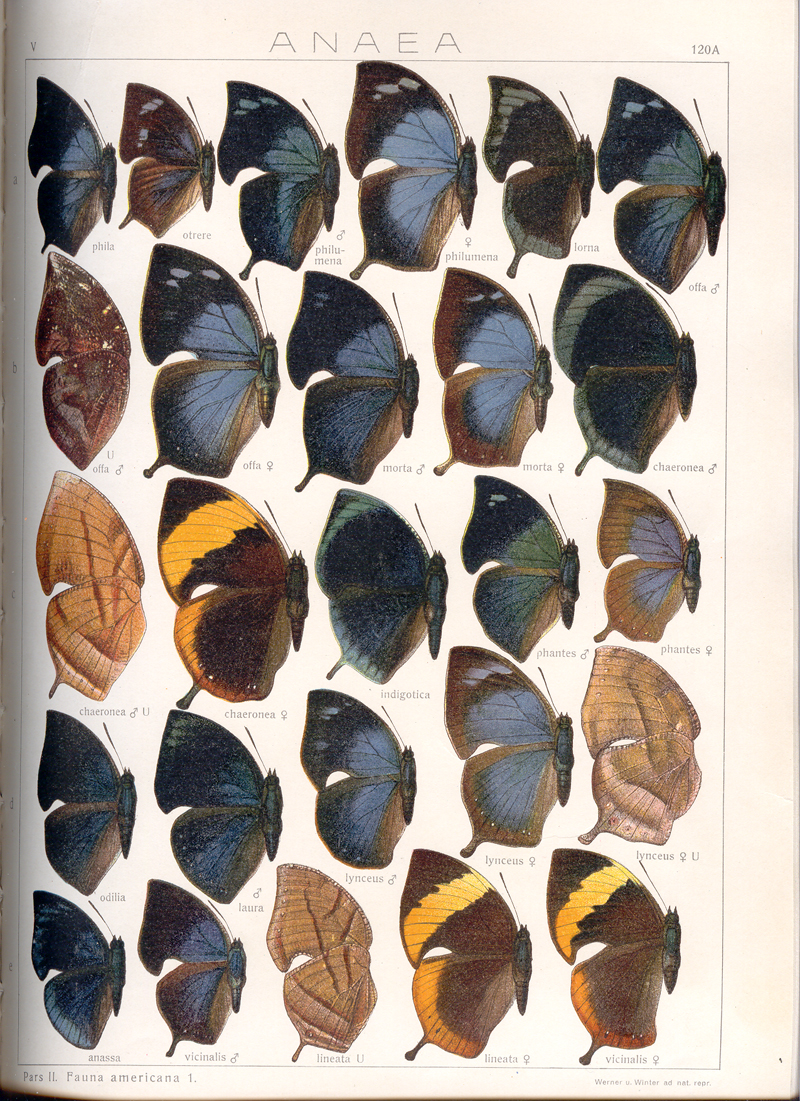

Scientific classification
- Kingdom: Animalia
- Phylum: Arthropoda
- Class: Insecta
- Order: Lepidoptera
- Family: Nymphalidae
- Tribe: Anaeini
- Genus: Memphis
- Species: M. otrere

Binomial name
- Memphis otrere (Hübner, 1825

= Memphis otrere =

Species of butterfly

Memphis otrere is a species of leafwing found in South America.It is endemic to Brazil. Memphis otrere is a butterfly with forewings with a humped costal edge, angular apex, almost straight outer edge, hook-like inner angle and concave inner edge. The hindwings with a tail.The upper side has a sexual dimorphism of colour, the male is dark brown, the female light golden brown with the same metallic blue ornamentation in the basal part of the forewings and in suffusion on the hind wings. A few blue spots near the apex of the forewings complete the ornamentation.The underside is yellowed beige and simulates a dead leaf.Seitz - it is beneath like the preceding species [Memphis moruus stheno], but somewhat more marked. Except in front of the apex there are blue reflecting spots also before the middle of the border of the forewing; but they are much further away from the border than in similar species.
