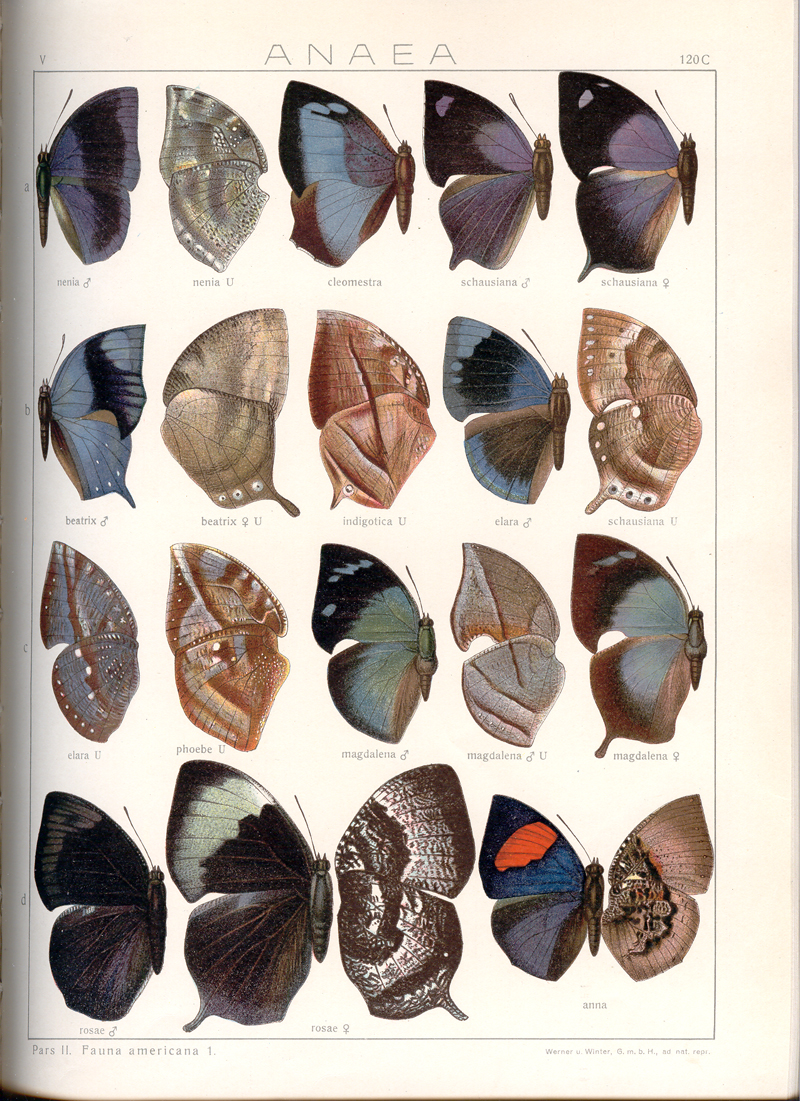

Scientific classification
- Kingdom: Animalia
- Phylum: Arthropoda
- Class: Insecta
- Order: Lepidoptera
- Family: Nymphalidae
- Genus: Memphis
- Species: M. nenia

Binomial name
- Memphis nenia (Druce, 1877)

= Memphis nenia =

Species of butterfly

Memphis nenia is a species of leafwing found in South America (Colombia and Brazil).

== Subspecies ==
- Memphis nenia nenia
- Memphis nenia threnodion (Bargmann, 1929)

== Description ==
Memphis nenia is a butterfly with forewings with a humped costal edge, pointed apex, slightly concave outer edge, hook-like inner angle and very concave inner edge. The upper part is dark brown almost black. The underside is dark brown, with very little white dotted and simulates a dead leaf.Seitz - A. nenia Druce (120 Ca) from the Upper Amazon (Sao Paulo) has another shape of the wings (a less sinuous inner margin of the forewings), and the under surface differs considerably from that of odilia, being dull dusty-grey, irrorated in white, with a darker median band and marginal band the latter of which exhibits on the hindwing light clouded spots.
