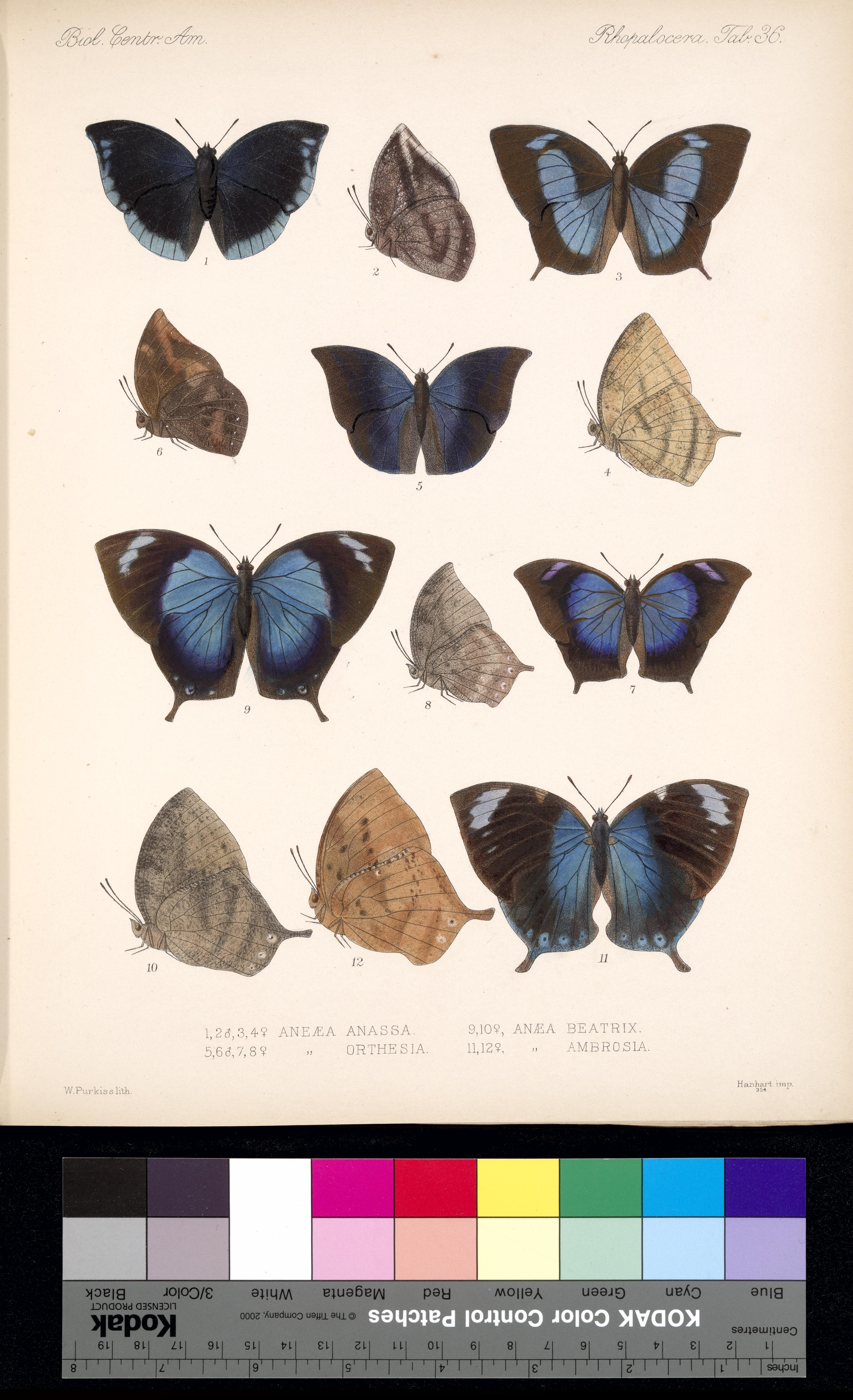
- Memphis mora orthesia in Godman & Salvin, 1884

Scientific classification
- Kingdom: Animalia
- Phylum: Arthropoda
- Clade: Pancrustacea
- Class: Insecta
- Order: Lepidoptera
- Family: Nymphalidae
- Genus: Memphis
- Species: M. mora

Binomial name
- Memphis mora (Druce, 1874)

= Memphis mora =

Species of butterfly

Memphis mora is a species of leafwing found in South America.

== Subspecies ==
- Memphis mora mora; present in Colombia.
- Memphis mora annetta (Comstock, 1961); present in Ecuador.
- Memphis mora montana (Röber, 1916); present in Peru.
- Memphis mora orthesia (Godman & Salvin, 1884)

== Description ==
Memphis mora is a butterfly with a wingspan of about 55 mm, with forewings with a humped costal edge, angular apex, concave outer edge near the apex, hooked inner angle and concave inner edge. The upper part is dark navy blue with a metallic blue basal part. The reverse is orange with metallic reflections and simulates a dead leaf. Seitz- Upper surface greenish- black, basal half of the forewing of a dim green, a green spot near the apex of the forewing and an indistinct spot near the anterior angle of the hindwings, being slightly tinged in greenish. Hindwing without a tail, basal half and distal margin green, a row of 4 small whitish spots from the anal angle to the apex. Under surface dark brown, all the wings spotted in chestnut brown, with greyish scales along the costal margin of the forewing, all the wings with a submarginal row of indistinct white spots.montana subsp. nov.[Röber] from Central Peru (Hunamobamba, 1500 m, A. H. Fass.) is the larger alpine form with much more subapical and submarginal marking of the upper sur- face. The under surface is lighter blue and less irrorated in white.male forewing purple-black, dusted in blue at the base, the margin of the forewing indistinctly blue. Under surface chestnut-brown, everywhere irrorated rust- reddish and white. Forewing very pointed, hindwing without a tail.orthesia female brownish-black, at the base blue, fore- wing with a blue spot near the apex, under surface brown, with a reddish tinge, irrorated in brown and white; hindwings with tails. The female resembles greatly oenomais (119 ¢) but the wings are more pointed and their in basal area of a more intense blue colour. Deviating from mora mora by a more purple hue of the wings, the blue of the basal area being less tinged greenish etc. Mexico, Guatemala
