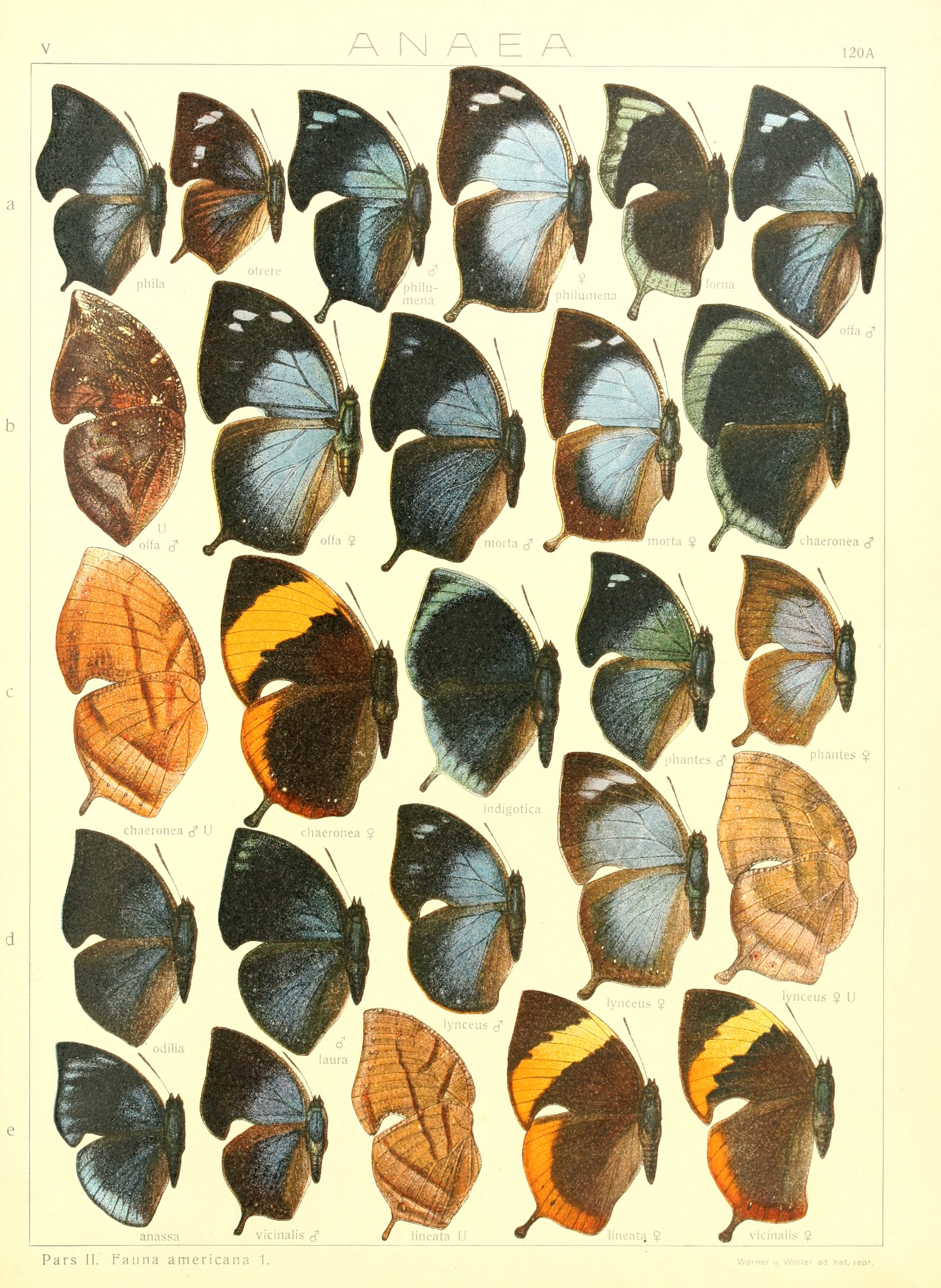

Scientific classification
- Kingdom: Animalia
- Phylum: Arthropoda
- Class: Insecta
- Order: Lepidoptera
- Family: Nymphalidae
- Tribe: Anaeini
- Genus: Memphis
- Species: M. lorna

Binomial name
- Memphis lorna (Druce, 1877)

= Memphis lorna =

Species of butterfly

Memphis lorna is a species of leafwing found in South America. It is endemic to Bolivia.

== Description ==
Memphis lorna is a butterfly with forewings with a humped costal edge, pointed apex and concave outer edge. Each hindwing bears a tail. The upper side is navy blue, almost black, with a line of blue spots on the forewings near the apex and a blue-grey marginal line on the hindwings (the tails are also blue-grey). Characteristic is the broad light blue margin of the hindwing being sparsely dusted in dark. The underside is dark grey, almost black and simulates a dead leaf.
