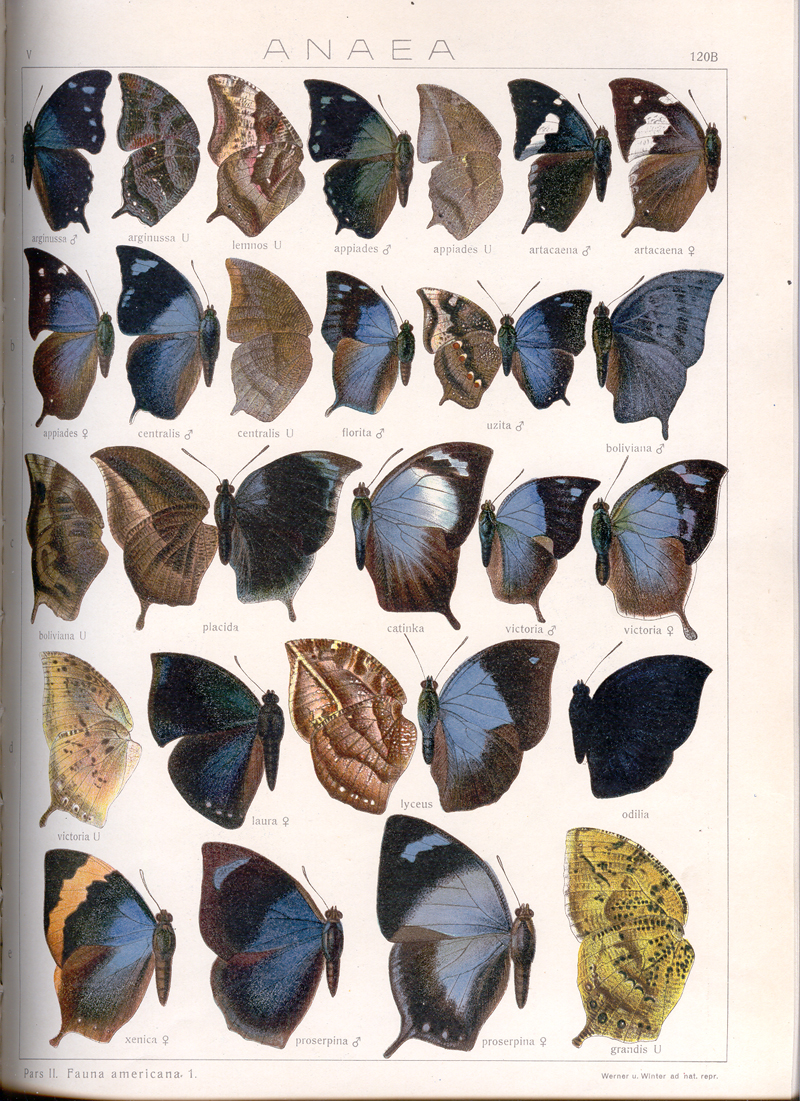

Scientific classification
- Kingdom: Animalia
- Phylum: Arthropoda
- Class: Insecta
- Order: Lepidoptera
- Family: Nymphalidae
- Genus: Memphis
- Species: M. lyceus

Binomial name
- Memphis lyceus (Druce, 1877)

= Memphis lyceus =

Species of butterfly

Memphis lyceus is a species of leafwing found in South America (Costa Rica, Colombia, Bolivia, and Ecuador).

Memphis lyceus is a leafwing butterfly with a humped costal edge, a concave outer edge near the apex, a hook-like inner angle, and a concave inner edge. The upper part of the male is dark blue, almost black, with a metallic blue basal part. The reverse side is reddish-brown and mimics a dead leaf.Seitz - A. lyceus Druce (120 Bd) lies before us in several males from West Colombia (Cauca-Valley, and 1 pair from the Aguaca-Valley, 2000 m) and 3 females from Bolivia (Rio Songo, 750 m, A. H. Fassl), according to Druce this species occurs also in Ecuador. While in the Colombian female the violet-blue basal part occupies only scarcely the half and the subapical marking is very insignificant and blurred, the Bolivian females have a larger and greenish-blue basal part and greatly developed subapical and also some submarginal marking. Beneath these females are browner and have a much more silky gloss. We denote this form as lynceus subsp. nov. (120 Ad).
