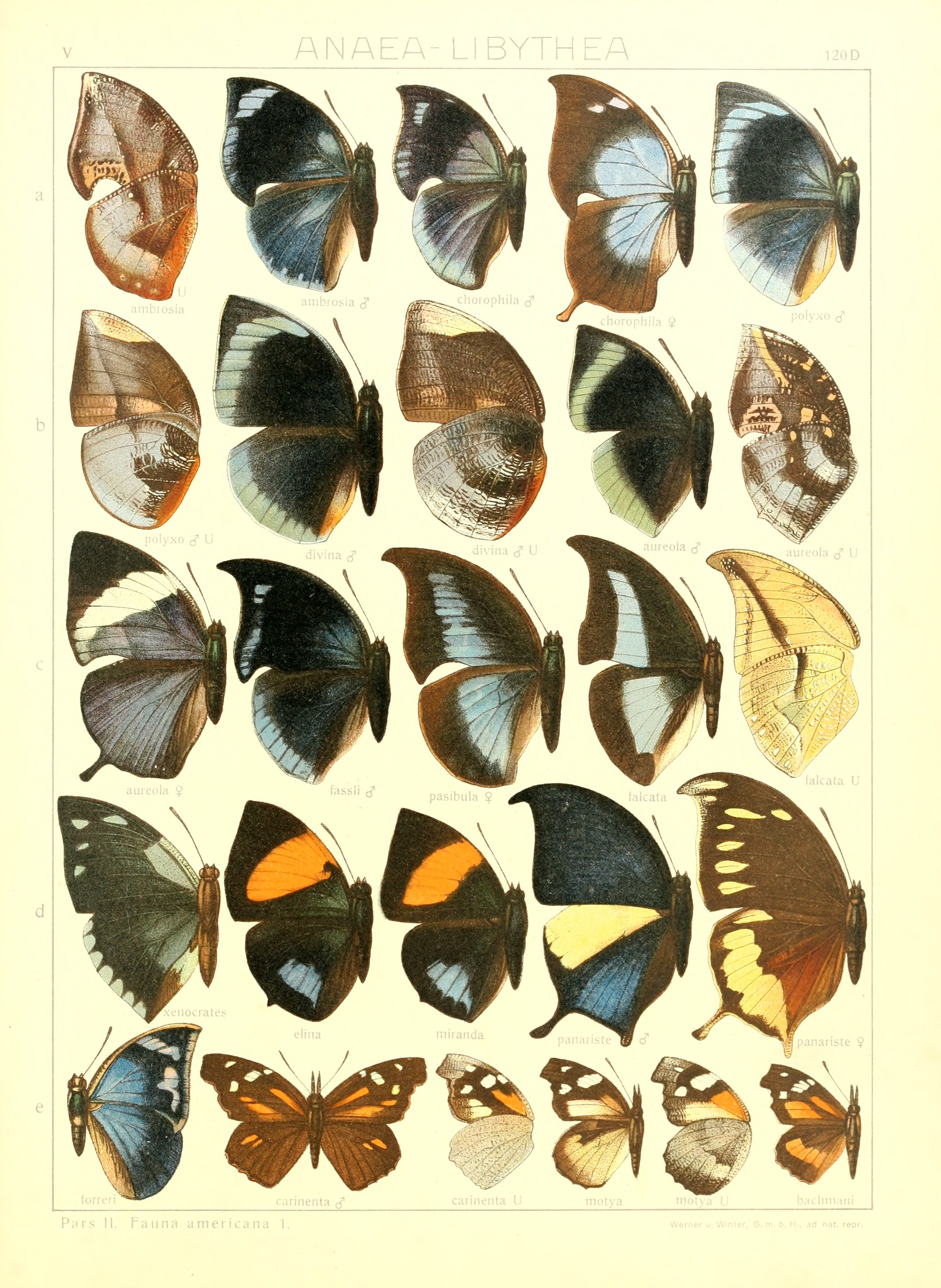

Scientific classification
- Kingdom: Animalia
- Phylum: Arthropoda
- Class: Insecta
- Order: Lepidoptera
- Family: Nymphalidae
- Genus: Memphis
- Species: M. falcata

Binomial name
- Memphis falcata (Hoppfer, 1874)

= Memphis falcata =

Species of butterfly

Memphis falcata is a species of leafwing found in Peru.

Memphis falcata is a butterfly with forewings with a humped costal edge, hook-like apex, concave outer edge and very concave inner edge. The upper part is brown with a metallic light blue postdiscal stripe. The underside is beige yellow and simulates a dead leaf.is the sole Anaea [Memphis] with a blue median band of the males. Most of the specimens have on the under surface of the hindwings a short straight band not like the figured specimen in which there is a distal continuation of this band. — The species. is very rare.
