= Memphis eurypyle =

Scientific classification
- Kingdom: Animalia
- Phylum: Arthropoda
- Class: Insecta
- Order: Lepidoptera
- Family: Nymphalidae
- Tribe: Anaeini
- Genus: Memphis
- Species: M. eurypyle

Binomial name
- Memphis eurypyle (Felder, C. & R. Felder, 1862)

Species of butterfly

Memphis eurypyle is a species of leafwing found in South America. It is now in the genus Fountainea.
