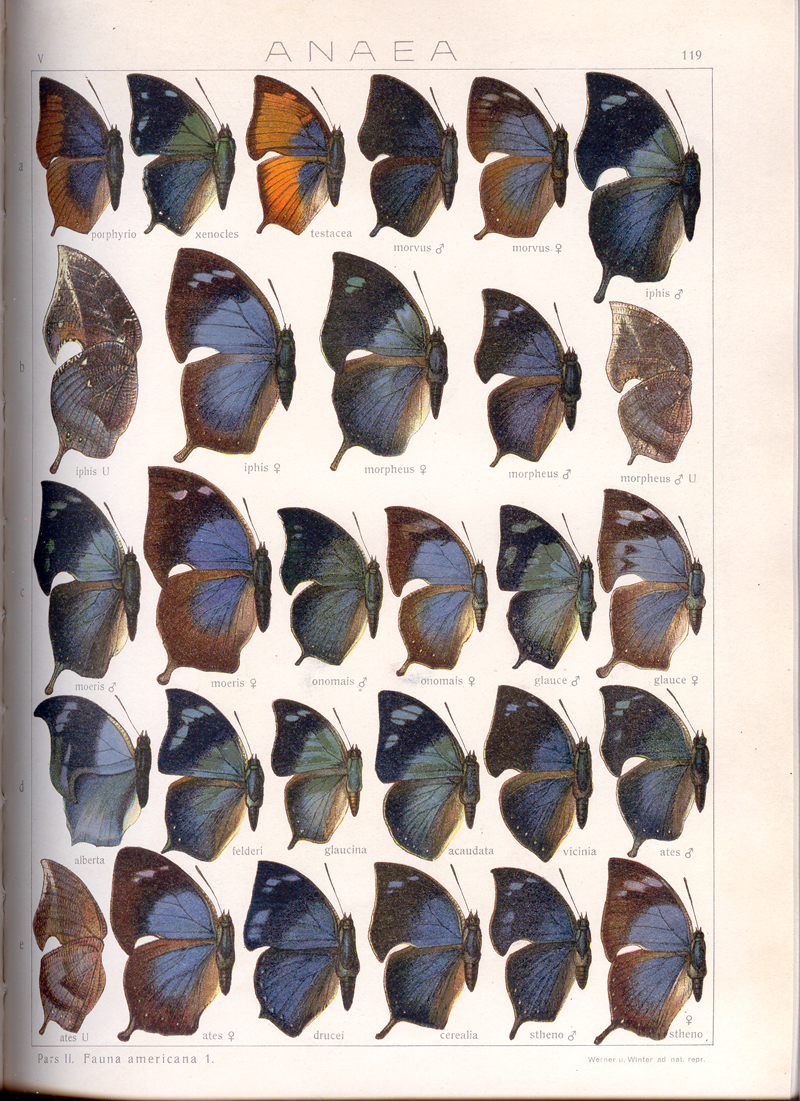

Scientific classification
- Kingdom: Animalia
- Phylum: Arthropoda
- Class: Insecta
- Order: Lepidoptera
- Family: Nymphalidae
- Tribe: Anaeini
- Genus: Memphis
- Species: M. moeris

Binomial name
- Memphis moeris (C. Felder & R. Felder, [1867])

= Memphis moeris =

Species of butterfly

Memphis moeris is a species of leafwing found in South America. It is endemic to Colombia

Memphis moeris is a butterfly with forewings with a humped costal edge, pointed apex, a concave outer edge near the apex, hooked inner angle and very concave inner edge, and hind wings each with a club-like tail.The upper part is dark blue, almost black, with a metallic blue basal part.Seitz A. moeris Feldr. (119) from Colombia is conspicuously marked in intense green. The hindwings have very long tails, and the inner angle of the forewings forms a pointed sickle. Whether it is a proper species or a form of morvus, we cannot decide.
