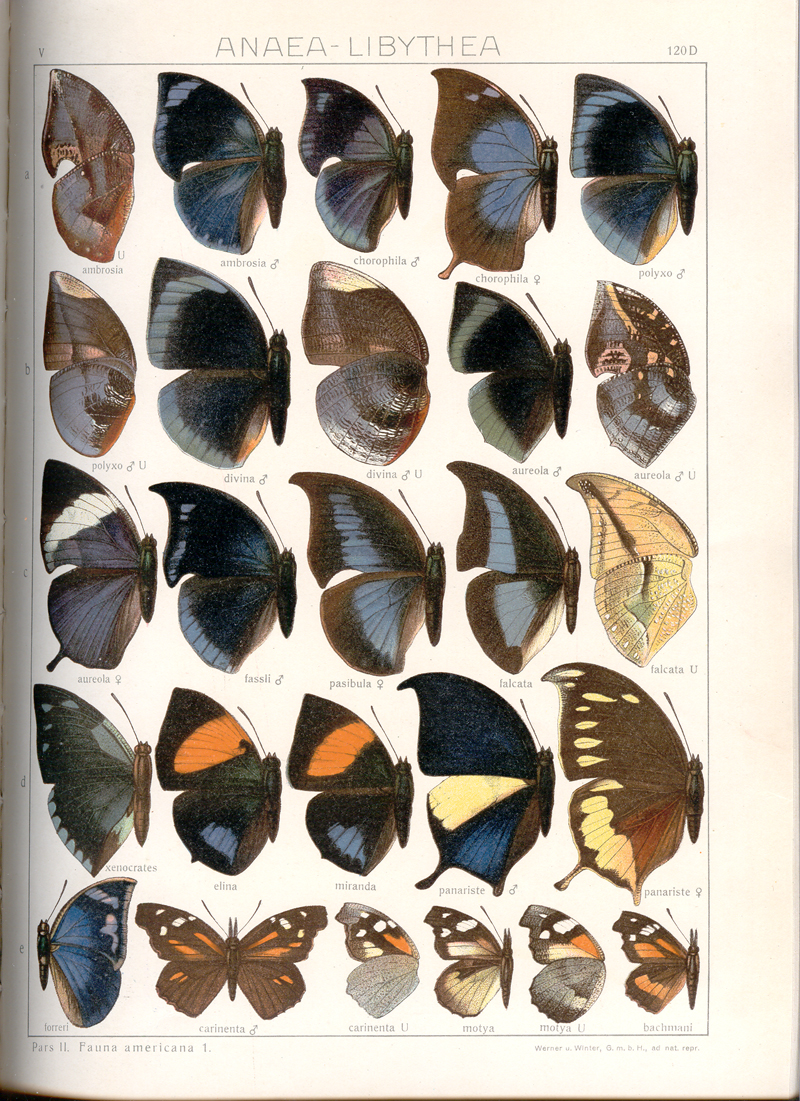

Scientific classification
- Kingdom: Animalia
- Phylum: Arthropoda
- Class: Insecta
- Order: Lepidoptera
- Family: Nymphalidae
- Tribe: Anaeini
- Genus: Memphis
- Species: M. catinka

Binomial name
- Memphis catinka (H. Druce, 1877)

Synonyms
- Paphia catinka Druce, 1877; Paphia florita Druce, 1877

= Memphis catinka =

Species of butterfly

Memphis catinka is a species of leafwing found in South America (Colombia and Peru).

Memphis catinka is a butterfly with forewings with a humped costal edge, hooked inner angle and concave inner edge. Each hindwing bears a tail.The upper part is pearly blue, broadly edged with grey or almost completely dark grey.The reverse side is brown with metallic reflections and simulates a dead leaf.Seitz - was described and figured by Druce (120 Bc) according to a female of unknown habitat.Easily recognizable by the very light blue of the upper surface being brightened to white in the disk of the forewing.
