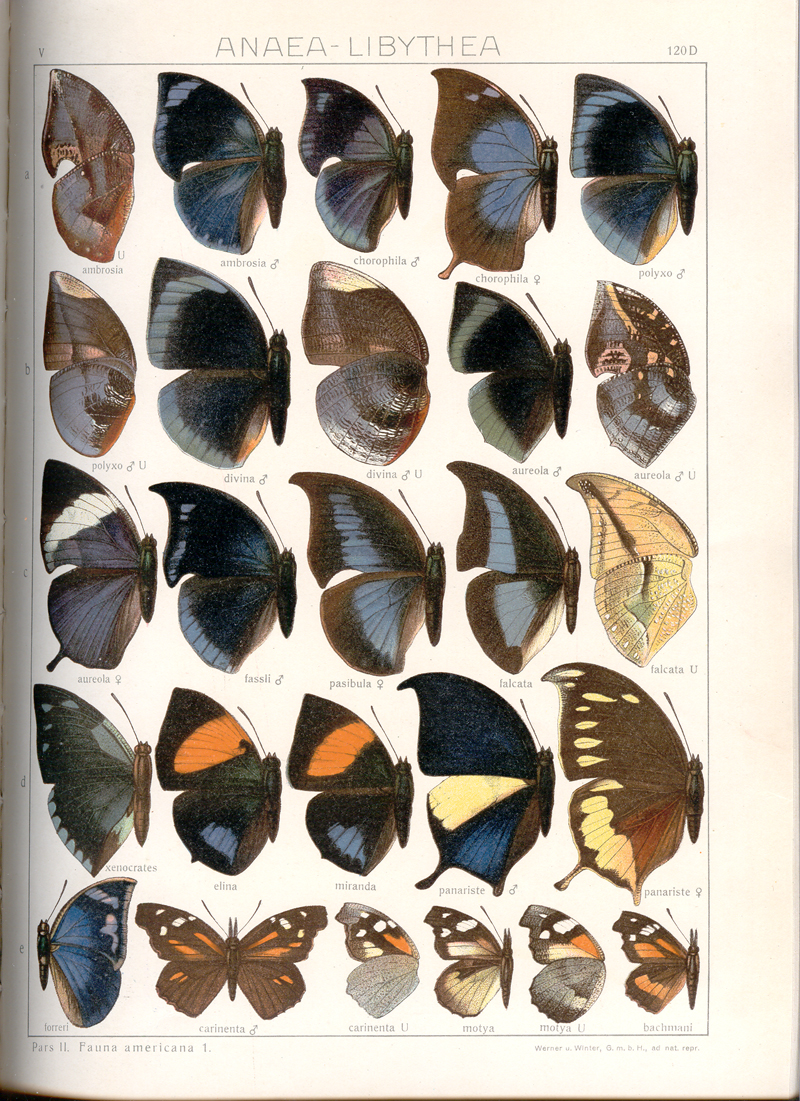

Scientific classification
- Kingdom: Animalia
- Phylum: Arthropoda
- Class: Insecta
- Order: Lepidoptera
- Family: Nymphalidae
- Genus: Memphis
- Species: M. polyxo

Binomial name
- Memphis polyxo (Druce, 1874)

= Memphis polyxo =

Species of butterfly

Memphis polyxo is a species of leafwing found in South America. It is present in Colombia, Bolivia, Ecuador, Peru, and Brazil.

Memphis polyxo is a butterfly with a wingspan of about 58 mm, having forewings with a bulging costal edge, angular apex, and almost straight outer edge. The upper side is navy blue adorned with a metallic blue band, submarginal on the forewings and marginal on the hindwings. The underside is shiny dark brown and mimics a dead leaf. Seitz- A. polyxo Druce (120 Da, b) from the Upper Amazon, from Colombia, Peru, Bolivia, and according to Druce also from Rio is a very attractive species with a pretty and most characteristic under surface. The specimen before us from Bolivia (Coroico, 1200 m, A. H. Fass) is beneath much lighter.
