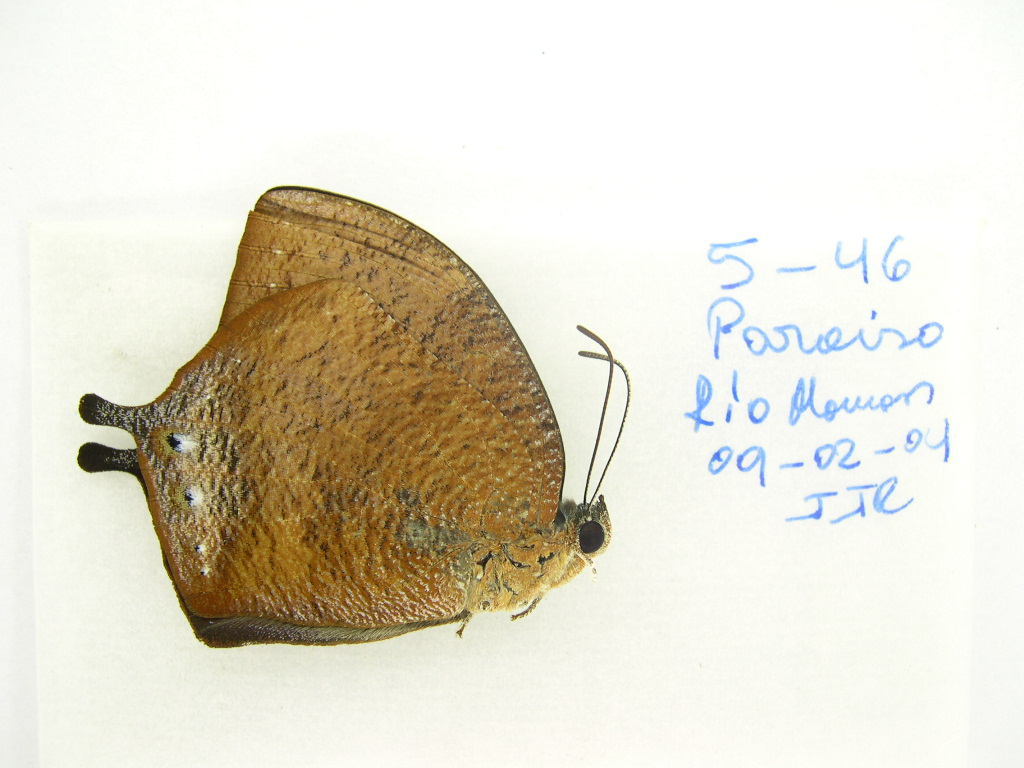

Scientific classification
- Kingdom: Animalia
- Phylum: Arthropoda
- Clade: Pancrustacea
- Class: Insecta
- Order: Lepidoptera
- Family: Nymphalidae
- Genus: Memphis
- Species: M. proserpina

Binomial name
- Memphis proserpina (Salvin, 1869)

= Memphis proserpina =

Species of butterfly

Memphis proserpina is a species of leafwing butterfly found in South America.

== Subspecies ==
- Memphis proserpina proserpina, present in Guatemala.
- Memphis proserpina elara (Godman & Salvin, 1897) present in Costa Rica and Panama.
- Memphis proserpina kingi (Miller & Nicolay, 1971), present in Panama.
- Memphis proserpina schausiana (Godman & Salvin, 1894), present in Mexico.

== Description ==
Memphis proserpina is a butterfly with forewings with a humped costal edge and hooked internal angle. Each hindwing has a tail that is sometimes minimal. The upper side is navy blue with a metallic blue basal part on the forewings and a line of large metallic blue spots highlighting the apex, and on the hindwings a broad metallic blue suffusion. The underside is reddish-brown with metallic reflections and simulates a dead leaf.
