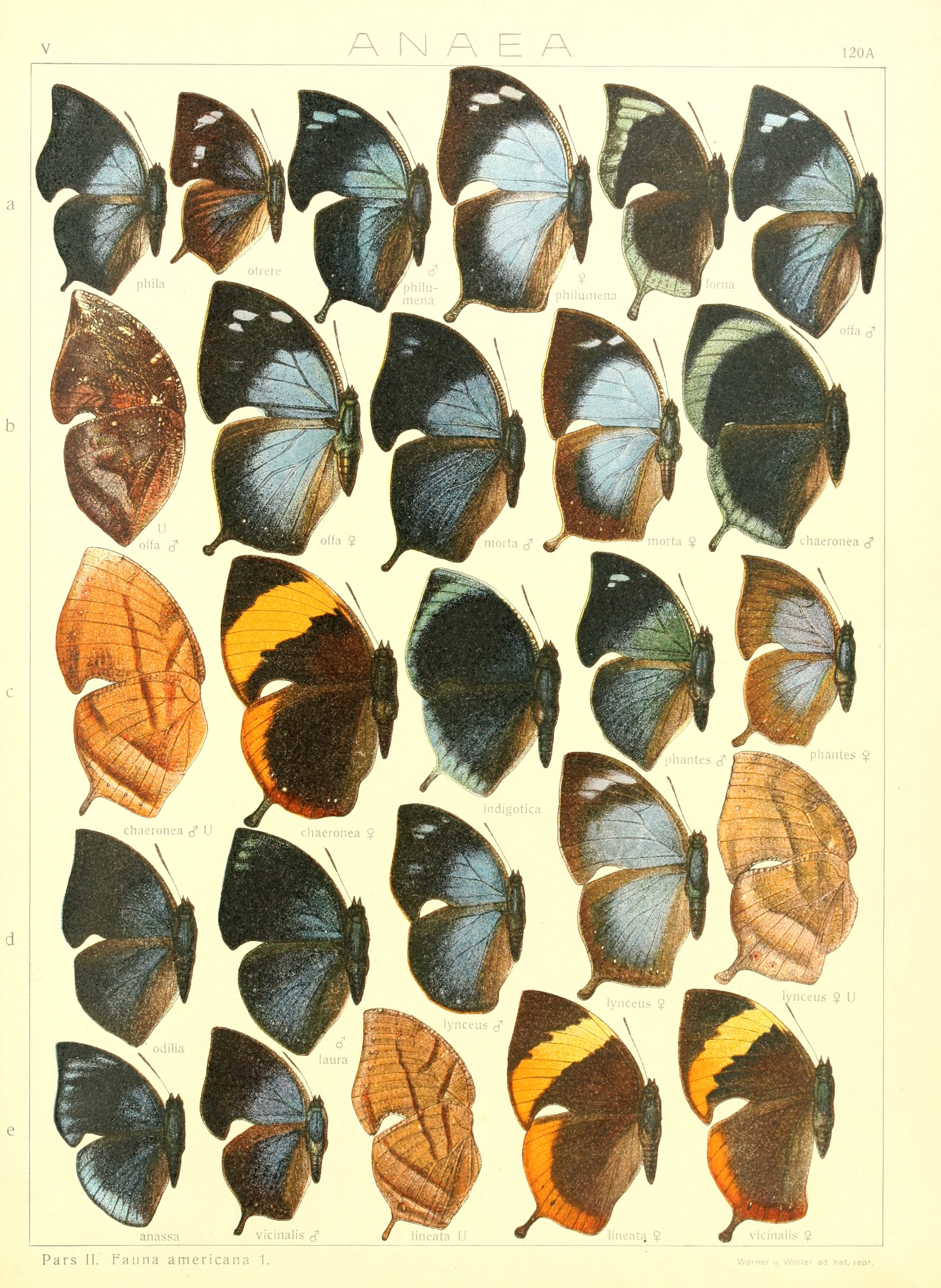
- In Seitz's Macrolepidoptera of the World

Scientific classification
- Kingdom: Animalia
- Phylum: Arthropoda
- Class: Insecta
- Order: Lepidoptera
- Family: Nymphalidae
- Tribe: Anaeini
- Genus: Memphis
- Species: M. laura

Binomial name
- Memphis laura (Druce, 1877)

= Memphis laura =

Species of butterfly

Memphis laura is a species of leafwing found in South America.

== Subspecies ==
- Memphis laura laura; present in Costa Rica and Colombia.
- Memphis laura balboa (Hall, 1927) present in Panama.
- Memphis laura caucana (Joicey & Talbot, 1922)
- Memphis laura rosae (Fassl, 1909) present in Colombia.

== Description ==
Memphis laura is a butterfly with forewings with a humped costal edge, an almost straight outer edge, an internal angle in the shape of a hook. The upper part is orange-brown with metallic blue accents. The reverse side is orange and simulates a dead leaf.Seitz- Males above intensely black with an indistinct, dull greenish tinge growing somewhat more prominent at the base of the forewing. The under surface is also chestnut-brown with silvery white scaling; before the apex of the hindwing there is a large silvery white costal spot, in front of it a light undulate band composed of silvery interspersed, small scales.
