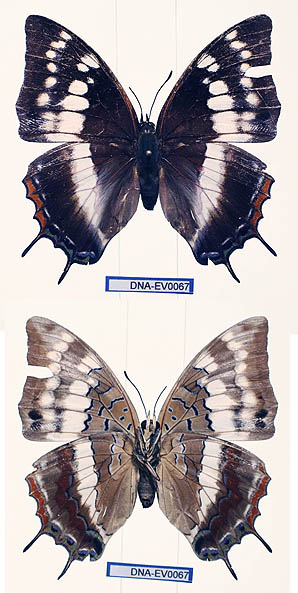

Scientific classification
- Kingdom: Animalia
- Phylum: Arthropoda
- Class: Insecta
- Order: Lepidoptera
- Family: Nymphalidae
- Subfamily: Charaxinae
- Tribe: Charaxini
- Genus: Charaxes
- Species: C. pembanus

Binomial name
- Charaxes pembanus Jordan, 1925.

Synonyms
- Charaxes etheocles pembanus Jordan, 1925; Charaxes pembanus f. coelestissima Turlin, 1987

= Charaxes pembanus =

Species of butterfly

Charaxes pembanus is a butterfly in the family Nymphalidae. It is found on Pemba Island, just off the east coast of Africa.

== Description ==
Similar to Charaxes usambarae but with shorter tails, less dentate wing margins and the females with larger pale forewing spots.

== Biology ==
The habitat consists of forest margins and woodland.

The larvae probably feed on Albizia species.

== Taxonomy ==
Charaxes pembanus is a member of the large species group Charaxes etheocles.
