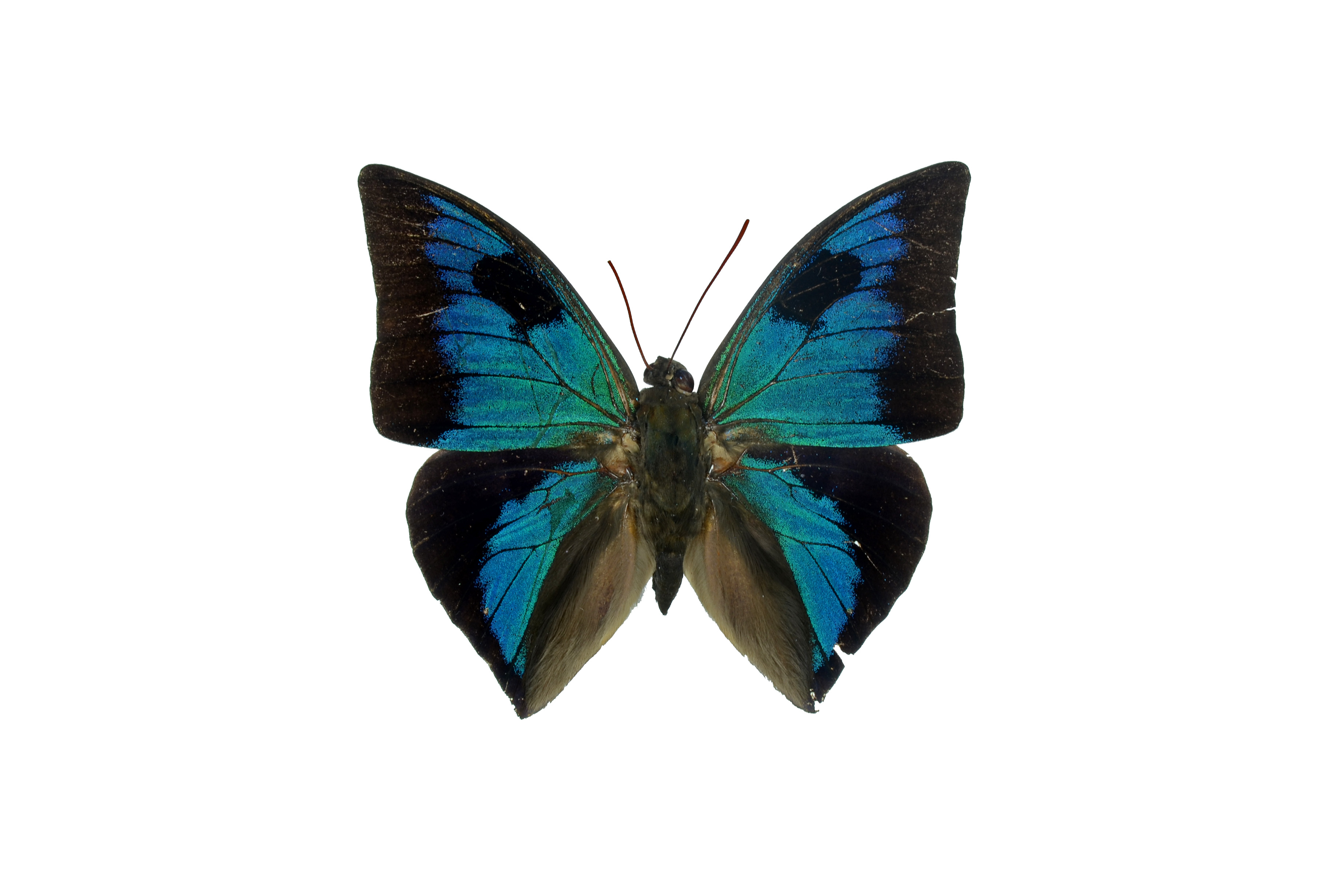

Scientific classification
- Domain: Eukaryota
- Kingdom: Animalia
- Phylum: Arthropoda
- Class: Insecta
- Order: Lepidoptera
- Family: Nymphalidae
- Tribe: Preponini
- Genus: Anaeomorpha; Rothschild, 1894
- Species: A. splendida

Binomial name
- Anaeomorpha splendida Rothschild, 1894

= Anaeomorpha =

Monotypic genus of brush-footed butterflies

Anaeomorpha is a monotypic genus of butterflies in the subfamily Charaxinae.

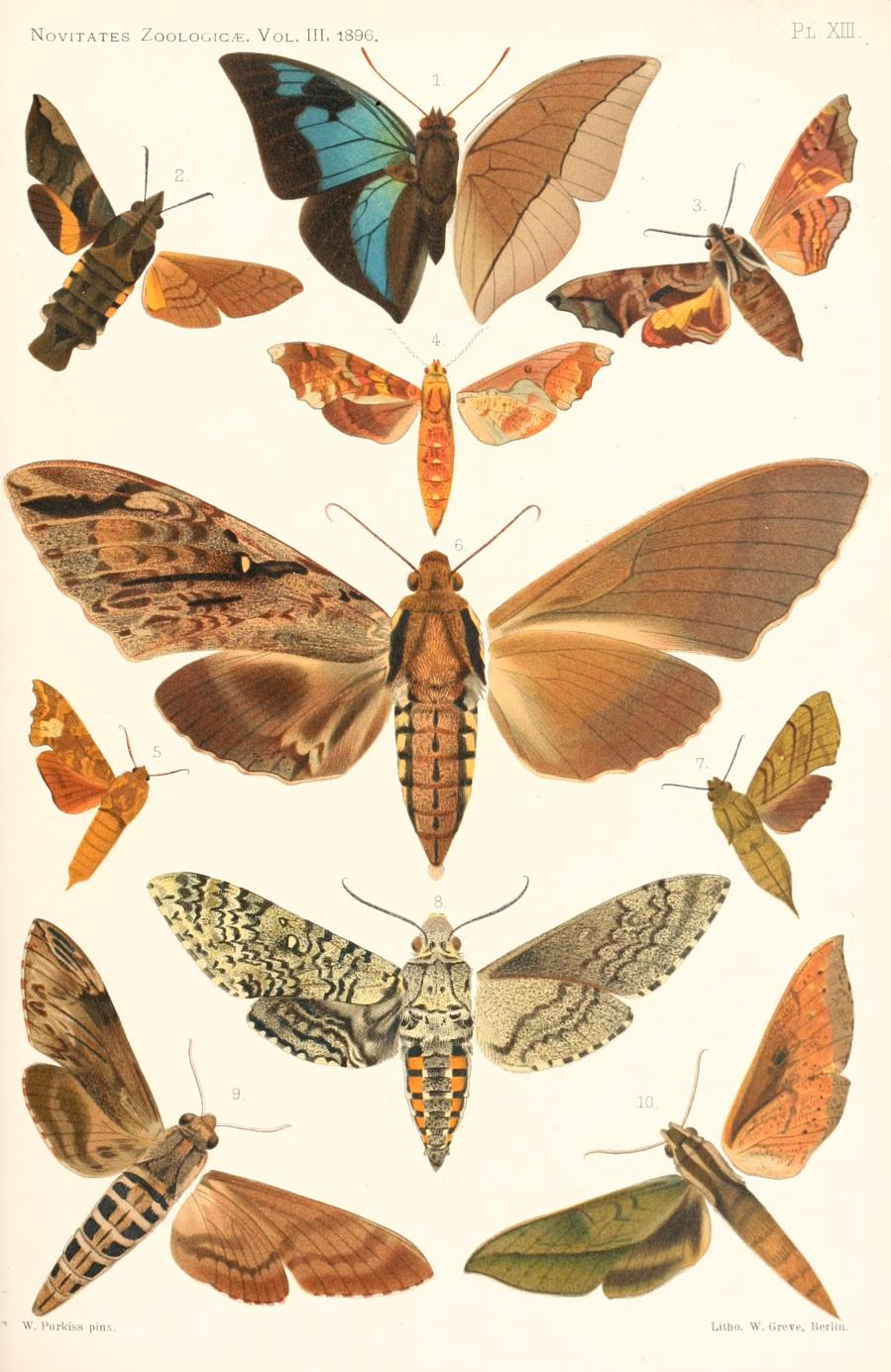
Anaeomorpha splendida Rothschild, 1894 Fig. 1 Plate accompanying description in NovitatesZoologicae

== Species ==
There is one species, Anaeomorpha splendida, and two subspecies:

- Anaeomorpha splendida splendida (Peru, Ecuador, Colombia)
- Anaeomorpha splendida esmeralda Attal & Büche, 2008 (southern Peru)

== Distribution ==
Anaeomorpha splendida is found in Peru, Ecuador and Colombia.

== Biogeographic realm ==
Neotropical realm

== Systematics ==
- ▼ Preponini
  - Anaeomorpha (sometimes in Anaeini), Noreppa, Palla
  - - Archaeoprepona
    - - Agrias
      - Prepona

Clade showing phylogenetics of Anaeomorpha.
