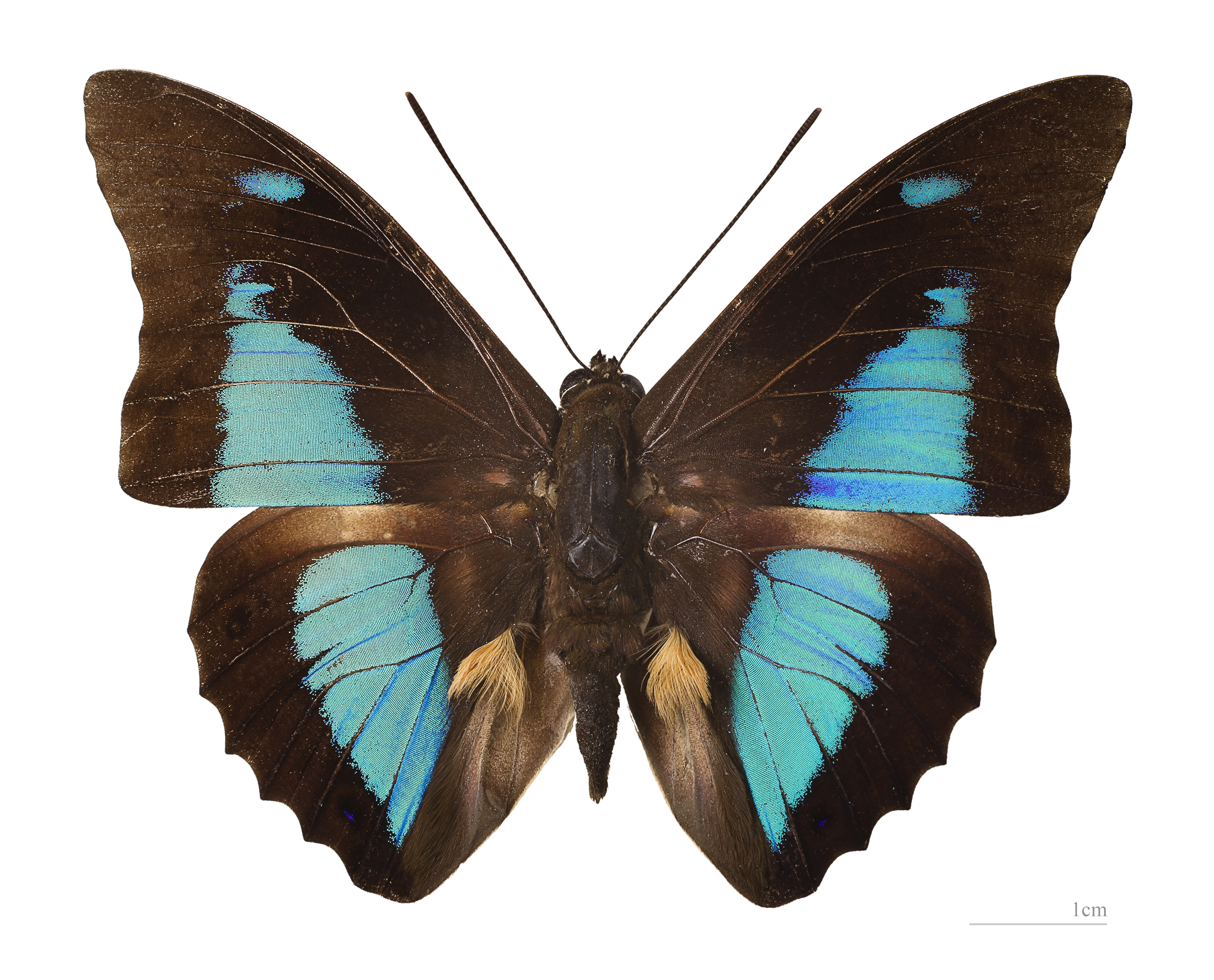
- Prepona laertes - MHNT

Scientific classification
- Kingdom: Animalia
- Phylum: Arthropoda
- Clade: Pancrustacea
- Class: Insecta
- Order: Lepidoptera
- Family: Nymphalidae
- Tribe: Preponini
- Genus: Prepona; Boisduval, 1836

Species
- About 25, see text

= Prepona =

Genus of brush-footed butterflies

Prepona is a genus of Neotropical charaxine butterflies in the family Nymphalidae. They are strong fliers in tropical forests where they feed on fermenting fruits and animal dung. The underside of the wings is pale greyish or brownish, while the upperside is dark with distinct iridescent blue markings. A few species also have orange markings on the upperside of the wings. They are popular among butterfly collectors.

Prepona deiphile is considered a threatened species in Minas Gerais state, Brazil.

== Description ==
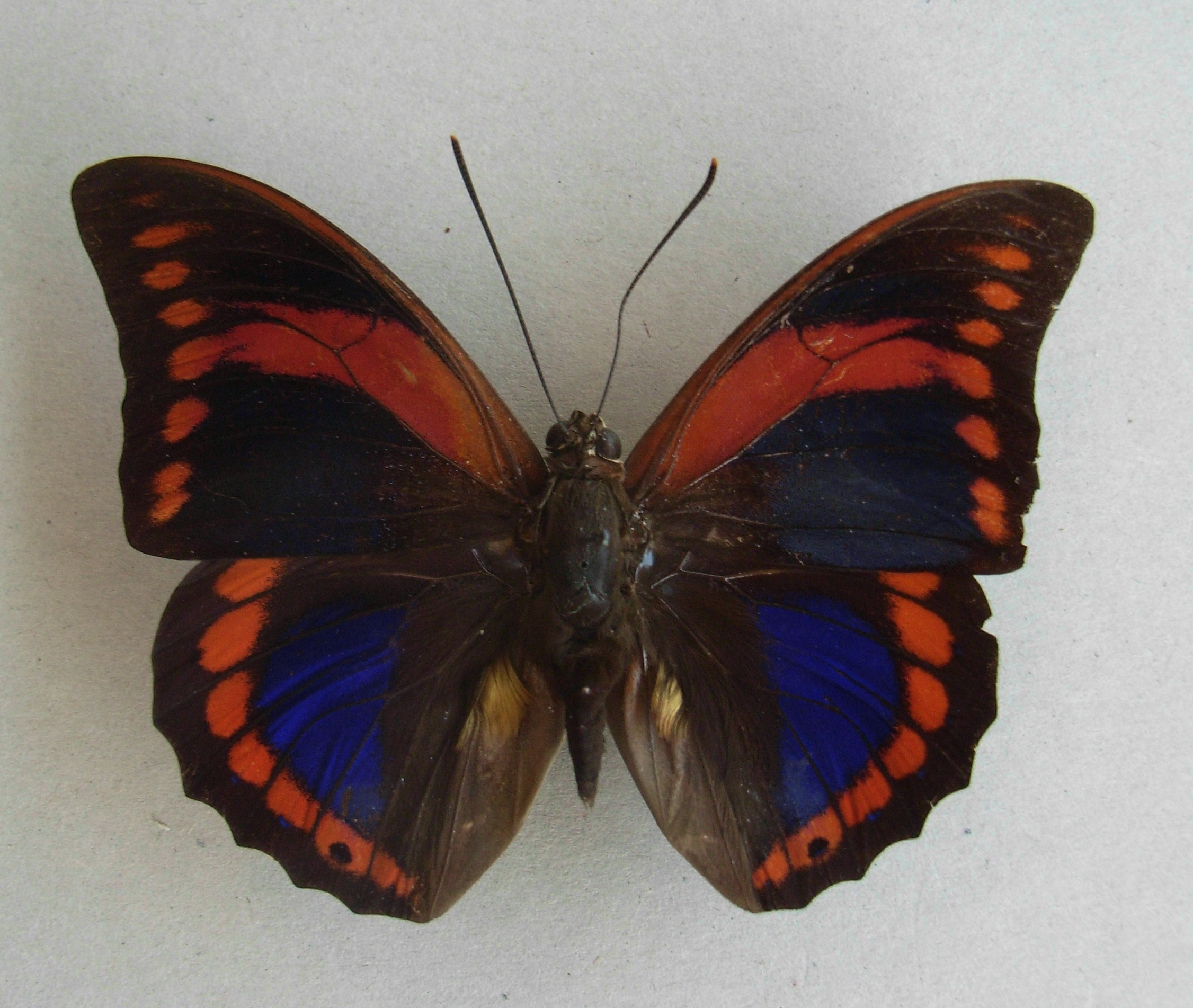
Prepona praeneste

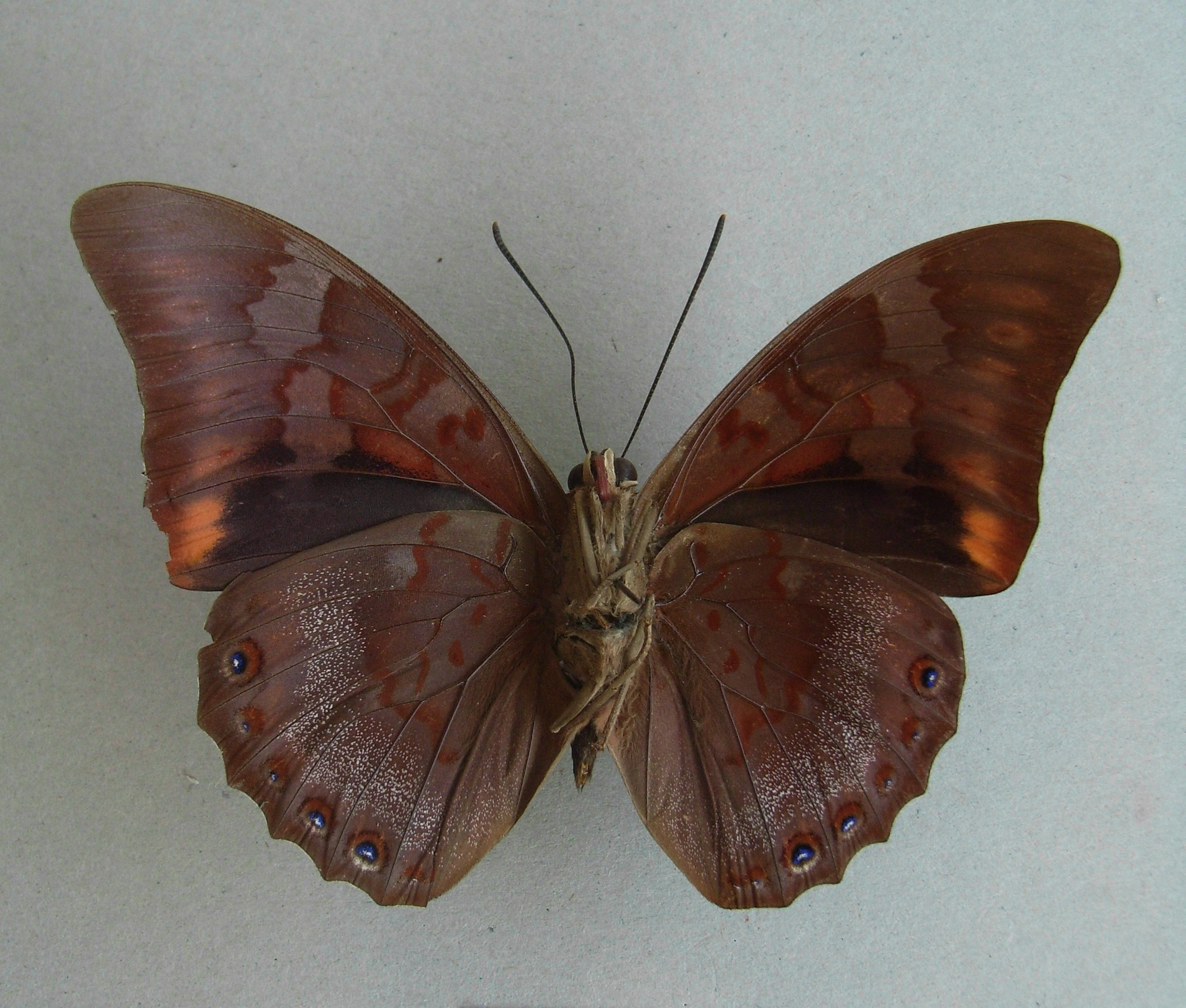
Prepona praeneste

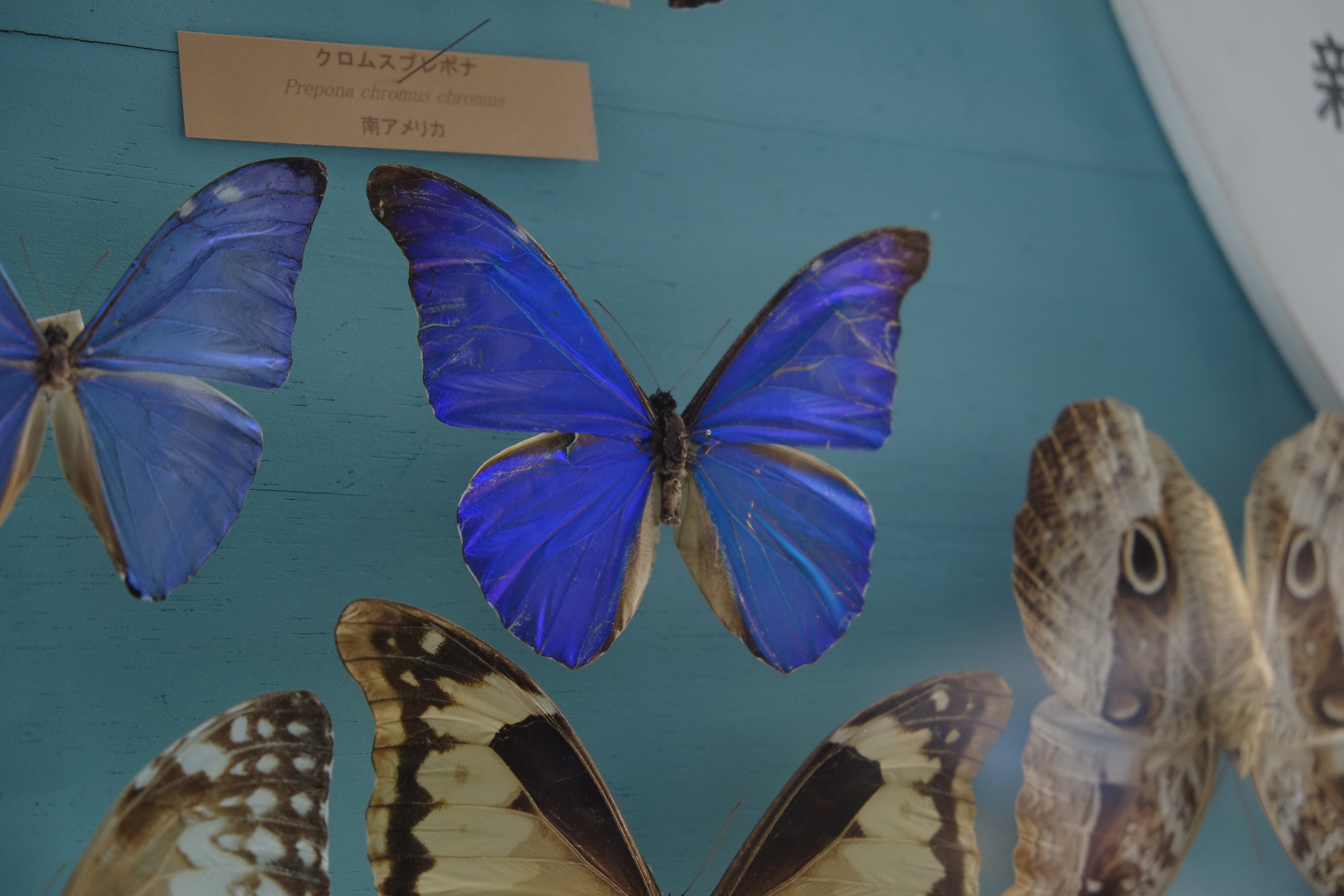
Prepona Chromus Chromus

"They are very robust insects, measuring four inches across the wings, which are broad and dentated, with the tip of the fore-wings much produced, but not falcate, the hind-margin being oblique and then nearly straight below; near the inner-margin of the hind-wings of the males stands a yellow tuft of stiff hair (androconial tuft), as in Agrias. The wings are black, and are generally crossed by a broad blue or greenish-blue band, often interrupted below the costa of the fore-wings. In some species the whole of the wings is suffused with rich purple; in others the blue band is confined to the hind-wings, and is reduced to a blue blotch. The most beautiful species is P. praeneste, Hewitson, from New Granada, which might easily be mistaken for an Agrias, but for the much broader fore-wings with the hind-margin concave. It is black, suffused with rich purple, and with a sub-marginal row of scarlet spots. From the base of the fore-wings runs a scarlet band, narrowly continued along the costa for three-fourths of its length, but, beyond the cell, continued in a broad curve to the band of spots at a point opposite the middle of the hind-margin. On the under side the Preponas are varied with different shades of brown and grey; sometimes there is a transverse black or white line, and very frequently a number of short irregular zig-zag lines towards the base. On the hind-wings beneath there is either a sub-marginal row of small eyes between the nervures, or two larger eyes, one towards the tip, and the other towards the anal angle; the latter is sometimes visible above. The larva and pupa resemble those of Apatura; and notwithstanding the strong and rapid flight of the Butterflies, they are not difficult to capture, as they have the habit of settling on projecting branches of trees, and are not easily alarmed". Description from William Forsell Kirby's A Hand-book to the Order Lepidoptera (1896).

The smooth, hairless larvae have a prominent thoracic hump which may be expanded to expose false eyespots. The colour is variously dark brown and pale brown. The head bears a pair of stout recurved horns and there is a bifid tail. The pupa is green or bluish green with irregular white spots resembling lichen. It is an ovoid shape with a prominent thoracic bulge. It is suspended by the cremaster from a leaf or twig.

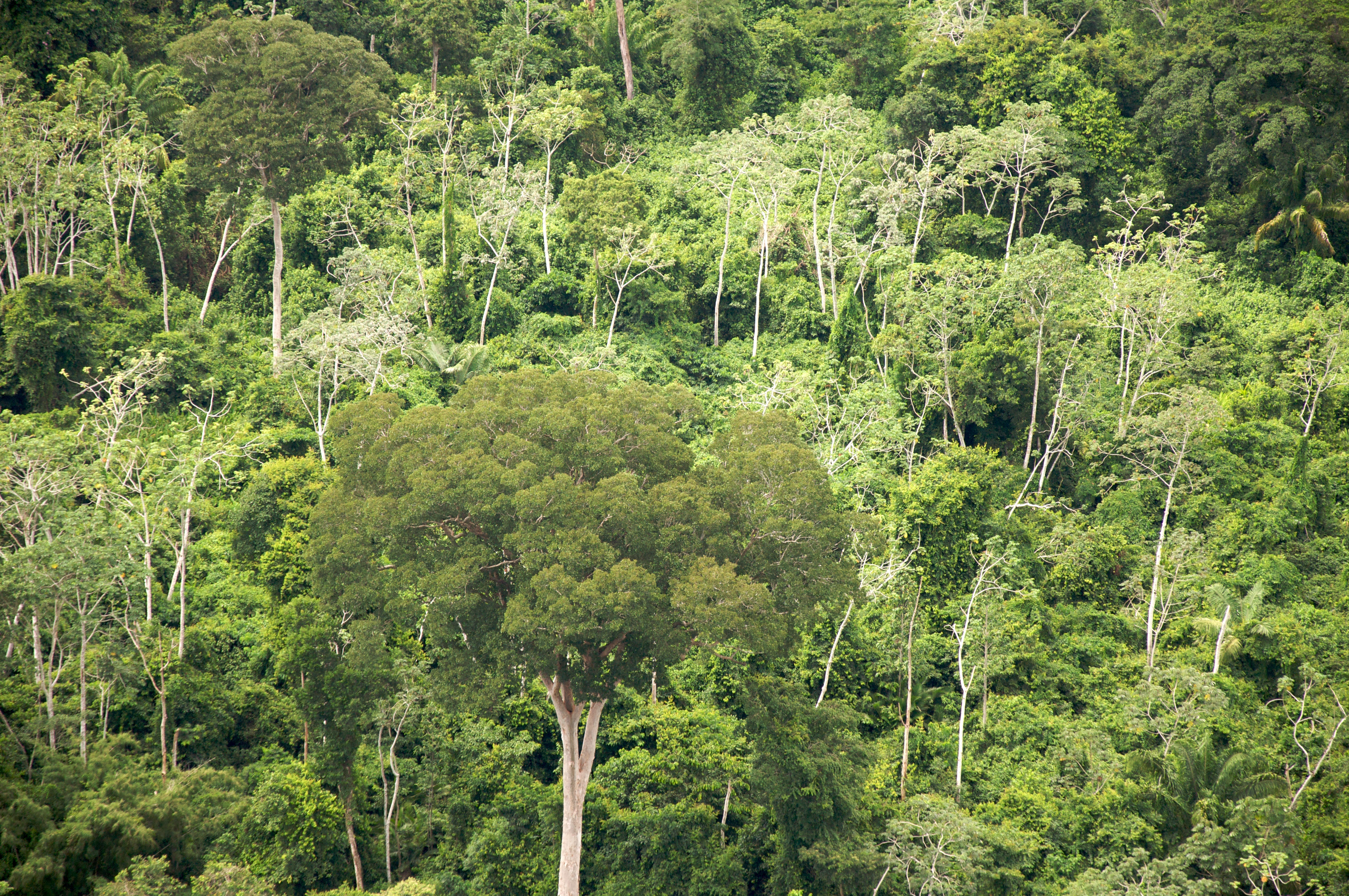
Rainforest in Santa Cruz, Bolivia

Prepona plate from Seitz, 1915. Some taxa (e.g. amphimachus) here placed in Prepona are now placed in Archaeoprepona

== Habitat ==
Rainforests.

== Taxonomy ==
The members of the genus Archaeoprepona were formerly also included in Prepona. Species included in Prepona:

- Prepona Boisduval, 1836
  - Prepona deiphile (Godart, [1824])
  - Prepona dexamenus Hopffer, 1874 – Dexamenus prepona
  - Prepona laertes (Hübner, 1811) – shaded-blue leafwing or Laertes prepona
  - Prepona pheridamas (Cramer, 1777) – pheridamas prepona
  - Prepona praeneste Hewitson, 1859
  - Prepona pylene Hewitson, 1853 – narrow-banded shoemaker or pylene prepona
  - Prepona werneri Hering & Hopp, 1925

== Systematics ==
- ▼ Preponini
  - Palla, Noreppa, Anaeomorpha (sometimes in Anaeini)
  - - Archaeoprepona
    - - Prepona
      - Agrias

Clade showing phylogenetics of Prepona.

== See also ==
- Archaeoprepona (sister genus). Many Archaeoprepona species were formerly placed in Prepona.
