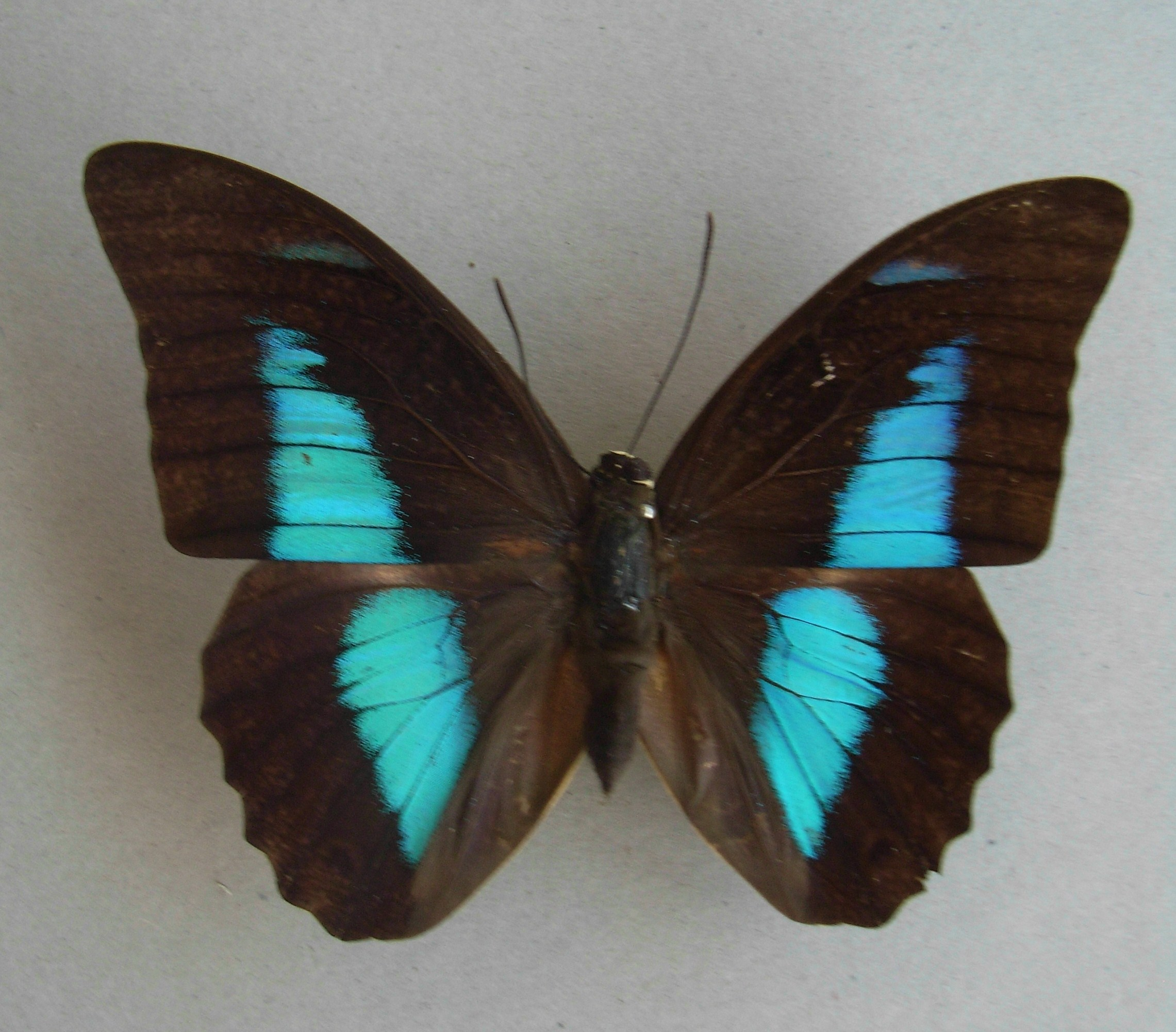
- Female
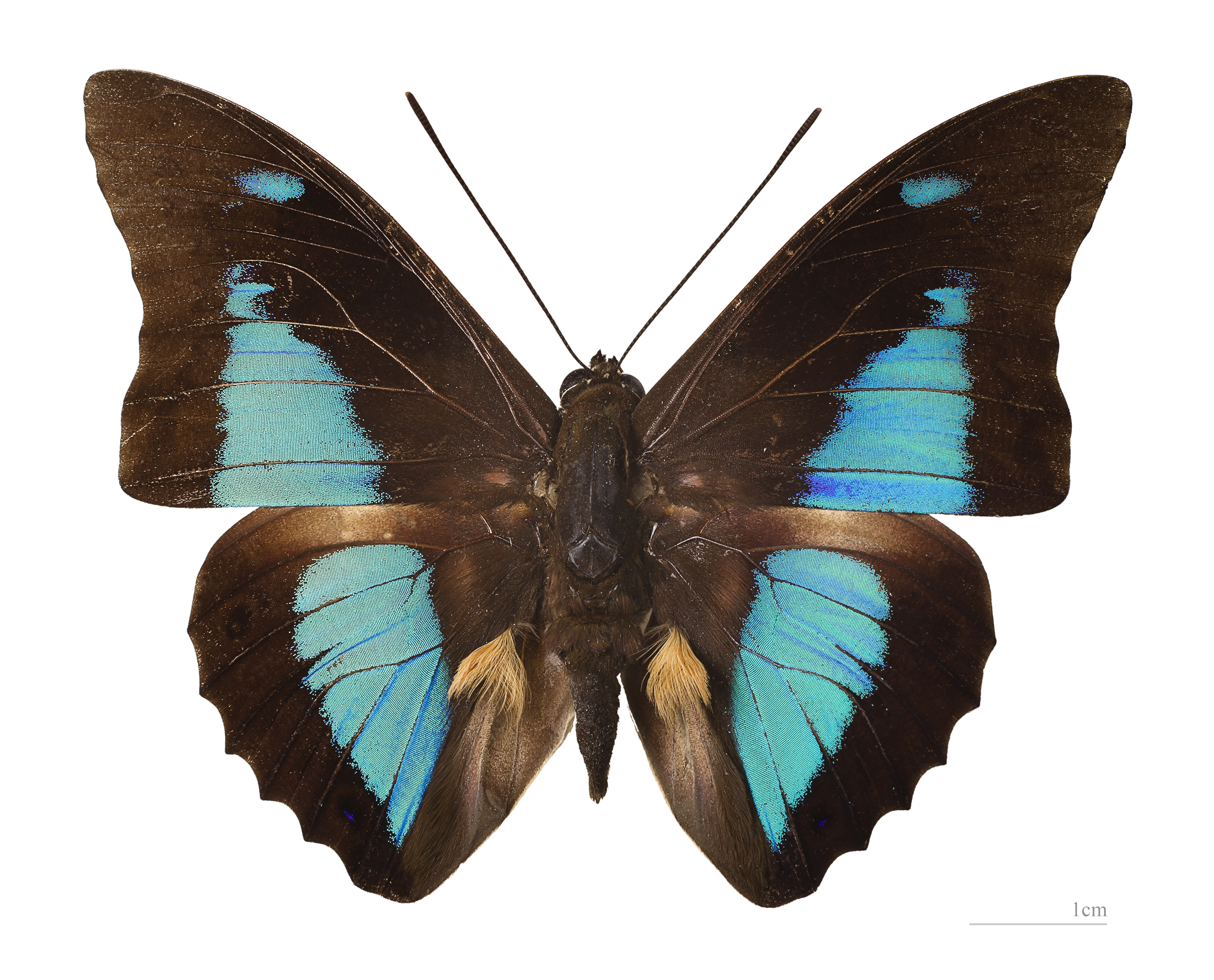
- Male

Scientific classification
- Kingdom: Animalia
- Phylum: Arthropoda
- Class: Insecta
- Order: Lepidoptera
- Family: Nymphalidae
- Genus: Prepona
- Species: P. laertes

Binomial name
- Prepona laertes (Hübner, [1811])

Synonyms
- Potamis superba laertes Hübner, [1811]; Morpho omphale Hübner, [1819]; Prepona omphale; Prepona laertes pallidior Fruhstorfer, 1904; Nymphalis demodice Godart, [1824]; Prepona laertes ikarios Fruhstorfer, 1904; Prepona laertes penelope Fruhstorfer, 1904; Prepona laertes pallantias Fruhstorfer, 1916; Prepona laertes agathus Fruhstorfer, 1916; Prepona omphale renea Fruhstorfer, 1916; Prepona omphale abulonia Fruhstorfer, 1916; Prepona omphale devioletta Fassl, 1922; Prepona lesounderi Le Moult, 1932; Prepona laertes guaraunes Le Moult, 1932; Prepona joiceyi heringi Le Moult, 1932; Prepona joiceyi bouvieri Le Moult, 1932; Prepona joiceyi poleti Le Moult, 1932; Prepona [joiceyi] paraensis Le Moult, 1932; Prepona joiceyi pebana Le Moult, 1932; Prepona joiceyi tapajona Le Moult, 1932; Prepona pseudojoiceyi Le Moult, 1932; Prepona omphale smithi Le Moult, 1932; Prepona omphala moureaui Le Moult, 1932; Prepona philipponi Le Moult, 1932; Prepona philipponi maroniensis Le Moult, 1932; Prepona rothschildi Le Moult, 1932; Prepona rothschildi amazonica Le Moult, 1932 (preocc. Staudindger, 1886); Prepona rothschildi cuyabensis Le Moult, 1932; Prepona lilianae Le Moult, 1932; Prepona lilianae blanci Le Moult, 1932; Prepona pseudomphale Le Moult, 1932; Prepona pseudomphale decellei Le Moult, 1932; Prepona pseudomphale foucheri Le Moult, 1932; Prepona pseudomphale guiensis Le Moult, 1932; Prepona pseudomphale yahnas Le Moult, 1932; Prepona pseudomphale talboti Le Moult, 1932; Prepona pseudomphale buenavista Le Moult, 1932; Morpho laertes Fabricius, 1938 (preocc. Hübner, [1811]); Prepona rothschildi homonyma Bryk, 1939; Prepona joiceyi Le Moult, 1932; Prepona joiceyi overlaeti Le Moult, 1932; Prepona joiceyi pseudodives Le Moult, 1932; Prepona pseudojoiceyi trinitensis Le Moult, 1932; Prepona rothschildi venezuelensis Le Moult, 1932; Prepona pseudomphale orinocensis Le Moult, 1932; Prepona omphale amesia Fruhstorfer, 1905; Prepona joiceyi naranjensis Le Moult, 1932; Prepona pseudojoiceyi apollinari Le Moult, 1932; Prepona pseudojoiceyi fonquerniei Le Moult, 1932; Prepona pseudojoiceyi hondurensis Le Moult, 1932; Prepona pseudojoiceyi draudti Le Moult, 1932; Prepona omphale subdives Le Moult, 1932; Prepona omphale caucensis Le Moult, 1932; Prepona omphale aquacensis Le Moult, 1932; Prepona omphale guatemalensis Le Moult, 1932; Prepona omphale panamensis Le Moult, 1932; Prepona omphale schausi Le Moult, 1932; Prepona pseudomphale lichyi Le Moult, 1932; Prepona subomphale Le Moult, 1932

= Prepona laertes =

Species of butterfly

Prepona laertes, the shaded-blue leafwing or Laertes prepona, is a butterfly of the family Nymphalidae. It is found in large parts of Central and South America.

The wingspan is about 88 mm. It is a very variable species and a great number of subspecies and forms have been described. Most of these are now considered synonyms.

The larvae feed on Inga vera, Inga ruiziana and Andira inermis.

== Subspecies ==
- Prepona laertes laertes (Paraguay)
- Prepona laertes demodice (Godard, [1824]) (French Guiana, Brazil, Surinam, Bolivia, Costa Rica, Colombia, Peru, Ecuador, Bolivia)
- Prepona laertes louisa Butler, 1870 (Colombia, Venezuela, Trinidad)
- Prepona laertes octavia Fruhstorfer, 1905 (Honduras, Colombia, Guatemala, Mexico, Panama, Ecuador)

== Gallery ==
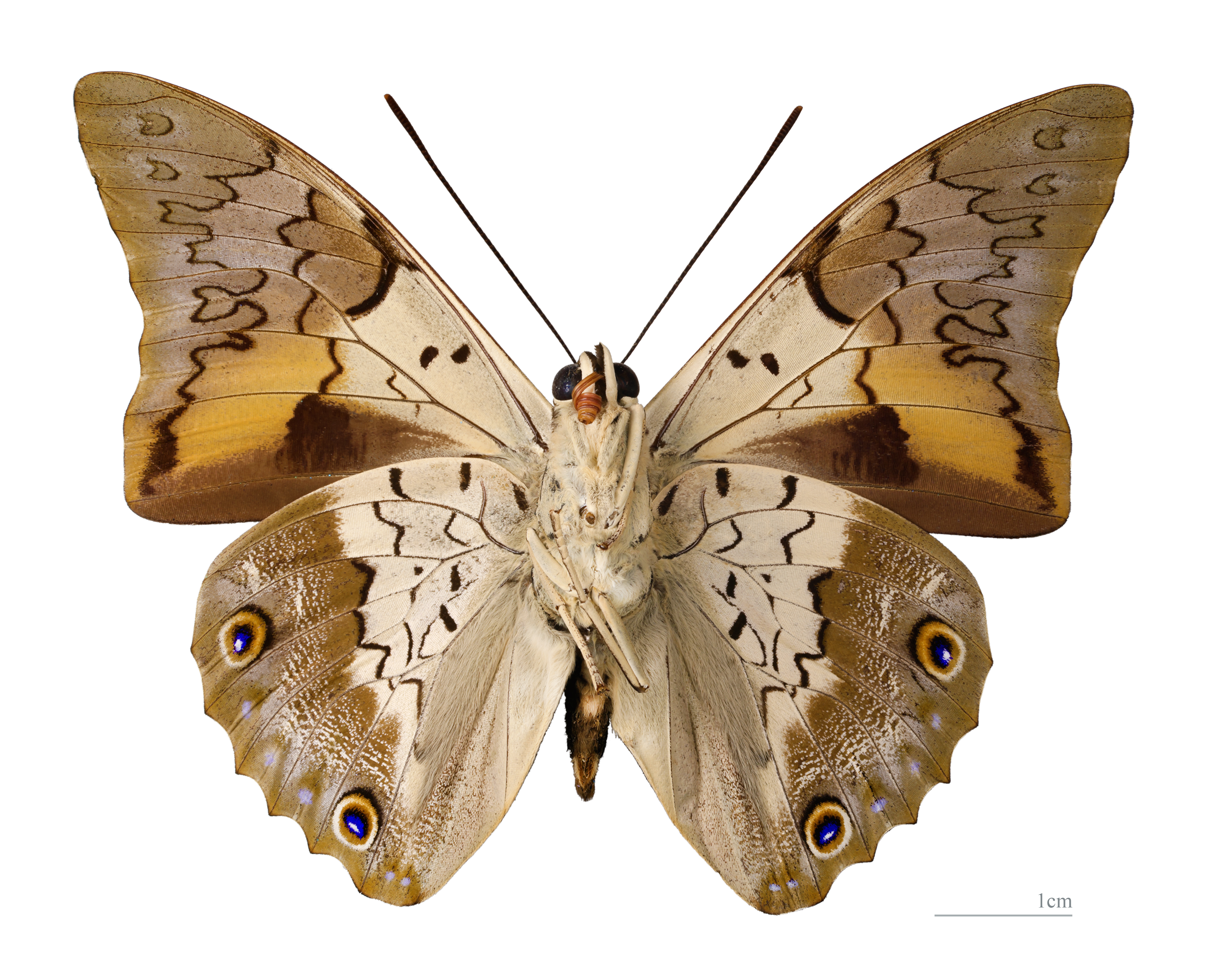
Male, underside

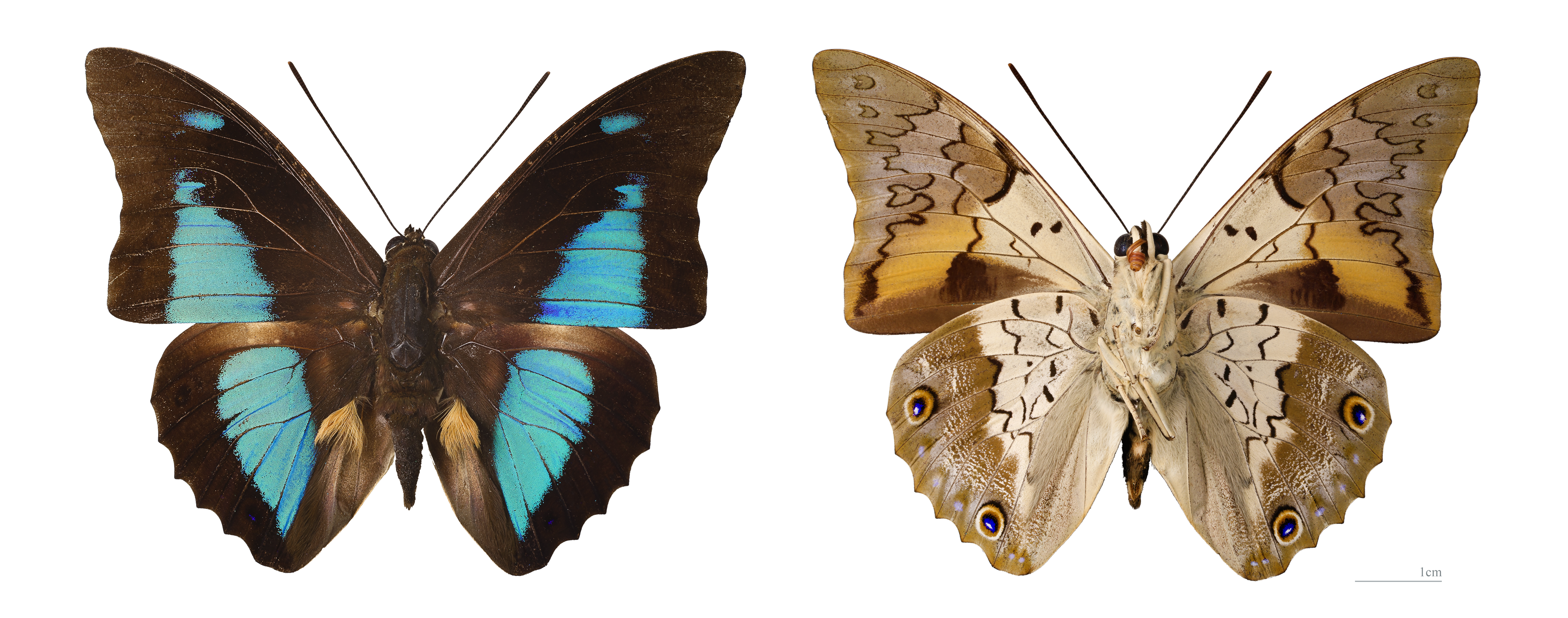
Prepona laertes laertes male

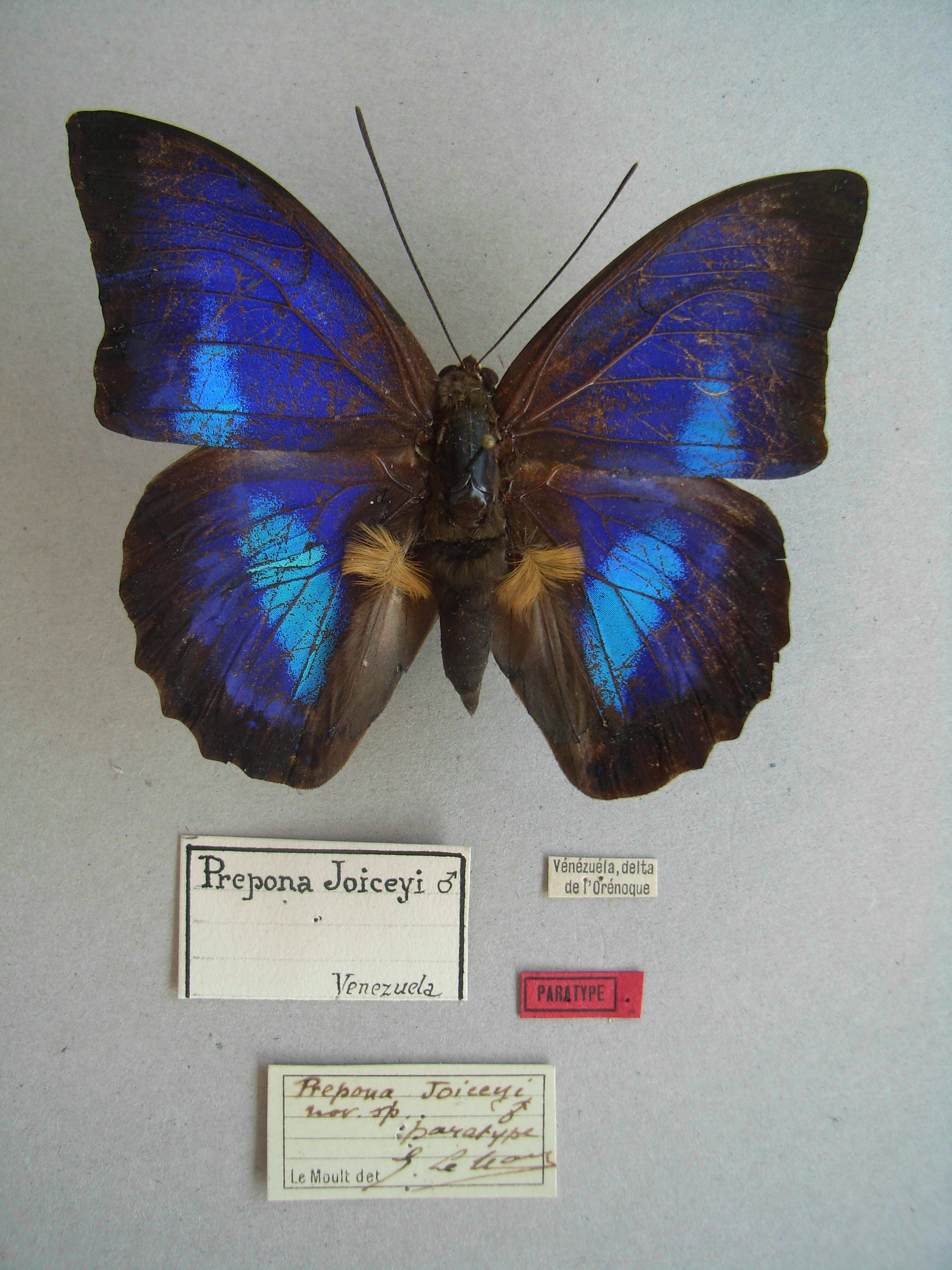
Prepona laertes demodice

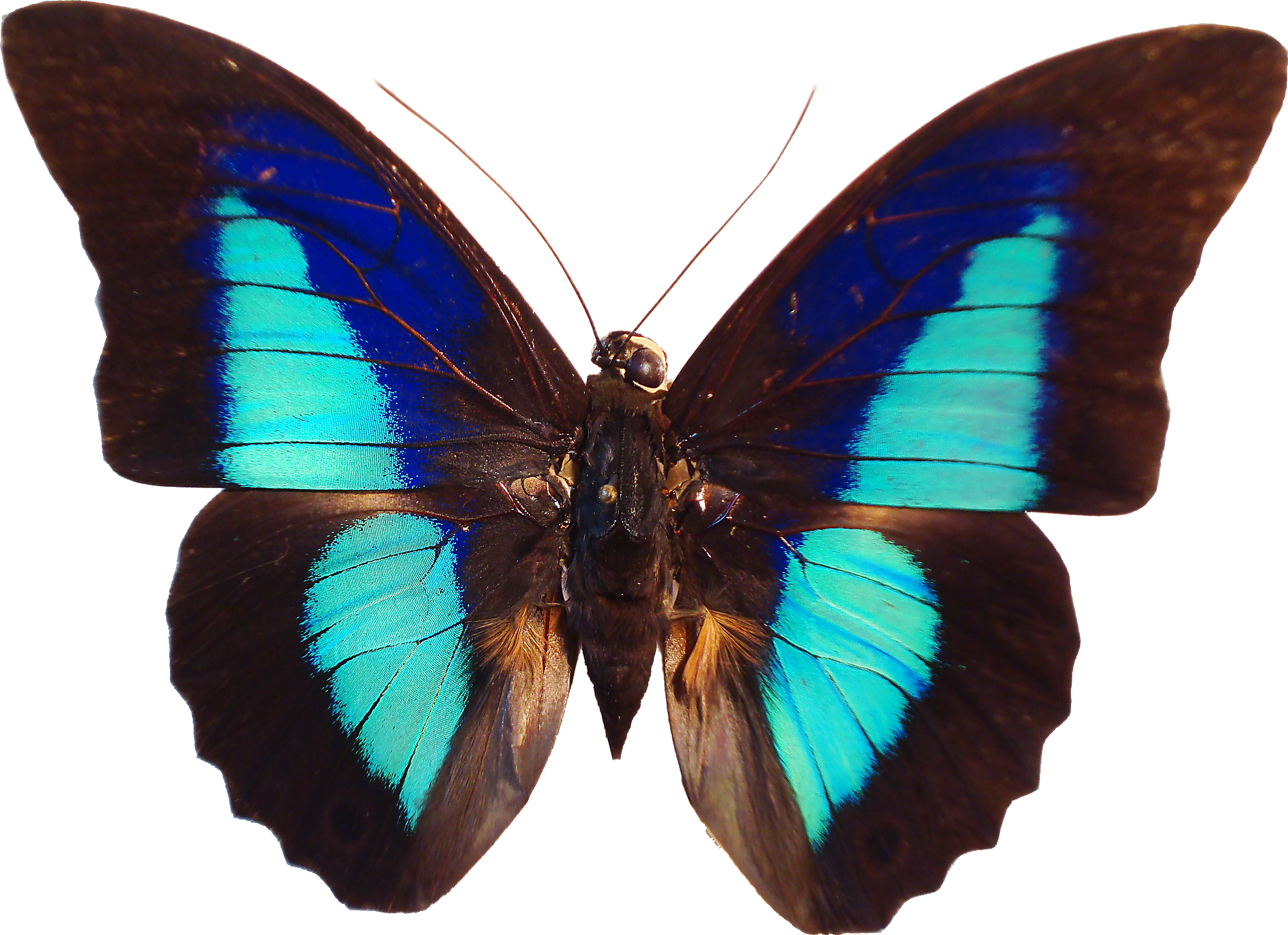
Prepona laertes octavia
