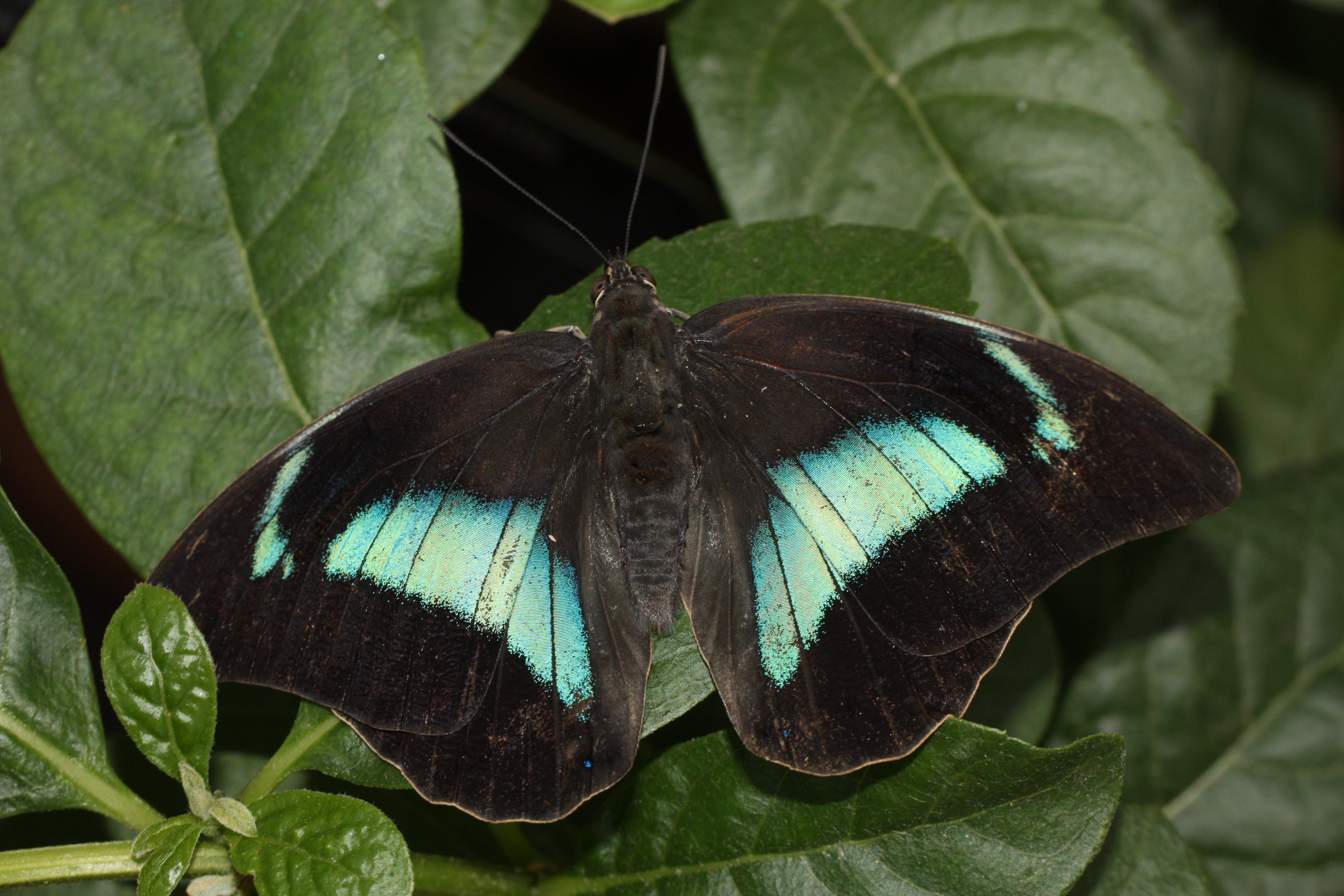
- Dorsal
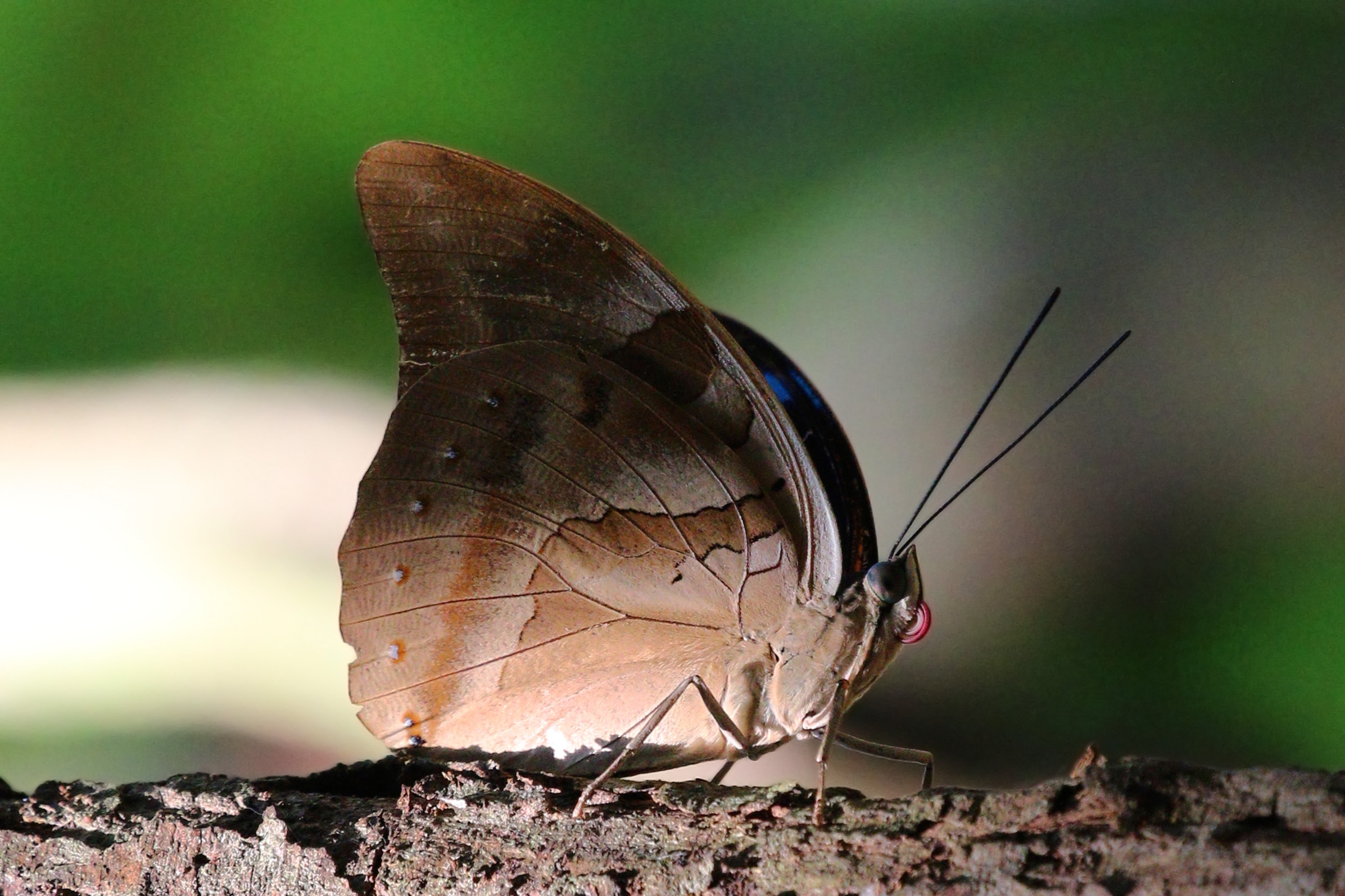
- Ventral, Cristalino River; Southern Amazon, Brazil

Scientific classification
- Kingdom: Animalia
- Phylum: Arthropoda
- Class: Insecta
- Order: Lepidoptera
- Family: Nymphalidae
- Genus: Archaeoprepona
- Species: A. demophon

Binomial name
- Archaeoprepona demophon (Linnaeus, 1758)

Synonyms
- Papilio demophon Linnaeus, 1758; Prepona demophon; Papilio luctuosus Walch, 1775; Papilio sysiphus Cramer, [1777]; Morpho sysiphe Hübner, [1819]; Prepona catachlora Staudinger, 1886

= Archaeoprepona demophon =

Species of butterfly

Archaeoprepona demophon, the one-spotted prepona, banded king shoemaker, or demophon shoemaker is a butterfly belonging to the family Nymphalidae.

== Description ==
The wingspan reaches about 54–58 millimetres (2.1–2.3 in). The uppersides of the wings are black, with bright pale blue transverse bands. The undersides are pale brown with a clearer band in the middle of the hindwings and several dark small dots on the margins.

== Foodplants ==
The butterfly larva generally feed on plants of the genus Annona (Annonaceae) and on Malpighia glabra (Malpighiaceae). Adults visit rotten fruit or dung.

== Distribution ==
This species can be found in Mexico, Central America, the West Indies, and northern portions of South America.

== Habitat ==
Archaeoprepona demophon prefers the edges of forest canopy and subcanopy.

== Gallery ==
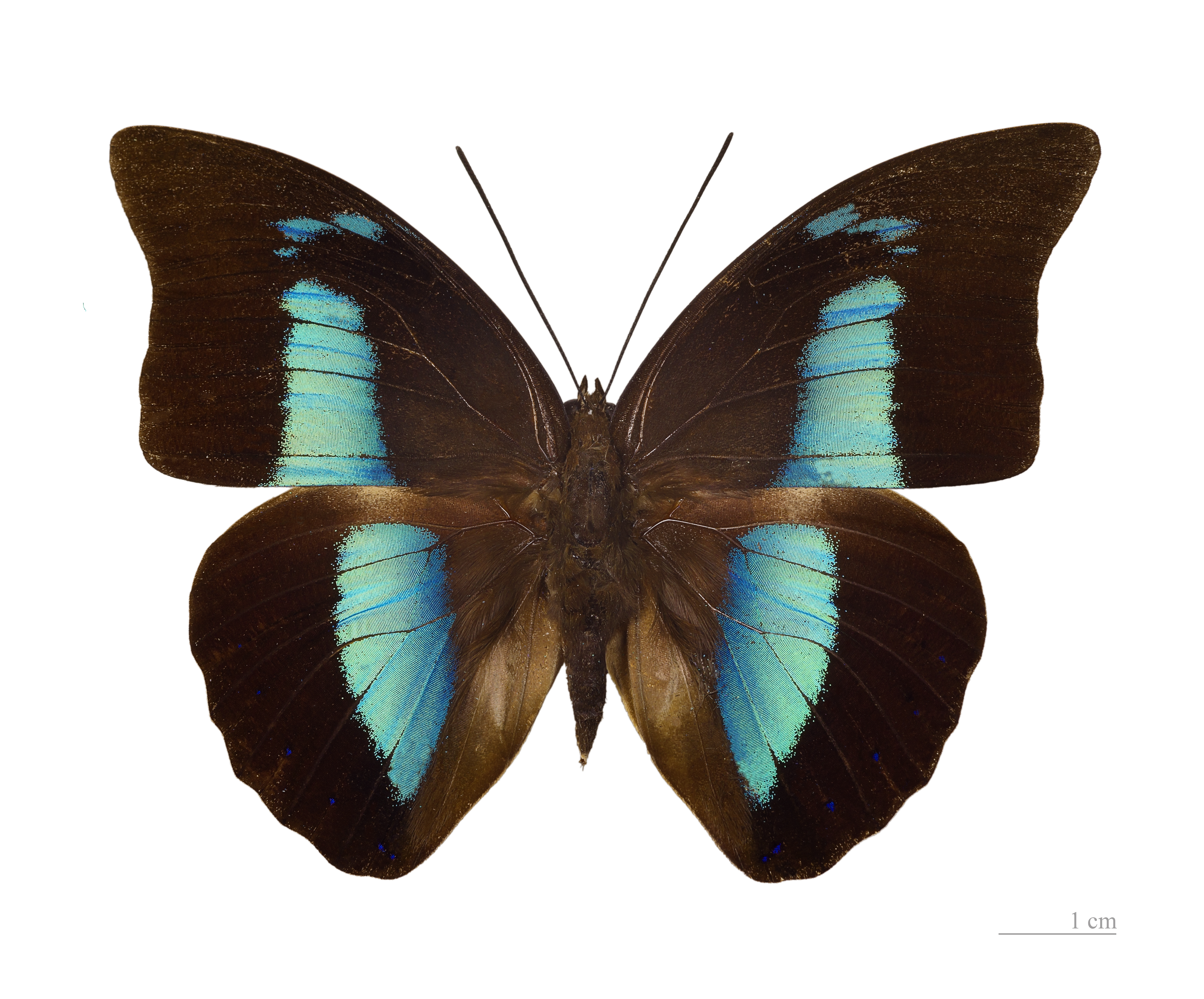
Archaeoprepona demophon demophon – dorsal view

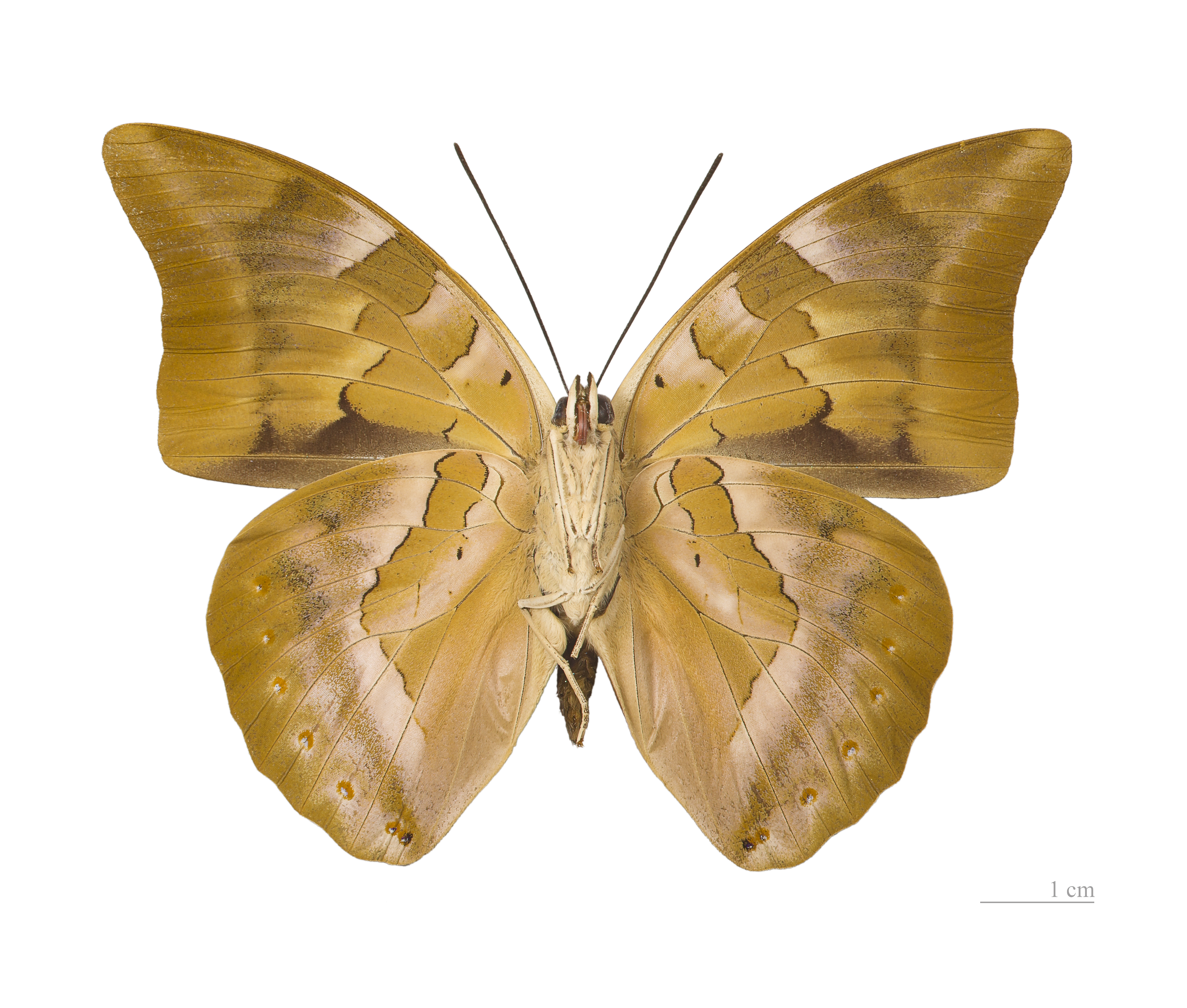
Archaeoprepona demophon demophon - ventral view

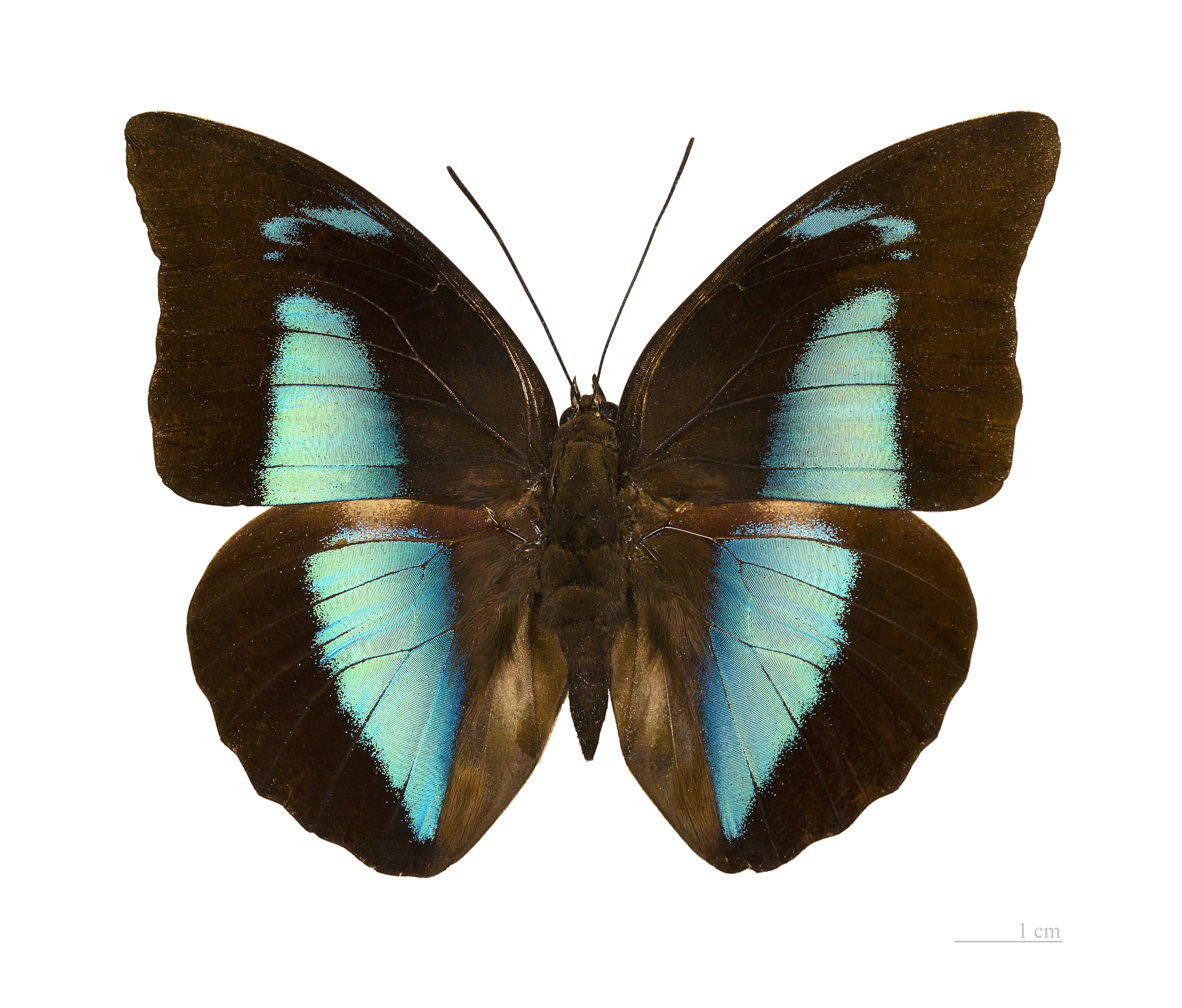
Archaeoprepona demophon muson male - dorsal view

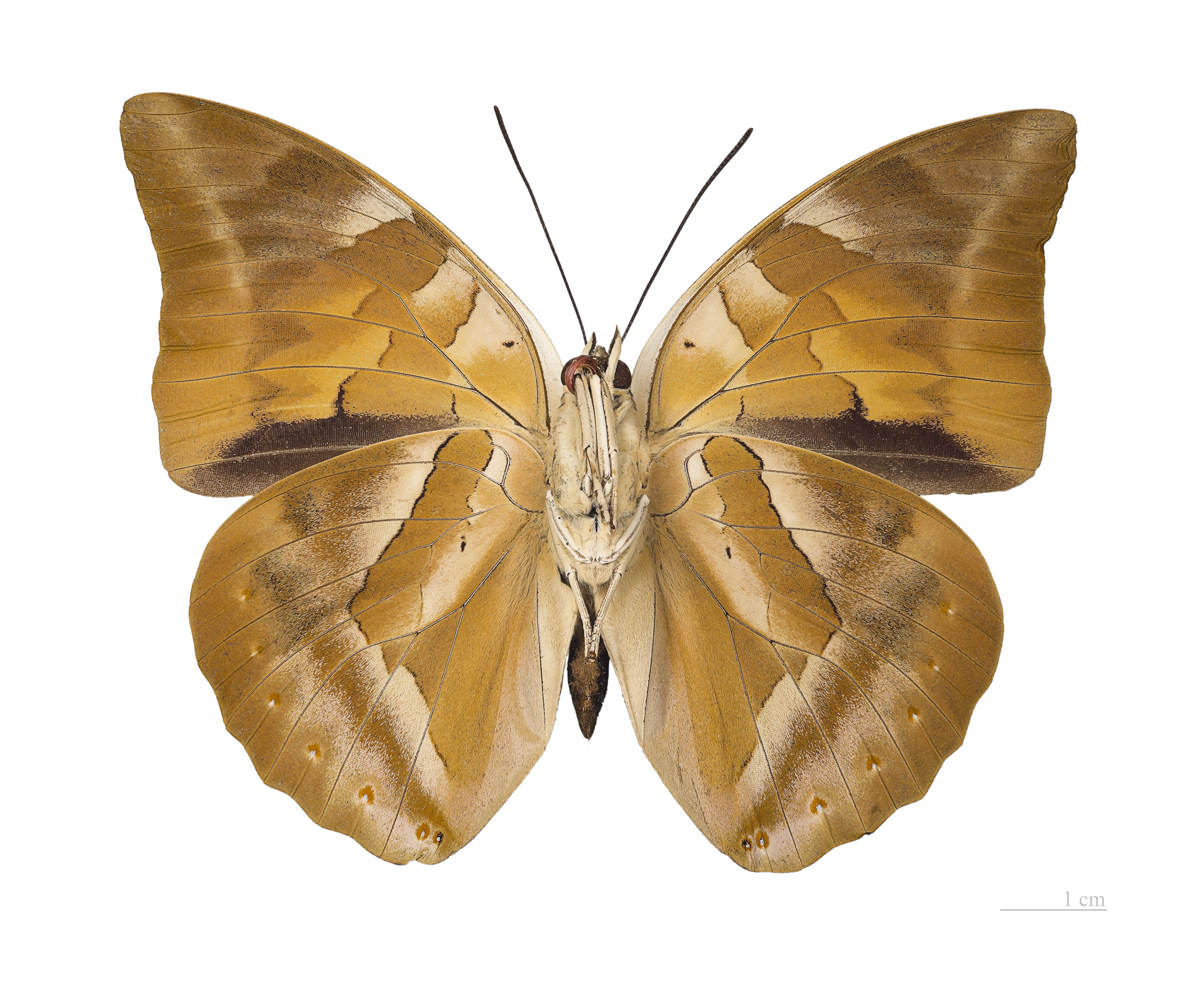
Archaeoprepona demophon muson male - ventral view

== Subspecies ==
- Archaeoprepona demophon demophon (Linnaeus, 1758) – Surinam
- Archaeoprepona demophon extincta (Staudinger, 1886) – Brazil (D.F.)
- Archaeoprepona demophon centralis (Fruhstorfer, [1905]) – Mexico, Honduras, to Panama
- Archaeoprepona demophon muson (Fruhstorfer, 1905) – Colombia, Ecuador, Bolivia
- Archaeoprepona demophon occidentalis (Stoffel & Descimon, 1974) – Mexico
- Archaeoprepona demophon thalpius (Hübner, [1814]) – Brazil (Santa Catarina, Minas Gerais, Espírito Santo, Bahia, Rio Grande do Sul))
