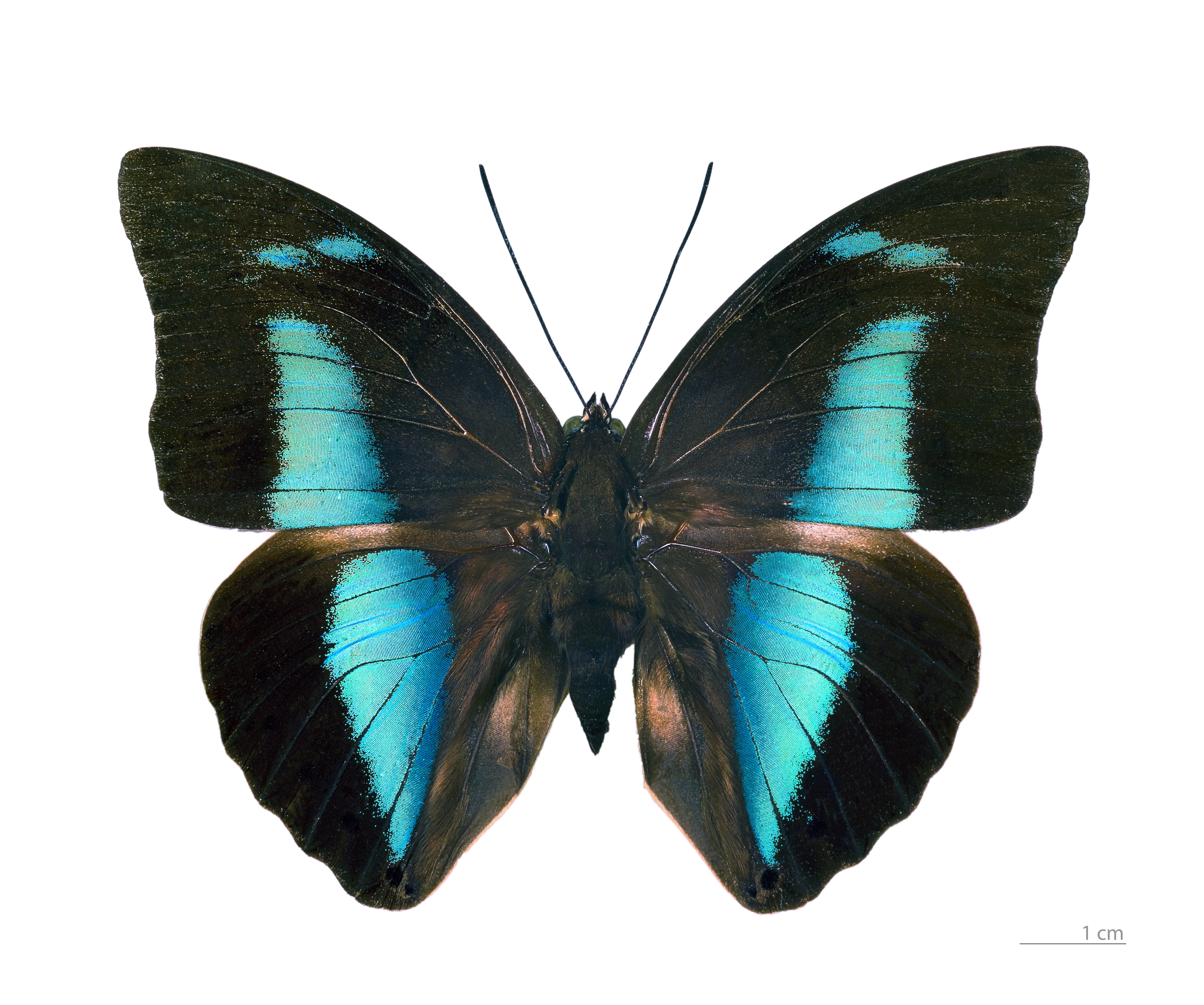
- Archaeoprepona amphimachus – Dorsal side
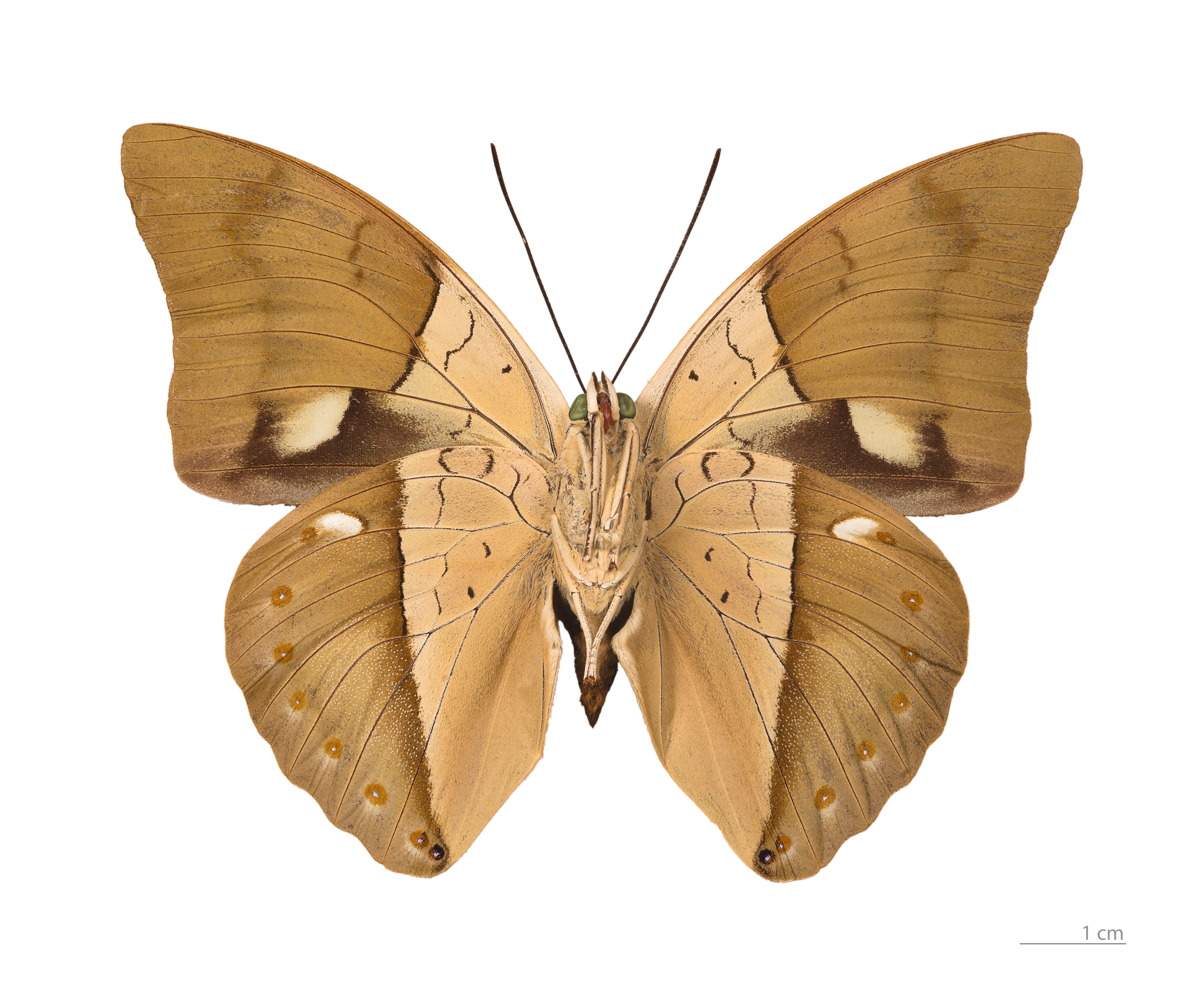
- Archaeoprepona amphimachus – Ventral side

Scientific classification
- Kingdom: Animalia
- Phylum: Arthropoda
- Clade: Pancrustacea
- Class: Insecta
- Order: Lepidoptera
- Family: Nymphalidae
- Genus: Archaeoprepona
- Species: A. amphimachus

Binomial name
- Archaeoprepona amphimachus (Fabricius, 1775)

Synonyms
- Papilio amphimachus Fabricius, 1775; Morpho amphimache Hübner, [1819]; Prepona fruhstorferi Röber, 1914; Prepona falcata Röber, 1914; Prepona soron Fruhstorfer, 1914

= Archaeoprepona amphimachus =

White-spotted prepona

Species of butterfly

Archaeoprepona amphimachus, the white-spotted prepona, is a butterfly in the family Nymphalidae. It is found from Mexico to Bolivia. It is found in rainforests and humid deciduous forests at altitudes between sea level and about 1,500 meters.

== Subspecies ==
- Archaeoprepona amphimachus amphimachus
- Archaeoprepona amphimachus pseudmeander (Brazil)
- Archaeoprepona amphimachus amphiktion (Honduras, Mexico)
- Archaeoprepona amphimachus symaithus (Ecuador, Bolivia, Brazil)
- Archaeoprepona amphimachus baroni (Mexico)
