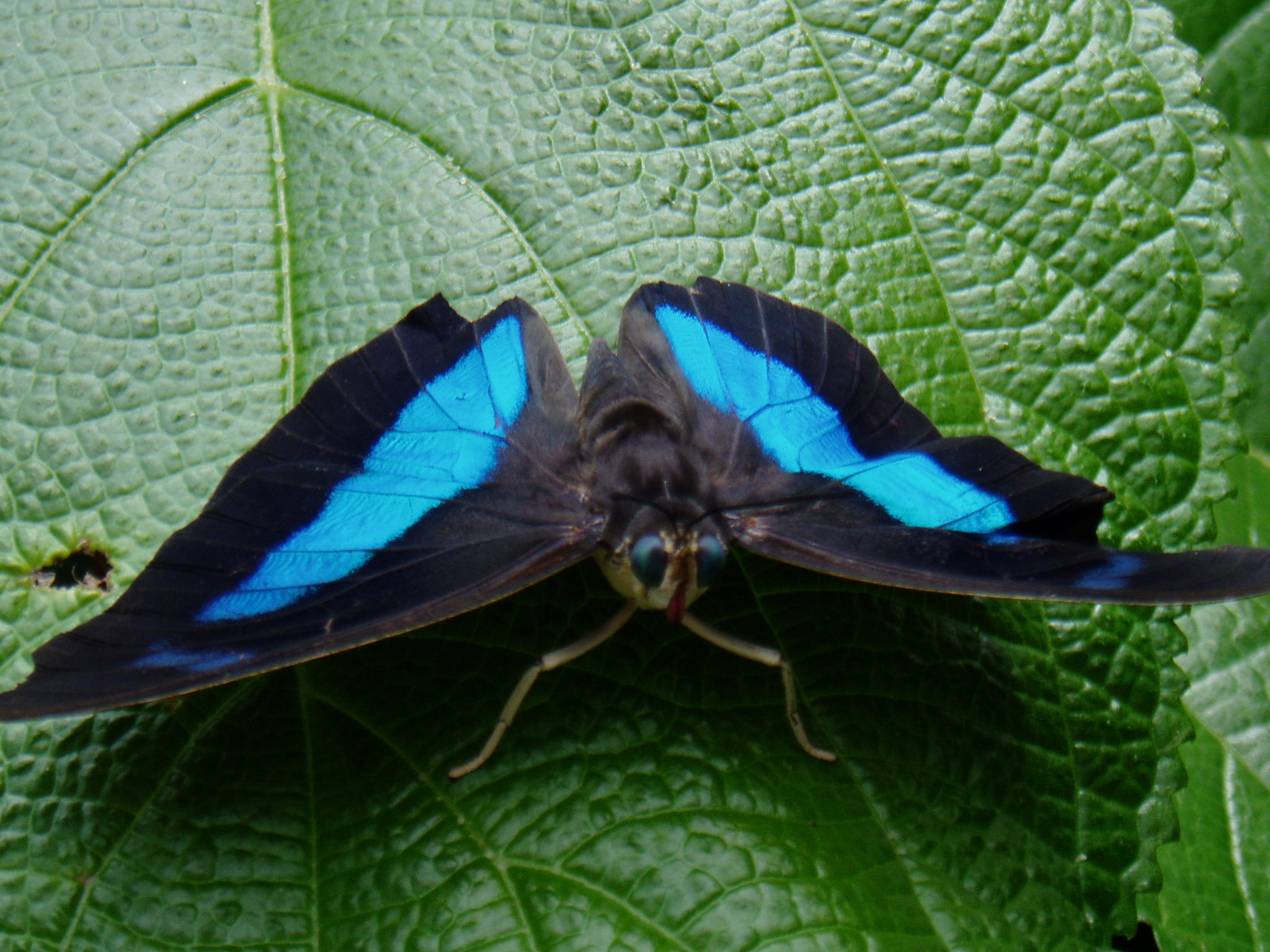
- One-spotted prepona (A. demophon) dorsal
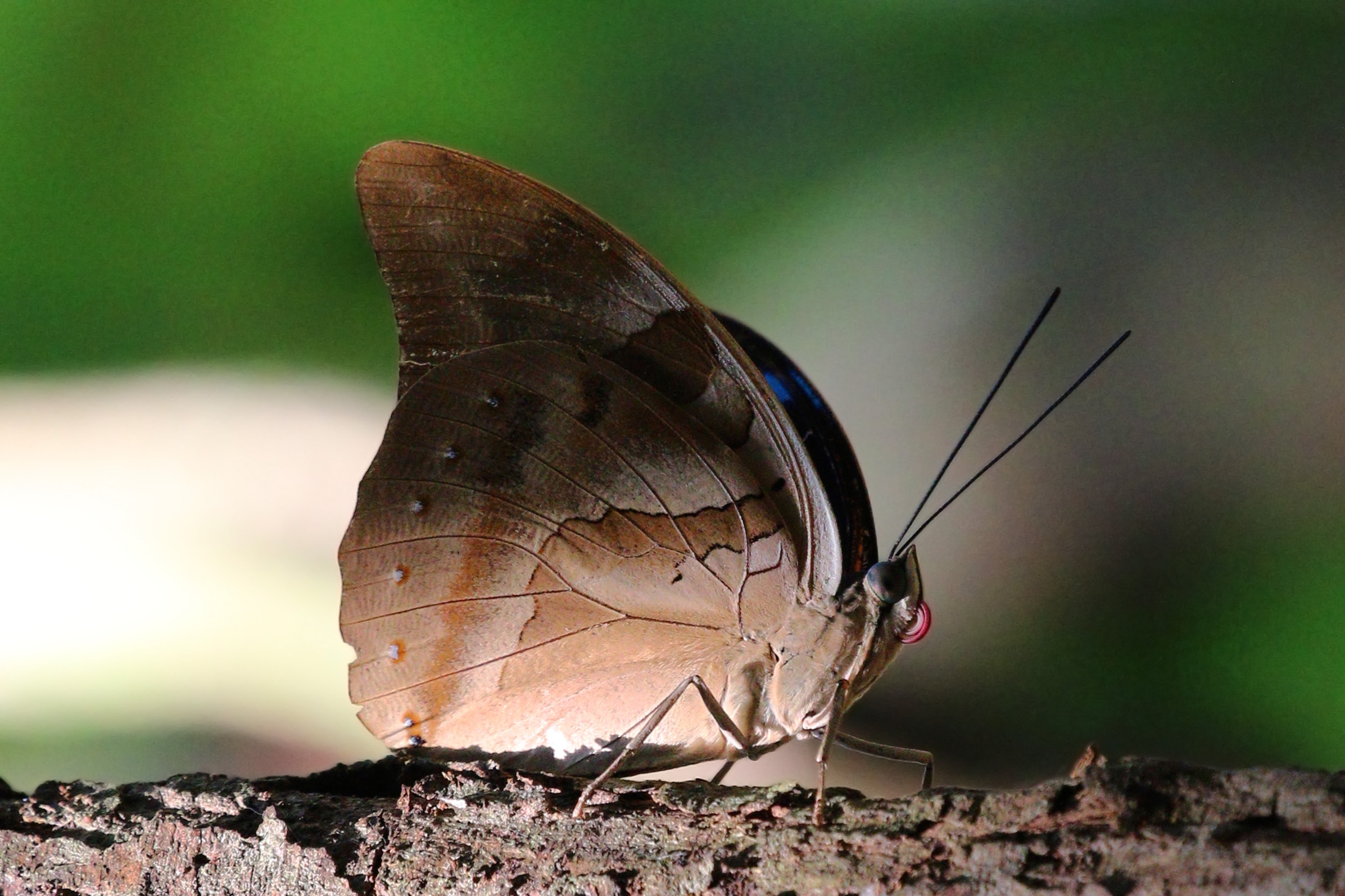
- A. demophon ventral, Cristalino River; Southern Amazon, Brazil

Scientific classification
- Domain: Eukaryota
- Kingdom: Animalia
- Phylum: Arthropoda
- Class: Insecta
- Order: Lepidoptera
- Family: Nymphalidae
- Tribe: Preponini
- Genus: Archaeoprepona (Fruhstorfer, 1915)

Type species
- Papilio demophon Linnaeus, 1758

Species
- See text

Synonyms
- Pseudoprepona Le Moult, 1932

= Archaeoprepona =

Genus of brush-footed butterflies

Archaeoprepona is a genus of Neotropical charaxine butterflies in the family Nymphalidae, native to Mexico, Central America, northern South America, and the Caribbean. The underside of their wings is pale brownish, while the upperside is dark with a distinct bright blue band.

== Taxonomy ==
Most taxa were described before Hans Fruhstorfer coined the genus Archaeoprepona in 1916, and were therefore originally placed in other genera. This includes the type species of the genus, Archaeoprepona demophon, first described as Papilio demophon by Carl Linnaeus. Even after the description of the genus Archaeoprepona, the members have commonly been included in Prepona instead.

Species in the genus Archaeoprepona:

- Archaeoprepona Fruhstorfer, 1915
  - Archaeoprepona amphimachus (Fabricius, 1775) – white-spotted prepona or turquoise-banded shoemaker
  - Archaeoprepona camilla (Godman & Salvin, [1884])
  - Archaeoprepona chalciope (Hübner, [1823])
  - Archaeoprepona demophon (Linnaeus, 1758) – one-spotted prepona, banded king shoemaker
  - Archaeoprepona demophoon (Hübner, [1814]) – Hübner's shoemaker, silver king shoemaker
  - Archaeoprepona licomedes (Cramer, [1777]) – Cramer's shoemaker
  - Archaeoprepona meander (Cramer, [1775]) – Meander prepona
  - Archaeoprepona phaedra (Godman & Salvin, [1884])

== Biogeographic realm ==
Neotropical realm

== Systematics ==
- ▼ Preponini
  - Anaeomorpha (sometimes in Anaeini), Noreppa, Palla
  - - Archaeoprepona
    - - Agrias
      - Prepona

Clade showing phylogenetics of Archaeoprepona

== Etymology ==
Amphimachus is a figure in Greek mythology.

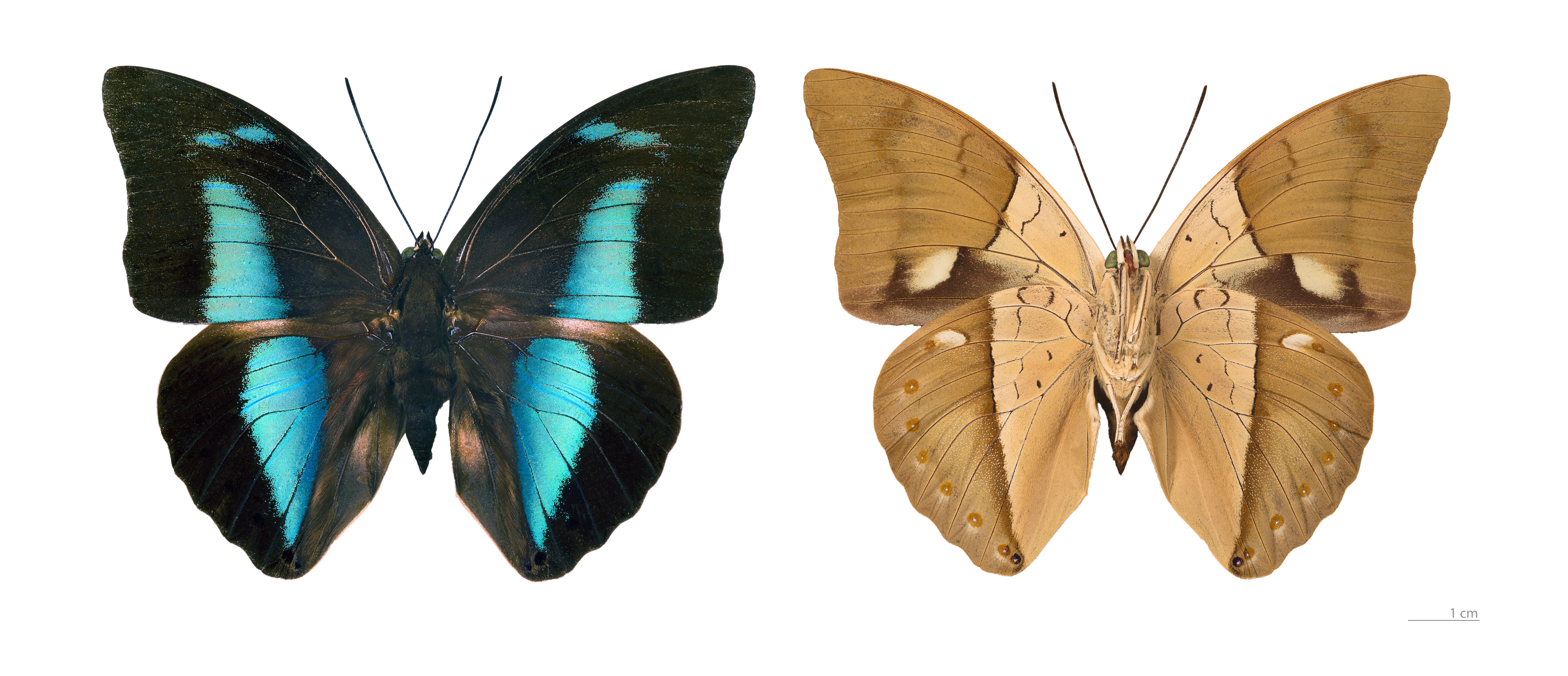
Archaeoprepona amphimachus - both sides

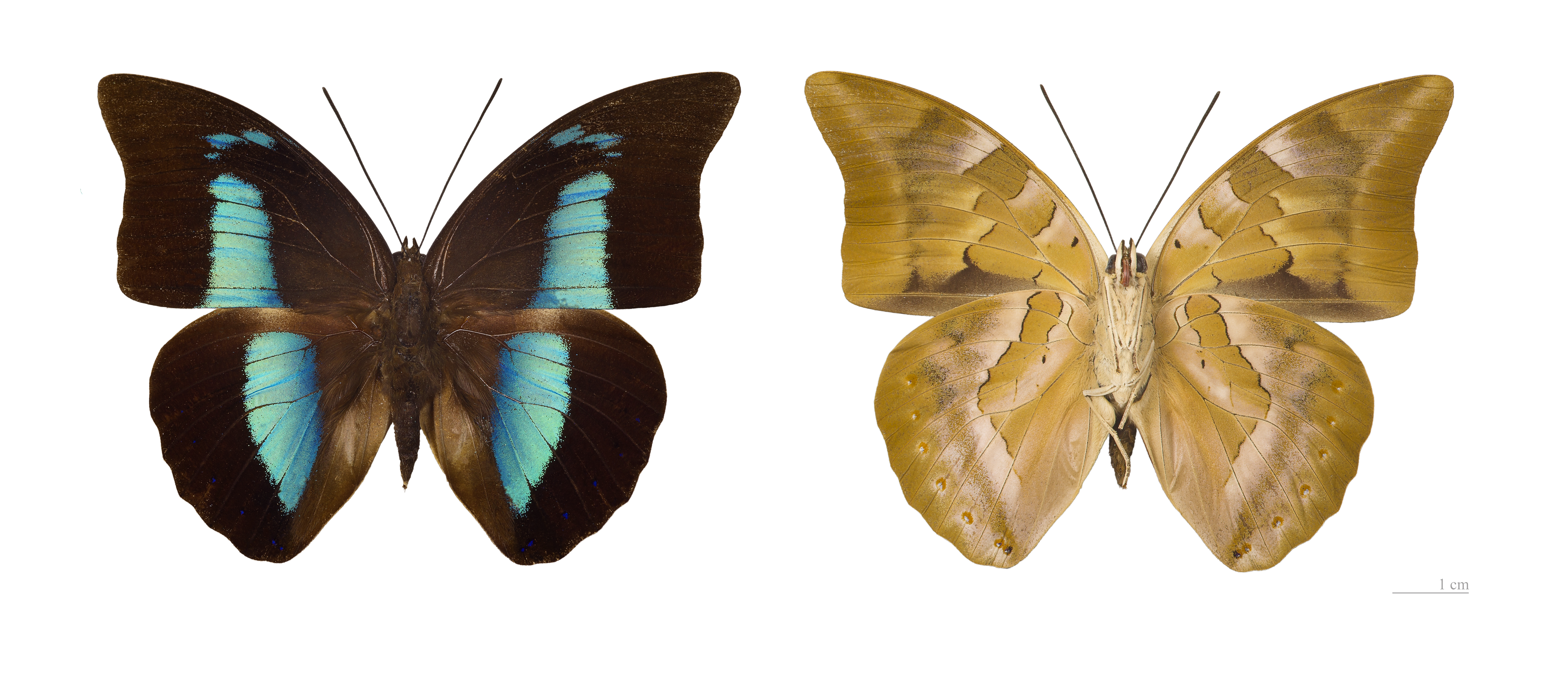
Archaeoprepona demophon - both sides

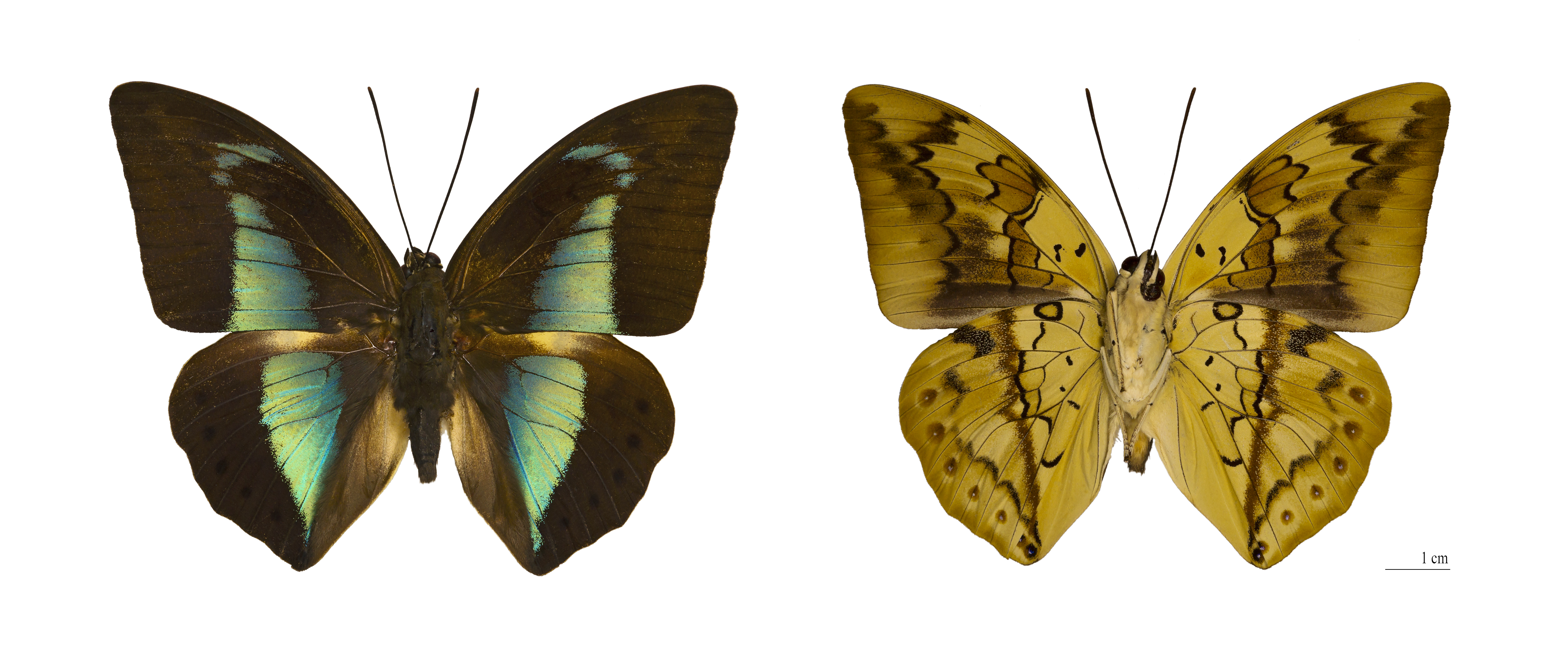
Archaeoprepona licomedes - both sides

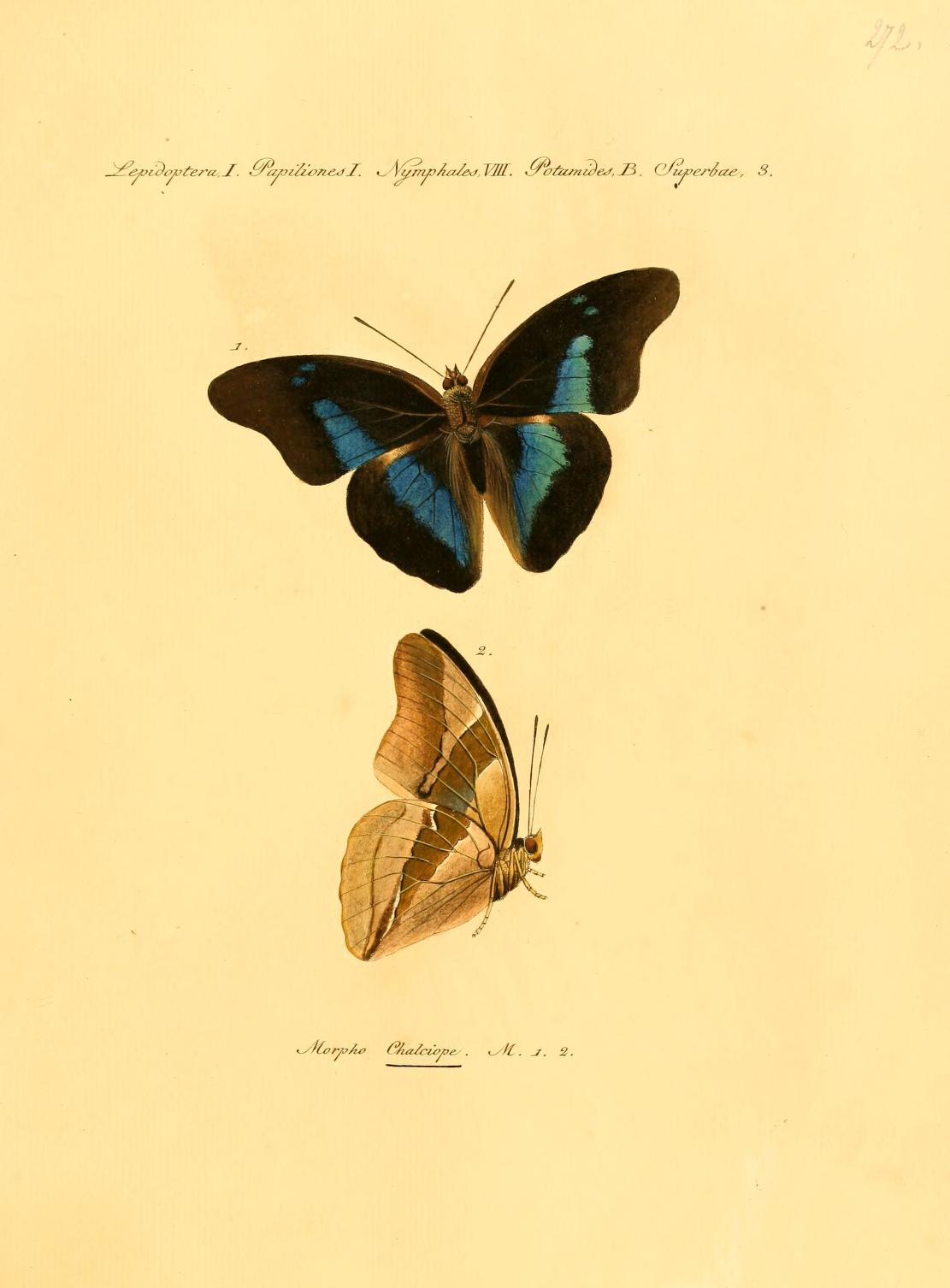
Archaeoprepona chalciope – Hübner's 1821 illustration

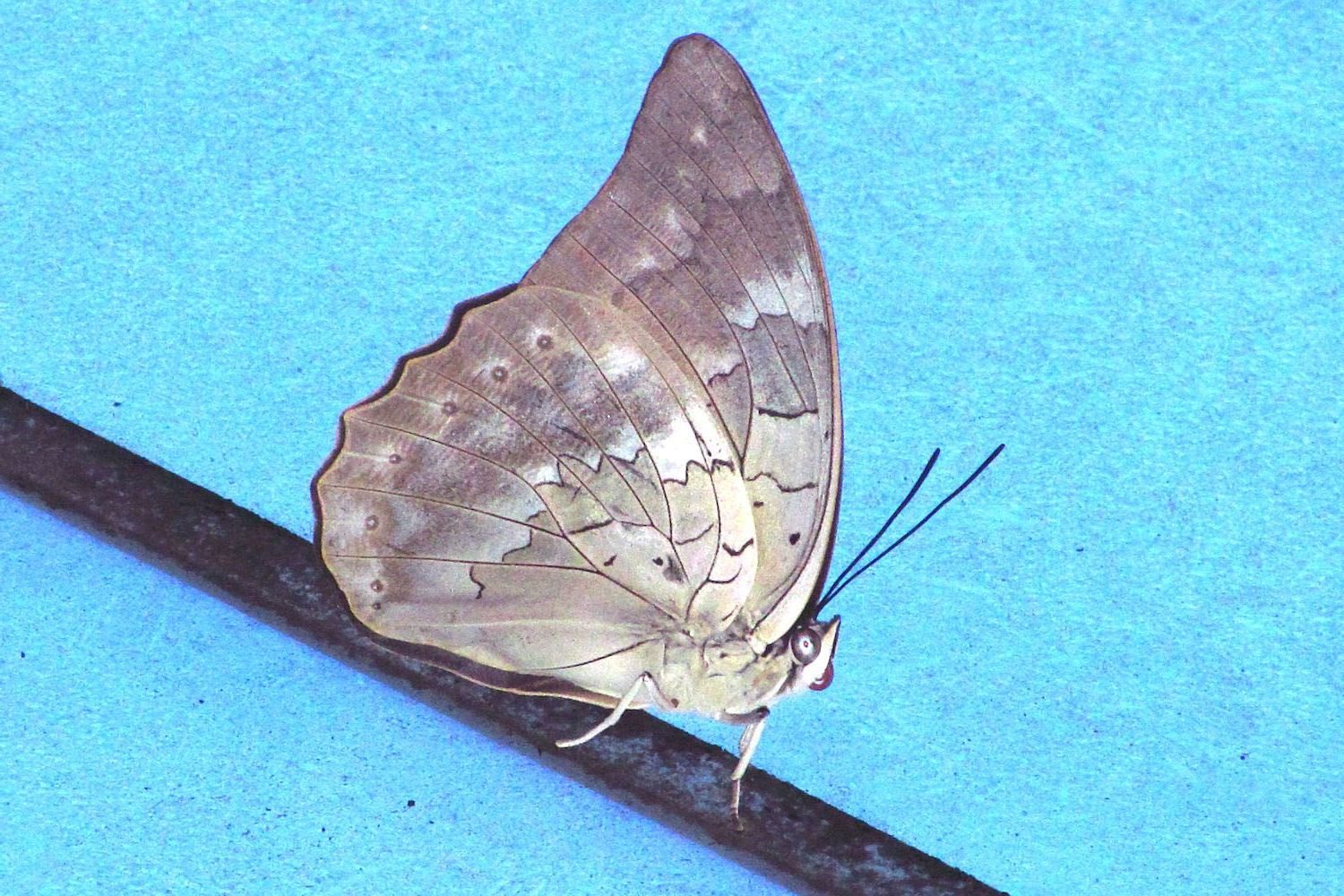
Archaeoprepona demophoon andicola
