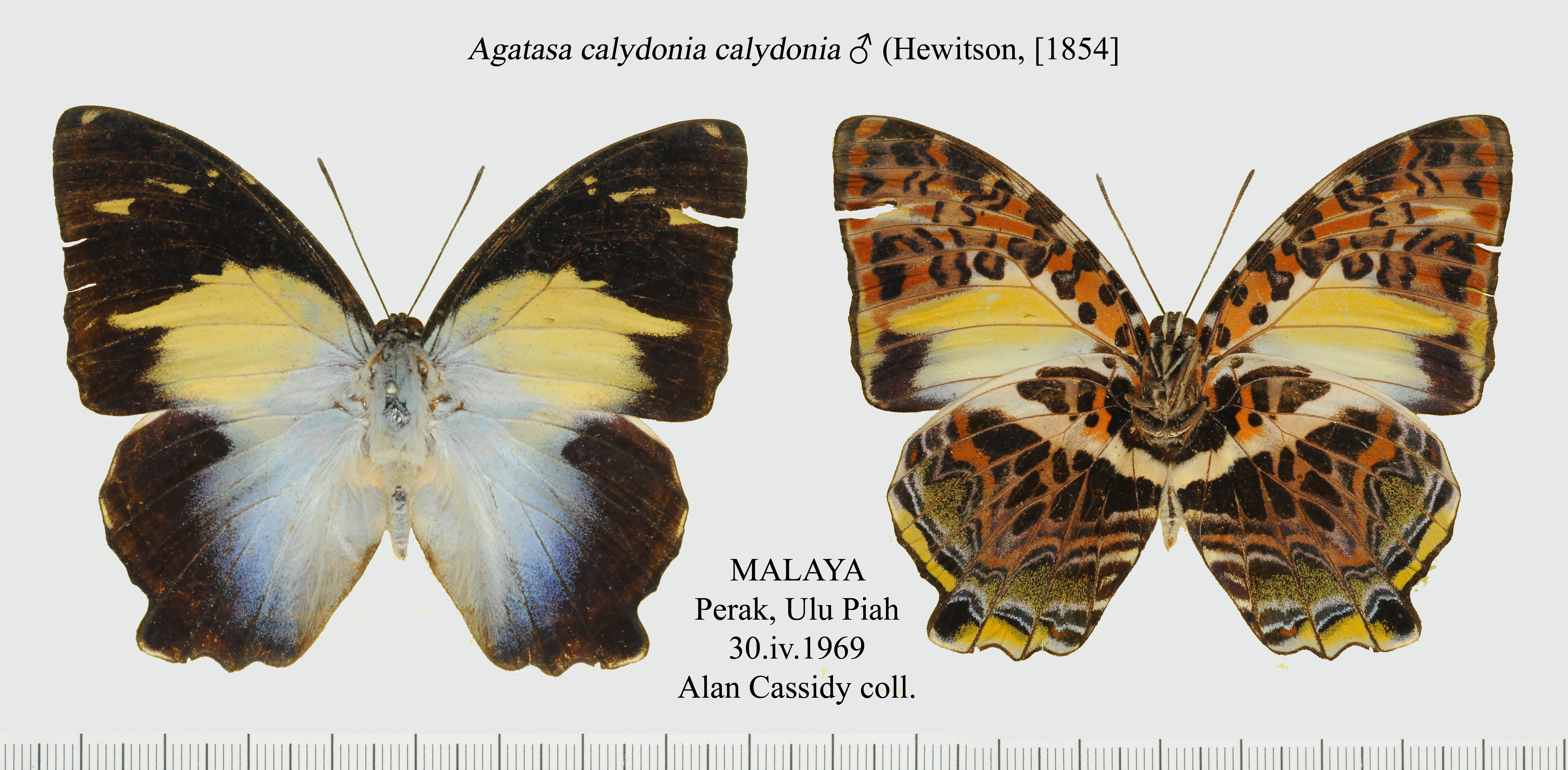
- Agatasa calydonia calydonia

Scientific classification
- Kingdom: Animalia
- Phylum: Arthropoda
- Clade: Pancrustacea
- Class: Insecta
- Order: Lepidoptera
- Family: Nymphalidae
- Tribe: Prothoini
- Genus: Agatasa; Moore, [1899]
- Species: A. calydonia

Binomial name
- Agatasa calydonia (Hewitson, 1854)

= Agatasa =

Glorious begum

Monotypic genus of brush-footed butterflies

Agatasa is a butterfly genus in the brush-footed butterflies family (Nymphalidae). It is monotypic, containing only Agatasa calydonia, the glorious begum, which is found from southern Burma, through the Thai-Malay Peninsula, to Borneo, Sumatra and the Philippines.
