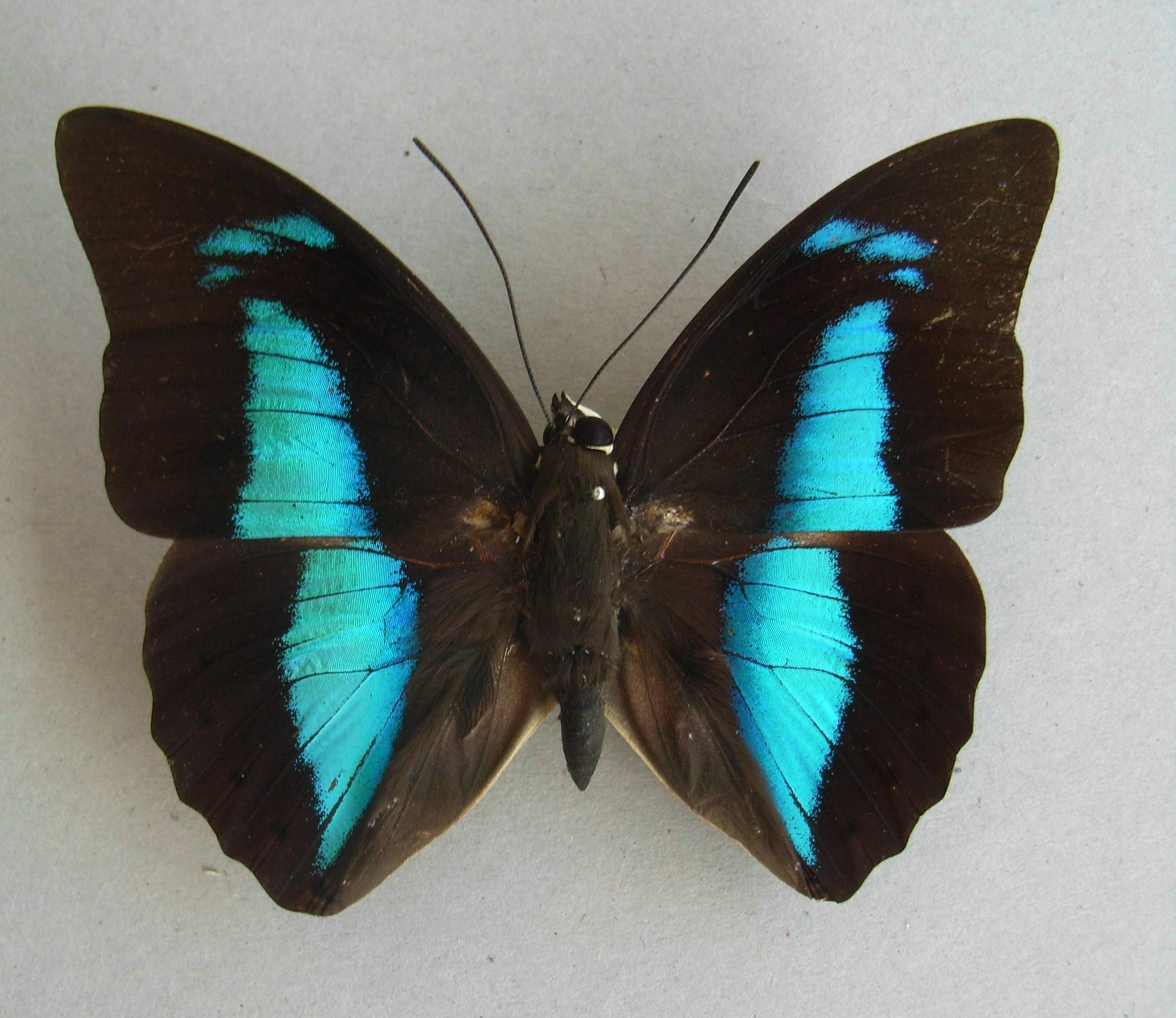

Scientific classification
- Domain: Eukaryota
- Kingdom: Animalia
- Phylum: Arthropoda
- Class: Insecta
- Order: Lepidoptera
- Family: Nymphalidae
- Genus: Archaeoprepona
- Species: A. meander

Binomial name
- Archaeoprepona meander (Cramer, [1775])

Synonyms
- Papilio meander Cramer, [1775]; Prepona meander

= Archaeoprepona meander =

Meander prepona

Species of butterfly

Archaeoprepona meander, the Meander prepona, is a butterfly in the family Nymphalidae. It is found from Mexico to the Amazon basin.

== Subspecies ==
- Archaeoprepona meander meander (Suriname)
- Archaeoprepona meander megabates (Peru, Bolivia, Panama, Colombia) three-toned prepona
- Archaeoprepona meander phoebus (Honduras, Mexico)
- Archaeoprepona meander castorina (Brazil)
