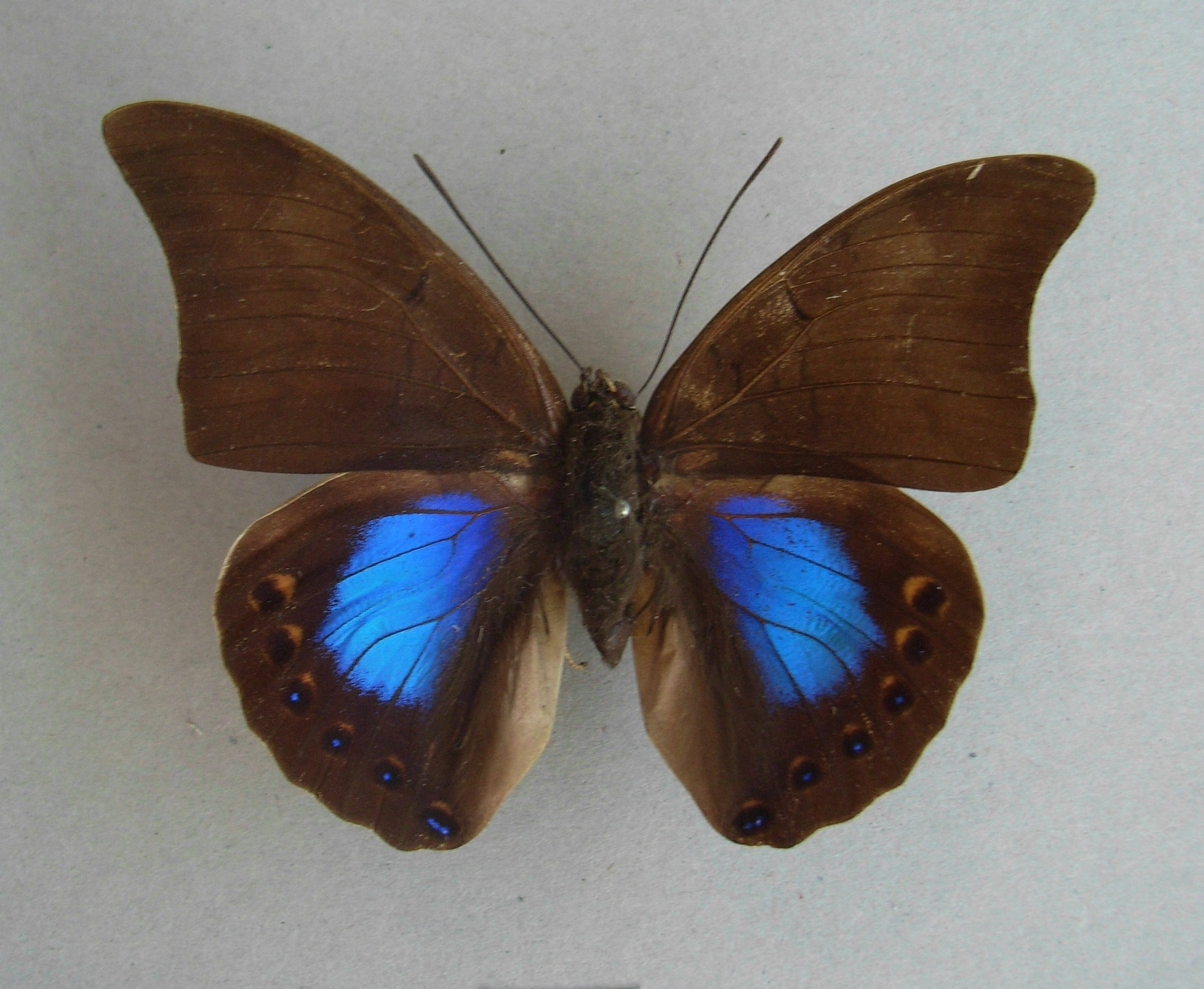

Scientific classification
- Kingdom: Animalia
- Phylum: Arthropoda
- Class: Insecta
- Order: Lepidoptera
- Family: Nymphalidae
- Tribe: Preponini
- Genus: Archaeoprepona
- Species: A. chromus

Binomial name
- Archaeoprepona chromus (Guérin-Ménéville, 1844)

Synonyms
- List: Noreppa chromus (Guérin-Ménéville, 1844); Nymphalis (Prepona) chromus Guérin-Méneville, [1844]; Prepona hercules Doubleday, 1848 (nom. nud.); Prepona hercules Doubleday, [1849]; Prepona hercules ab. ochracea (Fassl, 1912); Prepona chromus fassli Röber, 1914; Prepona chromus chiliarches Fruhstorfer, 1916; Prepona chromus xenarchus Fruhstorfer, 1916; Prepona chromus obsoleta Orfila, 1950; Prepona chromus f. synchroma Staudinger, 1886

= Archaeoprepona chromus =

Monotypic brush-footed butterfly genus

Archaeoprepona chromus is a species of Neotropical charaxine butterflies in the family Nymphalidae, native to South America. It was observed to have an unusual for Nymphalidae behavior, in which it responds to an approaching predator with sagittal movements of its hindwings.

== Taxonomy ==
The following subspecies are recognised:

- Archaeoprepona chromus chromus (Guérin-Ménéville, 1844) (Colombia, Bolivia, Venezuela, Peru, Argentina)
- Archaeoprepona chromus priene (Hewitson, 1869) (Colombia)

== Description ==
The wingspan is about 85 mm.

== Distribution and habitat ==
Montane forest at 1500 to 2000 metres in the Neotropical realm.

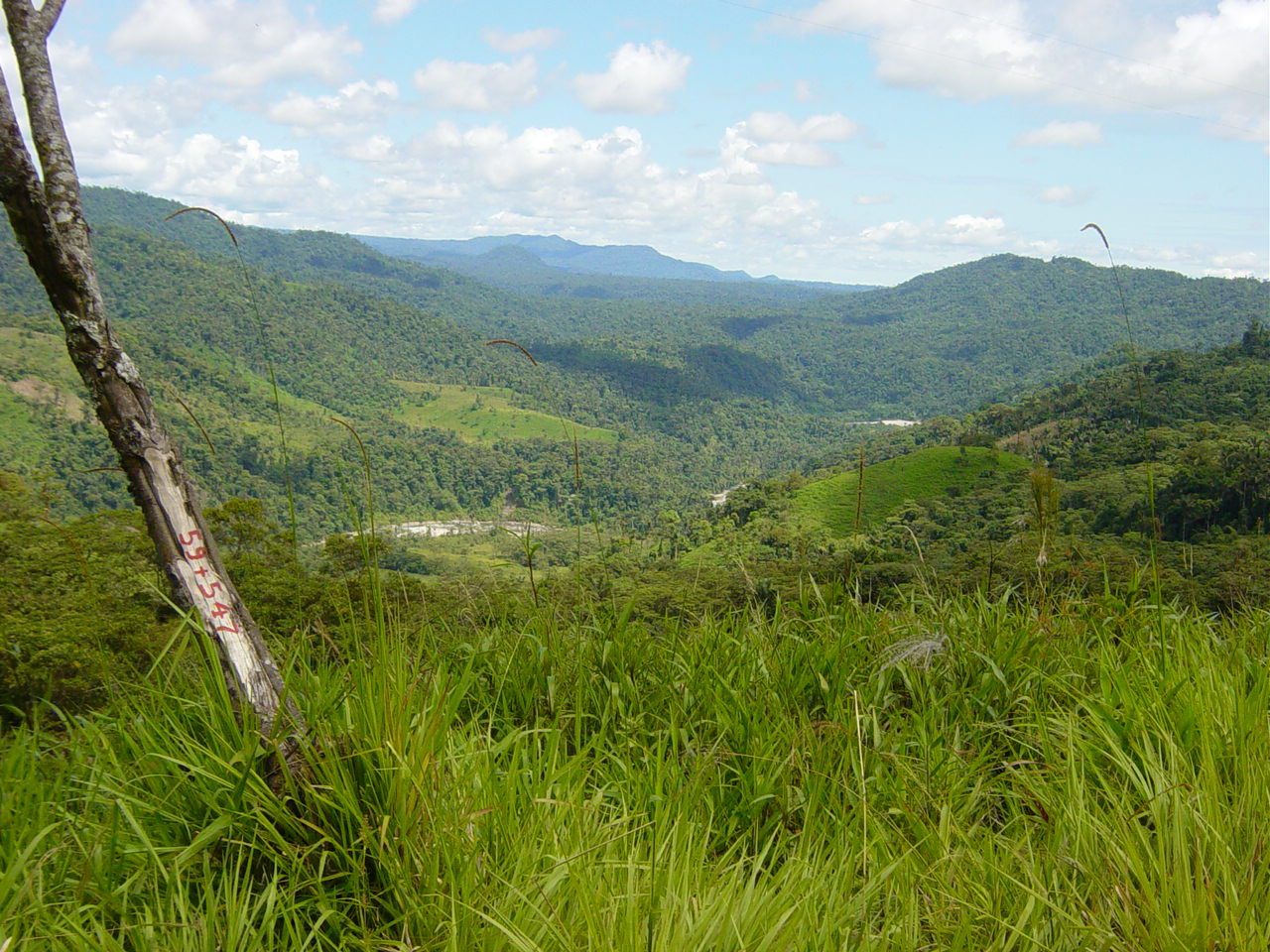
Sangay National Park, Ecuador
