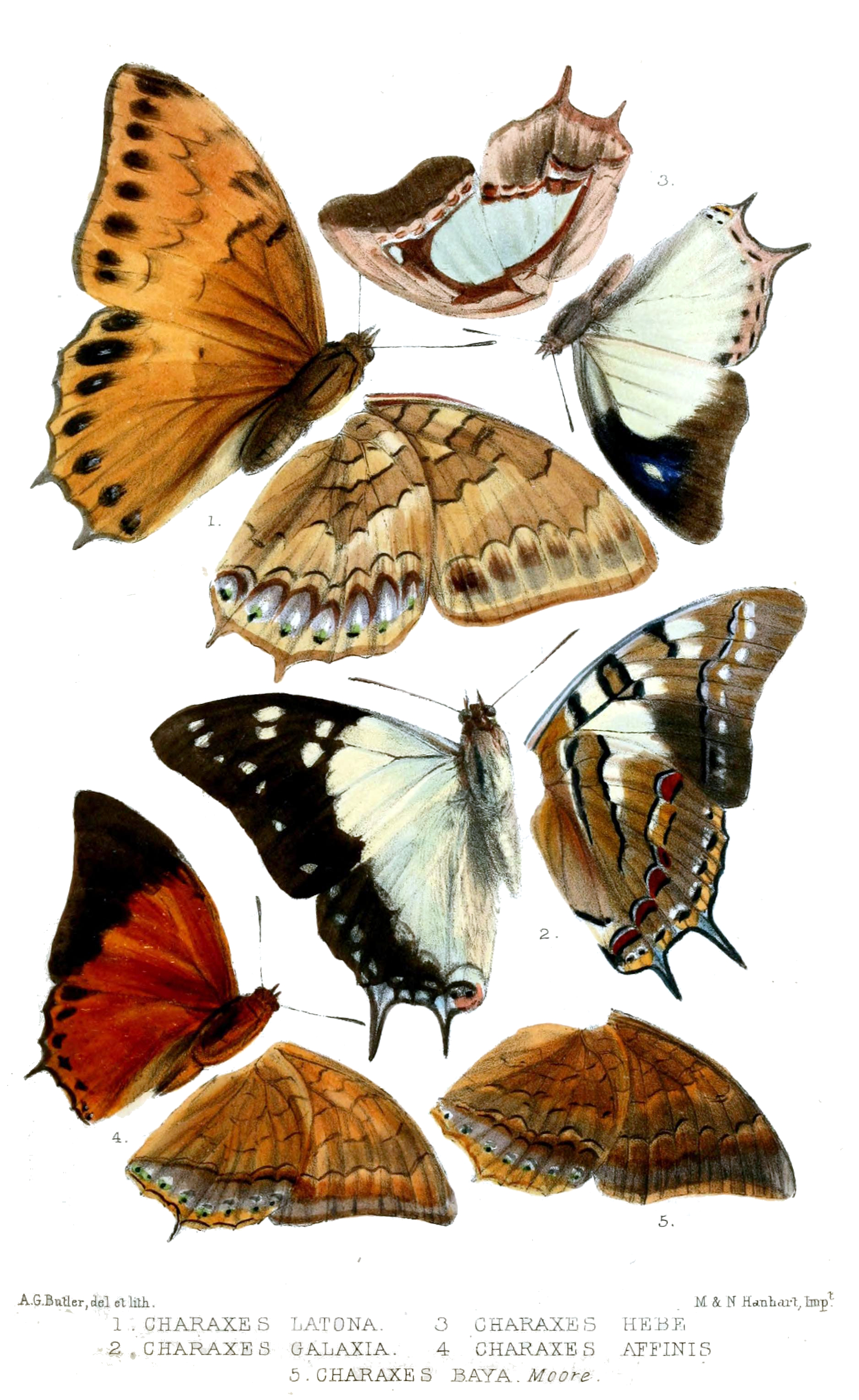

Scientific classification
- Domain: Eukaryota
- Kingdom: Animalia
- Phylum: Arthropoda
- Class: Insecta
- Order: Lepidoptera
- Family: Nymphalidae
- Subfamily: Charaxinae; Doherty, 1886

Tribes
- Anaeini; Charaxini; Euxanthini; Pallini; Prothoini; Preponini

= Charaxinae =

Subfamily of butterfly family Nymphalidae

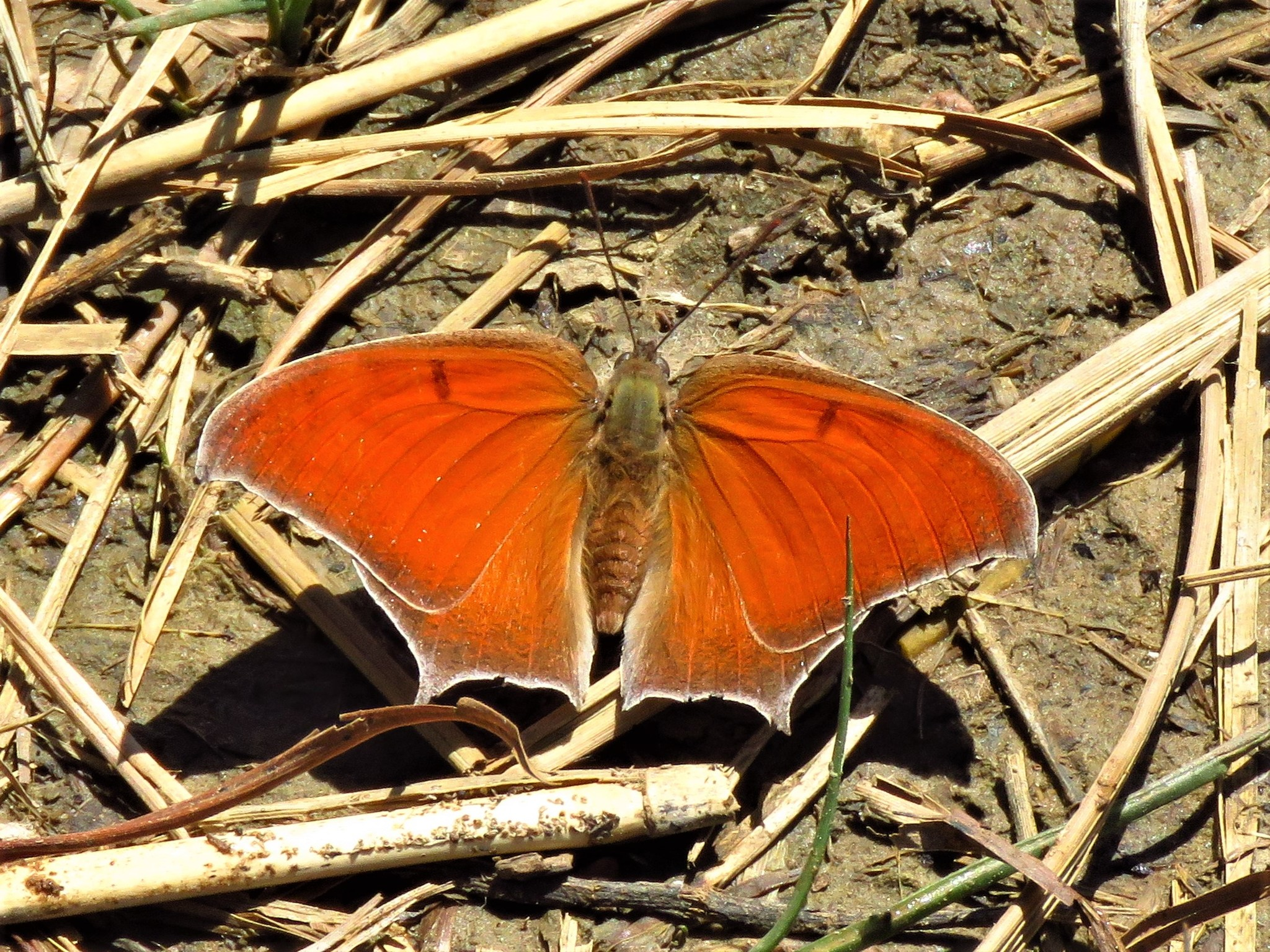
Anaea andria

The Charaxinae, the leafwings, are a nymphalid subfamily of butterflies that includes about 400 species, inhabiting mainly the tropics, although some species extend into temperate regions in North America, Europe, China, and southern Australia. Significant variations exist between the species. For example, some are medium sized and bright orange above, but mottled gray or brown below. This underwing coloration helps them resemble a dead leaf when they are at rest, as they keep their wings closed. With relatively few exceptions, the hindwings of the members of this subfamily have jagged edges.

Adults are very robust and fast flyers, and many are strongly attracted to drink liquids from carrion, dung, and rotten fruits, rather than nectar from flowers.

Males establish territories and perch on tree trunks, branches, and even the ground. The eggs are smooth and round and generally with a somewhat concave apex.

Some genera in this subfamily (notably Charaxes, Agrias, and Prepona) are very popular among butterfly collectors.

== Genera ==
Tribe Charaxini Guenée, 1865

- Polyura – nawabs
- Charaxes – rajahs and pashas, emperors

Tribe Euxanthini Rydon, 1971

- Euxanthe

Tribe Pallini Rydon, 1971

- Palla

Tribe Prothoini Roepke, 1938

- Prothoe
- Agatasa – glorious begum

Tribe Preponini Rydon, 1971

- Agrias
- Prepona
- Archaeoprepona
- Anaeomorpha (sometimes in Anaeini)

Tribe Anaeini (also see tribe article)

- Anaea
- Coenophlebia
- Consul
- Fountainea
- Hypna
- Memphis (formerly included in Anaea)
- Polygrapha
- Siderone
- Zaretis

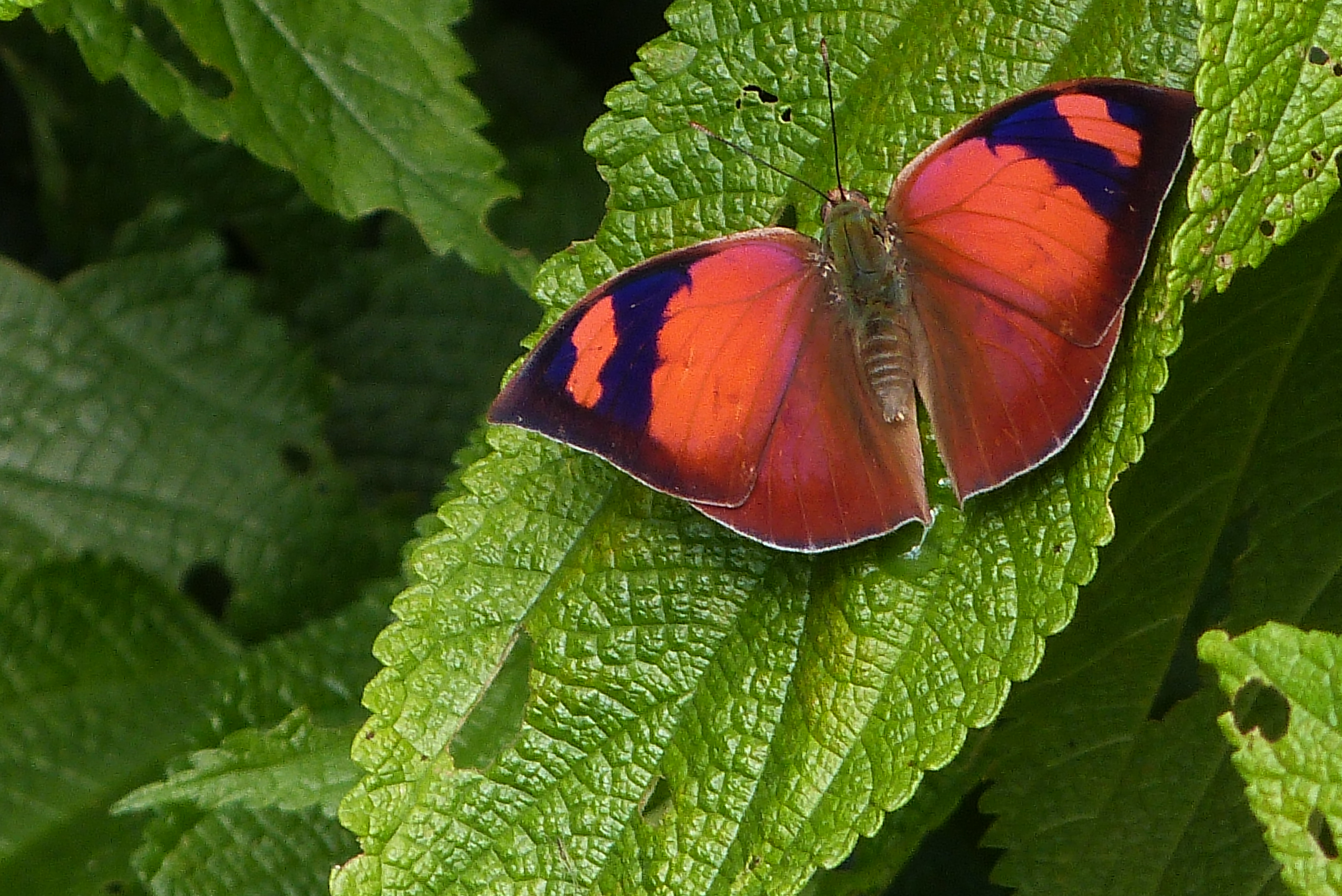
Fountainea ryphea
