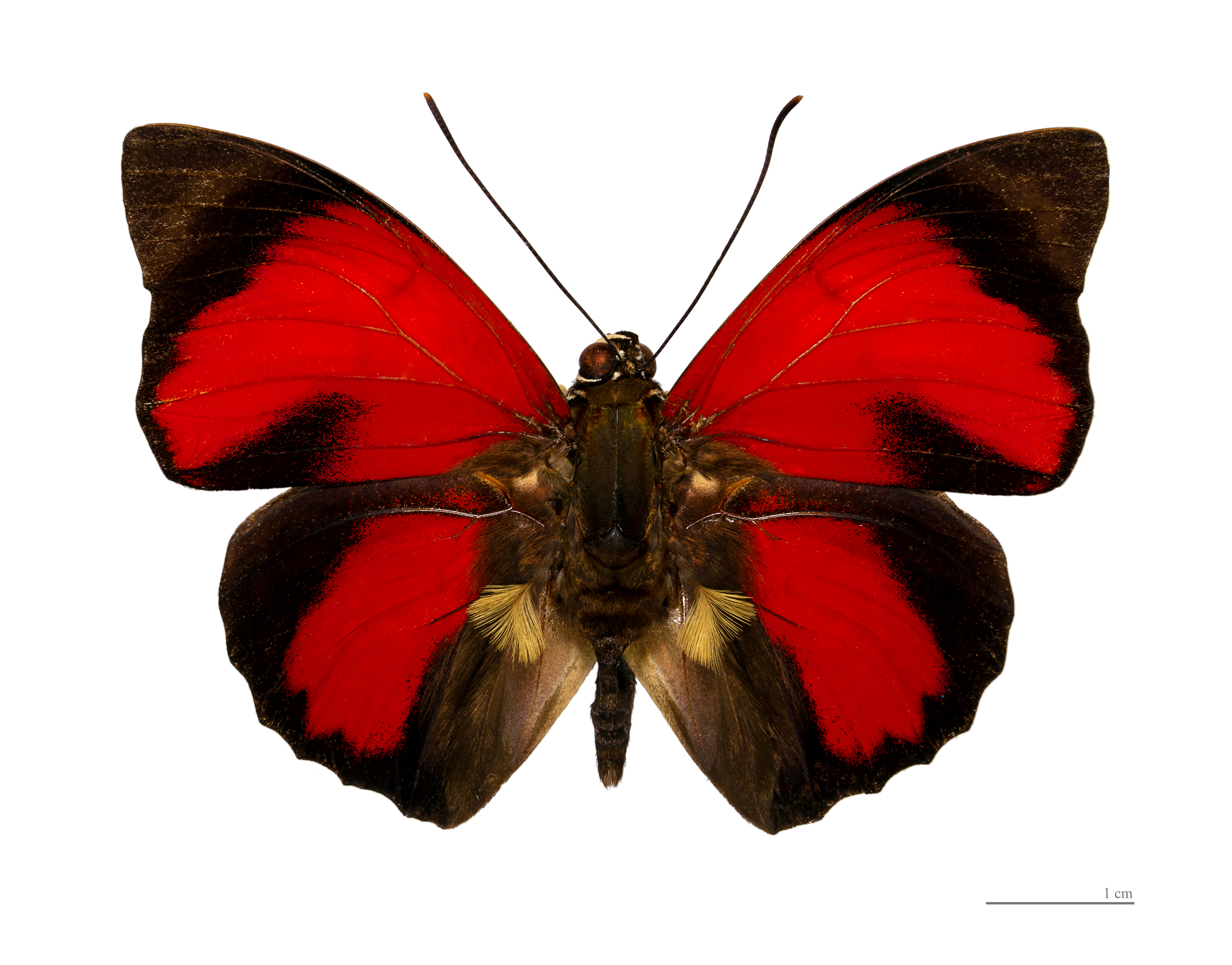
- A. c. gringA - dorsal view
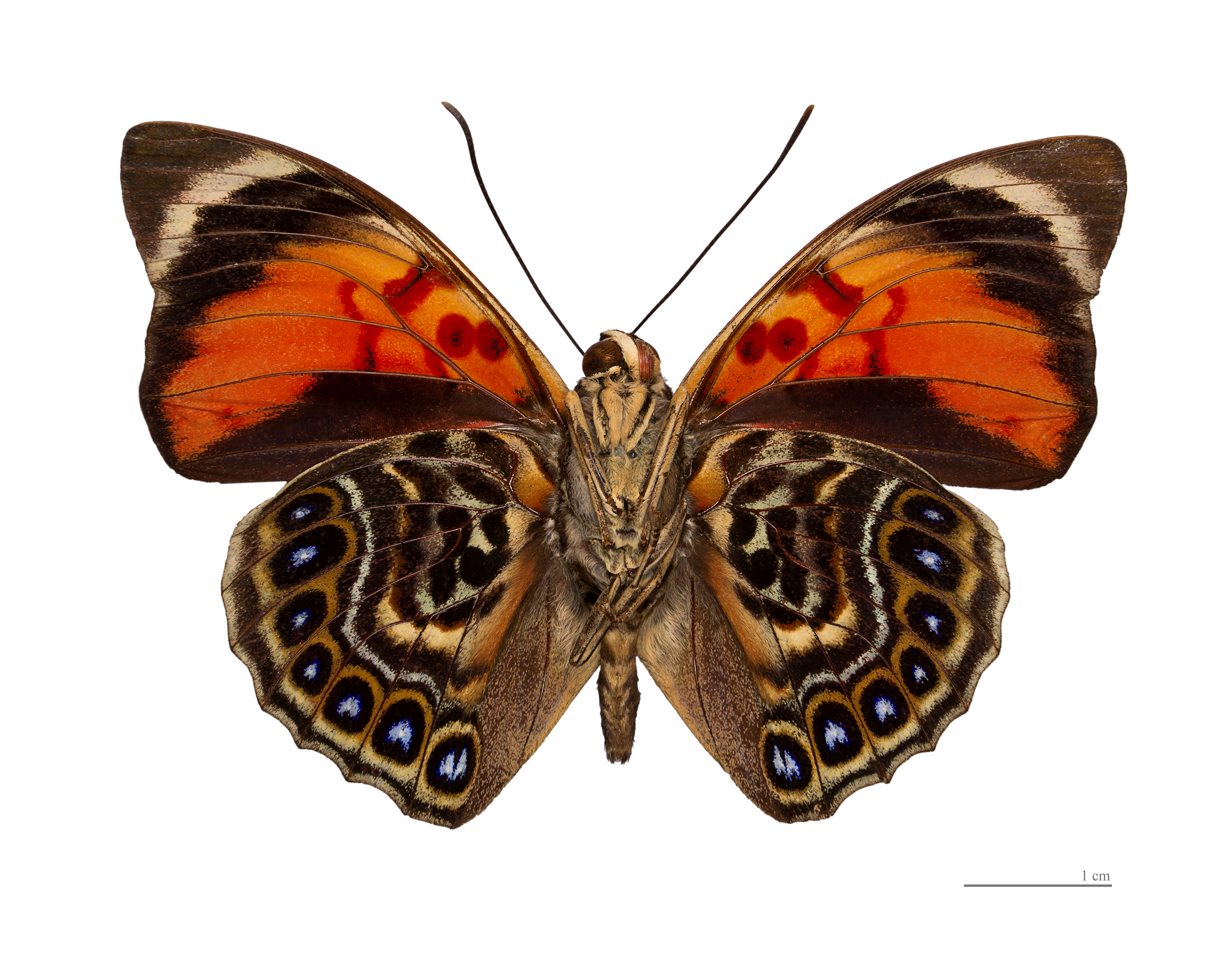
- A. c. claudina - ventral view

Scientific classification
- Domain: Eukaryota
- Kingdom: Animalia
- Phylum: Arthropoda
- Class: Insecta
- Order: Lepidoptera
- Family: Nymphalidae
- Genus: Agrias
- Species: A. claudina

Binomial name
- Agrias claudina (Godart, [1824])

Synonyms
- Nymphalis claudina Godart, [1824]; Papilio claudia Schulze, 1776; Agrias sahlkei Honrath, [1885]; Agrias claudianus Staudinger, [1885]

= Agrias claudina =

Species of butterfly

Agrias claudina, the Claudina Agrias, is a butterfly of the family Nymphalidae. It is found from Venezuela and Guyana to Bolivia. The subspecies A. c. sardanapalus is found in Ecuador, Brazil and Peru. It is found in primary and secondary rainforest at altitudes between 200 and 600 meters.

The larvae feed on Erythroxylum species. Adults feed on decomposing fruit and rotting fish. The Agrias Claudina physically are very beautiful looking, not only this but are pretty large for butterflies. Agria Claudina has wing spans of 2.8-4.7in. Between females and males, there are very small differences in their color, shape, size, and structure. Males have yellow tufts that are used to attract female butterflies. In all Agria Claudia, the bottom of their wings has different patterns, the main colors seen on these butterflies are blue, red, black, and yellow.

== Gallery ==
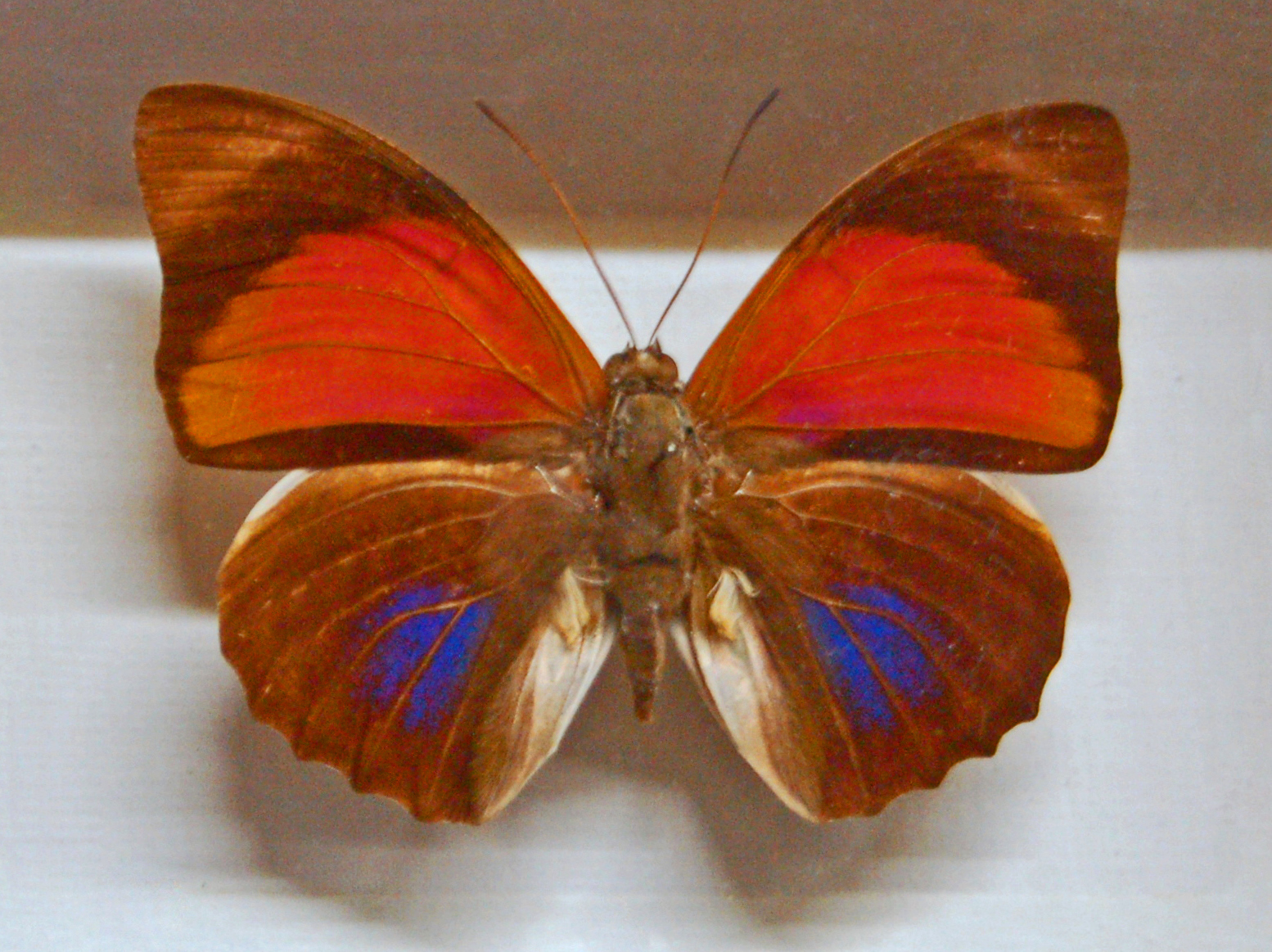
A. c. sardanapalus

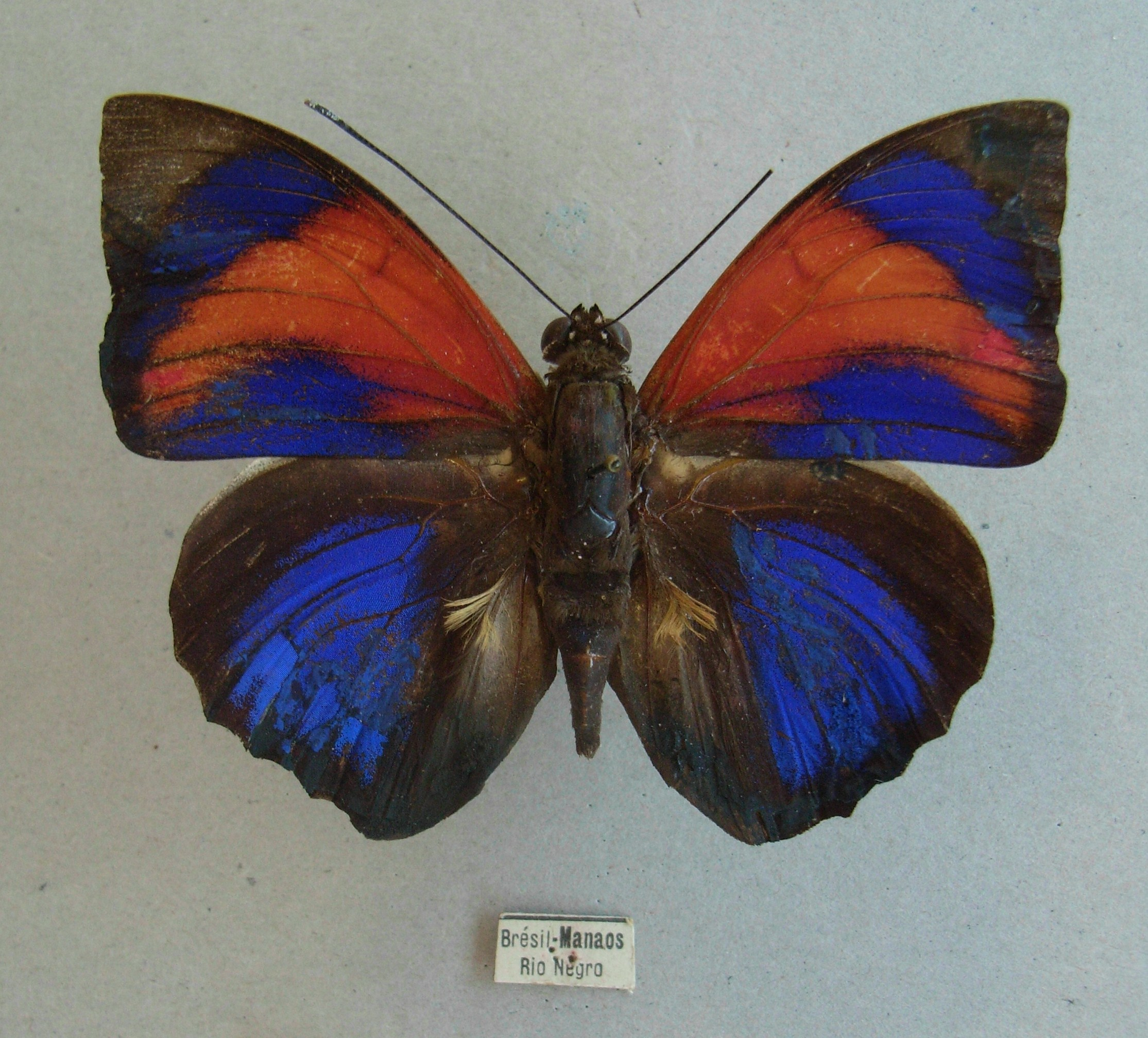
A. c. lecerfi

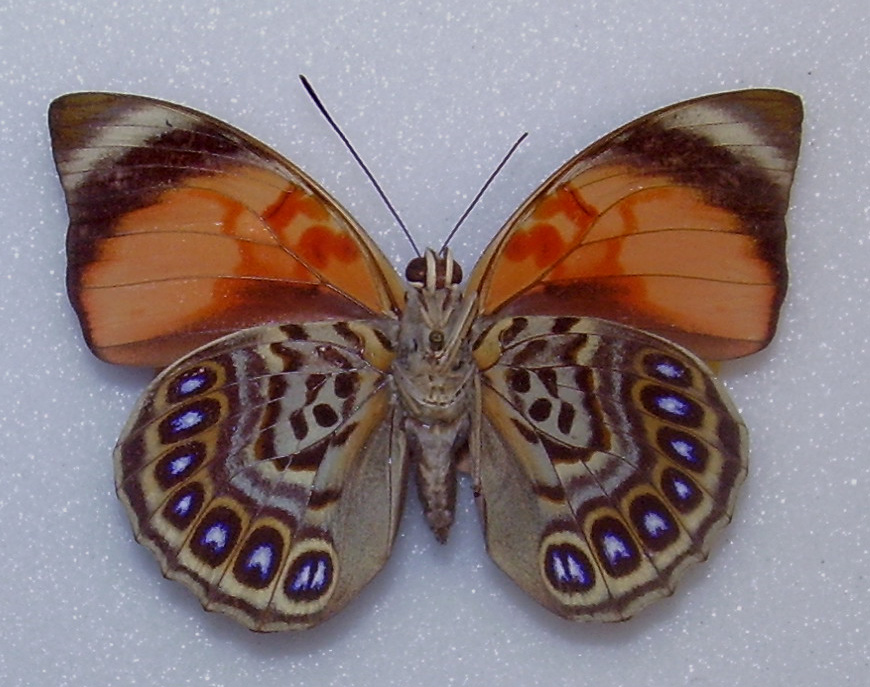
A. c. satanas

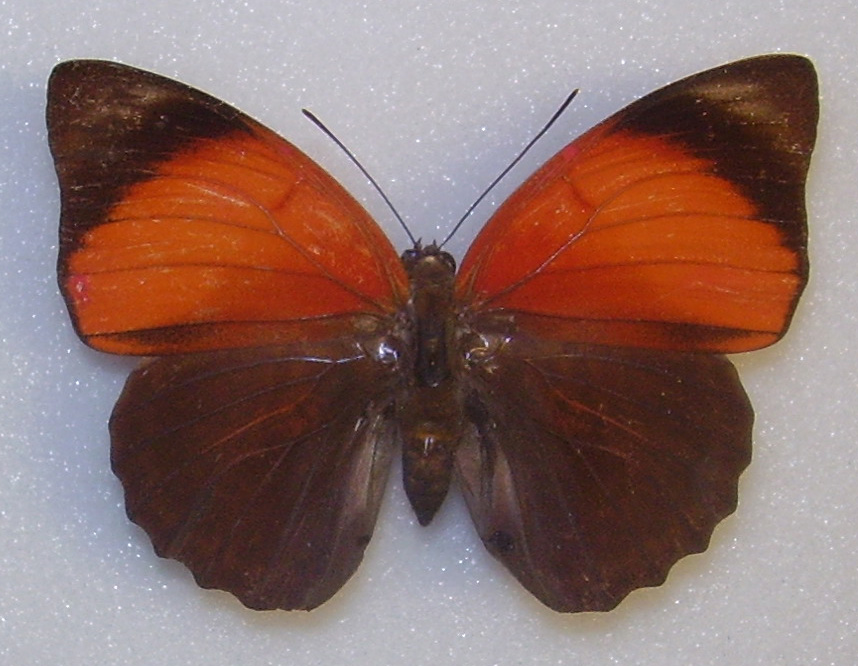
A. c. wachenheim

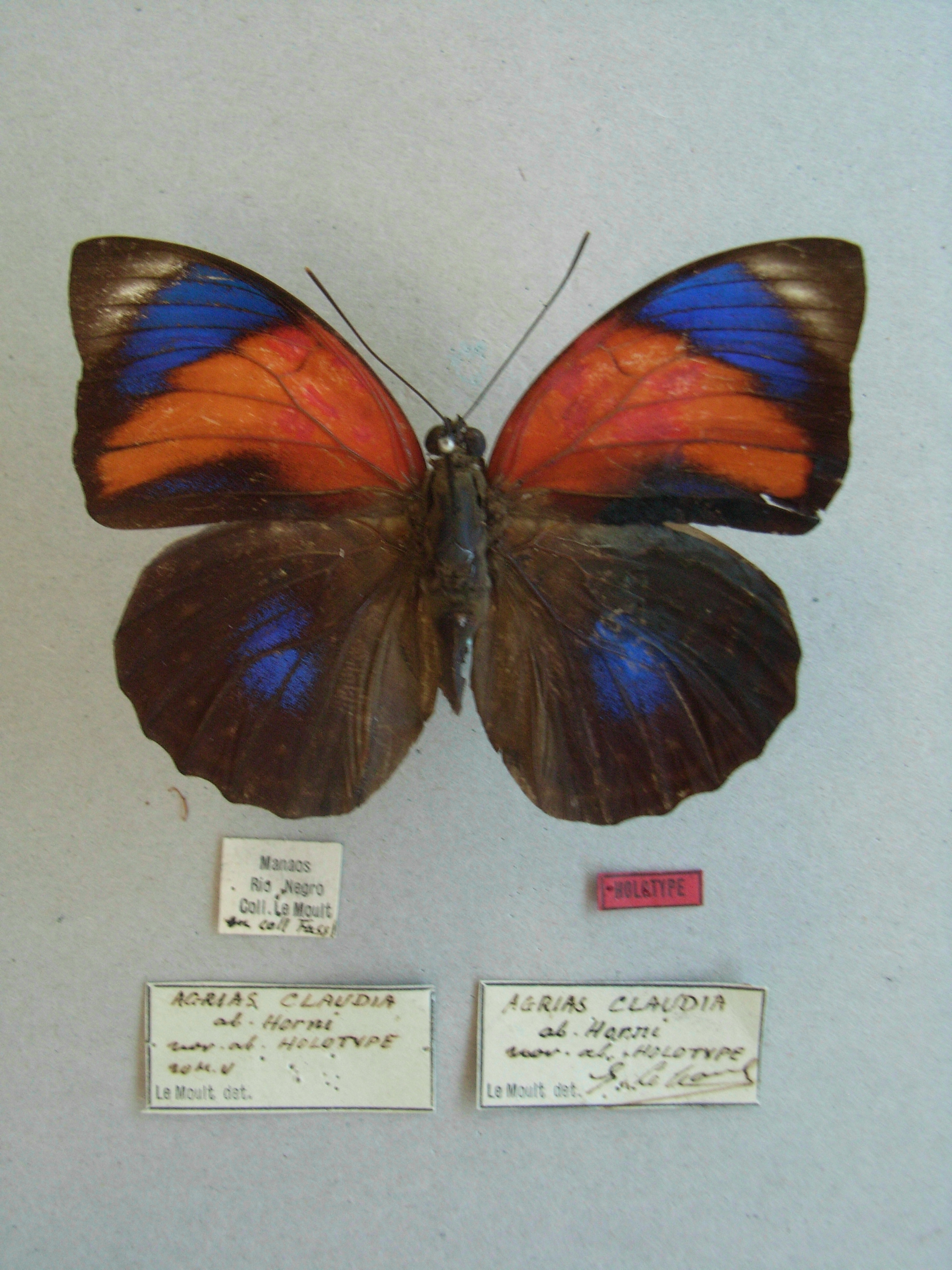
A. c. horni

== Historical accounts ==
Henry Walter Bates wrote about A. c. sardanapalus: "This magnificent butterfly is one of the most variegated of the whole entomological world. I found it at different places of the Upper Amazon, but always only in sunny clearings of the primeval forests and in oppressively hot weather between the wet and dry season. It flies similarly as the Prepona and it is, therefore, quite impossible to capture it except when it is sitting. The first, specimens I saw were baited by the sap exuding from a tree where a dense crowd of other beautiful butterflies, such as Prepona, Paphia (Andea), Sideronia, Gynaecia and others were daily assembled. But the continual coming and going of the greedy animals made the wonderful Agrias extremely timid and wary, so that I could not grasp it. When being met alone in the roads sitting on defilements, it was much easier to capture, but only 3 or so times during the long years I succeeded in meeting it in such a position."

Paul Hahnel wrote: "By far more precious than the Panacea flying in open spaces, appealed to us some few specimens of the large sardanapalus clad in purple and blue, which we captured at the bait in the forest and which is not exceeded in beauty by any other butterfly. For although some Indian Ornithoptera and the Morphids flying on the Amazon surpass it in the development of single attributes, such as size and splendour of colours, they do not come up to its abundant and most thoroughly accomplished markings of the under surface expressing the Nymphalid-type the most perfectly in sardanapalus. But above all other excellencies it was adorned by the noble descent, belonging to a genus being in every way unblemished by vulgarity, the species of which are rarities to such an extent that none of the existing large collections is able to boast of possessing all of them in completion."
