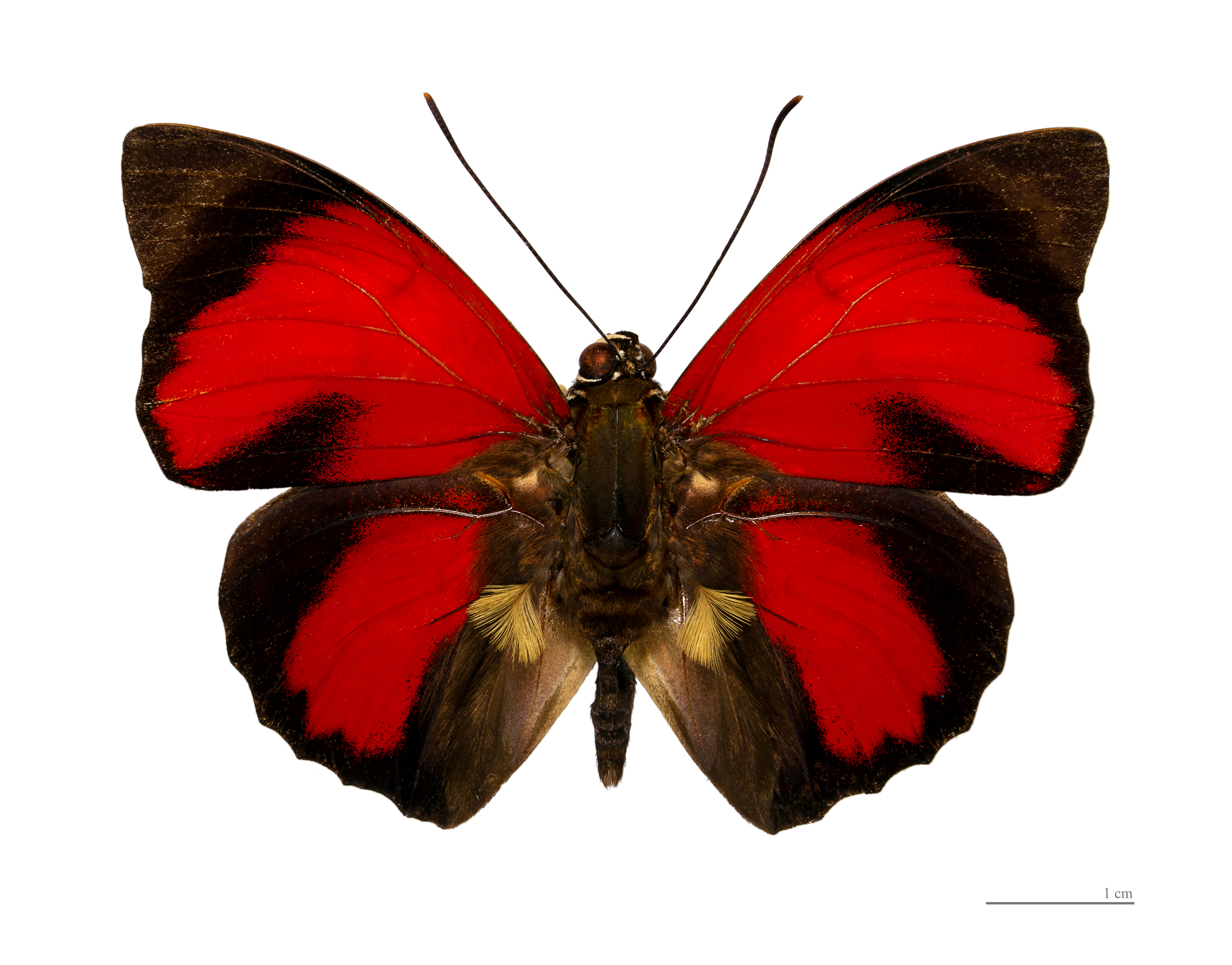
- Agrias claudina - MHNT

Scientific classification
- Kingdom: Animalia
- Phylum: Arthropoda
- Clade: Pancrustacea
- Class: Insecta
- Order: Lepidoptera
- Family: Nymphalidae
- Tribe: Preponini
- Genus: Agrias; Doubleday, 1845

Species
- Five or more, see text

= Agrias =

Genus of brush-footed butterflies

Agrias is a genus of Neotropical charaxine nymphalid butterflies found in South and Central America.

The German lepidopterist Hans Fruhstorfer wrote: "In this magnificent tropical genus, upon which nature seems to have showered all her abundance of most brilliant colours, and which is, therefore, justly called the 'princely race' of the Nymphalidae, we are most surprised to meet a repetition of two genera of not less abundant colours: the Callithea and Catagramma, except that the Agrias species greatly excel the latter in size and magnificent colours, and only the males of this genus bear a sexual distinction in the shape of a hair-brush on the hindwings. Some of them, like the famous A. sardanapalus, having been first discovered by Bates in the Amazon Valley, are of an absolutely charming beauty, and the contrast of its purple-red forewings beaming through a blue lustre hued over them as if in a violet purple gloss, with the brilliantly sapphire-blue hindwings, is undoubtedly one of the most magnificent sights that nature has ever produced in the whole world of butterflies."

Prized by collectors, these large, showy butterflies have had hundreds of names applied to polymorphic variants.

== Description ==
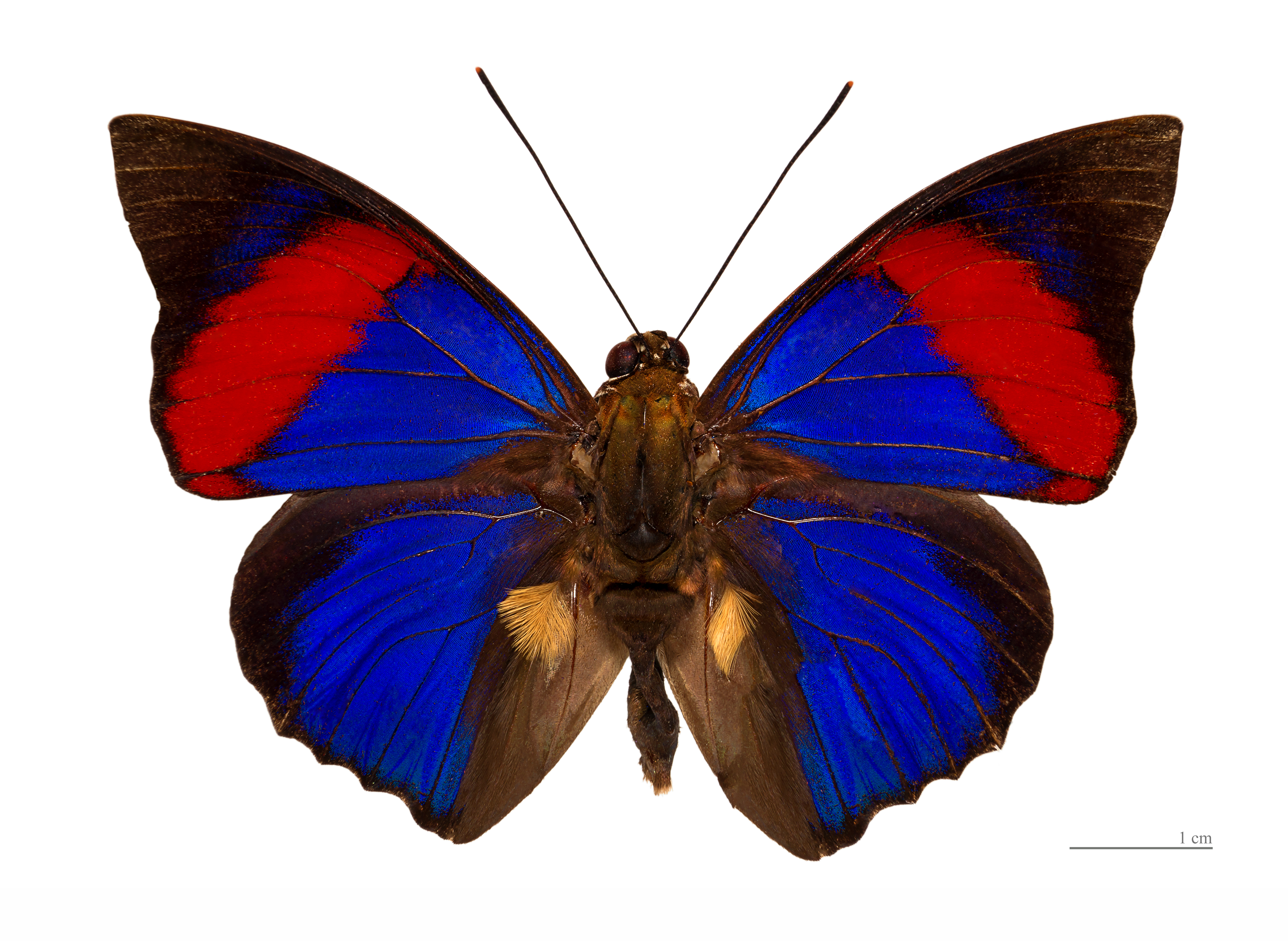

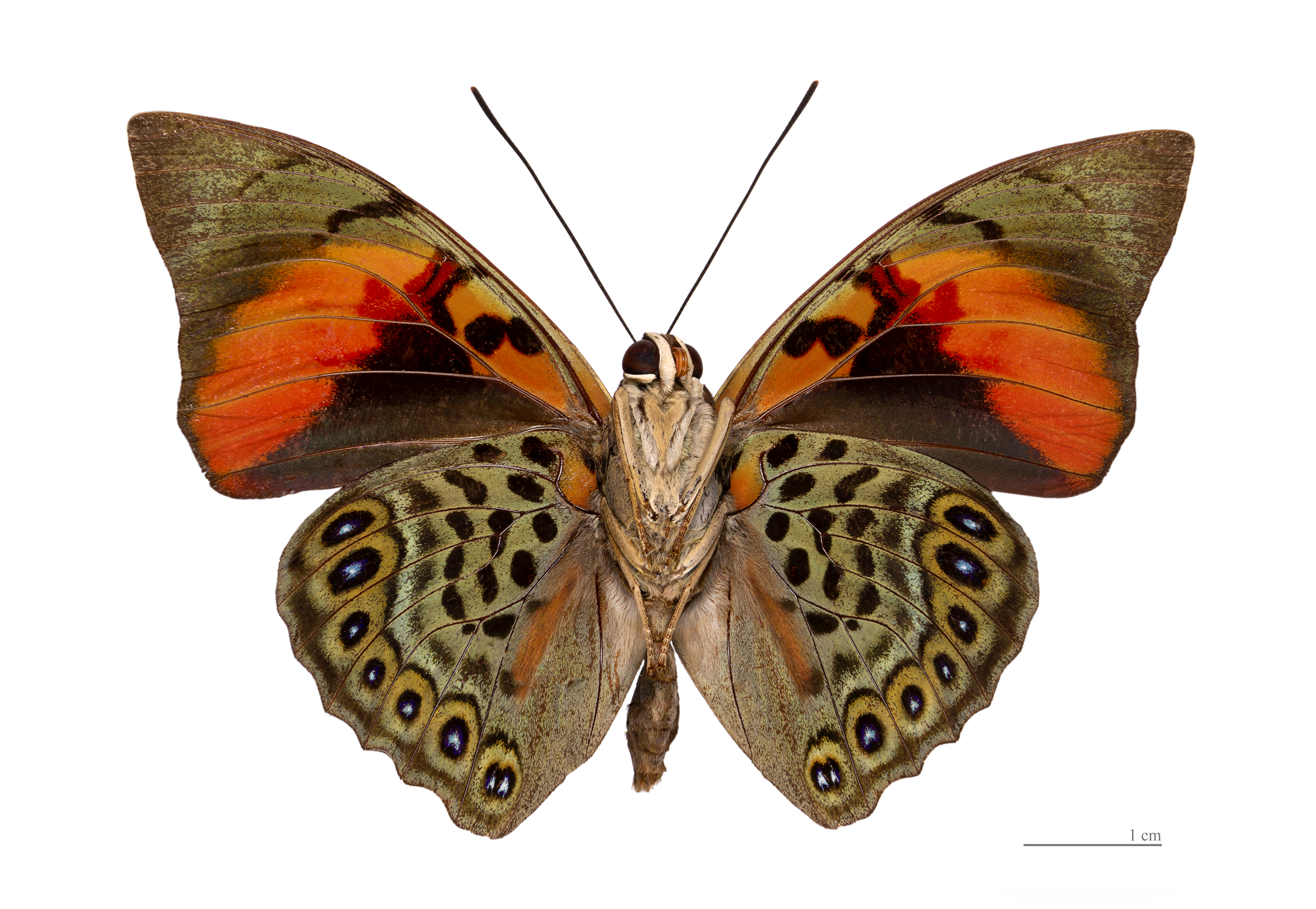

The species of the genus Agrias have, variously, very bright red, orange, iridescent blue and yellow colouration contrasting on the black or bluish background of their upperside wing. The underside wings are patterned. They have a robust appearance (broad thorax and short wide abdomen) allowing fast flight. The wingspan is 70–120 mm. Males of all Agrias species have prominent yellow tufts of androconia scales on the hindwings. These disperse pheromones for attracting suitable mates.

== Biology ==
Adult Agrias live in the forest canopy, occasionally visiting the forest floor to feed on decomposing fruit. The butterflies always feed and rest with their wings closed, but if disturbed they may give a rapid flick of the wings, displaying the vivid colours of the upperside. Males establish territories and perch on tree trunks, branches, and even the ground.

Agrias larvae feed on Erythroxylum. The smooth and round eggs are laid singly on the leaves of the food plant. The larvae are pale brownish, marked with lichen-green spots, have recurved "horns" on the head capsule and a bifid tail. They feed at night and spend the day on twigs. The pupa is pale green. It has a dorsal hump, and tapers sharply toward a stout cremaster and the bifid head. It is suspended from a stem or leaf of the food plant.

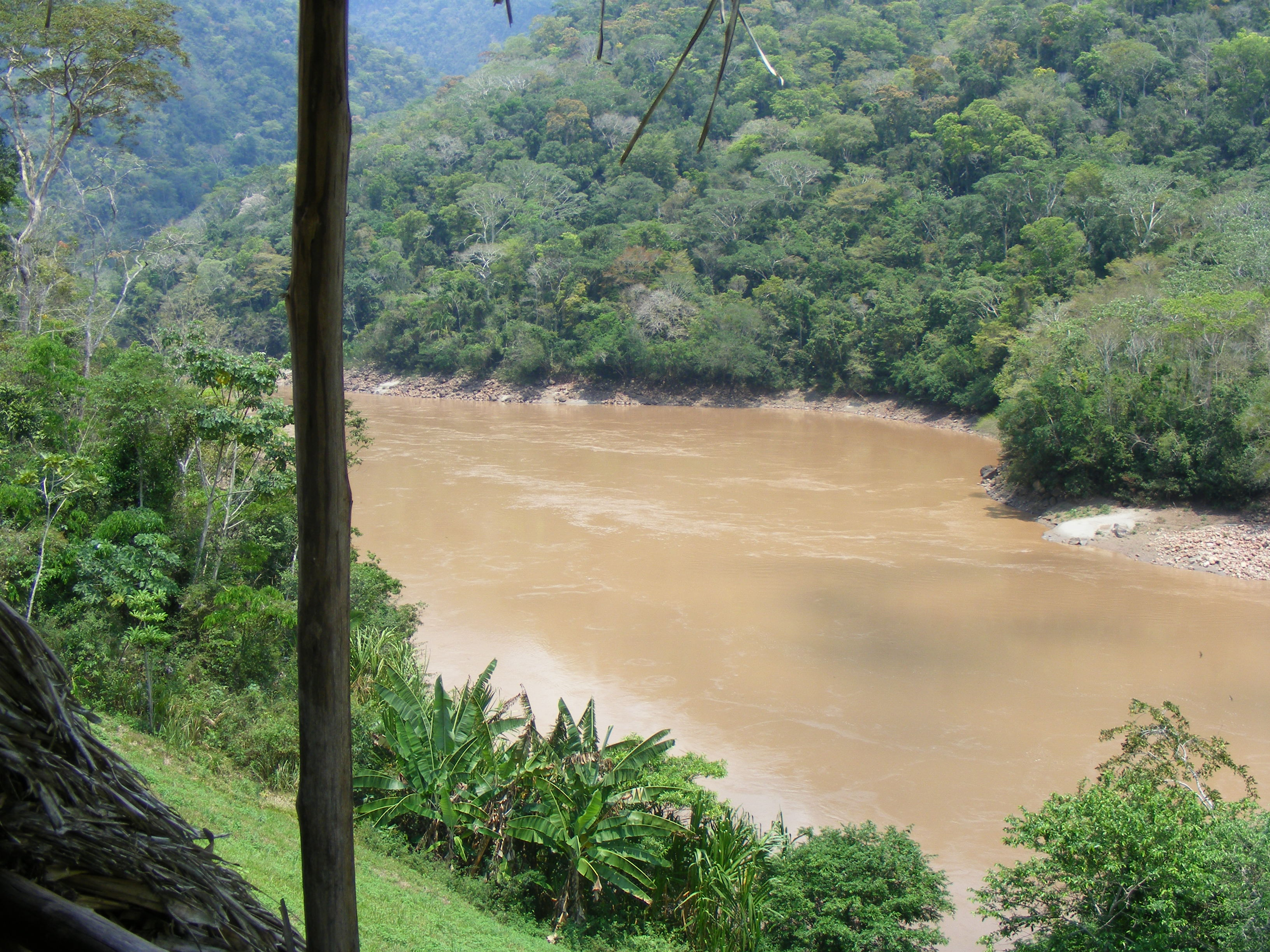
Lowland forest Rio Huallaga, Peru

== Habitat ==
Agrias are found in both lowland and montane tropical wet forests. Adults of Agrias amydon are also found in pasture habitats in the wet season but probably pass most, or all, of the long dry season in forest refugia. During the dry season, strong-flying A. amydon undoubtedly forage in open areas, only to return to sheltered retreats in response to thermal stress.

== Mimicry ==
Agrias phalcidon is a Müllerian mimic with the Asterope (formerly Callithea) species complex.

== Systematics ==
- ▼ Preponini
  - Palla, Noreppa, Anaeomorpha (sometimes in Anaeini)
  - - Archaeoprepona
    - - Agrias

Clade showing phylogenetics of Agrias.

== Hybrids ==
- Prepona × sarumani was described by Paul Smart in 1976 is considered to be a hybrid between Prepona praeneste abrupta and Agrias claudina lugens. Intergeneric hybrids are rare and this may indicate Prepona is very closely related to Agrias or that the genera should be combined.

== Species ==
The following species are accepted by the Atlas of Neotropical Lepidoptera.

- Agrias aedon – Aegon agrias
- Agrias amydon – white-spotted agrias
- Agrias claudina (including A. sardanapalus) – Claudina agrias
- Agrias hewitsonius
- Agrias narcissus

Other authors differ, for instance in regarding A. narcissus as a subspecies of A. aedon.

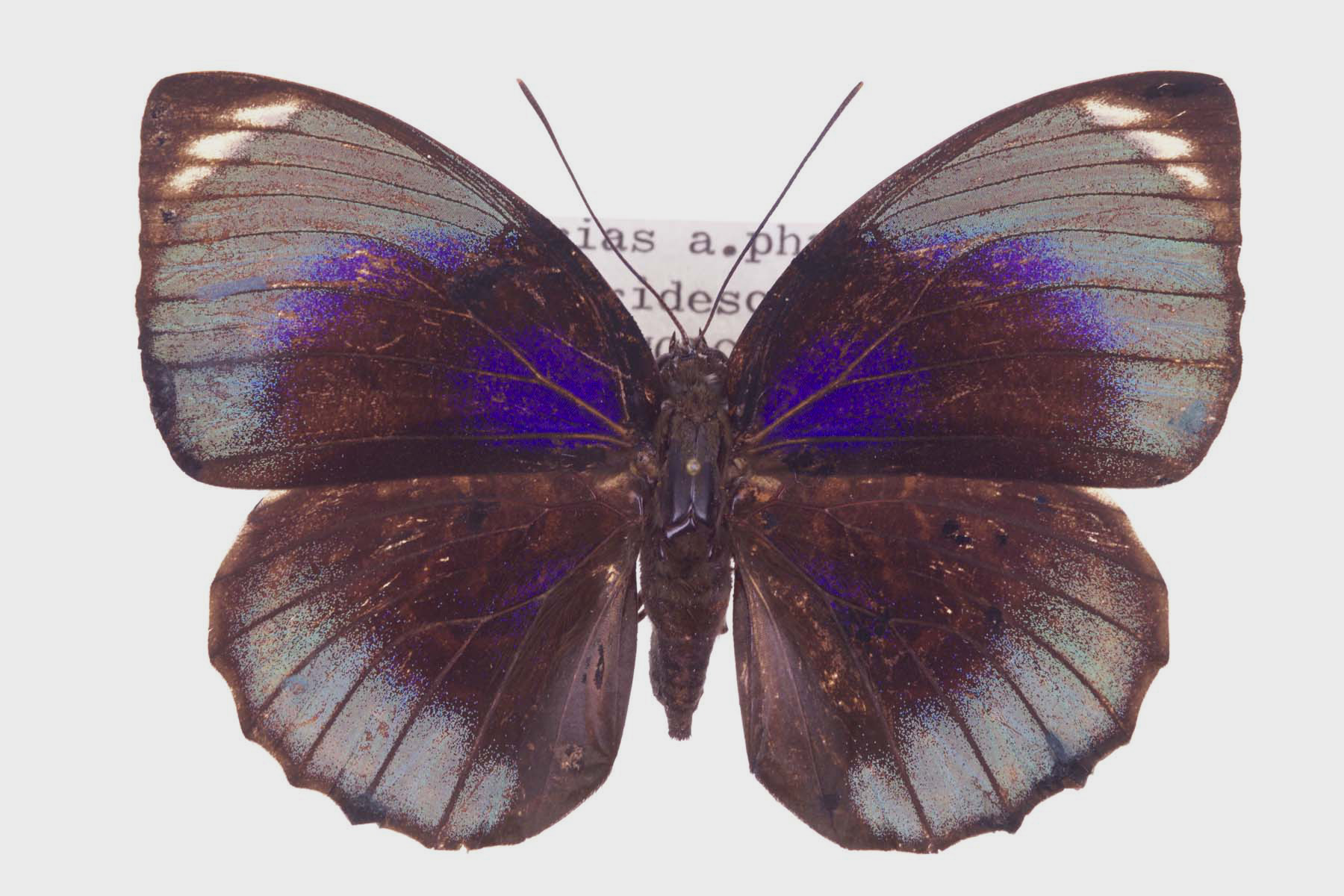
Agrias amydon phalcidon upperside

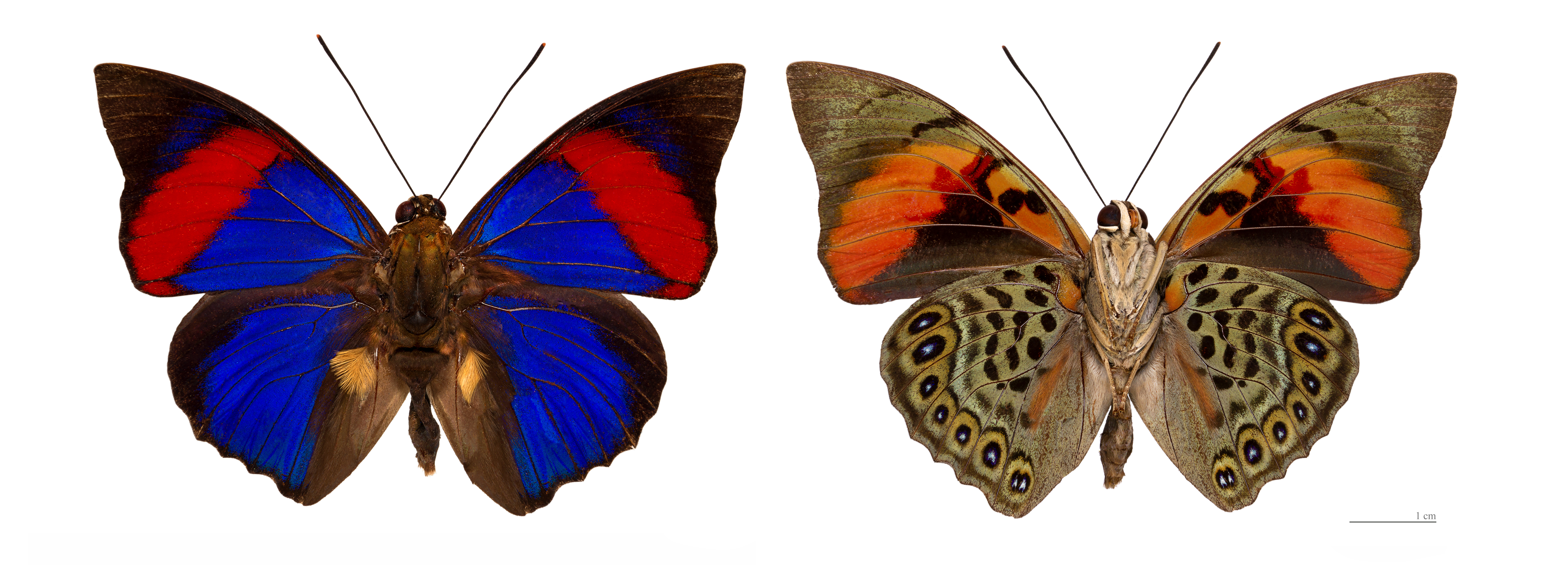
Agrias narcissus narcissus both sides

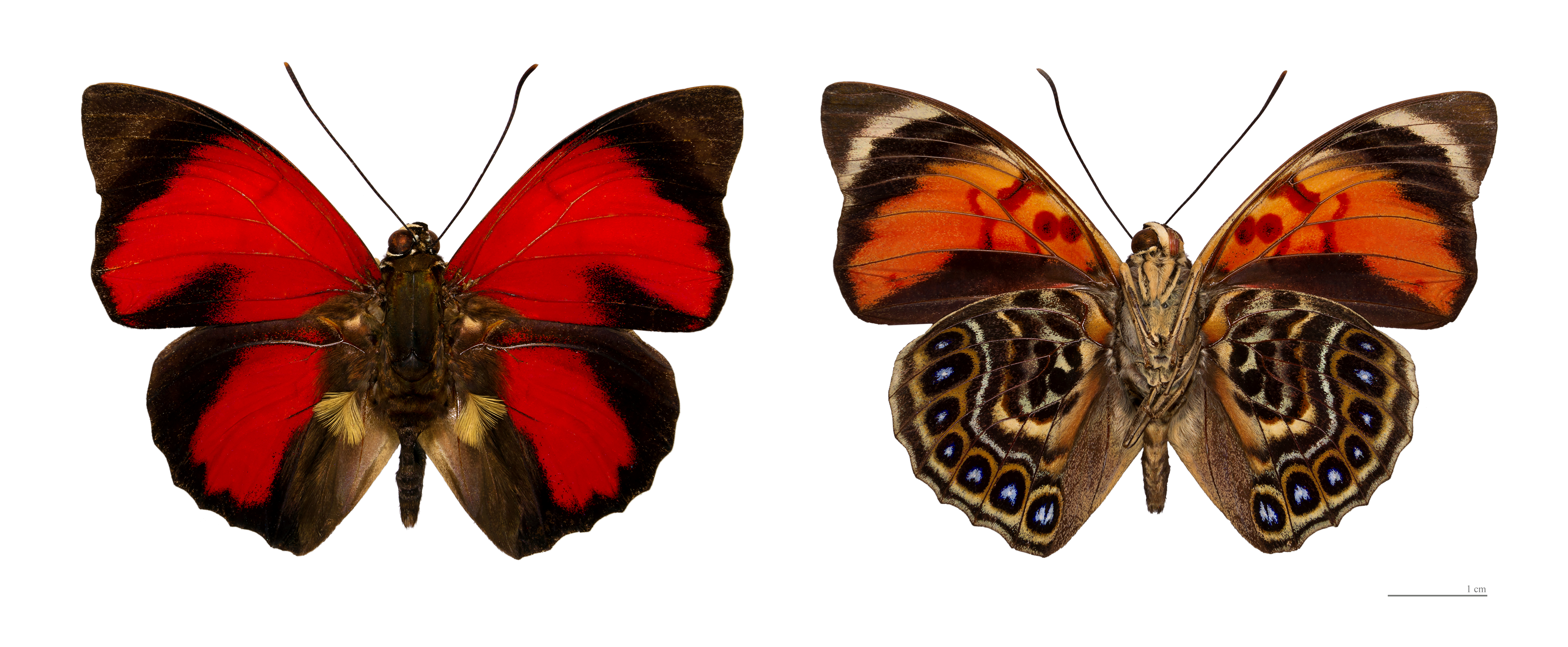
Agrias claudina claudina both sides

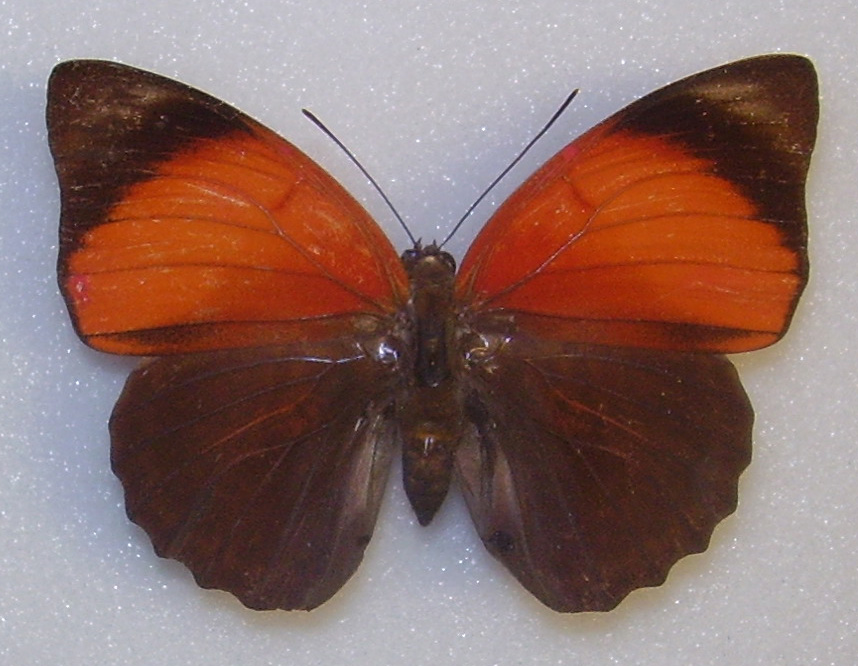
Agrias claudina wachenheimi upperside

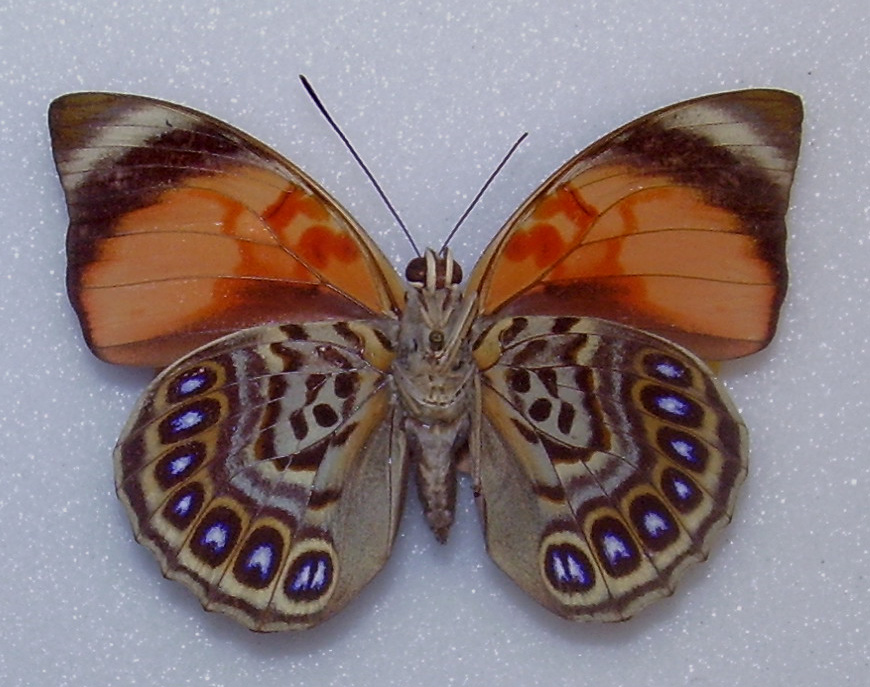
Agrias claudina satanas underside
