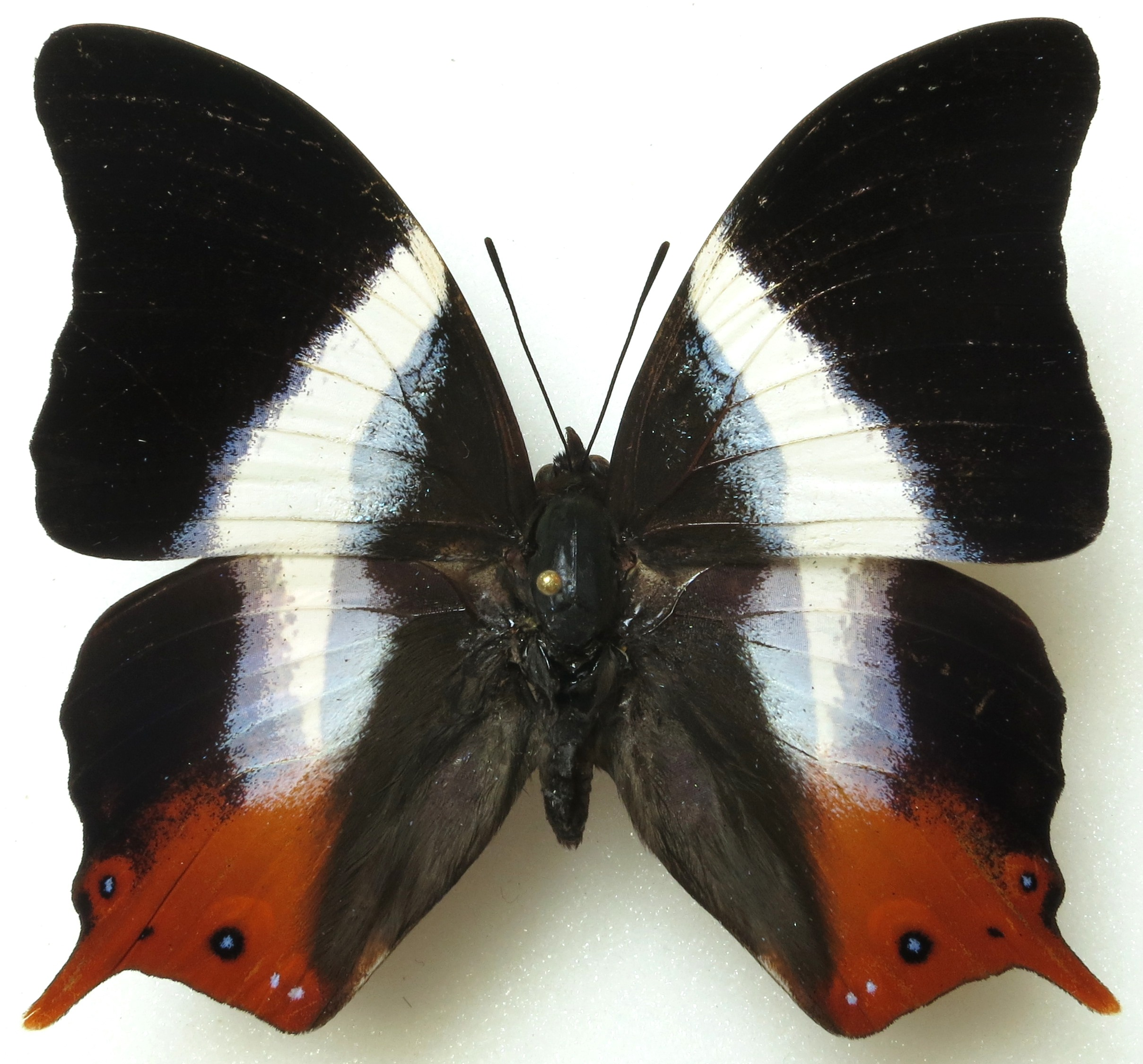
- Male from Maka, CAR

Scientific classification
- Kingdom: Animalia
- Phylum: Arthropoda
- Clade: Pancrustacea
- Class: Insecta
- Order: Lepidoptera
- Family: Nymphalidae
- Genus: Palla
- Species: P. violinitens

Binomial name
- Palla violinitens (Crowley, 1890)

Synonyms
- Philognoma violinitens Crowley, 1890; Charaxes coniger Butler, 1896

= Palla violinitens =

Species of butterfly

Palla violinitens, the violet-banded palla, is a butterfly in the family Nymphalidae. It is found in Guinea, Sierra Leone, Liberia, Ivory Coast, Ghana, Benin, Nigeria, Cameroon, the Republic of the Congo, the Central African Republic, Angola, the Democratic Republic of the Congo and Uganda. The habitat consists of primary lowland evergreen forests.

The larvae feed on Bonomia poranoides and Clerodendron buchholzii.

== Subspecies ==
- Palla violinitens violinitens (Guinea, Sierra Leone, Liberia, Ivory Coast, Ghana, Benin, Nigeria)
- Palla violinitens coniger (Butler, 1896) (eastern Nigeria, Cameroon, Congo, Central African Republic, Angola, Democratic Republic of the Congo)
- Palla violinitens bwamba van Someren, 1975 (Democratic Republic of the Congo: Ituri Forest, Uganda: Bwamba Valley)
