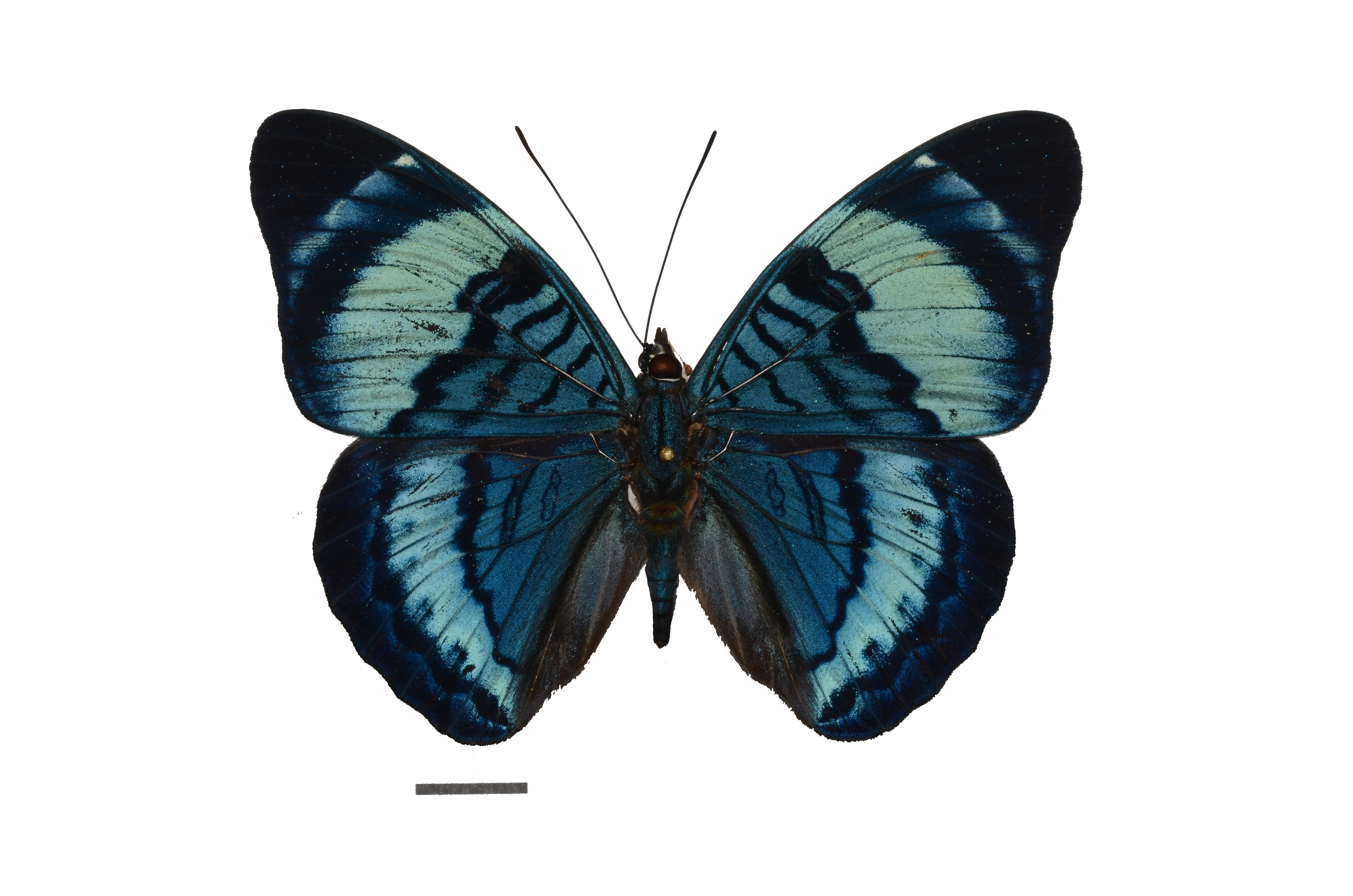
- Dorsal view
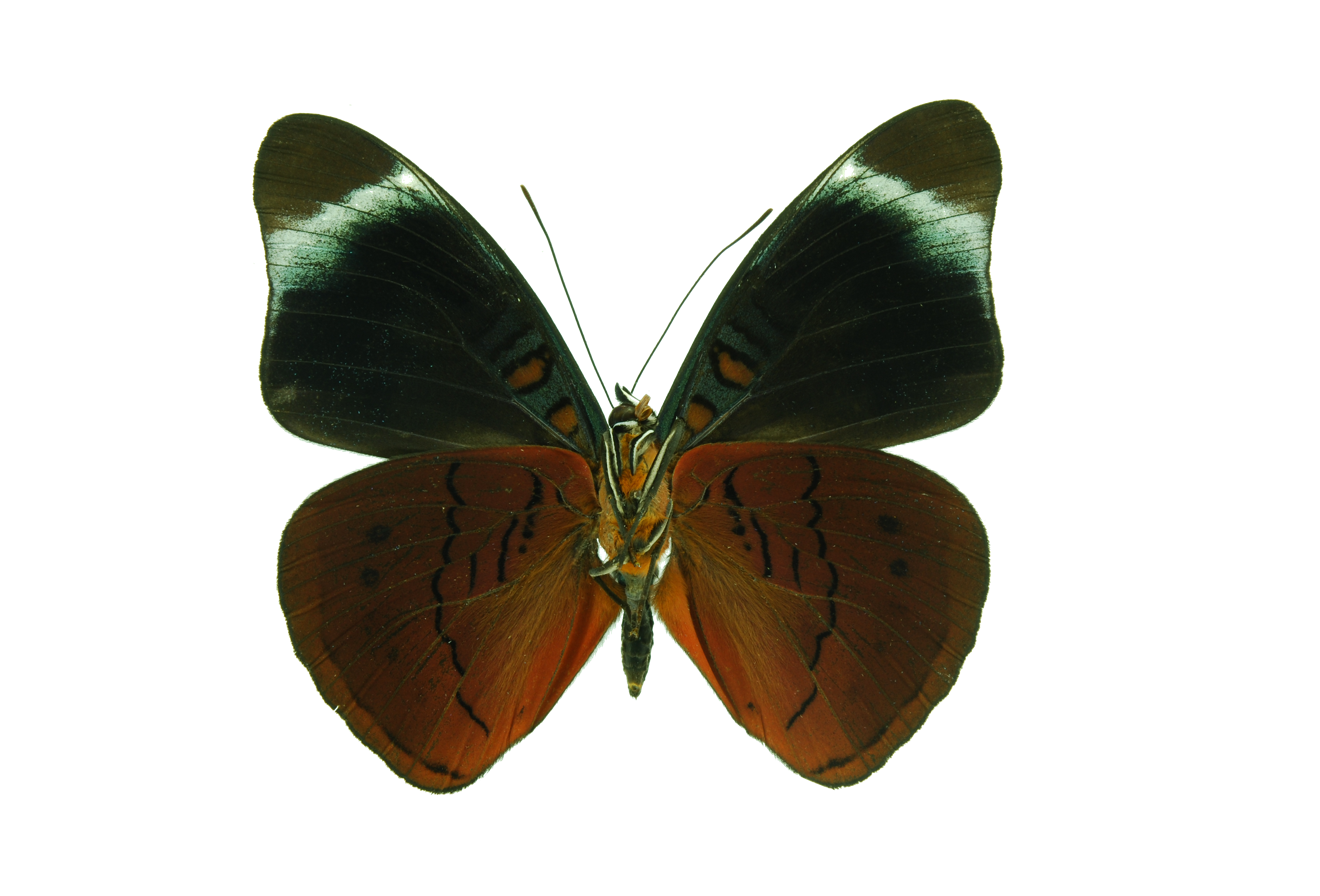
- Ventral view

Scientific classification
- Kingdom: Animalia
- Phylum: Arthropoda
- Class: Insecta
- Order: Lepidoptera
- Family: Nymphalidae
- Genus: Panacea
- Species: P. procilla

Binomial name
- Panacea procilla (Hewitson, 1852)

Synonyms
- Pandora procilla Hewitson, 1852; Panacea lysimache Godman & Salvin, [1883]

= Panacea procilla =

Species of butterfly

Panacea procilla, the Procilla beauty, is a species of butterfly of the family Nymphalidae. It is found from Panama to the Amazon basin and Colombia.

The wingspan is 80–95 mm.

== Subspecies ==
- Panacea procilla procilla (western Venezuela)
- Panacea procilla lysimache Godman & Salvin, [1883] (Panama (Volcan Chiriqui), Costa Rica)
- Panacea procilla ocana Fruhstorfer, 1912 (Colombia (lower Magdalena River))
- Panacea procilla salacia Fruhstorfer, 1915 (Colombia)
- Panacea procilla mamorensis Hall, 1917 (Brazil (Rondônia))
