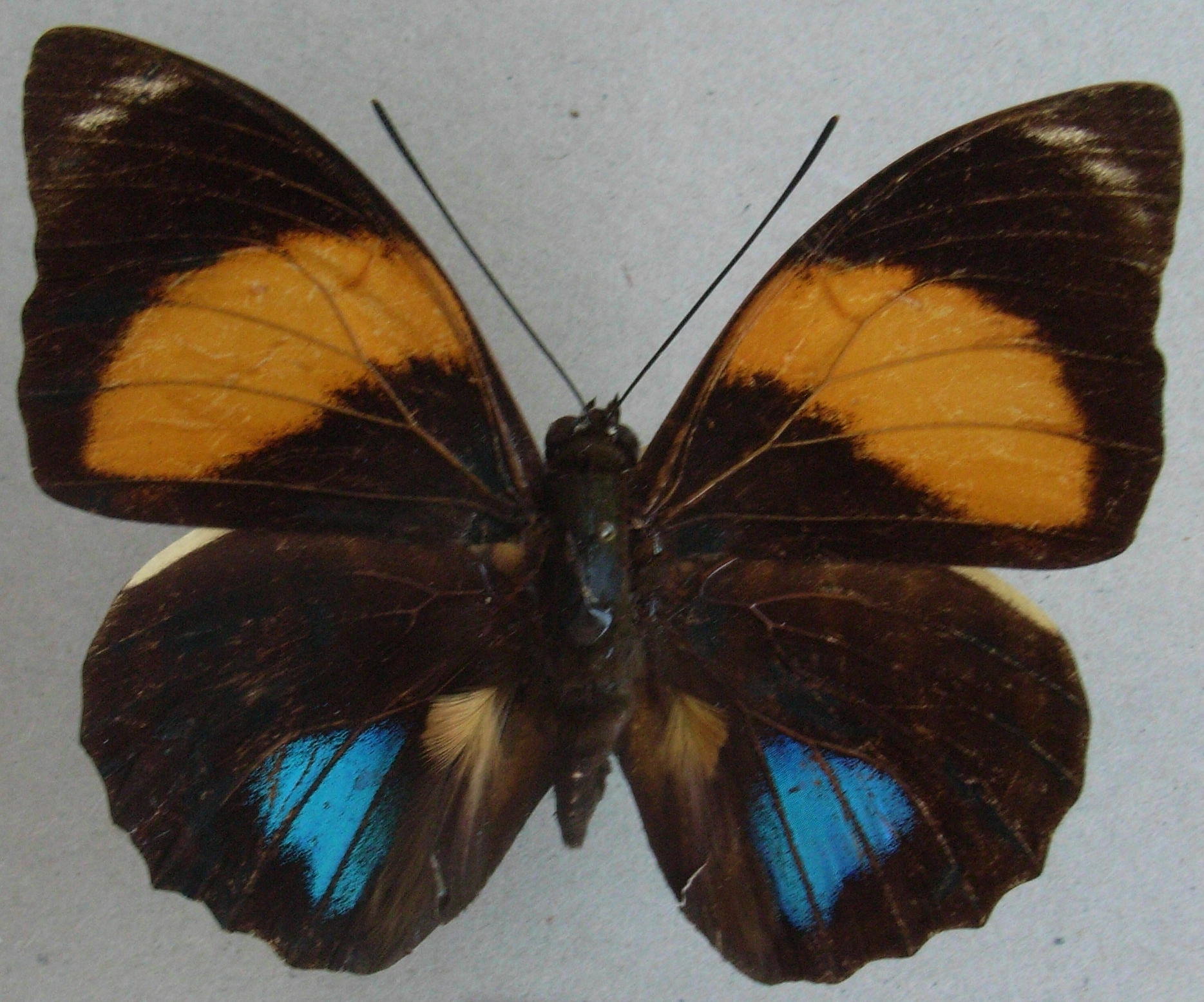
- A. a. frontina

Scientific classification
- Domain: Eukaryota
- Kingdom: Animalia
- Phylum: Arthropoda
- Class: Insecta
- Order: Lepidoptera
- Family: Nymphalidae
- Genus: Agrias
- Species: A. amydon

Binomial name
- Agrias amydon Hewitson, [1854]

Synonyms
- Agrias phalcidon Hewitson, 1855; Agrias pericles Bates, 1860; Agrias anaxagoras Staudinger, 1886; Agrias eleonora Fruhstorfer, 1895; Agrias mapiri Fassl, 1913

= Agrias amydon =

Species of butterfly

Agrias amydon, the Amydon agrias or white-spotted agrias, is a butterfly of the family Nymphalidae. It is found in Mexico, Central America, and South America.

The larvae feed on Erythroxylum species including E. havanense.

== Subspecies ==
- A. a. amydon (Colombia)
- A. a. phalcidon (Brazil)
- A. a. zenodorus (Ecuador, northern Peru)
- A. a. amydonius (Peru (Loreto, Iquitos), Brazil (Amazonas), Colombia)
- A. a. boliviensis (Bolivia (Yungas), Peru)
- A. a. bogotana (western Venezuela to north-eastern Colombia)
- A. a. frontina (north-western Ecuador (Rio Mira), western Colombia)
- A. a. ferdinandi (Brazil (Mato Grosso, Minas Gerais, Goiás, Bahia, Pernambuco), Bolivia)
- A. a. aurantiaca (Brazil (Pará, Amazonas), Surinam, south-western Venezuela)
- A. a. aristoxenus (Peru, Bolivia)
- A. a. excelsior (Brazil (Amazonas))
- A. a. uniformis (Brazil (Roraima), southern Venezuela)
- A. a. rubella (Brazil (Amazonas))
- A. a. oaxacata (Mexico (Oaxaca))
- A. a. smalli (Panama)
- A. a. philatelica (Mexico (Chiapas), Costa Rica)
- A. a. lacandona (Mexico)

There is also an undescribed subspecies from Venezuela.

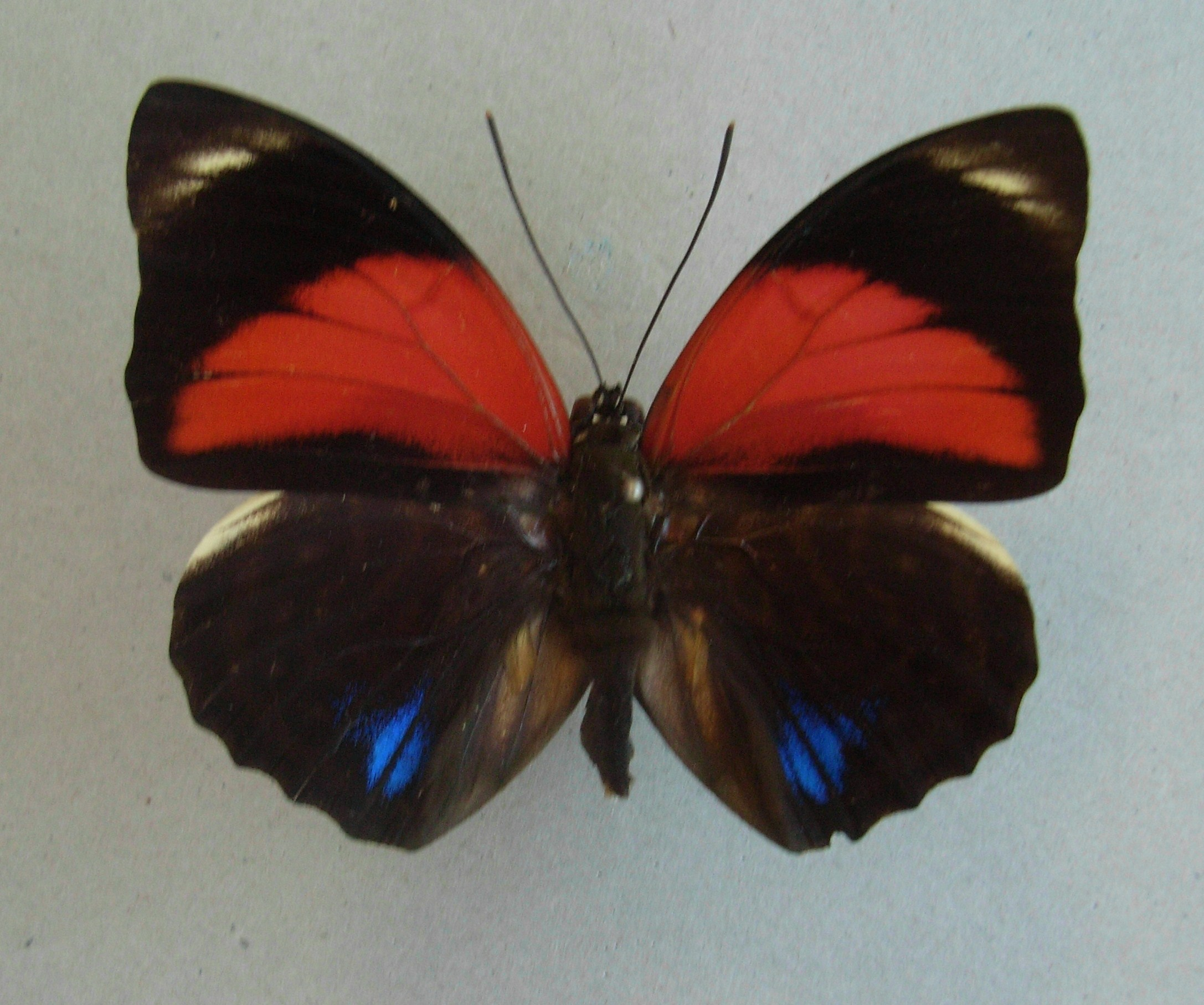
A. a. amydonius

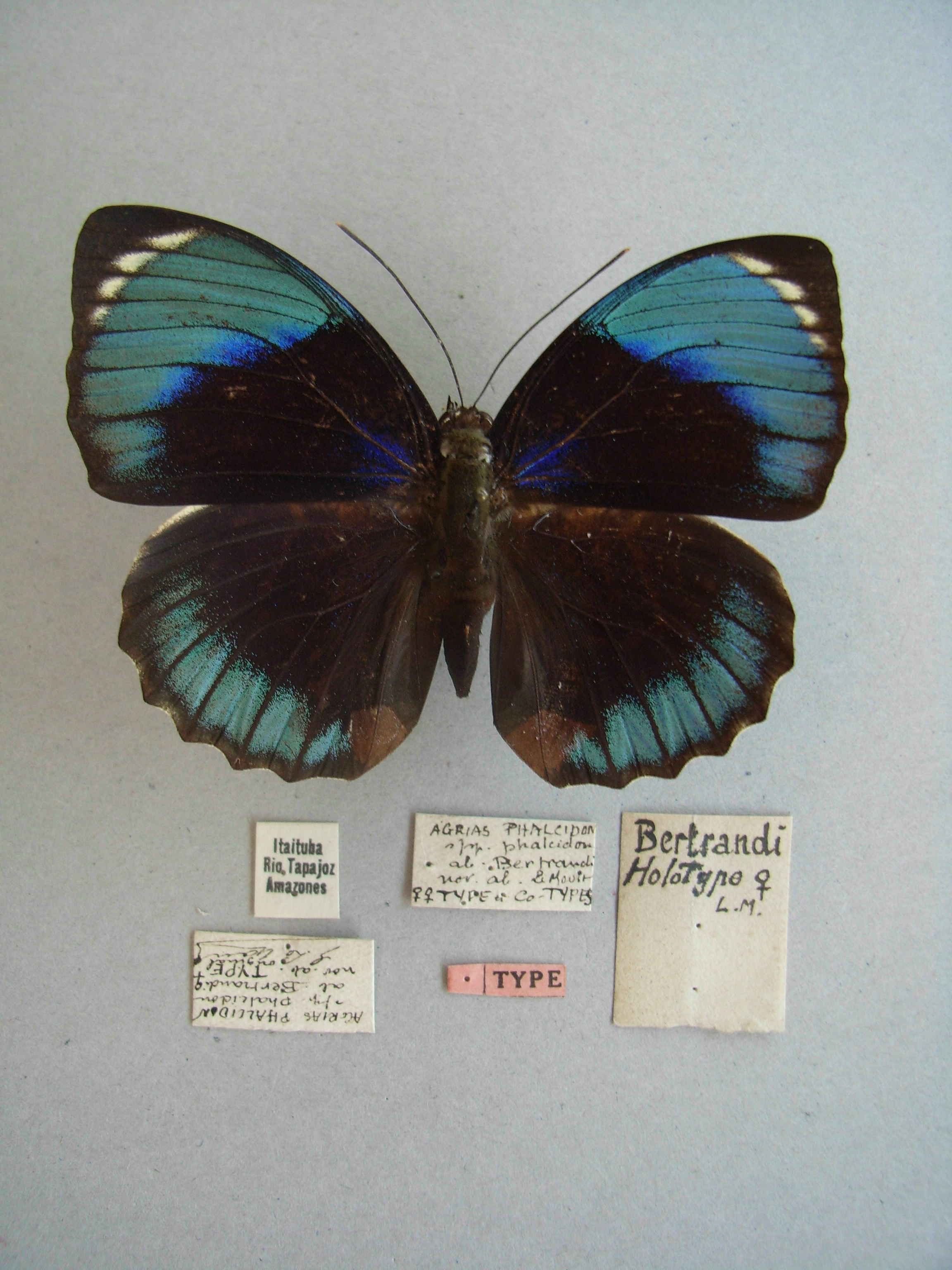
A. a. phalcidon
