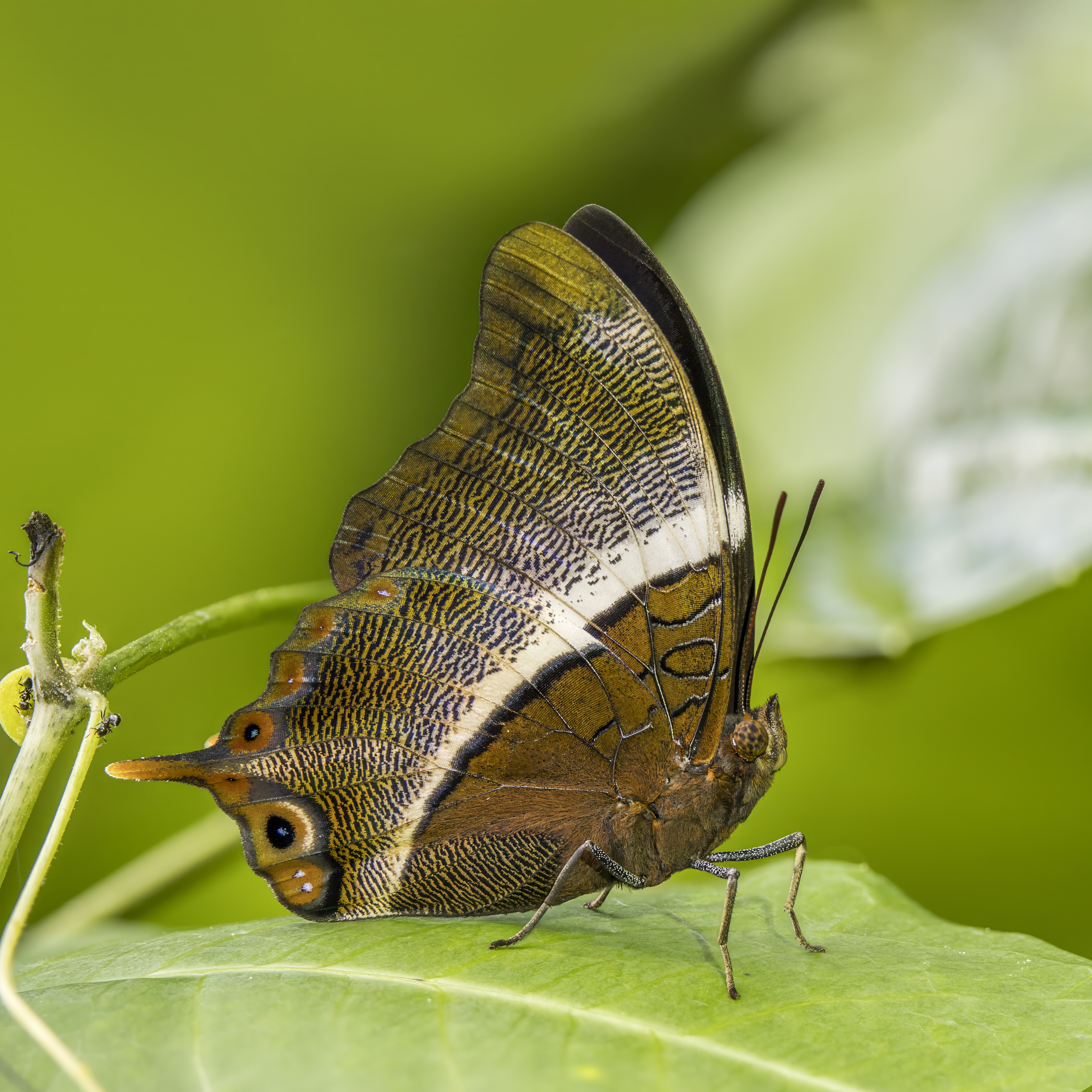
- male P. u. ussheri from Ghana

Scientific classification
- Kingdom: Animalia
- Phylum: Arthropoda
- Clade: Pancrustacea
- Class: Insecta
- Order: Lepidoptera
- Family: Nymphalidae
- Genus: Palla
- Species: P. ussheri

Binomial name
- Palla ussheri (Butler, 1870)

Synonyms
- Philognoma ussheri Butler, 1870; Palla ussheri ab. ferruginea Schultze, 1914; Palla moderata Gaede, 1915; Philognoma dobelli Hall, 1919

= Palla ussheri =

Species of butterfly

Palla ussheri, or Ussher's palla, is a butterfly in the family Nymphalidae. It is found in Guinea, Sierra Leone, Liberia, Ivory Coast, Ghana, Nigeria, Cameroon, Gabon, the Republic of the Congo, the Central African Republic, the Democratic Republic of the Congo, Uganda, Tanzania and Zambia. The habitat consists of lowland evergreen forests.

The larvae feed on Dichapetalum species, Prevostea breviflora, Bonomia poranoides and Toddalia asiatica.

== Subspecies ==
- Palla ussheri ussheri (Guinea, Sierra Leone, Liberia, Ivory Coast, Ghana, Nigeria)
- Palla ussheri dobelli (Hall, 1919) (Cameroon, Gabon, Congo, Central African Republic, western and central Democratic Republic of the Congo)
- Palla ussheri interposita Joicey & Talbot, 1925 (central and western Uganda, western Tanzania, Zambia)

Torben Larsen developed a species numbering system for his 2005 publication Butterflies of West Africa. The nominate subspecies is #785. The 'Larsen' numbers have since been used with permission in A Sharp Eye on Butterflies of Ghana.
