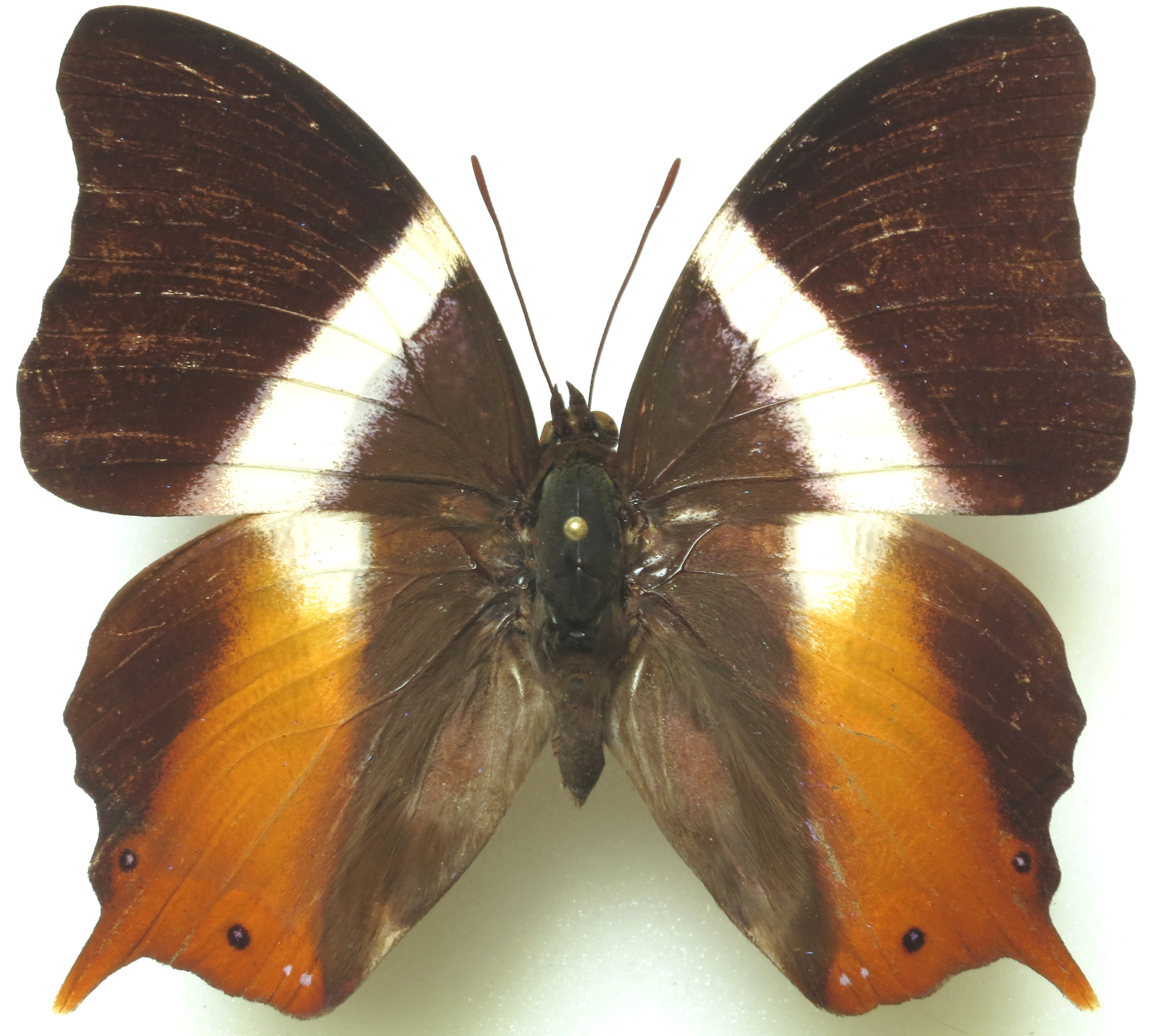
- Male from Bimon, CAR

Scientific classification
- Kingdom: Animalia
- Phylum: Arthropoda
- Clade: Pancrustacea
- Class: Insecta
- Order: Lepidoptera
- Family: Nymphalidae
- Genus: Palla
- Species: P. publius

Binomial name
- Palla publius Staudinger, 1892

Synonyms
- Palla rectifascia Weymer, 1892

= Palla publius =

Species of butterfly

Palla publius, the andromorph palla, is a butterfly in the family Nymphalidae. It is found in Sierra Leone, Ivory Coast, Ghana, Nigeria, Cameroon, Gabon, the Republic of the Congo, the Central African Republic, the Democratic Republic of the Congo and Tanzania. The habitat consists of primary lowland evergreen forests.

== Subspecies ==
- Palla publius publius (Sierra Leone, Ivory Coast, Ghana, Nigeria)
- Palla publius centralis van Someren, 1975 (Cameroon, Gabon, Congo, Central African Republic, northern, eastern and southern Democratic Republic of the Congo)
- Palla publius kigoma van Someren, 1975 (north-western Tanzania)

Torben Larsen developed a species numbering system for his 2005 publication Butterflies of West Africa. The nominate subspecies is #786. The 'Larsen' numbers have since been used with permission in A Sharp Eye on Butterflies of Ghana.
