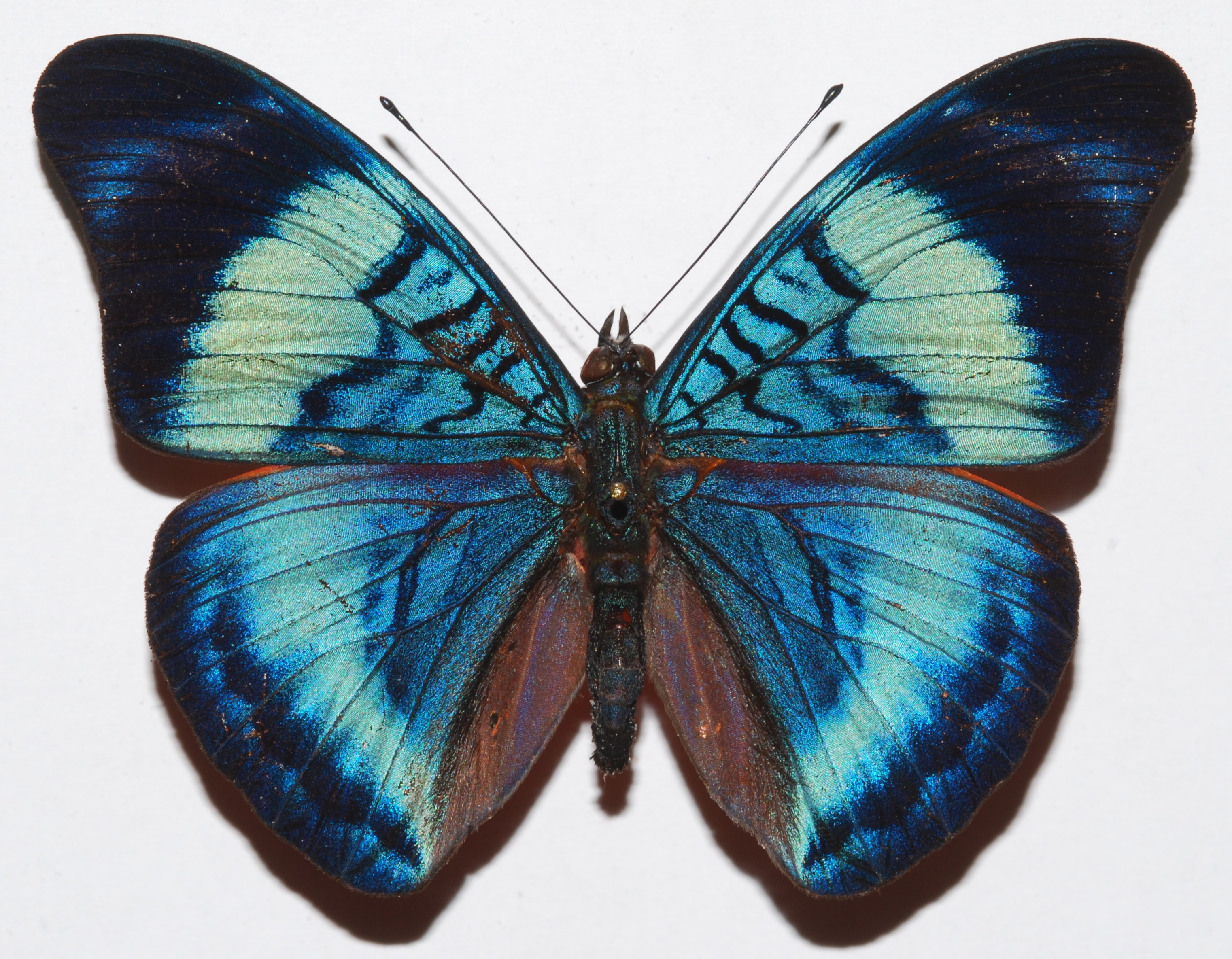

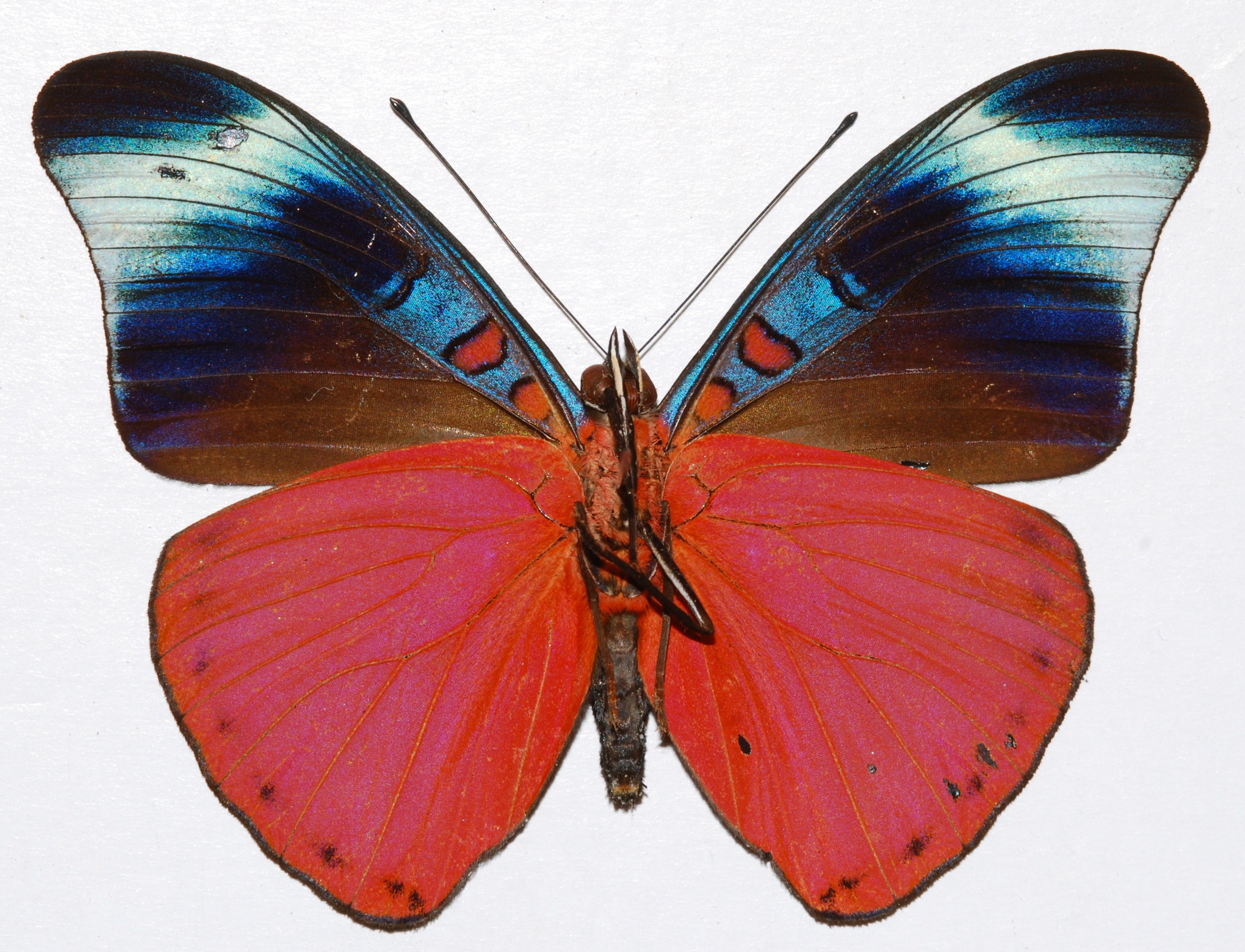

Scientific classification
- Domain: Eukaryota
- Kingdom: Animalia
- Phylum: Arthropoda
- Class: Insecta
- Order: Lepidoptera
- Family: Nymphalidae
- Genus: Panacea
- Species: P. prola

Binomial name
- Panacea prola (Doubleday, [1848])

Synonyms
- Pandora prola Doubleday, [1848]; Pandora prola Westwood, [1850]

= Panacea prola =

Species of butterfly

Panacea prola, the prola beauty or red flasher, is a species of butterfly of the family Nymphalidae. It is found from Costa Rica to southern Brazil, but is most common in the foothills of the eastern Peruvian Andes.

The wingspan is 65–75 mm. The underside of the hindwings is bright red without markings.

== Subspecies ==
- Panacea prola prola (Colombia, Venezuela)
- Panacea prola zaraja Fruhstorfer, 1912 (Venezuela)
- Panacea prola amazonica Fruhstorfer, 1915 (Upper Amazon, Peru, Ecuador)
- Panacea prola prolifica Fruhstorfer, 1915 (Ecuador)
