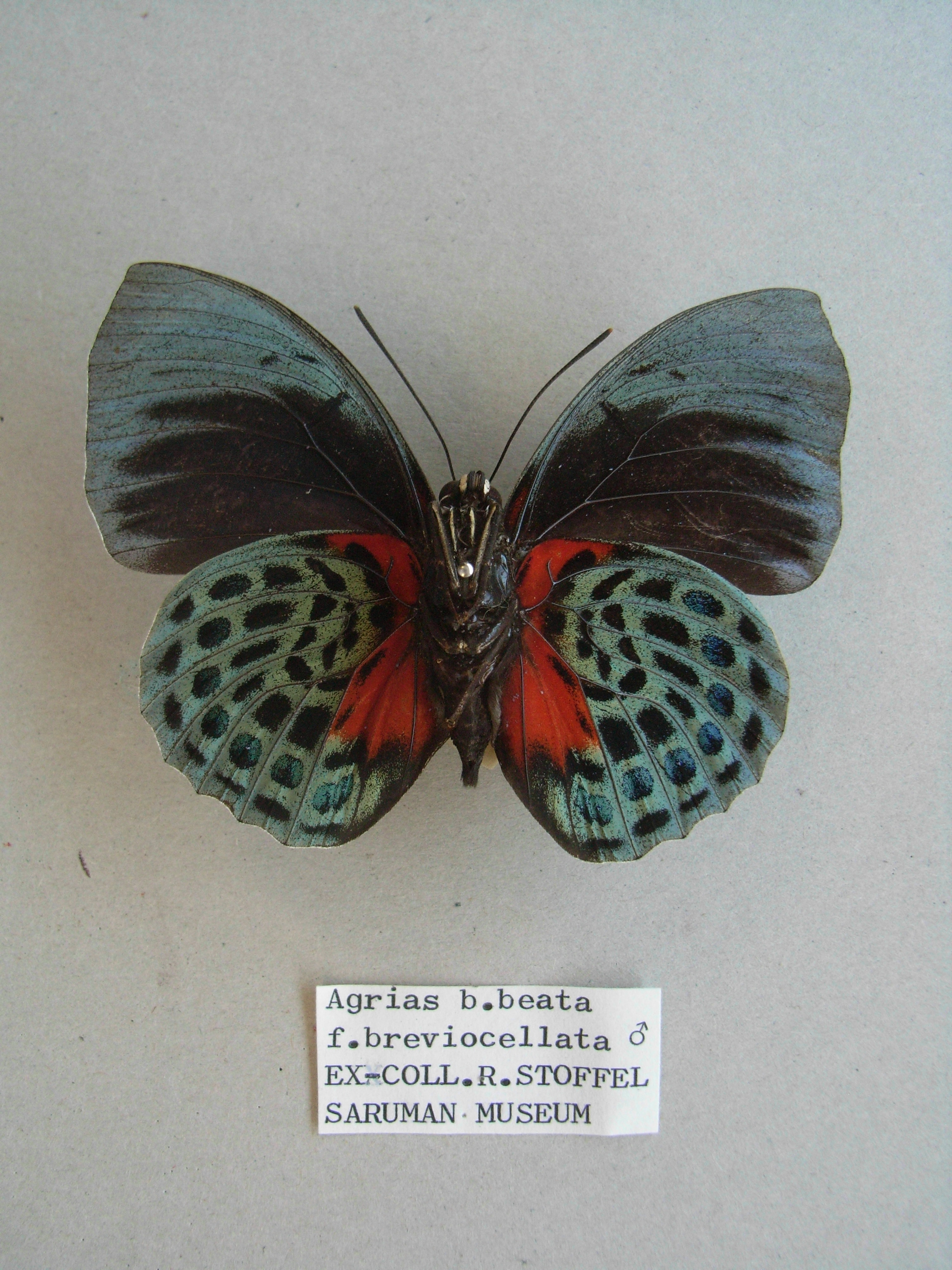
- Agrias hewitsonius beata
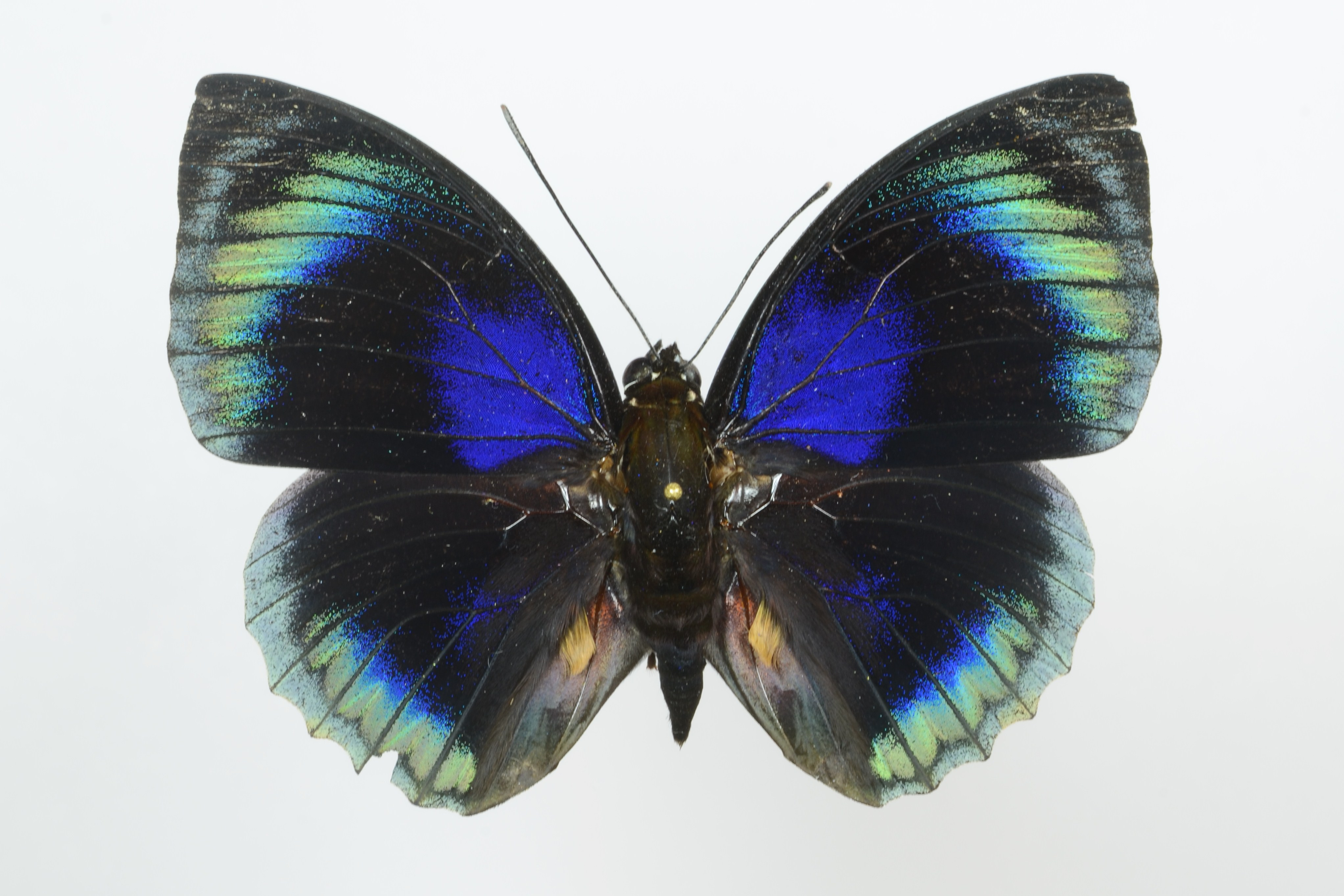
- Dorsal view

Scientific classification
- Domain: Eukaryota
- Kingdom: Animalia
- Phylum: Arthropoda
- Class: Insecta
- Order: Lepidoptera
- Family: Nymphalidae
- Genus: Agrias
- Species: A. hewitsonius

Binomial name
- Agrias hewitsonius Bates, 1860

Synonyms
- Agrias beatifica Hewitson, 1869

= Agrias hewitsonius =

Species of butterfly

Agrias hewitsonius is a butterfly of the family Nymphalidae. It is found in South America. It was described by Henry Walter Bates in 1860.

== Subspecies ==
- Agrias hewitsonius hewitsonius (Brazil (Amazonas))
- Agrias hewitsonius beatifica (Ecuador, Peru)
- Agrias hewitsonius stuarti (Peru, Colombia, Brazil (Amazonas))
- Agrias hewitsonius beata (Peru)

== Gallery ==
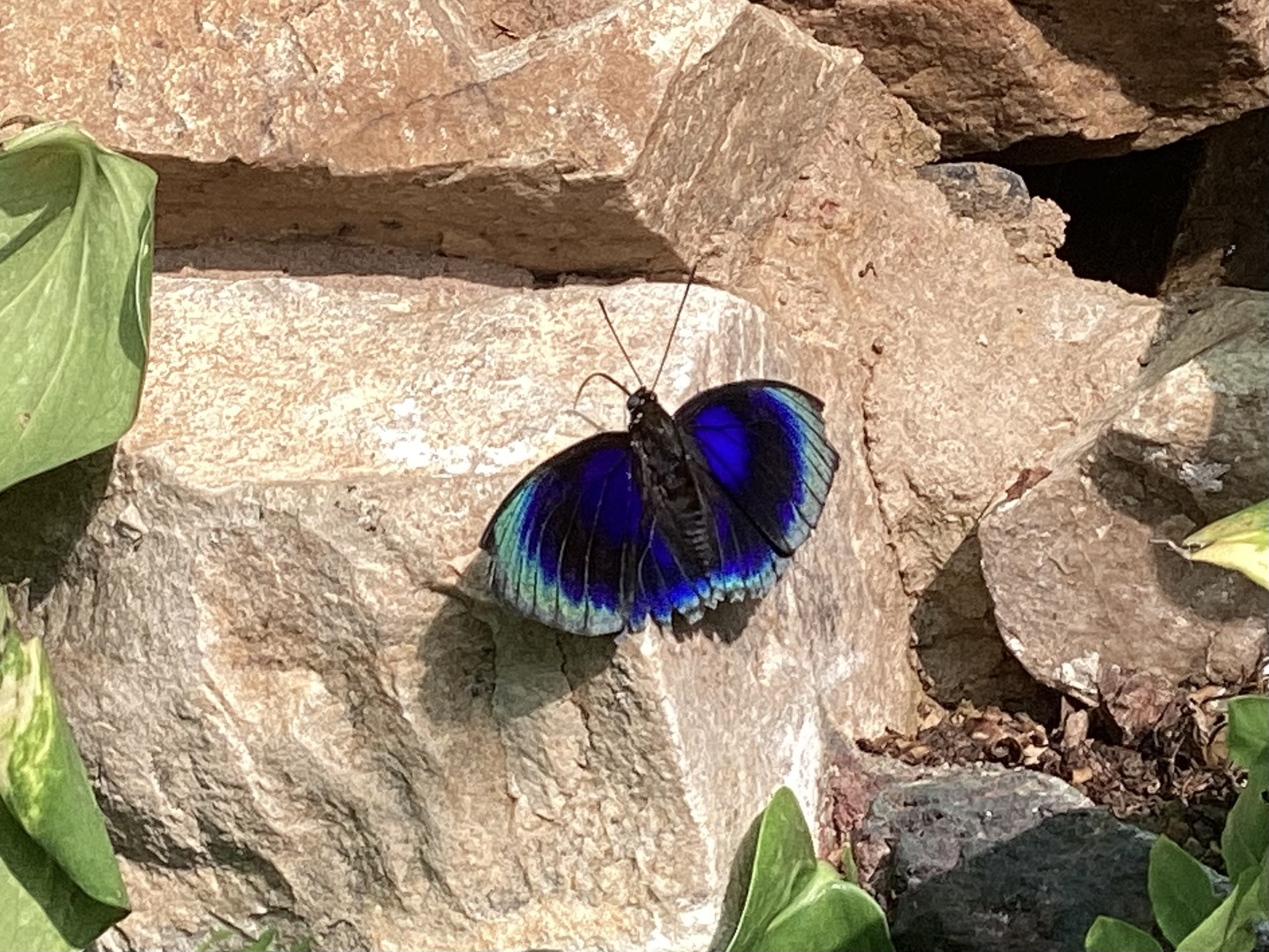
The species basking on a rock
