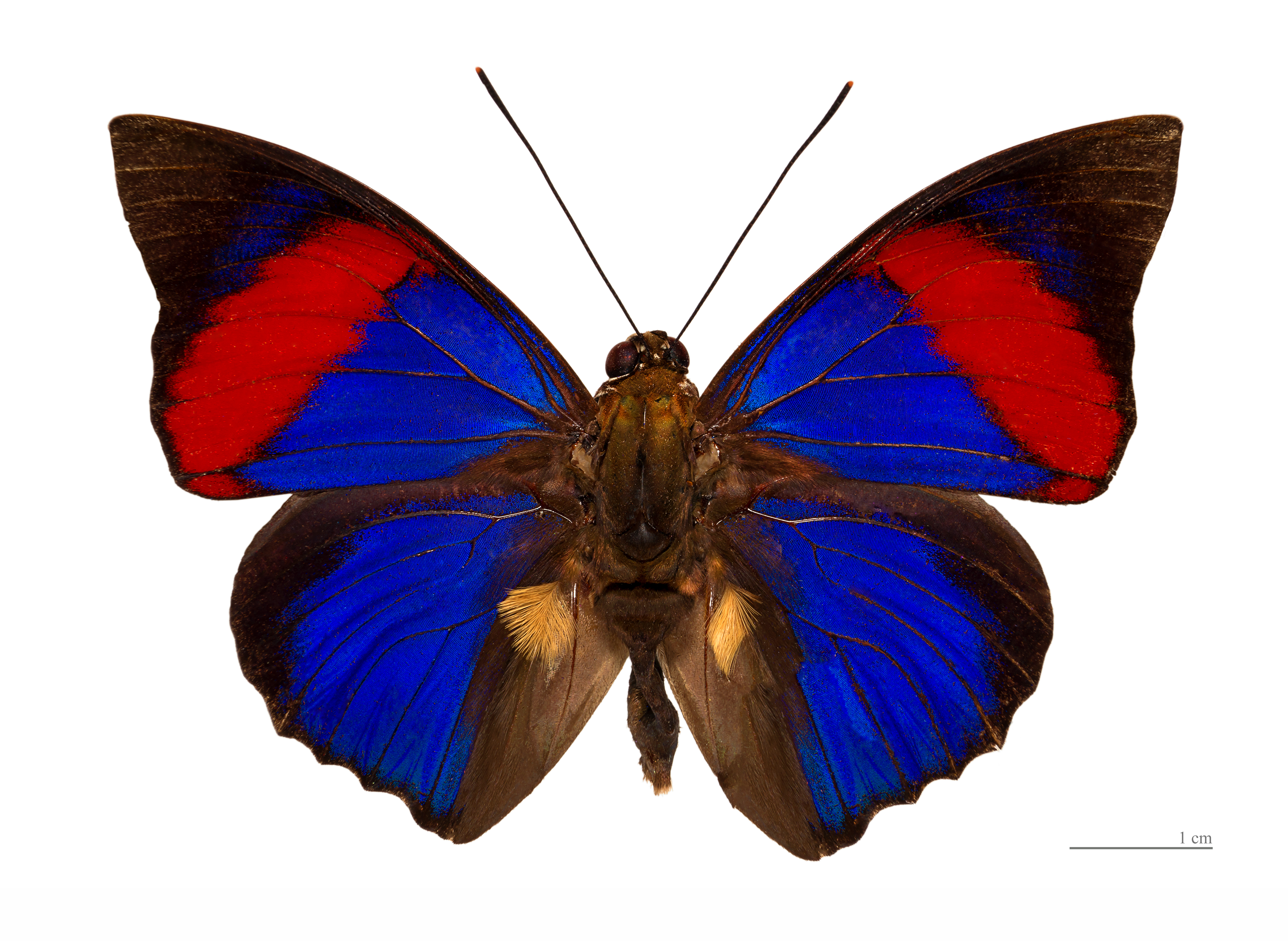
- A. n. narcissus - MHNT
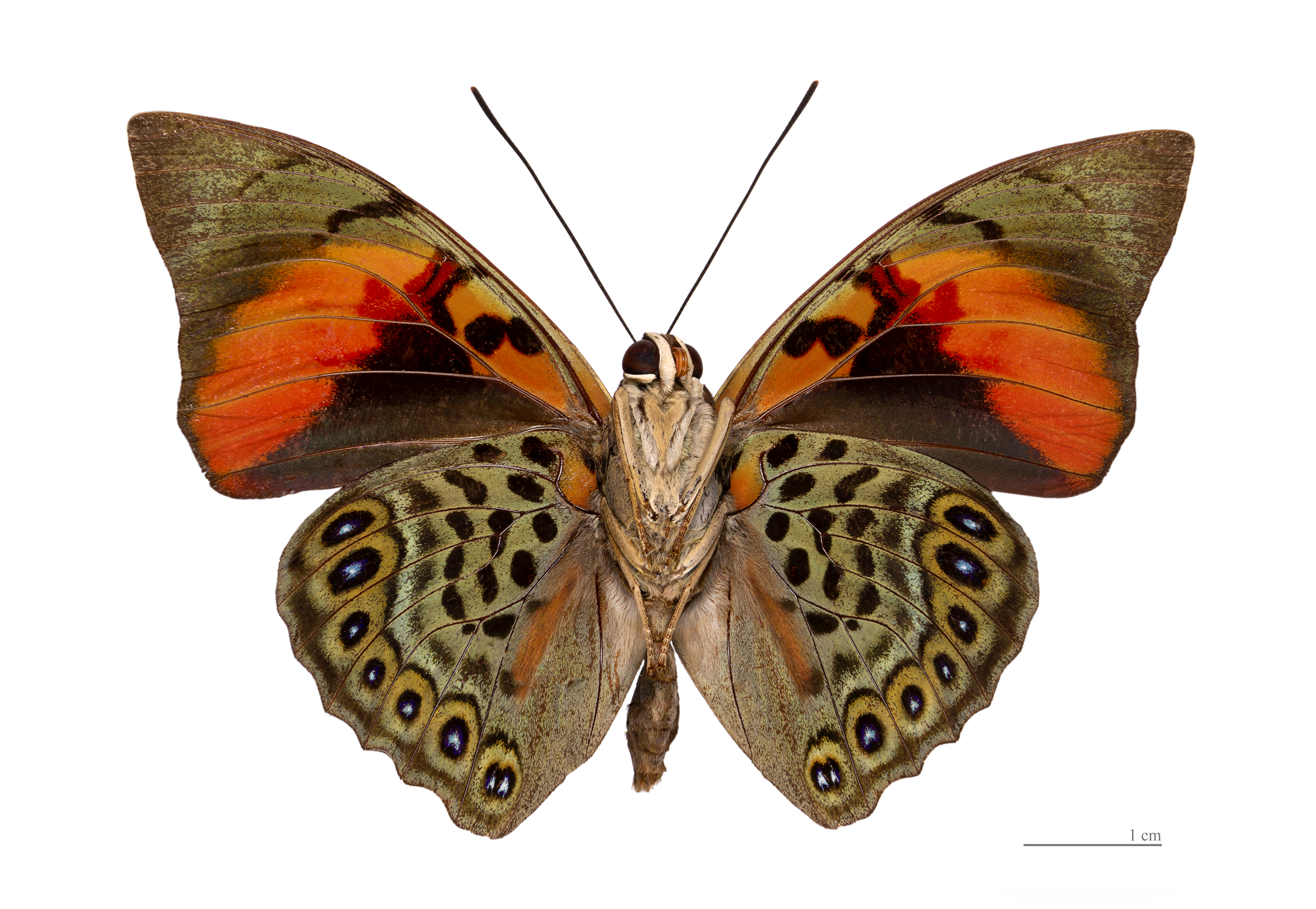
- A. n. narcissus, ventral side

Scientific classification
- Kingdom: Animalia
- Phylum: Arthropoda
- Class: Insecta
- Order: Lepidoptera
- Family: Nymphalidae
- Genus: Agrias
- Species: A. narcissus

Binomial name
- Agrias narcissus Staudinger, [1885]

= Agrias narcissus =

Species of butterfly

Agrias narcissus is a butterfly of the family Nymphalidae. It is found in South America.

== Subspecies ==
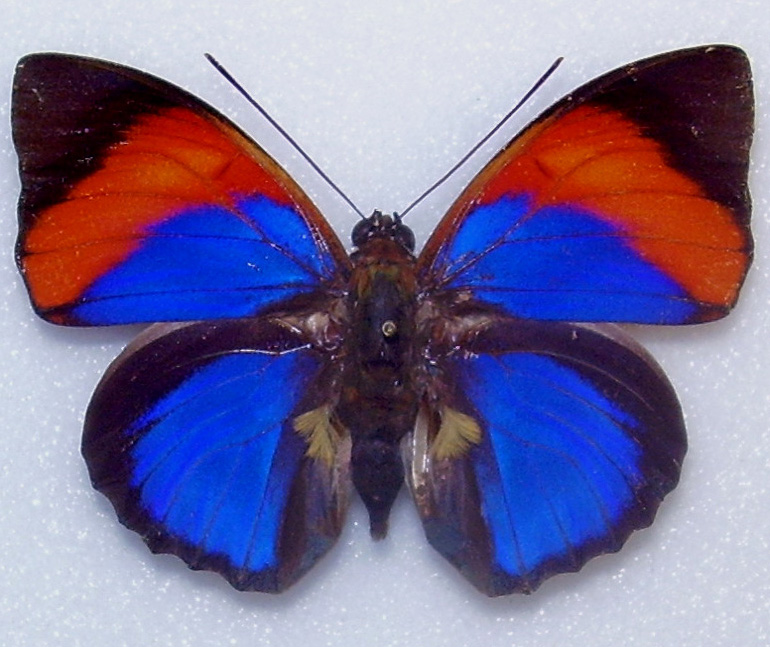
A. n. tapajonus

- A. n. narcissus (Surinam, French Guiana, Brazil (Amazonas, Amapá, Pará))
- A. n. tapajonus (Brazil (Pará, Amazonas))
- A. n. stoffeli (Venezuela (Sierra de Lema))
