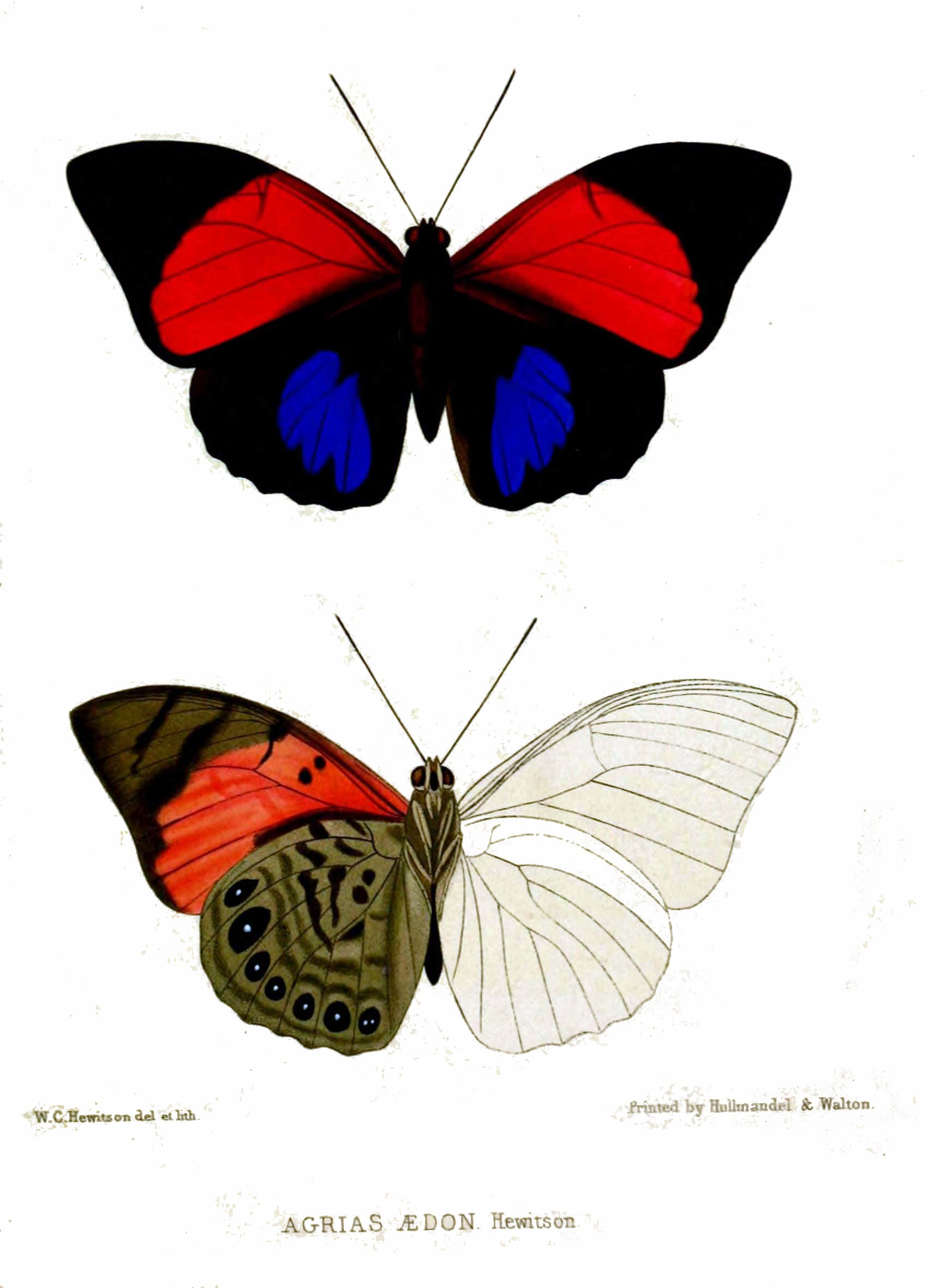
- Plate accompanying the original description in Proceedings of the Zoological Society of London

Scientific classification
- Domain: Eukaryota
- Kingdom: Animalia
- Phylum: Arthropoda
- Class: Insecta
- Order: Lepidoptera
- Family: Nymphalidae
- Genus: Agrias
- Species: A. aedon

Binomial name
- Agrias aedon Hewitson, [1848]

Synonyms
- Agrias salvini Fruhstorfer, 1895; Agrias aedon ab. magdalenae Schultze, 1928; Agrias aedon aedon schultzei Rebillard, 1961; Agrias aedon f. denhezi Descimon & Mast, 1975

= Agrias aedon =

Species of butterfly

Agrias aedon, the Aedon agrias, is a butterfly of the family Nymphalidae. It is found in the Neotropical realm.

== Subspecies ==
- A. a. aedon (Colombia, Venezuela, possibly Panama)
- A. a. rodriguezi Schaus, 1918 (Mexico, Guatemala, Costa Rica)
- A. a. pepitoensis Michael, 1930 (western Colombia)
