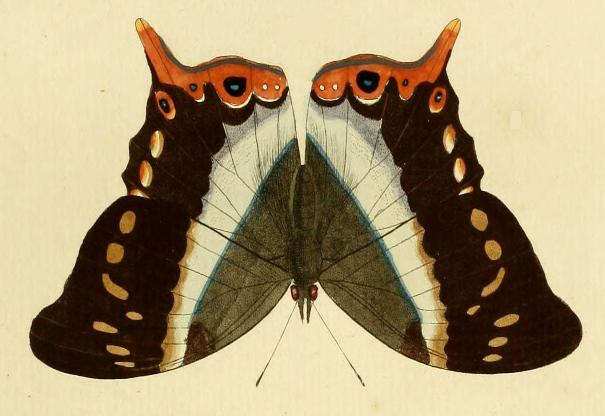

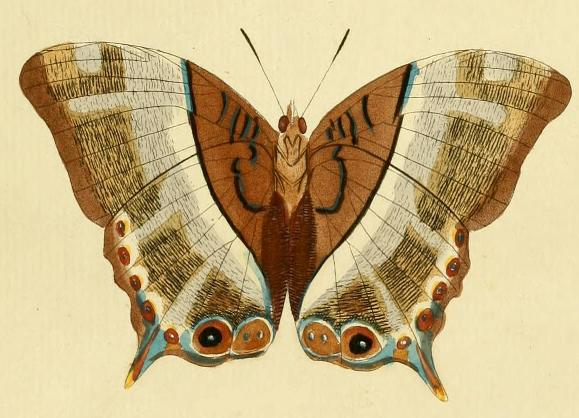

Scientific classification
- Kingdom: Animalia
- Phylum: Arthropoda
- Clade: Pancrustacea
- Class: Insecta
- Order: Lepidoptera
- Family: Nymphalidae
- Genus: Palla
- Species: P. decius

Binomial name
- Palla decius (Cramer, 1777)

Synonyms
- Papilio decius Cramer, 1777; Palla decius f. sagittaria Rousseau-Decelle, 1934

= Palla decius =

Species of butterfly

Palla decius, the white-banded palla, is a butterfly in the family Nymphalidae. It is found in Senegal, Guinea, Sierra Leone, Liberia, Ivory Coast, Ghana, Nigeria, Cameroon, the Republic of the Congo, the western part of the Democratic Republic of the Congo and northern Angola. The habitat consists of lowland evergreen forests.

The larvae feed on Calycobolus africanus, Bonomia poranoides and Clerodendron buchholzii.

Torben Larsen developed a species numbering system for his 2005 publication Butterflies of West Africa. This species is #784. The 'Larsen' numbers have since been used with permission in A Sharp Eye on Butterflies of Ghana.
