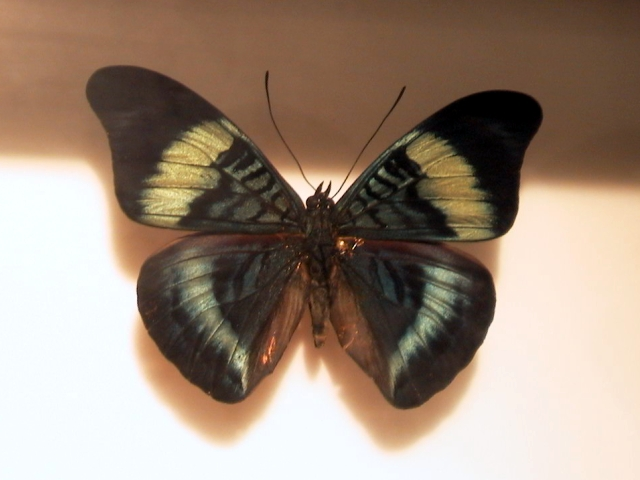
- Panacea prola

Scientific classification
- Kingdom: Animalia
- Phylum: Arthropoda
- Class: Insecta
- Order: Lepidoptera
- Family: Nymphalidae
- Tribe: Ageroniini
- Genus: Panacea; Godman & Salvin, [1883]

Species
- See text

Synonyms
- Pandora Doubleday, [1848]; Pandora Westwood, [1850]

= Panacea (butterfly) =

Genus of brush-footed butterflies

Panacea is a brush-footed butterfly genus found in Central America and South America. It is named after one of Asclepius's daughters Panacea.

== Species ==
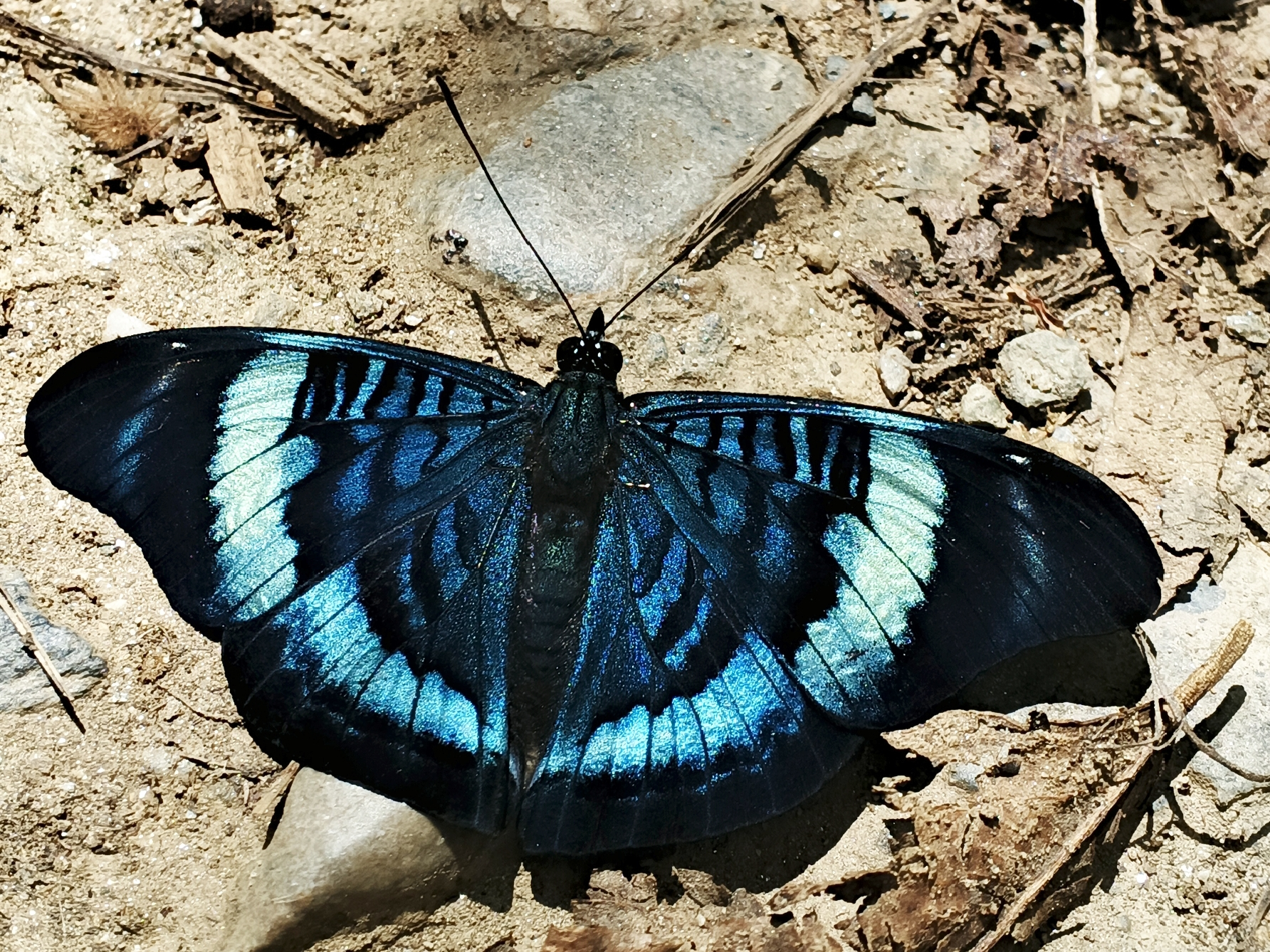
Panacea butterfly spreading its wings in El Ávila National Park, Venezuela.

Listed alphabetically:

- Panacea bleuzeni Plantrou & Attal, 1986
- Panacea chalcothea (Bates, 1868)
- Panacea divalis (Bates, 1868)
- Panacea procilla (Hewitson, 1852)
- Panacea prola (Doubleday, [1848])
- Panacea regina (Bates, 1864)
