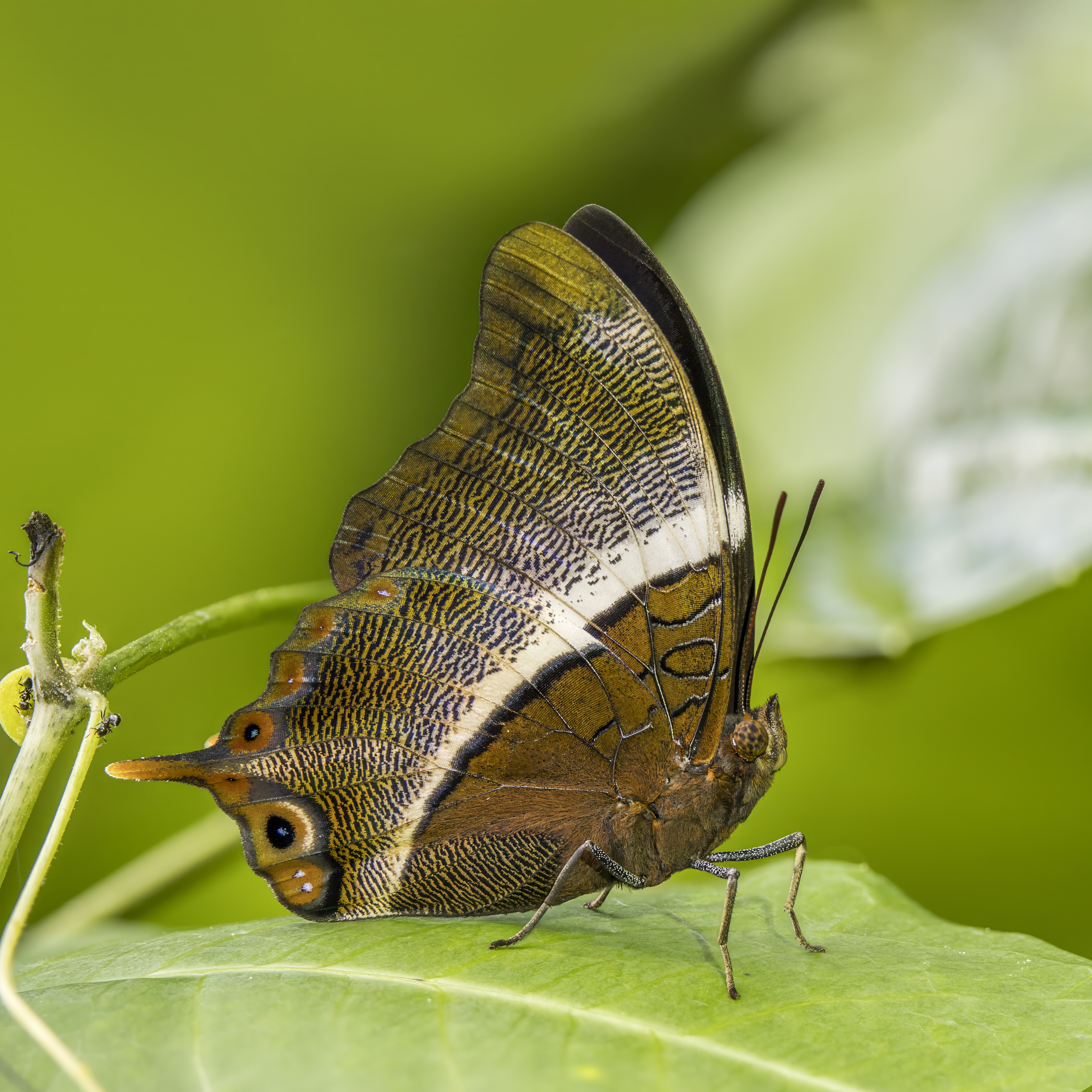
- P. u. ussheri from Ghana

Scientific classification
- Domain: Eukaryota
- Kingdom: Animalia
- Phylum: Arthropoda
- Class: Insecta
- Order: Lepidoptera
- Family: Nymphalidae
- Tribe: Pallini
- Genus: Palla; Hübner, [1819]

Type species
- Papilio decius Cramer, [1777]

Diversity
- Four species

Synonyms
- Philognoma Doubleday, 1844

= Palla (butterfly) =

Genus of brush-footed butterflies

Palla is an Afrotropical genus of butterflies in the subfamily Charaxinae. All four species exhibit sexual dimorphism.

== Species ==
- Palla decius (Cramer, [1777])
- Palla publius Staudinger, 1892
- Palla ussheri (Butler, 1870)
- Palla violinitens (Crowley, 1890)
