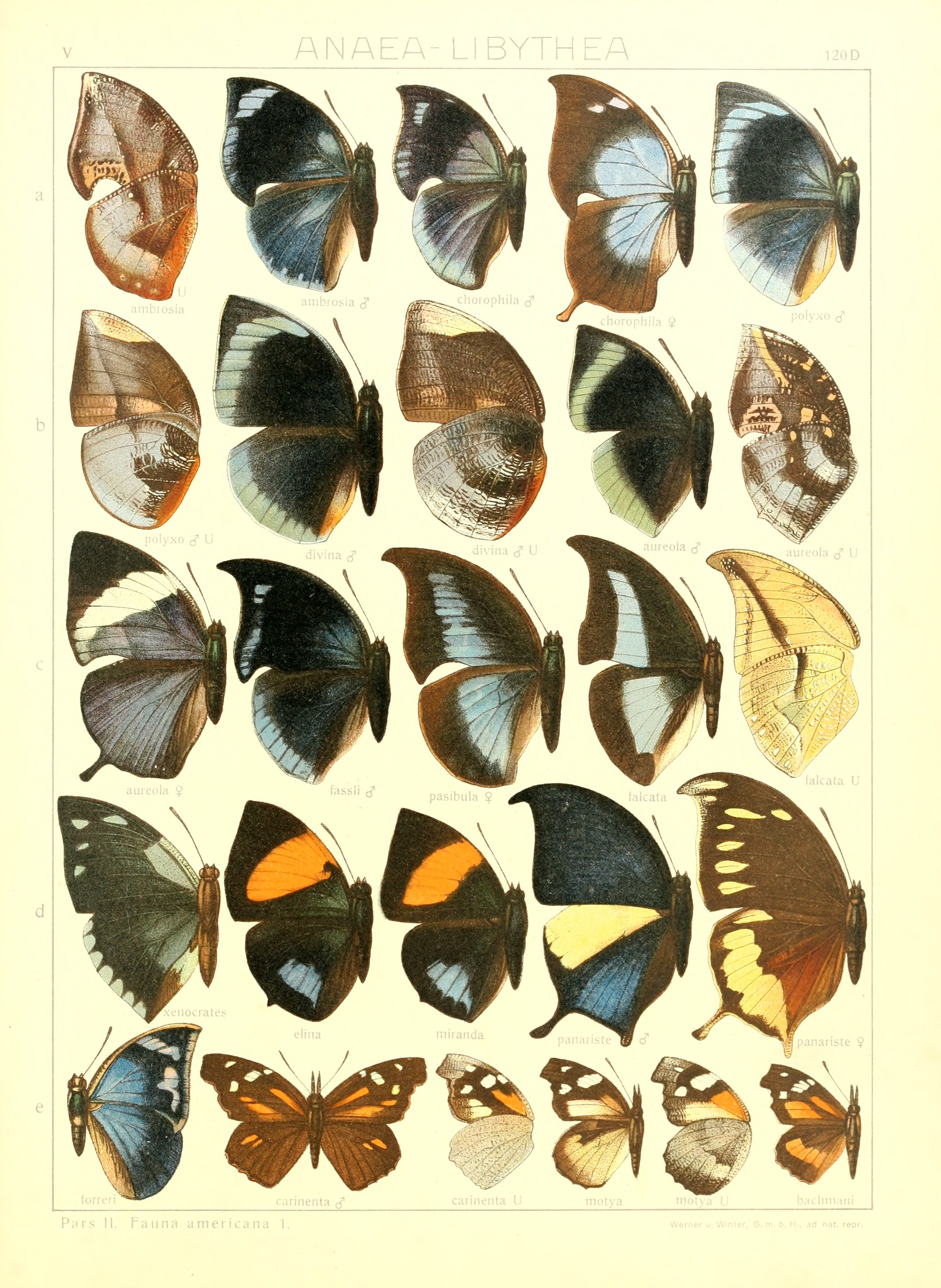
- subspecies pasibula and subspecies fassli in Seitz Macrolepidoptera of the World c

Scientific classification
- Kingdom: Animalia
- Phylum: Arthropoda
- Class: Insecta
- Order: Lepidoptera
- Family: Nymphalidae
- Tribe: Anaeini
- Genus: Memphis
- Species: M. pasibula

Binomial name
- Memphis pasibula (Doubleday, [1849])

Synonyms
- Paphia pasibula Doubleday, [1849]; Anaea pasibula fassli Röber, 1916; Mephis pasibula

= Memphis pasibula =

Species of butterfly

Memphis pasibula is a species of leafwing in the butterfly family Nymphalidae. It is found in Venezuela and Columbia (as ssp.fassli Röber, 1916).

Memphis pasibula is a butterfly with forewings with a humped costal edge, a pointed hooked apex, a concave outer edge near the apex and a very concave inner edge. The upper part is very dark, almost black. The underside is brown and simulates a dead leaf. According Röber it to occurs in two subspecies, the figured fassli subsp. nov. (128c) from East Colombia (Upper Rio Negro, 800 m) and Central Colombia (Cation del Tolima, 1700 m, A. H. Fassl) with a bluish-black upper surface and reduced, more bluish marking and a somewhat darker under surface, and pasibula from West Colombia (Rio Aguaca Valley, 2000 m, A. H. Fassl, and Cauca Valley) with a greenish black upper surface and broader greenish markings, being more coherent on the forewings. The female of pasibula, one of the most remarkable discoveries of Mr. A. H. Fassl, differs entirely from the male in the marking of the upper surface, resembling much rather the male of falcata in a conspicuous way. On the under surface it is considerably lighter than the male, reddish grey with the same markings as the male. — The males are very common at their habitat, the females, however, just as rare. — The egg is, according to Fassl, but slightly larger than the egg of Papilio machaon, globular, greenish yellow and glossy.
