= Otto Garlepp and Gustav Garlepp =

Otto Garlepp (20 August 1864, Cörmigk – 25 November 1959, Köthen), was a German naturalist and along with his brother Gustav Garlepp (24 July 1862 – 25 February 1907) were professional natural history specimen collectors who worked through the firm of Otto Staudinger and Otto Bang-Haas of Dresden.

== Life and work ==
The Garlepp brothers were born to Lebracht (1832–1911) and Sophie Garlepp née Pölysius in Cörmigk. Otto Garlepp and Gustav Garlepp are honoured in the butterfly name Papilio garleppi, the bird name Compsospiza garleppi the mammal name Garlepp's mouse, a subspecies of the Pampas cat and another of Darwin's rhea amongst many others. They were professional collectors in South America from 1883. At first Gustav worked alone, arriving in Brazil where there were many people of German descent ("Deutschbrasilianer") to collect insects for Dresden Zoological Museum. Gustav returned to Germany in 1892 following 4 years in Peru, a short trip to Germany and then an expedition to Bolivia. He returned to Bolivia in 1893 with his wife and Otto. He visited Germany for the last time in 1900 when he demonstrated 600 Neotropical bird species at a meeting of the Deutsche Ornithologen-Gesellschaft in Leipzig. Gustav settled in Paraguay in 1901 but was murdered in 1907 in Hohenau. Otto returned to Germany in 1911. He married Elise Ida Schulz in Germany and the couple returned to South America. Through Dr. Friedrich Ris in Switzerland, specimens of Lepidoptera are detailed, saying [translated]: "Mr. Fassl conveyed me collections that the very well-known tropical collector in lepidopterology circles Otto Garlepp had collected for him in Panama and Costarica in the same years 1912-13. In Panama are called as Lino and bugabita, after a written letter in the area of the Chiriqui volcano. In Costa Rica he collected in the areas the railway line in the valley of the Rio Reventazon and on the volcanoes Irazu and Turrialba. Both areas are well known through the Biologia Centrali Americana". Otto's collecting ceased in 1913 and settled in Köthen working for an insurance business.

The Garlepp zoological specimens are from Bolivia, Peru Colombia, Panama, Costa Rica Paraguay, Chile and Argentina. Many are holotypes.

4,000 Garlepp bird skins were purchased by Hans von Berlepsch who had trained Otto and who described the new species. The specimens are now in Naturmuseum Senckenberg and Naturhistorisches Museum Braunschweig. Further specimens are in Naumann Museum, Köthener Schloss (Website). Oology specimens are held by the Staatliches Museum für Tierkunde in Dresden (from the collection of Maximilian Kuschel), and by Naturhistorisches Museum in Vienna (from the collection of Josef Seilern (1883–1939)). Mammal specimens are in Museum für Naturkunde in Berlin. Butterflies went to the dealership Otto Staudinger. These are now widely dispersed as are insects of other orders.

== Other sources ==
- de.Wikipedia
- de.Wikipedia
- Bo Beolens, Michael Watkins and Michael Grayson The Eponym Dictionary of Mammals Johns Hopkins University Press ISBN 9780801893049
- Gebhardt, L. 1970: Die Ornithologen Mitteleuropas. Bd. 2. J. Orn. 111, Sh. 161 f.
- Zobodat
- Inventory of major European bird collections
