= Memphis aulica =

Scientific classification
- Kingdom: Animalia
- Phylum: Arthropoda
- Class: Insecta
- Order: Lepidoptera
- Family: Nymphalidae
- Tribe: Anaeini
- Genus: Memphis
- Species: M. aulica

Binomial name
- Memphis aulica (Röber, 1916)

Species of butterfly

Memphis aulica is a species of leafwing found in South America (Costa Rica and Panama).

Memphis aulica is a butterfly with forewings with a humped costal edge, a concave outer edge, a hooked inner angle and a concave inner edge. Each hindwing may or may not have a tail. The upper side is metallic blue or metallic blue-green with the forewings barred by a broad navy blue almost black stripe. The reverse side is brown with metallic reflections and simulates a dead leaf. It is closely similar to Memphis anassa (see that species for differences).
