= Argyrogrammana leptographia =

Scientific classification
- Kingdom: Animalia
- Phylum: Arthropoda
- Class: Insecta
- Order: Lepidoptera
- Family: Riodinidae
- Genus: Argyrogrammana
- Species: A. leptographia

Binomial name
- Argyrogrammana leptographia (Stichel, 1911)

Species of butterfly

Argyrogrammana leptographia described by Hans Stichel is a butterfly of the family Riodinidae. It is found in Costa Rica, Colombia and Ecuador.

== Description ==
The male is very bright sky-blue of a sapphire-lustre, with a broader orange filling in the border and a blackishly dotted instead of striped under surface; taken by Fassl near Muzo in Colombia, images
