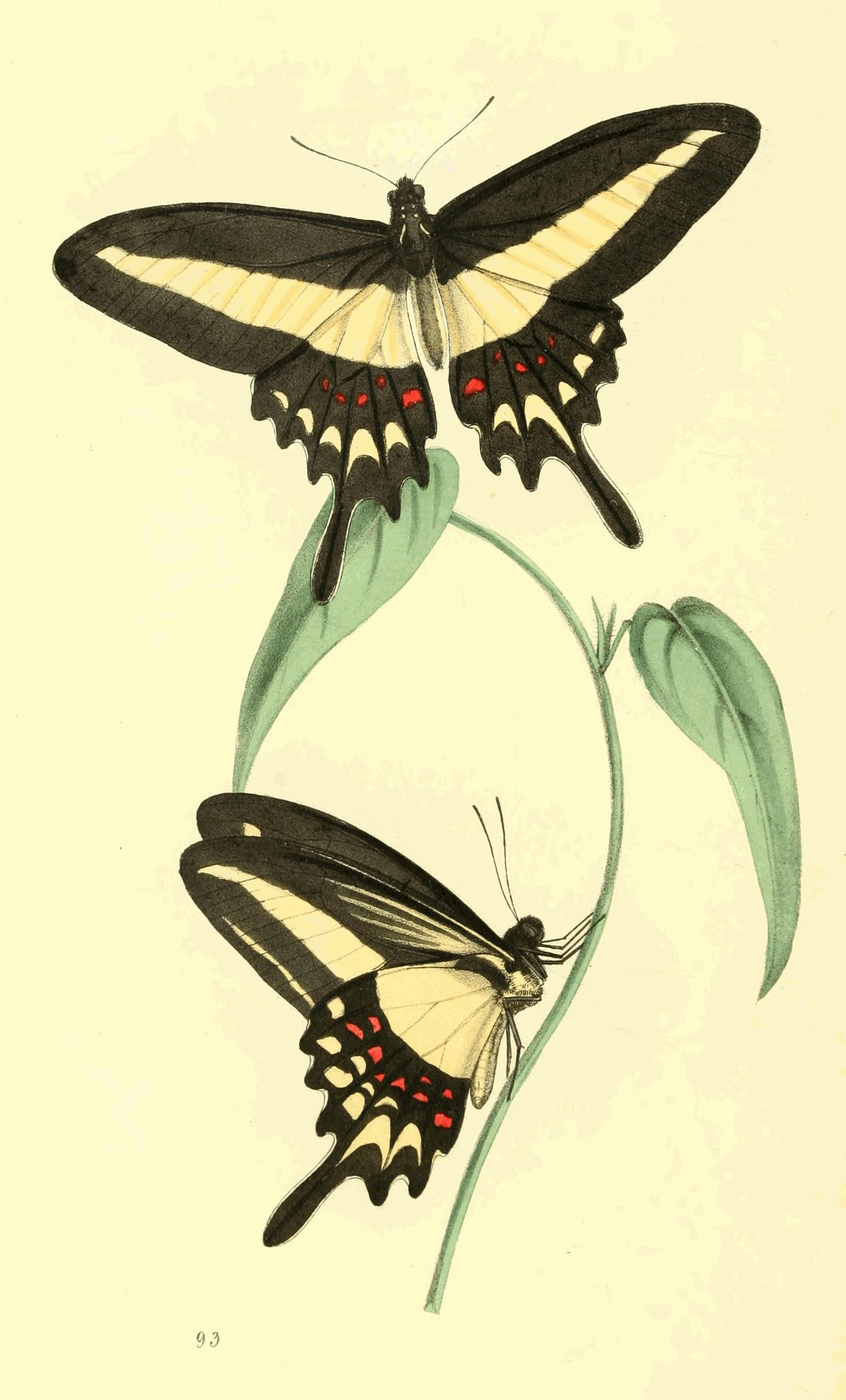

Scientific classification
- Kingdom: Animalia
- Phylum: Arthropoda
- Clade: Pancrustacea
- Class: Insecta
- Order: Lepidoptera
- Family: Papilionidae
- Genus: Papilio
- Species: P. hectorides

Binomial name
- Papilio hectorides Esper, 1794

Synonyms
- Papilio argentus Martyn, 1797; Papilio torquatinus Esper, 1799; Papilio pandrosus Godart, 1819; Papilio lysithous Godart, 1819; Menelaides chirodamas Hübner, [1825]; Papilio mezentius Doubleday, 1844; Papilio torquatinus ab. melania Oberthür, 1879; Papilio hectorides f. catamelas Rothschild & Jordan, 1906; Papilio hectorides agordus Fruhstorfer, 1915; Papilio hectorides lysirte Fruhstorfer, 1915

= Papilio hectorides =

Species of butterfly

Papilio hectorides is a species of Neotropical swallowtail butterfly from the genus Papilio that is found in Argentina, Paraguay, Uruguay and Brazil.

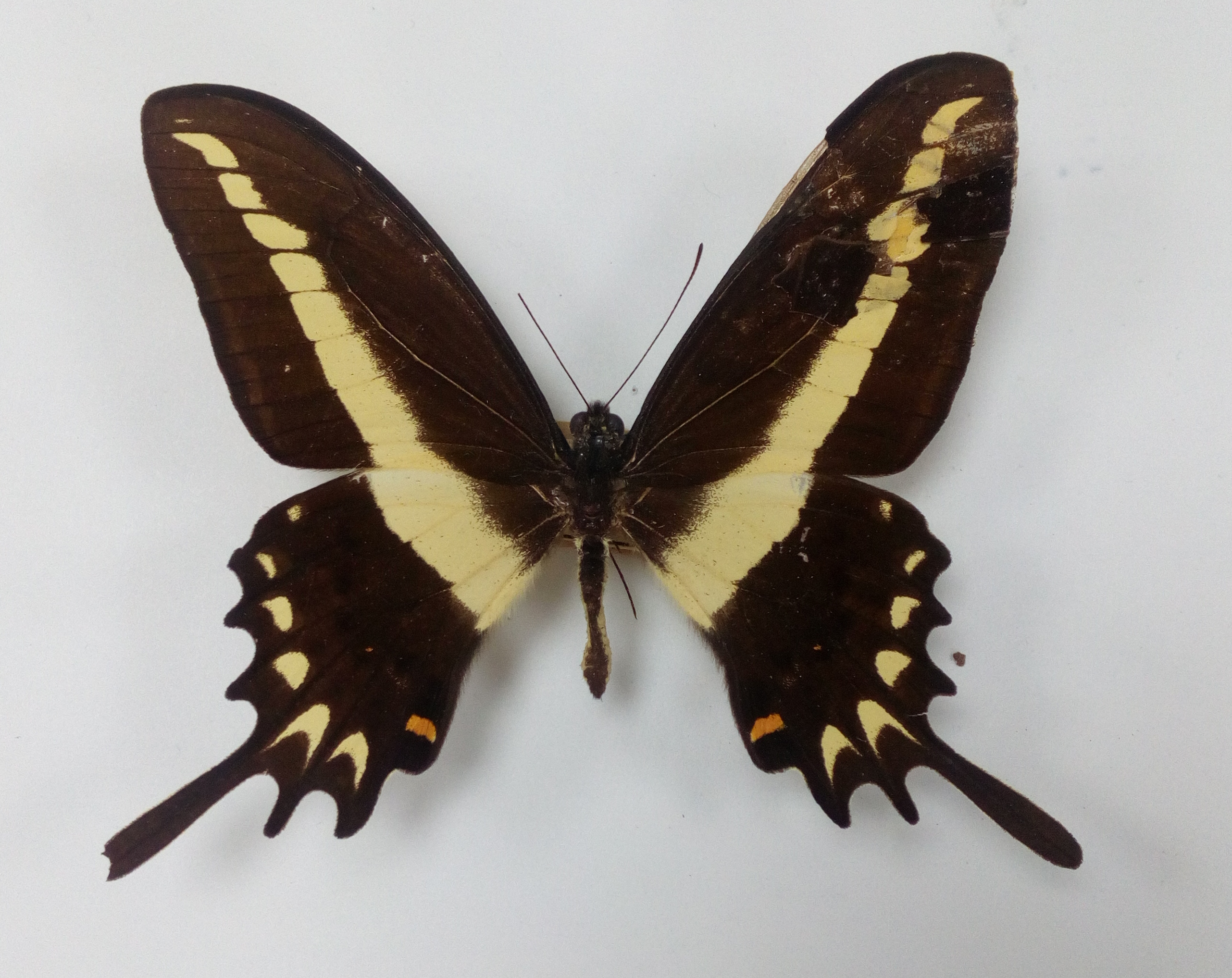

== Description in Seitz ==
P. hectorides Esp. (= torquatinus Esp., pandrosus Godt., chirodamas Hon.) (11a). In the male the band is still narrower than in lamarchei. Hindwing with red spots on the disc. In the female the band is absent or is white: on the forewing it is curved anteriorly towards the costa and on the hindwing does not extend to the abdominal margin; the submarginal spots of the hindwing are red and narrow. The female occurs in three principal forms: female-f. hectorides Esp. (= mecentius Doubl., argentus Gray) (11a) has a white band on both wings: in female f. catamelas R.& J. the band is developed on the hindwing, but on the forewing merely indicated; in female-f. melania Oberth. it is slightly indicated on both wings or entirely absent. These forms occur together. — Larva on Citrus and Piperaceae, resting gregariously on the upperside of leaves. The butterfly is common. It is a swift flier, which is found especially at the edges of woods and in the neighbourhood of thickets. Brazil and Paraguay.

== Status ==
It is common and not threatened.

== Biology ==
Larvae feed on Piperaceae.

== Taxonomy ==
Papilio hectorides is a member of the species group torquatus
