= Leafwing =

Leafwing may refer to:

- Charaxinae, a subfamily of butterflies commonly known as the leafwings
- Doleschallia bisaltide, a butterfly commonly known as the leafwing (in Australia) or autumnleaf (elsewhere)
- Zaretis itys, a butterfly commonly known as the leaf wing
