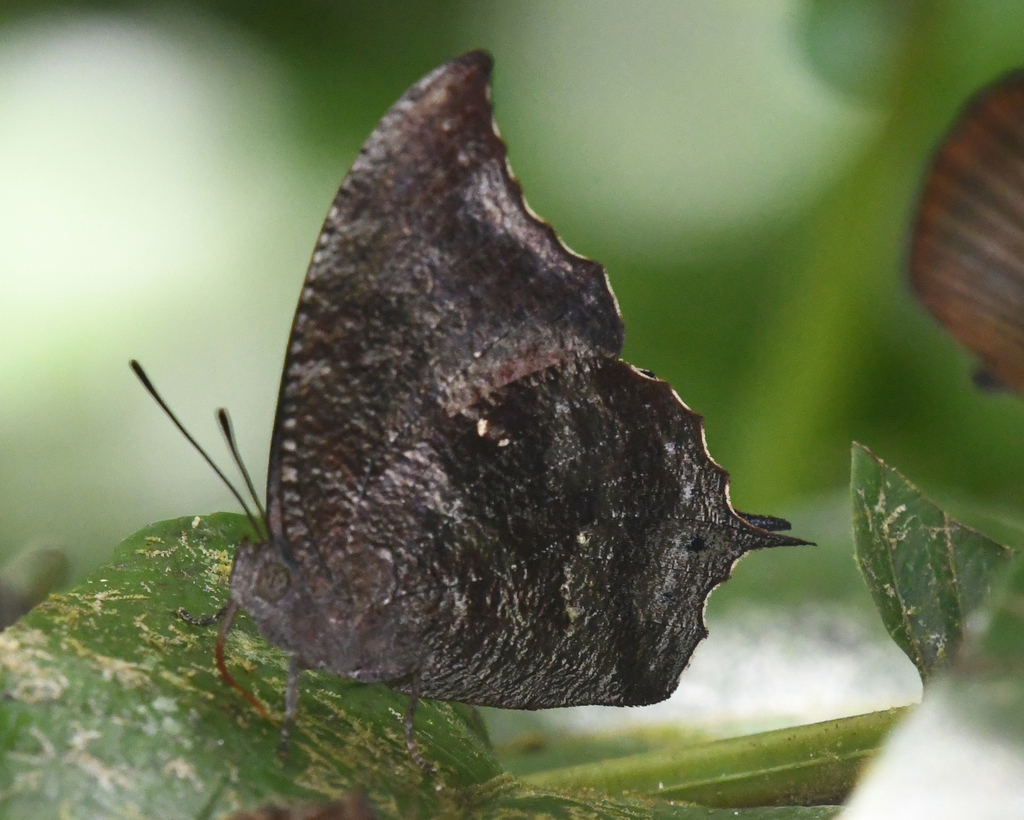

Scientific classification
- Kingdom: Animalia
- Phylum: Arthropoda
- Clade: Pancrustacea
- Class: Insecta
- Order: Lepidoptera
- Family: Nymphalidae
- Tribe: Anaeini
- Genus: Memphis
- Species: M. arginussa

Binomial name
- Memphis arginussa (Geyer, 1832)

= Memphis arginussa =

Species of butterfly

Memphis arginussa is a species of leafwing found in South America.

== Subspecies ==
- Memphis arginussa arginussa present in Brazil.
- Memphis arginussa eubaena (Boisduval, 1870) present in Mexico, Guatemala, and Panama.
- Memphis arginussa onophis (C. & R. Felder, 1861)

== Description ==
Memphis arginussa is a butterfly with forewings with a humped costal edge, concave outer edge, concave inner edge and hindwings with a tail. The upper part is dark blue to brown, with a lighter basal part, blue or blue-green, and a submarginal line of light dots. The underside is light brown and simulates a dead leaf.

- arginussa Hbn. greatly resembles onophis above, the white submarginal dots of the hindwings are also beneath very prominent. — onophides Stgr. from the Chiriqui has only 4 blue submarginal spots of the forewings. — concolor we denominate the South Brazilian form (Santa Catharina, Sao Paulo) in which on the upper surface all the wings are hardly differently coloured on the basal area, as on the outer part of the wings, whereas typical arginussa exhibit a bright blue reflection at the base.
- A. eubaena more pointed forewings, being more sinuated at the distal margin; the ground-colouring is, compared with onophis, more brownish than black and the fore- wings seem always to exhibit only 4 blue submarginal spots. The under surface is lighter than in onophis, but scarcely different in the scheme of markings.
- onophis Fldr. (118 e)The female has a more compact shape, paler colours and a larger yellowish spot at the costal margin of the hindwings. Beneath the species is similarly decorated with dark and silky bands as ‘’pithyusa ‘’(118 f), but the dark inner half is distally more irregularly defined and projects in thick obtuse teeth behind the cellule of the forewing.
