= Memphis pseudiphis =

Scientific classification
- Kingdom: Animalia
- Phylum: Arthropoda
- Class: Insecta
- Order: Lepidoptera
- Family: Nymphalidae
- Tribe: Anaeini
- Genus: Memphis
- Species: M. pseudiphis

Binomial name
- Memphis pseudiphis (Staudinger, 1887)

Species of butterfly

Memphis pseudiphis is a species of leafwing found in South America. It is endemic to Colombia.

== Description ==
Memphis pseudiphis is a butterfly with forewings with a humped costal edge, pointed apex, concave outer edge near the apex, hook-like inner angle, concave inner edge and hind wings each with a tail.The upper part is more or less dark blue with a lighter blue basal part.The reverse is shiny ochre and mimics a dead leaf. Seitz It is a large butterfly with long tails and a very much falciformly protracted inner angle of the forewings, the apical part of which exhibits bright blue spots being, however, not continued along the distal margin. Beneath the light small scales are arranged to a narrow marginal band and an oblique line cutting off the part of the inner angle.

== Taxonomy ==
Memphis pseudiphis is considered by some to be a subspecies of Memphis beatrix, Memphis beatrix pseudiphis. It has also been regarded as a form of Memphis moruus
