= Kuschel =

Kuschel is a surname. Notable people with the surname include:

- Guillermo Kuschel (1918–2017), Chile-born entomologist deceased in New Zealand
- Maximilian Kuschel (1851–1909), German ornithologist and oologist
