= Memphis anassa =

Scientific classification
- Kingdom: Animalia
- Phylum: Arthropoda
- Clade: Pancrustacea
- Class: Insecta
- Order: Lepidoptera
- Family: Nymphalidae
- Tribe: Anaeini
- Genus: Memphis
- Species: M. anassa

Binomial name
- Memphis anassa (Felder, C. & Felder, R., 1862)

Species of butterfly

Memphis anassa is a species of leafwing found in South America (Colombia, Ecuador, Brazil, and Peru).

Memphis annassa is a butterfly with a wingspan of 55 mm to 60 mm, with forewings with a pointed apex, a concave outer edge near the apex, a hooked inner angle and a very concave inner edge. The upper side is almost black with a metallic blue border, submarginal on the forewings, marginal on the hindwings. The reverse side is beige with silver and simulates a dead leaf. aulica subsp. nov. [Rober] [now species Memphis aulica (Röber, 1916) Costa Rica, Panama] from Chiriqui is smaller, has broader and more coherent blue marking on the forewings; the margin of the hindwings is more greenish and proximally more sharply defined. The under surface is darker without any rust-brown marking at the inner angle, it is more profusely scaled in whitish and the brown bands on the hindwings are absent.
