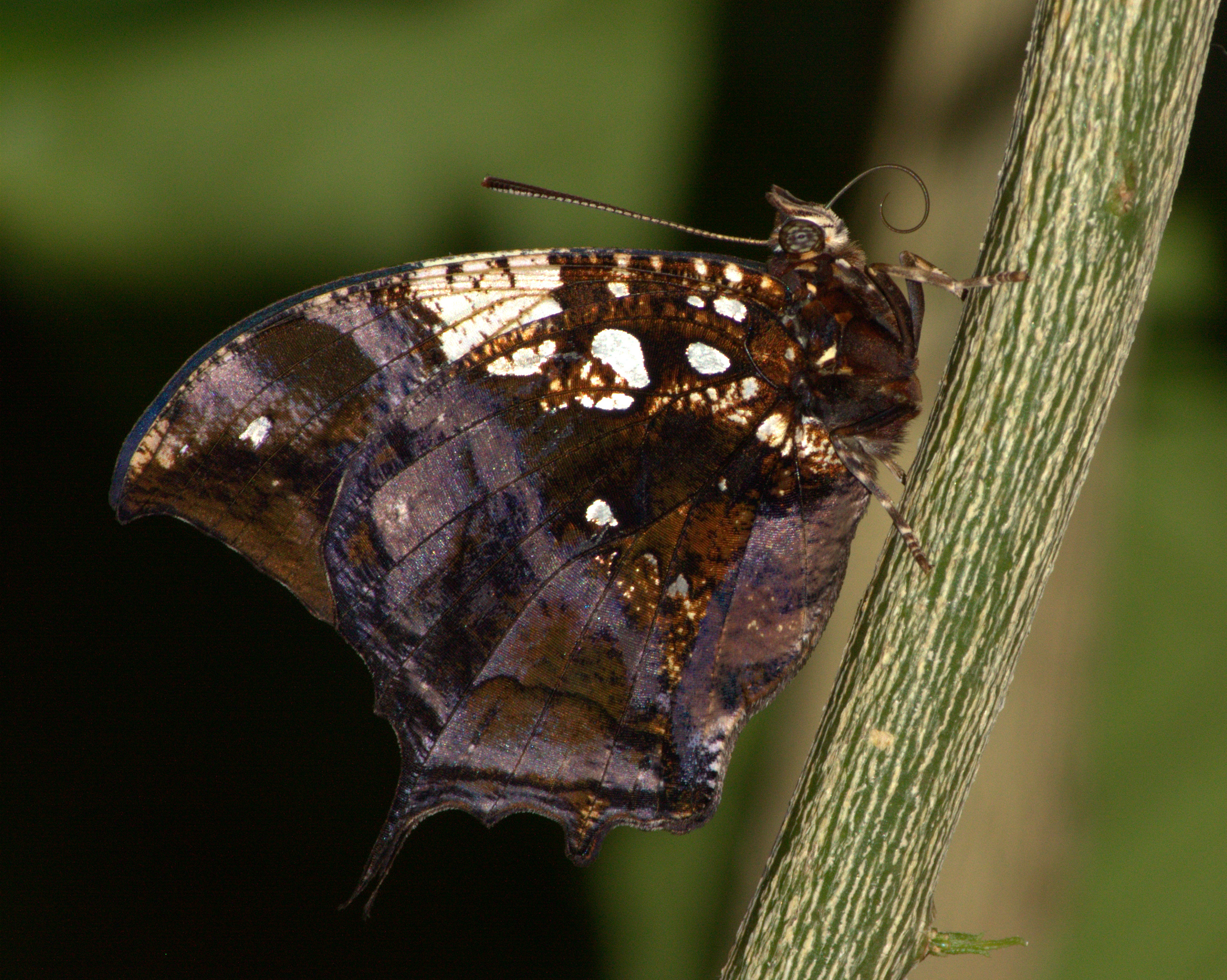
- Ventral view of Hypna clytemnestra

Scientific classification
- Kingdom: Animalia
- Phylum: Arthropoda
- Clade: Pancrustacea
- Class: Insecta
- Order: Lepidoptera
- Family: Nymphalidae
- Tribe: Anaeini
- Genus: Hypna; Hübner, 1819
- Species: H. clytemnestra

Binomial name
- Hypna clytemnestra (Cramer, 1777)

Synonyms
- Genus; Hecalene Doubleday, 1844; Species; Papilio clytemnestra Cramer; Anaea clytemnestra; Hypna clytemnestra Godman & Salvin, 1884; Hypna clytaemnestra var. negra C. & R. Felder, 1862; Hypna globosa Butler, 1866; Hypna velox Butler, 1866; Hypna forbesi Godman & Salvin, [1884]; Hypna elongata Butler, 1866; Hecalene iphigenia Westwood, 1850

= Hypna =

Monotypic brush-footed butterfly genus

Hypna is a butterfly genus of the family Nymphalidae. It is monotypic, containing only Hypna clytemnestra, the jazzy leafwing, marbled leafwing or silver-studded leafwing.

== Description ==
Hypna clytemnestra is the largest member of the tribe Anaeini. This "leafwing butterfly" is quite uncommon. The uppersides of the forewings are black, with a few white spots on the margins and two large white transverse bands. The uppersides of the hindwings are mainly brown. The undersides mimic dead leaves, ranging from dark brown to whitish. Larvae feed on Croton floribundus (Euphorbiaceae), while adults feed on rotting fruits.

== Distribution ==
Hypna clytemnestra can be found from Mexico to the Amazon basin.

== Habitat ==
This butterfly can be found in the lowlands or the foothills, at an elevation of about 100–1,200 metres (330–3,940 ft) above sea level.

== Philately ==
This butterfly is on a Cuban stamp with a face value of ¢13.

== Subspecies ==
- H. c. clytemnestra (Nicaragua - Brazil, Suriname)
- H. c. negra C. & R. Felder, 1862 (Peru, Bolivia, Panama)
- H. c. forbesi Godman & Salvin, 1884 (Brazil: Pernambuco)
- H. c. huebneri Butler, 1866 (Brazil)
- H. c. rufescens Butler, 1866 (Venezuela, Colombia)
- H. c. mexicana Hall, 1917 (Mexico: Oaxaca)
- H. c. corymbaensis Talbot, 1928 (Brazil: Mato Grosso)
- H. c. iphigenia Herrich-Schäffer, 1862 (Cuba)

== Gallery ==
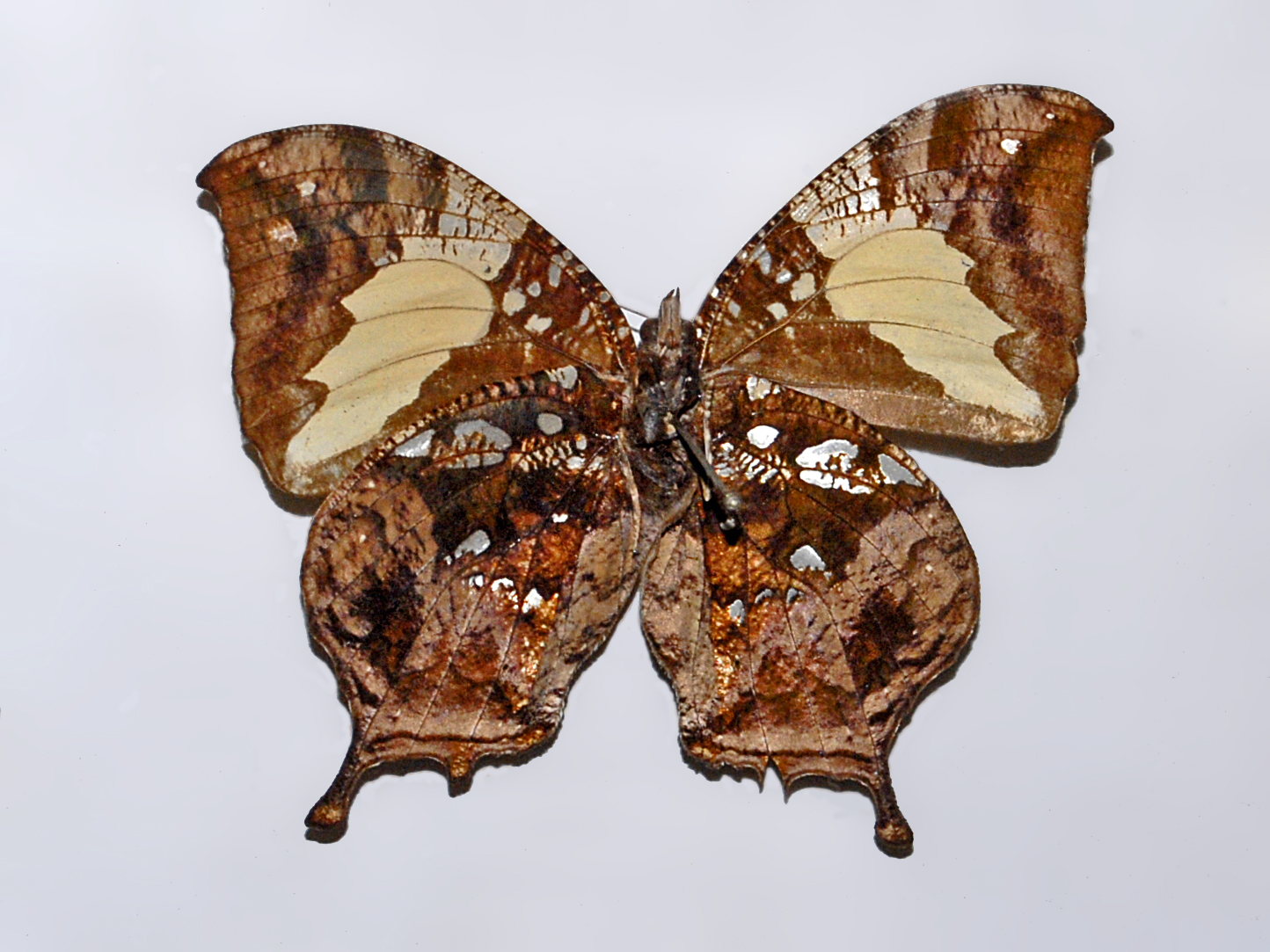
Specimen on display at the Museo Civico di Storia Naturale di Trieste

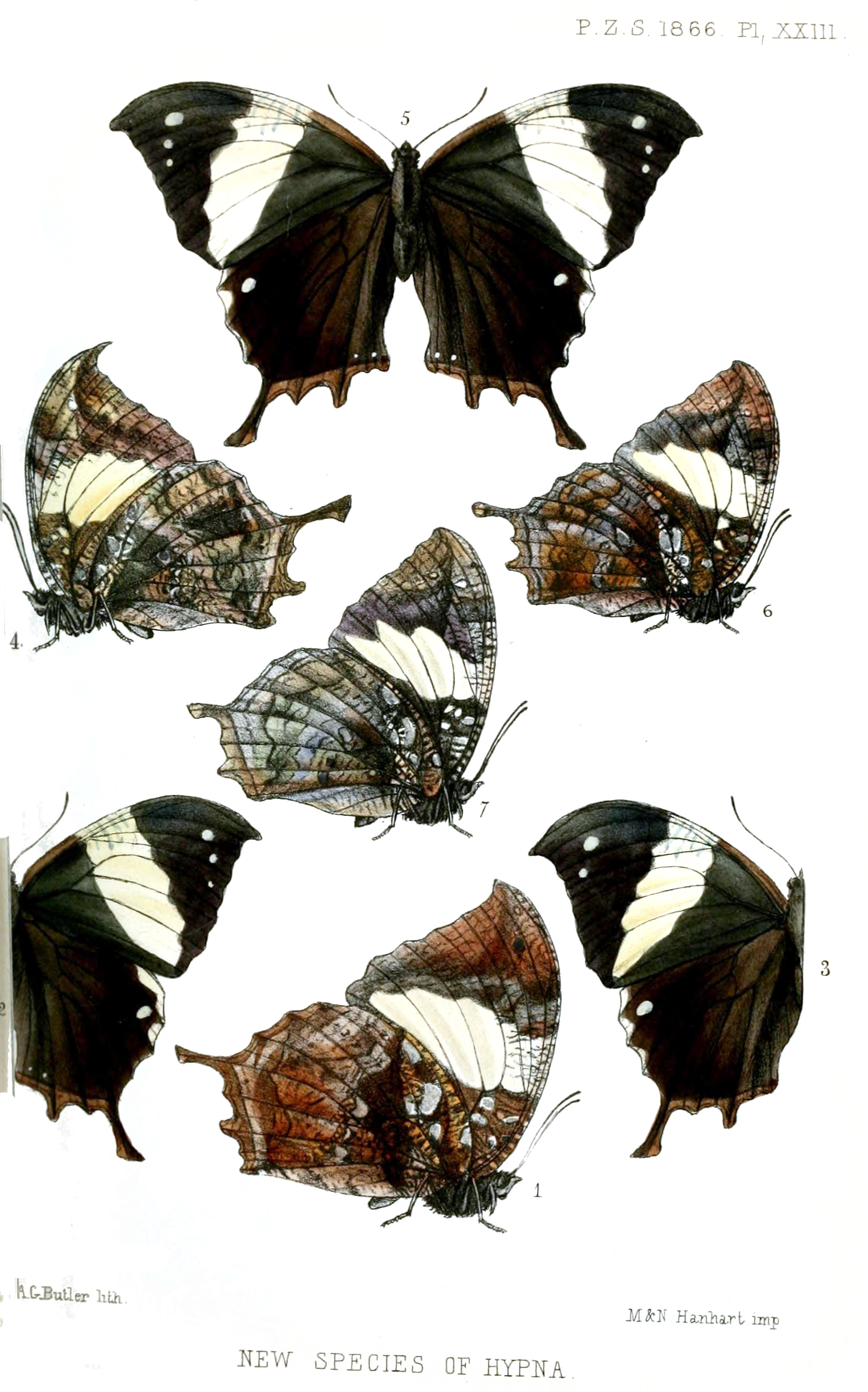
Subspecies and forms from Proceedings of the Zoological Society of London (vol. 1866, plate XXIII)

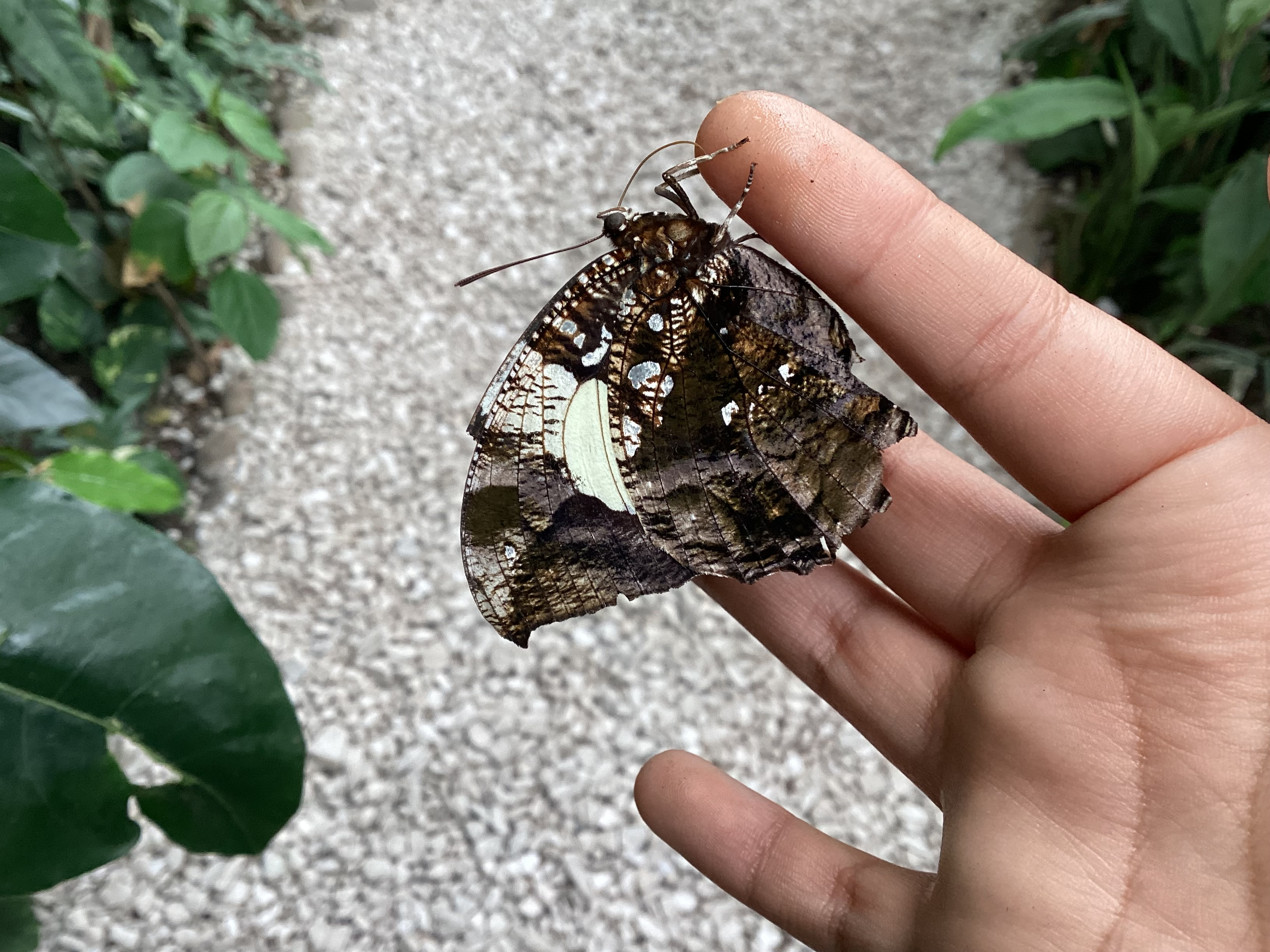
Feeding at a butterfly house
