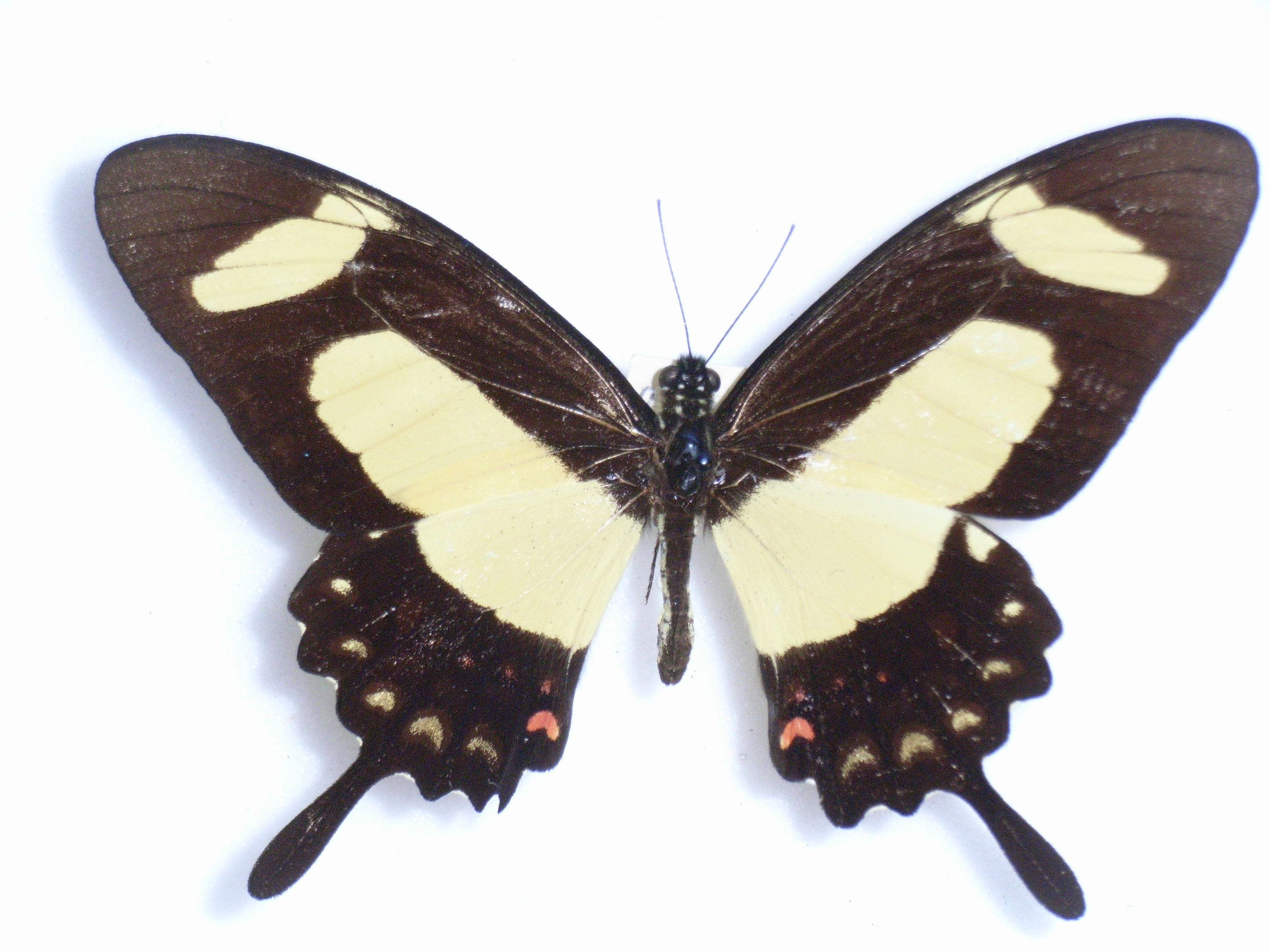

Scientific classification
- Kingdom: Animalia
- Phylum: Arthropoda
- Class: Insecta
- Order: Lepidoptera
- Family: Papilionidae
- Genus: Papilio
- Species: P. torquatus

Binomial name
- Papilio torquatus Cramer, 1777

Synonyms
- Heraclides torquatus; Troilildes torquatus; Princeps caudius Hübner, [1809]; Papilio patros Gray, [1853]; Papilio tolmides Godman & Salvin, [1890]; Papilio tolus Godman & Salvin, [1890]; Papilio trojanus Boisduval, 1836; Papilio orchamus Boisduval, 1836 (preocc. Cramer, 1777)

= Papilio torquatus =

Species of butterfly

Papilio torquatus, the torquatus swallowtail, is a swallowtail butterfly in the subfamily Papilioninae. It is found from northern Argentina to Mexico.

The wingspan is 75–80 millimetres (3.0–3.1 in).

== Description in Seitz ==
P. torquatus. male: the band of the forewing is interrupted between the 2. and 3. radial, rarely there is a yellow spot almost filling up the gap; on the under surface of the hindwing a row of red discal spots, of which the last is placed proximally to the last submarginal spot. The female very different from the male, resembling certain Aristolochia-Papilios which occur together with it; wings brown-black, with or without white patches on the forewing; hindwing above with two rows of red spots, the proximal row incomplete, some of the spots merged together in pairs into 2 or 3 large patches. The anal tergite of the male spatulate; the harpe broad, denticulate. Larva shiny, as if polished (which is also the case in all the allied species), mottled with light colour, with irregular pale patch before the middle; the colour of bird-droppings. The butterfly is found in forests and in their neighbourhood; the female is a true woodland species, like the Aristolochia-Papilios whose dress it wears, whilst the males disport themselves more in open, sunny localities. Mexico to Brazil, not known from the temperate part of South America (South Brazil, Argentina). — tolus Godin, & Salv.male: band of the forewing narrow, the anterior spot long, the 2. short. female: forewing without white discal spots; hindwing with 2 separated rows of red spots. Tail in both sexes long and spatulate. Mexico, apparently rare. — tolmides Godm. & Salv. male: band broader than in tolus, tail narrower, no spots, or only very small ones, before the upper angle of the cell of the forewing. female not known. Chiriqui and Sevilla Island; likewise rare in collections. — orchamus Boisd. male: the spots before the upper angle of the cell of the forewing small, the first long spot of the yellow band as long as the 2., or somewhat longer, the submarginal spots of the hindwing usually very distinct. female with a white spot placed across the cell of the forewing and another spot before the 1. median, as well as usually also a spot before the 3. radial and an indistinct spot behind the 1. median: 4—6 large red spots on the hindwing, cell with spot, tail short, non-spatulate. Colombia; North Venezuela. — leptalea R.& J. male: yellow band of the forewing narrower than the black marginal area, narrower than in all the other forms of this species; the spots before the apex of the cell small; the submarginal spots of the hindwing distinct, the apex of the cell on the under surface black as far as the base of the 1. median; tail spatulate. female similar to that of orchamus, the white spot between the 2. and 3. spot of the forewing and the cell-spot smaller. West Ecuador. — torquatus Cr. (= pelaus F.) (11b). male: the spots before the apex of the cell of the forewing mostly larger than in the other forms, the two subapical spots of the band broad, the 1. shorter than the 2., the band at least half as broad again as the black submarginal area; the submarginal spots of the hindwing usually strongly darkened by black scaling. The female very variable; the tail always slender, commonly short; 5 principal forms: female-f. theras R. & J., forewing with cell-spot, which however does not extend across the cell, and one or more spots on the disc; female-f. caudius Hbn. has no cell-spot, but several discal spots, of which the one placed between the 1. and 2. median is the largest; female-f. patros Gray (11b) has no white spots on the forewing, the patches on the hindwing are red; female-f. flavida Oberth. (= flava Haase) resembles patos, but the patches on the hindwing are yellow-white; female-f. cleolas R & J. has no spots on the forewing, but on its under surface a yellowish white submarginal band. These different forms of the female occur only partly together, the first 4 are known from the Upper Amazon, but the 5. form, which we have from Bolivia, may also be found there. East and South Venezuela, the Guianas, the Amazons and the eastern slopes of the Andes of Ecuador, Peru and Bolivia. — polybius Swains. (female = tros Hbn., trojanus Boisd.) (11b) inhabits Brazil, Matto Grosso and Paraguay. In the male the spots before the apex of the cell of the forewing are small and the submarginal spots on the underside rather large; on the hindwing beneath the cell is entirely or almost entirely yellow; the tail broad. The female occurs only in one form: forewing with spot in the cell and a large patch between the 1. and 2. median: tail spatulate, with rounded tip.

== Biology ==
Adults strongly resemble Papilio garleppi.

The larvae feed on the leaves of Citrus species. Full-grown larvae are mottled in dull tones of brown, greenish-yellow and whitish. It resembles a bird dropping.

== Subspecies ==
- P. t. torquatus (Venezuela, Guianas to Brazil (Amazonas), Ecuador, Peru, Bolivia)
- P. t. mazai Beutelspacher, 1977 (Mexico, El Salvador)
- P. t. tolmides Godman & Salvin, 1890 (Panama, Costa Rica)
- P. t. tolus Godman & Salvin, 1890 (Mexico, Guatemala)
- P. t. leptalea Rothschild & Jordan, 1906 (western Ecuador)
- P. t. polybius Swainson, 1823 (Brazil (Minas Gerais, Rio de Janeiro, Mato Grosso), Paraguay, Argentina)
- P. t. jeani (Brown & Lamas, 1994) (Colombia, western Venezuela)

== Taxonomy ==
Papilio torquatus is the nominotypical member of the species group torquatus The members are:

- Papilio garleppi Staudinger, 1892 l
- Papilio hectorides Esper, 1794
- Papilio himeros Hopffer, 1865
- Papilio lamarchei Staudinger, 1892
- Papilio torquatus Cramer, 1777
