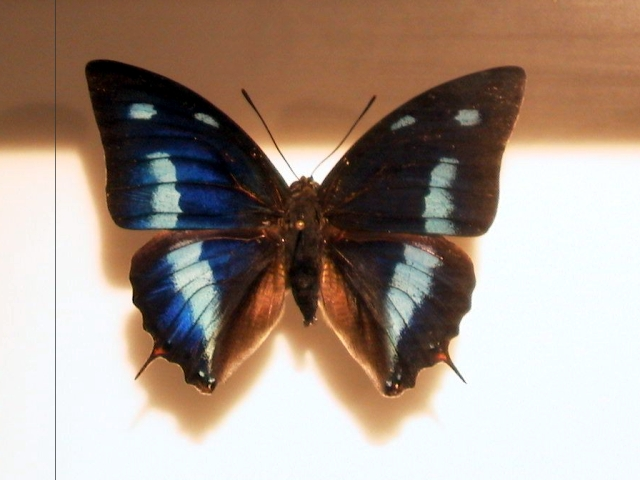
- Polygrapha cyanea

Scientific classification
- Kingdom: Animalia
- Phylum: Arthropoda
- Class: Insecta
- Order: Lepidoptera
- Family: Nymphalidae
- Tribe: Anaeini
- Genus: Polygrapha; Staudinger, [1887]

Synonyms
- Pseudocharaxes Salazar, 2001 (nom. nud.); Muyshondtia Salazar & Constantino, 2001; Pseudocharaxes Salazar & Constantino, 2001; Zikania Salazar & Constantino, 2001 (preocc.)

= Polygrapha =

Genus of butterflies

Polygrapha is a Neotropical nymphalid butterfly genus in the subfamily Charaxinae.

There are four species in the genus.

== Species ==
- Polygrapha cyanea (Godman & Salvin, 1868)
- Polygrapha suprema (Schaus, 1920)
- Polygrapha tyrianthina (Salvin & Godman, 1868)
- Polygrapha xenocrates (Westwood, 1850)
