= Argyrogrammana trochilia =

Scientific classification
- Kingdom: Animalia
- Phylum: Arthropoda
- Class: Insecta
- Order: Lepidoptera
- Family: Riodinidae
- Genus: Argyrogrammana
- Species: A. trochilia

Binomial name
- Argyrogrammana trochilia (Westwood, 1851)

Species of butterfly

Argyrogrammana trochilia described by John Obadiah Westwood in 1851 is a butterfly of the family Riodinidae It is found in Colombia, Bolivia, Lower Amazon -Brazil and the Guianas.

== Description ==
The male is of a brilliant sky-blue with black transverse stripes and a dark distal margin being finely filled up by orange. The female has 5 yellow stripes on a dark ground and a metallic line often reduced to tiny spots before the border. Under surface of both sexes striped like a zebra. On the Lower Amazon the species is not very rare. images.
