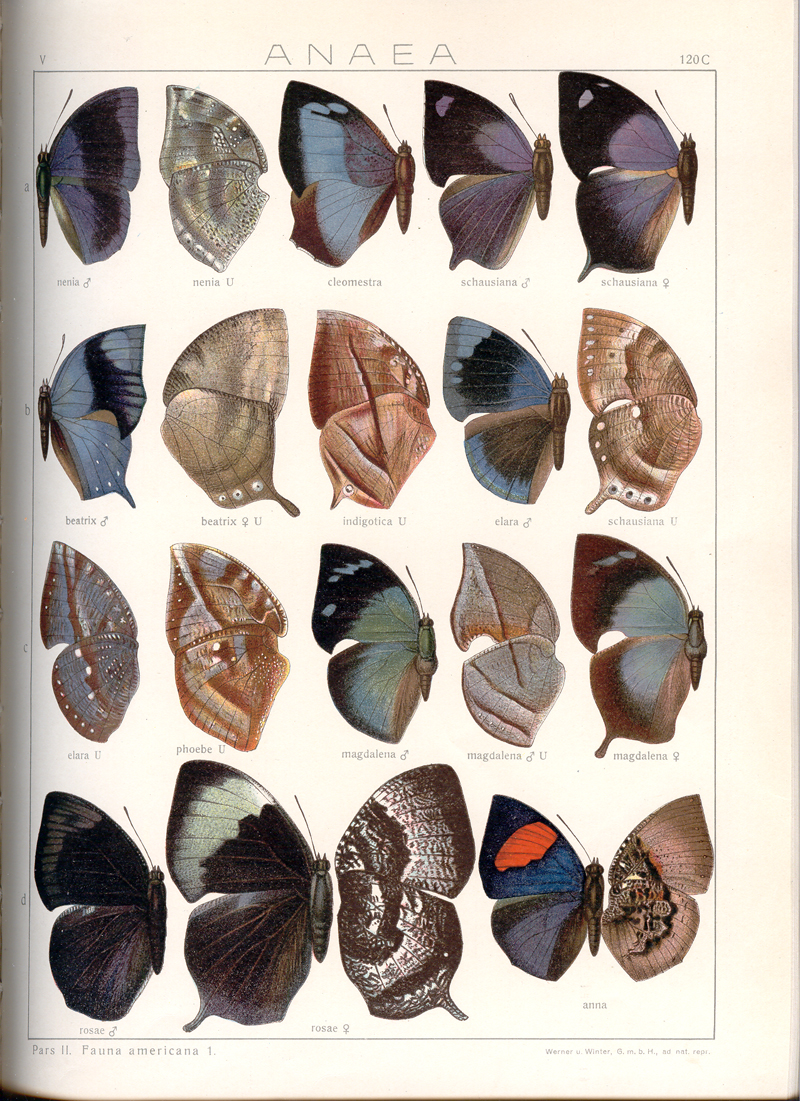

Scientific classification
- Kingdom: Animalia
- Phylum: Arthropoda
- Class: Insecta
- Order: Lepidoptera
- Family: Nymphalidae
- Genus: Memphis
- Species: M. beatrix

Binomial name
- Memphis beatrix ((H. Druce, 1874)

Synonyms
- Paphia beatrix Druce, 1874

= Memphis beatrix =

Species of butterfly

Memphis beatrix is a species of leafwing found in South America (Costa Rica, Panama, Colombia and Ecuador).

== Subspecies ==
- Memphis beatrix pseudiphis Staudinger, 1887[4]. Considered by some to be a species Memphis pseudiphis.

== Description ==
Memphis beatrix is a butterfly with a wingspan of about 50 mm, with forewings with a humped costal edge, angular apex, almost straight outer edge, hook-like inner angle and very concave inner edge. Each hindwing bears a tail. The upper part is navy blue, almost black, with a more or less important metallic blue basal part and decorated on the forewings with a few blue spots near the apex. The underside is dark grey with metallic reflections and simulates a dead leaf.Seitz- A. beatrix Druce (120 C b) from Chiriqui is an imposing species. The female is beneath much greyer than the male. Seems not to be rare..

== Biology ==
The host plants of its caterpillar are Piper.
