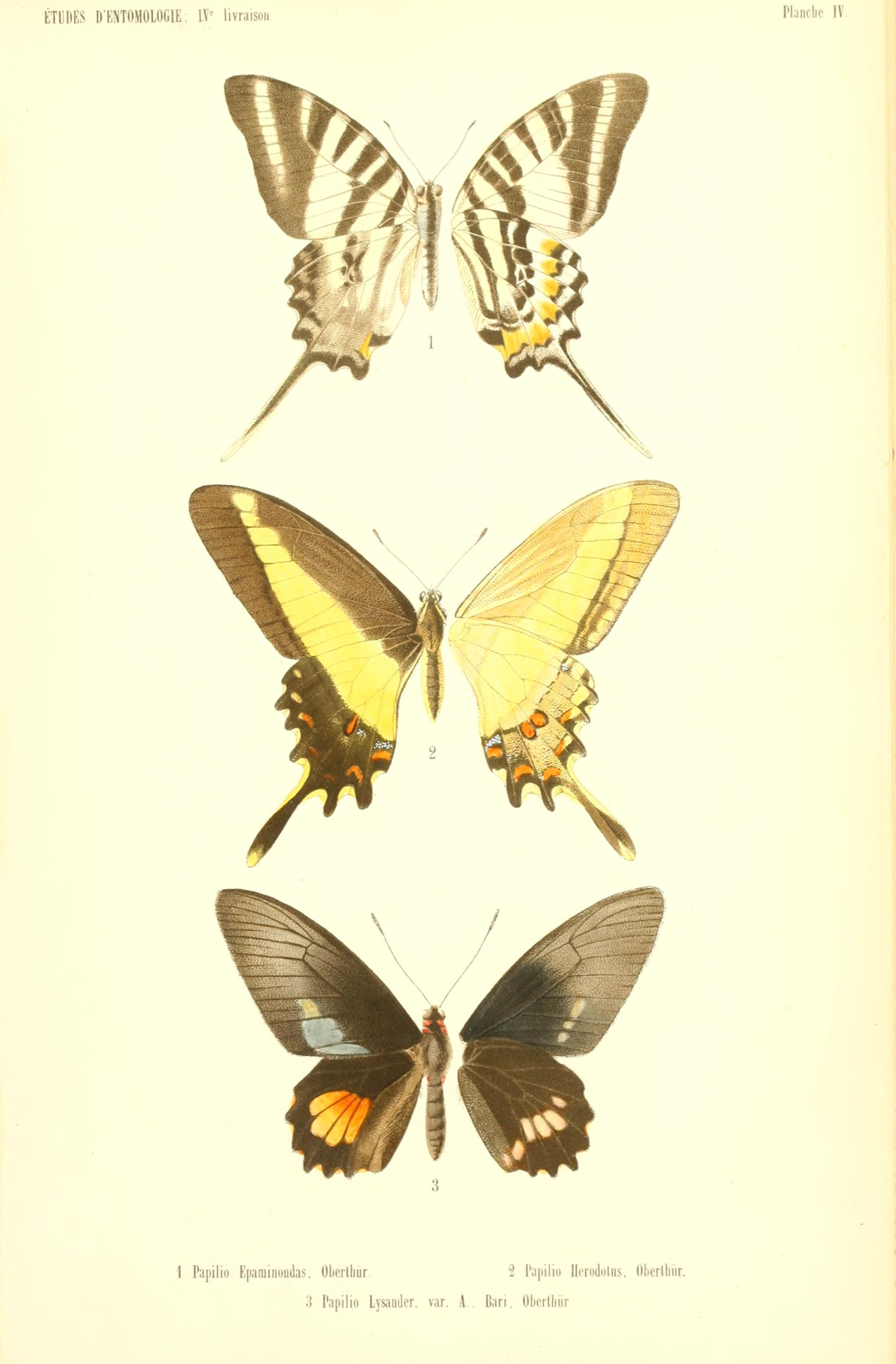

Conservation status
- Vulnerable (IUCN 3.1)

Scientific classification
- Kingdom: Animalia
- Phylum: Arthropoda
- Clade: Pancrustacea
- Class: Insecta
- Order: Lepidoptera
- Family: Papilionidae
- Genus: Papilio
- Species: P. himeros

Binomial name
- Papilio himeros Hopffer, 1866

= Papilio himeros =

Species of butterfly

Papilio himeros is a species of butterfly in the family Papilionidae. It is found in Argentina and Brazil.

== Description ==
Both wings with yellow band (which is broader in the male than in the female); tail with yellow apical spot; submarginal spots of the hindwing in the male yellow, in the female red except the 2 anterior ones.

== Similar species ==
Papilio lamarchei

== Biogeographic realm ==
Neotropical realm

== Taxonomy ==
Papilio himeros is a member of the species group torquatus
