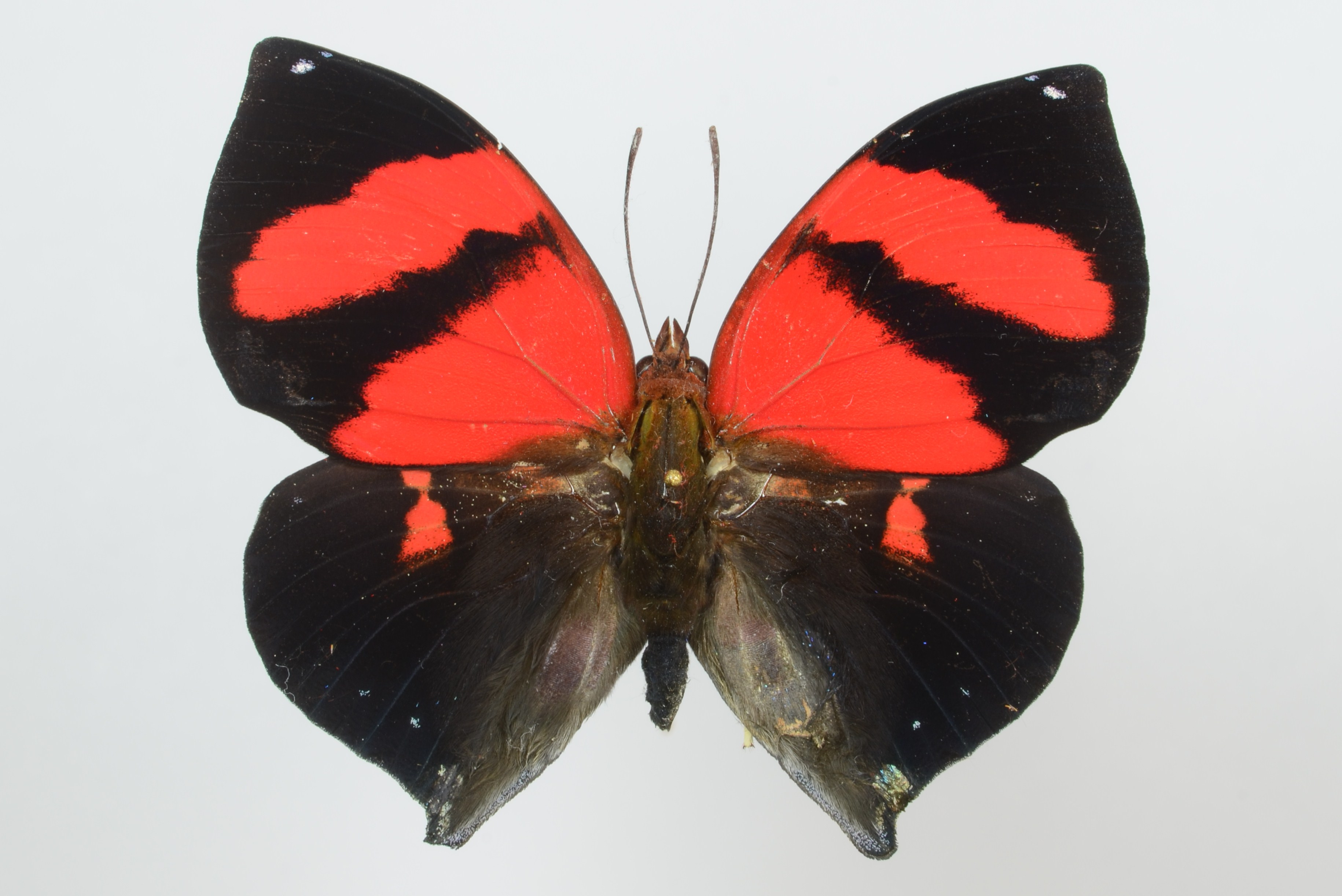

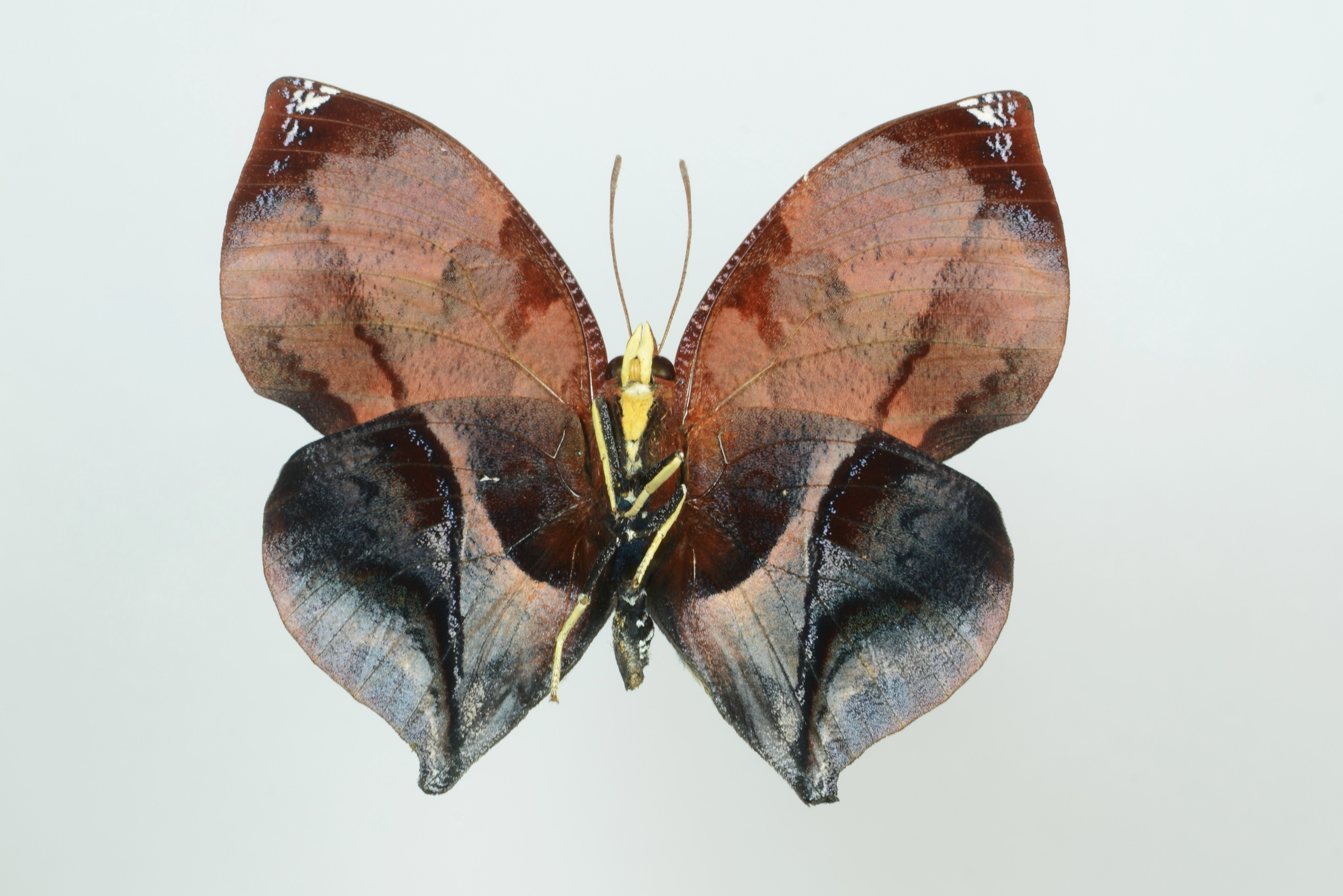

Scientific classification
- Kingdom: Animalia
- Phylum: Arthropoda
- Clade: Pancrustacea
- Class: Insecta
- Order: Lepidoptera
- Family: Nymphalidae
- Genus: Siderone
- Species: S. galanthis

Binomial name
- Siderone galanthis (Cramer, [1775])

Synonyms
- Papilio galanthis Cramer, [1775]; Papilio marthesia Cramer, [1777]; Siderone marthesia f. leonora Krüger, 1933 (preocc. Bargmann, 1928); Siderone marthesia f. sincera Krüger, 1933; Siderone marthesia f. salmonea Biedermann, 1933; Siderone marthesia f. cancellariae Hall, 1935; Siderone thebais C. & R. Felder, 1862; Siderone nemesis var. confluens Staudinger, 1887; Siderone nemesis f. leonora Bargmann, 1928; Siderone thebais f. exacta Bargmann, 1929

= Siderone galanthis =

Species of butterfly

Siderone galanthis, the scarlet leafwing or red-striped leafwing, is a species of butterfly of the family Nymphalidae. It is found from Mexico to southern Brazil. The habitat consists deciduous and evergreen forests at altitudes up to 900 meters.

Adults have been recorded imbibing mineralised moisture from the ground.

The larvae have been recorded feeding on Casearia sylvestris and Zuelania quidonia.

== Subspecies ==
  - Siderone galanthis galanthis Cramer, 1775 (Guyana, French Guiana ,Surinam, SE Venezuela, Northern & Central Brazil, Eastern Bolivia, Trinidad)
- Siderone galanthis thebais C. & R. Felder, 1862 (Venezuela, Colombia, Panama , Costa Rica , Pacific coastal areas of Nicaragua, Honduras , El Salvador and Guatemala)
- Siderone galanthis canande Dottax & Pierre, 2013 (Western Ecuador)
- Siderone galanthis nemesis Illiger, 1801 (Grande Antilles including Hispaniola, Puerto Rica and Cuba)
- Siderone galanthis mexicana Dottax & Pierre, 2009 (Southern Mexico, Eastern Central America to Northern Costa Rica)
- Siderone galanthis catarina Dottax & Pierre, 2009 (Southern Brazil)
- Siderone galanthis pernambuco Dottax & Pierre, 2013 (Pernambuco state Brazil)
- Siderone galanthis ssp (Peru) one or more as yet undescribed ssp.
