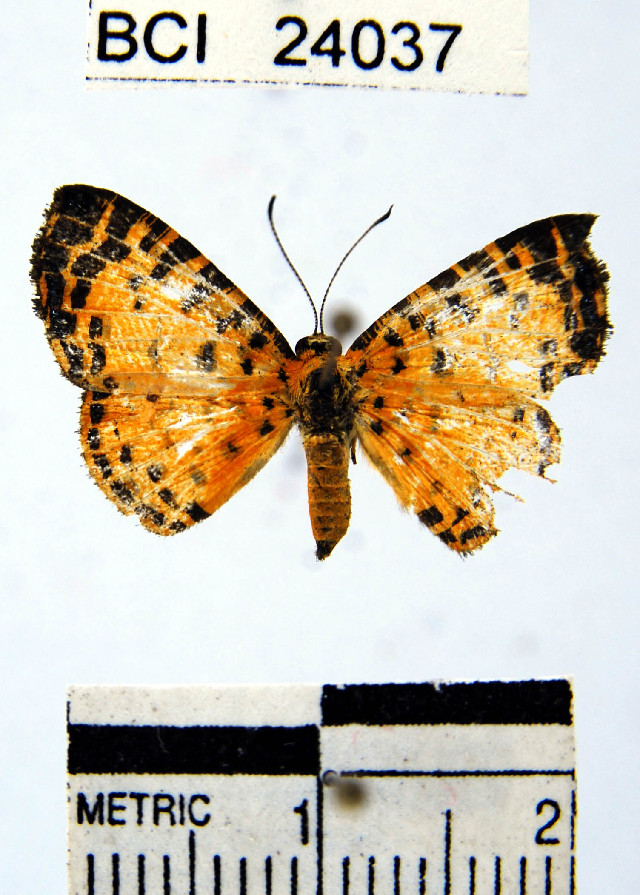
- Argyrogrammana crocea

Scientific classification
- Kingdom: Animalia
- Phylum: Arthropoda
- Class: Insecta
- Order: Lepidoptera
- Family: Riodinidae
- Subfamily: Riodininae
- Genus: Argyrogrammana; Strand, 1932

Species
- See text

Synonyms
- Argyrogramma Stichel, 1910 (preocc. Hübner, [1823])

= Argyrogrammana =

Genus of butterflies

Argyrogrammana is a butterfly genus in the family Riodinidae. They are resident in the Neotropics.

== Species list ==
- Argyrogrammana alstonii (Smart, 1979) French Guiana, Trinidad and Tobago
- Argyrogrammana amalfreda (Staudinger, [1887]) Peru
- Argyrogrammana aparamilla Hall & Willmott, 1995 Ecuador
- Argyrogrammana barine (Staudinger, [1887]) Costa Rica, Colombia, Ecuador
- Argyrogrammana bonita Hall & Willmott, 1995 Ecuador
- Argyrogrammana caelestina Hall & Willmott, 1995 Colombia, Ecuador, Peru
- Argyrogrammana caesarion Lathy, 1958 Brazil
- Argyrogrammana celata Hall & Willmott, 1995 Ecuador
- Argyrogrammana chicomendesi Gallard, 1995 French Guiana
- Argyrogrammana crocea (Godman & Salvin, 1878) Costa Rica, Nicaragua, Panama, Ecuador
- Argyrogrammana denisi Gallard, 1995 French Guiana
- Argyrogrammana glaucopis (Bates, 1868) French Guiana, Ecuador, Peru, Brazil
- Argyrogrammana johannismarci Brévignon, 1995 French Guiana, Ecuador, Peru
- Argyrogrammana leptographia (Stichel, 1911) Costa Rica, Ecuador, Colombia
- Argyrogrammana natalita Hall & Willmott, 1995 Ecuador
- Argyrogrammana nurtia (Stichel, 1911) French Guiana, Bolivia, Peru
- Argyrogrammana occidentalis (Godman & Salvin, [1886]) French Guiana, Colombia, Trinidad and Tobago
- Argyrogrammana pacsa Hall & Willmott, 1998 Ecuador
- Argyrogrammana pastaza Hall & Willmott, 1996 Ecuador, Peru
- Argyrogrammana physis (Stichel, 1911) French Guiana, Colombia, Ecuador, Brazil, Peru
- Argyrogrammana placibilis (Stichel, 1910) French Guiana, Brazil, Peru
- Argyrogrammana praestigiosa (Stichel, 1929) French Guiana
- Argyrogrammana pulchra (Talbot, 1929) Colombia
- Argyrogrammana rameli (Stichle, 1930) French Guiana, Ecuador, Peru, Brazil
- Argyrogrammana saphirina (Staudinger, [1887]) Panama, Ecuador
- Argyrogrammana sebastiani Brévignon, 1995 French Guiana
- Argyrogrammana stilbe (Godart, [1824]) Mexico, French Guiana, Colombia, Bolivia, Ecuador, Brazil
- Argyrogrammana sticheli (Talbot, 1929) French Guiana
- Argyrogrammana subota (Hewitson, 1877) Ecuador
- Argyrogrammana sublimis Brévignon & Gallard, 1995 French Guiana, Costa Rica, Ecuador, Brazil
- Argyrogrammana talboti Brévignon & Gallard, 1998 French Guiana, Brazil
- Argyrogrammana trochilia (Westwood, 1851) French Guiana, Colombia, Bolivia
- Argyrogrammana venilia (Bates, 1868) French Guiana, Ecuador, Brazil
