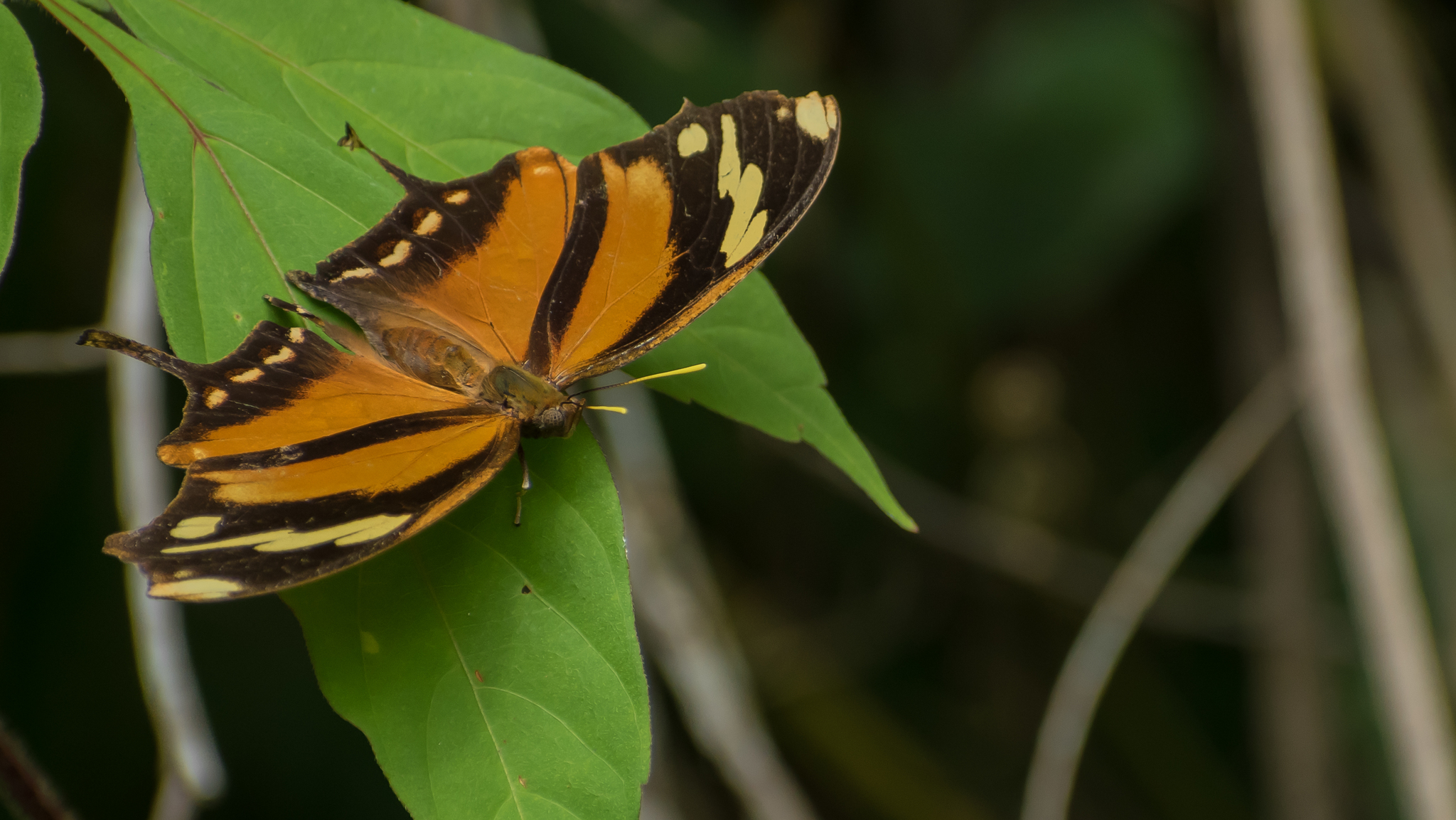
- Consul fabius

Scientific classification
- Domain: Eukaryota
- Kingdom: Animalia
- Phylum: Arthropoda
- Class: Insecta
- Order: Lepidoptera
- Family: Nymphalidae
- Tribe: Anaeini
- Genus: Consul; Cramer, 1776

= Consul (butterfly) =

Genus of butterflies

Consul, described by Pieter Cramer in 1776, is a South American nymphalid butterfly genus in the subfamily Charaxinae.

== Species ==
There are four species in the genus. All are Neotropical.

Species	Common name	Image
Consul electra (Westwood, 1850)	pearly leafwing	
Consul excellens (Bates, 1864)	black-veined leafwing	
Consul fabius (Cramer, 1776)	tiger leafwing	
Consul panariste (Hewitson, 1856)	tricoloured leafwing	

Consul fabius is the most common and well known. It occurs from Mexico to Bolivia in deciduous forest, rainforest, and cloud forest, at elevations between sea level and about 1200 m. The larvae feed on several species of Piperaceae. It is part of a mimicry ring and also mimics dead leaves.
