= Papilio garleppi =

Conservation status
- Least Concern (IUCN 3.1)

Scientific classification
- Kingdom: Animalia
- Phylum: Arthropoda
- Clade: Pancrustacea
- Class: Insecta
- Order: Lepidoptera
- Family: Papilionidae
- Genus: Papilio
- Species: P. garleppi

Binomial name
- Papilio garleppi Staudinger, 1892

Species of butterfly

Papilio garleppi is a species of Neotropical butterfly in the family Papilionidae first described by Otto Staudinger in 1892. It is found in Bolivia, Brazil, French Guiana, Guyana, Peru, and Suriname.

== Description ==
The male is similar to Papilio torquatus, but the yellow band is broader and the marginal tooth of the first median of the hindwing is longer. There are two or three small spots composed of yellowish and bluish scales placed before the red anal spot of the hindwing. On the underside the posterior discal spot is placed at the second median is very small and bluish. The anal tergite is long and slender; harpe produced into a long point and furnished with a long pointed process at the ventral margin.

== Taxonomy ==
Papilio garleppi is a member of the species group torquatus.

== Etymology ==
The species is named for the professional collector Gustav Garlepp.
