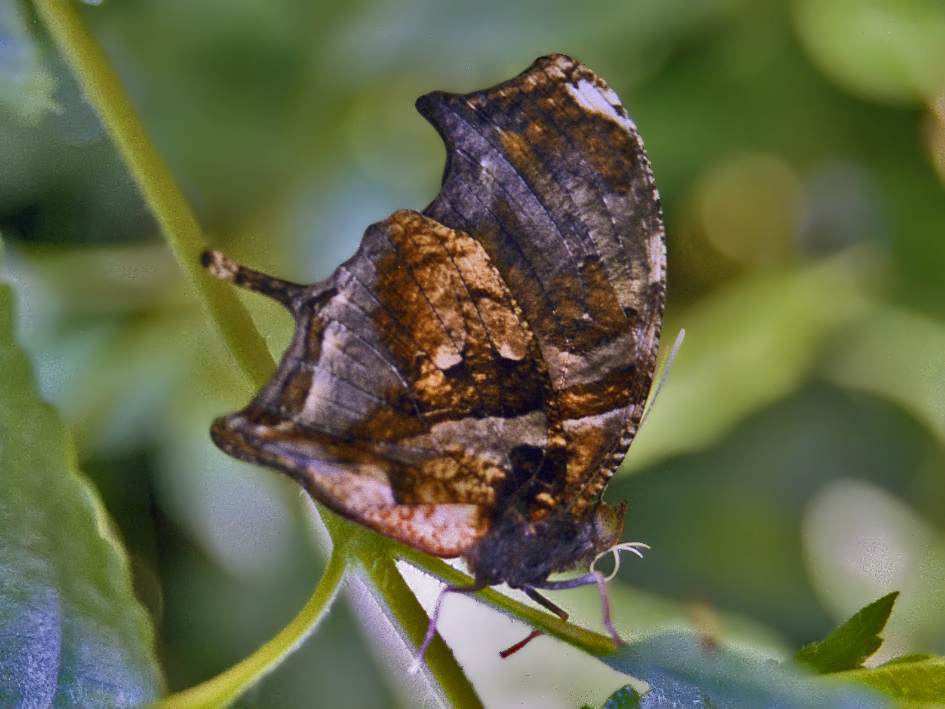
- Ventral view

Scientific classification
- Kingdom: Animalia
- Phylum: Arthropoda
- Clade: Pancrustacea
- Class: Insecta
- Order: Lepidoptera
- Family: Nymphalidae
- Genus: Consul
- Species: C. fabius

Binomial name
- Consul fabius (Cramer, 1776)

Synonyms
- Numerous, see text

= Consul fabius =

Tiger leafwing

Species of butterfly

Consul fabius, the tiger leafwing, is the most common and well known species of the genus Consul of subfamily Charaxinae in the brush-footed butterfly family (Nymphalidae). It is found all over the Neotropics.

== Description ==
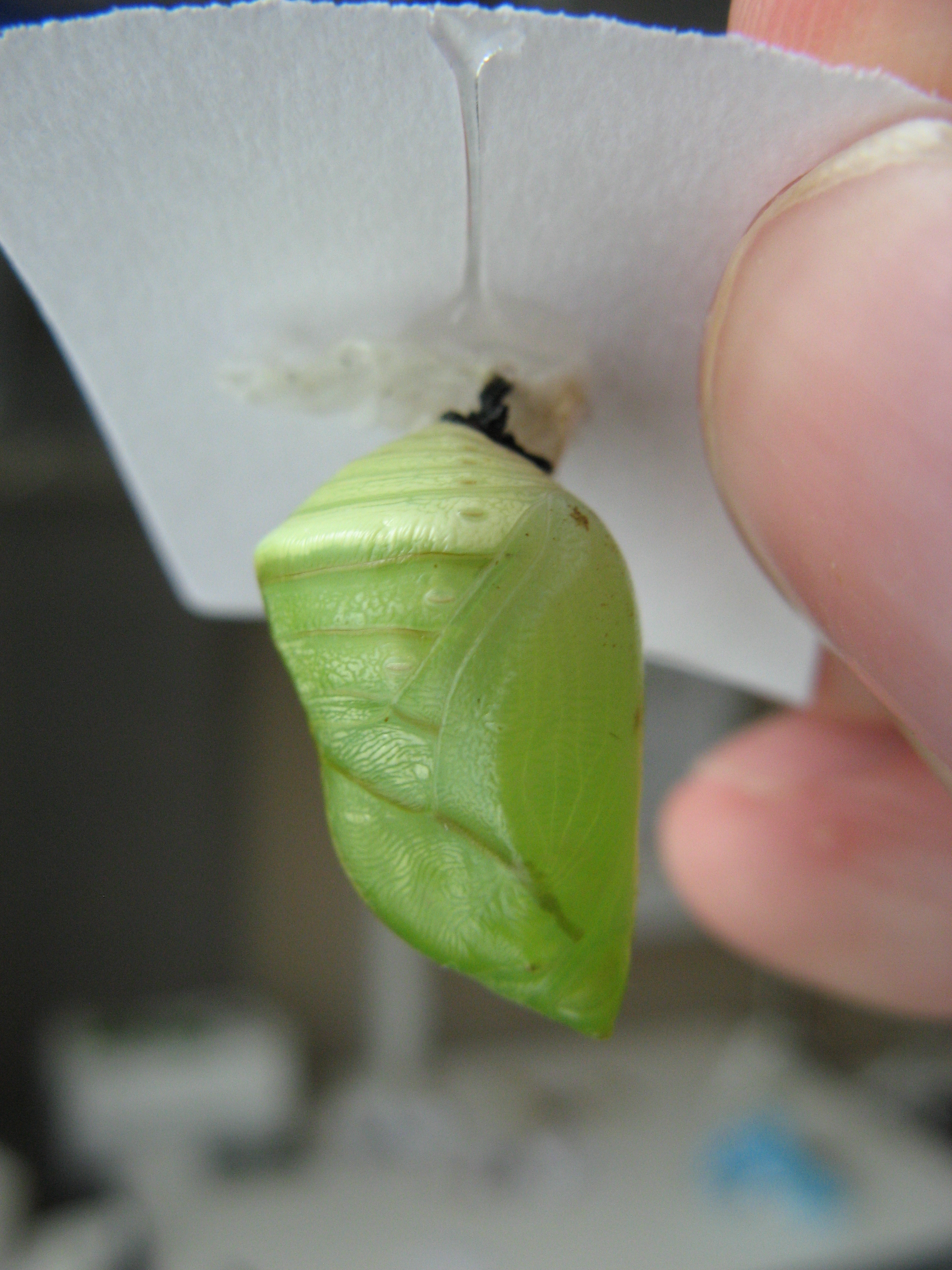
Chrysalis

The length of the forewings reaches about 30–40 millimetres (1.2–1.6 in). The uppersides of the wings have a bright orange and black pattern, with two yellow bands across the angular forewings. The hindwings are tailed. This butterfly is part of a mimicry ring, as a matter of fact the cryptic undersides of the wings mimic a dead leaf. The eggs are laid on the leaves of various species of Piperaceae (Piper tuberculatum, Piper auritum, Piper umbellatum, etc.), of which the caterpillars feed. The caterpillars are dark green with reddish spots along the back, while the chrysalis are pale green.

== Distribution ==
Consul fabius occurs from Mexico to the Amazon basin (Bolivia, Brazil, Colombia, Ecuador, Mexico, Panama, Peru, Suriname, Trinidad, Venezuela).

== Habitat ==
This species is present in deciduous forest, rainforest, and cloud forest. It usually prefers the forest canopy, the banks of rivers and the forest edges, at elevations between sea level and about 1200 m.

== Subspecies ==
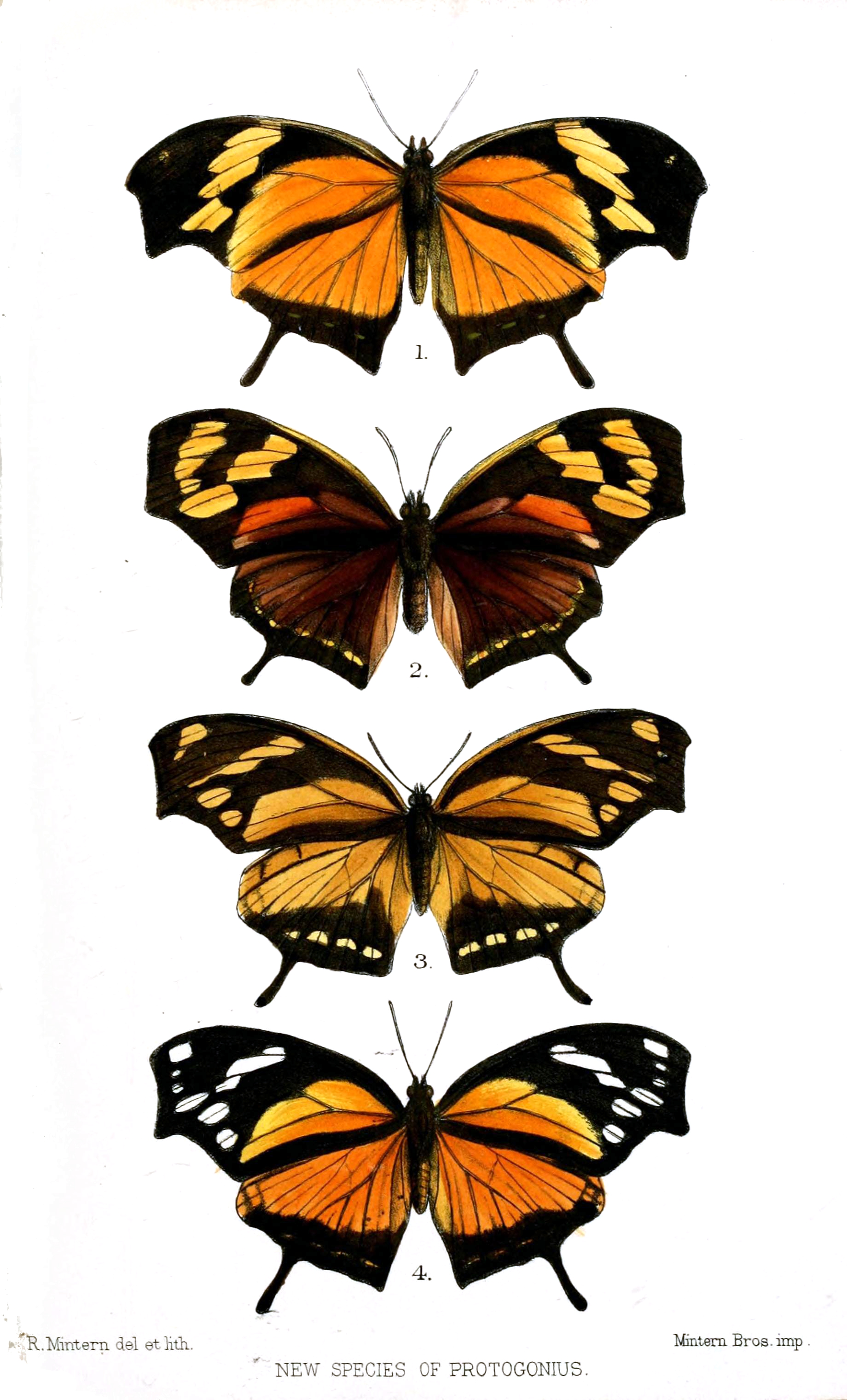
Top to bottom: subspecies C. f. quadridentatus, C. f. castaneus, C. f. ochraceus and C. f. albinotatus

- C. f. fabius (Suriname)
- C. f. cecrops (Doubleday, [1849]) (Mexico, Panama to Bolivia)
- C. f. albinotatus (Butler, 1874) (Colombia)
- C. f. bogotanus (Butler, 1874) (Columbia, Venezuela)
- C. f. castaneus (Butler, 1874) (Brazil: Amazonas)
- C. f. drurii (Butler, 1874) (Brazil)
- C. f. divisus (Butler, 1874) (Peru)
- C. f. ochraceus (Butler, 1874) (Trinidad)
- C. f. quadridentatus (Butler, 1874) (Bolivia)
- C. f. fulvus (Butler, 1875) (Peru)
- C. f. diffusus (Butler, 1875) (Ecuador)
- C. f. semifulvus (Butler, 1875) (Ecuador)
- C. f. fassli (Röber, 1916) (western Colombia, Ecuador)
- C. f. superba (Niepelt, 1923) (Colombia)

== Synonyms ==
- Papilio fabius Cramer, [1775]
- Consul hippona
- Anaea fabius
- Protogonius quadridentatus = C. f. quadridentatus (Butler, 1874)
- Protogonius castaneus = C. f. castaneus (Butler, 1874)
- Protogonius ochraceus = C. f. ochraceus (Butler, 1874)
- Protogonius albinotatus = C. f. albinotatus (Butler, 1874)
- Protogonius cecrops Doubleday, [1849]
- Protogonius hippona chiricanus Röber, 1916
- Protogonius tithoreides Butler, 1874
- Protogonius lilops Butler, 1874
- Protogonius holocrates Hahnel, 1890
- Protogonius hippona var. immaculatus Staudinger, 1887
- Protogonius hippona var. peruvianus Staudinger, 1887
- Protogonius hippona trinitatis Röber, 1916
- Protogonius butleri Staudinger, 1886
- Protogonius aequatorialis Butler, 1875
- Protogonius diffusus ab. ecuadorensis Strand, 1921
