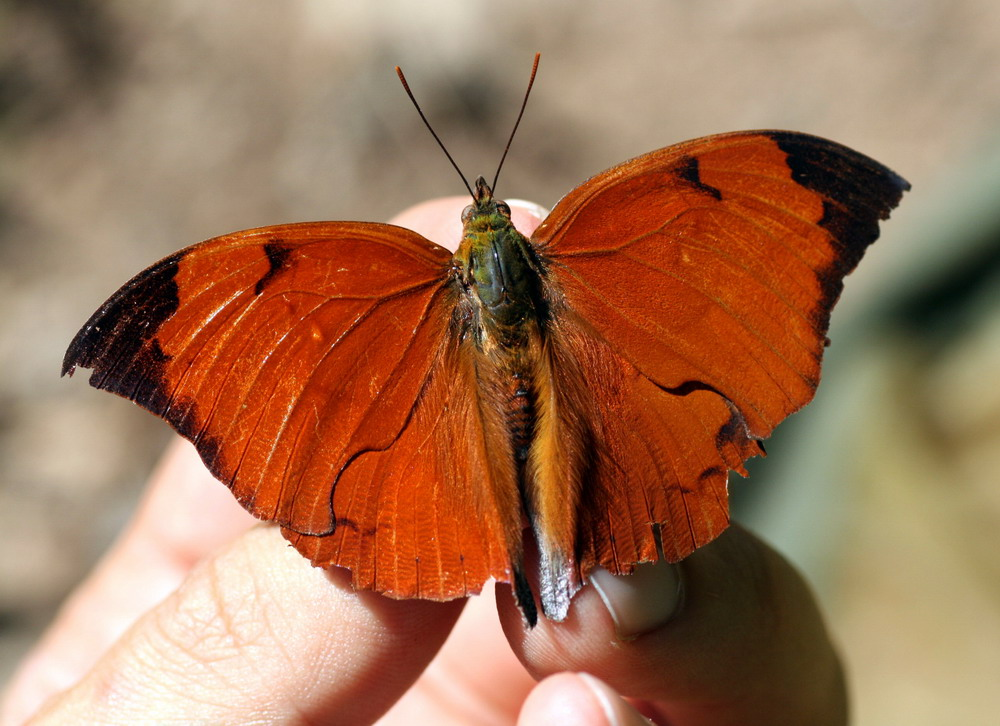

Scientific classification
- Kingdom: Animalia
- Phylum: Arthropoda
- Clade: Pancrustacea
- Class: Insecta
- Order: Lepidoptera
- Family: Nymphalidae
- Tribe: Anaeini
- Genus: Zaretis; Hübner, [1819]

Synonyms
- Zaretes Reuter, 1897

= Zaretis =

Genus of insects

Zaretis is a Neotropical nymphalid butterfly genus in the subfamily Charaxinae.

== Species ==
Listed alphabetically:

- Zaretis callidryas (R. Felder, 1869) – ghost leafwing
- Zaretis crawfordhilli Dias, 2018
- Zaretis elianahenrichae Dias, 2018
- Zaretis ellops (Ménétriés, 1855) – holey leafwing
- Zaretis hurin Dias, 2018
- Zaretis isidora (Cramer, [1779]) – Cramer's leafwing
- Zaretis itylus (Westwood, 1850)
- Zaretis itys (Cramer, [1777]) – skeletonized leafwing
- Zaretis mirandahenrichae Dias, 2018
- Zaretis pythagoras Willmott & J. Hall, 2004
- Zaretis strigosus (Gmelin, [1790])
- Zaretis syene (Hewitson, 1856)
