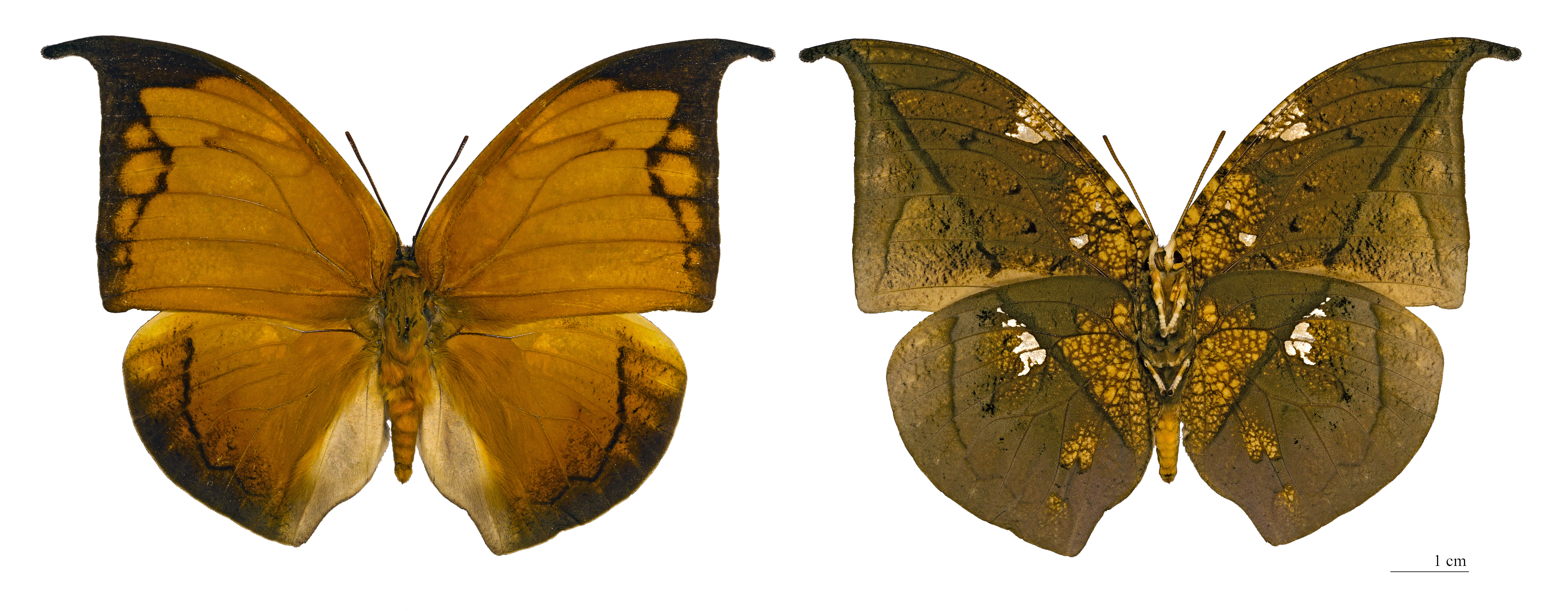

Scientific classification
- Domain: Eukaryota
- Kingdom: Animalia
- Phylum: Arthropoda
- Class: Insecta
- Order: Lepidoptera
- Family: Nymphalidae
- Tribe: Anaeini
- Genus: Coenophlebia; C. & R. Felder, 1862
- Species: C. archidona

Binomial name
- Coenophlebia archidona (Hewitson, 1860)

Synonyms
- Siderone archidona Hewitson, 1860; Anaea archidona; Coenophlebia archidona magnifica Fruhstofer, 1915

= Coenophlebia =

Genus of butterflies

Coenophlebia is a genus of neotropical charaxine butterflies in the family Nymphalidae, native to Colombia, Peru, Brazil, Bolivia and Ecuador. It is a monotypic genus. The single species is Coenophlebia archidona. The habitat consists of rainforests and transitional cloudforests at altitudes between 100 and 800 metres (300 and 2,600 ft).

The wingspan is about 90 mm. Adults mimic fallen leaves. They are attracted to decaying matter.
