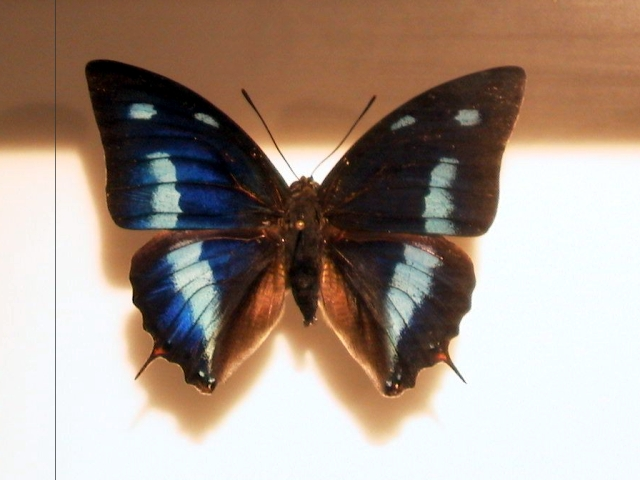

Scientific classification
- Domain: Eukaryota
- Kingdom: Animalia
- Phylum: Arthropoda
- Class: Insecta
- Order: Lepidoptera
- Family: Nymphalidae
- Genus: Polygrapha
- Species: P. cyanea

Binomial name
- Polygrapha cyanea (Godman & Salvin, 1868)

Synonyms
- Paphia cyanea Godman & Salvin, 1868; Anaea cyanea

= Polygrapha cyanea =

Species of butterfly

Polygrapha cyanea is a butterfly of the family Nymphalidae. It is known from Peru, Ecuador and Colombia.

== Subspecies ==
- Polygrapha cyanea cyanea (Ecuador)
- Polygrapha cyanea silvaorum Constantino & Salazar, 1998 (Colombia)
