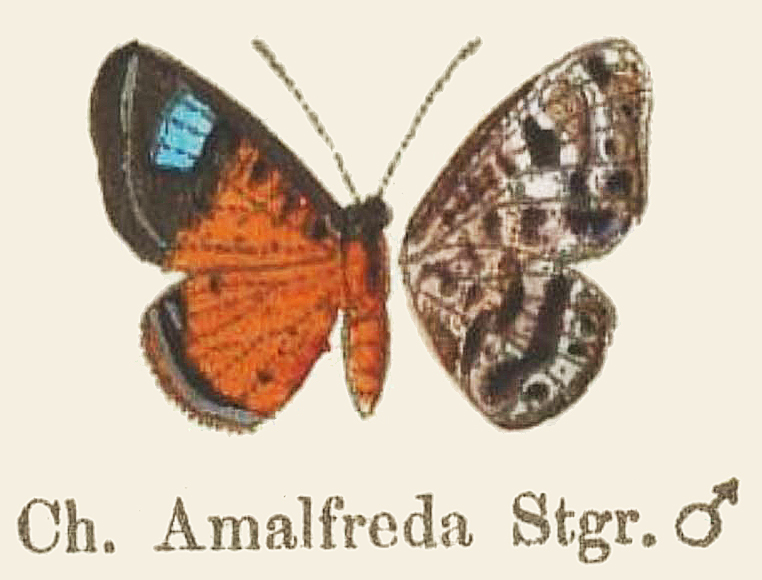
- illustration accompanying the original description

Scientific classification
- Kingdom: Animalia
- Phylum: Arthropoda
- Class: Insecta
- Order: Lepidoptera
- Family: Riodinidae
- Genus: Argyrogrammana
- Species: A. amalfreda

Binomial name
- Argyrogrammana amalfreda (Staudinger, [1887])

= Argyrogrammana amalfreda =

Species of butterfly

Argyrogrammana amalfreda described by Otto Staudinger in 1887 is a butterfly of the family Riodinidae It is endemic to Peru.

== Description ==
The whole hindwing, except the border, and the proximal half of the forewing are red with small fine black spots. In the black distal half of the forewing is a smalt-like spot; before the border a metallic line. images.
