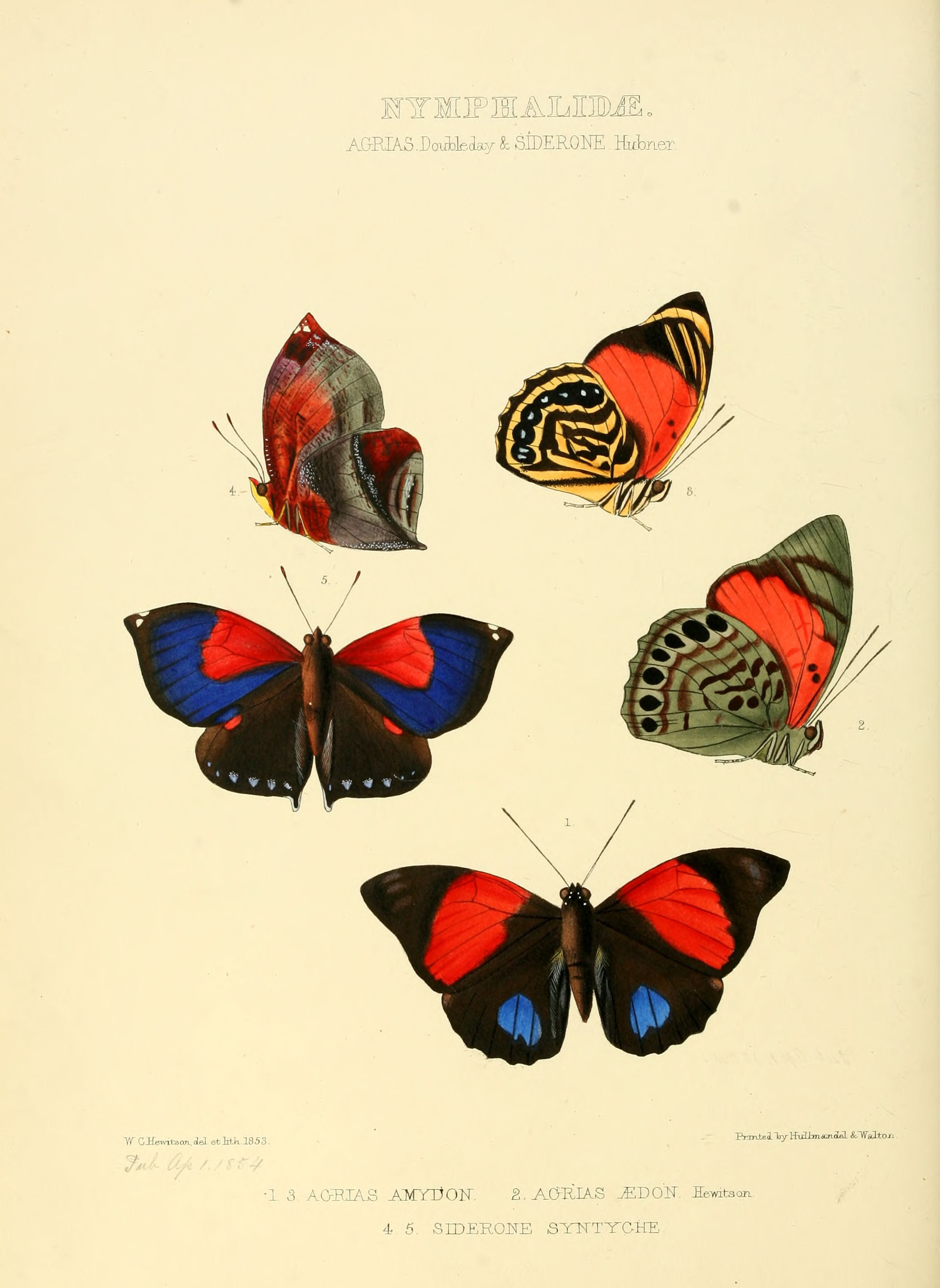
- Siderone syntyche, figures 4 and 5 from Hewitson's Illustrations of New Species of Exotic Butterflies

Scientific classification
- Kingdom: Animalia
- Phylum: Arthropoda
- Clade: Pancrustacea
- Class: Insecta
- Order: Lepidoptera
- Family: Nymphalidae
- Tribe: Anaeini
- Genus: Siderone; Hübner, [1823]

Synonyms
- Siderone Boisduval, [1836]; Phyllophasis Blanchard, 1840; Sideronidia Bryk, 1939

= Siderone =

Genus of butterflies

Siderone is a Neotropical nymphalid butterfly genus in the subfamily Charaxinae.

== Species ==
- Siderone galanthis (Cramer, [1775]) – scarlet leafwing, red-and-black leafwing, or red-striped leafwing
- Siderone syntyche Hewitson, 1854 – red-patched leafwing
