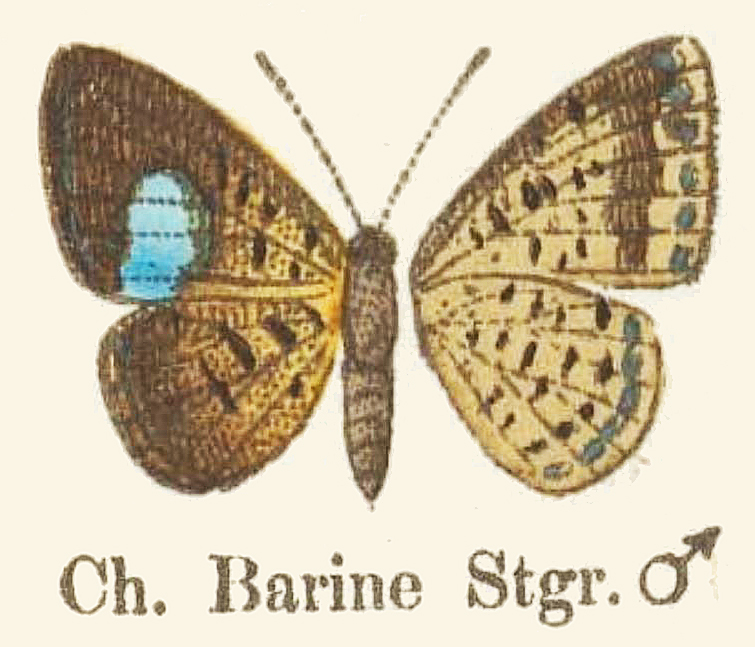
- illustration accompanying the original description

Scientific classification
- Kingdom: Animalia
- Phylum: Arthropoda
- Class: Insecta
- Order: Lepidoptera
- Family: Riodinidae
- Genus: Argyrogrammana
- Species: A. barine

Binomial name
- Argyrogrammana barine (Staudinger, [1887])

= Argyrogrammana barine =

Species of butterfly

Argyrogrammana barine described by Otto Staudinger in 1887 is a butterfly of the family Riodinidae It is found in Costa Rica, Ecuador and Colombia.

== Description ==
A. barine Stgr. (135, as barsine). The male has behind the middle of the forewing a smalt-like spot placed on the inner margin, and dark small spots in the disc of both wings: the female is lighter, yellowish-grey, with darker macular bands and a blackish distal marginal part of the forewing with a blue spot before the middle of the border. images.
