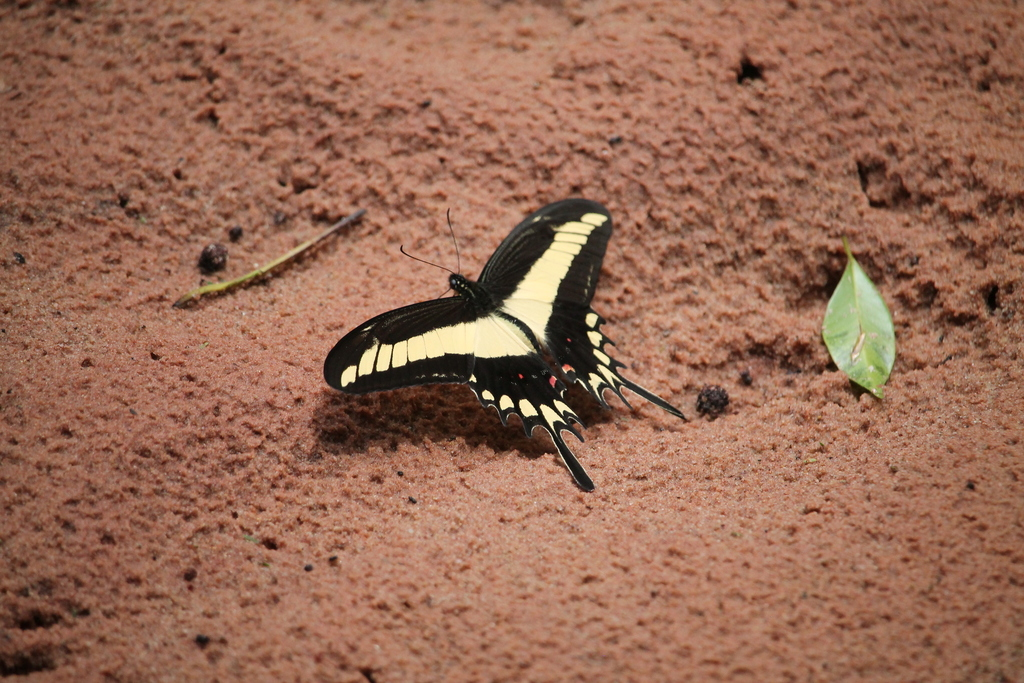

Scientific classification
- Kingdom: Animalia
- Phylum: Arthropoda
- Clade: Pancrustacea
- Class: Insecta
- Order: Lepidoptera
- Family: Papilionidae
- Genus: Papilio
- Species: P. lamarchei

Binomial name
- Papilio lamarchei Staudinger, 1892

= Papilio lamarchei =

Species of butterfly

Papilio lamarchei, the lamarche's swallowtail, is a species of swallowtail butterfly from the genus Papilio that is found from Argentina to Bolivia.

== Description ==
The yellow band narrower than in Papilio himeros, forewing without yellow spot distally of the anterior angle of the cell; hindwing very strongly dentate, tail without yellow spot at the tip. Harpe short and rounded, whilst in himeros it is long and pointed.

== Taxonomy ==
Papilio lamarchei is a member of the species group torquatus.
