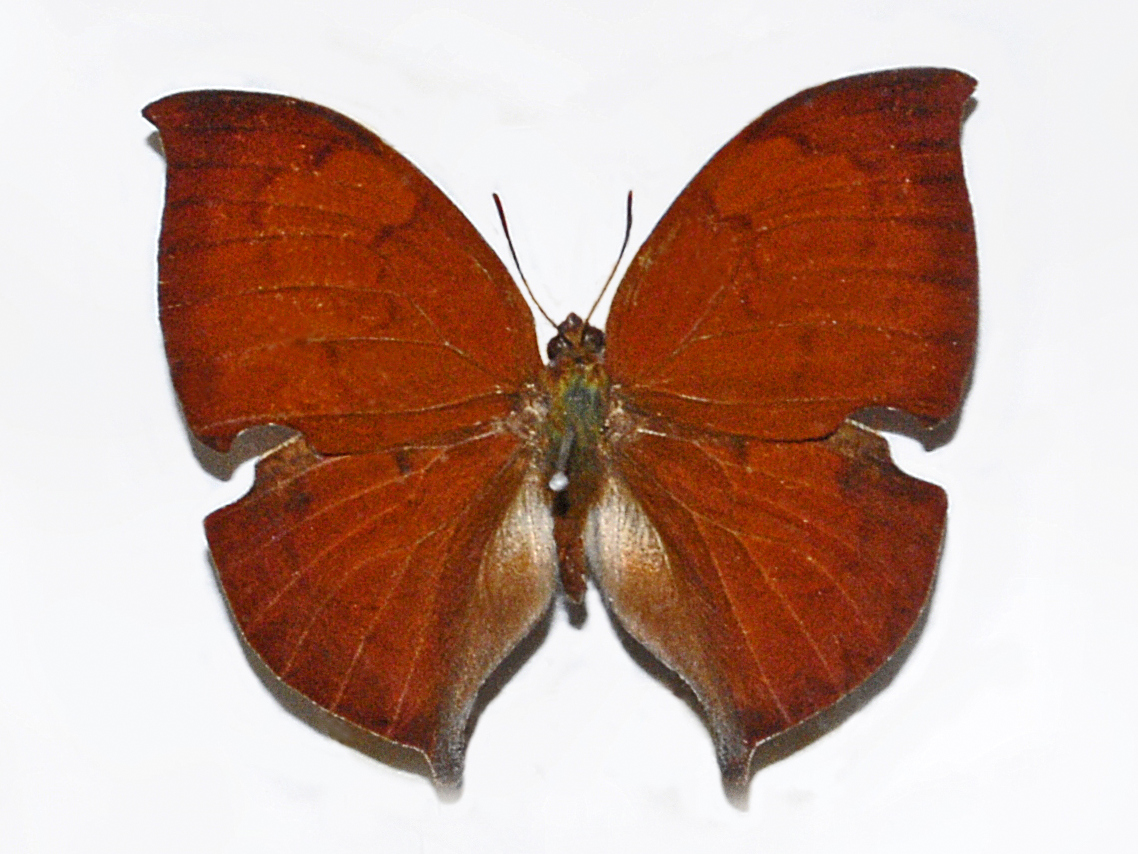
- Upperside, from Brazil
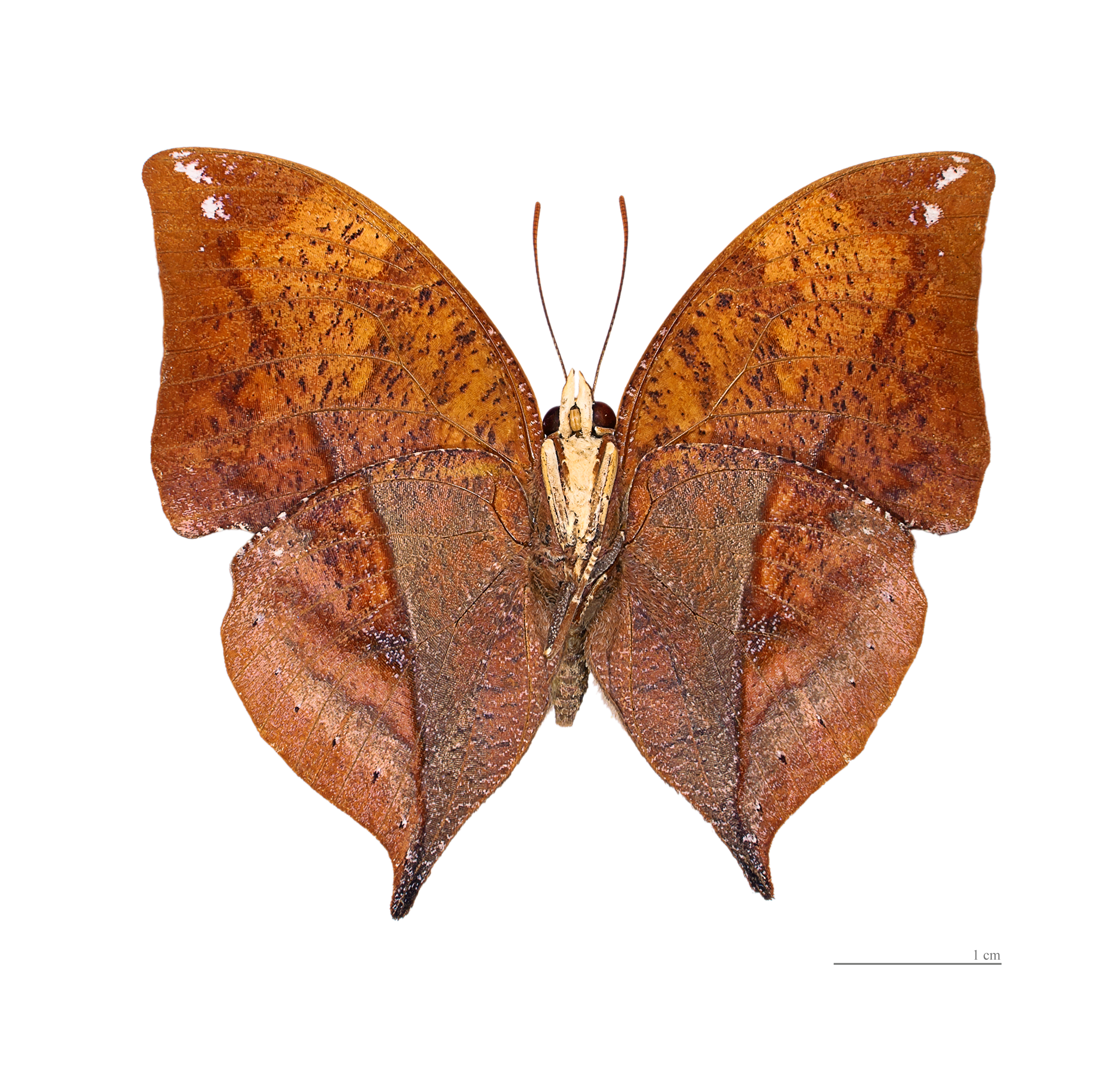
- Underside

Scientific classification
- Kingdom: Animalia
- Phylum: Arthropoda
- Class: Insecta
- Order: Lepidoptera
- Family: Nymphalidae
- Genus: Zaretis
- Species: Z. itys

Binomial name
- Zaretis itys (Cramer, [1777])

Synonyms
- Papilio itys Cramer, [1777]; Anaea itys; Siderone itys itylus Westwood, 1850; Zaretes pseuditys Fruhstorfer, 1909

= Zaretis itys =

Species of butterfly

Zaretis itys, the skeletonized leafwing or leaf wing butterfly, is a Neotropical nymphalid butterfly genus in the subfamily Charaxinae.

== Subspecies ==
- Zaretis itys itys - Surinam
- Zaretis itys itylus (Westwood, 1850) - Brazil (Rio de Janeiro, Espírito Santo)

== Description ==
Zaretis itys has a wingspan of about 55–60 millimetres (2.2–2.4 in). The upperside of both wings is dull orange. The underside of the wings simulates dried leaves in colour and pattern. The ground colour is usually earthy brown.

== Biology ==
Caterpillars feed on leaves of Casearia and Laetia species (Salicaceae). They usually bind their droppings together with silk as protection from ants.

== Distribution ==
This species can be found from Mexico to the Guyanas, Paraguay, Suriname and Brazil.

== Bibliography ==
- Muyshondt, 1973 - Notes on the life cycle and natural history of butterflies of El Salvador. II. Anaea (Zaretis) itys J. Lep. Soc. 27: 294-302
- Carlos Guilherme C. MielkeI; Olaf H. H. MielkeII; Mirna M. Casagrande Comparative study of the external morphology of Zaretis itys itylus (Westwood) and Agrias claudina annetta (Gray)
