= Anton Hermann Fassl =

Anton Heinrich Hermann Fassl (7 December 1876, Komotau – 4 October 1922, Manaos) was a Bohemian entomologist and natural history specimen collector who worked in South America.

Fassl was born in Komotau, Bohemia, son of a Anton senior (1848–1916) who was an antique goods dealer. In 1906, there was a case of theft against him by Hermann Rolle of the Kosmos natural history institute where Fassl worked briefly. Fassl was briefly sent to remand and then acquitted. A fresh appeal was made against the verdict but by then he had moved to South America with Otto Garlepp. Fassl collected Lepidoptera and Coleoptera in Colombia (1907-1908), Brazil and Ecuador. In 1912 he went back to South America with his brother Eduard Fassl. He was sometime in Berlin, sometime at a dealership Naturhistorisches-Institut, 948 Zeidlerstrasse, Teplitz, Bohemia, Austria-Hungary (now Teplice, the Czech Republic). Following World War I, he settled at La Paz and began to supply specimens. He hired the services of collectors Hugo Carlos Boy and Alois Strympl with whom he clashed. He supplied specimens to Ernst Hartert and Karl Jordan. He died aboard a steamer Manauense below Teffé on the Amazon River.

== Works ==
- Fassl, A. H. (1910): Die Raupe einer Uranide. Z. wiss. Insekt. Biol., 6(10): 355.
- Fassl, A. H. (1912): Kämpfende Schmetterlinge Entomologische Rundschau 29(10), pp. [71-72]
- Fassl, A. H. (1912–13): Tropische Reisen. IV. Muzo, das Land der schönsten Smaragde und Schmetterlinge Entomologische Rundschau 29(23), pp. 147–149; (24)155-157; 30(1)3-4; (3)14-16.
- Fassl, A. H. (1922): Einige kritische Bemerkungen zu J. Röbers Mimikry und verwandte Erscheinungen bei Schmetterlingen" Entomologische Rundschau 39(4), pp. 15–16; (5)18-19; (6)22
- Fassl, A. H. (1922): Einige kritische Bemerkungen zu J. Röbers "Mimikry und verwandte Erscheinungen bei Schmetterlingen" Entomologische Rundschau 39(7), pp. 26–27
- Fassl, A. H. (1924): Nachträge: Gattung Agrias. In: Die Gross- Schmetterlinge der Erde (Seitz, A. ed.), vol. 5, Alfred Kernen, Stuttgart, pp. [1037- 1040; 1041 pl. 113

== Other sources ==
- Anonymous 1925: [Fassl, A. H. H. jun.] Ent. News, Philadelphia 36 : 96
