= Cörmigk =

- Stadtteil of Könnern
- Interactive map of Cörmigk
- Location within Germany Location within Saxony-Anhalt
- Coordinates: 51°44′N 11°51′E
- Country: Germany
- State: Saxony-Anhalt
- District: Salzlandkreis
- Town: Könnern

Area
  - Total: 7.48 km^{2} (2.89 sq mi)
- Elevation: 74 m (243 ft)

Population (2006-12-31)
  - Total: 545
  - Density: 72.9/km^{2} (189/sq mi)
- Time zone: UTC+01:00 (CET)
  - Summer (DST): UTC+02:00 (CEST)
- Postal codes: 06408
- Dialling codes: 034722

Cörmigk is a village and a former municipality in the district Salzlandkreis, in Saxony-Anhalt, Germany.

Since 1 January 2010, it is part of the town Könnern.
