= Maximilian Kuschel =

Maximilian Kuschel (1851–1909, Breslau) was a German ornithologist and oologist.

Kuschel was sometime a police official (Polizeirat a. D. Polizei-Praesidium) in Guhrau and Breslau. He was a Member of Deutsche Ornithologen-Gesellschaft. An accepted authority on eggs Kuschel owned a large collection now in the State Museum of Zoology, Dresden. He was a Tring correspondent.

== Works ==
- Kuschel, M., 1895 Zur Oologie Javas. Ornithologische Monatsberichte, III 153–156.
- Kuschel, M., 1895 Abrifs einer Beschreibung von Vogeleiern der äthiopischen Ornis. Kuschel, M. Journal für Ornithologie vol. 43 p. 80 - 98 and 321 - 354
- Kuschel, M., 1897 Ûber die Fortpflanzung von Cassidix oryzivora Scl. Journal für Ornithologie. 45: 168-170
