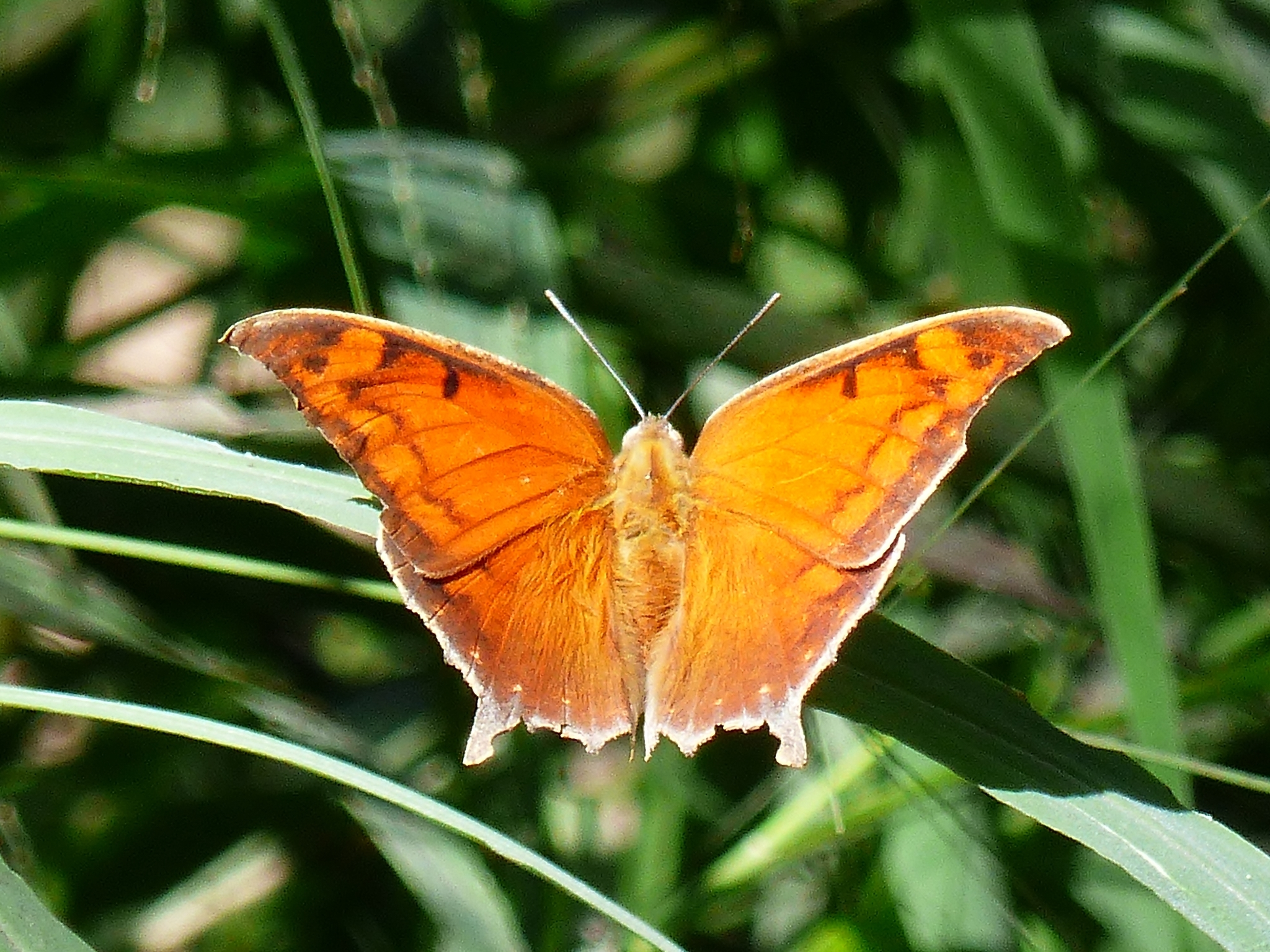
- Anaea aidea

Scientific classification
- Domain: Eukaryota
- Kingdom: Animalia
- Phylum: Arthropoda
- Class: Insecta
- Order: Lepidoptera
- Family: Nymphalidae
- Subfamily: Charaxinae
- Tribe: Anaeini; Reuter, 1896

Genera
- Ten, see text

= Anaeini =

Tribe of butterflies

Anaeini is a tribe of Neotropical brush-footed butterflies. Their wing undersides usually mimic dead leaves.

Included genera (and notable species) are:

- Anaea Hübner, [1819]
- Coenophlebia
- Consul
- Fountainea (several formerly in Anaea)
- Hypna
- Memphis (formerly included in Anaea)
- Polygrapha
- Siderone
- Zaretis Hübner, [1819]

Anaeomorpha is sometimes placed here, but more often in the Preponini.
