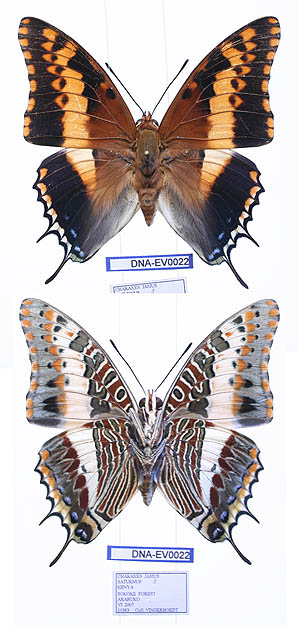
- C. saturnus, Sokokoe Forest, Coastal Kenya

Conservation status
- Least Concern (IUCN 3.1).

Scientific classification
- Kingdom: Animalia
- Phylum: Arthropoda
- Class: Insecta
- Order: Lepidoptera
- Family: Nymphalidae
- Genus: Charaxes
- Species: C. saturnus

Binomial name
- Charaxes saturnus (Butler, 1865)

Synonyms
- Charaxes saturnus var. laticinctus Butler, 1895; Charaxes pelias saturnus Butler, 1865; Charaxes pelias saturnus ab. brunnesceusRothschild & Jordan, 1900; Charaxes pelias brunnescens; Charaxes pelias saturnus ab. laticinctus Rothschild & Jordan, 1900; Charaxes jasius saturnus van Someren, 1963; Charaxes jasius brunnescens van Someren, 1963; Charaxes saturnus brunnescens Turlin 2005

= Charaxes saturnus =

Species of butterfly

Charaxes saturnus, the foxy charaxes or koppie charaxes, is a butterfly that flies through most of the Savannah of the Eastern and Southern Afrotropical realm, and also occurs in suitable forest habitat locations including the forest belt of west-central Africa.

== Description ==
Charaxes saturnus[stat.rev.2005] is a medium to large butterfly, with forewing length of 40–44 mm in the male, and 46–50 mm in the female. The background colour of all four wings is a very dark blackish brown, with a broad orange postdiscal band traversing both pairs of wings from the leading edge of the forewings almost to the anal margin of the hindwings. The forewing outer margins are orange traversed by black-scaled veins. The hindwing has six orange marginal lunules, the lower three are white-edged to completely white. There are typically three or four blue submarginal spots towards the anal angle. The body and the basal area of all four wings is a tawny orange-brown. The underside exhibits a very characteristic mosaic appearance broadly similar to a number of closely related species, traversed by a jumble of bands, and of reddish, brown, and greyish patches, all edged with a filigree of white. Beyond the inner mosaic, a white complete postdiscal band bridges across fore- to hindwings. The outer orange marginal coloration is present on the underside as narrow white-edged lunules, bounded by a grey submarginal band. The female resembles the male but is larger. Both sexes of Charaxes saturnus are similar to females of Charaxes achaemenes. and Charaxes guderiana.

=== Hybridisation ===
Where C. saturnus is sympatric with Charaxes epijasius[stat.rev.2005], over an extensive zone of overlap, the two species hybridize regularly, producing highly variable transitional specimens(C. saturnus x C. epijasius). The distribution range of hybrid forms extends from Ethiopia to Western Kenya & Northern Tanzania. The variable hybrid forms have historically been named as harrisoni, saturnalis, and pagenstecheri Observation of hybrid forms in Tanzania, as an example, beyond the recognised range of C. epijasius, strongly indicates that the hybrid forms may exist as fertile hybrids, at a lower prevalence than the relatively more stable phenotype of C. saturnus. More detailed phylogenetic research and breeding studies are required to elucidate further the relationships between the two species and their intermediate hybrid phenotypes, and the degree of fertility exhibited amongst their highly variable intermediate forms.

=== Subspecies ===
- C. saturnus saturnus, Butler, 1866. (TL="Interior of Africa")

In the western areas of its range, it is more variable which has led to some earlier authors to suggest a western subspecies (e.g. Poulton, 1926, TL= N. Angola). Recent detailed re-evaluation found no western locality-depended areas with consistent population phenotypes which could merit infraspecific definition, including in Angola.

The Charaxini taxa harrisoni, saturnalis, and pagenstecheri are now thought to be at least partially fertile hybrid variable phenotypes of (C. saturnus x C. epijasius). This would suggest that evolutionary divergence to fully stable species separation between C. epijasius and C. saturnus is not complete. Further phylogenetic research is required to clarify the current position further.

=== Related species ===
Historical attempts to assemble a cluster of presumably related species into a "Charaxes jasius Group" have not been wholly convincing. More recent taxonomic revision, corroborated by phylogenetic research, allow a more rational grouping congruent with cladistic relationships. Within a well-populated clade of 27 related species sharing a common ancestor approximately 16 mya during the Miocene, 26 are now considered together as The jasius Group. One of the two lineages forms a robust clade of seven species sharing a common ancestor approximately 2-3 mya, i.e. during the Pliocene, and are considered as the jasius subgroup.

The jasius Group (26 Species)

Clade 1: jasius subgroup (7 species):

- Charaxes jasius
- Charaxes epijasius [stat.rev.2005]
- Charaxes legeri
- Charaxes saturnus [stat.rev.2005]
- Charaxes pelias
- Charaxes castor
- Charaxes hansali

Clade 2: contains the well-populated three additional subgroups (19 species) of the jasius Group, called the brutus, pollux, and eudoxus subgroups. Further exploration of the phylogenetic relationships amongst existing Charaxes taxa is required to improve clarity.

== Distribution ==
Where appropriate habitat occurs, from Ethiopia, Somalia, Kenya, Uganda, Tanzania, across to the west in Central African Republic, Gabon, Democratic Republic of Congo, Angola, and all of southern Africa down to East London (Eastern Cape Province), but not the Mediterranean climate of the Weastern Cape Province, where it is replaced by Charaxes pelias. It is not known to occur in Equatorial Guinea, Rwanda or Burundi.

== Habitat ==
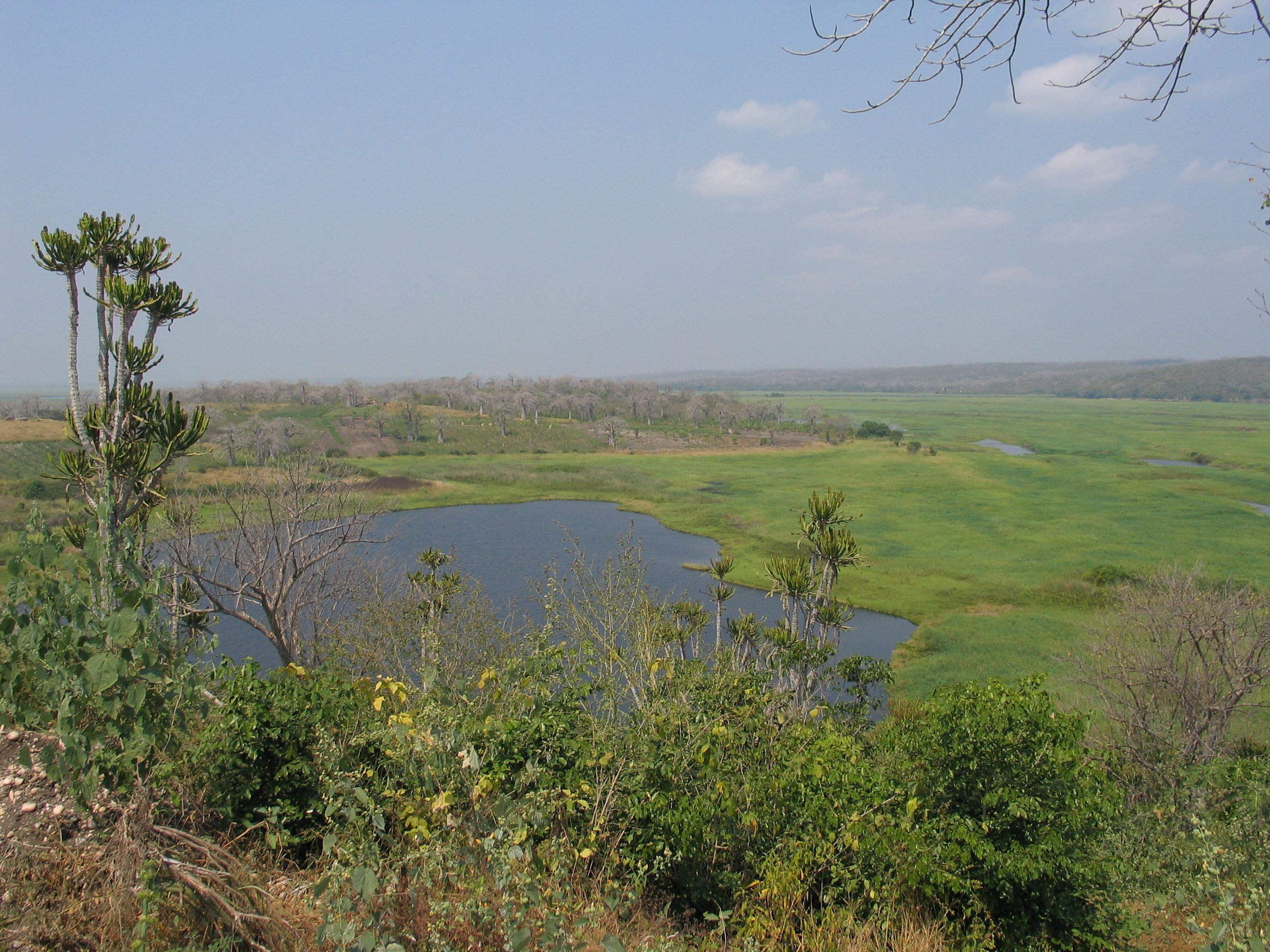
NW Angola scarp savanna and woodland

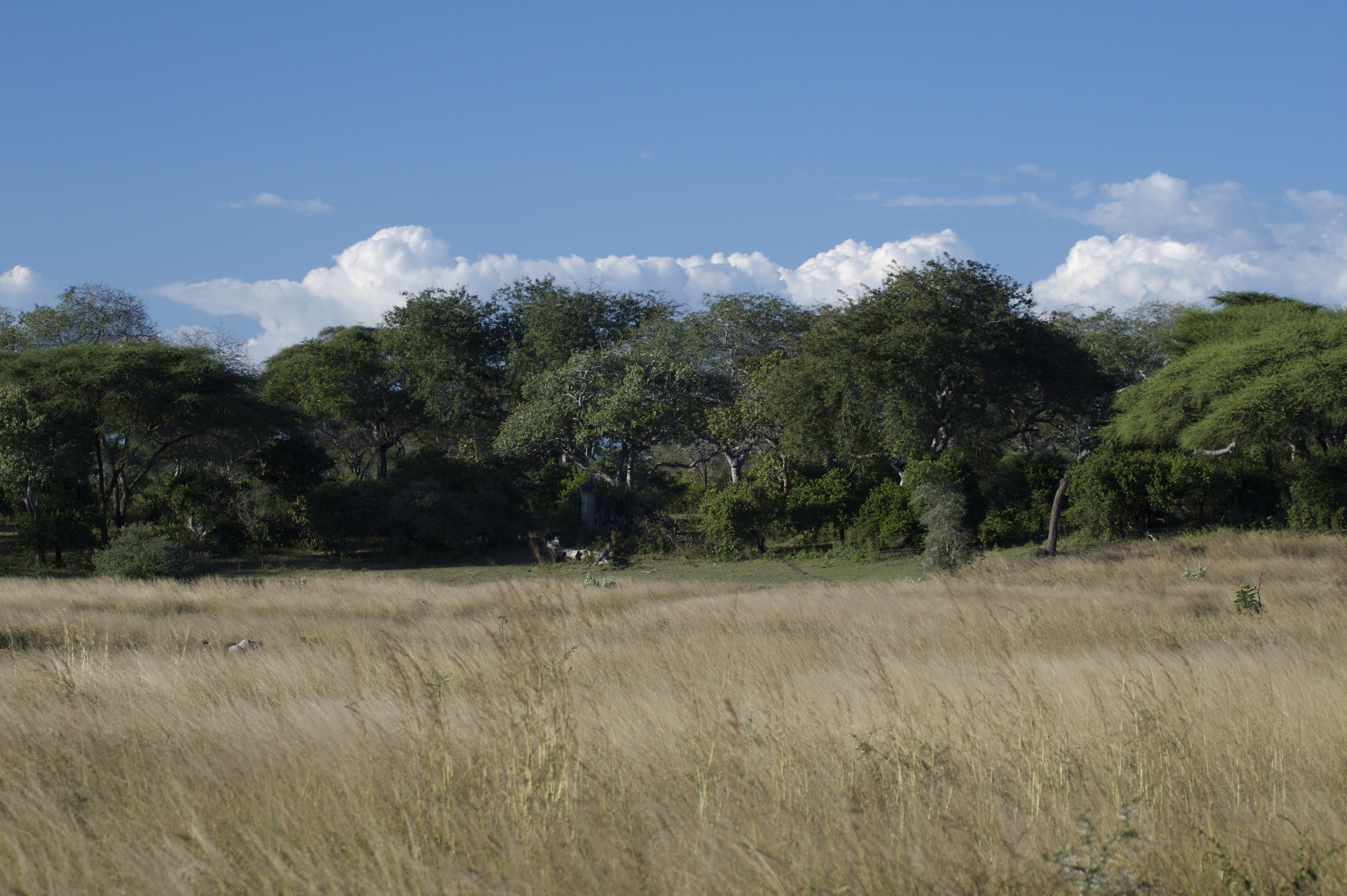
Riverside savanna and woodland habitat, Mpanda, Tanzania

Savannah and open woodland, from sea level – 2200 m; lower slopes of Kilimanjaro; and similar habitats found across the South African Veldt including Koppie habitats. In Angola and the central African forest belt, it occurs in open and closed-canopy woodland and secondary forest areas also.

== Natural history ==
C. saturnus is continuously brooded and flies throughout the year.

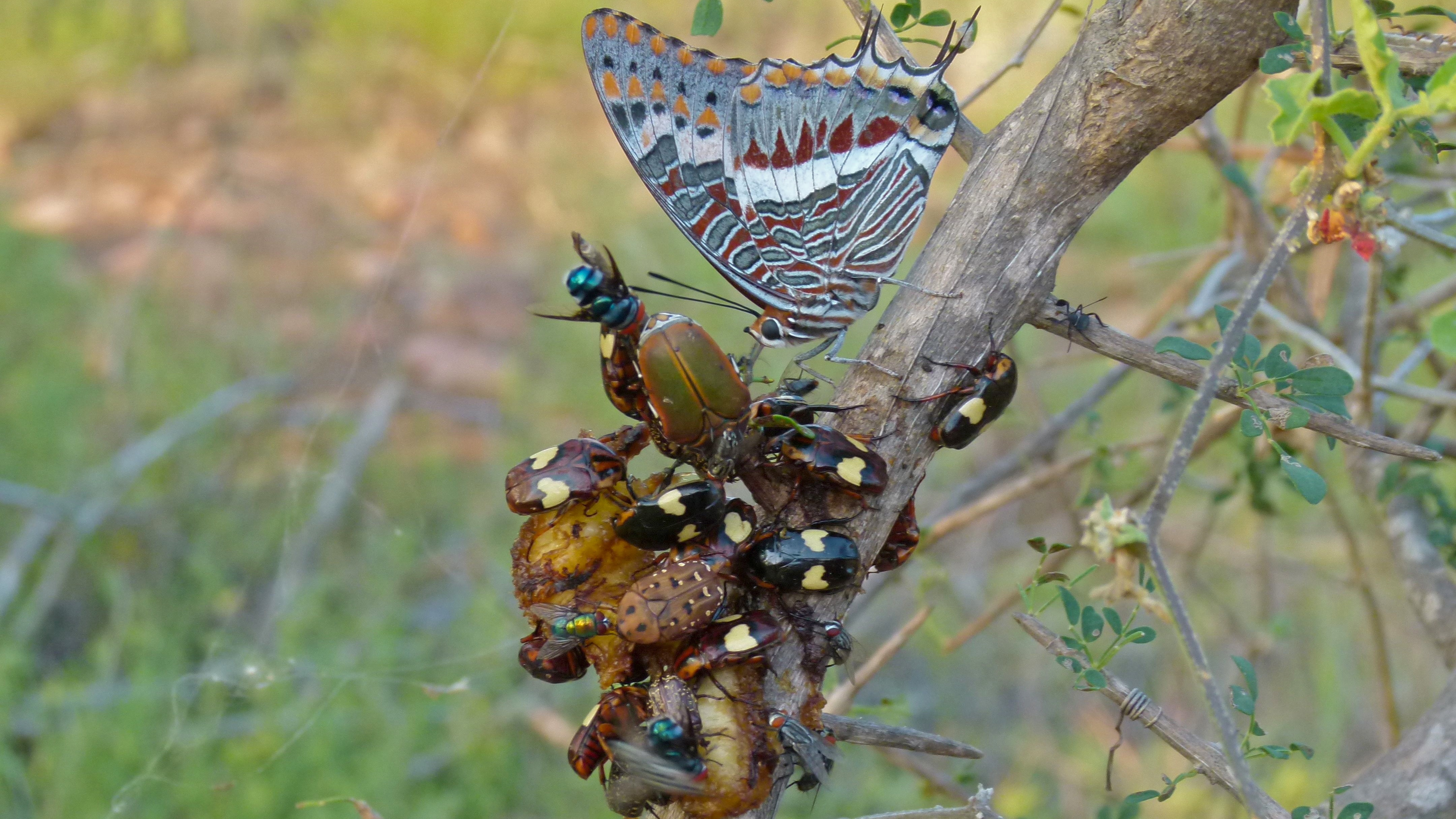
Foxy emperor (Charaxes saturnus), Kruger, South Africa

=== Life cycle ===
The early stages from egg to pupa are described in detail by Dr. V. G. L. van Someren & Rev. K. St. A. Rogers

==== Larva ====
After hatching, the larva eats the remaining eggshell, rests for 12hrs, and commences nocturnal habit of devouring leaves on the host plant, non-selective as to age and size of leaf. The larva spins a silken refuge on a selected leaf to rest during the day. The larva is initially yellowish-olive with a blackish-brown head bearing short tubercles. The body is finely papillated, and two pale tails arise from the anal segment. After the first moult, the larva is green, with a green face.

=== Larval food plants ===
Larvae polyphagous on a wide range of hosts including Brachystegia, Hibiscus, Croton sp., Afzelia quanzensis, Bauhinia galpinii, Burkea africana, Schotia brachypetala, the red spike-thorn shrub and tree Gymnosporia senegalensis, Colophospermum mopane, Xanthocerces zambesiaca, Julbernardia globiflora, Xeroderris stuhlmannii, Guibourtia conjugata, Catha edulis.
