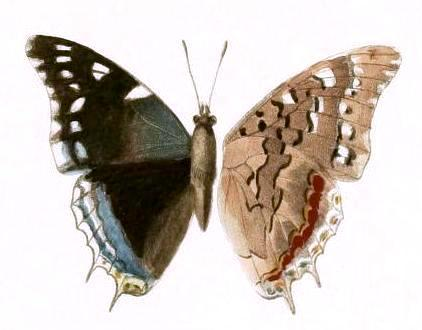
- Male
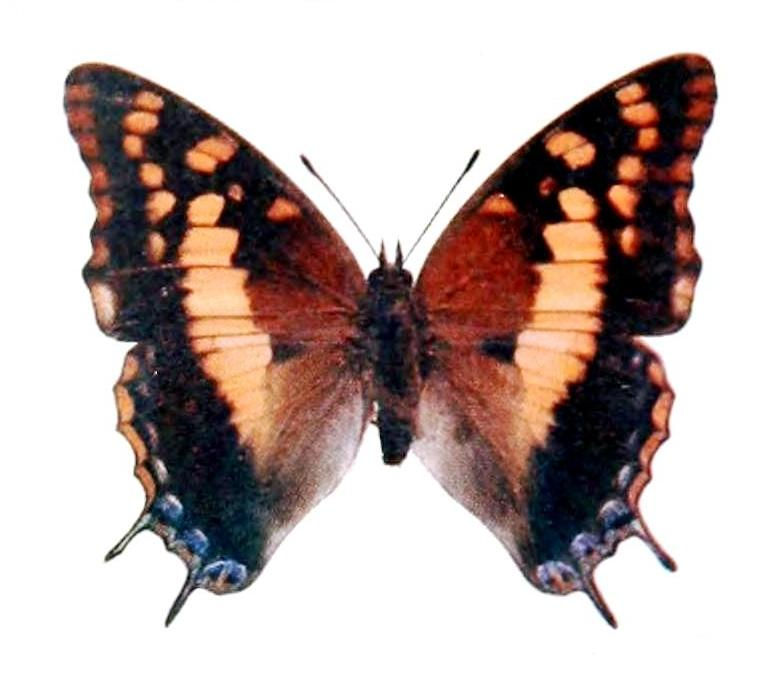
- Female

Conservation status
- Least Concern (IUCN 3.1)

Scientific classification
- Kingdom: Animalia
- Phylum: Arthropoda
- Clade: Pancrustacea
- Class: Insecta
- Order: Lepidoptera
- Family: Nymphalidae
- Genus: Charaxes
- Species: C. guderiana

Binomial name
- Charaxes guderiana (Dewitz, 1879)

Synonyms
- Nymphalis guderiana Dewitz, 1879; Charaxes pelias var. tanganyika Robbe, 1892; Charaxes guderiana ab. burtti Carpenter, 1945

= Charaxes guderiana =

Blue-spangled emperor

Species of butterfly

Charaxes guderiana, the blue-spangled emperor, Guderian's charaxes or blue-spangled charaxes, is a butterfly of the family Nymphalidae. It is found in southern Africa.

== Description ==
The wingspan is 50–60 mm in males and 60–70 mm in females.Ch. guderiana Dew. male: wings above black; forewing at the base greenish blue with a large white spot at the end of the cell, two white discal spots in 5 and 6, a complete row of 8 white, or towards the hindmargin bluish postdiscal spots and large white marginal spots; hindwing in cellules 2–5 with a blue postdiscal band, which is only separated by a fine black line from the bluish, white-dotted submarginal streaks; marginal streaks thick, white, in cellules lc—3 usually bluish and dotted with yellowish. Under surface with two white spots at the costal margin of the fore wing. The female is quite different above, strongly recalling Charaxes saturnus and the female of Charaxes achaemenes; it was even described in 1892 as a variety of Charaxes pelias. Wings above at the base light brown to vein 3 and then with common light orange-yellow median band, extending from vein 2 of the hindwing to vein 4 of the forewing; the forewing has in addition the following orange-yellow markings: a spot at the apex of the cell, two discal spots in 5 and 6, a postdiscal row of 6 rounded spots in 2—7 and large marginal spots united into a band; the ground-colour of the apical part is black. On the hindwing the median band is followed distally by a deep black band 10 mm. in breadth and then the blue, white-centred submarginal spots and the marginal spots, which in cellules 4—7 are thick and bright orange-yellow, but in lc—3 narrow, greenish and indistinctly dotted with yellow. The under surface is much lighter than in the male, the median band being also present here; hindwing with red postdiscal lunules. Angola to British East Africa, but not in South Africa. A full description is also given by Rothschild, W. And Jordan, K., 1900 Novitates Zoologicae Volume 7:473 et seq. (for terms see Novitates Zoologicae Volume 5:545-601 ) The female of Charaxes guderiana is similar to both sexes of Charaxes saturnus and to the female of Charaxes achaemenes.

== Biology ==
It has its habitat in Brachystegia woodland. Its flight period is year round. Larvae feed on Brachystegia spicaeformis, Brachystegia boehmii, Brachystegia taxifolia, Julbernardia globiflora, Amblygonocarpus andongensis, and Dalbergia lactea. A common butterfly of Miombo woodlands. Notes on the biology of guderiana are provided by Kielland, J. (1990), Larsen, T.B. (1991) and Pringle et al. (1994)

== Subspecies ==
Listed alphabetically:

- C. g. guderiana (Dewitz, 1879) (Angola, north-eastern Namibia, north-eastern Botswana, Zimbabwe, Zambia, Democratic Republic of the Congo, Rwanda, southern and western Tanzania, Malawi, Mozambique, South Africa)
- C. g. rabaiensis Poulton, 1929 (coast of Kenya)

== Taxonomy ==
Charaxes guderiana is a member of the large species group Charaxes etheocles.

== Realm ==
Afrotropical realm
