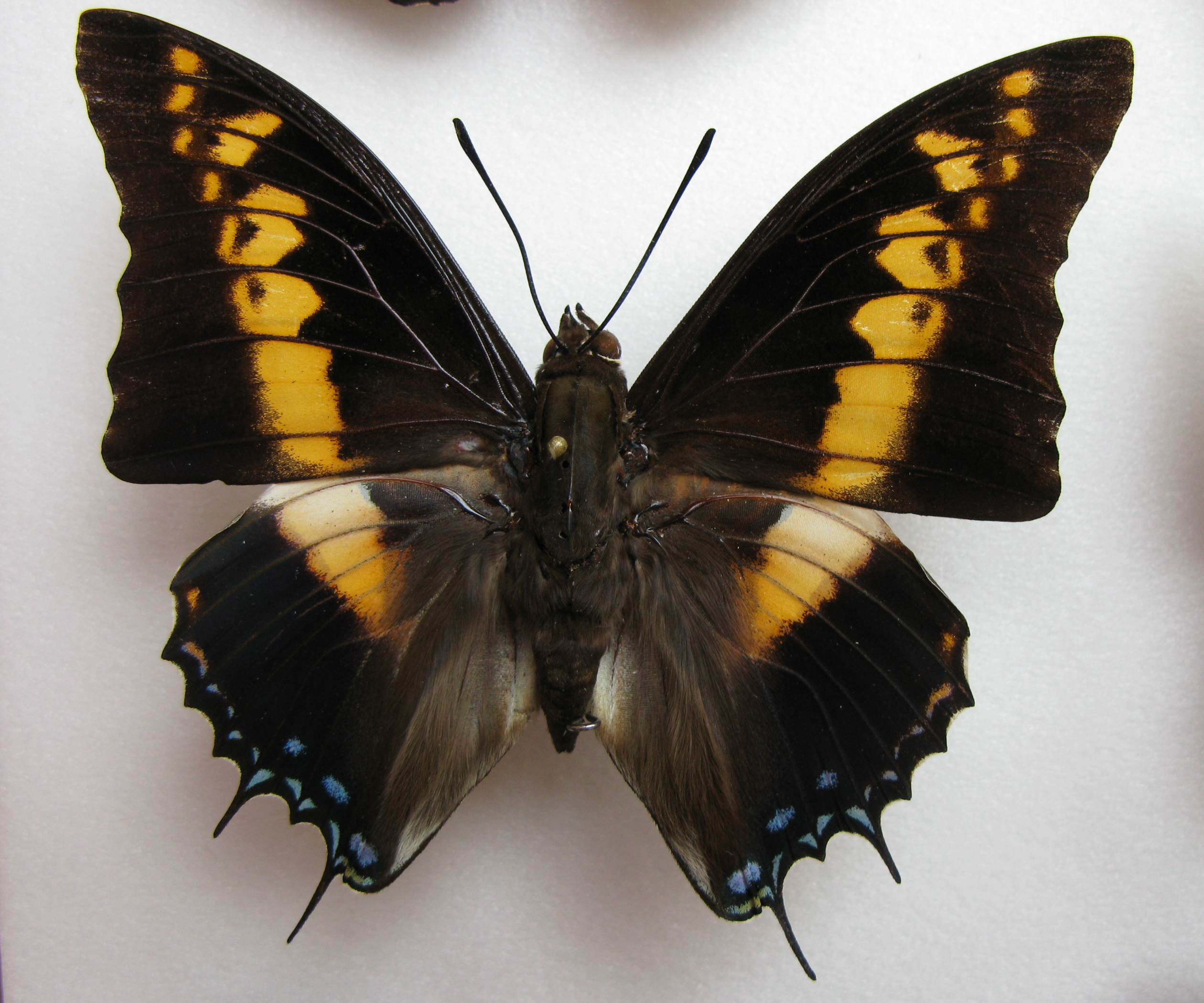
- Giant emperor, Male

Scientific classification
- Kingdom: Animalia
- Phylum: Arthropoda
- Clade: Pancrustacea
- Class: Insecta
- Order: Lepidoptera
- Family: Nymphalidae
- Genus: Charaxes
- Species: C. castor

Binomial name
- Charaxes castor (Cramer, [1775])

Synonyms
- Papilio castor Cramer, 1775 (not Westwood, 1842); Charaxes castor var. godarti Aurivillius, 1899; Charaxes castor f. aginga Stoneham, 1931; Charaxes castor godarti f. severus Biederman, 1935; Charaxes castor f. flavimarginalis Stoneham, 1936; Charaxes castor var. flavifasciatus Butler, 1895; Charaxes castor var. orientalis Lanz, 1896; Charaxes castor flavifasciatus f. reimeri Rothschild, 1900; Charaxes castor flavifasciatus ab. dyscrita van Son, 1979

= Charaxes castor =

Species of butterfly

Charaxes castor, the giant emperor or giant charaxes, is a butterfly of the family Nymphalidae. It is found throughout the Afrotropical realm below the Sahel.

The flight period is year-round but more common in late summer to autumn.

== Description ==
The wingspan is 75–85 mm in males and 85–105 mm in females. The ground-colour of the upper surface deep black, as in Charaxes brutus; the median band is light ochre-yellow, on the forewing anteriorly double, being composed in cellules 2—6 of two more or less completely separated spots, on the hindwing short and triangular, reaching at most to vein 3. On the under surface the white-bordered markings of the basal area are deep black. — castor Cr. has a light orange-yellow median band and the light marginal spots of the forewing are absent or very small; the ground-colour of the under surface is in the basal part red-brown or pure black (= ab. godarti Auriv.). Senegambia to the Congo and Uganda. — flavifasciatus Btlr. is the East African race, which occurs from Delagoa Bay and Nyassaland to Somaliland and only differs in the lighter median band and the more distinct marginal spots on the upperside of the forewing; in this form also the ground-colour in the basal part of the under surface is sometimes red-brown, sometimes pure black (= ab. reimeri Rothsch.). — comoranus Rothsch. agrees with the West African form as regards the colour of the discal band on the upper surface, but differs in the transverse band which accompanies the white discal band of the upper surface on its distal side; this is yellow on the forewing and red-brown on the hindwing and — unlike that of all the continental forms — broken up into spots. Island of Great Comoro.

A full description is given by Walter Rothschild and Karl Jordan, 1900 Novitates Zoologicae Volume 7:287-524. page 436 et seq. (for terms see Novitates Zoologicae Volume 5:545-601 )

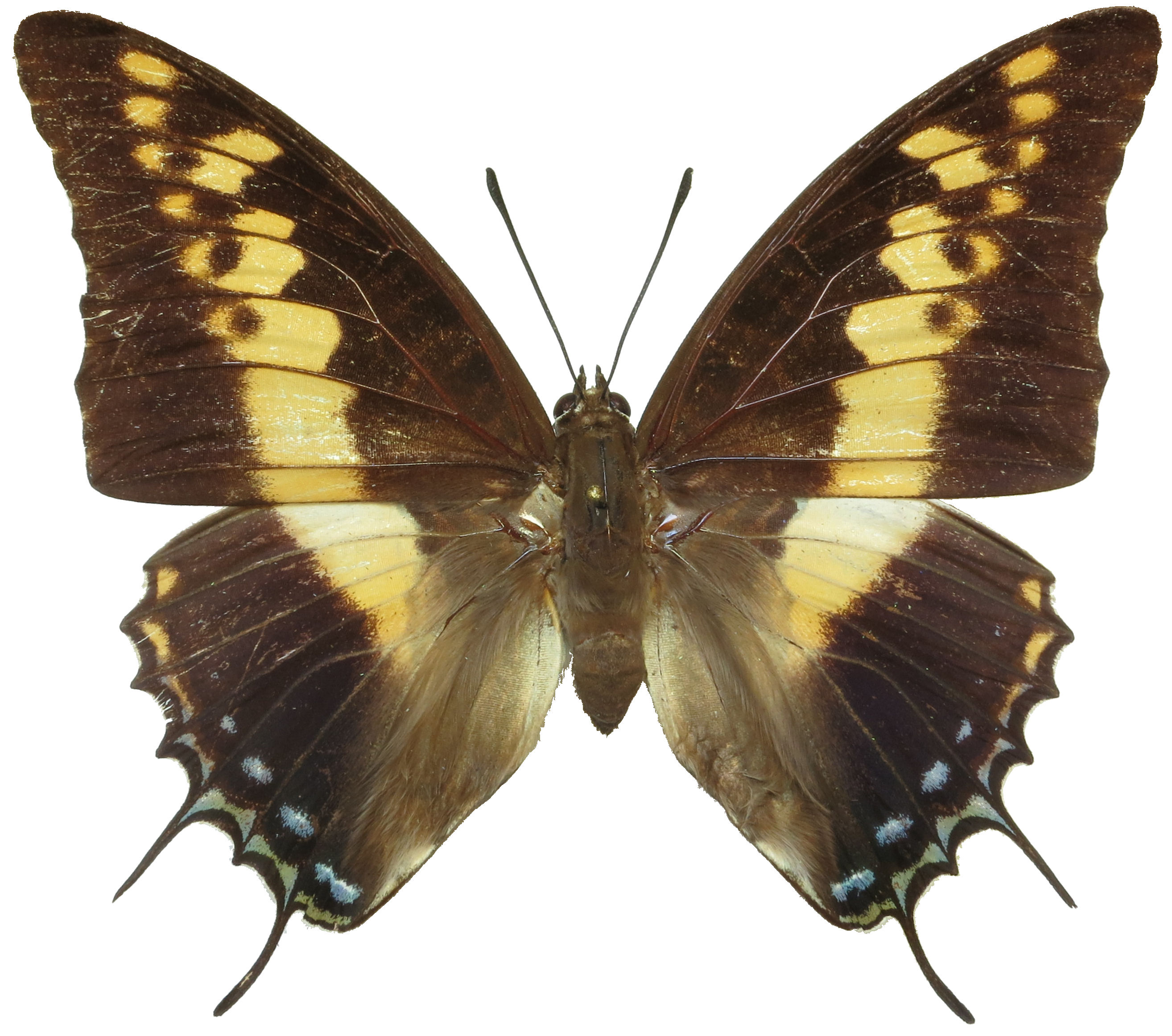
C. castor Female dorsal, from Maka, Central African Republic

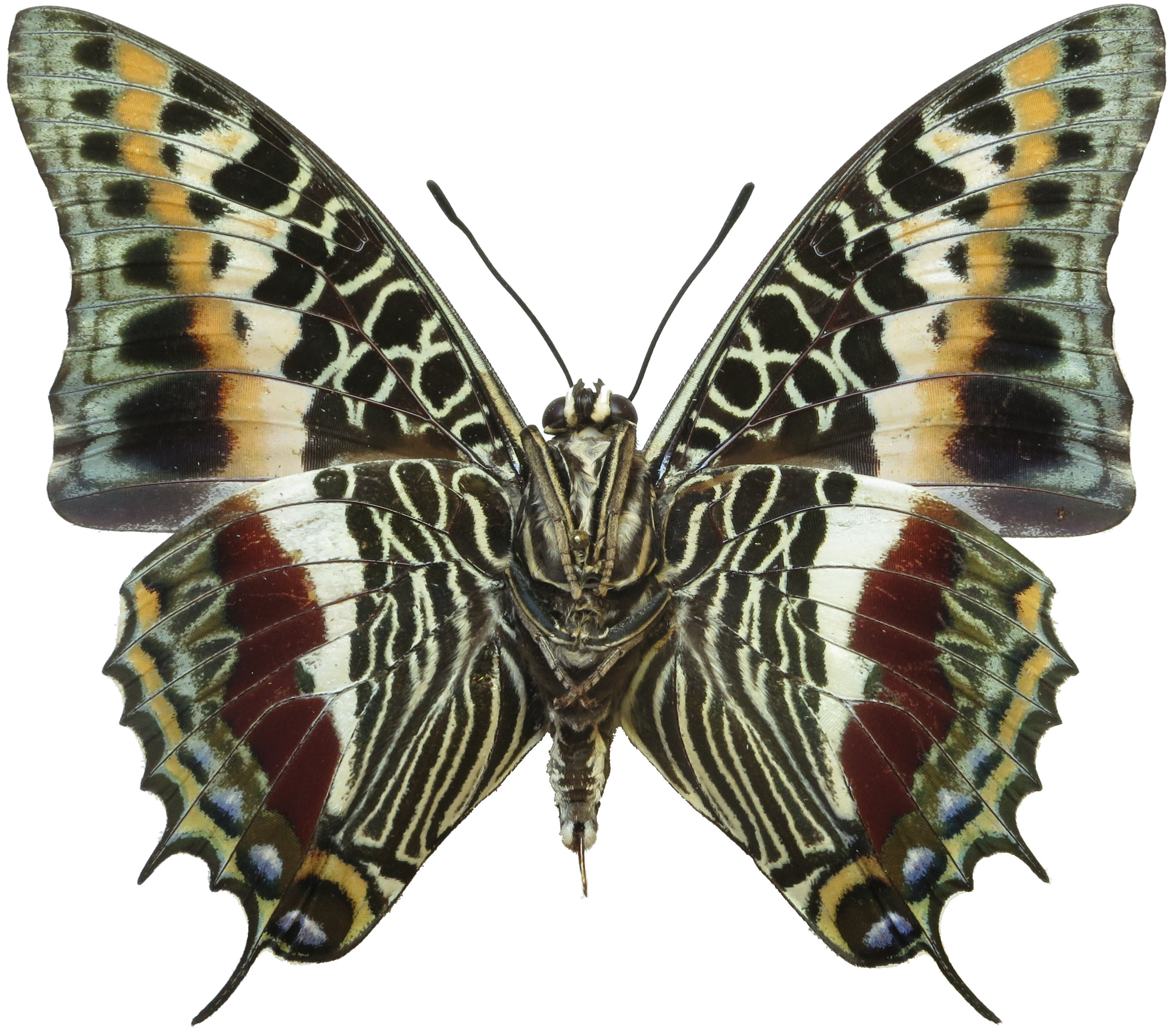
C. castor Male ventral, from the Central African Republic

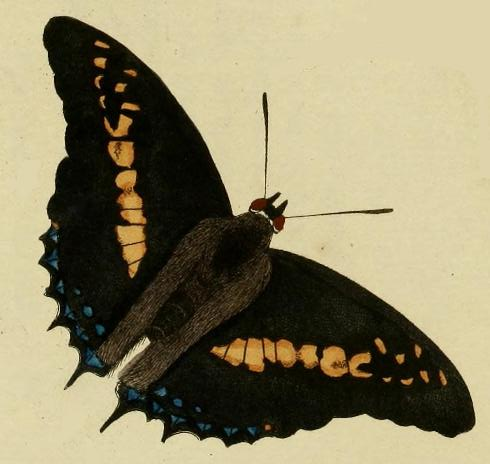
C. castor male

== Natural History ==
Life-sized colour plates and description of the larval and pupal stages of C. castor and additional related species, illustrated by Dr. V. G. L. van Someren, are readily available.

== Biology ==
The habitat is forest and savanna. Notes on the biology of castor are given by Pringle et al (1994), Larsen, T.B. (1991), Larsen, T.B. (2005) and Kielland, J. (1990),

=== Larval foodplants ===
Larvae feed on Bridelia micrantha, Afzelia quanzensis, Tragia spp., Gymnosporia spp., Maytenus senegalensis, Schotia brachypetala, Bridelia micrantha and Cassia fistula.

== Subspecies ==
Listed alphabetically.

- C. c. arthuri van Someren, 1971 (Pemba island)
- C. c. castor (Cramer, [1775]) (throughout African range)
- C. c. comoranus Rothschild, 1903 .(Comoros)
- C. c. flavifasciatus Butler, 1895 (eastern Kenya, northern and eastern Tanzania, Malawi, Mozambique, eastern Zimbabwe, South Africa, Eswatini)

Torben Larsen developed a species numbering system for his 2005 publication Butterflies of West Africa. The nominate subspecies is #736. The 'Larsen' numbers have since been used with permission in A Sharp Eye on Butterflies of Ghana.

== Related Species ==
Historical attempts to assemble a cluster of presumably related species into a "Charaxes jasius Group" have not been wholly convincing. More recent taxonomic revision, corroborated by phylogenetic research, allow a more rational grouping congruent with cladistic relationships. Within a well-populated clade of 27 related species sharing a common ancestor approximately 16 mya during the Miocene, 26 are now considered together as The jasius Group. One of the two lineages forms a robust clade of seven species sharing a common ancestor approximately 2-3 mya, i.e. during the Pliocene, and are considered as the jasius subgroup.

The jasius Group (26 Species)

Clade 1: jasius subgroup (7 species):

- Charaxes jasius
- Charaxes epijasius [stat.rev.2005]
- Charaxes legeri
- Charaxes saturnus [stat.rev.2005]
- Charaxes pelias
- Charaxes castor
- Charaxes hansali

Clade 2: contains the well-populated three additional subgroups (19 species) of the jasius Group, called the brutus, pollux, and eudoxus subgroups. Further exploration of the phylogenetic relationships amongst existing Charaxes taxa is required to improve clarity.
