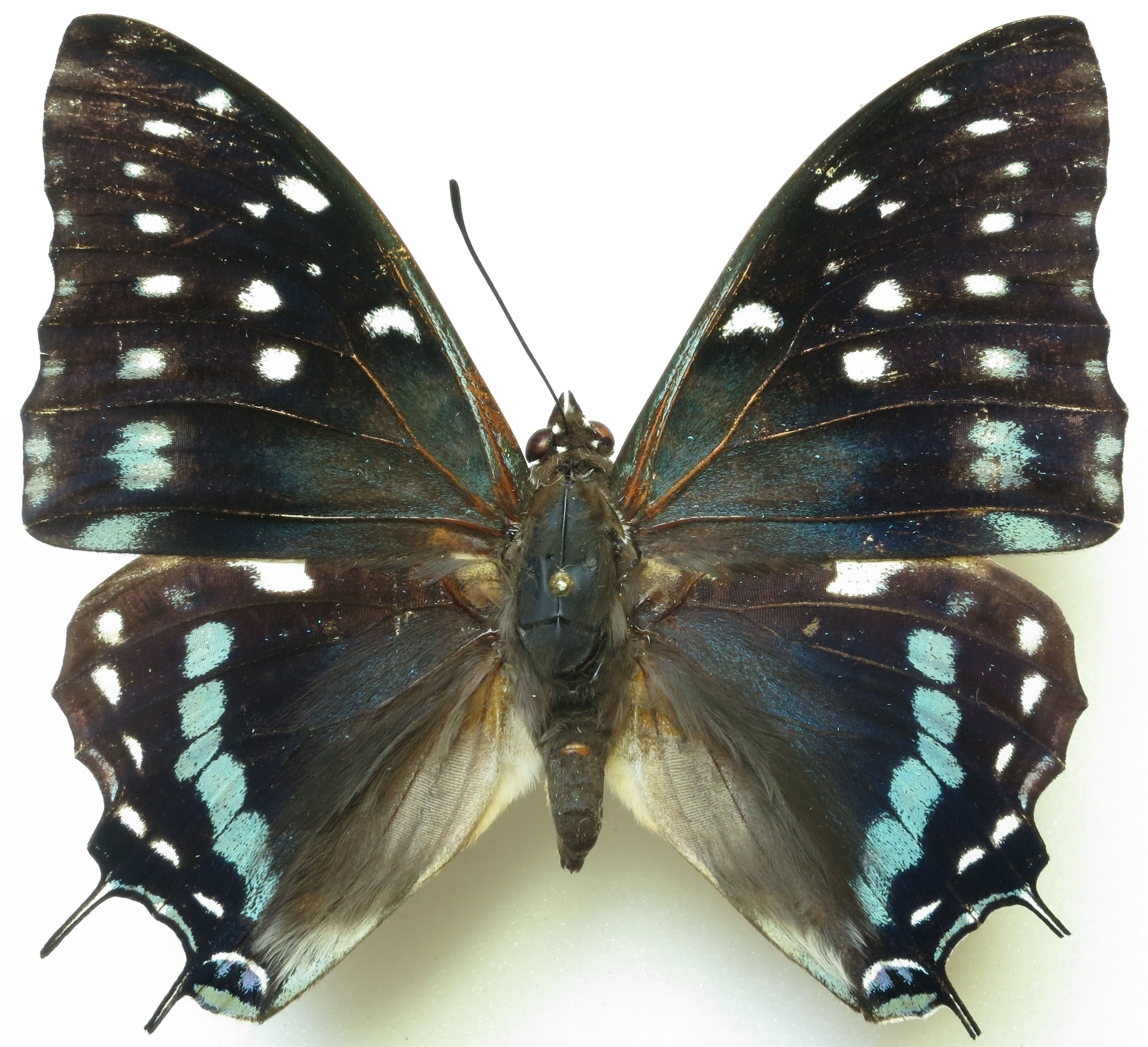
- C. e. etesipe from Cameroon - dorsal view
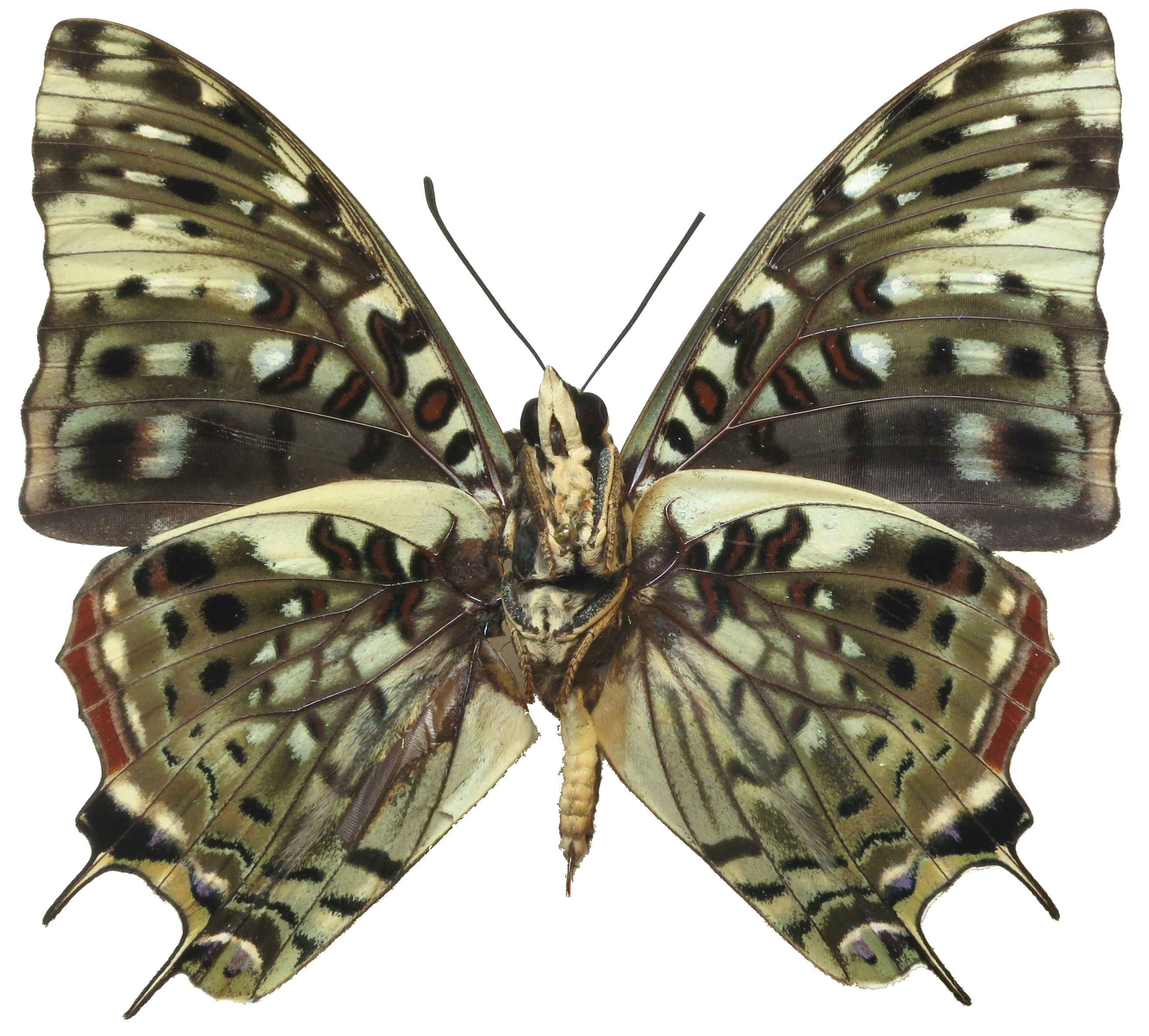
- C. e. etesipe from Cameroon - ventral view

Scientific classification
- Kingdom: Animalia
- Phylum: Arthropoda
- Clade: Pancrustacea
- Class: Insecta
- Order: Lepidoptera
- Family: Nymphalidae
- Genus: Charaxes
- Species: C. etesipe

Binomial name
- Charaxes etesipe (Godart, 1824)

Synonyms
- Nymphalis etesipe Godart, 1824; Nymphalis etheta Godart, 1824; Charaxes etesipe etesipe f. castoroides Poulton, 1926; Charaxes etesipe f. caeruleotincta Carpenter, 1945; Charaxes tavetensis Rothschild, 1894

= Charaxes etesipe =

Species of butterfly

Charaxes etesipe, the savannah charaxes or scarce forest emperor, is a butterfly of the family Nymphalidae.

== Description ==
The wingspan is 35–38 millimetres (1.4–1.5 in) for male. The females are larger, reaching 37–45 millimetres (1.5–1.8 in).

The uppersides of the forewings are blackish blue with a greenish tint. The outer margin are generally denticulate (tooth like), with a series of white discal spots. In the hindwings of both sexes there are short tails and a complete series of large pale blue patches. The undersides of the wings are variegated with cream and drab colours. A full description is given by Rothschild, W. And Jordan, K., 1900 Novitates Zoologicae Volume 7:455-457 page 428-429 (for terms see Novitates Zoologicae Volume 5:545-601 ) Seitz-The transverse band on the upperside of the hindwing in the male is blue and placed beyond the middle of the wing, in the female it is at least partly white and placed about at the middle. — etesipe Godt. male The transverse band of the forewing is narrow, entirely broken up into spots, only those in cellules la, lb and 2 are blue, the others white, and placed near the distal margin; white spots are also present in the basal part of cellules 2—6 and at the apex of the cell; the median band on the upperside of the hindwing is only 2–3 mm. in breadth and is also broken up into spots. Female- The transverse band on the upper surface is broad and white, the markings at the distal margin of the hindwing indistinct. Sierra Leone to Angola and Unyoro. — abyssinicus Rothsch. differs from the type-form in having the blue transverse band of the hindwing in the male continuous and about 5 mm. in breadth; the blue spot in cellules la and lb on the upperside of the forewing are also larger than in etesipe; the female is unknown. Abyssinia. — tavetensis Rothsch. Male : he blue transverse band on the upperside of the hindwing is posteriorly continuous and very broad (7—8mm. in breadth in cellule 2), but anteriorly much narrowed and broken up into spots; the blue spots in cellules la and 1 b of the forewing are larger than in etesipe, but smaller than in abyssinicus. The female is very similar to that of typical etesipe, but somewhat smaller and with more distinct markings at the distal margin of the hindwing above. East Africa from Nyassaland to Taveta in British East Africa.

Torben Larsen developed a species numbering system for his 2005 publication Butterflies of West Africa. This species is #754. The 'Larsen' numbers have since been used with permission in A Sharp Eye on Butterflies of Ghana.

== Biology ==
Adults are on wing from August to October and from March to June. There are two generations per year.

The larvae of subspecies tavetensis feed on Afzelia quanzensis, Dalbergia nitidula, Securidaca longipeduncularis and Margaritaria discoidea. Other subspecies have been recorded on Entada and Afzelia quanzensis.

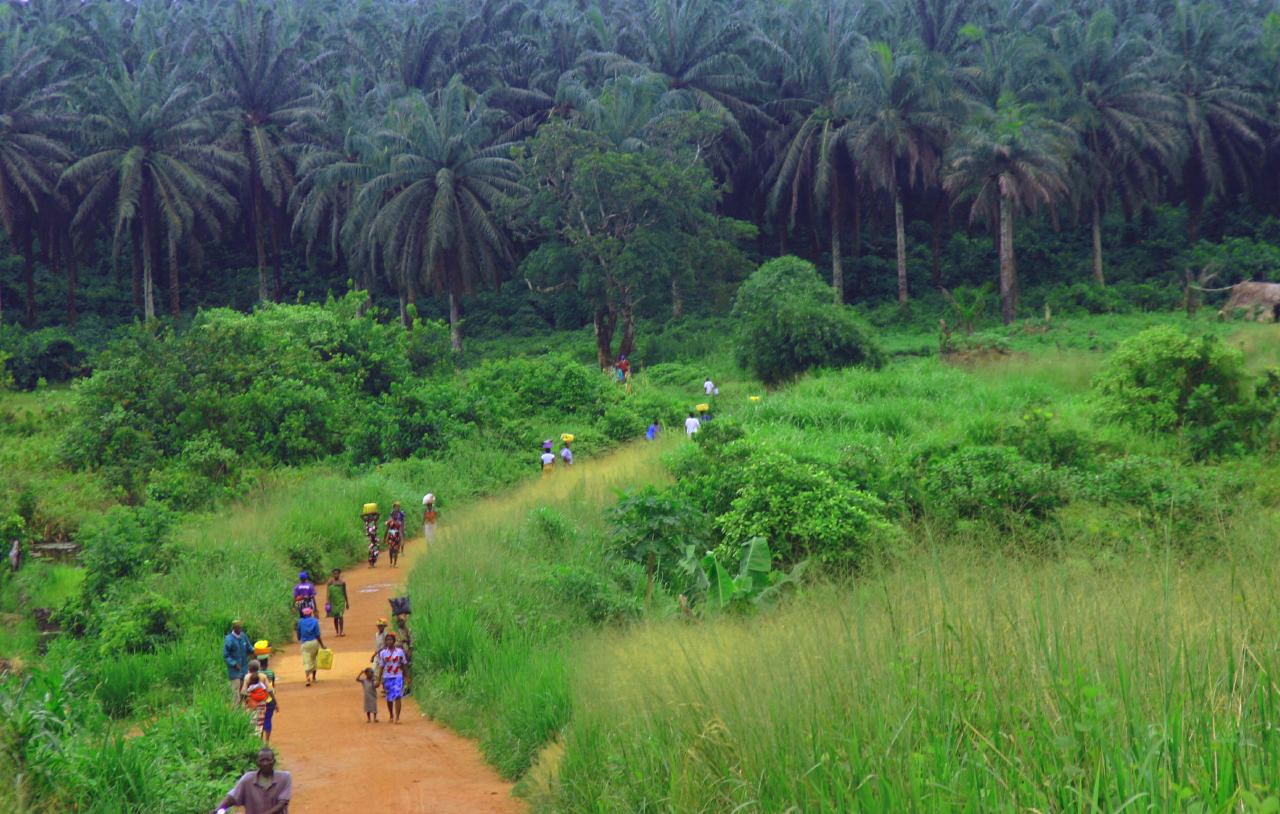
Habitat in Sierra Leone

Notes on the biology of etesipe are given by Kielland, J. (1990) and Larsen, T.B. (2005)

== Distribution ==
This species can be found in tropical east and west Africa and in Madagascar in a mosaic of habitats but mainly in Afrotropical forest.

== Taxonomy ==
Kielland regards to be closely related to Charaxes penricei and Charaxes cacuthis and considers tavetensis as a species distinct from etesipe and regards pemba and shaba as subspecies of tavetensis . Charaxes etesipe is a member of the species group Charaxes etesipe

The clade members are:

- Charaxes etesipe nominate
- Charaxes penricei
- Charaxes achaemenes
- Charaxes paradoxa
- Charaxes cacuthis
- Charaxes bwete
- Charaxes cristalensis

== Subspecies ==
- C. e. etesipe (Sierra Leone, Ivory Coast, Liberia, Benin, Togo, Ghana, Nigeria, southern Chad, Cameroon, southern Sudan, northern Angola, Uganda, northern Kenya)
- C. e. abyssinicus Rothschild & Jordan, 1900 (Ethiopia (west of Rift)
- C. e. gordoni van Someren, 1935 (Kenya (north-eastern side of Mount Kenya))
- C. e. hercules Turlin & Lequeux, 2002 (Uganda)
- C. e. patrizii Storace, 1949(Somalia)
- C. e. pemba van Someren, 1966 . (Pemba Island)
- C. e. shaba Berger, 1981 (Zaire (Shaba))
- C. e. tavetensis Rothschild, 1894 (Malawi, Mozambique, coast of Kenya, Tanzania, South Africa) perhaps a species

=== Subspecies gallery ===
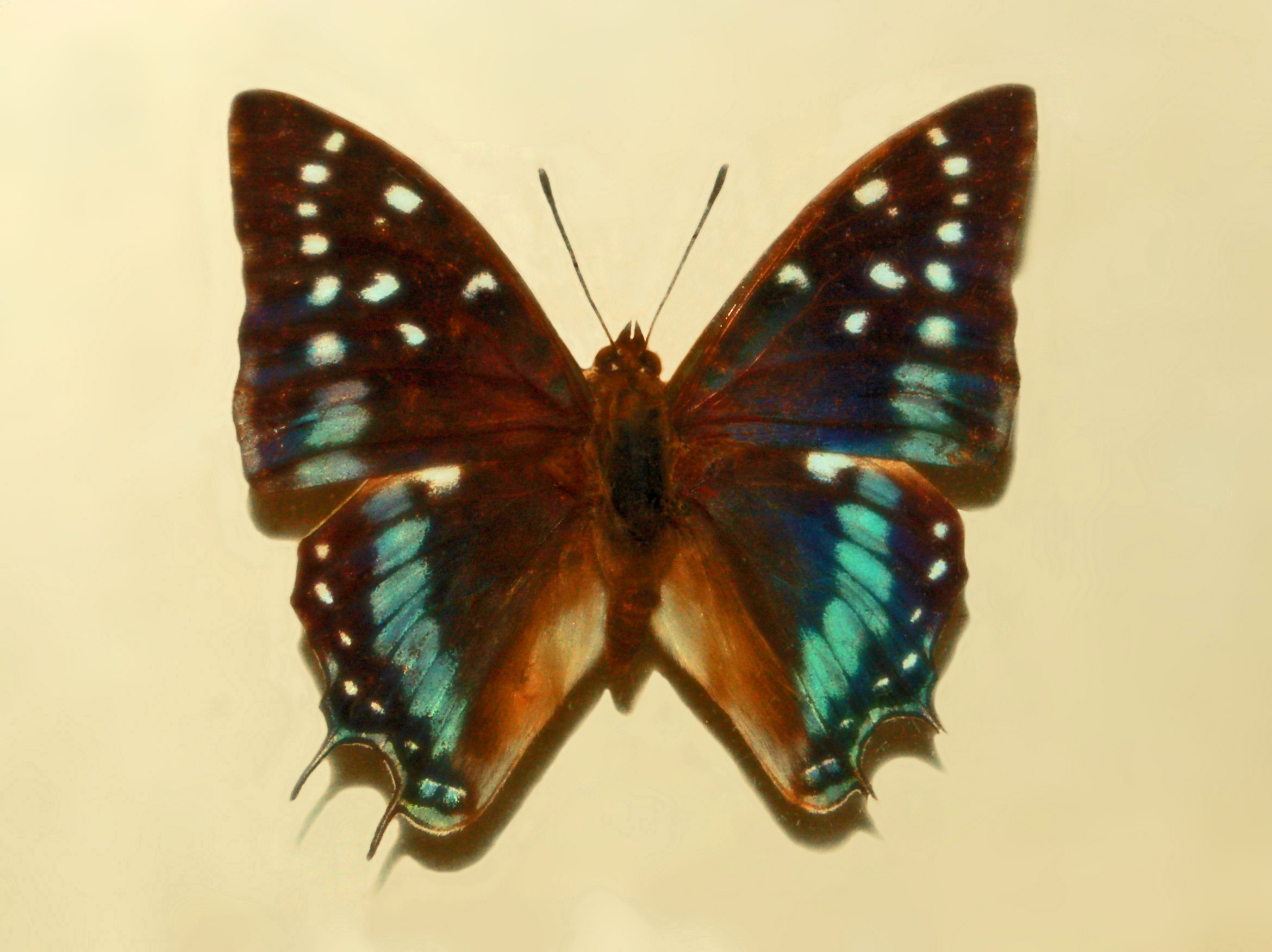
C. e. abyssinicus from Ethiopia

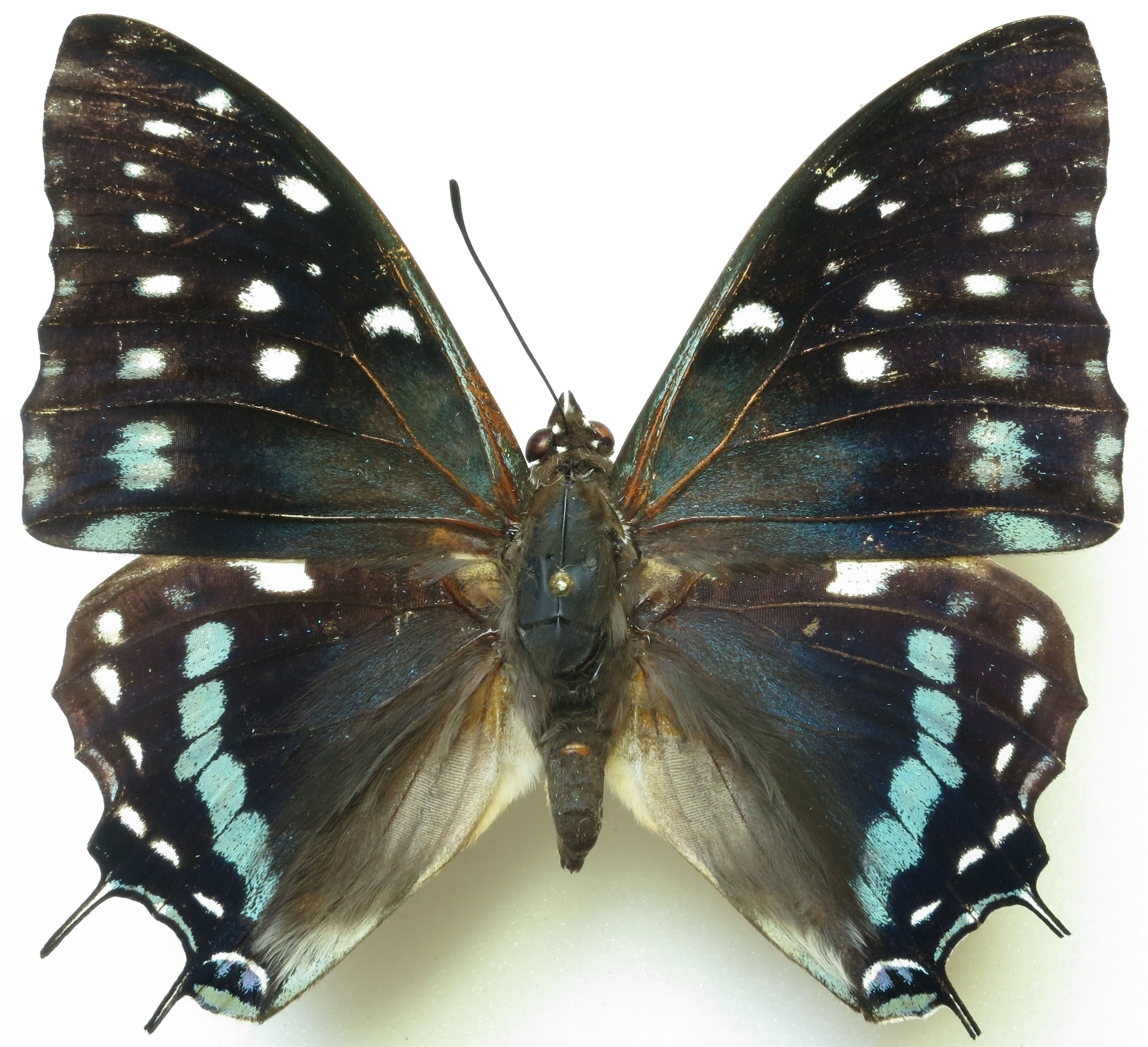
C. e. etesipe from Cameroon - dorsal view

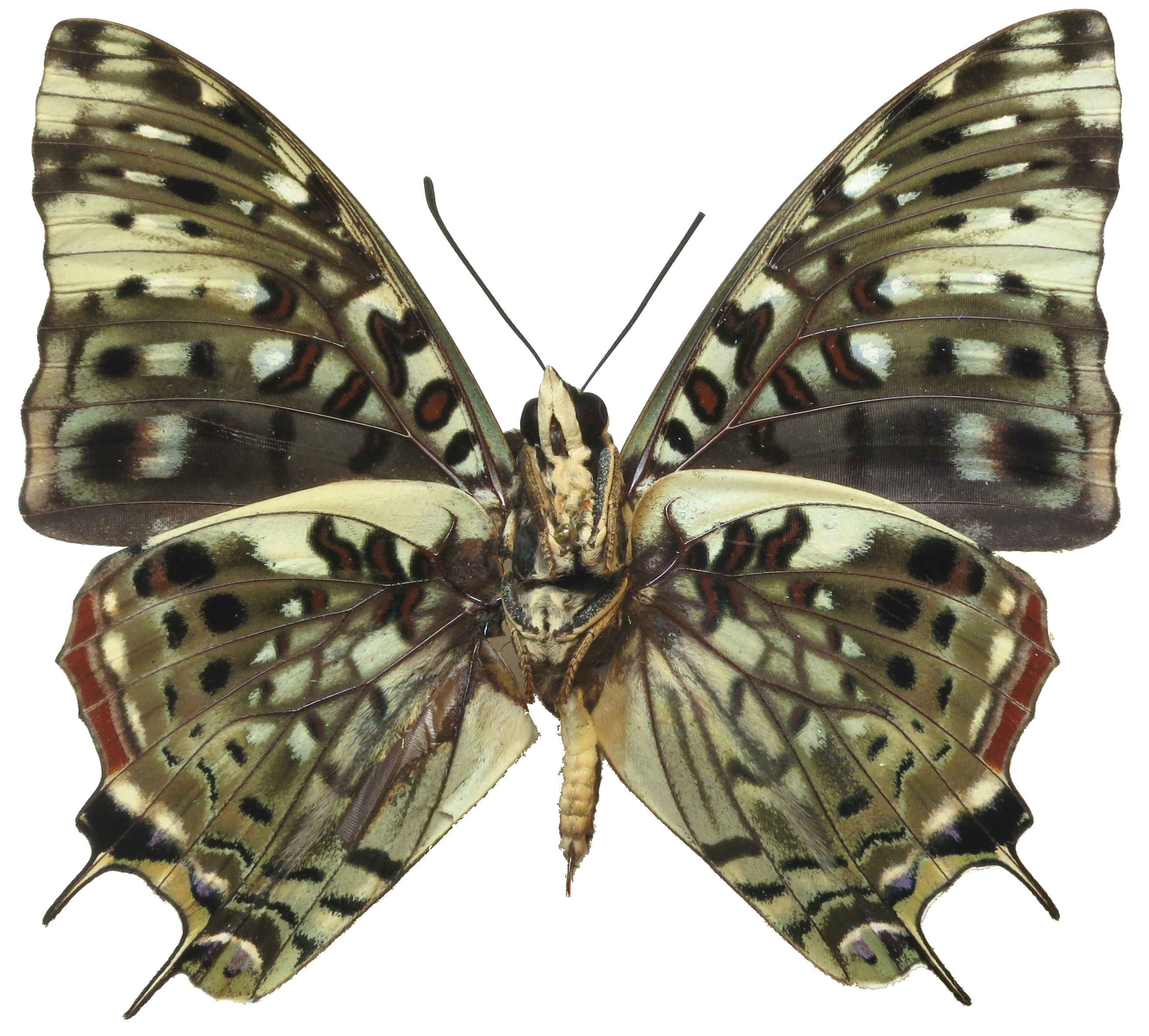
C. e. etesipe from Cameroon - ventral view
