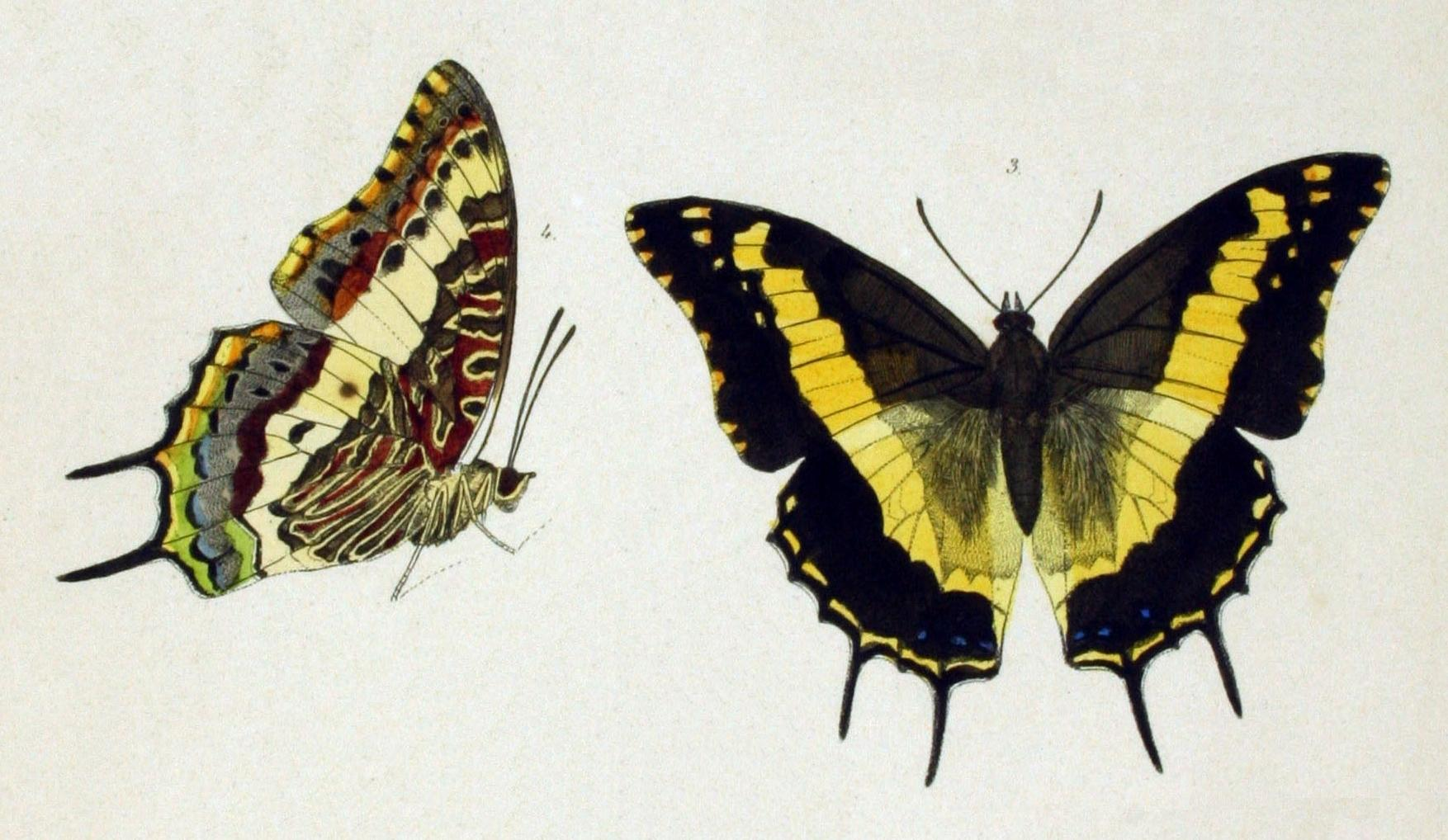

Scientific classification
- Kingdom: Animalia
- Phylum: Arthropoda
- Clade: Pancrustacea
- Class: Insecta
- Order: Lepidoptera
- Family: Nymphalidae
- Genus: Charaxes
- Species: C. hansali

Binomial name
- Charaxes hansali Felder, 1867

Synonyms
- Charaxes hansalii; Charaxes achaemenes ab. minor Storace, 1948; Charaxes hansalii kulalensis van Someren, 1971

= Charaxes hansali =

Cream-banded charaxes

Species of butterfly

Charaxes hansali, the cream-banded charaxes, is a butterfly in the family Nymphalidae. It is found in Tanzania, Rwanda, Kenya, Uganda, Sudan, Ethiopia, Somalia, Saudi Arabia, Yemen and Oman.

== Description ==
Ch. hansali Fldr. closely approaches Charaxes pelias in the markings, but has a broad light yellow discal band extending to the inner margin of the hindwing and the basal part of the upper surface is darker black-brown; the distal yellow spots in cellules 3—7 of the forewing are small and completely separated from the band; the yellow spots at the distal margin of the hindwing are streak-like and completely separated from the distal margin by the thick black marginal line; the tails are longer than in pelias; the light-bordered spots in the basal part of the under surface have grey centres, as in pelias. Abyssinia and the adjacent parts of Somaliland. — baringana Rothsch. only differs from the type-form in the narrower discal band of the upper surface and the free red-brown spots at the distal side of the median band on the hindwing beneath. At Lake Baringo in British East Africa.

== Biology ==
The habitat consists of arid savanna.

The larvae feed on Salvadora persica, Osyris lanceolata, Colpoon compressum; and Dobera glabra.Notes on the biology of hansali are provided by

== Subspecies ==
- C. h. hansali (northern, eastern and south-eastern Ethiopia, Somalia: north to the Wagga Mountains)
- C. h. arabica Riley, 1931 (Oman)
- C. h. baringana Rothschild, 1905 (Tanzania: southern shores of Lake Victoria, eastern Rwanda, Kenya, northern Uganda, southern Sudan, southern Ethiopia)
- C. h. kulalae van Someren, 1975 (Kenya: Mount Kulal, Ethiopia: south to Nighelli)
- C. h. yemeni Turlin, 1998 (Yemen)

== Related species ==
Historical attempts to assemble a cluster of presumably related species into a "Charaxes jasius Group" have not been wholly convincing. More recent taxonomic revision, corroborated by phylogenetic research, allow a more rational grouping congruent with cladistic relationships. Within a well-populated clade of 27 related species sharing a common ancestor approximately 16 mya during the Miocene, 26 are now considered together as The jasius Group. One of the two lineages forms a robust clade of seven species sharing a common ancestor approximately 2-3 mya, i.e. during the Pliocene, and are considered as the jasius subgroup.

The jasius Group (26 Species)

Clade 1: jasius subgroup (7 species):

- Charaxes jasius
- Charaxes epijasius [stat.rev.2005]
- Charaxes legeri
- Charaxes saturnus [stat.rev.2005]
- Charaxes pelias
- Charaxes castor
- Charaxes hansali

Clade 2: contains the well-populated three additional subgroups (19 species) of the jasius Group, called the brutus, pollux, and eudoxus subgroups. Further exploration of the phylogenetic relationships amongst existing Charaxes taxa is required to improve clarity.
