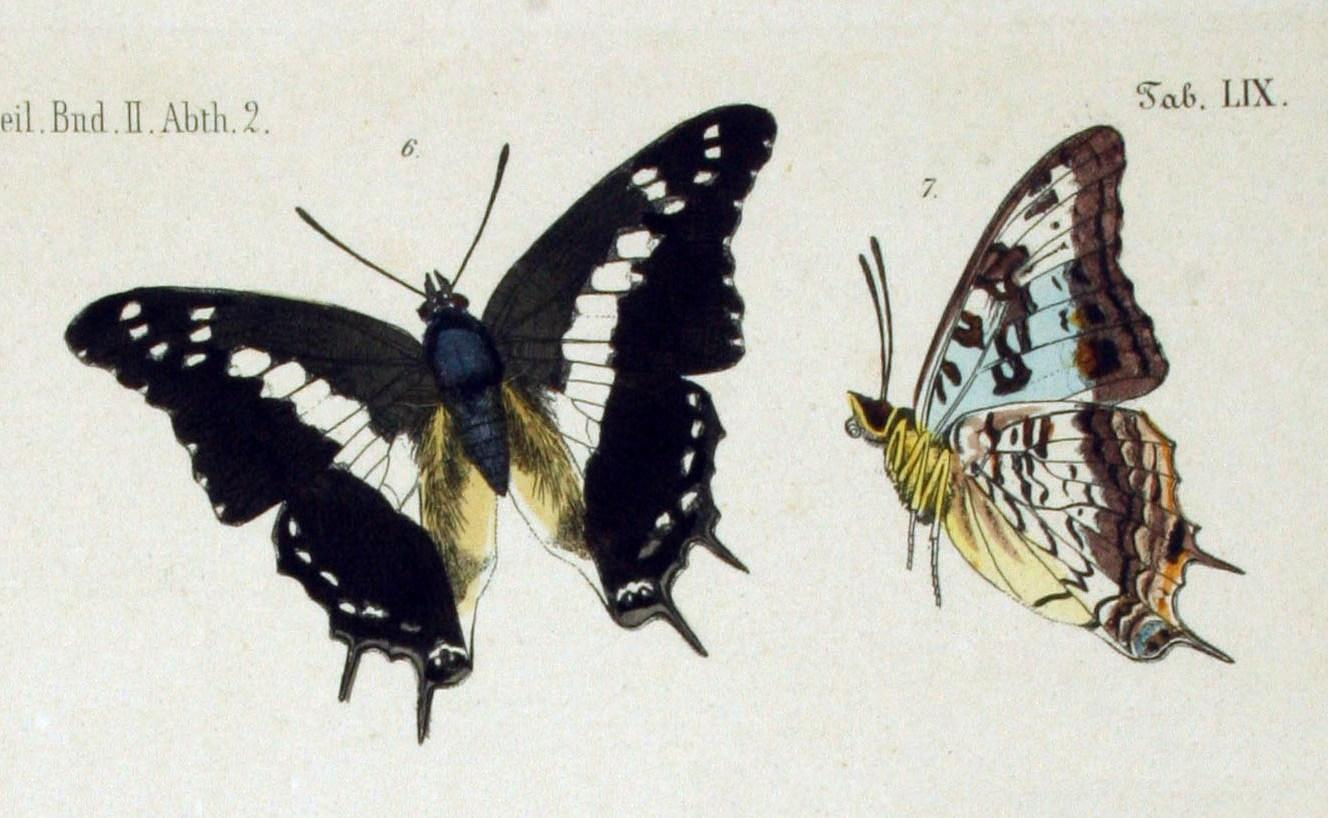
- Male upper and underside
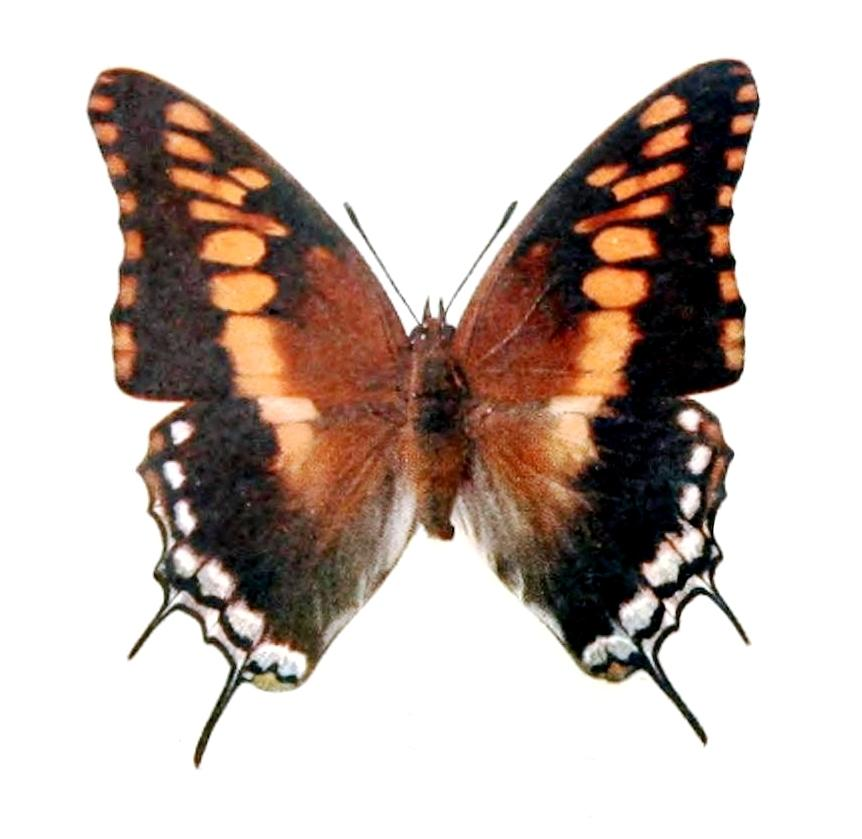
- Female upperside

Scientific classification
- Kingdom: Animalia
- Phylum: Arthropoda
- Clade: Pancrustacea
- Class: Insecta
- Order: Lepidoptera
- Family: Nymphalidae
- Genus: Charaxes
- Species: C. achaemenes

Binomial name
- Charaxes achaemenes C. & R. Felder, 1867

Synonyms
- Charaxes achaemenes fasciatus Suffert, 1904; Charaxes achaemenes achaemenes ab. glaucomaculata Cordeiro, 1990; Charaxes achaemenes f. monticola Joicey and Talbot, 1925; Charaxes jocaste Butler, 1869; Charaxes achaemenes ab. minor Storace, 1948; Charaxes achaemenes f. erythraea Storace, 1948

= Charaxes achaemenes =

Bushveld emperor

Species of butterfly

Charaxes achaemenes, the bushveld emperor or bush charaxes, is a butterfly of the family Nymphalidae found across Africa.

== Description ==
The wingspan is 55–60 millimetres (2.2–2.4 in) in males and 60–70 millimetres (2.4–2.8 in) in females.

The wings in the male above black, at the base black-grey with a common white transverse band, which is placed on the forewing about the middle, on the hindwing somewhat before the middle, hence in the latter not covering the base of cellule 3; the median band forms on the forewing single quadrate spots in cellules la—3 and 7 and two widely separated spots in each cellule from 4 to 6; on the hindwing it terminates at vein 2. The forewing has small, rounded spots at the ends of the interneural folds and the hindwing whitish marginal streaks, more or less tinged with blue, in cellules lc-5 and similar submarginal streaks in cellules lc—7.

The undersurface is marked almost as in etesipe, but has a lighter ground-colour, finer transverse streaks and a rather sharply defined whitish median band. The female differs in having the basal part of the upper surface yellow-brown and the median band light orange-yellow; the marginal spots on the upperside of the forewing are larger, streak-like and red-yellow, the marginal and submarginal spots of the hindwing are larger and the marginal spots distinct in cellules 6 and 7 also, but there red-yellow.

Above the female strongly recalls Ch. saturnus and the female of Ch. guderiana, but these species are quite differently marked beneath. ab. fasciatus Suff, only differs in the much larger submarginal spots on the upperside of the hindwing. Mhonda in German East Africa.

A full description is given by Walter Rothschild and Karl Jordan (1900). Novitates Zoologicae Volume 7:287-524. page 460-463 (for terms see Novitates Zoologicae Volume 5:545-601 ) The female is similar to both sexes of Charaxes saturnus and to the female of Charaxes guderiana.

Torben Larsen developed a species numbering system for his 2005 publication Butterflies of West Africa. The subspecies atlantica is #755. The 'Larsen' numbers have since been used with permission in A Sharp Eye on Butterflies of Ghana.

== Biology ==
Flight period is year-round. The habitat is dry savanna and deciduous woodland.

Larvae feed on Pterocarpus rotundifolius, Pterocarpus angolensis, Xanthocercis zambesiaca, Dalbergia boehmii, Piliostigma thonningii, Pterocarpus erinaceus, Dalbergia nitidula, and Brachystegia spiciformis. Notes on the biology of achaemenes are gien by Pringle et al (1994), Larsen, T.B. (1991), Larsen, T.B. (2005) and Kielland, J. (1990). .

== Subspecies ==
Listed alphabetically:

- C. a. achaemenes C. & R. Felder, 1867 (eastern Kenya, Tanzania, south-eastern Democratic Republic of the Congo, south-eastern Angola, Malawi, Zambia, Mozambique, Zimbabwe, Botswana, Namibia, South Africa, Eswatini)
- C. a. atlantica van Someren, 1970 (Senegal, Gambia, Guinea, Ivory Coast, Ghana, Togo)
- C. a. monticola Joicey & Talbot, 1925 (northern Nigeria, northern Cameroon, Central African Republic, Uganda, Democratic Republic of the Congo: Ituri, western Ethiopia, Sudan, Kenya: west of the Rift Valley)

== Taxonomy ==
Charaxes achaemenes is a member of the species group Charaxes etesipe

The clade members are

- Charaxes etesipe nominate
- Charaxes penricei
- Charaxes achaemenes
- Charaxes paradoxa
- Charaxes cacuthis
- Charaxes bwete
- Charaxes cristalensis

== See also ==
- List of national parks in Africa
- Protected areas of Cameroon
- Natural history of Africa
