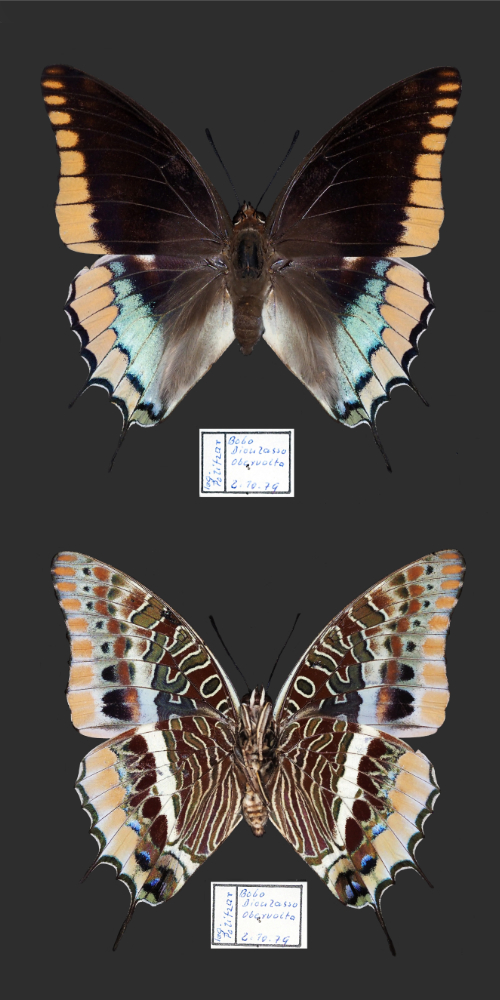
- C. epijasius, Bobo-Duiasso, Burkina Faso 1979 Female

Conservation status
- Least Concern (IUCN 3.1)

Scientific classification
- Kingdom: Animalia
- Phylum: Arthropoda
- Clade: Pancrustacea
- Class: Insecta
- Order: Lepidoptera
- Family: Nymphalidae
- Genus: Charaxes
- Species: C. epijasius

Binomial name
- Charaxes epijasius (Reiche, 1850.

Synonyms
- Charaxes epijasius maculatus Suffert, 1904; Charaxes epijasius f. murina Le Cerf, 1923; Charaxes epijasius f. feisthameli Le Cerf, 1923; Charaxes pelias ab. liberiae Le Cerf, 1923; Charaxes pelias liberiae Poulton, 1926; Charaxes jasius epijasius f. aeson Stoneham, 1960; Charaxes jasius epijasius f. plutus Stoneham, 1960; Charaxes jasius epijasius f. alcimede Stoneham, 1960; Charaxes jasius epijasius var. melas van Someren, 1963; Charaxes jasius epijasius f. aesonius Stoneham, 1964

= Charaxes epijasius =

Species of butterfly

Charaxes epijasius, the cream-bordered charaxes or Sahel charaxes, is a butterfly in the family Nymphalidae. It flies through most of the Savannah of the Afrotropical realm except southern Africa.

== Description ==
Charaxes epijasius is a medium to large butterfly. West African and Ethiopian examples tend to be smaller than more central and eastern African specimens. The male has a wingspan of 62–84 mm in West Africa, up to 80-95mm further east, females larger up to 95-102mm. Each hindwing bears two tails, characteristic of most species of the genus, which tend to curve slightly towards each other to a variable degree. The upperside ground colour of the wings is very dark brownish-black, with a slight purplish bloom. Forewing sometimes with suggestion of slightly lighter discal bars, usually with no post-discal spots on the forewing, though sometimes one or two near the costa, often faint; hindwing with pale whitish-yellow patch near costal border, dusted with blackish scales; admarginal outer band of both wings light golden-yellow colour, divided by black-scaled veins. Hindwing has a post-discal broad wedge of bright sky blue clearly demarcated from the admarginal yellow by a well-defined black scalloped border. The underside has a characteristic mosaic appearance, in common with other members of the Charaxes jasius species Group, traversed by a jumble of bands and of brown, reddish, and grey-blackish patches, all edged with a filigree of white. Beyond the inner mosaic, a white complete discal band bridges across fore- to hindwings, tapering down towards the forewing costa. The outer orange marginal coloration is present on the underside also, whitish stripes are evident within the marginal border, above each greyish vein. The female resembles the male but is larger.

=== Type ===
The type location is Senegal.

=== Hybridisation ===
Where C. saturnus is sympatric with Charaxes epijasius[stat.rev.2005], over an extensive zone of overlap, the two species hybridize regularly, producing highly variable transitional specimens (C. saturnus x C. epijasius). The distribution range of hybrid forms extends from Ethiopia to Western Kenya & Northern Tanzania. The variable hybrid forms have historically been named as harrisoni, saturnalis, and pagenstecheri. Observation of hybrid forms in Tanzania, as an example, beyond the recognised range of C. epijasius, strongly indicates that the hybrid forms may exist as fertile hybrids, at a lower prevalence than the relatively more stable phenotype of C. saturnus. More detailed phylogenetic research and breeding studies are required to elucidate further the relationships between the two species and their intermediate hybrid phenotypes, and the degree of fertility exhibited amongst their highly variable hybrid forms.

=== Subspecies ===
- C. epijasius epijasius has a consistent unmistakeable appearance across its distribution. Wingspan is regionally variable to a degree. No subspecies are known.

The Charaxini taxa harrisoni, saturnalis, and pagenstecheri are now thought to be at least partially fertile hybrid variable phenotypes of (C. saturnus x C. epijasius). This suggests that evolutionary divergence to fully stable species separation between C. epijasius and C. saturnus is not complete.

Torben Larsen developed a species numbering system for his 2005 publication Butterflies of West Africa. This species is #734. The 'Larsen' numbers have since been used with permission in A Sharp Eye on Butterflies of Ghana.

=== Related species ===
Historical attempts to assemble a cluster of presumably related species into a "Charaxes jasius Group" have not been wholly convincing. More recent taxonomic revision, corroborated by phylogenetic research, allow a more rational grouping congruent with cladistic relationships. Within a well-populated clade of 27 related species sharing a common ancestor approximately 16 mya during the Miocene, 26 are now considered together as The jasius Group. One of the two lineages forms a robust clade of seven species sharing a common ancestor approximately 2-3 mya, i.e. during the Pliocene, and are considered as the jasius subgroup.

The jasius Group (26 Species).

Clade 1: jasius subgroup (7 species):

- Charaxes jasius
- Charaxes epijasius [stat.rev.2005]
- Charaxes legeri
- Charaxes saturnus [stat.rev.2005]
- Charaxes pelias
- Charaxes castor
- Charaxes hansali

Clade 2: contains the well-populated three additional subgroups (19 species) of the jasius Group, called the brutus, pollux, and eudoxus subgroups. Further exploration of the phylogenetic relationships amongst existing Charaxes taxa is required to improve clarity.

== Distribution ==
This tropical savannah species occurs in Africa from Senegal (the Type Location) in the west, encompassing all the Sub-Saharan savanna belt countries to Nigeria, Cameroun, Central African Republic, across to South Sudan, north-eastwards to Ethiopia, and southwards to Uganda, SW Kenya, and the non-forested margins of N & NE Democratic Republic of Congo. It is not known to occur in Rwanda, Burundi, Tanzania, or any of Southern Africa.

== Habitat ==
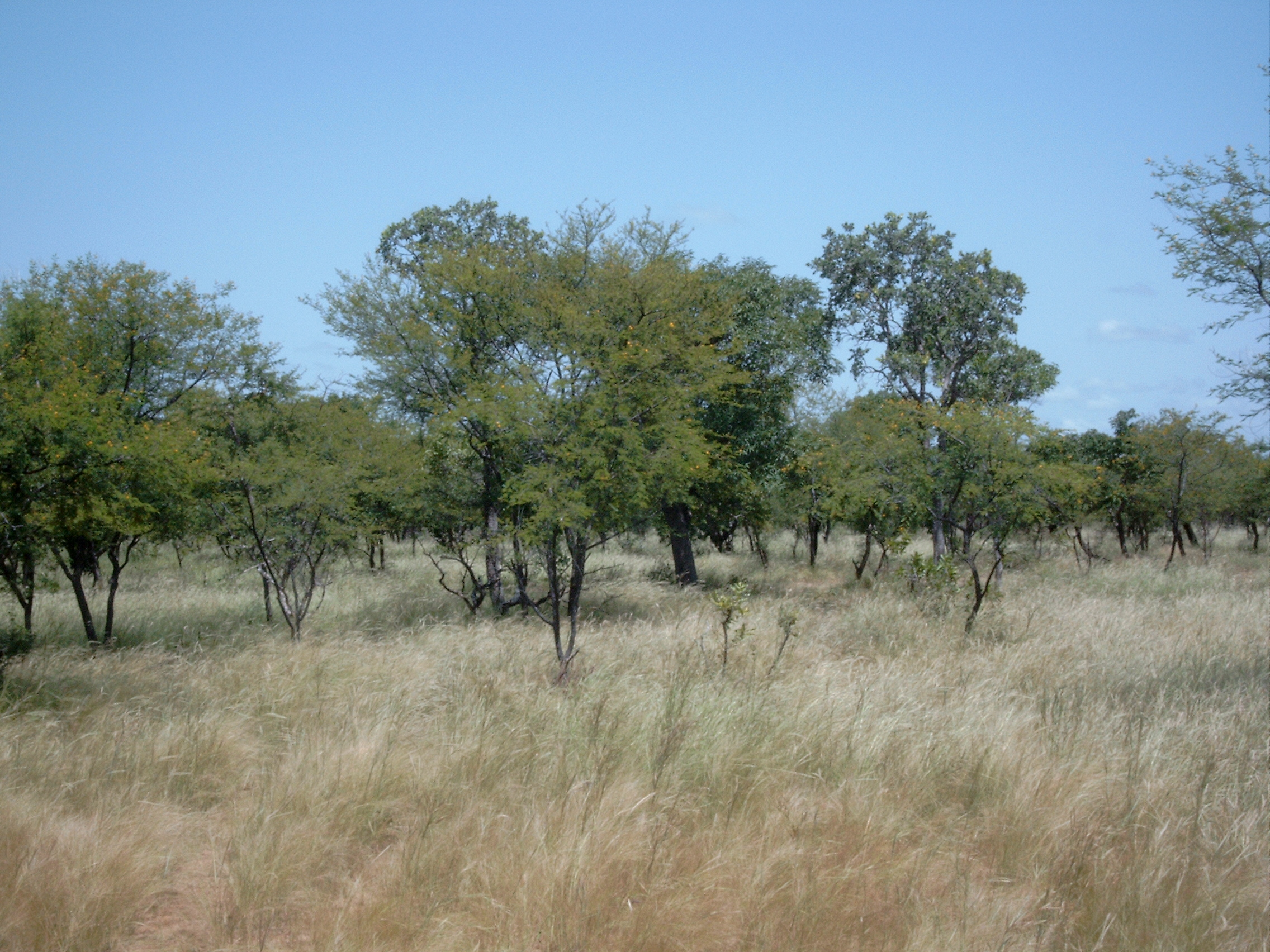
Acacia savanna south of Fada N'Gourma, Burkina Faso

The cream-bordered charaxes is a savanna butterfly, which can exploit open habitats up to forest margins, and can be abundant in favourable habitats. It is not successful in disturbed areas within the forest zone, and is therefore rarely seen in urban garden and park settings. It occurs across the ecological environments of the Guinea savannah, the Sudan Savannah, and has some marginal success in the Sahel.

== Natural history ==
Charaxes epijasius is a fast-flying butterfly that displays male territorial behaviour, particularly hill-topping. Where a vantage point such as an Acacia tree is present, both sexes sometimes can be seen demonstrating a circling display behaviour. The adults of both sexes will suck at tree-sap, often crowded up to twenty at a source, and especially fermenting fruit juices, which can be used to bait the species. Males are also attracted to pungent foul attractants such as decomposing carcasses and animal excrement. C. epijasius can be seen through most of the year, except towards the end of the dry season: in Benin the adult is absent from the end of January to the beginning of April.

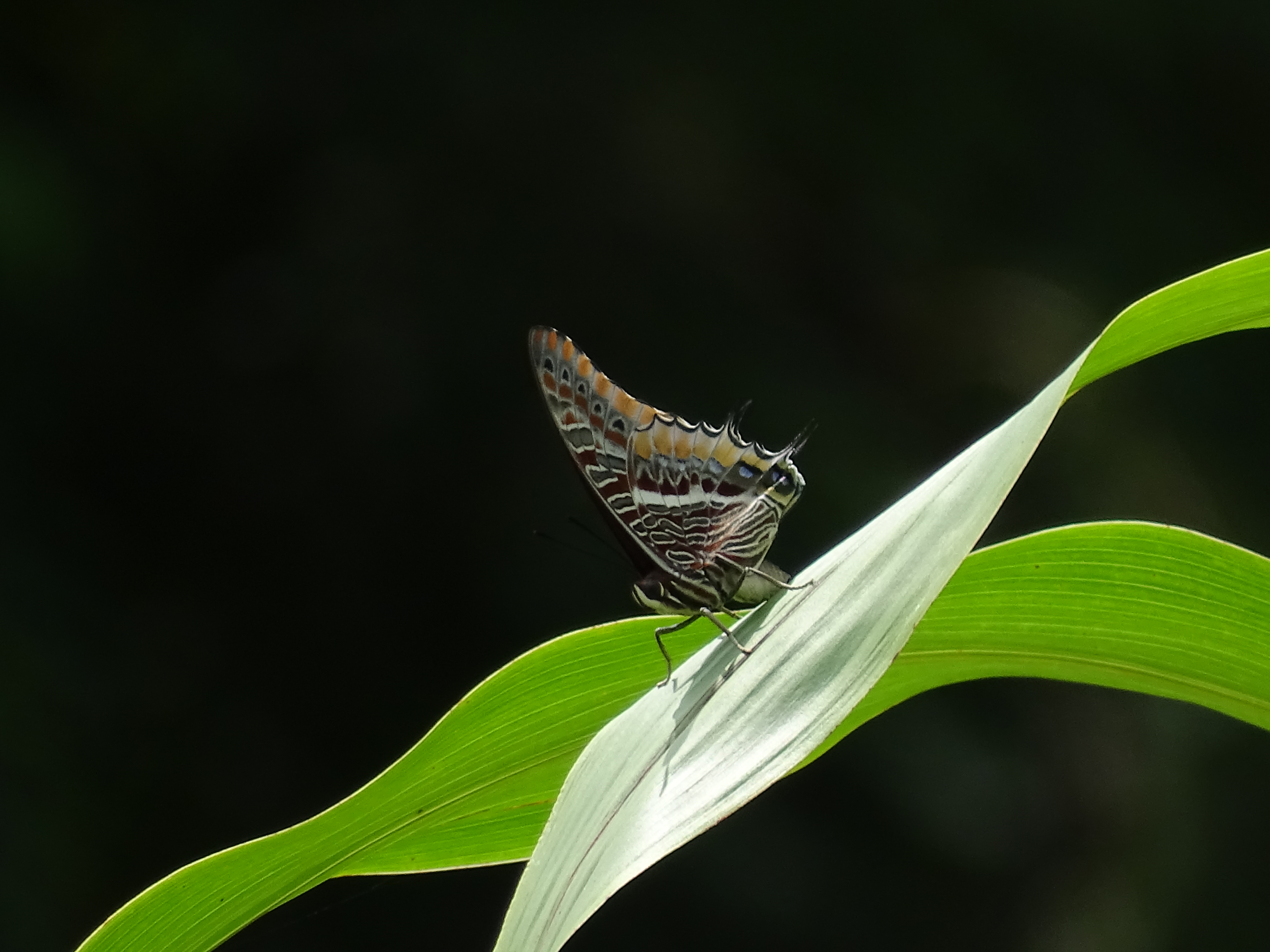
C. epijasius in Pendjari Reserve, NW Benin by Farid Amadou Bahleman

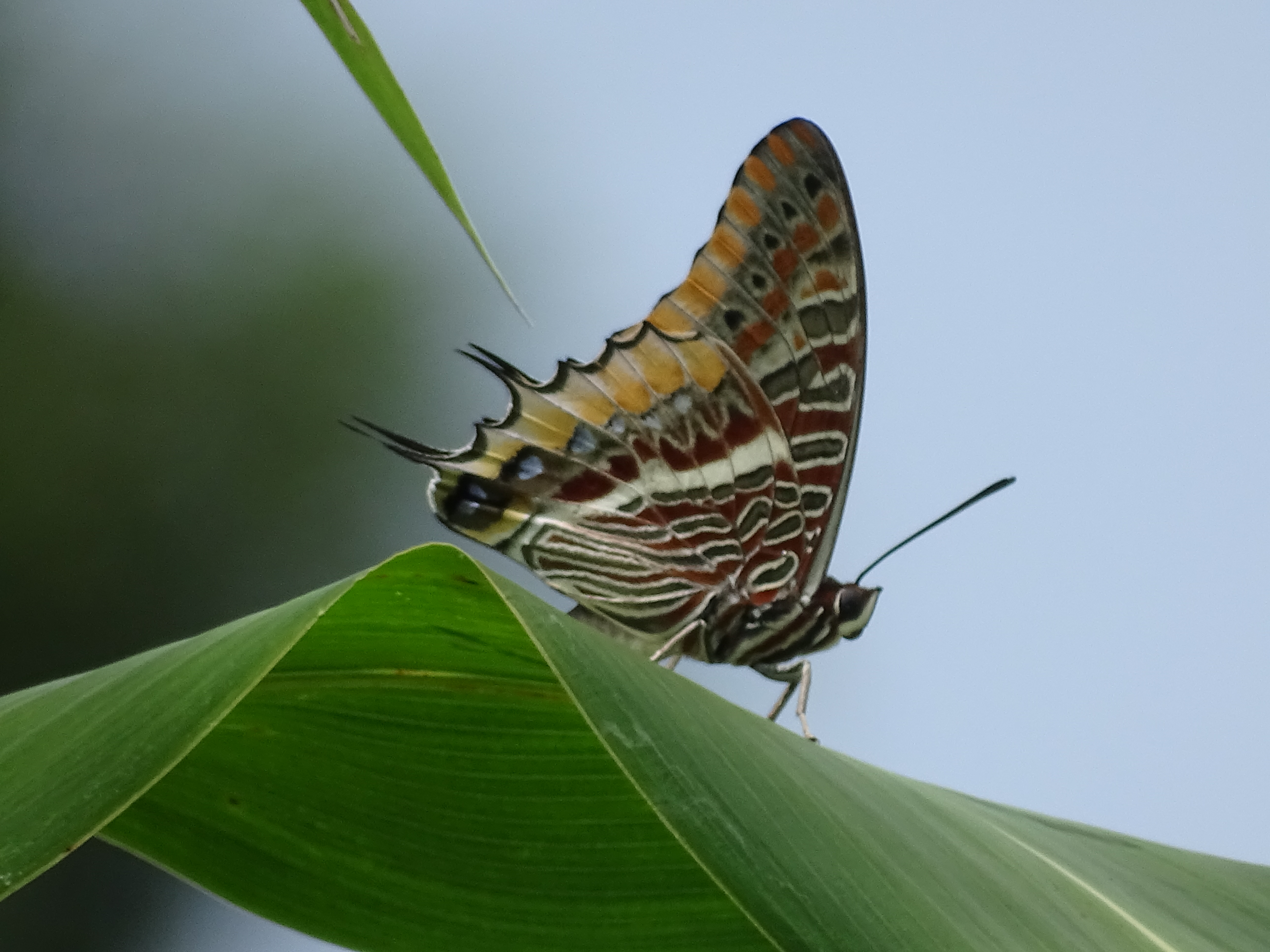
C. epijasius in Pendjari Reserve, NW Benin by Farid Amadou Bahleman

=== Life cycle ===
Life-sized colour plates and detailed description of the larval and pupal stages of C. epijasius and related species were illustrated by Dr. V. G. L. van Someren.

==== Egg ====
Canary yellow eggs, 1.25mm diameter, are laid singly on the leaves or stem of the larval foodplant. They are spherical with slight flattening of the top which has shallow radial fluting. By 48hrs, a fertile egg will develop a brown ring around the top. Shortly prior to hatching at 7–10 days, it changes to olive-yellow with a black head

==== Larva ====
The larva eats the shell immediately after emerging. At first the yellowish olive 1st Instar larva closely resembles that of other species in the jasius subgroup, but after the first moult it is bright emerald green with very fine papillation, which separates it from related species C. castor. It has a yellow lateral line. The facial disc is green. The head bears 4 long pointed pink-tipped horns. The 5th and final larval stage lasts 14–18 days (up to 28 days), when it becomes slightly translucent and ready to pupate.

==== Pupa ====
The well-camouflaged pupa, at 26-28mm, is green with red spiracle dots. It attaches suspended by a silken pad to the underneath of a leaf or stem on the host plant. Emergence takes place at 10 days up to 4 weeks, depending on environmental temperature and humidity. Cool and dry conditions delay emergence.

=== Larval food plants ===
A wide variety of foodplants have been identified including grasses eg Sorghum bicolor (L.) Moench [=S. roxburghii], the West African shrub Lonchocarpus cyanescens (Schumach. & Thonn.) Benth., Cassine spp., the Red Spikethorn shrub & tree Gymnosporia senegalensis (Lam.) Loes., and the African shrub & tree Pleurostylia africana Loes. (Celastraceae).
