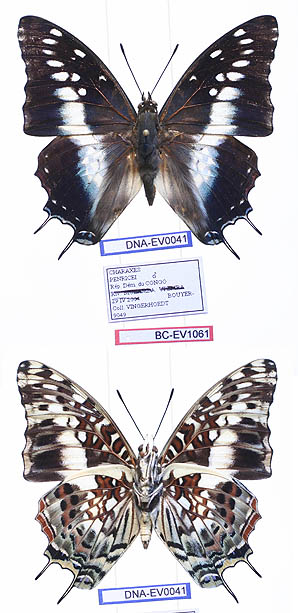

Scientific classification
- Domain: Eukaryota
- Kingdom: Animalia
- Phylum: Arthropoda
- Class: Insecta
- Order: Lepidoptera
- Family: Nymphalidae
- Subfamily: Charaxinae
- Tribe: Charaxini
- Genus: Charaxes
- Species: C. penricei

Binomial name
- Charaxes penricei Rothschild, 1900

Synonyms
- Charaxes peculiaris Lathy, 1906; Charaxes penricei ab. flavus Lathy, 1925; Charaxes penricei penricei ab. paraperpullus White, 1978; Charaxes penricei f. dealbata Joicey and Talbot, 1922; Charaxes penricei tanganyikae f. caerulescens van Someren, 1969

= Charaxes penricei =

Scarce savanna charaxes

Species of butterfly

Charaxes penricei, the scarce savanna charaxes, is a butterfly in the family Nymphalidae. It is found in the Republic of the Congo, Angola, the Democratic Republic of the Congo, Zambia, Tanzania, Malawi and Zimbabwe.

== Description ==
The original description written by Walter Rothschild is on page 460 of Rothschild, W. and Jordan, K. (1898). A monograph of Charaxes and the allied prionopterous genera. Novitates Zoologicae Volume 5:545-601 ; 1899 Volume 6: 220-286 : 1900 Volume 7:287-524. Descriptions and plates (monochrome photos). Seitz- Ch. penricei Rothsch. Male: the under surface is marked almost as in etesipe; but above the transverse band, as in the female of etesipe, is placed nearly in the middle of the hindwing and further from the distal margin than in etesipe male; it is white or bluish white and from vein 2 of the hindwing to vein 2 of the forewing broad and continuous, then broken up into small spots, two each in cellules 2, 3 and 6 and one each in cellules 4, 5, 7 and in the cell; the ground-colour of the upper surface is bluish black. The female is unknown. This rare species has hitherto only been found in Angola. — peculiaris Lathy only differs from the type-form in having the black colour replaced by greenish. Rhodesia. Similar to Charaxes etesipe but upperside median band further from the wing margins

== Subspecies ==
- Charaxes penricei penricei (eastern Angola, Democratic Republic of the Congo, Zambia, southern Tanzania, Malawi, eastern Zimbabwe)
- Charaxes penricei dealbata van Someren, 1966(Congo, north-western Angola, western Democratic Republic of the Congo)
- Charaxes penricei tanganyikae van Someren, 1966 (western Tanzania)

== Biology ==
The habitat consists of savanna, especially Brachystegia woodland (Miombo).

The larvae feed on Entada species and Securidaca longipedunculata.

Notes on the biology of penricei are given by Pringle et al (1994). .

== Taxonomy ==
Closely related to Charaxes cacuthis and Charaxes etesipe

Charaxes penricei is a member of the species group Charaxes etesipe.

The clade members are:

- Charaxes etesipe (nominate)
- Charaxes penricei
- Charaxes achaemenes
- Charaxes paradoxa
- Charaxes cacuthis
- Charaxes bwete
- Charaxes cristalensis
