= Charaxes paradoxa =

Scientific classification
- Domain: Eukaryota
- Kingdom: Animalia
- Phylum: Arthropoda
- Class: Insecta
- Order: Lepidoptera
- Family: Nymphalidae
- Subfamily: Charaxinae
- Tribe: Charaxini
- Genus: Charaxes
- Species: C. paradoxa

Binomial name
- Charaxes paradoxa Lathy, 1925

Synonyms
- Charaxes etesipe paradoxa Lathy, 1925

Species of butterfly

Charaxes paradoxa is a butterfly in the family Nymphalidae. It is found on Grande Comore. The habitat consists of forests.

The larvae feed on Phyllanthus species.

== Taxonomy ==
Charaxes paradoxa is a member of the species group Charaxes etesipe.

The clade members are:

- Charaxes etesipe, nominate
- Charaxes penricei
- Charaxes achaemenes
- Charaxes paradoxa
- Charaxes cacuthis
- Charaxes bwete
- Charaxes cristalensis
