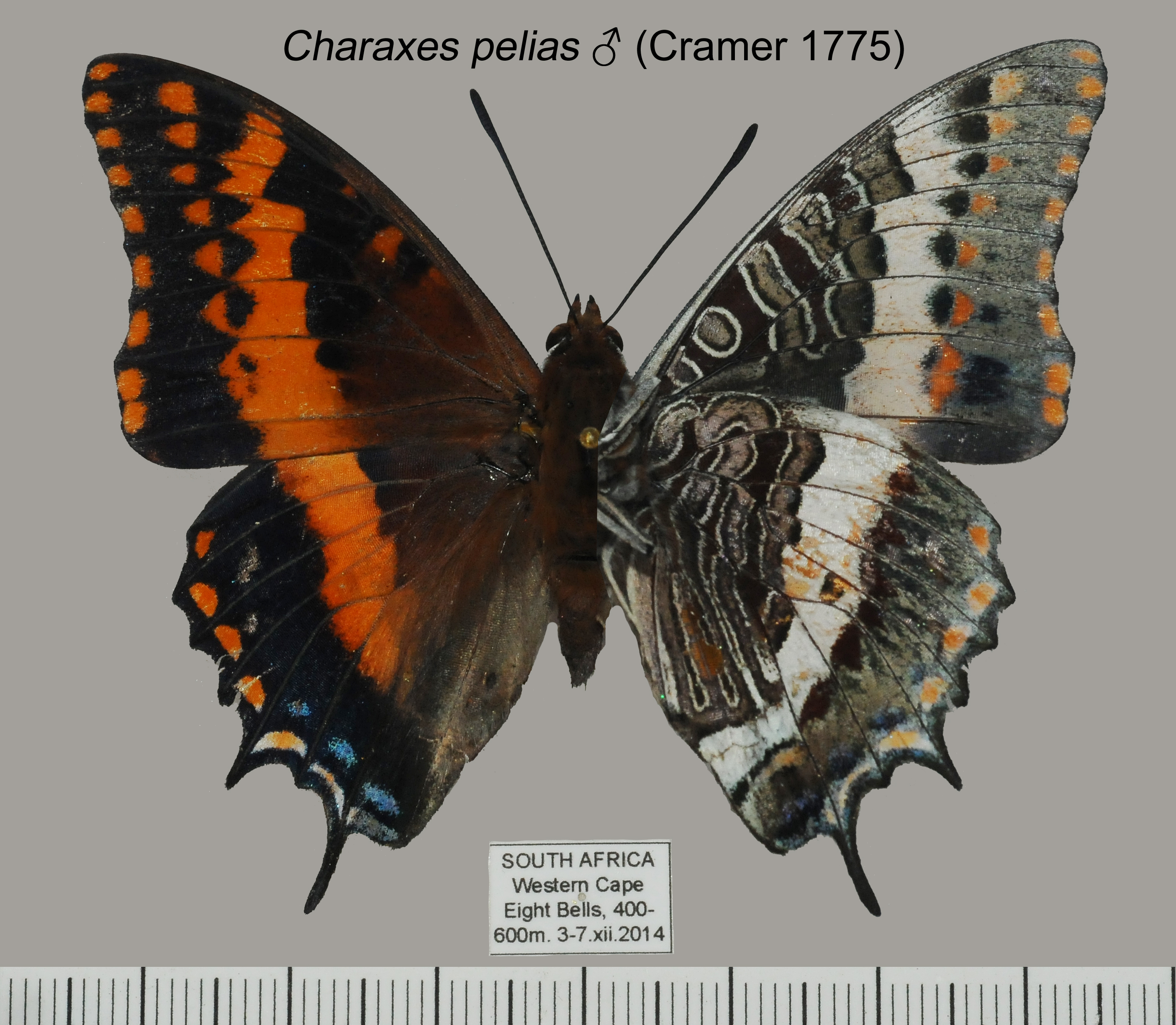
- C. pelias, W. Cape Province, RSA.

Conservation status
- Least Concern (IUCN 3.1)

Scientific classification
- Kingdom: Animalia
- Phylum: Arthropoda
- Class: Insecta
- Order: Lepidoptera
- Family: Nymphalidae
- Subfamily: Charaxinae
- Tribe: Charaxini
- Genus: Charaxes
- Species: C. pelias

Binomial name
- Charaxes pelias (Cramer, [1775])

Synonyms
- Papilio pelias Cramer, [1775]; Eriboea pelopia Hübner, [1819]

= Charaxes pelias =

Protea emperor

Species of butterfly

Charaxes pelias, the protea emperor or protea charaxes, is a butterfly of the family Nymphalidae, and is endemic to the Cape Provinces in South Africa.

== Description ==
The wingspan is 60–70 mm in males and 65–75 mm in females. The hindwings each bear two tails, the upper tail considerably shorter than the lower. The hindwing typically exhibits four submarginal blue spots, increasing in size toward the anal angle. The forewing orange-yellow postdiscal band is separated into two from the costa to at least half-way down the wing. The underside mosaic pattern of jumbled blackish-brown bands with dark grey and grey-brown patches edged with silvery-white filigree, gives the underside a distinctly silvery grey impression. Seitz- Ch. pelias has almost the same markings as Charaxes castor, but is smaller and much lighter, the basal part of the upper surface being dark red-brown and the light-bordered markings of the under surface centred with grey; the discal band of the upper surface is orange-yellow and the orange-yellow marginal spots of the forewing are large and distinct. The discal band of the under surface is white and distally bordered on the fore wing by triangular orange-yellow spots, on the hindwing by deep red-brown ones; the ground-colour of the basal part beneath is red-brown. — pelias Cr.The black spots which adorn the discal band on the upperside of the forewing in cellules 2—7 are as large as, or larger than the triangular orange-yellow spots which they separate; the black marginal line of the hindwing very thick; on the underside of the hindwing the red-brown spots at the distal side of the white discal band are very small, much narrower than the band. Cape Colony, in the mountainous western parts. The larva probably on Protea grandiflora, the "Wagenboom".In saturnus Btlr. [now full species Charaxes saturnus] the black spots in the discal band of the forewing are smaller than the orange-yellow spots which they border proximally; the black marginal line of the hindwing much thinner than in the type-form; on the underside of the hindwing the red-brown spots are large and at least as broad as the band; the marginal spots on the upper surface are sometimes little larger than in the type-form, sometimes very large, From Natal to the Congo and British East Africa. — ab. laticinctus (brunnescens Rothsch.) has the basal part of the upper surface brown-black, the discal band darker orange-yellow than in saturnus and the marginal spots small and brown. North Angola.

Van Son - Superficially resembles Charaxes saturnus Butler, from which it differs in the following characters: smaller size; orange-yellow markings of upperside lighter; hindwing discal band broader posteriorly, not triangular, and extending to vein Cu2; forewing underside with orange markings much reduced, transverse red-brown markings of basal areas and spots of same colour beyond hindwing discal band much darker, and those in anal area obsolete; tails on hindwing much shorter; antenna/wing ratio higher; numerous differences in genitalia, early stages and larval food plants .

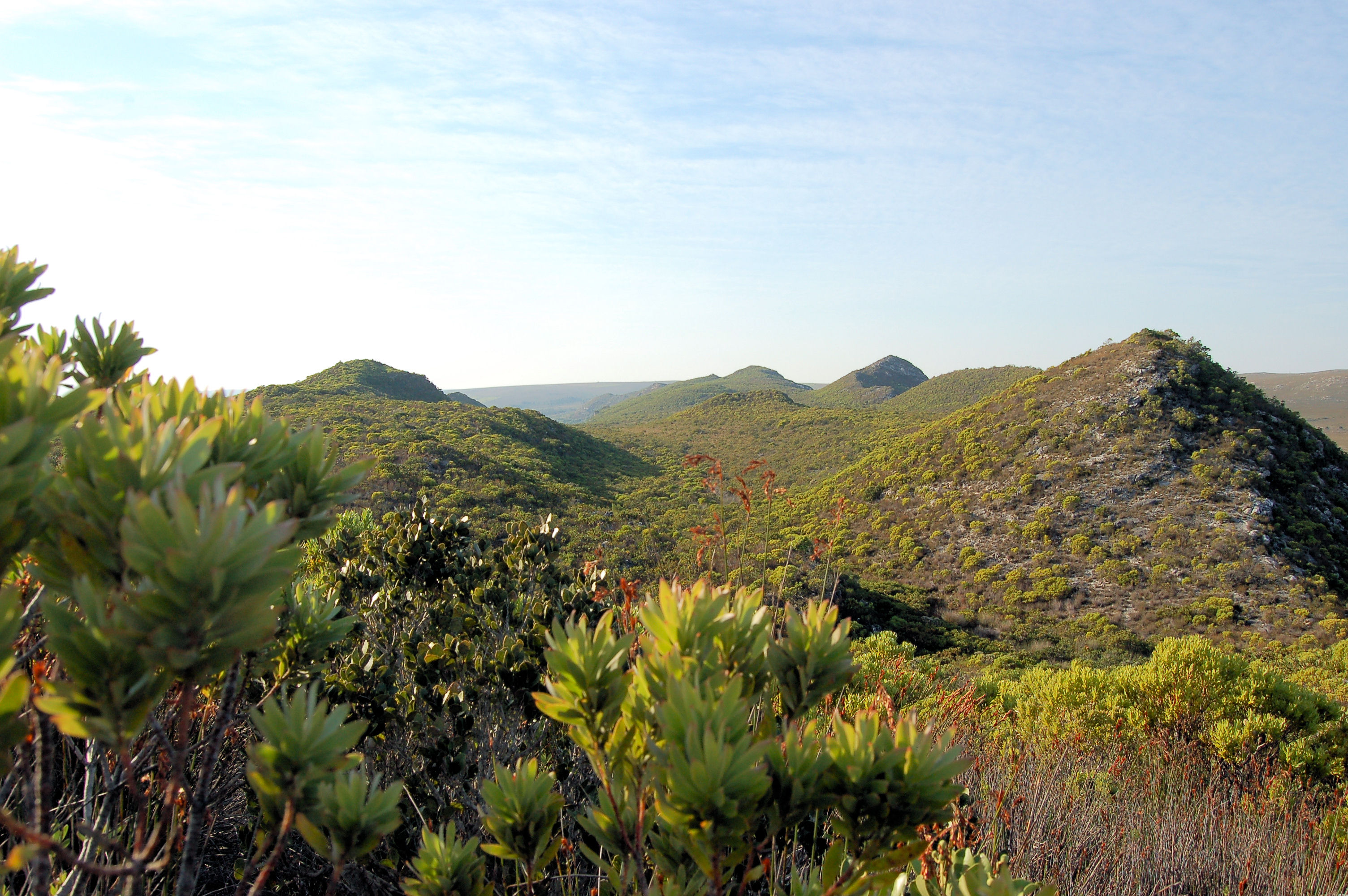
Macchia habitat.Western Cape

== Biology ==
The habitat is Fynbos (Cape Macchia) in montane areas. It has successive broods from September to April. Notes on the biology of pelias are given by Pringle et al (1994)

== Related Species ==
Historical attempts to assemble a cluster of presumably related species into a "Charaxes jasius Group" have not been wholly convincing. More recent taxonomic revision, corroborated by phylogenetic research, allow a more rational grouping congruent with cladistic relationships. Within a well-populated clade of 27 related species sharing a common ancestor approximately 16 mya during the Miocene, 26 are now considered together as The jasius Group. One of the two lineages forms a robust clade of seven species sharing a common ancestor approximately 2-3 mya, i.e. during the Pliocene, and are considered as the jasius subgroup.

The jasius Group (26 Species)

Clade 1: jasius subgroup (7 species):

- Charaxes jasius
- Charaxes epijasius [stat.rev.2005]
- Charaxes legeri
- Charaxes saturnus [stat.rev.2005]
- Charaxes pelias
- Charaxes castor
- Charaxes hansali

Clade 2: contains the well-populated three additional subgroups (19 species) of the jasius Group, called the brutus, pollux, and eudoxus subgroups. Further exploration of the phylogenetic relationships amongst existing Charaxes taxa is required to improve clarity.

== Natural history ==
Full description of the early stages, from egg-laying, larval instars, to pupal emergence, and the flight behaviour of C. pelias, were described by C. G. C.Dickson (1949) The larvae feed on Hypocalyptus sophoroides, Osyris compressa, Osyris lanceolata, and Rafnia species. The imago flies from October to April.
