= Charaxes cacuthis =

- Figures 12 and 13

Scientific classification
- Kingdom: Animalia
- Phylum: Arthropoda
- Clade: Pancrustacea
- Class: Insecta
- Order: Lepidoptera
- Family: Nymphalidae
- Genus: Charaxes
- Species: C. cacuthis

Binomial name
- Charaxes cacuthis Hewitson, 1863

Synonyms
- Charaxes antanala Lucas, 1872

Species of butterfly

Charaxes cacuthis is a butterfly in the family Nymphalidae. It is found on Madagascar. The habitat consists of lowland and coastal forests.

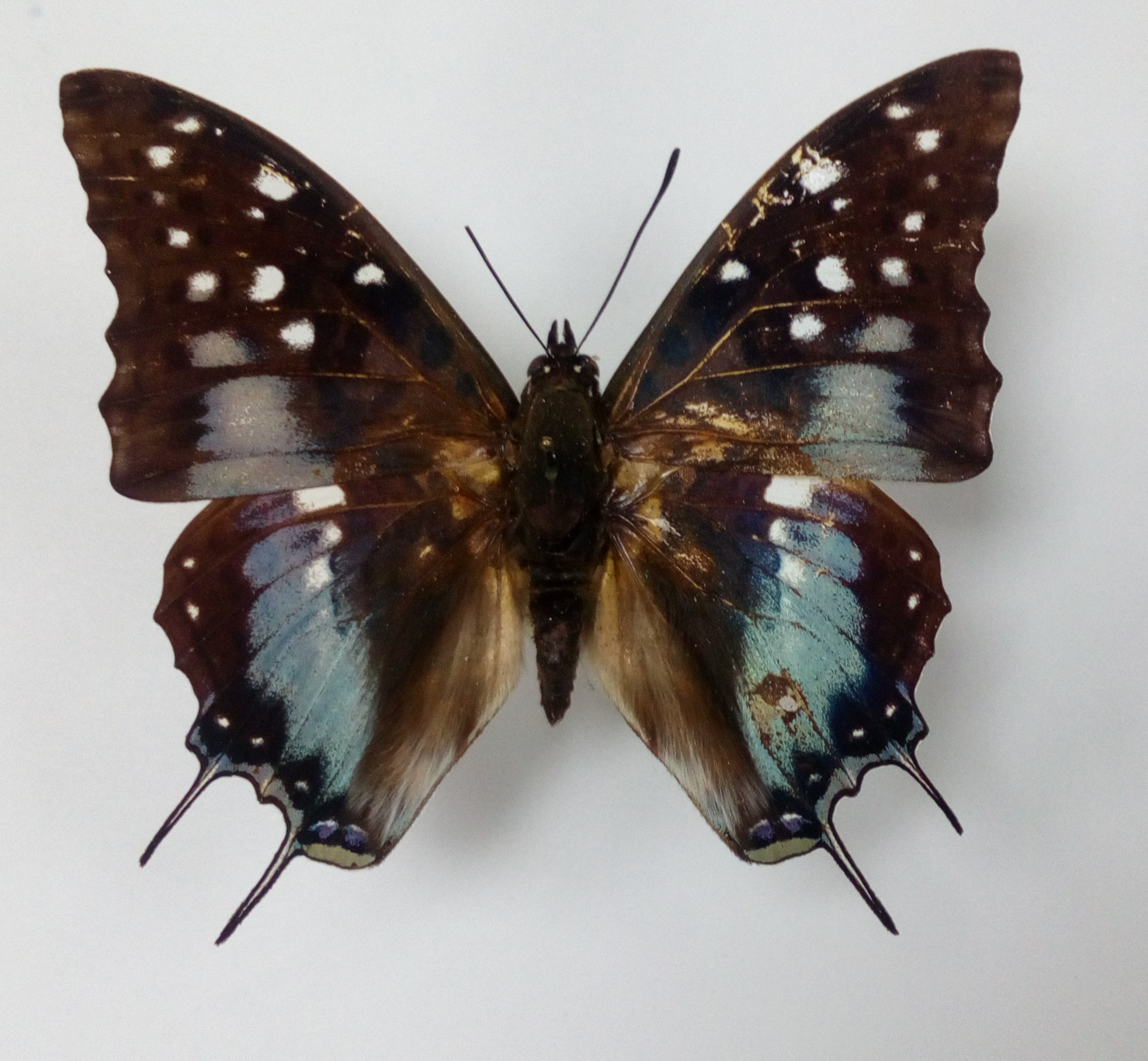
recto

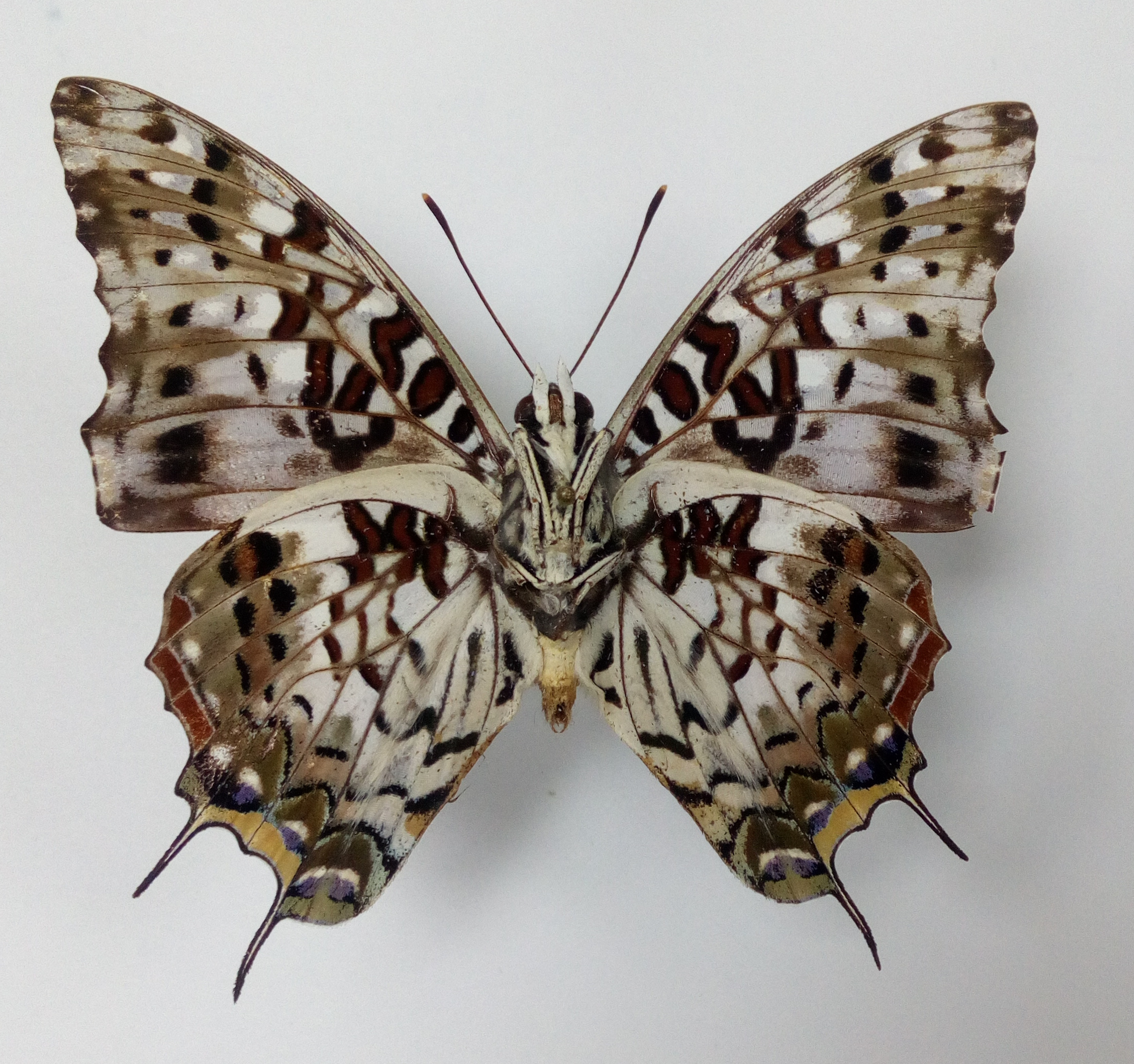
verso

== Description ==
A full description is given by Walter Rothschild and Karl Jordan (1900). Novitates Zoologicae volume 7:287-524. page 457-458 as subspecies of Charaxes etesipe (for terms see Novitates Zoologicae volume 5:545-601 ) Seitz- Very similar to Charaxes etesipe In the male, however, the blue transverse band is continuous and about 8 millimetres (0.31 in). in breadth, not narrowed anteriorly; the blue spots in cellules la and lb on the forewing are about 6 mm. in breadth and joined together into a band. The female is distinguished by having the broad median band of the upper surface white on the hindwing and to vein 2 or 3 of the forewing, thence orange-yellow to the costal margin of the forewing. Madagascar. The tails of both sexes are longer than those of any other members of the etesipe group.

== Life history ==
The larvae feed on Annona senegalensis.

== Realm ==
Afrotropical realm

== Classification ==
Closely related to Charaxes penricei and Charaxes etesipe

Charaxes cacuthis is a member of the species group Charaxes etesipe.

The clade members are:

- Charaxes etesipe nominate
- Charaxes penricei
- Charaxes achaemenes
- Charaxes paradoxa
- Charaxes cacuthis
- Charaxes bwete
- Charaxes cristalensis
