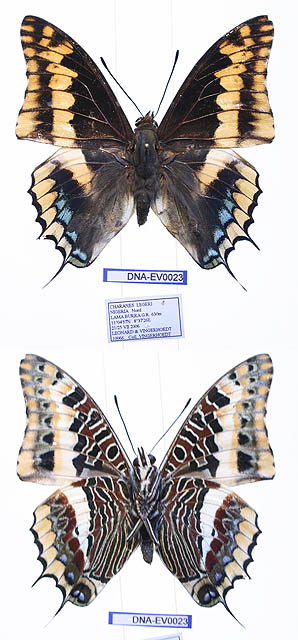
- Charaxes legeri from N. Nigeria

Scientific classification
- Kingdom: Animalia
- Phylum: Arthropoda
- Class: Insecta
- Order: Lepidoptera
- Family: Nymphalidae
- Genus: Charaxes
- Species: C. legeri

Binomial name
- Charaxes legeri Plantrou, 1978

= Charaxes legeri =

Species of butterfly

Charaxes legeri, the St. Leger's charaxes, is a butterfly in the family Nymphalidae. It is found in southern Burkina Faso, northern Benin, northern Nigeria and southern Niger. The habitat consists of woodland savanna at altitudes between 600 and 1,700 meters.

== Taxonomy ==
D’Abrera (1980) and Henning (1989) suggested that Charaxes legeri might be a hybrid between Charaxes epijasius and Charaxes castor Larsen (2005) however, argues that Charaxes legeri is a distinct species.

== Related species ==
Historical attempts to assemble a cluster of presumably related species into a "Charaxes jasius Group" have not been wholly convincing. More recent taxonomic revision, corroborated by phylogenetic research, allow a more rational grouping congruent with cladistic relationships. Within a well-populated clade of 27 related species sharing a common ancestor approximately 16 mya during the Miocene, 26 are now considered together as The jasius Group. One of the two lineages forms a robust clade of seven species sharing a common ancestor approximately 2-3 mya, i.e. during the Pliocene, and are considered as the jasius subgroup.

The jasius Group (26 Species)

Clade 1: jasius subgroup (7 species):

- Charaxes jasius
- Charaxes epijasius [stat.rev.2005]
- Charaxes legeri
- Charaxes saturnus [stat.rev.2005]
- Charaxes pelias
- Charaxes castor
- Charaxes hansali

Clade 2: contains the well-populated three additional subgroups (19 species) of the jasius Group, called the brutus, pollux, and eudoxus subgroups. Further exploration of the phylogenetic relationships amongst existing Charaxes taxa is required to improve clarity.

== Natural history ==
The larvae feed on Sorghum bicolor [= roxburghii ] and Annona species.
