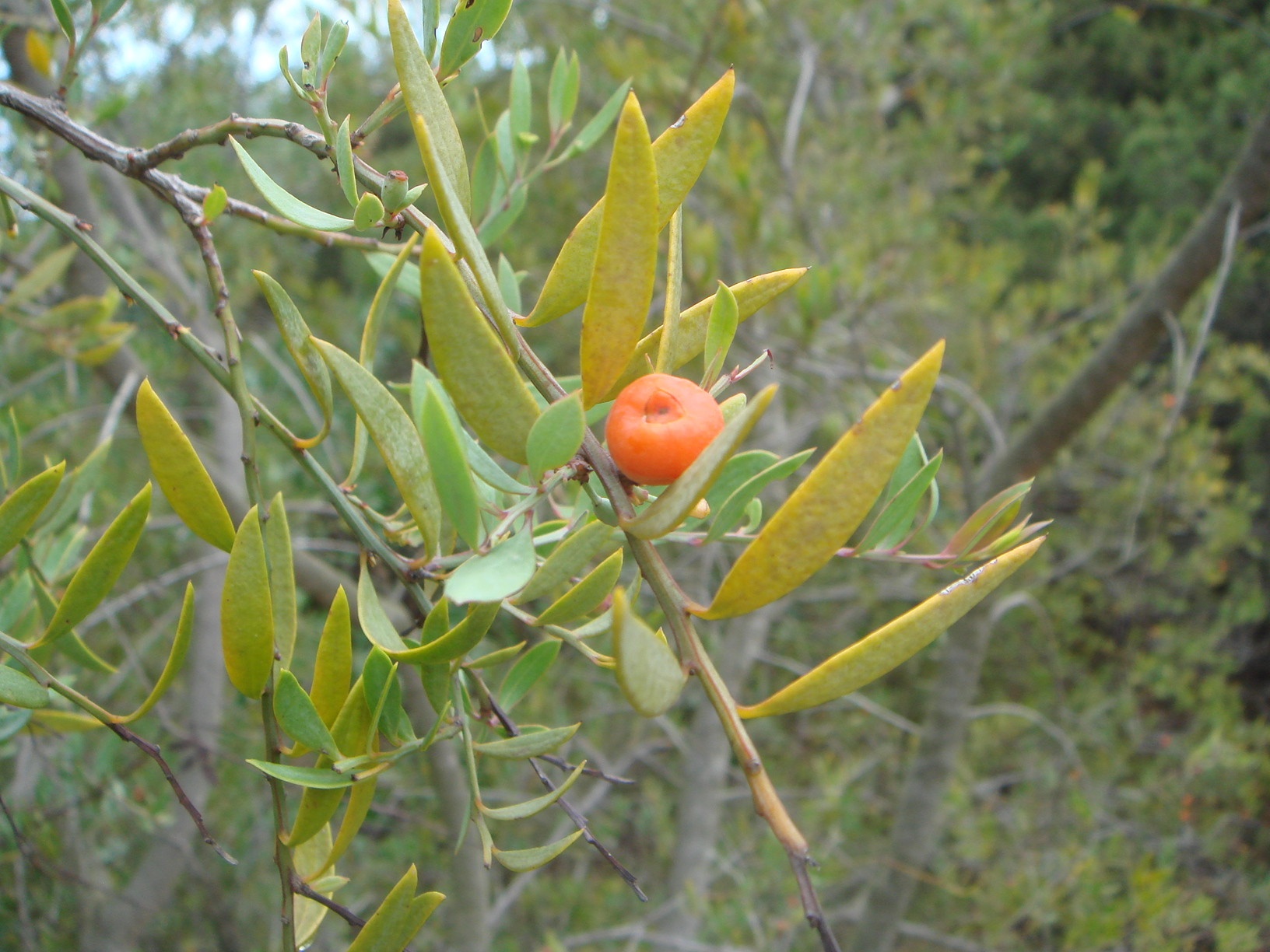
- Foliage and fruit

Conservation status
- Least Concern (IUCN 3.1)

Scientific classification
- Kingdom: Plantae
- Clade: Embryophytes
- Clade: Tracheophytes
- Clade: Angiosperms
- Clade: Eudicots
- Order: Santalales
- Family: Santalaceae
- Genus: Osyris
- Species: O. lanceolata

Binomial name
- Osyris lanceolata Hochst. & Steud.

Synonyms
- Osyris abyssinica Hochst. ex A.Rich.; Osyris abyssinica f. latifolia Fiori; Osyris arborea Wall. ex A.DC.; Osyris arborea var. puberula Hook.f.; Osyris arborea var. rotundifolia P.C.Tam; Osyris arborea var. stipitata Lecomte; Osyris arborea var. tipitata Lecomte; Osyris densifolia Peter; Osyris divaricata Pilg.; Osyris laeta Peter; Osyris nepalensis Griff.; Osyris oblanceolata Peter; Osyris parvifolia Baker; Osyris pendula Balf.f.; Osyris quadrifida Salzm. ex A.DC.; Osyris quadripartita Salzm. ex Decne.; Osyris quadripartita var. canariensis Kämmer; Osyris rigidissima Engl.; Osyris tenuifolia Engl.; Osyris urundiensis De Wild.; Osyris wightiana J.Graham; Osyris wightiana Wall. ex Wight; Osyris wightiana var. puberula (Hook.f.) Kumari; Osyris wightiana var. rotundifolia (P.C.Tam) P.C.Tam; Osyris wightiana var. stipitata (Lecomte) P.C.Tam

= Osyris lanceolata =

Species of flowering plant

Osyris lanceolata, also known as African sandalwood, watta bush or Camwood, is used for its scented wood and to extract essential oil. The semi-parasitic plant is found from South Africa to Zimbabwe and east Africa, including Tanzania, Kenya and Uganda; northwest Africa; the Canary Islands and the southern half of the Iberian Peninsula. It grows in rocky areas or along the margins of dry forest, but is usually not abundant in any one place.

The wood is overexploited in parts of its range despite legal protection. In Somaliland, the leaves and tender branches of the tree are used for tanning leather.
