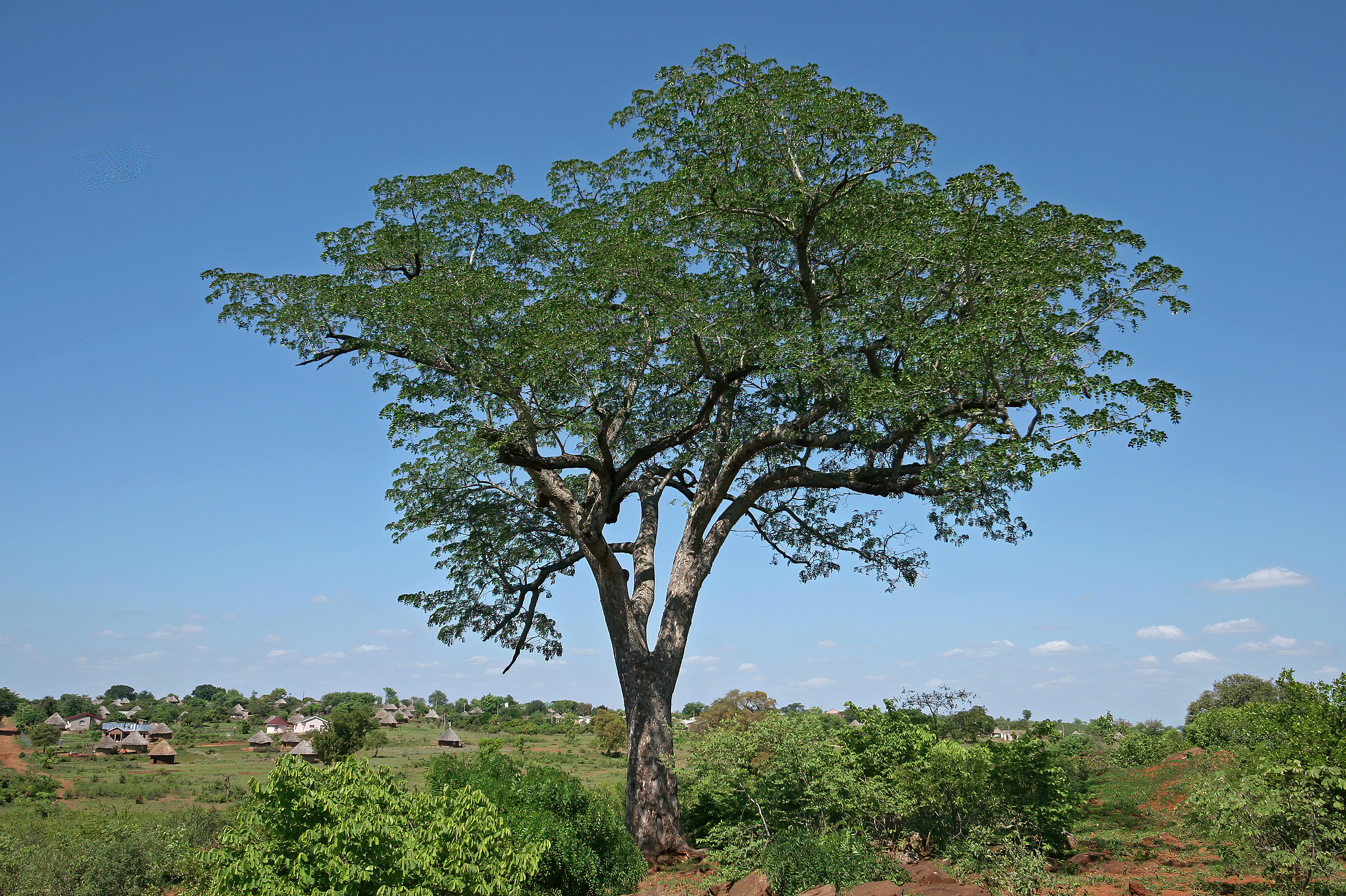
- A. quanzensis in Ha-Tshikonelo, Venda, Limpopo, South Africa
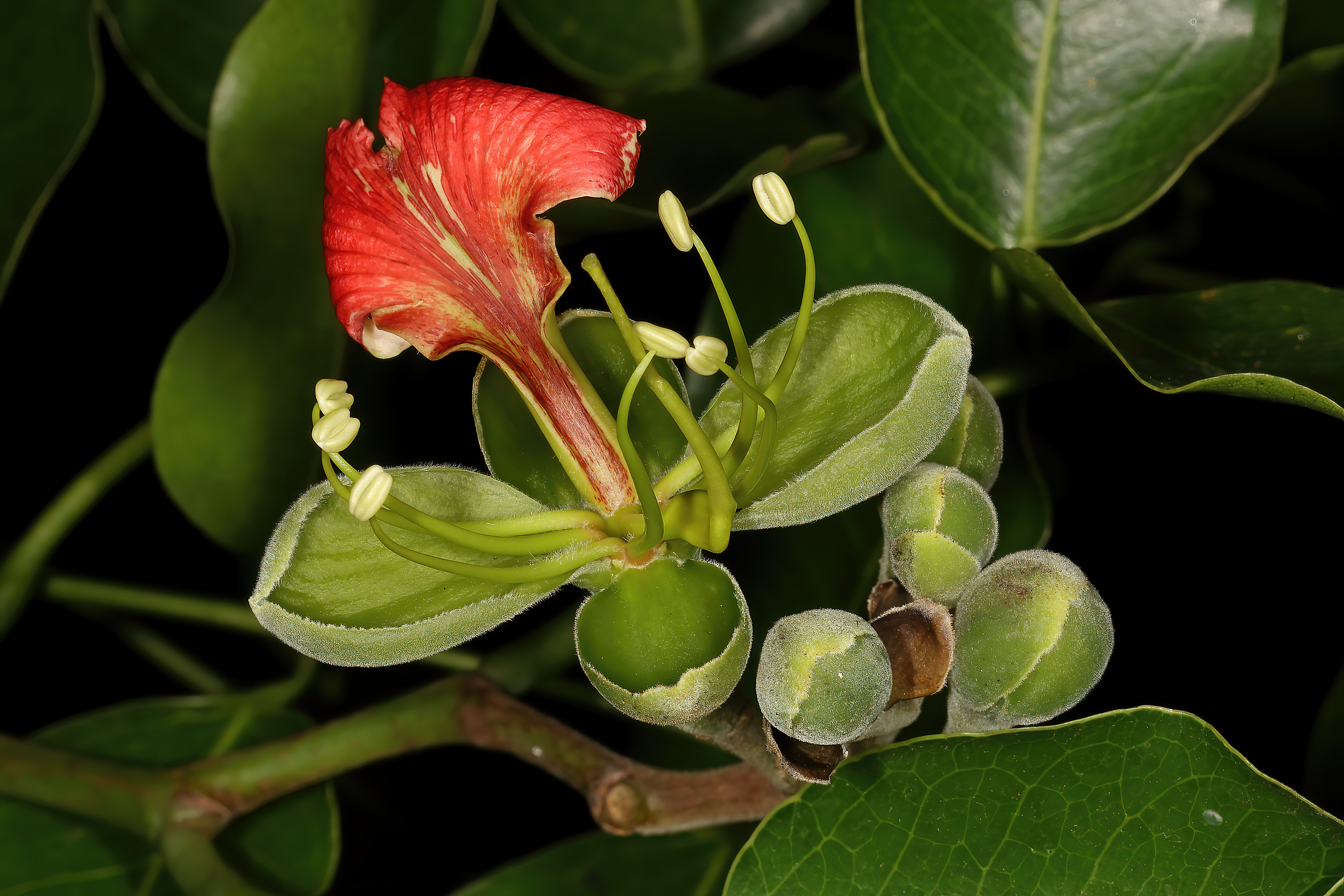
- Flower

Conservation status
- Least Concern (IUCN 3.1)

Scientific classification
- Kingdom: Plantae
- Clade: Tracheophytes
- Clade: Angiosperms
- Clade: Eudicots
- Clade: Rosids
- Order: Fabales
- Family: Fabaceae
- Genus: Afzelia
- Species: A. quanzensis

Binomial name
- Afzelia quanzensis Welw. (1859)

Synonyms
- Afrafzelia attenuata (Klotzsch) Pierre (1899); Afrafzelia petersiana (Klotzsch) Pierre (1899); Afrafzelia quanzensis (Welw.) Pierre (1899); Afzelia attenuata Klotzsch (1861); Afzelia petersiana Klotzsch (1861); Intsia attenuata (Klotzsch) Kuntze (1891); Intsia petersiana (Klotzsch) Kuntze (1891); Intsia quanzensis (Welw.) Kuntze ex Engl. (1894); Pahudia attenuata (Klotzsch) Prain (1902); Pahudia quanzensis (Welw.) Prain (1902)

= Afzelia quanzensis =

Pod mahogany

Species of legume

Afzelia quanzensis (pod mahogany, Afrikaans: peulmahonie, Venda: mutokota, Zulu: inkehli) is a species of tree native to sub-Saharan Africa. It ranges from Somalia and Democratic Republic of the Congo to South Africa. It is a protected tree in South Africa. It belongs to the subfamily Caesalpinioideae of the bean family Fabaceae.

== Description ==
This deciduous tree can grow up to 20 metres (66 ft) height (occasionally to 35 metres), and has smooth, grey bark, which can flake in irregular patches. It has glossy dark green leaves and flowers between October and November. The flowers have a solitary large red petal. After flowering, it produces a seed capsule, a thick woody pod, up to 23 cm (9.1 in) long, which contains 6 or 7 black seeds with a hard, bright red aril covering one end.

== Uses ==
The seeds are sometimes made into native necklaces and the timber is an ornamental hardwood, used in furniture, parquet flooring and railway sleepers.

This plant may be used in traditional medicine.

== See also ==
- List of Southern African indigenous trees
