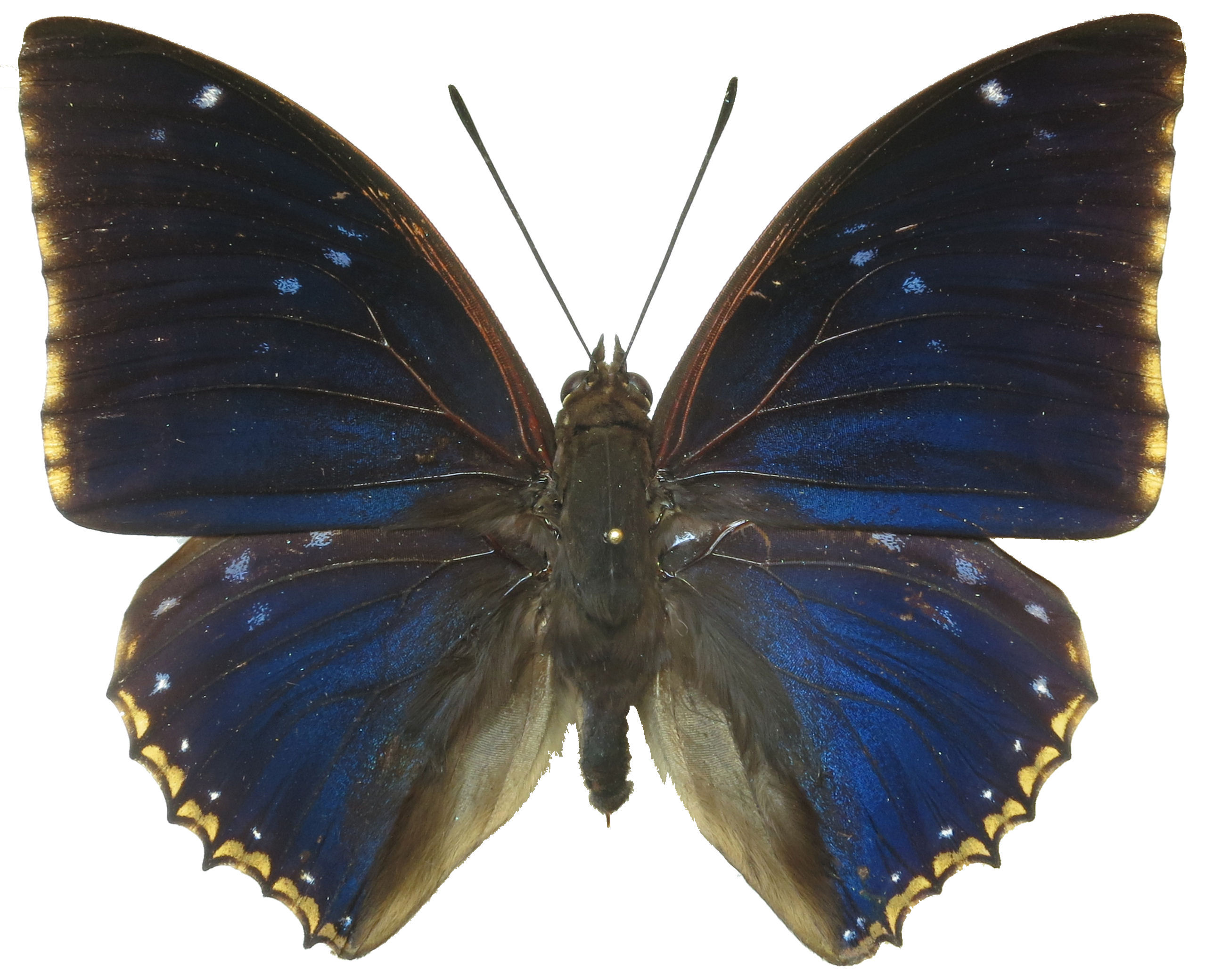
- Male C. b. ugandensis from the CAR
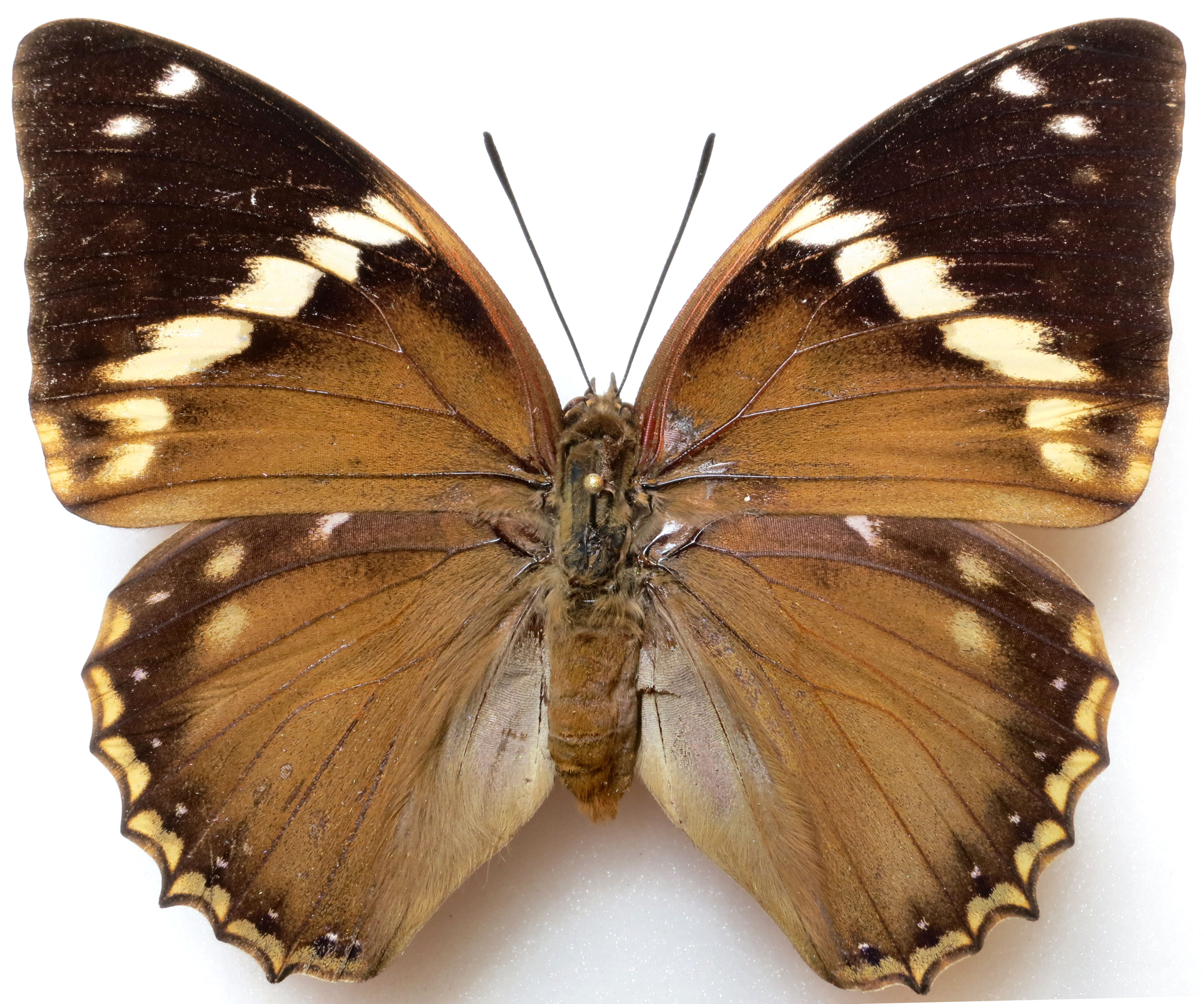
- Female C. b. ugandensis from Kenya

Scientific classification
- Kingdom: Animalia
- Phylum: Arthropoda
- Clade: Pancrustacea
- Class: Insecta
- Order: Lepidoptera
- Family: Nymphalidae
- Genus: Charaxes
- Species: C. bipunctatus

Binomial name
- Charaxes bipunctatus Rothschild, 1894

Synonyms
- Charaxes bipunctatus johnstoni Rousseau-Decelle, 1956

= Charaxes bipunctatus =

Species of butterfly

Charaxes bipunctatus, the two-spot blue charaxes, is a butterfly in the family Nymphalidae. It is found in Ivory Coast, Ghana, Nigeria, Cameroon, Gabon, the Republic of the Congo, the Democratic Republic of the Congo, the Central African Republic, Uganda, Sudan, Kenya and Tanzania. A local and uncommon butterfly.

== Description ==
Ch. bipunctatus Rothsch. is another close ally of tiridates, distinguished chiefly by the very short, tooth- like tails of the hindwing. Both sexes above coloured and marked like those of tiridates; the blue spots, however, in the male in part indistinct or absent and the marginal streaks of the hindwing thick, ochre-yellow and not interrupted. Ashanti to Aruwimi. A full description is also given by Walter Rothschild and Karl Jordan, 1900 Novitates Zoologicae volume 7:287-524. page 390 (for terms see Novitates Zoologicae volume 5:545-601 ) Differs from Charaxes tiridates and Charaxes numenes in that there are only two hindwing postdiscal spots (in spaces 5 and 6) and in the continuous yellowish distal margin

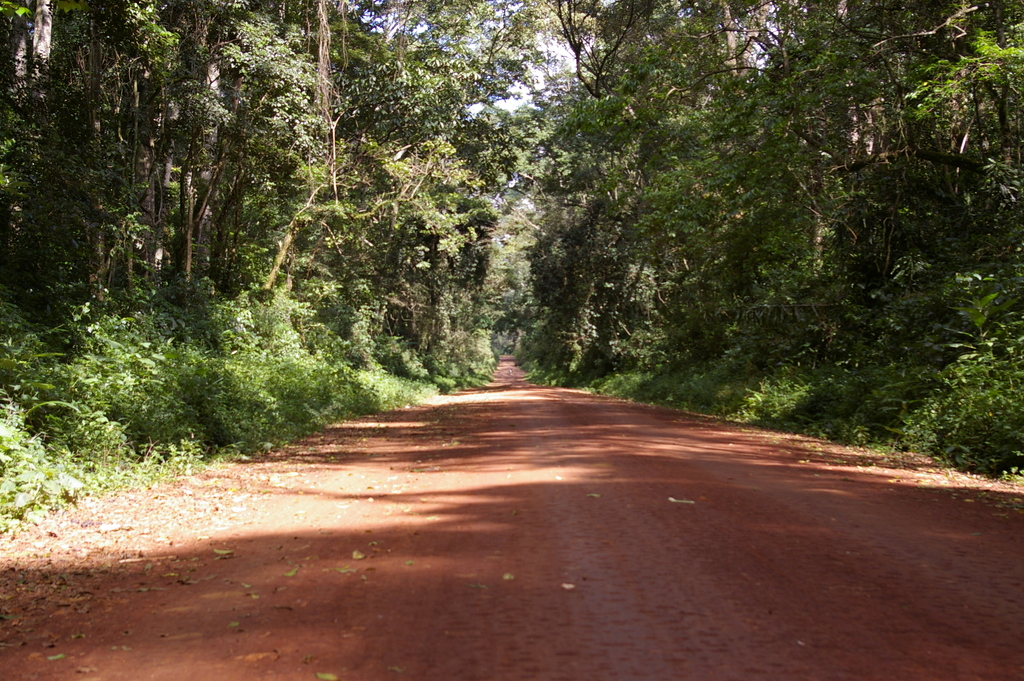
Habitat in Kenya

== Biology ==
The habitat consists of lowland evergreen forests and sub-montane forests at altitudes between 1,200 and 1,500 meters.

The larvae feed on Blighia unijugata.

== Taxonomy ==
Charaxes tiridates group

The supposed clade members are:

- Charaxes tiridates
- Charaxes numenes similar to next
- Charaxes bipunctatus similar to last
- Charaxes violetta
- Charaxes fuscus
- Charaxes mixtus
- Charaxes bubastis
- Charaxes albimaculatus
- Charaxes barnsi
- Charaxes bohemani
- Charaxes schoutedeni
- Charaxes monteiri
- Charaxes smaragdalis
- Charaxes xiphares
- Charaxes cithaeron
- Charaxes nandina
- Charaxes imperialis
- Charaxes ameliae
- Charaxes pythodoris
- ? Charaxes overlaeti

For a full list see Eric Vingerhoedt, 2013

== Subspecies ==
- C. b. bipunctatus (Ivory Coast, Ghana, western Nigeria)
- C. b. ugandensis van Someren, 1972 (Cameroon, Gabon, Congo, Democratic Republic of the Congo, Central African Republic, western Uganda, western Kenya, southern Sudan, north-western Tanzania)

Torben Larsen developed a species numbering system for his 2005 publication Butterflies of West Africa. The nominate subspecies is #742. The 'Larsen' numbers have since been used with permission in A Sharp Eye on Butterflies of Ghana.

== See also ==
- Kakamega Forest
