= Charaxes numenes =

- male in Ghana

Scientific classification
- Kingdom: Animalia
- Phylum: Arthropoda
- Clade: Pancrustacea
- Class: Insecta
- Order: Lepidoptera
- Family: Nymphalidae
- Genus: Charaxes
- Species: C. numenes

Binomial name
- Charaxes numenes (Hewitson, 1859).

Synonyms
- Nymphalis numenes Hewitson, 1859; Charaxes numenes f. obsolescens Stoneham, 1931; Charaxes numenes laticatena Le Cerf, 1932; Charaxes albimaculatus van Someren, 1972

Species of butterfly

Charaxes numenes, the lesser blue charaxes, is a butterfly in the family Nymphalidae. It is found in Senegal, Guinea-Bissau, Guinea, Sierra Leone, Liberia, Ivory Coast, Ghana, Benin, Nigeria, Equatorial Guinea, Cameroon, Gabon, the Republic of the Congo, Angola, the Democratic Republic of the Congo, Zambia, the Central African Republic, Sudan, Ethiopia, Uganda, Kenya and Tanzania.

== Description ==
Ch. numenes Hew. (31 c). Tails of the hindwing short. Hindwing beneath somewhat beyond the middle with a continuous, fine, gently curved, black transverse line, distally bordered with white, almost exactly as in violetta. In this these two species differ from all the rest of the tiridates group. Male, wings above bluish black, at the base black-brown; forewing in the middle with four small blue spots in the basal part of cellules 2-5 and usually also behind the middle with a transverse row of blue dots; marginal spots distinct, ochre-yellow. Hindwing beyond the middle with a row of blue dots, incurved in cellule 6; small whitish submarginal spots and fine whitish marginal streaks. The female agrees almost entirely with that of tiridates Sierra Leone to Angola and Uganda. - neumanni Rothsch. has larger yellow marginal spots on both wings and somewhat longer tail-appendages on the hindwing; Abyssinia.

== Biology ==
The habitat consists of evergreen lowland forests.

The larvae feed on Hugonia platysepela, Grewia mollis, Grewia forbesi, Grewia trichocarpa, Deinbollia fulvotomentella, Erythrina abyssinica, Erythrina excelsa, Allophylus, Blighia unijugata and Phialodiscus unijugatus.

== Subspecies ==
- Charaxes numenes numenes (Senegal, Guinea-Bissau, Guinea, Sierra Leone, Liberia, Ivory Coast, Ghana, Benin, western Nigeria)
- Charaxes numenes aequatorialis van Someren, 1972 (Nigeria, Cameroon, Gabon, Congo, northern Angola, Democratic Republic of the Congo, Zambia, Central African Republic, southern Sudan, Uganda, western Kenya, western Tanzania)
- Charaxes numenes malabo Turlin, 1998 (Bioko)
- Charaxes numenes neumanni Rothschild, 1902 (southern and western Ethiopia)

Torben Larsen developed a species numbering system for his 2005 publication Butterflies of West Africa. The nominate subspecies is #743. The 'Larsen' numbers have since been used with permission in A Sharp Eye on Butterflies of Ghana.

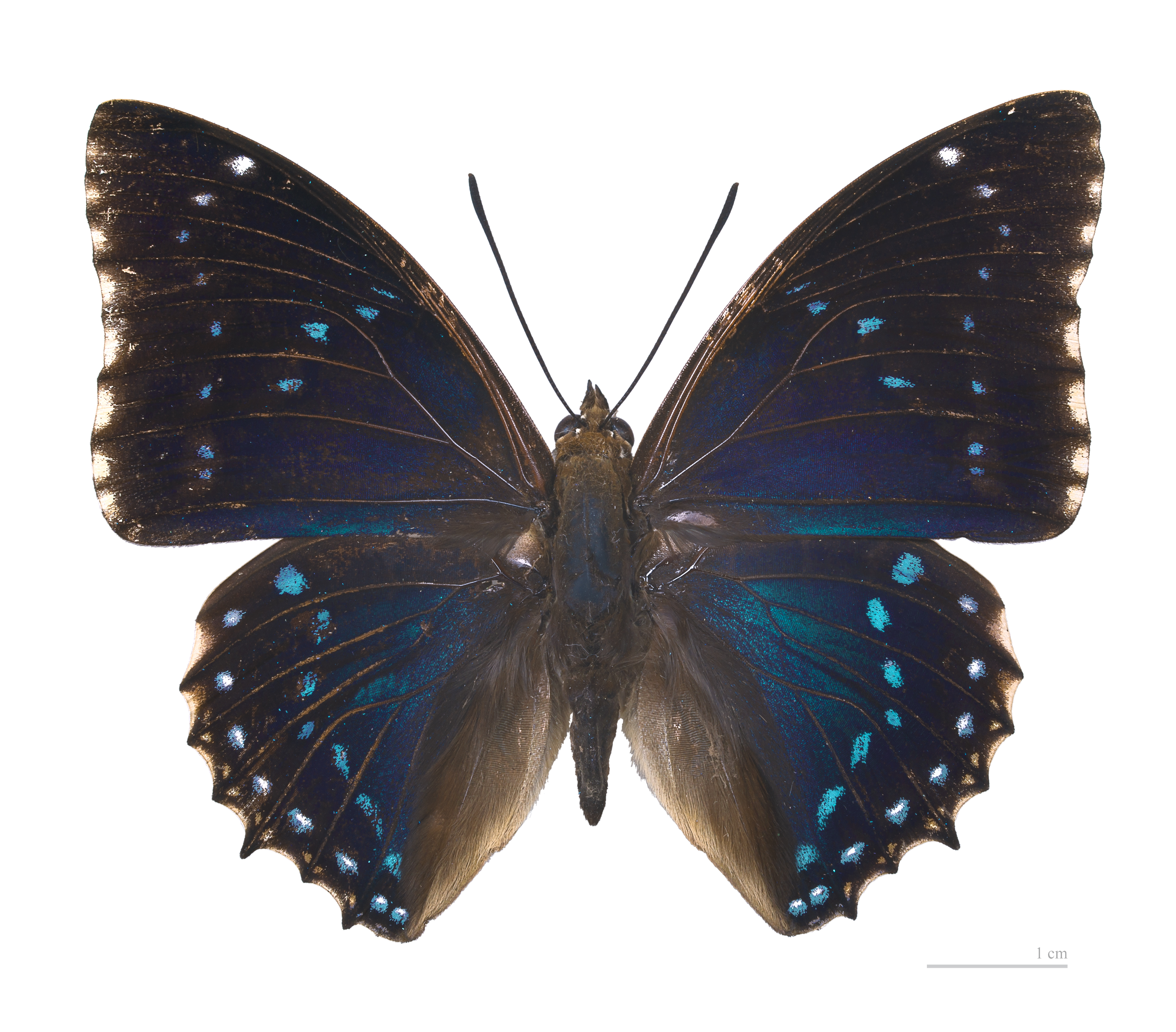
Male - dorsal side

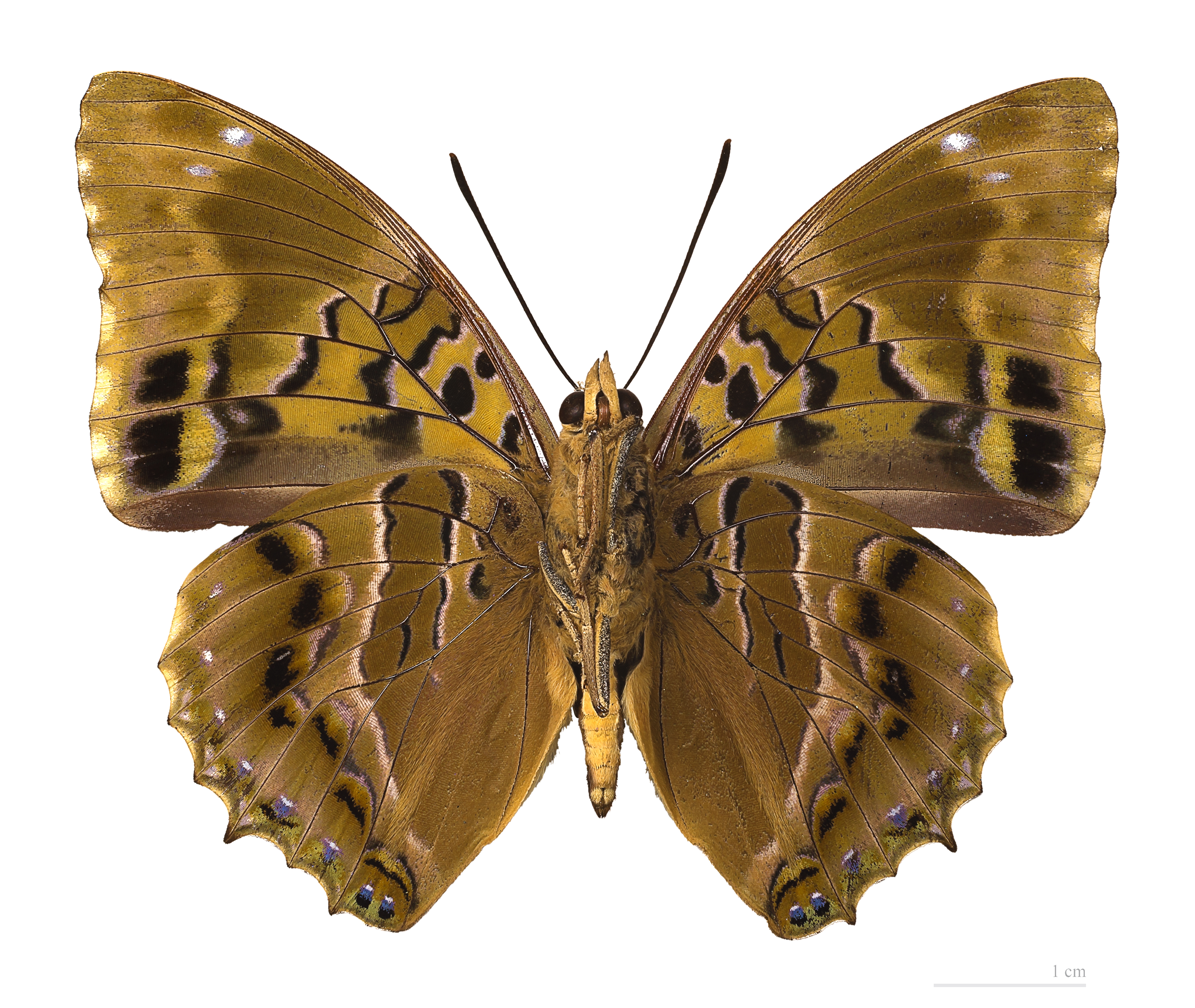
Male - ventral side

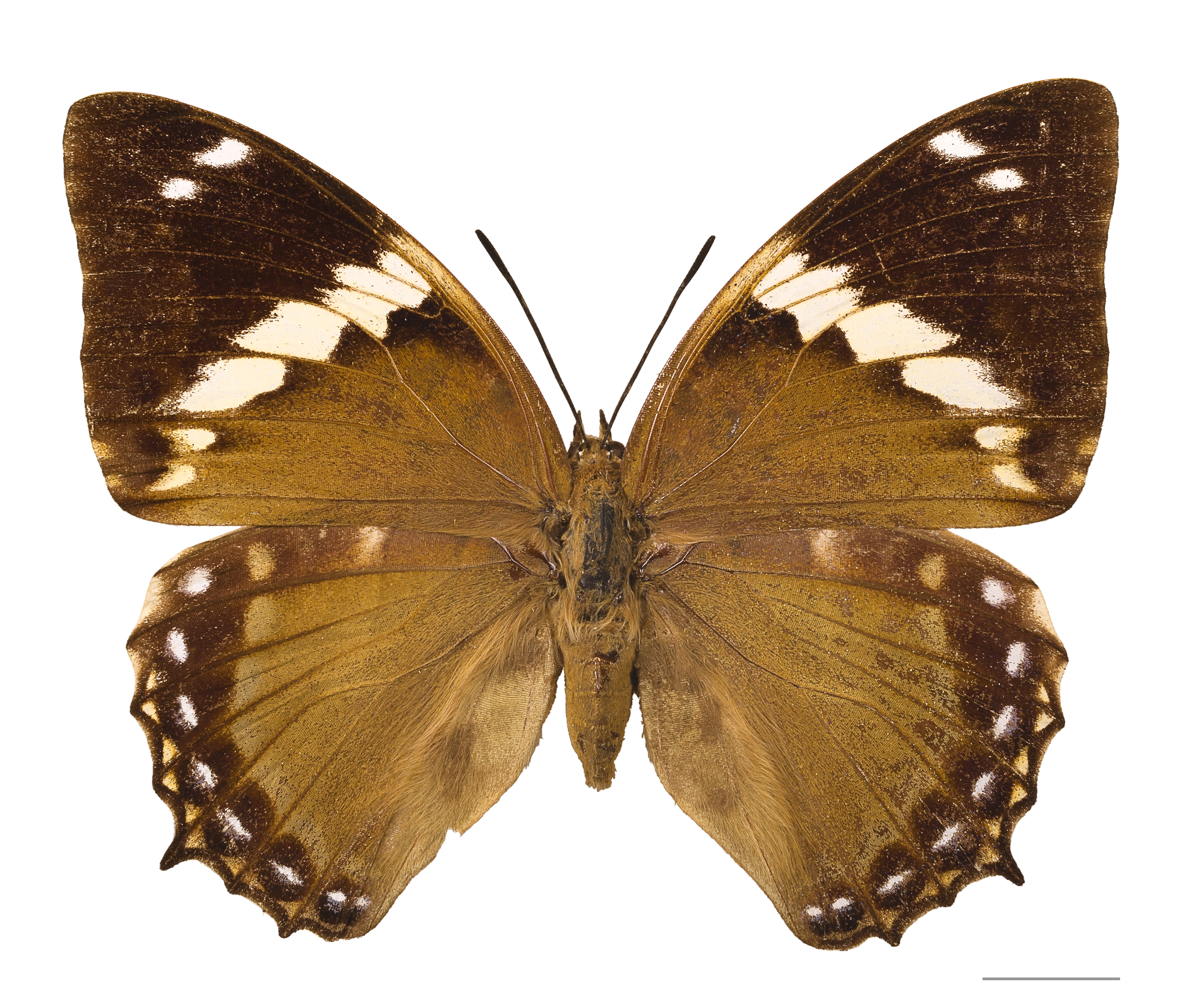
Female - dorsal side

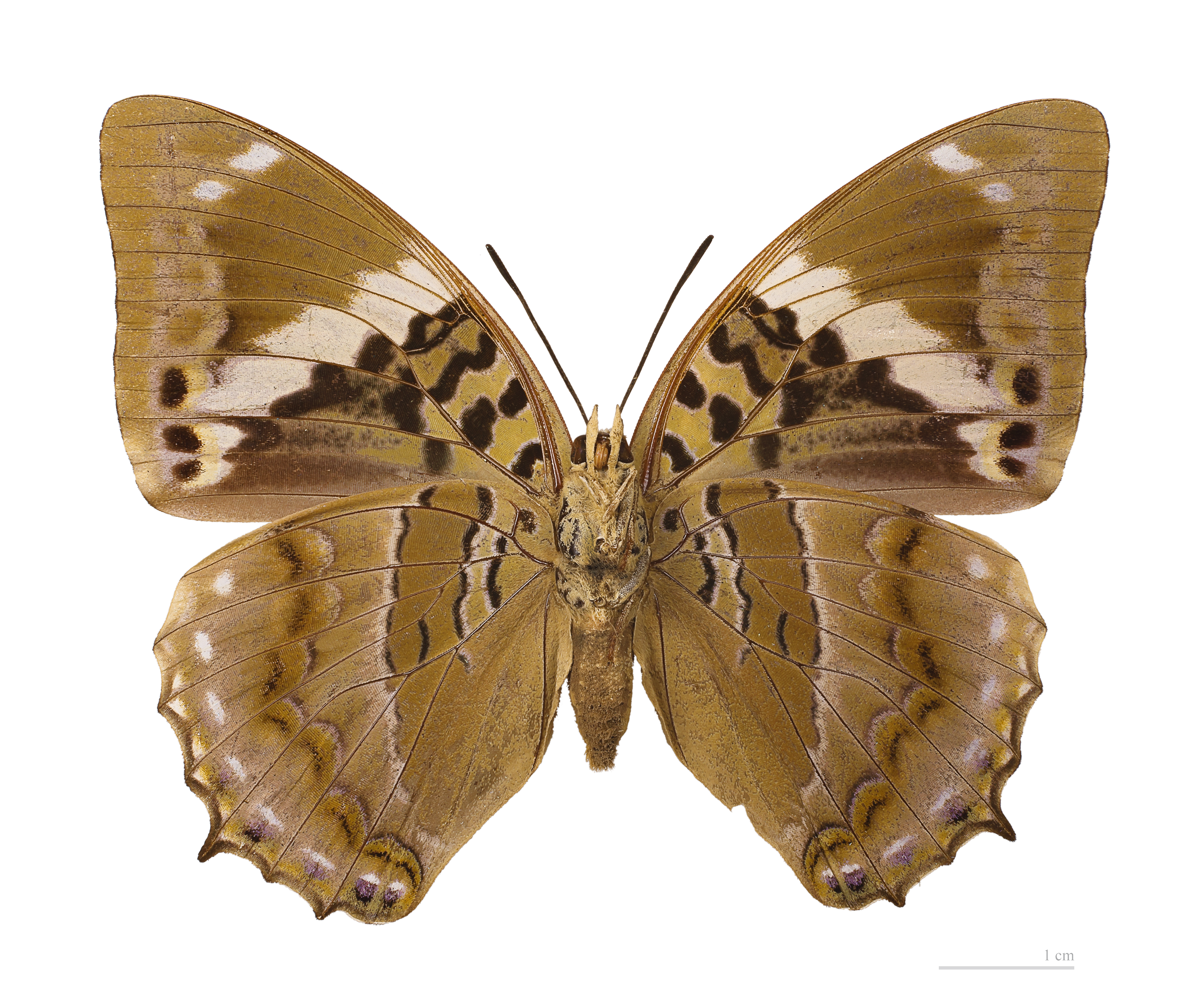
Female - ventral side

== Taxonomy ==
Charaxes tiridates group.

The supposed clade members are:

- Charaxes tiridates
- Charaxes numenes - similar to next
- Charaxes bipunctatus - similar to last
- Charaxes violetta
- Charaxes fuscus
- Charaxes mixtus
- Charaxes bubastis
- Charaxes albimaculatus
- Charaxes barnsi
- Charaxes bohemani
- Charaxes schoutedeni
- Charaxes monteiri
- Charaxes smaragdalis
- Charaxes xiphares
- Charaxes cithaeron
- Charaxes nandina
- Charaxes imperialis
- Charaxes ameliae
- Charaxes pythodoris
- ? Charaxes overlaeti

For a full list see Eric Vingerhoedt, 2013.
