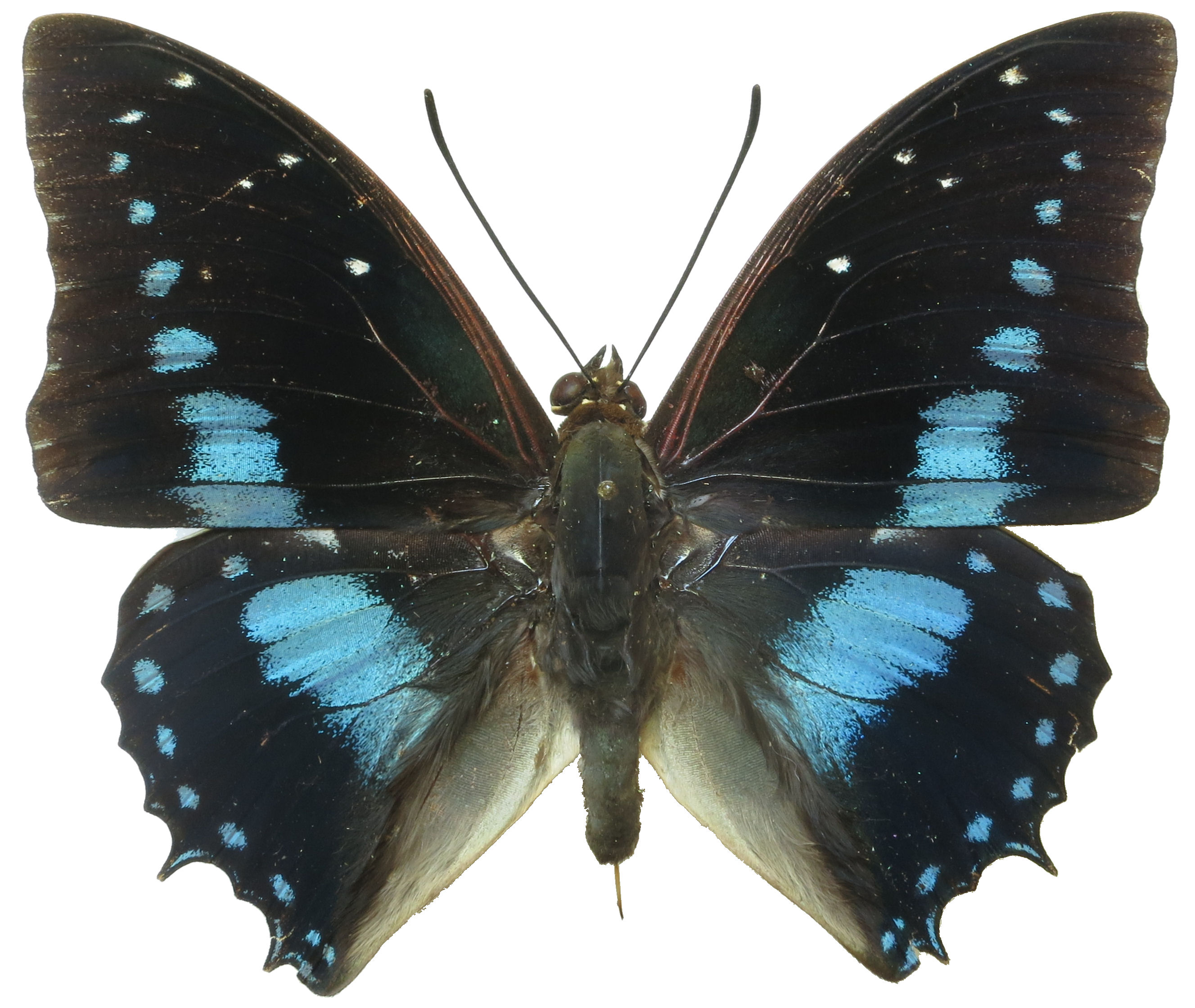
- From the CAR

Conservation status
- Least Concern (IUCN 3.1)

Scientific classification
- Kingdom: Animalia
- Phylum: Arthropoda
- Class: Insecta
- Order: Lepidoptera
- Family: Nymphalidae
- Genus: Charaxes
- Species: C. imperialis

Binomial name
- Charaxes imperialis Butler, 1874

Synonyms
- Charaxes imperialis ugandicus f. caerulipunctatus van Someren, 1972

= Charaxes imperialis =

Species of butterfly

Charaxes imperialis, the imperial blue charaxes, is a butterfly in the family Nymphalidae. It is found in Guinea-Bissau, Guinea, Sierra Leone, Liberia, Ivory Coast, Ghana, Benin, Nigeria, Cameroon, Equatorial Guinea, the Republic of the Congo, the Central African Republic, the Democratic Republic of the Congo, Rwanda, Uganda, Tanzania and Zambia.

== Description ==
Ch. imperialis Btlr. male – forewing above with a straight blue transverse band, which starts somewhat behind the middle of the hindmargin, runs obliquely towards the apex, gradually narrowing anteriorly and broken up into spots; the band is 5 mm. in breadth at the hindmargin and only continuous to vein 2, then broken up into spots; the spots in cellules 3-5 contain white dots and those in cellules 6 and 7 are white, the one in cellule 7 placed nearer to the base than that in 6; the forewing is black and has in addition to these spots a white dot at the apex of the cell in cellule 4, a white dot before the middle of cellules 5 and 6 and small blue marginal spots. On the hindwing the blue band is continued to vein 2 with a breadth of about 7 mm. and placed almost exactly in the middle, covering the apex of the cell; blue submarginal spots and marginal streaks; tails short, about 3 mm. in length. On the under surface of the hindwing the black, distally light-margined transverse streaks of cellules 2-7 are placed in a nearly straight line. In the female the blue median band between vein 2 on the hindwing and vein 2 on the forewing is formed just as in the male, then follow in each cellule from 2-7 on the forewing two rounded, light yellow spots, the proximal one in cellule 4 placed at the apex of the cell; the marginal spots of both wings and the submarginal spots of the hindwing are yellowish. A rare species occurring from Sierra Leone to the Congo.

== Subspecies ==
- C. i. imperialis (Guinea-Bissau, Guinea, Sierra Leone, Liberia, Ivory Coast, Ghana, Benin)
- C. i. albipuncta Joicey & Talbot, 1920(Nigeria, Cameroon, Central African Republic, northern Democratic Republic of the Congo)
- C. i. dargei Collins, 1989 (southern Congo)
- C. i. graziellae Turlin, 1989(Tanzania: north-west to the Mumwendo Forest)
- C. i. lisomboensis van Someren, 1975 (north-eastern Zambia, Tanzania: Kigoma)
- C. i. nathaliae Canu, 1989 (Bioko)
- C. i. pauliani Rousseau-Decelle, 1933 Democratic Republic of the Congo: south to Lualaba)
- C. i. ugandicus van Someren, 1972 (Uganda, Democratic Republic of the Congo: north Kivu)
- C. i. werneri Turlin, 1989 (Rwanda: Nyungwe Forest)

== Biology ==
The habitat consists of lowland to sub-montane forests.

The larvae probably feed on Sapindaceae species.

Subspecies lisomboensis occurs at altitudes from 800 to 1 500 m.

== Taxonomy ==
Charaxes tiridates group.

The supposed clade members are:

- Charaxes tiridates
- Charaxes numenes similar to next
- Charaxes bipunctatus similar to last
- Charaxes violetta
- Charaxes fuscus
- Charaxes mixtus
- Charaxes bubastis
- Charaxes albimaculatus
- Charaxes barnsi
- Charaxes bohemani
- Charaxes schoutedeni
- Charaxes monteiri
- Charaxes smaragdalis
- Charaxes xiphares
- Charaxes cithaeron
- Charaxes nandina
- Charaxes imperialis
- Charaxes ameliae
- Charaxes pythodoris
- ? Charaxes overlaeti

For a full list see Eric Vingerhoedt, 2013. The type locality is "Whydah on the Gold Coast"
