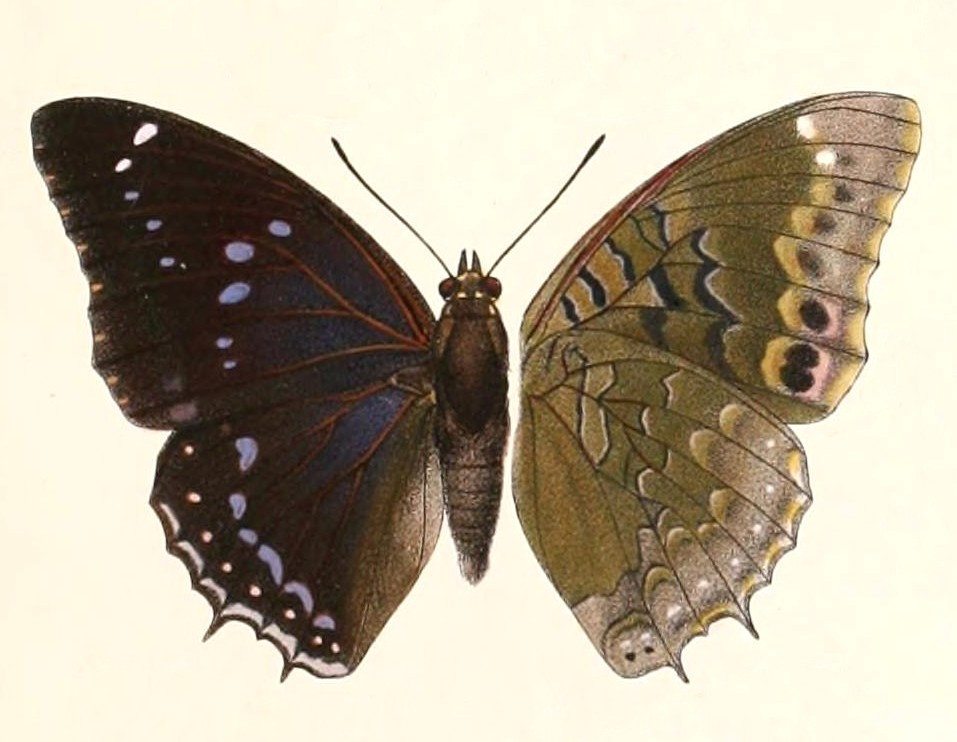
- C. m. mixtus

Scientific classification
- Kingdom: Animalia
- Phylum: Arthropoda
- Clade: Pancrustacea
- Class: Insecta
- Order: Lepidoptera
- Family: Nymphalidae
- Genus: Charaxes
- Species: C. mixtus

Binomial name
- Charaxes mixtus Rothschild, 1894..

Synonyms
- Charaxes bubastis van Schultze, 1916

= Charaxes mixtus =

Species of butterfly

Charaxes mixtus is a butterfly in the family Nymphalidae. It is found in Cameroon, the Central African Republic, Gabon, the Republic of the Congo, the Democratic Republic of the Congo and Tanzania.

== Description ==
Ch. mixtus Rothsch. The male is very similar to that of tiridates and only differs in having the marginal spots of the forewing short and whitish and the marginal streaks of the hindwing thick, undivided, blue; the blue spots behind the middle of the hindwing are also much larger than in tiridates. The female is considerably larger than the male but similar in colour and markings, hence entirely different from tiridates female . Cameroons and Congo.

== Biology ==
The habitat consists of lowland forests.

Notes on the biology of mixtus are given by Kielland (1990)

== Taxonomy ==
Charaxes tiridates group

The supposed clade members are:

- Charaxes tiridates
- Charaxes numenes similar to next
- Charaxes bipunctatus similar to last
- Charaxes violetta
- Charaxes fuscus
- Charaxes mixtus
- Charaxes bubastis
- Charaxes albimaculatus
- Charaxes barnsi
- Charaxes bohemani
- Charaxes schoutedeni
- Charaxes monteiri
- Charaxes smaragdalis
- Charaxes xiphares
- Charaxes cithaeron
- Charaxes nandina
- Charaxes imperialis
- Charaxes ameliae
- Charaxes pythodoris
- ? Charaxes overlaeti

For a full list see Eric Vingerhoedt, 2013.

== Subspecies ==
- Charaxes mixtus mixtus (Cameroon, south-western Central African Republic, Gabon, Congo, Democratic Republic of the Congo)
- Charaxes mixtus tanzanicus Kielland, 1988 (north-western Tanzania)
