= Charaxes fuscus =

Scientific classification
- Domain: Eukaryota
- Kingdom: Animalia
- Phylum: Arthropoda
- Class: Insecta
- Order: Lepidoptera
- Family: Nymphalidae
- Genus: Charaxes
- Species: C. x fuscus

Binomial name
- Charaxes x fuscus Plantrou, 1967

Synonyms
- Charaxes fuscus (Plantrou, 1967)

Species of butterfly

Charaxes x fuscus is a naturally occurring hybrid between two sympatric species of butterfly in the family Nymphalidae. It was found in the Central African Republic. The habitat consists of lowland evergreen forests.

Described from a single male collected from Bangui by Plantrou, it is now proven to be the only known example of a naturally occurring hybrid (Charaxes numenes x probably Charaxes cynthia)

== Taxonomy ==
Charaxes tiridates group.

The supposed clade members are:

- Charaxes tiridates
- Charaxes numenes similar to next
- Charaxes bipunctatus similar to last
- Charaxes violetta
- Charaxes fuscus
- Charaxes mixtus
- Charaxes bubastis
- Charaxes albimaculatus
- Charaxes barnsi
- Charaxes bohemani
- Charaxes schoutedeni
- Charaxes monteiri
- Charaxes smaragdalis
- Charaxes xiphares
- Charaxes cithaeron
- Charaxes nandina
- Charaxes imperialis
- Charaxes ameliae
- Charaxes pythodoris
- ? Charaxes overlaeti

For a full list see Eric Vingerhoedt, 2013.
