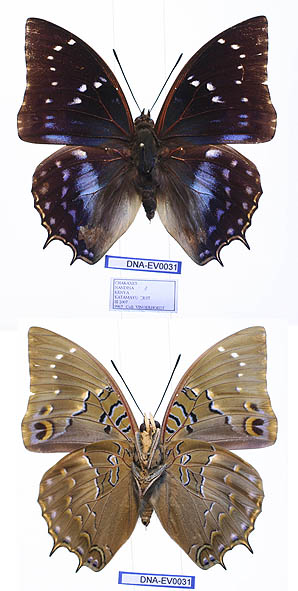

Conservation status
- Vulnerable (IUCN 3.1)

Scientific classification
- Kingdom: Animalia
- Phylum: Arthropoda
- Class: Insecta
- Order: Lepidoptera
- Family: Nymphalidae
- Genus: Charaxes
- Species: C. nandina

Binomial name
- Charaxes nandina Rothschild & Jordan, 1901

= Charaxes nandina =

Species of butterfly

Charaxes nandina is a butterfly in the family Nymphalidae. It is found in Kenya, in the central highlands east of the Rift Valley.

== Description ==
Ch. nandina Rothsch. : forewing above black, behind the middle of the hindmargin with an oblong blue spot in la, 2—4 blue spots in lb and then with 2 irregularly curved transverse rows of white or bluish white spots, the proximal row composed of four spots in cellules 2—5 and the distal of six in cellules 2—7; small yellowish marginal spots. Hindwing above between veins 2 and 7 with a posteriorly pointed, sharply defined blue median band, in the middle about 5 mm. in breadth, accompanied by a whitish spot in cellule 7; behind the middle runs an S-shaped curved row of 6 small blue spots and near the distal margin a curved row of 6 or 7 bluish dots; the marginal lunules themselves are yellowish; the tails well developed, about 5 mm. in length. The under surface agrees almost exactly with that of cithaeron. The female closely resembles that of xiphares, but differs in having a transverse row of 8 white spots behind the middle of the forewing above and in the smaller, ochre-yellow median spot of the hindwing. British East Africa in the Kikuyu district; rare.

== Biology ==
The larvae feed on Drypetes gerrardii, Craibia brownii and Hippocratea africana.

The habitat is semi-dry and high forest.

Charaxes nandina is very closely related to Charaxes xiphares. It is sympatric with Charaxes cithaeron

== Taxonomy ==
Charaxes tiridates group

The supposed clade members are:

- Charaxes tiridates
- Charaxes numenes similar to next
- Charaxes bipunctatus similar to last
- Charaxes violetta
- Charaxes fuscus
- Charaxes mixtus
- Charaxes bubastis
- Charaxes albimaculatus
- Charaxes barnsi
- Charaxes bohemani
- Charaxes schoutedeni
- Charaxes monteiri
- Charaxes smaragdalis
- Charaxes xiphares
- Charaxes cithaeron
- Charaxes nandina
- Charaxes imperialis
- Charaxes ameliae
- Charaxes pythodoris
- ? Charaxes overlaeti

For a full list see Eric Vingerhoedt, 2013.
