= Charaxes overlaeti =

Scientific classification
- Domain: Eukaryota
- Kingdom: Animalia
- Phylum: Arthropoda
- Class: Insecta
- Order: Lepidoptera
- Family: Nymphalidae
- Subfamily: Charaxinae
- Tribe: Charaxini
- Genus: Charaxes
- Species: C. overlaeti

Binomial name
- Charaxes overlaeti Schouteden, 1934

Species of butterfly

Charaxes overlaeti is a butterfly in the family Nymphalidae. It is found in the Democratic Republic of the Congo and Kenya.

== Taxonomy ==
Known only from the holotype and a similar specimen captured in Kenya. Charaxes overlaeti may be a hybrid between Charaxes bohemani and Charaxes ameliae.

Charaxes tiridates group.

The supposed clade members are:

- Charaxes tiridates
- Charaxes numenes, similar to next
- Charaxes bipunctatus, similar to last
- Charaxes violetta
- Charaxes fuscus
- Charaxes mixtus
- Charaxes bubastis
- Charaxes albimaculatus
- Charaxes barnsi
- Charaxes bohemani
- Charaxes schoutedeni
- Charaxes monteiri
- Charaxes smaragdalis
- Charaxes xiphares
- Charaxes cithaeron
- Charaxes nandina
- Charaxes imperialis
- Charaxes ameliae
- Charaxes pythodoris
- ? Charaxes overlaeti

For a full list see Eric Vingerhoedt, 2013.
