= Charaxes pythodoris =

- Figures 18 and 19

Scientific classification
- Kingdom: Animalia
- Phylum: Arthropoda
- Clade: Pancrustacea
- Class: Insecta
- Order: Lepidoptera
- Family: Nymphalidae
- Subfamily: Charaxinae
- Tribe: Charaxini
- Genus: Charaxes
- Species: C. pythodoris

Binomial name
- Charaxes pythodoris Hewitson, 1873.

Synonyms
- Charaxes nesaea Grose-Smith, 1889; Charaxes pythodoris f. pallida Carpenter, 1934; Charaxes pythodoris f. geraldi Stoneham, 1964

Species of butterfly

Charaxes pythodoris, the powder-blue charaxes, is a butterfly in the family Nymphalidae. It is found in Sierra Leone, Ivory Coast, Ghana, Nigeria, Cameroon, Gabon, the Republic of the Congo, the Central African Republic, Angola, the Democratic Republic of the Congo, Ethiopia, Uganda, Kenya, Tanzania, Malawi and Zambia.

== Description ==
Ch. pythodoris. Distal margin of the hindwing uniformly rounded without tail-appendages, but shortly dentate at the extremities of the veins. Abdomen white above. Both wings above black (only the fore wing at the base of the costal margin brownish) with broad blue and white transverse band, which on the hindwing almost reaches the base, but is distally irregularly dentate and only extends a little beyond the apex of the cell. The transverse band of the forewing is similar to that of smaragdalis but begins at the middle of the hindmargin, forms large spots in la and lb and is then broken up into two spots each in cellules 2-—7. the distal ones blue and the proximal nearly white; the proximal spot in cellule 4 is placed much nearer to the base than the rest; forewing without marginal spots; hindwing with a row of small white or bluish submarginal dots, but its marginal spots indistinct or absent. Under surface almost uniform yellow-brown with fine black transverse streaks. — pythodoris Hew. has the black marginal band on the upperside of the hindwing narrower about 10mm. in breadth at vein 6; the blue transverse band of the forewing always undivided in cellules la and lb. Angola and the southern part of the Congo region. — In nesaea Smith the black marginal band on the upperside of the hindwing is broader, about 14 mm. in breadth at vein 6; the blue spot in cellule lb of the forewing usually more or less divided into two spots. German and British East Africa. — Both forms are very rare.

== Biology ==
The habitat consists of drier forests, riparian forests, heavy savanna and light arid savanna (where forest-crowned hills or thickets occur).

The larvae feed on Craibia brownii, Craibia laurentii, Craibia brevicaudata and Craibia affinis. Notes on the biology of pythodoris are given by Kielland (1990) and Larsen (1991).

== Taxonomy ==
Charaxes tiridates group.

The supposed clade members are:

- Charaxes tiridates
- Charaxes numenes - similar to next
- Charaxes bipunctatus - similar to last
- Charaxes violetta
- Charaxes fuscus
- Charaxes mixtus
- Charaxes bubastis
- Charaxes albimaculatus
- Charaxes barnsi
- Charaxes bohemani
- Charaxes schoutedeni
- Charaxes monteiri
- Charaxes smaragdalis
- Charaxes xiphares
- Charaxes cithaeron
- Charaxes nandina
- Charaxes imperialis
- Charaxes ameliae
- Charaxes pythodoris
- ? Charaxes overlaeti

For a full list see Eric Vingerhoedt, 2013.

== Subspecies ==
- C. p. pythodoris (Angola, north-western Zambia, Democratic Republic of the Congo, southern Ethiopia, Uganda, western Kenya, north-western Tanzania)
- C. p. davidi Plantrou, 1973 (Sierra Leone, Ivory Coast, Ghana)
- C. p. knoopae Plantrou, 1982 (western Nigeria)
- C. p. nesaea Grose-Smith, 1889 (coast of Kenya, north-eastern Tanzania) rare
- C. p. occidens van Someren, 1963 (Nigeria, Cameroon, Gabon, Congo, Central African Republic)
- C. p. pallida van Someren, 1963 (central Tanzania)
- C. p. sumbuensis Henning, 1982 (Zambia: southern Lake Tanganyika)
- C. p. ventersi Henning, 1982 (Malawi: gorges and valleys down the sides of the Zomba Plateau)
