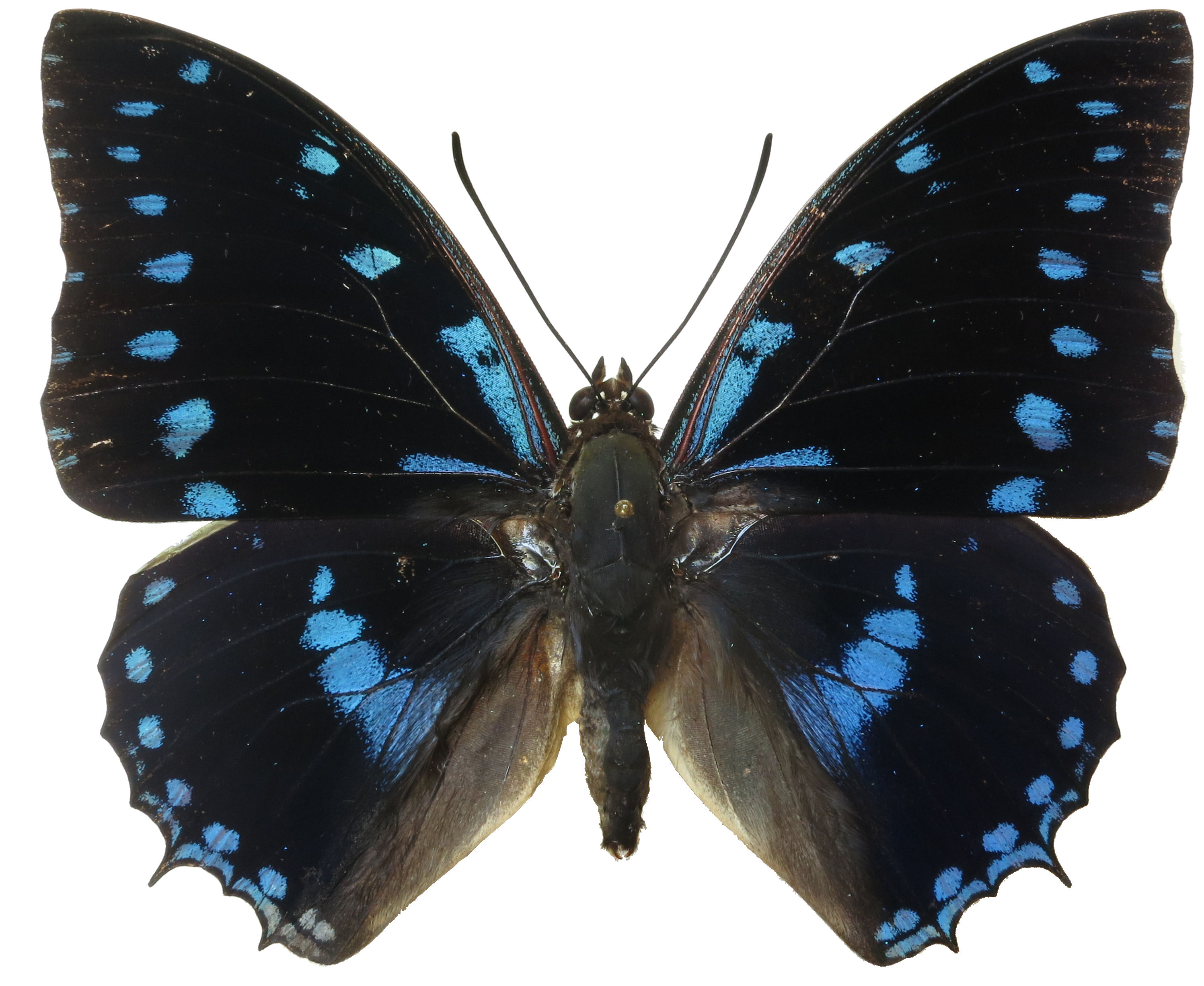
- Male from the CAR
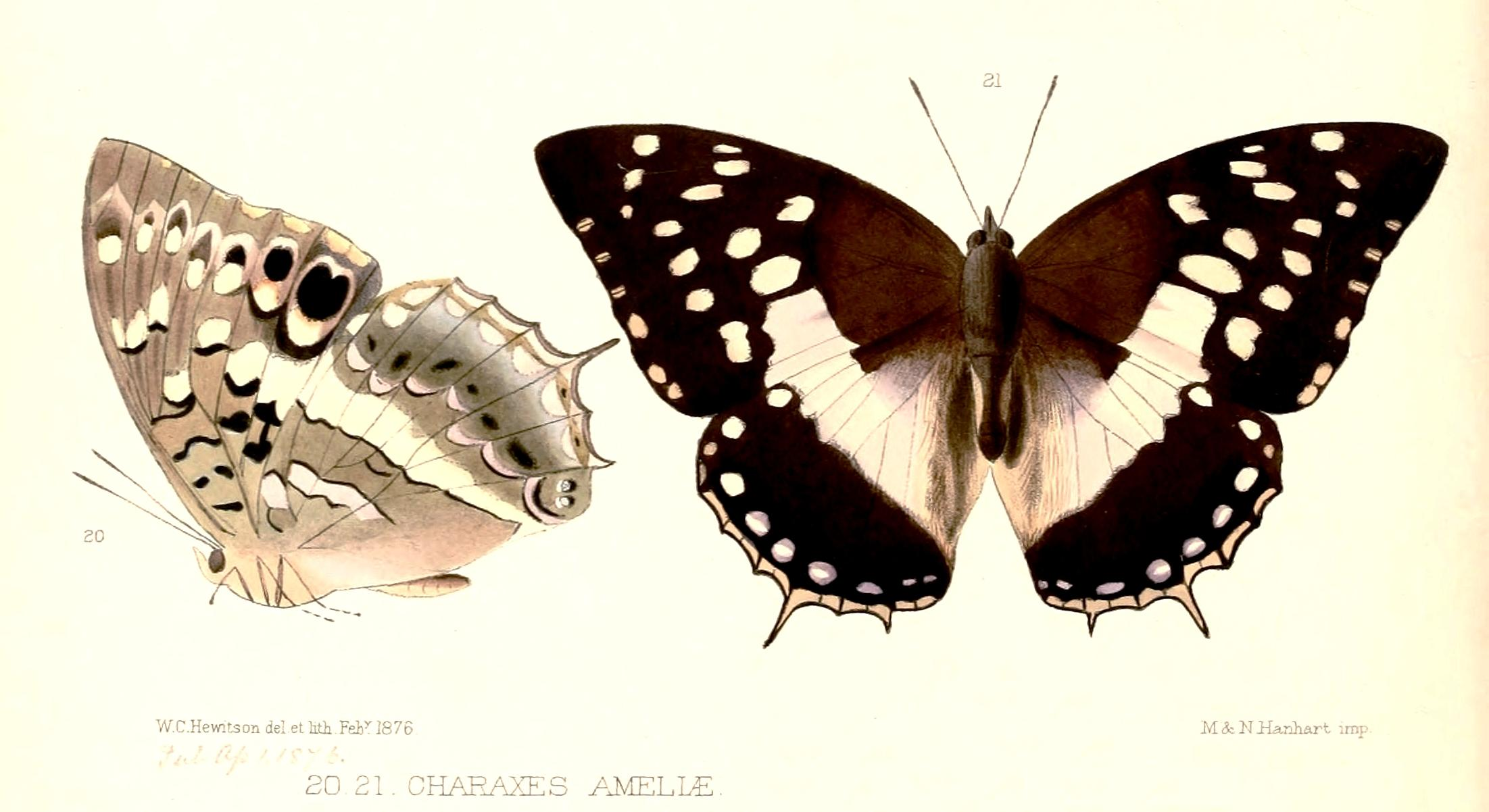
- Female

Scientific classification
- Kingdom: Animalia
- Phylum: Arthropoda
- Clade: Pancrustacea
- Class: Insecta
- Order: Lepidoptera
- Family: Nymphalidae
- Genus: Charaxes
- Species: C. ameliae

Binomial name
- Charaxes ameliae Doumet, 1861

Synonyms
- Charaxes regius Aurivillius, 1889

= Charaxes ameliae =

Species of butterfly

Charaxes ameliae, the blue-spotted charaxes, is a butterfly in the family Nymphalidae. It is found in Guinea, Sierra Leone, Liberia, Ivory Coast, Ghana, Togo, Nigeria, Cameroon, Gabon, the Republic of the Congo, the Central African Republic, the Democratic Republic of the Congo, Uganda, Kenya, Zambia, Tanzania and Malawi.

== Description ==
Ch. ameliae Doumet forewing above black with the following blue markings: a broad longitudinal streak in the cell, an angular spot at the apex of the cell, a spot behind the middle of the costal margin, 8 rather large submarginal spots and small marginal spots. On the hindwing an anteriorly narrowed median band, rounded submarginal spots and fine marginal streaks are blue. On the under surface the black transverse streaks in cellules 2, 4-7 are placed in an almost straight line and are distally accompanied by a whitish band. The female is much larger and has the ground-colour above black-brown and all the markings white or yellowish white. The cell of the forewing is unmarked; the median band of the hindwing reaches the inner margin, is basally widened and is continuous on the forewing as far as vein 2; the proximal spots of cellules 2–7, which in the male are almost all wanting, are here large and distinct, but the distal ones scarcely larger than on the underside of the hindwing the light median band is broader and more distinct. The tail at vein 2 is short in both sexes, much shorter than the one at vein 4. This magnificent species occurs every where in the West African forest-region and is distributed to Aruwimi and to Nyassaland. In 1900, a full description was given by Walter Rothschild and Karl Jordan in Novitates Zoologicae. See volume 7:287-524 pages 391-394 (for terms see volume 5:545-601).

== Biology ==
The habitat consists of Afrotropical forests and Brachystegia woodland (Miombo).

The larvae feed on Brachystegia spiciformis, Julbernardia globiflora, Albizia adianthifolia and Baikiaea insignis.

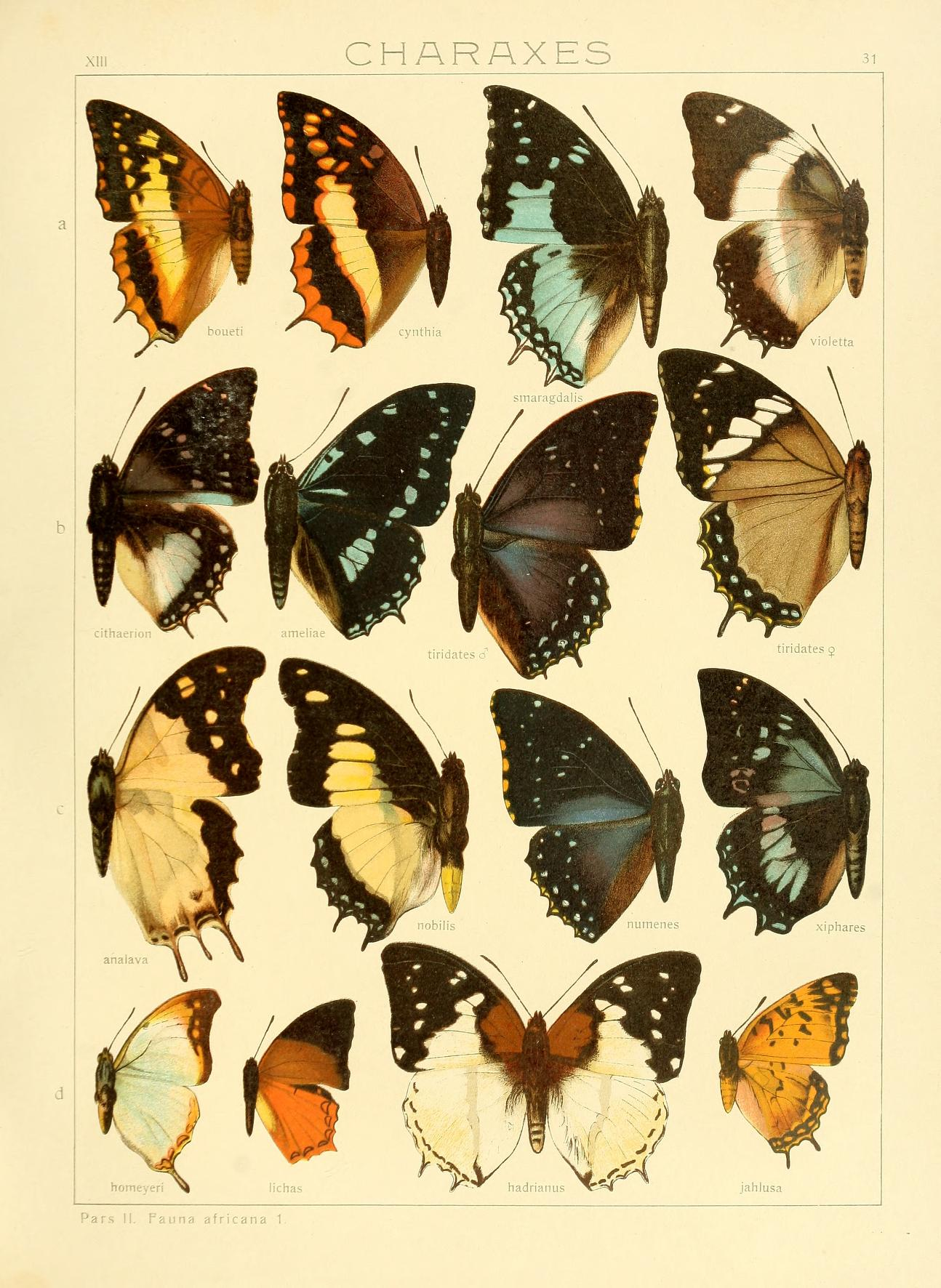
In Adalbert Seitz's Fauna Africana

== Taxonomy ==
Charaxes tiridates group

The supposed clade members are:

- Charaxes tiridates
- Charaxes numenes similar to next
- Charaxes bipunctatus similar to last
- Charaxes violetta
- Charaxes fuscus
- Charaxes mixtus
- Charaxes bubastis
- Charaxes albimaculatus
- Charaxes barnsi
- Charaxes bohemani
- Charaxes schoutedeni
- Charaxes monteiri
- Charaxes smaragdalis
- Charaxes xiphares
- Charaxes cithaeron
- Charaxes nandina
- Charaxes imperialis
- Charaxes ameliae
- Charaxes pythodoris
- ? Charaxes overlaeti

For a full list see Eric Vingerhoedt, 2013.

== Subspecies ==
- C. a. ameliae (Nigeria, Cameroon, Gabon, Congo, Central African Republic, Democratic Republic of the Congo)
- C. a. amelina Joicey & Talbot, 1925(Tanzania: Kigoma, Malawi, northern Zambia, Democratic Republic of the Congo: Shaba)
- C. a. doumeti Henning, 1989 (Guinea, Sierra Leone, Liberia, Ivory Coast, Ghana, Togo, western Nigeria)
- C. a. victoriae van Someren, 1972 Uganda, western Kenya, north-western Tanzania)

Torben Larsen developed a species numbering system for his 2005 publication Butterflies of West Africa. The subspecies doumeti is #746. The 'Larsen' numbers have since been used with permission in A Sharp Eye on Butterflies of Ghana.
