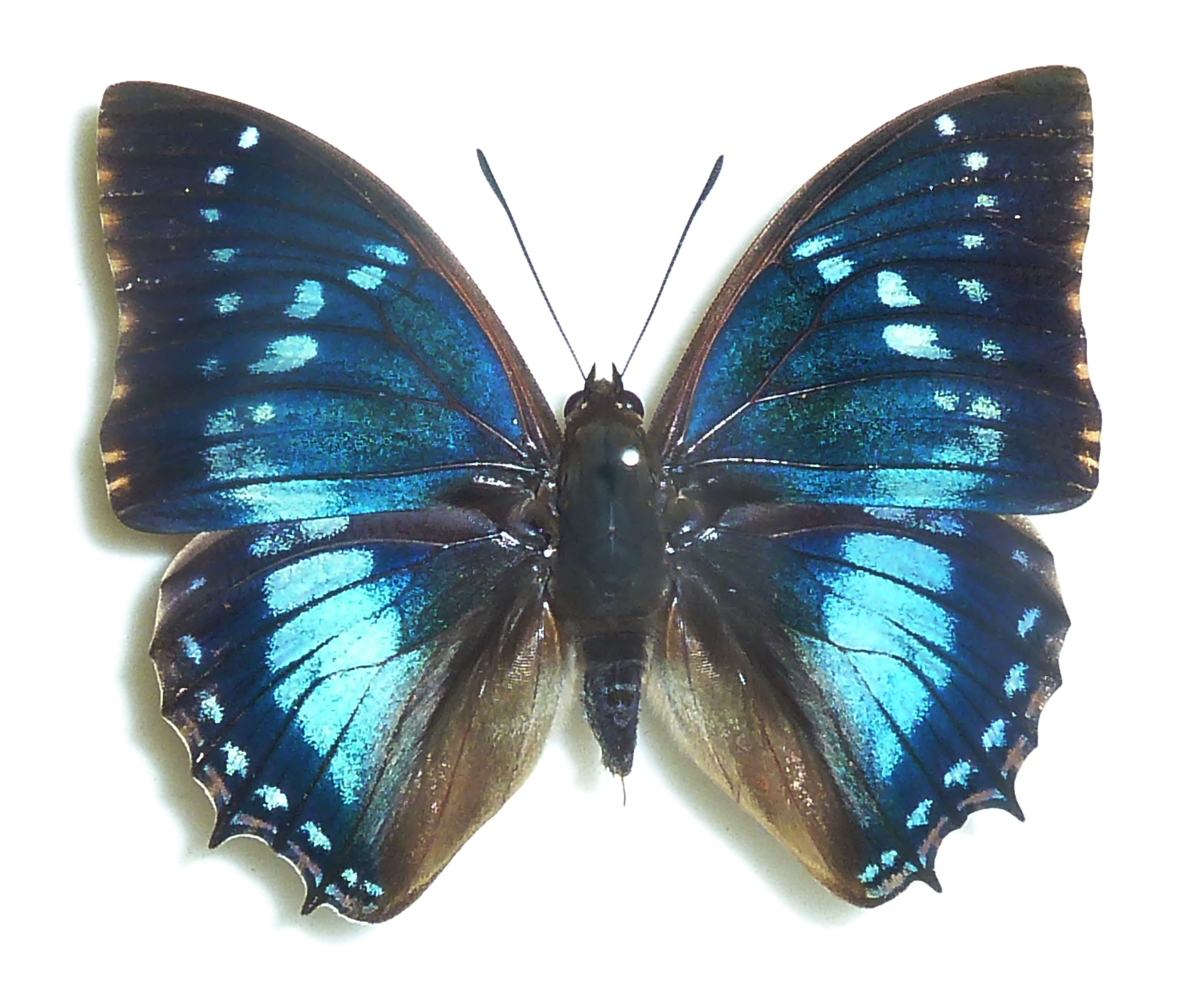
- Male

Scientific classification
- Domain: Eukaryota
- Kingdom: Animalia
- Phylum: Arthropoda
- Class: Insecta
- Order: Lepidoptera
- Family: Nymphalidae
- Genus: Charaxes
- Species: C. xiphares

Binomial name
- Charaxes xiphares (Stoll, [1781])

Synonyms
- Papilio xiphares Stoll, 1781; Charaxes xiphares bavenda f. ochremacula van Son, 1935; Charaxes xiphares bavenda f. cyanescens van Son, 1935; Charaxes cithaeron var. brevicaudatus Schultze, 1914; Charaxes desmondi van Someren, 1939; Charaxes xiphares draconis f. candida van Son, 1953; Charaxes xiphares kenwayi f. lutea van Son, 1953; Charaxes kulal van Someren, 1962; Charaxes maudei Joicey & Talbot, 1918; Charaxes xiphares xiphares f. occidentalis van Son, 1953; Charaxes xiphares penningtoni f. luminosa van Son, 1953; Charaxes xiphares staudei f. arikae Henning and Henning, 1992; Charaxes xiphares staudei f. louisae Henning and Henning, 1992; Papilio thyestes Stoll, 1790; Charaxes xiphares reducta Rothschild, 1929; Charaxes xiphares elatias Jordan, 1936; Charaxes xiphares walwandi f. namukanae Collins, 1989 in Henning, 1989

= Charaxes xiphares =

Forest king emperor

Species of butterfly

Charaxes xiphares, the forest king emperor or forest king charaxes, is a butterfly of the family Nymphalidae. It is native to Afromontane forest in the eastern and southern Afrotropical realm.

== Description ==
The wingspan is 65–80 mm for males and 70–95 mm for females. Ch. xiphares Cr. male: the forewing marked almost exactly as in nandina, but the spots blue with the exception of the first two in the distal row; the basal part is tinged with blue, but usually not so distinctly as in the figure. The blue median band of the hindwing is placed further distad, is broader and distally deeply incised at the veins or even almost broken up into spots; small blue submarginal dots and blue or yellowish marginal spots. The female is very different from the male; the forewing is brown-black without blue markings, but with four white discal spots (in the middle of cellule 2, before the middle of 3 and at the base of 4 and 5) and 2 or more white spots behind the middle; small yellowish marginal spots in cellules lb and 2. The hindwing above in the middle between veins 2 and 7 with a very broad (about 15 mm.) ochre-yellow transverse band, distally irrorated with dark, which covers the basal half of cellules 2–6; streak-like blue submarginal spots and narrow yellowish marginal streaks. On the under surface the light spots of the forewing are larger and the hindwing has in the middle an irregular white band, proximally bordered with yellowish; the female is much larger than the Cape Colony, Kaffirland, Natal and Transvaal. Larva green with two whitish, red-centred and black-margined dorsal spots, the larger on segment 6 and the smaller on segment 8.

== Biology ==
The larvae feed on Craibia brevecaudata, Scutia myrtina, Rhamnus prinoides, Cryptocarya woodii, Chaetachme aristata, and Drypetes gerrardii.

== Subspecies ==
Listed alphabetically:

- C. x. bavenda van Son, 1935 – South Africa: Soutpansberg in Limpopo province
- C. x. bergeri Plantrou, 1975 – DRC
- C. x. brevicaudatus Schultze, 1914 – southern Tanzania
- C. x. burgessi van Son, 1953 – DRC: Kivu, south-western Uganda, Rwanda, Burundi
- C. x. desmondi van Someren, 1936 – Kenya: south-east to the Taita Hills
- C. x. draconis Jordan, 1936 – Eswatini and South Africa: Mpumalanga province
- C. x. kenwayi Poulton, 1929 – South Africa: north-eastern Limpopo province
- C. x. kiellandi Plantrou, 1976 – northern Tanzania
- C. x. kilimensis van Someren, 1972 – northern Tanzania
- C. x. kulal van Someren, 1962 – Kenya: north to Mount Kulal
- C. x. ludovici Rousseau-Decelle, 1933 – northern Malawi, north-eastern Zambia
- C. x. maudei Joicey & Talbot, 1917 – north-eastern Tanzania
- C. x. nguru Collins, 1988 – eastern Tanzania
- C. x. occidentalis Pringle, 1995 – South Africa: Western Cape province
- C. x. penningtoni van Son, 1953 – South Africa: KwaZulu-Natal province
- C. x. sitebi Plantou, 1981 – north-western Tanzania
- C. x. staudei Henning & Henning, 1992 – South Africa: north-east and north-west slopes of Blouberg in Limpopo province
- C. x. thyestes (Stoll, 1790) – South Africa: Eastern Cape province
- C. x. upembana Plantrou, 1976 – DRC
- C. x. vumbui van Son, 1936 – eastern Zimbabwe
- C. x. walwandi Collins, 1989 – Kenya, Tanzania
- C. x. wernickei Joicey & Talbot, 1926 – Cameroon
- C. x. woodi van Someren, 1964 – southern Malawi
- C. x. xiphares (Stoll, [1781]) – South Africa: Eastern Cape and Western Cape provinces

== Taxonomy ==
Charaxes tiridates group.

the supposed clade members are:

- Charaxes tiridates
- Charaxes numenes – similar to next
- Charaxes bipunctatus – similar to last
- Charaxes violetta
- Charaxes fuscus
- Charaxes mixtus
- Charaxes bubastis
- Charaxes albimaculatus
- Charaxes barnsi
- Charaxes bohemani
- Charaxes schoutedeni
- Charaxes monteiri
- Charaxes smaragdalis
- Charaxes xiphares
- Charaxes cithaeron
- Charaxes nandina
- Charaxes imperialis
- Charaxes ameliae
- Charaxes pythodoris
- ? Charaxes overlaeti

For a full list see Eric Vingerhoedt, 2013.
