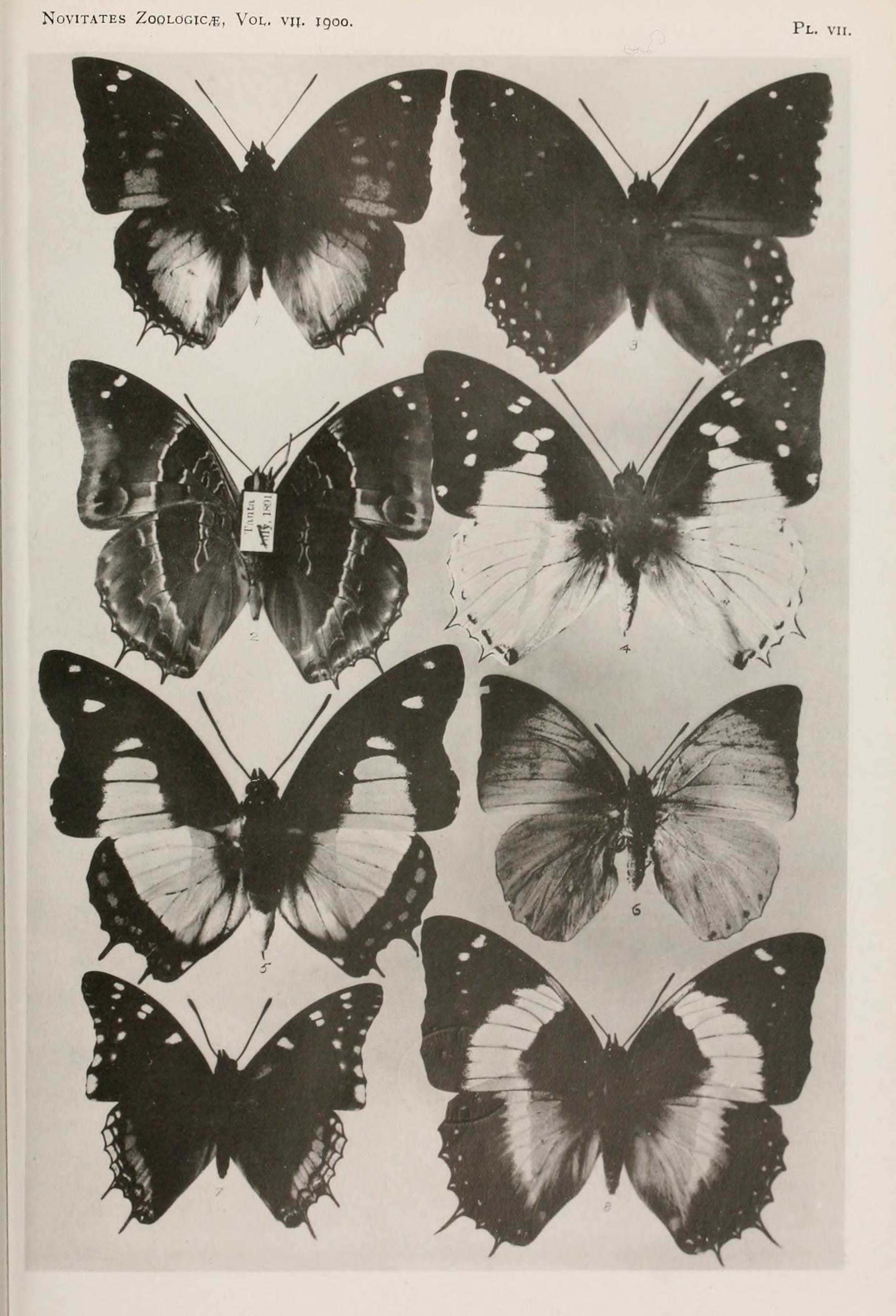
- Male figures 1 and 2, female figure 8

Scientific classification
- Kingdom: Animalia
- Phylum: Arthropoda
- Clade: Pancrustacea
- Class: Insecta
- Order: Lepidoptera
- Family: Nymphalidae
- Genus: Charaxes
- Species: C. violetta

Binomial name
- Charaxes violetta Grose-Smith, 1885.

= Charaxes violetta =

Violet-spotted emperor

Species of butterfly

Charaxes violetta, the violet-spotted emperor or violet-spotted charaxes, is a butterfly of the family Nymphalidae. It is found in southern Africa.

Species is double brooded from August to October and April to June.

Larvae feed on Blighia unijugata and Deinbollia species.

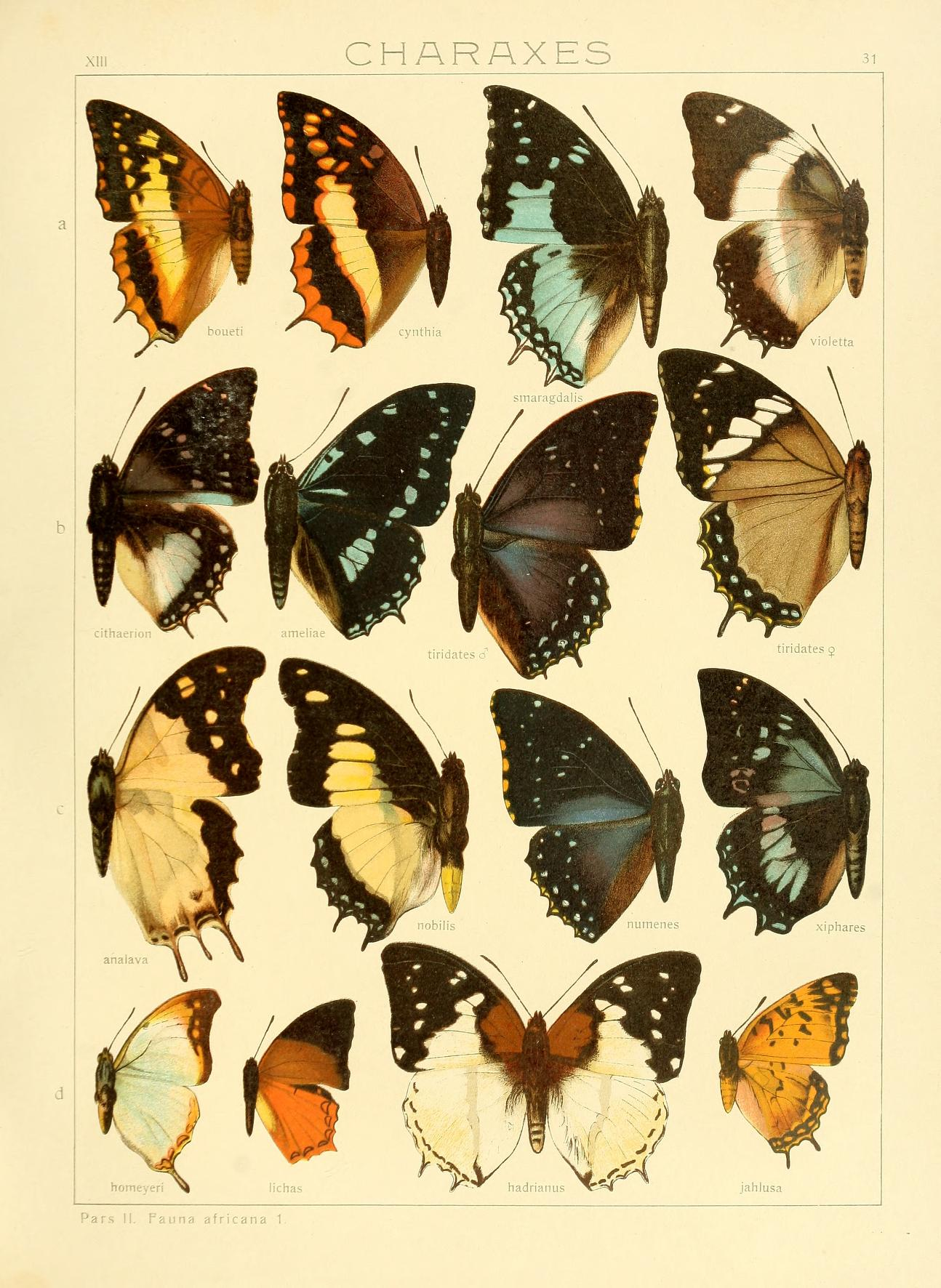
In Adalbert Seitz's Fauna Africana

== Full description ==
The wingspan is 65–70 mm for males and 75–85 mm for females. Both sexes above almost exactly like the corresponding sexes of cithaeron, but differing in the presence of a fine, nearly straight transverse line in the middle of the hindwing beneath, distally margined with white, in the male narrowly, in the female for a breadth of 2–3 mm. Delagoa Bay to Nyassaland and Mombasa.Larva green, sprinkled with minute yellowish dots; horns on the head bluish or violet; the dorsal spots grey or rust-coloured.

- Walter Rothschild and Karl Jordan, 1900 Novitates Zoologicae volume 7:287-524. page 372 for terms see volume 5:545-601 .

== Subspecies ==
Listed alphabetically:

- C. v. maritima van Someren, 1966 (coast of Kenya, Tanzania: north-east to the coast)
- C. v. melloni Fox, 1963 (Mozambique, eastern Zimbabwe, Malawi, eastern Tanzania)
- C. v. meru van Someren, 1966 (Kenya: north-eastern slopes of Mount Kenya and in the Njombeni Hills)
- C. v. violetta Grose-Smith, 1885 (southern Mozambique, South Africa: KwaZulu-Natal)

== Realm ==
Afrotropical realm

== Taxonomy ==
Charaxes tiridates group.

The supposed clade members are:

- Charaxes tiridates
- Charaxes numenes - similar to next
- Charaxes bipunctatus - similar to last
- Charaxes violetta
- Charaxes fuscus
- Charaxes mixtus
- Charaxes bubastis
- Charaxes albimaculatus
- Charaxes barnsi
- Charaxes bohemani
- Charaxes schoutedeni
- Charaxes monteiri
- Charaxes smaragdalis
- Charaxes xiphares
- Charaxes cithaeron
- Charaxes nandina
- Charaxes imperialis
- Charaxes ameliae
- Charaxes pythodoris
- ? Charaxes overlaeti

For a full list see Eric Vingerhoedt, 2013.
