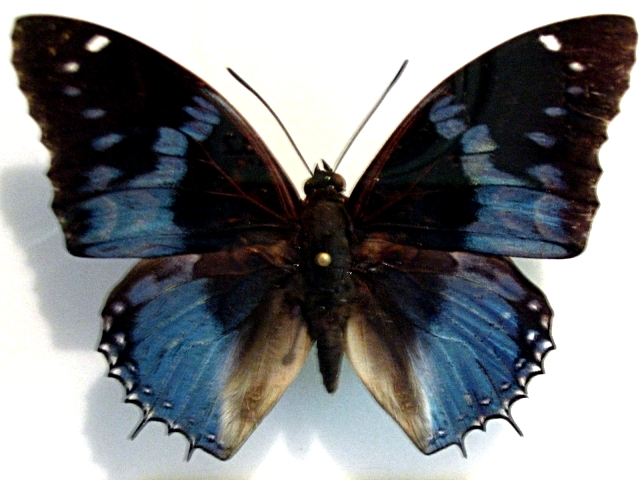

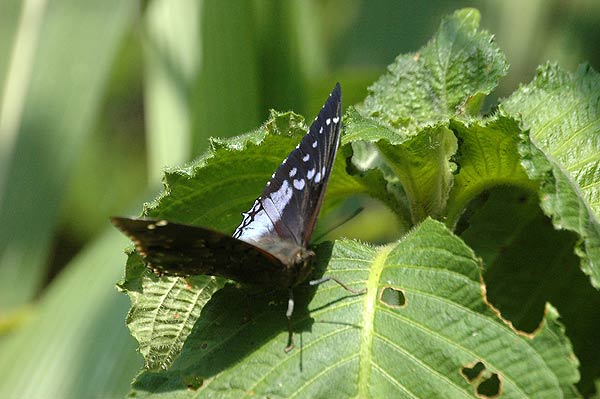

Scientific classification
- Kingdom: Animalia
- Phylum: Arthropoda
- Clade: Pancrustacea
- Class: Insecta
- Order: Lepidoptera
- Family: Nymphalidae
- Subfamily: Charaxinae
- Tribe: Charaxini
- Genus: Charaxes
- Species: C. smaragdalis

Binomial name
- Charaxes smaragdalis Butler, [1866]

Synonyms
- Charaxes smaragdalis f. schoutedeni Ghesquière, 1933; Charaxes princeps Butler, 1896; Charaxes smaragdalis orientalis Joicey & Talbot, 1918 (preocc. Lanz, 1896); Charaxes smaragdalis smaragdalis f. beni van Someren, 1964; Charaxes smaragdalis leopoldi f. pseudobohemani Plantrou, 1979; Charaxes smaragdalis f. caerulea Carpenter and Jackson, 1950

= Charaxes smaragdalis =

Species of butterfly

Charaxes smaragdalis, the western blue charaxes, is a butterfly of the family Nymphalidae. It is found from Senegal to Somalia, from Angola to Kenya and from Sudan to Egypt.

The butterfly's wingspan is 85 to 100 mm.

== Description ==
Ch. smaragdalis Btlr. Both wings above from the base to the apex of the cell black with greenish or bluish reflection, then follows in the male a blue half-band, about 10 mm. in breadth, between the hindmargin and vein 2 or 3 and in each cellule from 3—7 two very widely separated spots, all blue except the distal ones in cellules 6 and 7; in the female there is in the middle a white transverse band, 7 mm. in breadth, running obliquely from the costal margin towards the hinder angle and reaching vein 1; the outer row of spots, which runs almost parallel with the distal margin in the male, is almost identical in the female. The hindwing has behind the apex of the cell a blue transverse band 12 (male)—15 (female) mm. in breadth and is black at the distal margin with blue-white submarginal spots and marginal line. The under surface is dark grey-brown, marked almost as in bohemanni. Niger to Angola and Uganda. — The blue transverse band on the upperside of the hindwing is narrower and everywhere completely separated from the blue marginal line. Sierra Leone to the Gold Coast. See External links for the original description by Arthur Gardiner Butler published in 1866 in The Proceedings of the Scientific Meetings of the Zoological Society of London.

== Biology ==
Its habitat is (lowland rainforest in the west, gallery forest in the south, and patches of lowland and montane forest in the east).

== Taxonomy ==
Charaxes tiridates group.

The supposed clade members are:

- Charaxes tiridates
- Charaxes numenes - similar to next
- Charaxes bipunctatus - similar to last
- Charaxes violetta
- Charaxes fuscus
- Charaxes mixtus
- Charaxes bubastis
- Charaxes albimaculatus
- Charaxes barnsi
- Charaxes bohemani
- Charaxes schoutedeni
- Charaxes monteiri
- Charaxes smaragdalis
- Charaxes xiphares
- Charaxes cithaeron
- Charaxes nandina
- Charaxes imperialis
- Charaxes ameliae
- Charaxes pythodoris
- ? Charaxes overlaeti

For a full list see Eric Vingerhoedt, 2013.

== Subspecies ==
- C. s. smaragdalis (Nigeria, Cameroon, Gabon, Central African Republic, Congo, Zaire)
- C. s. butleri Rothschild, 1900 (Sierra Leone, Ivory Coast, Liberia)
- C. s. caerulea Carpenter & Jackson, 1950 (eastern Zaire, south-western Uganda)
- C. s. elgonae van Someren, 1964 (Uganda)
- C. s. gobyae Plantrou, 1988C. s. gobyae Plantrou, 1988 (south-eastern Sudan)
- C. s. homonymus Bryk, F. 1939 (south-west Kenya, north Tanzania)
- C. s. kagera van Someren, 1964 (north-western Tanzania, south-western Uganda)
- C. s. kigoma van Someren, 1964 (Tanzania)
- C. s. leopoldi Ghesquière, 1933(northern Angola, eastern Congo, south-western Zaire)
- C. s. metu van Someren, 1964 (south-western Sudan, northern Uganda)
- C. s. toro van Someren, 1964 (western Uganda)
- C. s. allardi Bouyer & Vingerhoedt, 1997

Torben Larsen developed a species numbering system for his 2005 publication Butterflies of West Africa. The subspecies butleri is #744. The 'Larsen' numbers have since been used with permission in A Sharp Eye on Butterflies of Ghana.
