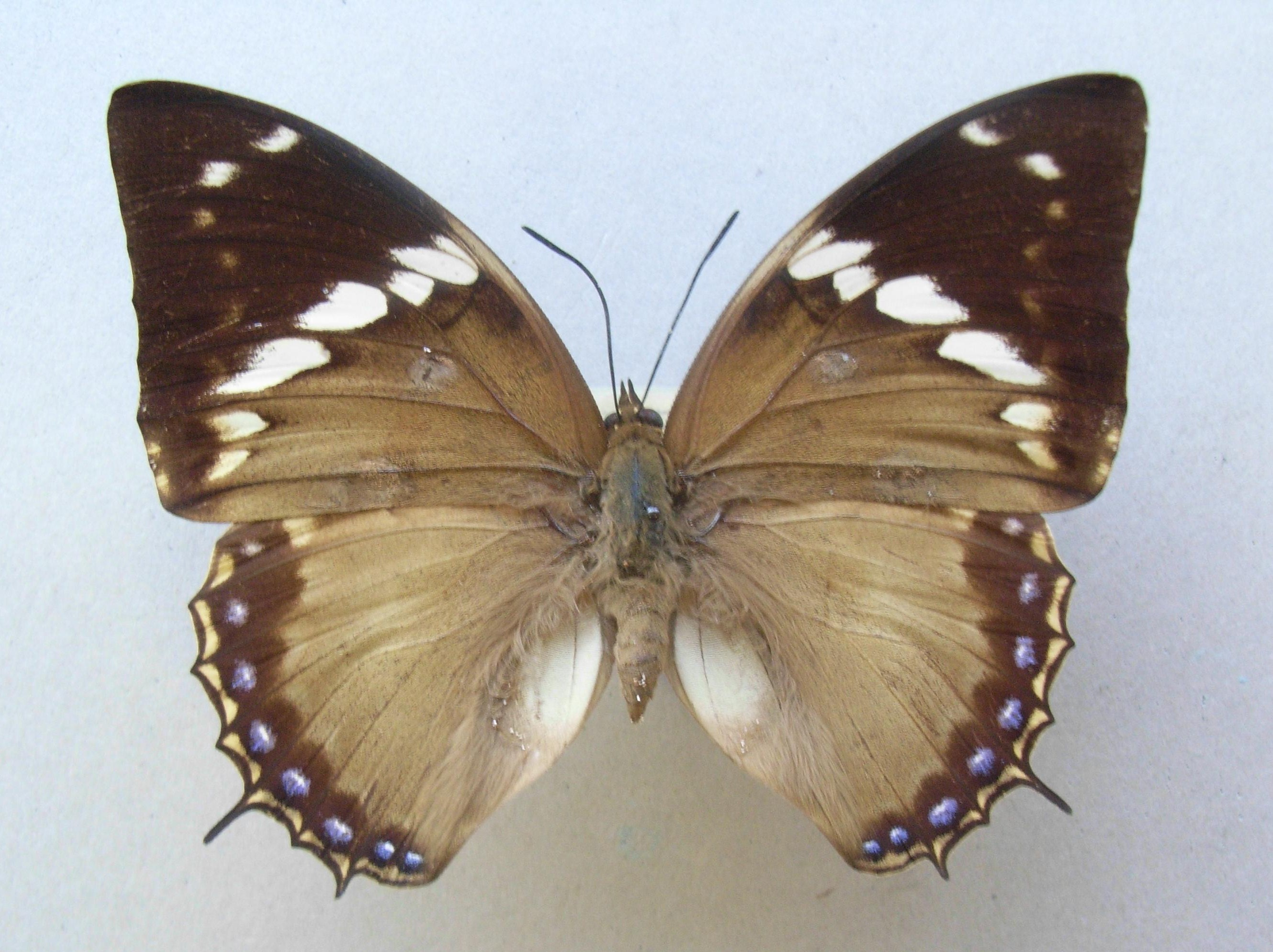
- Female, upperside
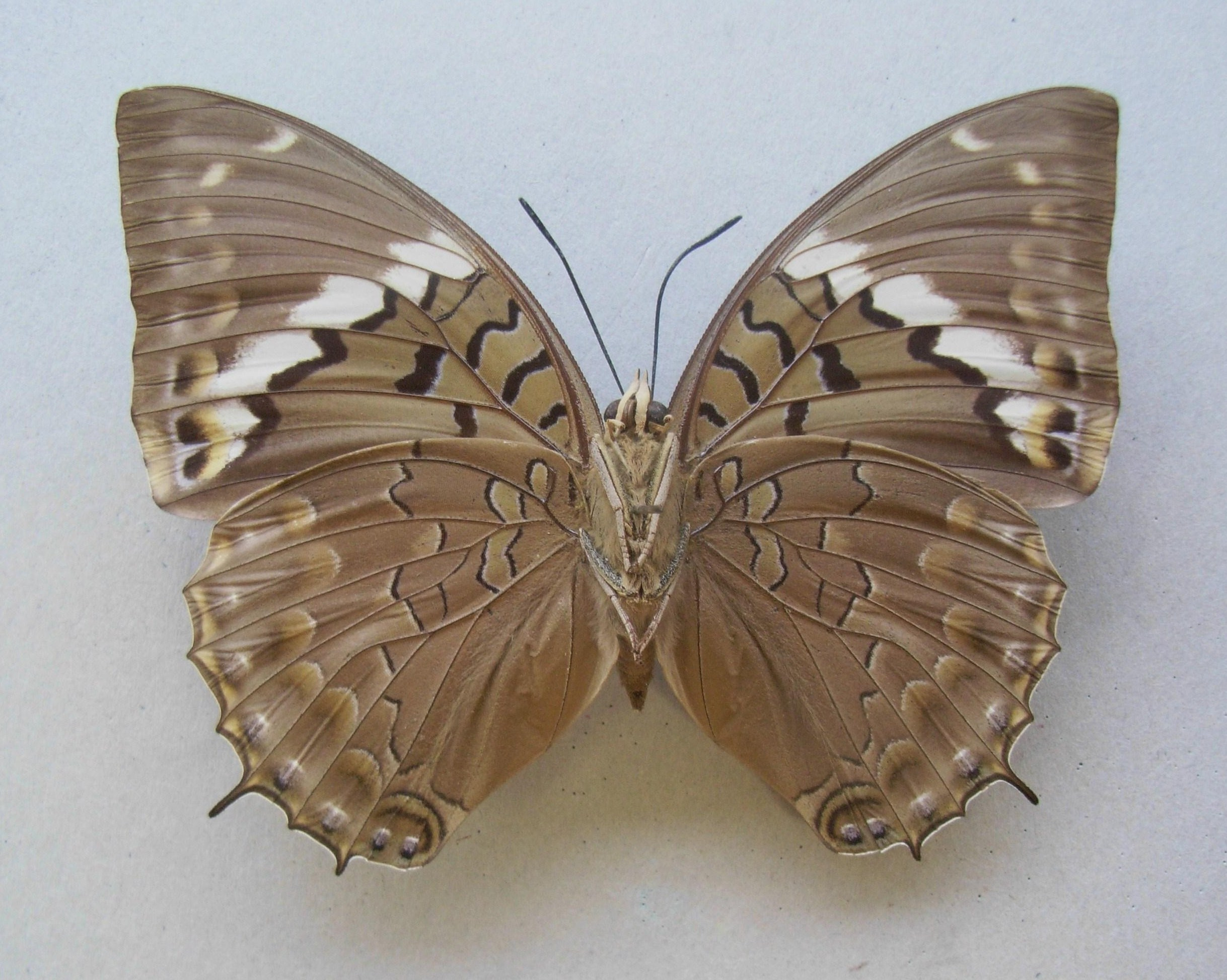
- Female, underside

Scientific classification
- Kingdom: Animalia
- Phylum: Arthropoda
- Clade: Pancrustacea
- Class: Insecta
- Order: Lepidoptera
- Family: Nymphalidae
- Subfamily: Charaxinae
- Tribe: Charaxini
- Genus: Charaxes
- Species: C. tiridates

Binomial name
- Charaxes tiridates (Cramer, 1777)

Synonyms
- Papilio tiridates Cramer, 1777; Papilio marica Fabricius, 1793; Charaxes tiridatinus Röber, 1936; Charaxes tiridates ab. tristis Schultze, 1914; Charaxes angusticaudatus Röber, 1936; Charaxes tiridates f. purpurina Rousseau-Decelle, 1938; Charaxes lucretius f. alberici Dufrane, 1945; Charaxes tiridates ab. conjuncta Storace, 1948; Charaxes tiridates ab. subcaerulea Storace, 1948; Charaxes hysginus Darge, 1978

= Charaxes tiridates =

Common blue charaxes

Species of butterfly

Charaxes tiridates, the common blue charaxes, is a butterfly in the family Nymphalidae. It is found in Senegal, Guinea, Burkina Faso, Sierra Leone, Liberia, Ivory Coast, Ghana, Togo, Benin, Nigeria, Equatorial Guinea, Cameroon, Gabon, the Republic of the Congo, the Democratic Republic of the Congo, the Central African Republic, Sudan, Ethiopia, Uganda, Rwanda, Burundi, Kenya, Tanzania, Angola and Zambia. The habitat consists of lowland evergreen forests and dense savanna.

The larvae feed on Phialodiscus unijugatus, Hugonia platysepala, Hugonia castaneifolia, Bombax reflexum, Chaetacme aristata, Celtis africana, Celtis durandi, Grewia tricocarpa, Grewia mollis, Afzelia africana, Flacourtia indica, Indigofera macrophylla, Osyris lanceolata, Blighia unijugata, Grewia forbesi, Bombax buonopozense, Albizia, Berlinia, Lonchocarpus, Hibiscus (including Hibiscus calyphyllus), Trema, Cassia, Dalbergia, Macrolobium, Millettia and Pterocarpus species.

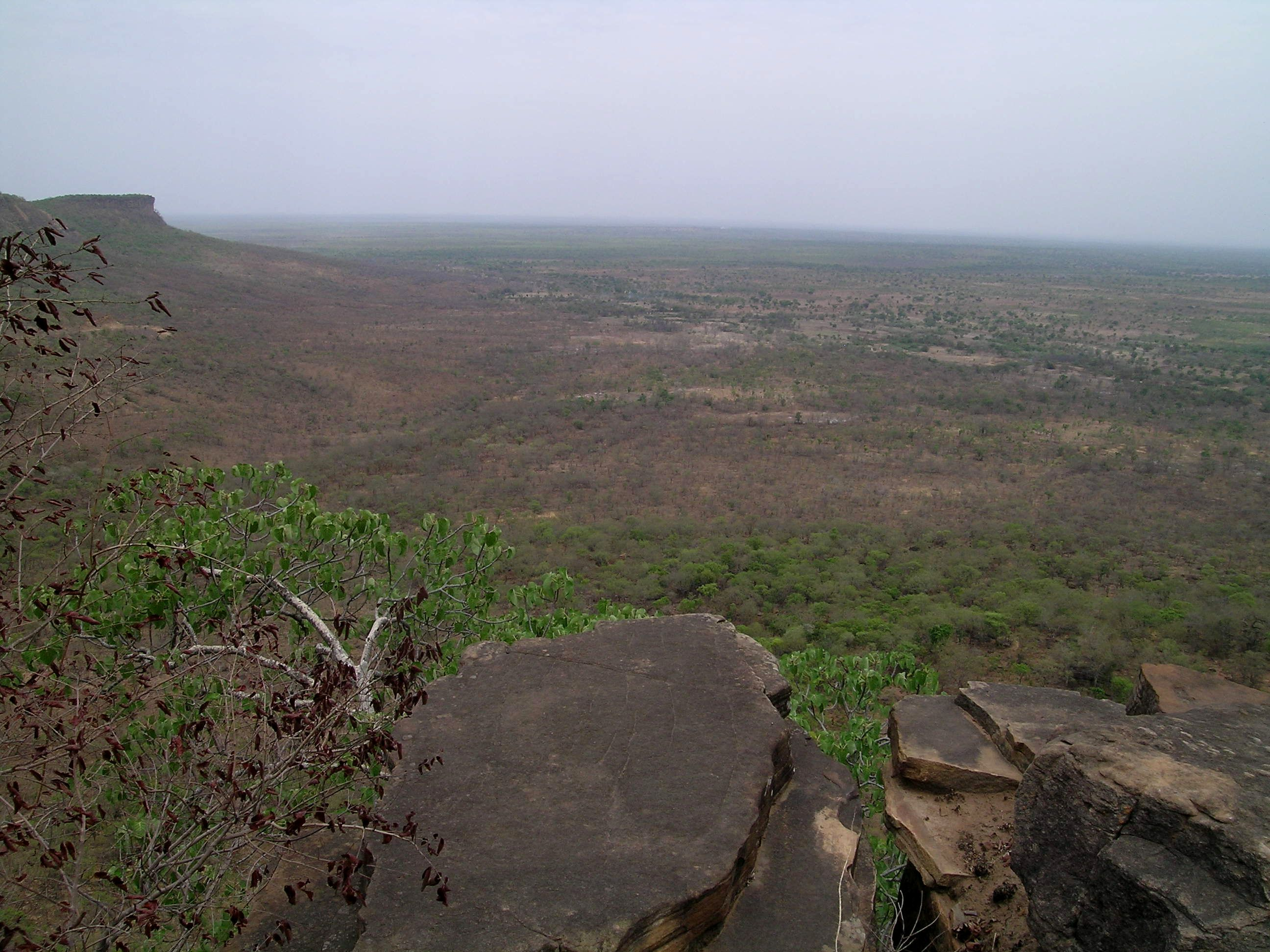
Savanna forest mosaic in Ghana

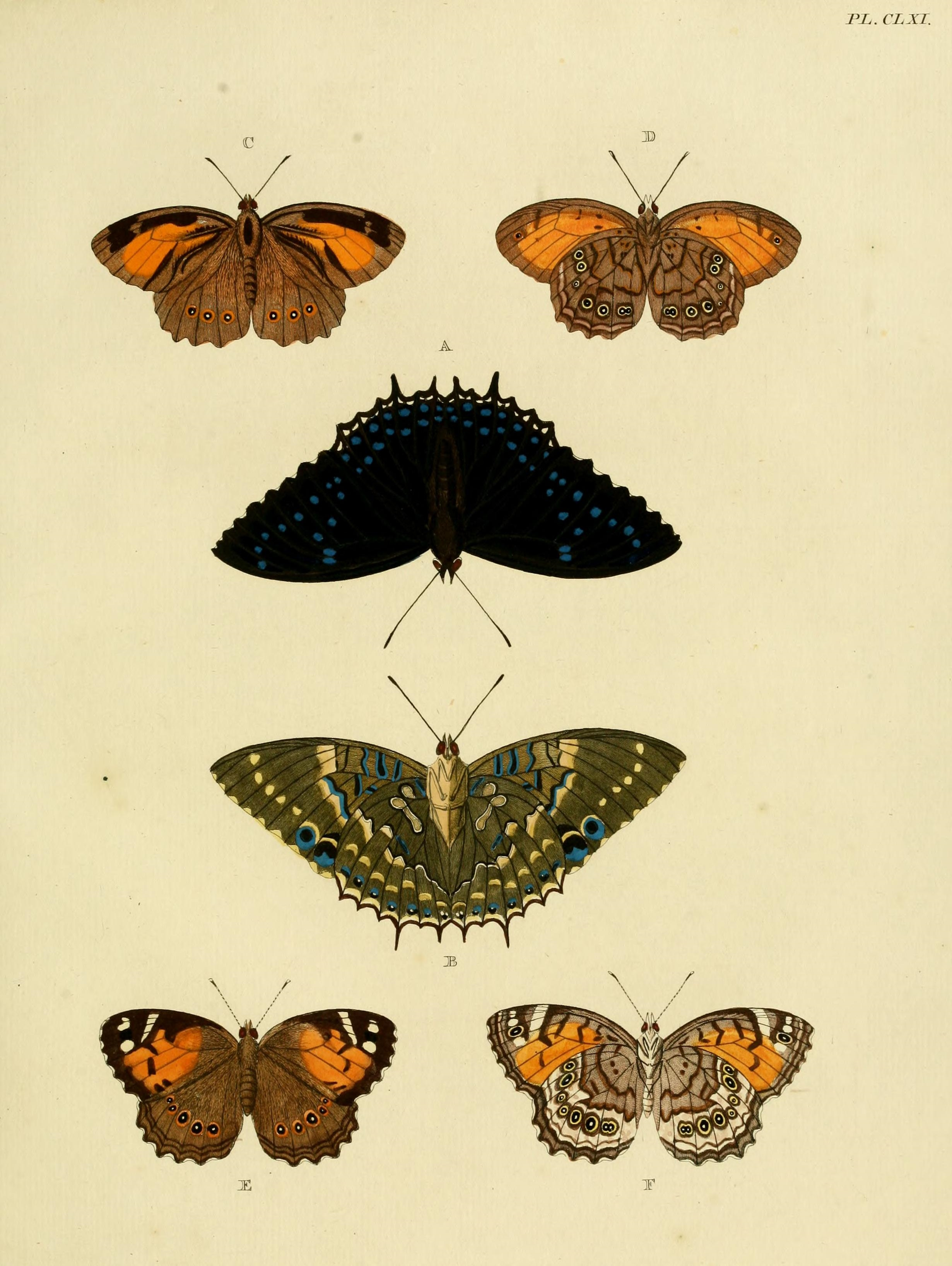
Original illustration in Pieter Cramer and Caspar Stoll's Uitlandsche Kapellen, male

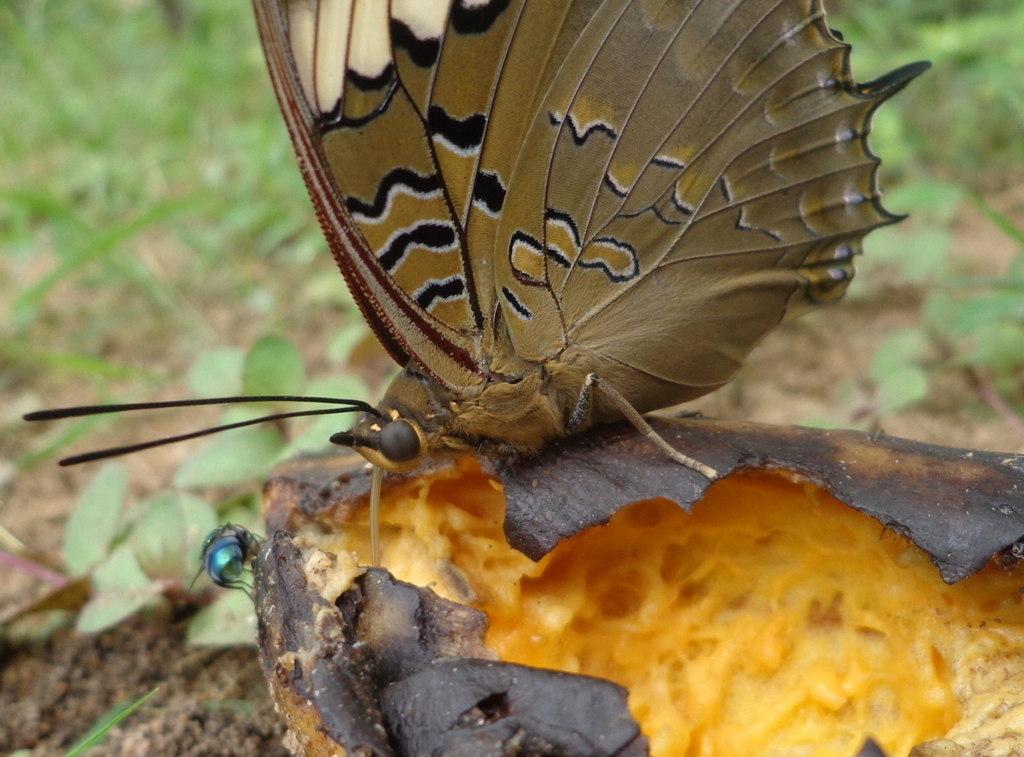
Feeding on fermented plantain in a fruit garden. Port Harcourt, Nigeria

== Description ==
Male upperside forewings have a black ground colour glossed blue. There is a discal arc of five or so spots and a postdiscal sinuous line of eight to ten spots. These spots are light blue and slightly metallic. The margin has pale amorphous lunules. The hindwing has two postdiscal rows of the light blue spots, the second close to the margin which has pale more lineate lunules. There are two short tails.

The female upperside has light brown basal areas, more extensive on the hindwing. There is a discal band of white marks just inside the much darker distal part of the forewing and two apical white spots. On the hindwing the dark area is narrow has seven or so light blue and slightly metallic spots with some white scales. There are pale marginal lunules and one long and one short tail.

The underside wings are variously light brown with black pattern lines and in the female only a white discal band.

A full description is given by Walter Rothschild and Karl Jordan, 1900 Novitates Zoologicae Volume 7:287-524. page 354 for terms see Volume 5:545-601

== Taxonomy ==
Charaxes tiridates group.

The supposed clade members are:

- Charaxes tiridates
- Charaxes numenes - similar to next
- Charaxes bipunctatus - similar to last
- Charaxes violetta
- Charaxes fuscus
- Charaxes mixtus
- Charaxes bubastis
- Charaxes albimaculatus
- Charaxes barnsi
- Charaxes bohemani
- Charaxes schoutedeni
- Charaxes monteiri
- Charaxes smaragdalis
- Charaxes xiphares
- Charaxes cithaeron
- Charaxes nandina
- Charaxes imperialis
- Charaxes ameliae
- Charaxes pythodoris
- ? Charaxes overlaeti

For a full list see Eric Vingerhoedt, 2013.

== Subspecies ==
- Charaxes tiridates tiridates (eastern Senegal, Guinea, Burkina Faso, Sierra Leone, Liberia, Ivory Coast, Ghana, Togo, Benin, western Nigeria)
- Charaxes tiridates choveti Turlin, 1998 (Bioko)
- Charaxes tiridates marginatus Rothschild & Jordan, 1903 (western and south-western Ethiopia)
- Charaxes tiridates tiridatinus Röber, 1936 (Nigeria, Cameroon, Gabon, Congo, western and southern Democratic Republic of the Congo, Central African Republic, Sudan, Uganda, Rwanda, Burundi, western Kenya, north-western Tanzania, Angola, northern Zambia)

Torben Larsen developed a species numbering system for his 2005 publication Butterflies of West Africa. The nominate subspecies is #741. The 'Larsen' numbers have since been used with permission in A Sharp Eye on Butterflies of Ghana.
