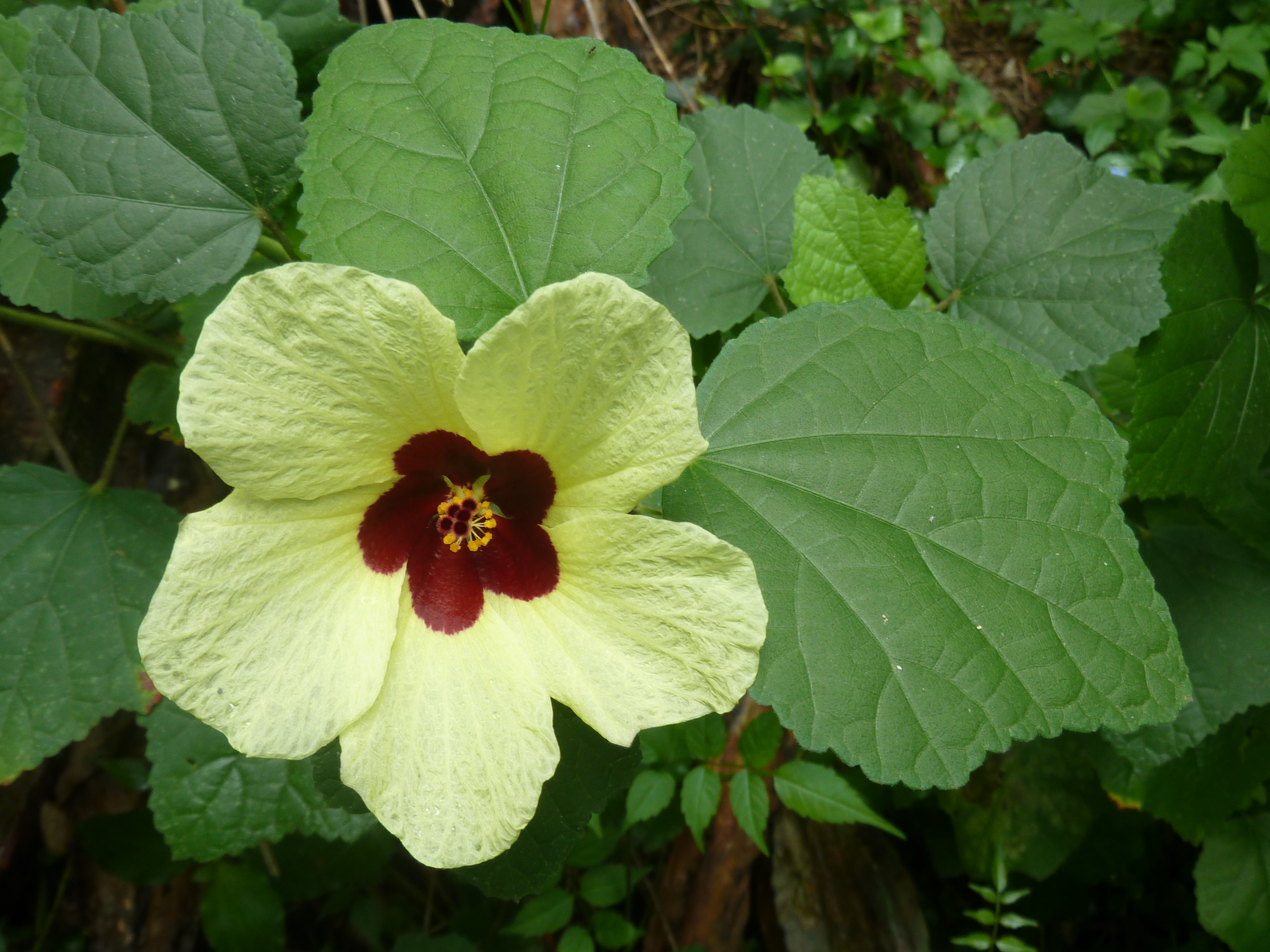

Conservation status
- Least Concern (IUCN 3.1)

Scientific classification
- Kingdom: Plantae
- Clade: Embryophytes
- Clade: Tracheophytes
- Clade: Spermatophytes
- Clade: Angiosperms
- Clade: Eudicots
- Clade: Rosids
- Order: Malvales
- Family: Malvaceae
- Genus: Hibiscus
- Species: H. calyphyllus

Binomial name
- Hibiscus calyphyllus Cav.

= Hibiscus calyphyllus =

Species of flowering plant

Hibiscus calyphyllus (syn. Hibiscus calycinus, Hibiscus chrysantha, Hibiscus chrysanthus, Hibiscus rockii), the lemonyellow rosemallow, is a shrub from tropical Africa belonging to the genus Hibiscus. In 1883 this Hibiscus was offered for sale in England under the name Hibiscus chrysanthus with Port Natal, Cape Colony (now South Africa), identified as the source. By 1891 the same Hibiscus was identified as Hibiscus chrysantha in the United States, a practice which may have continued into the 1930s and contributed to incorrect species identification. In 1892 the name Hibiscus calycinus was designated as the correct name for the species; but, by 1894 the currently accepted name Hibiscus calyphyllus is found in association with Hibiscus calycinus. At the beginning of the 20th century, this Hibiscus was sold as seeds in the United States under the name Hibiscus Giant Yellow. Because of the similarity of the flowers, it is quite common to find Abelmoschus manihot confused with Hibiscus calyphyllus in the early 20th century gardening literature of the United States, particularly in the area of cold tolerance. If the species identification is correct, the 1903 report in The Flower Garden states that: "Giant Yellow is a beautiful canary yellow with crimson throat, hardy as far north as St. Louis, but safer in the cellar above that latitude", then Hibiscus calyphyllus may have some degree of cold tolerance. St. Louis, Missouri is in USDA Zone 6a but there are currently no reports of Hibiscus calyphyllus overwintering in USDA Zone 6a; it is known to overwinter successfully in USDA Zone 8a.

Hibiscus calyphyllus grows to 1–1.8 meters (3.3–5.9 ft) tall. It has flowers which grow to 8–10 cm (3.1–3.9 in) wide, with a yellow color and a brownish center. Unlike many African Hibiscus, which are fall to late-fall bloomers, Hibiscus calyphyllus is a summer bloomer which means it can be grown in many locations in North American and Europe and produce viable seeds, which are easy to collect and germinate. If the seeds are started indoors early in February or March, Hibiscus calyphyllus will bloom the first year. Hibiscus calyphyllus is a day-bloomer with the flowers opening several hours after sunrise and closing several hours before sunset. No hybrids of Hibiscus calyphyllus have been reported but Hibiscus syriacus and Hibiscus calyphyllus have identical diploid chromosome counts of 80.

The plant is used in the construction of huts by the Maasai people of Kenya.
