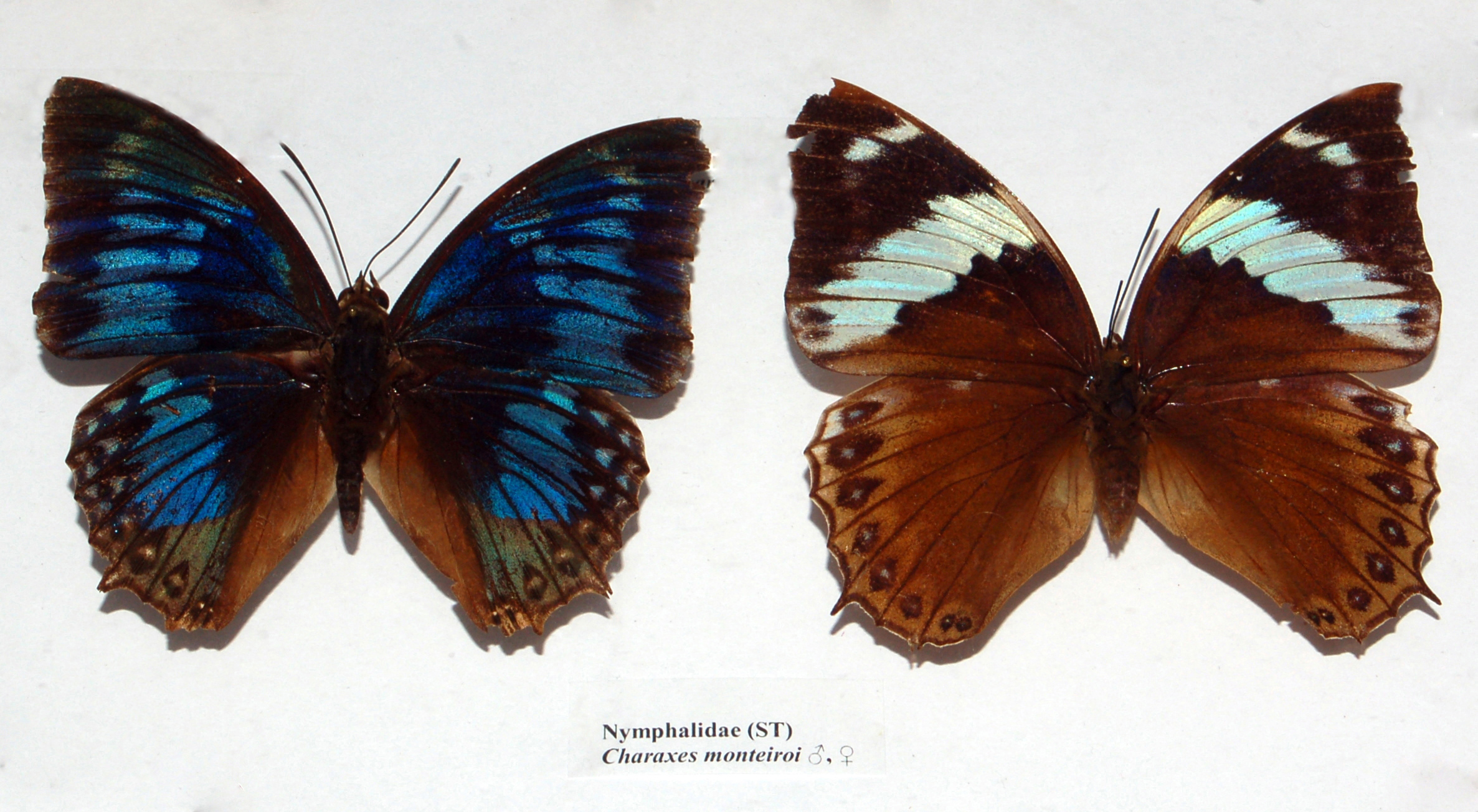
- Male and female

Scientific classification
- Kingdom: Animalia
- Phylum: Arthropoda
- Clade: Pancrustacea
- Class: Insecta
- Order: Lepidoptera
- Family: Nymphalidae
- Genus: Charaxes
- Species: C. monteiri

Binomial name
- Charaxes monteiri Staudinger, 1885

= Charaxes monteiri =

Species of butterfly

Charaxes monteiri is a rare tropical butterfly of the family Nymphalidae, belonging to the Charaxinae subfamily or leafwing butterflies. It was described by Otto Staudinger in 1885.

== Description ==
Charaxes monteiri presents an important sexual dimorphism, as do most species of the genus Charaxes. The wingspan is about 90 millimetres (3.5 in) in the males and about 100 millimetres (3.9 in) in the females. The male has a black-brown and blue wing, while the female has a brown wing with a wide white stripes on each side and a smaller one on top. Description in Seitz- Ch. monteiri Stgr. The male is very similar above to that of smaragdalis, only differing in having the distal blue spots in cellules 2—7 of the forewing much larger and sagittate and the transverse band on the hindwing anteriorly narrower and posteriorly completely united with the marginal line. Forewing beneath light grey-blue at the base and before the distal margin. In the female the forewing is black-brown above, with broad white transverse band and two white subapical spots; the hindwing above umber-brown, towards the distal margin somewhat lighter and with 8 large, angled, blue-centred, black submarginal spots and a black marginal line, thickened between the veins. Only occurring on the island of St. Thome.

== Distribution and habitat ==
This species is endemic to the island of São Tomé in the archipelago of São Tomé and Principe (Gulf of Guinea). It can be found in the mountain peaks of volcanic origin.

== Biology ==
Adults mainly feed on rotting fruits.

== Taxonomy ==
It is considered part of the Charaxes tiridates group.
