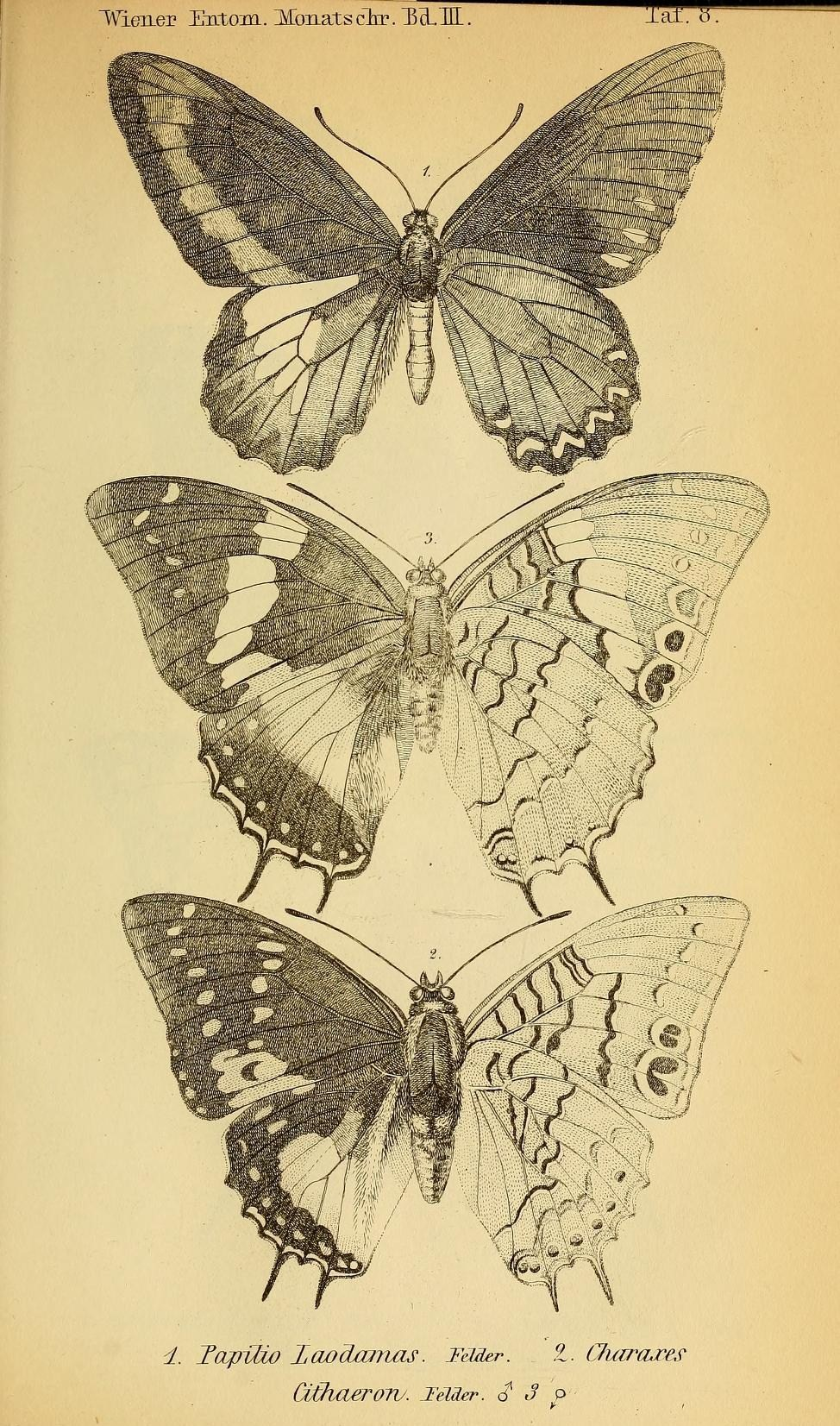
- Figure 2 male, 3 female

Scientific classification
- Kingdom: Animalia
- Phylum: Arthropoda
- Clade: Pancrustacea
- Class: Insecta
- Order: Lepidoptera
- Family: Nymphalidae
- Genus: Charaxes
- Species: C. cithaeron

Binomial name
- Charaxes cithaeron C. & R. Felder, 1859

Synonyms
- Charaxes cithaeron cithaeron ab. whitei van Someren, 1975

= Charaxes cithaeron =

Blue-spotted emperor

Species of butterfly

Charaxes cithaeron, the blue-spotted emperor or blue-spotted charaxes, is a butterfly of the family Nymphalidae. It is found in south-east Africa.

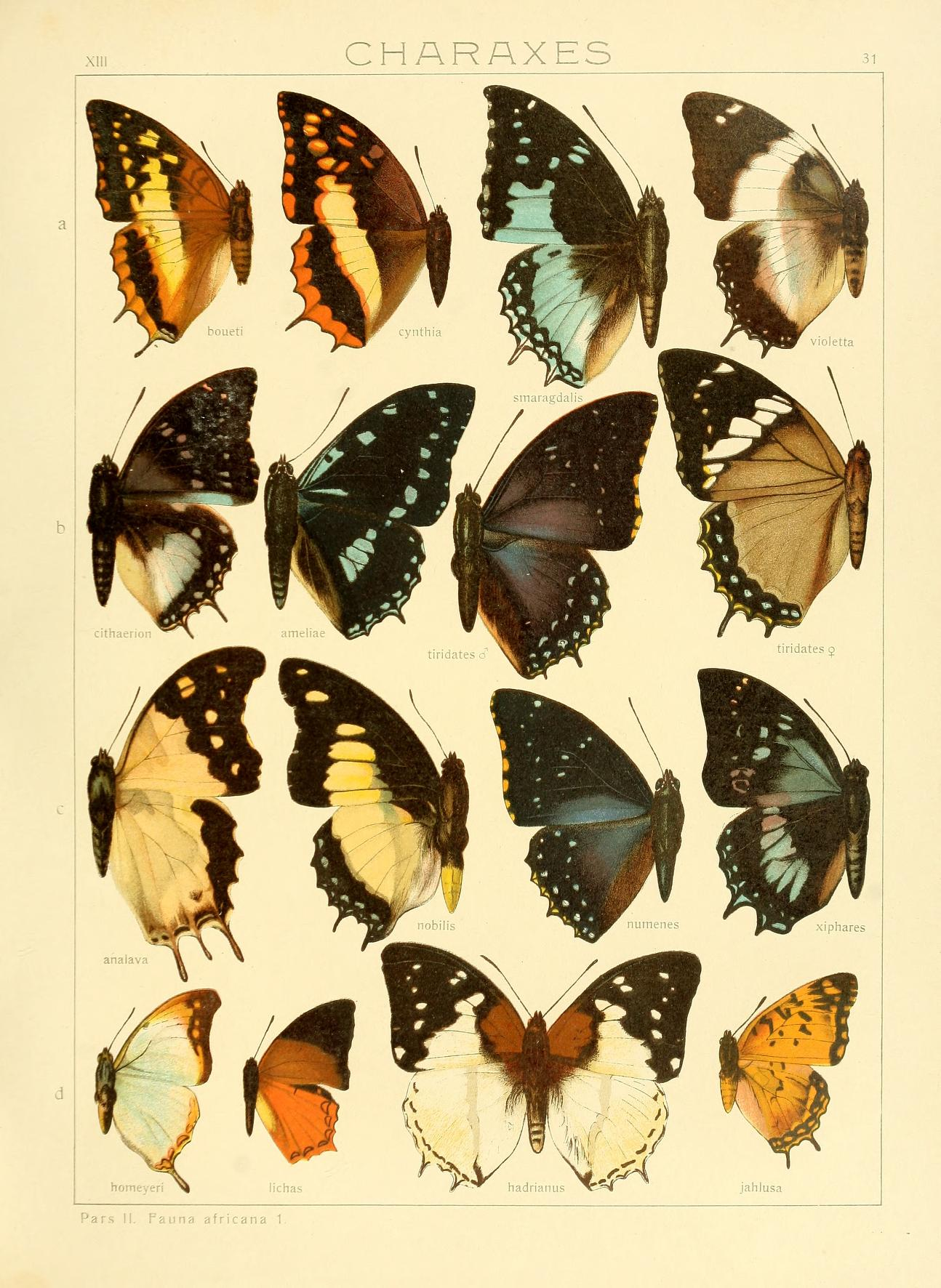
Charaxes cithaeron figured in Adalbert Seitz's Fauna Africana

== Full description ==
The wingspan is 70–80 mm in males and 85–95 mm in females. Ch. cithaeron Fldr. male: forewing above black with two transverse rows of blue spots; the proximal row in the middle, composed of 6 spots (2 in cellule lb and one each in 2-5), the distal consists of 8 spots, of which the first, in 6 and 7, are white; an elongate blue spot in la beyond the middle. Hindwing above beyond the middle with a broad transverse band, posteriorly whitish and anteriorly blue, blue submarginal spots and whitish marginal streaks. The basal part of the under surface with irregularly arranged, black, white-edged transverse streaks. The female has on the upperside a broad, curved white transverse band, proximally sharply defined, on the forewing and a bluish white transverse band on the hindwing and is hence very similar above to the female of violetta East Africa from Natal to Kenia in British East Africa.

A full description is also given by Walter Rothschild and Karl Jordan (1900). Novitates Zoologicae Volume 7:287-524. page 379-382 (for terms see Novitates Zoologicae Volume 5:545-601 )

== Biology ==
Flight period is year-round. Larvae feed on Trema orientalis, Albizia adianthifolia, Celtis africana, Cola natalensis, Chaerachme aristata, Bafia racemosa, Afzelia quanzensis, Milletia sutherlandi, Maytenus senegalensis, and Craibia brevecaudatus. Notes on the biology of cithaeron are given by Pringle et al (1994), and Kielland, J. (1990).

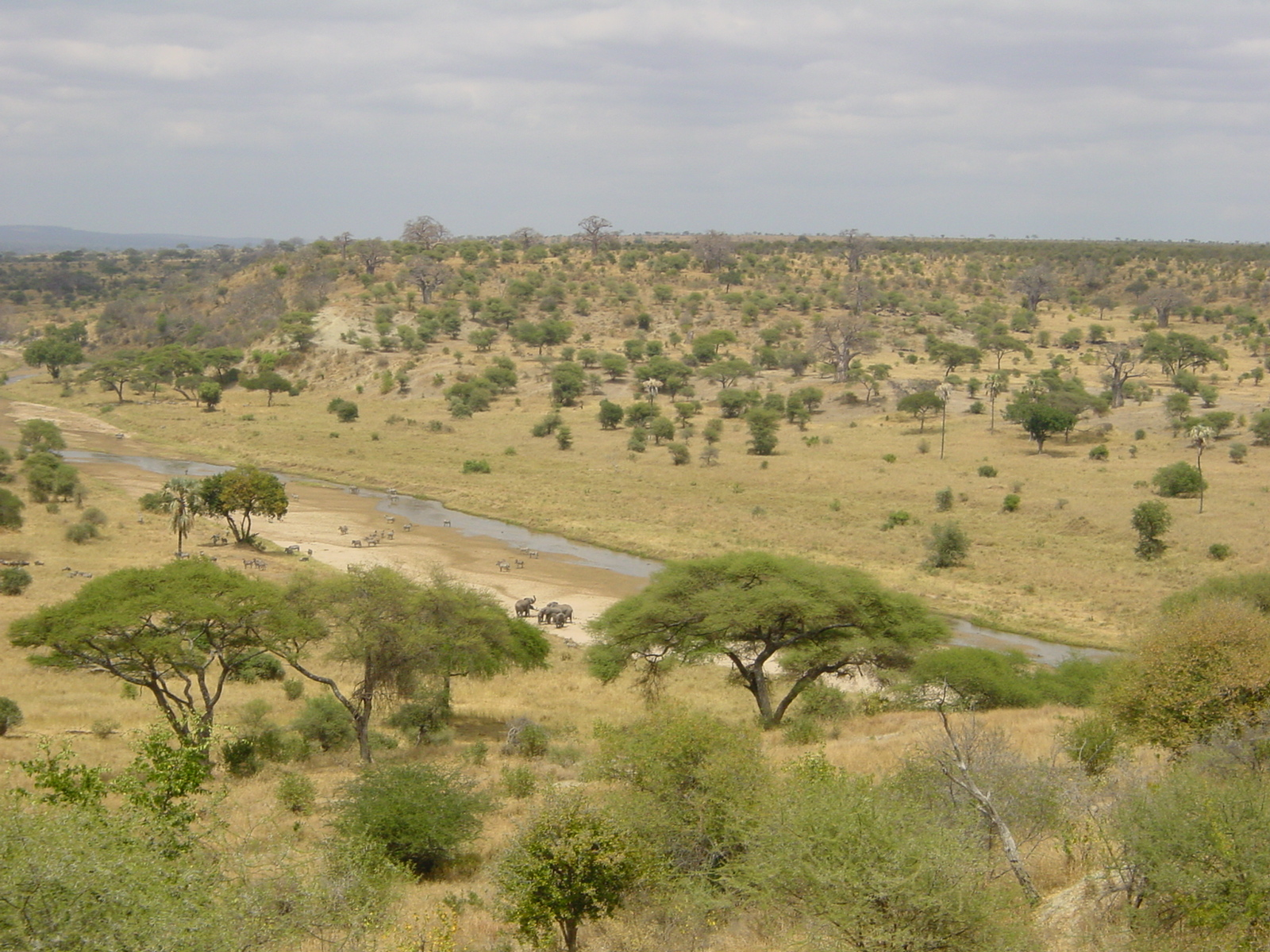
Habitat in Tanzania

== Habitat ==
Forested areas from the coastal belt to the Kenya Highlands.

== Subspecies ==
Listed alphabetically.

- C. c. cithaeron C. & R. Felder, 1859 (Tanzania, Mozambique, eastern Zimbabwe, South Africa, Eswatini)
- C. c. joanae van Someren, 1964 (Zambia, northern Zimbabwe and possibly the Tukuyu District of Tanzania)
- C. c. kennethi Poulton, 1926 (coast of Kenya, eastern Tanzania)
- C. c. nairobicus van Son, 1953 (Kenya: central highlands east of the Rift Valley)
- C. c. nyasae van Someren, 1964 (Malawi)

== Taxonomy ==
Similar to Charaxes xiphares but the female has a much wider forewing white band. Also similar to Charaxes violetta, which has straight white lines on the underside (these are irregular in Charaxes cithaeron) Kielland discusses the great variability both within and between the various described subspecies and implies that the species is not divisible into definable subspecies.

== Realm ==
Afrotropical
