= Charaxes barnsi =

Scientific classification
- Kingdom: Animalia
- Phylum: Arthropoda
- Class: Insecta
- Order: Lepidoptera
- Family: Nymphalidae
- Genus: Charaxes
- Species: C. barnsi

Binomial name
- Charaxes barnsi Joicey & Talbot, 1927

Species of butterfly

Charaxes barnsi is a butterfly in the family Nymphalidae. It is found on the island of Príncipe. The species was named by James John Joicey and George Talbot in 1927.

Charaxes barnsi is a large butterfly with a brown ground colour and a very wide metallic blue band punctuated by light blue (tinged violet).The male is a little smaller than the female which reaches 105 mm. It is considered part of the Charaxes tiridates group.
