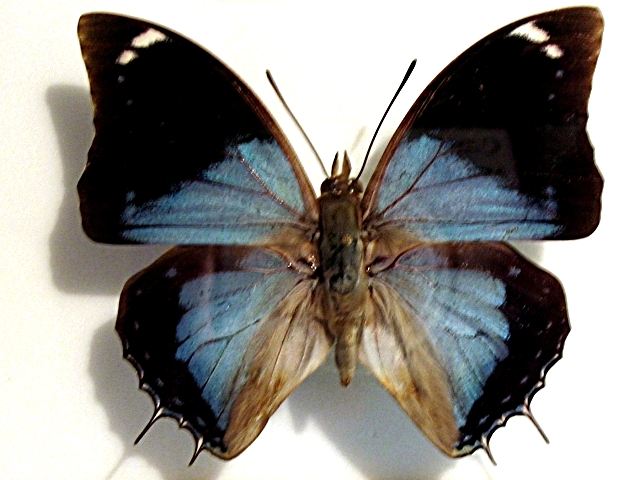

Conservation status
- Least Concern (IUCN 3.1)

Scientific classification
- Kingdom: Animalia
- Phylum: Arthropoda
- Class: Insecta
- Order: Lepidoptera
- Family: Nymphalidae
- Genus: Charaxes
- Species: C. bohemani

Binomial name
- Charaxes bohemani C. & R. Felder, 1859

= Charaxes bohemani =

Large blue emperor

Species of butterfly

Charaxes bohemani, the large blue emperor, large blue charaxes or divebomber charaxes, is a butterfly of the family Nymphalidae. It is found in eastern and southern Africa (Angola, Zaire, Zambia, Zimbabwe, Malawi, Mozambique, Namibia, Botswana, Tanzania, Kenya, South Africa).

== Description ==
The wingspan is 65–75 mm in males and 78–95 mm in females. Both wings above in the basal part glossy blue; on the forewing the blue colour reaches to the base of vein 3 and is distally out off straight but obliquely, on the hindwing it extends far beyond the middle; before the apex of the forewing two white subapical spots; the apical area is otherwise unicolorous black in the male but has in the female a broad white transverse band, placed close beyond the blue colour and extending from the costal margin to vein 1. On the hindwing the costal and distal margins are broadly black, the latter with a fine blue marginal line, partly whitish in the female, and blue submarginal dots; the inner margin grey to vein 2. The under surface is grey to brown-grey with black, white-edged transverse streaks, which on the hindwing do not form a continuous line. German South-West Africa to the Congo and eastwards to Massailand. A full description is given by Walter Rothschild and Karl Jordan, 1900 Novitates Zoologicae Volume 7:287-524. page 374-376 (for terms see Novitates Zoologicae Volume 5:545-601 )

== Biology ==
Their flight period is year-round. The larvae feed on Afzelia quanzensis, Brachystegia spiciformis, Julbernardia globiflora, Philenoptera violacea, Dalbergia nitidula, Scotia brachypetala, and Xeroderris stuhlmanni.
