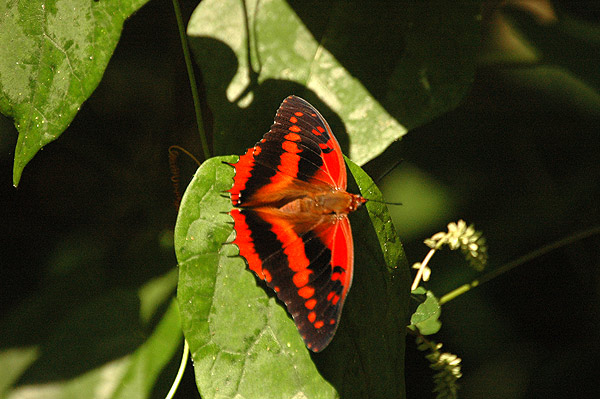

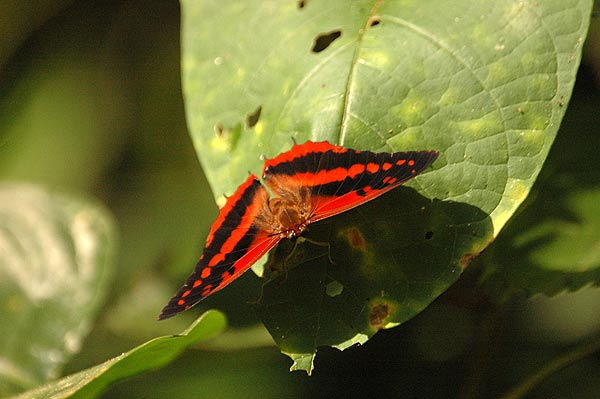
- C. c. kinduana basking in Semuliki N.P. in western Uganda

Scientific classification
- Kingdom: Animalia
- Phylum: Arthropoda
- Clade: Pancrustacea
- Class: Insecta
- Order: Lepidoptera
- Family: Nymphalidae
- Genus: Charaxes
- Species: C. cynthia

Binomial name
- Charaxes cynthia Butler, 1866 >

Synonyms
- Charaxes lysianassa Westwood, 1874; Charaxes cynthia guineensis Le Moult, 1933; Charaxes cynthia ab. mawamba Grünberg, 1911; Charaxes cynthia f. albofascia Le Cerf, 1923; Charaxes cynthia ab. cyzeyi Lathy, 1925; Charaxes cynthia f. augusticlavius Rousseau-Decelle, 1934; Charaxes cynthia f. intermedia Dufrane, 1953; Charaxes cynthia cameroonensis van Someren, 1969; Charaxes cynthia propinqua van Someren, 1969; Charaxes cynthia sabulosus f. aurantiaca Rousseau-Decelle, 1934

= Charaxes cynthia =

Western red charaxes

Species of butterfly

Charaxes cynthia, the western red charaxes, is a butterfly in the family Nymphalidae. It is found in Senegal, Guinea, Sierra Leone, Liberia, Ivory Coast, Ghana, Nigeria, Cameroon, Gabon, the Republic of the Congo, the Central African Republic, the Democratic Republic of the Congo, Uganda, Angola, Sudan, Uganda, Kenya, Tanzania and Zambia.

== Description ==
Upperside black brown, crossed by a central ferruginous band, as in C. lucretius, divided into spots by the nervures towards the apex of the front wings, and incurved towards the anterior margin; outer margin deeper ferruginous, divided into marginal spots by the nervures in the front wings; base reddish brown; inner margin of hindwings covered with long brown hairs; front marginal edge of anterior wings reddish brown, with four spots of the same colour in couples just below it, two at the end of the cell, and two just beyond. Body golden brown; abdomen pale; head and prothorax reddish; palpi white externally.

Underside—front wings reddish grey, crossed beyond the middle by a band of large pale oval ferruginous spots, tapering towards the apex, and curving at the top towards the anterior margin, enclosing ochreous lunules, and bordered outwardly by faint silvery lunules; the last three spots bordered inwardly, the lowest one with green grey deeply margined with black, the other two with ochreous bordered outwardly with ferruginous; a large irregular black patch marked with three silvery streaks near the anal angle; a reddish elongate spot at the anal angle; front marginal edge silver from the base to the end of the cell; cell ochreous, enclosing four irregular reddish spots; two similar spots at the end of the cell, margined outwardly with ochreous, and three similar lunular spots placed obliquely just beyond; a black and ferruginous spot just below the middle of the median nervure. Hind wings ferruginous; basal half crossed by three wavy bands of grey, the central one distinct, silvery; apical half with irregular reddish grey submarginal bands, bordered outwardly by a lunulate line of violaceous; wings crossed by a central irregular silver band from the middle of the front margin to the inner margin just above the anal angle; an irregular row of eight spots between the nervures, outside the central band, the seven upper ones ochreous, lunular, the eighth silver, linear; a yellowish-green spot at the anal angle, bounded inwardly by a fine pale blue line and two black dots; inner margin streaked with grey. Body whitish ochreous. Hab. Ashanti. B.M. Seitz-Ch. cynthia Btlr. The male is above confusingly like that of Charaxes lucretius, the only particular difference being that the red-yellow marginal spots on the forewing are smaller and the red-yellow marginal band of the hindwing broader; beneath, however, it agrees almost completely with boueti and hence is very different from lucretius. The female is on both surfaces similar to that of boueti, differing above in the darker black- brown basal part of both wings, in the brighter yellow median band, which is red-yellow in cellules 3—7 of the forewing, and the larger marginal spots. Sierra Leone to Angola and Unyoro.

== Biology ==
The habitat consists of primary forest. The larvae feed on Griffonia simplicifolia, Albizia zygia, Garcinia, Griffonia, Klainedoxa, Phialodiscus, Celtis and Coffea species. Notes on the biology of cynthia are given by Larsen, T.B. (1991) .

== Taxonomy ==
Charaxes cynthia group

The group members are:

- Charaxes cynthia similar to Charaxes lucretius
- Charaxes protoclea
- Charaxes boueti close to next
- Charaxes lasti close to last
- Charaxes alticola sometimes ranked as a subspecies of Charaxes boueti

Related to Charaxes lasti, Charaxes macclounii and Charaxes boueti

== Subspecies ==
- Charaxes cynthia cynthia — Senegal, Guinea, Sierra Leone, Liberia, Ivory Coast, Ghana, western Nigeria
- Charaxes cynthia kinduana Le Cerf, 1923 — south-eastern Nigeria, Cameroon, Gabon, Congo, Central African Republic, southern Sudan, northern and central Democratic Republic of the Congo, western Uganda
- Charaxes cynthia mukuyu van Someren, 1969 — — Tanzania: Kigoma and Mpanda
- Charaxes cynthia parvicaudatus Lathy, 1925 . — eastern Uganda, western Kenya, north-western Tanzania
- Charaxes cynthia sabulosus Talbot, 1928 — Democratic Republic of the Congo, north-western Zambia

Torben Larsen developed a species numbering system for his 2005 publication Butterflies of West Africa. The nominate subspecies is #731. The 'Larsen' numbers have since been used with permission in A Sharp Eye on Butterflies of Ghana.

=== Subspecies gallery ===
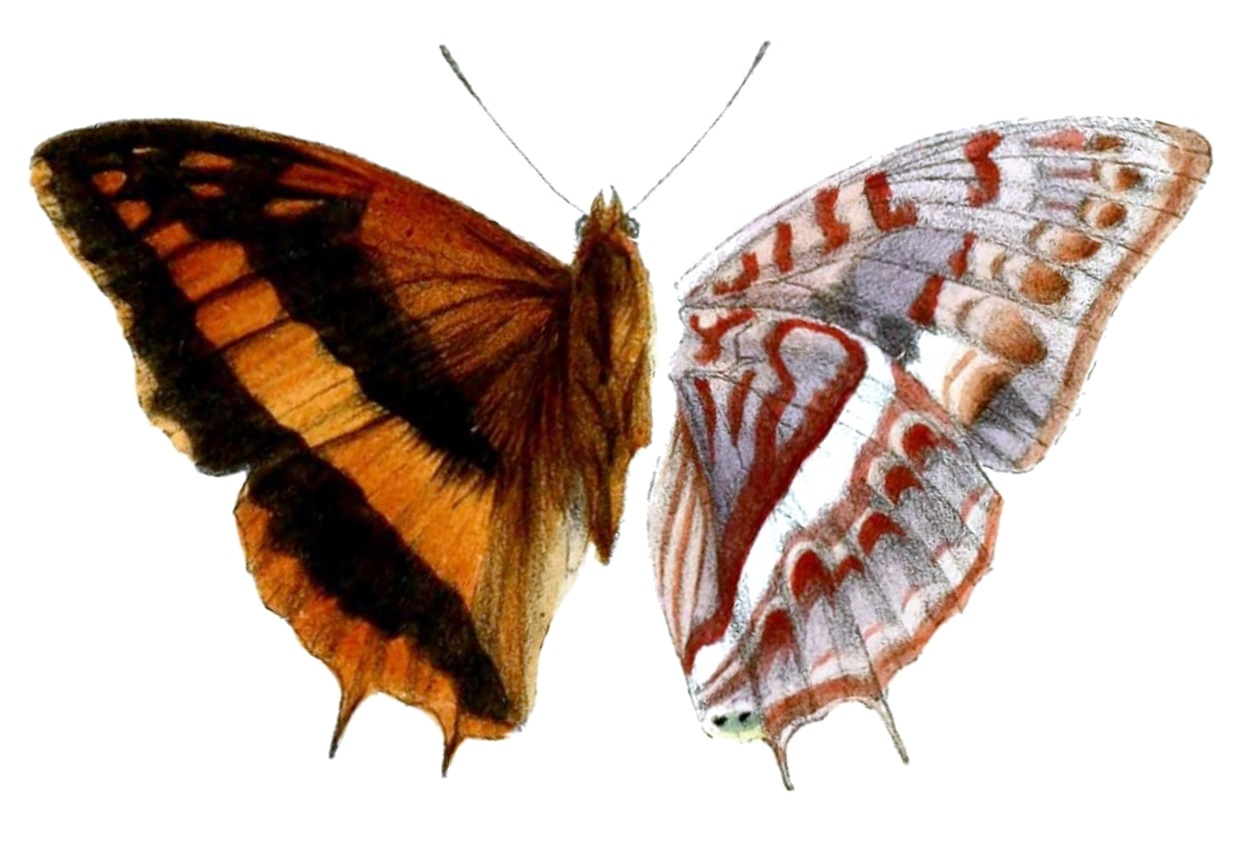
C. c. cynthia in A.G. Butler (1866)

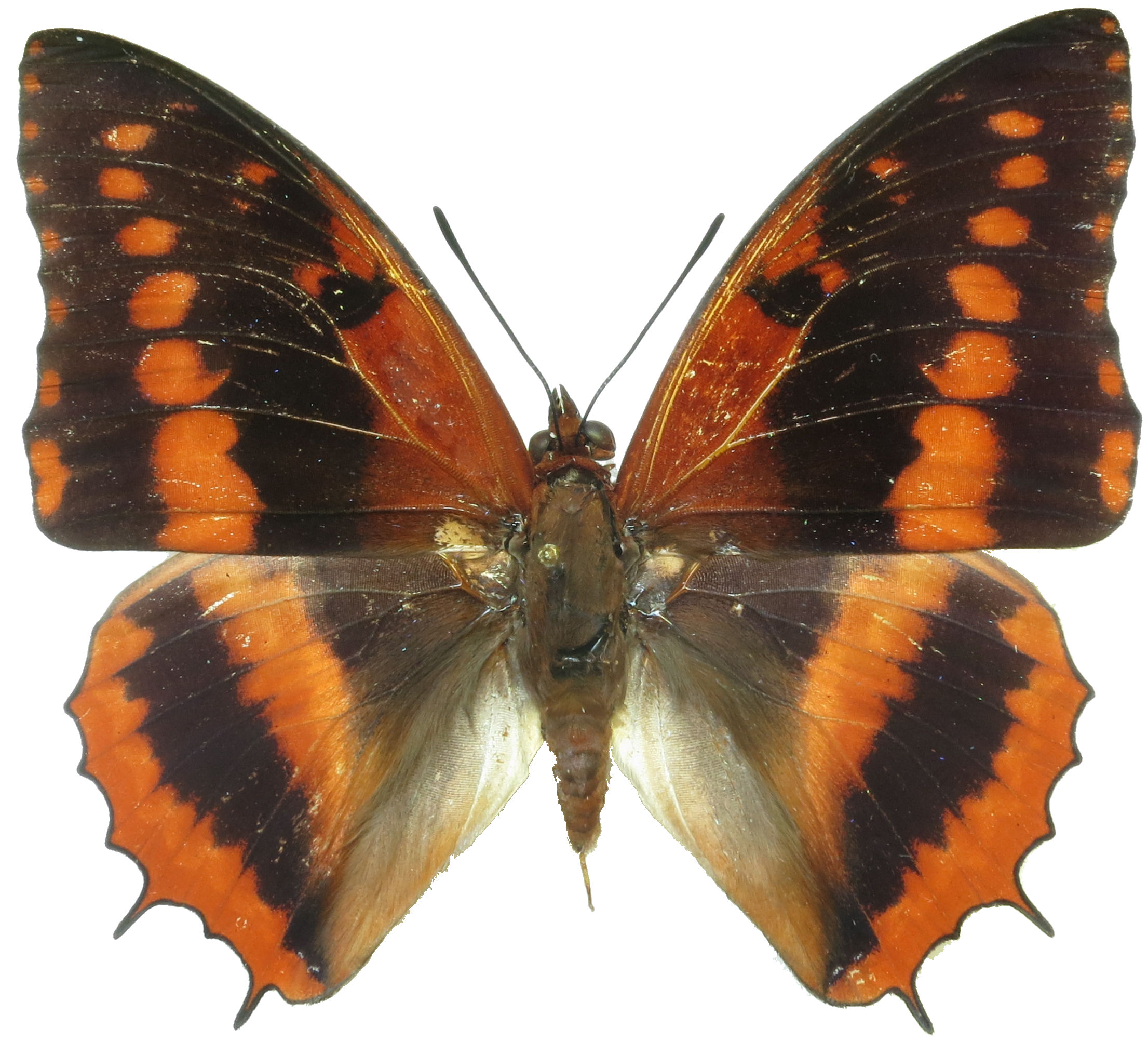
C. c. kinduana from CAR
