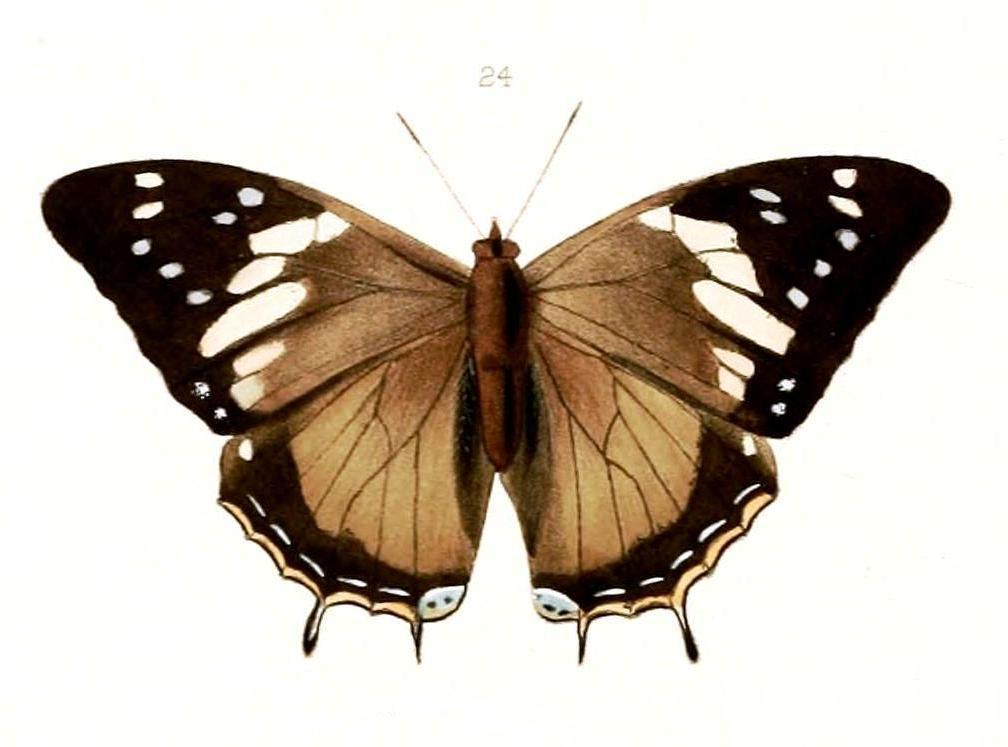
- Female
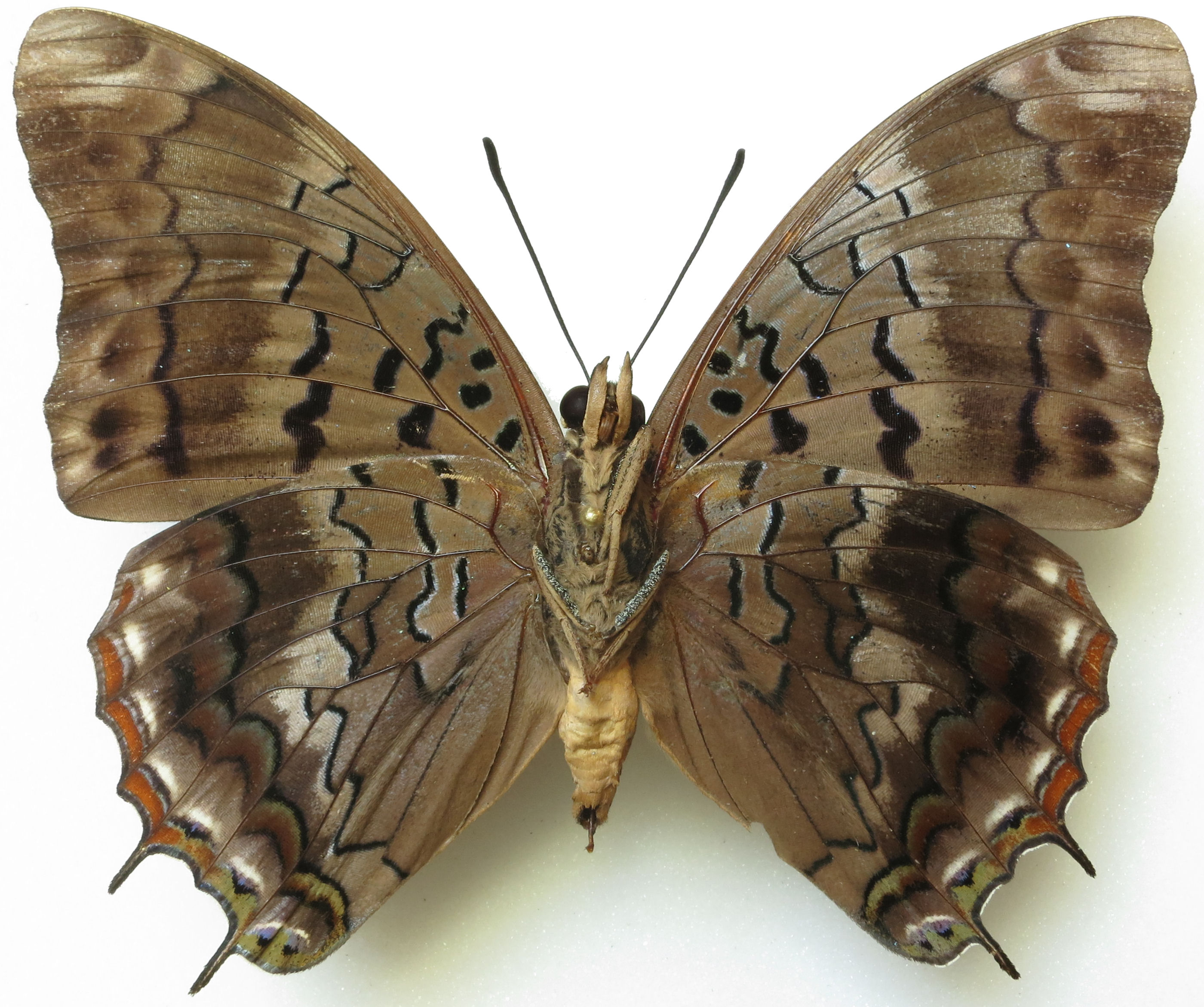
- Male from the CAR - ventral view

Scientific classification
- Kingdom: Animalia
- Phylum: Arthropoda
- Clade: Pancrustacea
- Class: Insecta
- Order: Lepidoptera
- Family: Nymphalidae
- Genus: Charaxes
- Species: C. cedreatis

Binomial name
- Charaxes cedreatis Hewitson, 1874

Synonyms
- Charaxes etheocles etheocles f. lutacea Rothschild, 1900; Charaxes etheocles etheocles f. vetula Rothschild, 1900; Charaxes etheocles etheocles f. protocedreatis Poulton, 1926; Charaxes cedreatis cedreatis f. inexpectata van Someren, 1969

= Charaxes cedreatis =

Species of butterfly

Charaxes cedreatis, the green demon charaxes, is a butterfly in the family Nymphalidae. It is found in Guinea, Sierra Leone, Liberia, Ivory Coast, Ghana, Nigeria, Cameroon, Bioko, Gabon, the Republic of the Congo, the Central African Republic, southern Sudan, northern Angola, the Democratic Republic of the Congo, Uganda, south-western Kenya, western Tanzania and north-western Zambia.

== Description ==
The male differs from that of Charaxes etheocles in the greenish sheen in the basal third of the upperside of the forewing. It is possible that there are a number of female forms not been properly associated with cedreatis

Aurivillius in Seitz-Female f. cedreatis Hew. Forewing above at the base to the white transverse band and hindwing to 5 mm. from the distal margin olive-grey; the white transverse band of the forewing in cellules 2—6 5mm. in breadth and sharply defined, in la indistinct; apical part black with 2 whitish postdiscal spots in 6 and 7. Hindwing with whitish submarginal and greenish marginal streaks. Above coloured and marked as in the females of tiridates and numenes. Gold Coast to Angola.

Torben Larsen developed a species numbering system for his 2005 publication Butterflies of West Africa. This species is #768. The 'Larsen' numbers have since been used with permission in A Sharp Eye on Butterflies of Ghana.

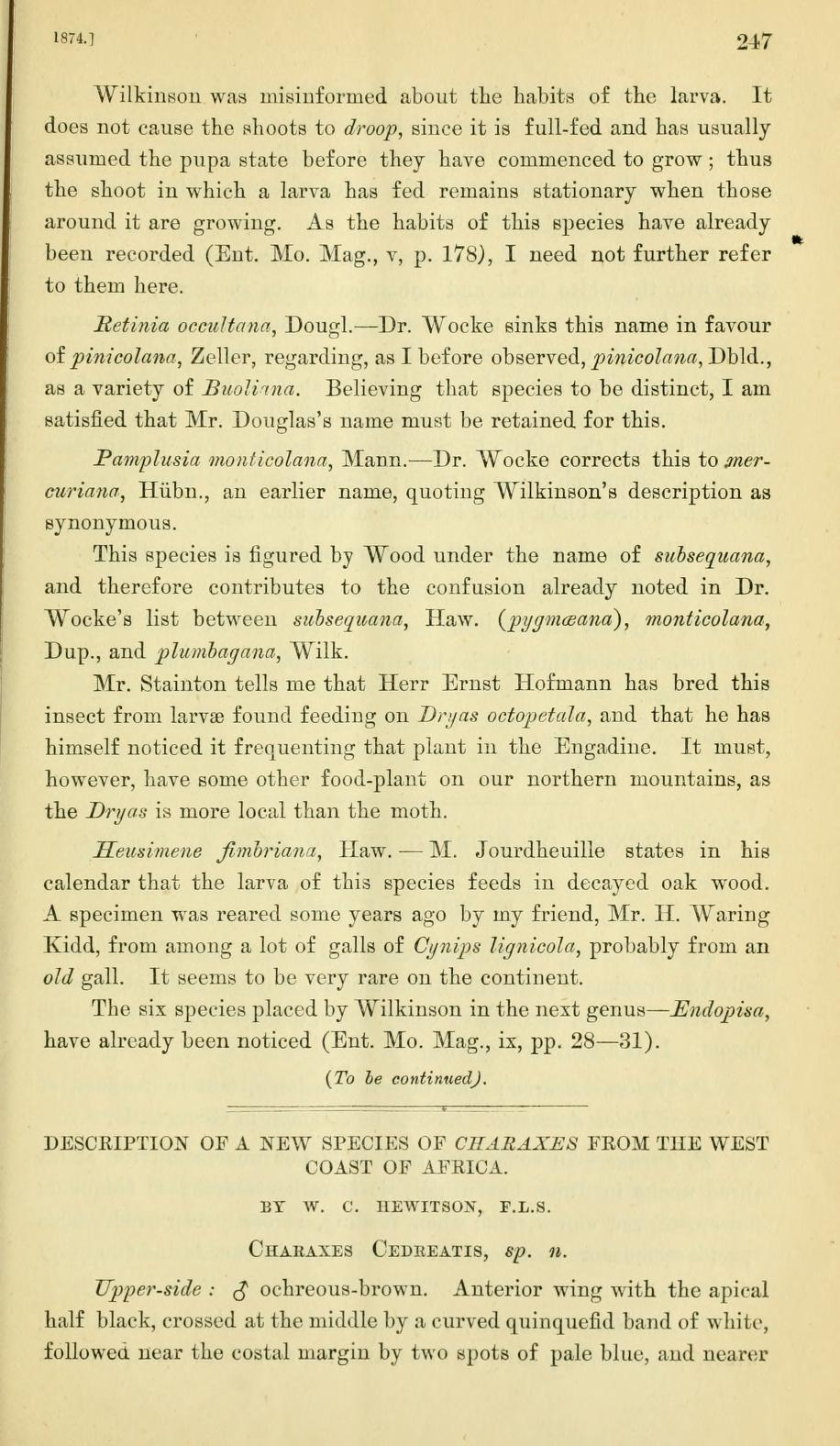
Original description

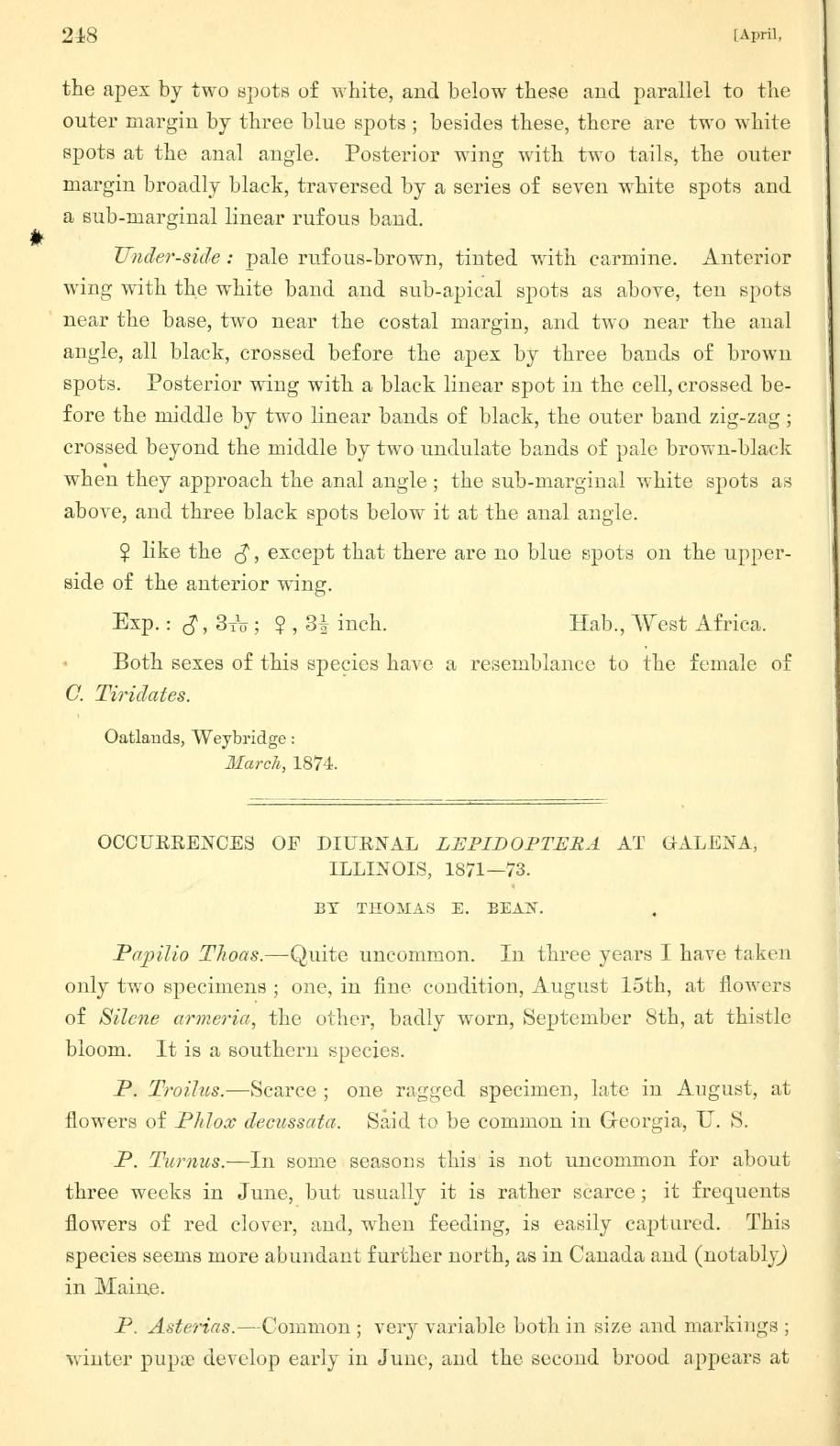

== Biology ==
The habitat consists of evergreen forests, Brachystegia (Miombo) woodland and riverine forests. Notes on the biology of cedreatis are given by Pringle et al. (1994), Larsen, T.B. (1991), Larsen, T.B. (2005) and Kielland, J. (1990).

The larvae feed on Albizia brownei, Albizia grandibracteata, Albizia zygia, Griffonia simplicifolia, Annona senegalensis, Dalbergia lactea and Scutia myrtina.

The typical khaki-coloured female apparently mimics females of the much larger species tiridates, numenes and bipunctatus, a phenomenon known as ‘Swynnertonian mimicry’.

== Taxonomy ==
Charaxes cedreatis is a member of the large species group Charaxes etheocles
