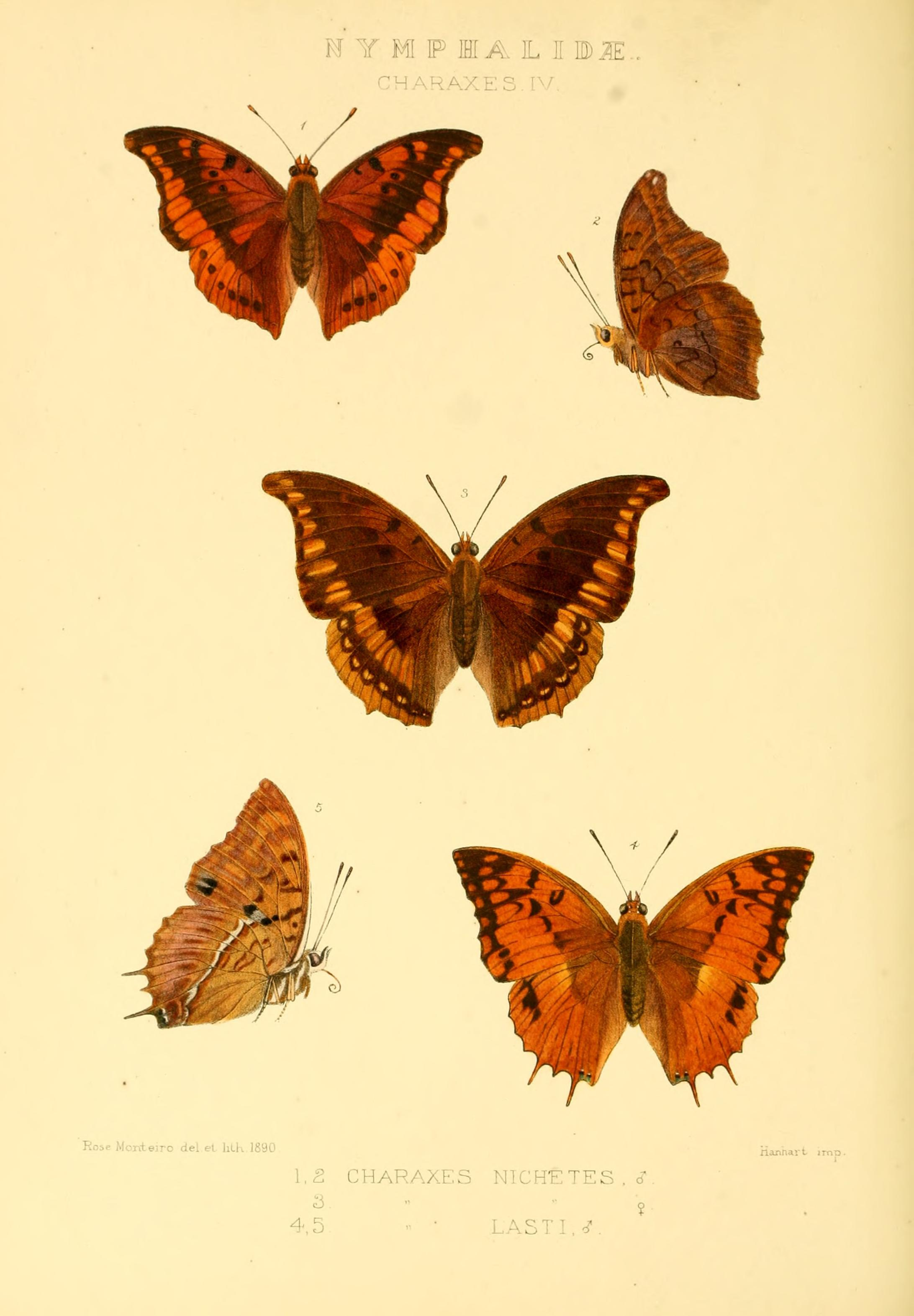
- Charaxes lasti in Rhopalocera exotica

Scientific classification
- Domain: Eukaryota
- Kingdom: Animalia
- Phylum: Arthropoda
- Class: Insecta
- Order: Lepidoptera
- Family: Nymphalidae
- Genus: Charaxes
- Species: C. lasti

Binomial name
- Charaxes lasti Grose-Smith, 1889

Synonyms
- Charaxes boueti centralis Neustetter, 1929

= Charaxes lasti =

Silver-striped charaxes

Species of butterfly

Charaxes lasti, the silver-striped charaxes, is a butterfly in the family Nymphalidae. It is found in Kenya and Tanzania.

== Description ==
lasti Smith male: the black spots on the upperside of the forewing which divide the median band are free or nearly so; the hindwing above is almost unicolorous red-yellow, only before the distal margin with a row of black submarginal spots. The female has a whitish yellow median band, which on the forewing is already divided into two branches from cellule 2, the proximal one composed of very irregular spots; the distal part of the forewing is black with small red-yellow marginal spots; the basal part of both wings yellow-brown; the hindwing with a broad black submarginal band before the red-yellow distal margin. Manicaland to Mombasa in British East Africa.

== Biology ==
The habitat consists of coastal and sub-coastal forests and heavy woodland.

The larvae feed on Afzelia quanzensis, Paramacrolobium coeruleum, Julbernardia magnistipulata, and Macrolobium species.

== Taxonomy ==
Charaxes cynthia group.

The group members are:

- Charaxes cynthia similar to Charaxes lucretius
- Charaxes protoclea
- Charaxes boueti close to next
- Charaxes lasti close to last
- Charaxes alticola

Related to Charaxes cynthia, Charaxes macclounii and Charaxes boueti

== Subspecies ==
- Charaxes lasti lasti (Kenya: southern coast and the Shimba Hills, north-eastern Tanzania)
- Charaxes lasti kimbozae Kielland, 1984 (eastern Tanzania)
- Charaxes lasti magomberae Kielland, 1984 (eastern Tanzania)
