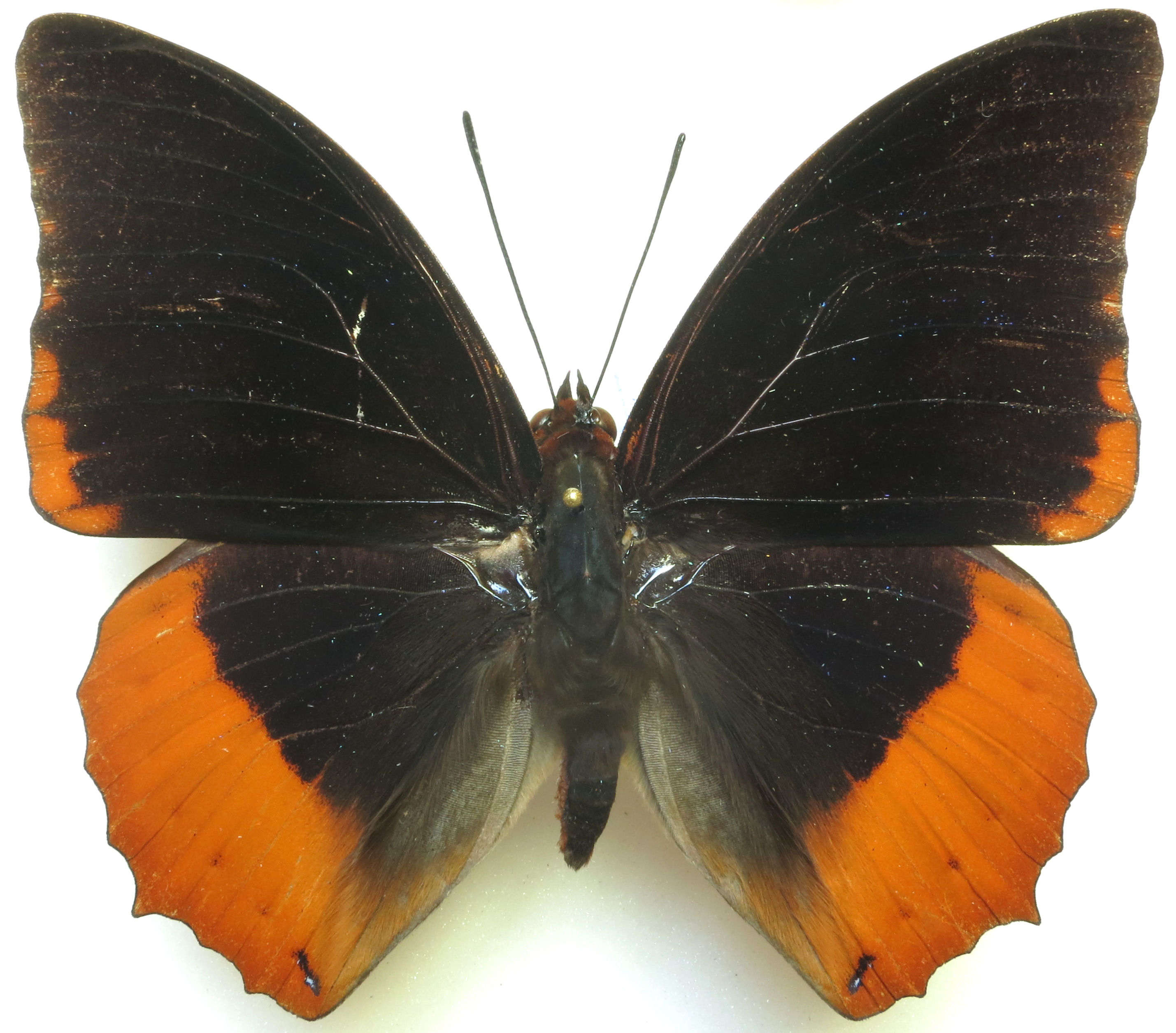
- Charaxes protoclea protoclea male

Scientific classification
- Kingdom: Animalia
- Phylum: Arthropoda
- Clade: Pancrustacea
- Class: Insecta
- Order: Lepidoptera
- Family: Nymphalidae
- Subfamily: Charaxinae
- Tribe: Charaxini
- Genus: Charaxes
- Species: C. protoclea

Binomial name
- Charaxes protoclea Feisthamel, 1850

Synonyms
- Charaxes aeson Herrich-Schaeffer, 1858; Philognoma azota Hewitson, 1877; Charaxes calliclea Grose-Smith, 1889; Charaxes nyasana Butler, 1895; Charaxes protoclea var. aequidistans Gaede, 1916; Charaxes protoclea catenaria f. parcepicta Rousseau-Decelle, 1934; Charaxes protoclea catenaria f. bifida Rousseau-Decelle, 1934; Charaxes protoclea catenaria f. kafakumbana Rousseau-Decelle, 1934; Charaxes protoclea catenaria f. mutschatschana Rousseau-Decelle, 1934; Charaxes protoclea ab. maculata Strand, 1910; Charaxes protoclea ab. ablutus Schultze, 1914; Charaxes protoclea ab. nigropunctata Neustetter, 1916; Charaxes protoclea var. marginepunctata Holland, 1920; Charaxes protoclea f. sinuosa Rousseau-Decelle, 1934; Charaxes protoclea protoclea f. jeromei Birket-Smith, 1960

= Charaxes protoclea =

Flame-bordered emperor

Species of butterfly

Charaxes protoclea, the flame-bordered emperor or flame-bordered charaxes, is a butterfly of the family Nymphalidae. It is found in Subsaharan Africa. It is a common forest charaxes.

== Description ==
The wingspan is 65–70 mm in males and 75–95 mm in females. Ch. protoclea Feisth. has the forewing above unicolorous black, only in cellules la—2 with orange-yellow marginal spots or with orange-yellow marginal band; hindwing above also deep black but with very broad orange-yellow marginal band, 10 mm. in breadth at vein 3, usually enclosing a black dot in cellules lc and 6; the under surface of both wings dark umber-brown with the markings ferruginous, only in cellule lc of the forewing black; the costal margin of the forewing not lighter than the ground-colour. The female is quite unlike the male and has on both surfaces a very broad white median band, which in cellules 3—7 of the forewing is more or less completely broken up into spots; the ground-colour is above blackish, beneath lighter grey-brown than in the male the forewing above as in the male only with orange-yellow marginal spots in cellules la—-2; the yellow marginal band on the upperside of the hindwing only 3 mm. in breadth. Senegambia to Angola. — nothodes Jord, connects the type-form with azota, the marginal spots of the forewing being better developed than in the former, but less than in azota, and the submarginal spots not so complete as in azota. Tanganyika. — azota Hew. must be regarded as the eastern race. The male only differs in having the orange-yellow marginal band on the upperside of the fore wing extending to the apex and preceded by a transverse row of orange-yellow submarginal spots, which are or less confluent with the marginal ones. The female has a still broader white median band on the upper surface, on the forewing broken up into two rows of spots in cellules 2—7, of which the distal row is formed of large orange-yellow spots; the orange-yellow marginal band on the forewing above is complete, as in the male . Distributed in East Africa from Delagoa Bay to Nyassaland and British East Africa, male-ab. nyasana Btlr. only differs in having the marginal and submarginal spots on the upperside of the forewing connected as far as vein 5, enclosing a black spot; in the normal form these spots are already separated in cellule 4. Nyassaland.

== Biology ==
Has two broods from October to November and from February to June.

The habitat is Miombo woodland.

Larvae feed on Afzelia quanzensis, Brachystegia spiciformis, and Julbernardia globiflora.

Notes on the biology of protoclea are given by Kielland (1990), (1991) and Pringle et al (1994).

== Taxonomy ==
Charaxes cynthia group

The group members are

- Charaxes cynthia similar to Charaxes lucretius
- Charaxes protoclea
- Charaxes boueti close to next
- Charaxes lasti close to last
- Charaxes alticola

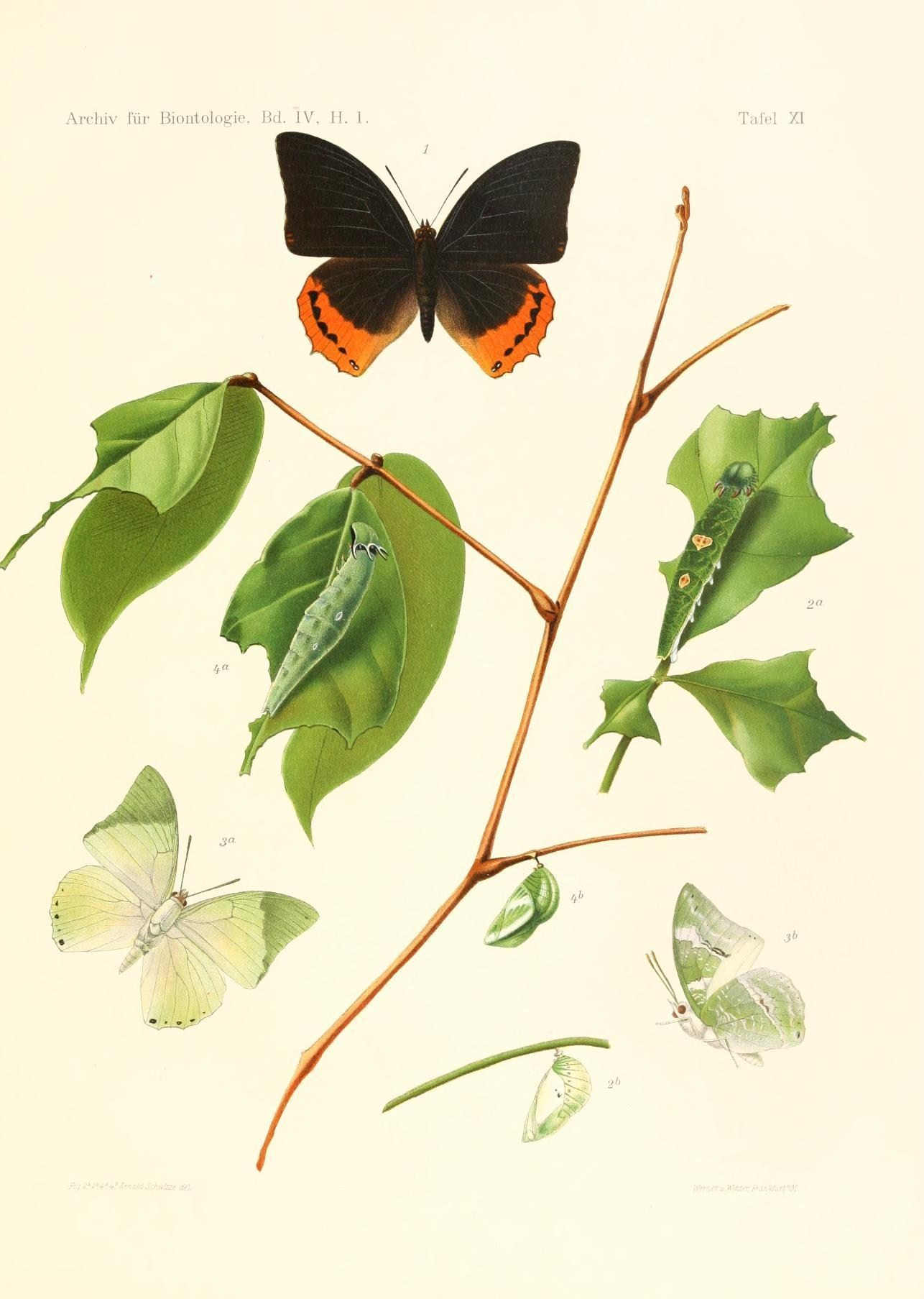
Charaxes protoclea and Charaxes subornatus

== Subspecies ==
Listed alphabetically.

- C. p. azota (Hewitson, 1877) (Kenya, Tanzania, north-eastern Zambia, Malawi, eastern Zimbabwe, southern Mozambique, South Africa: KwaZulu-Natal)
- C. p. catenaria Rousseau-Decelle, 1934(Democratic Republic of the Congo, western Tanzania, Zambia)
- C. p. cedrici Canu, 1989 (Bioko)
- C. p. nothodes Jordan, 1911 (Democratic Republic of the Congo, western Uganda, north-western Tanzania)
- C. p. protoclea Feisthamel, 1850 (Senegal, Gambia, Guinea-Bissau, Guinea, Sierra Leone, Liberia, Ivory Coast, Ghana, Togo, western Nigeria)
- C. p. protonothodes van Someren, 1971 (Nigeria, Cameroon, Central African Republic, Gabon, Congo, north-western Angola, north-western Democratic Republic of the Congo)

Torben Larsen developed a species numbering system for his 2005 publication Butterflies of West Africa. The nominate subspecies is #729. The 'Larsen' numbers have since been used with permission in A Sharp Eye on Butterflies of Ghana.

=== Subspecies gallery ===
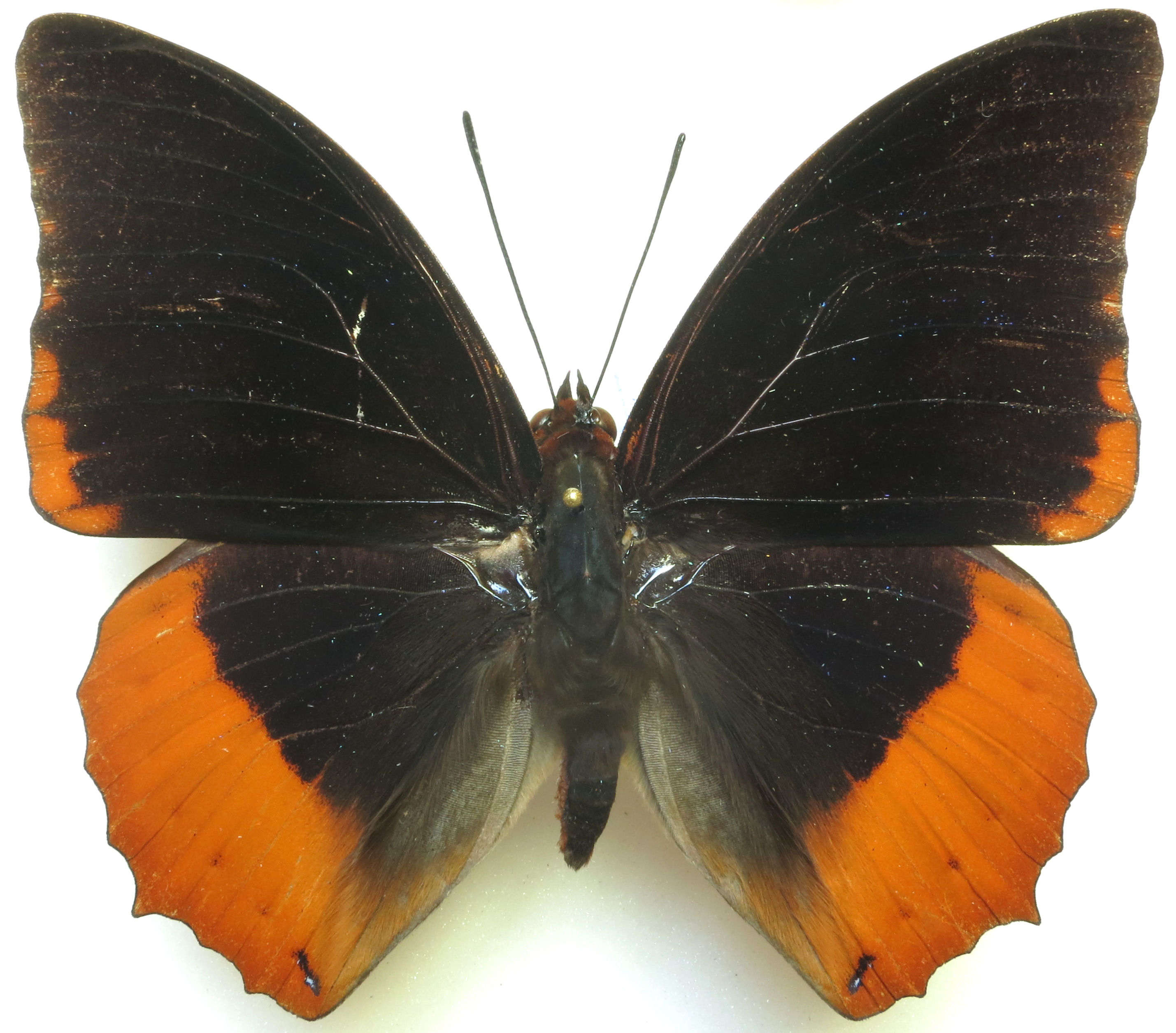
C. p. protoclea male

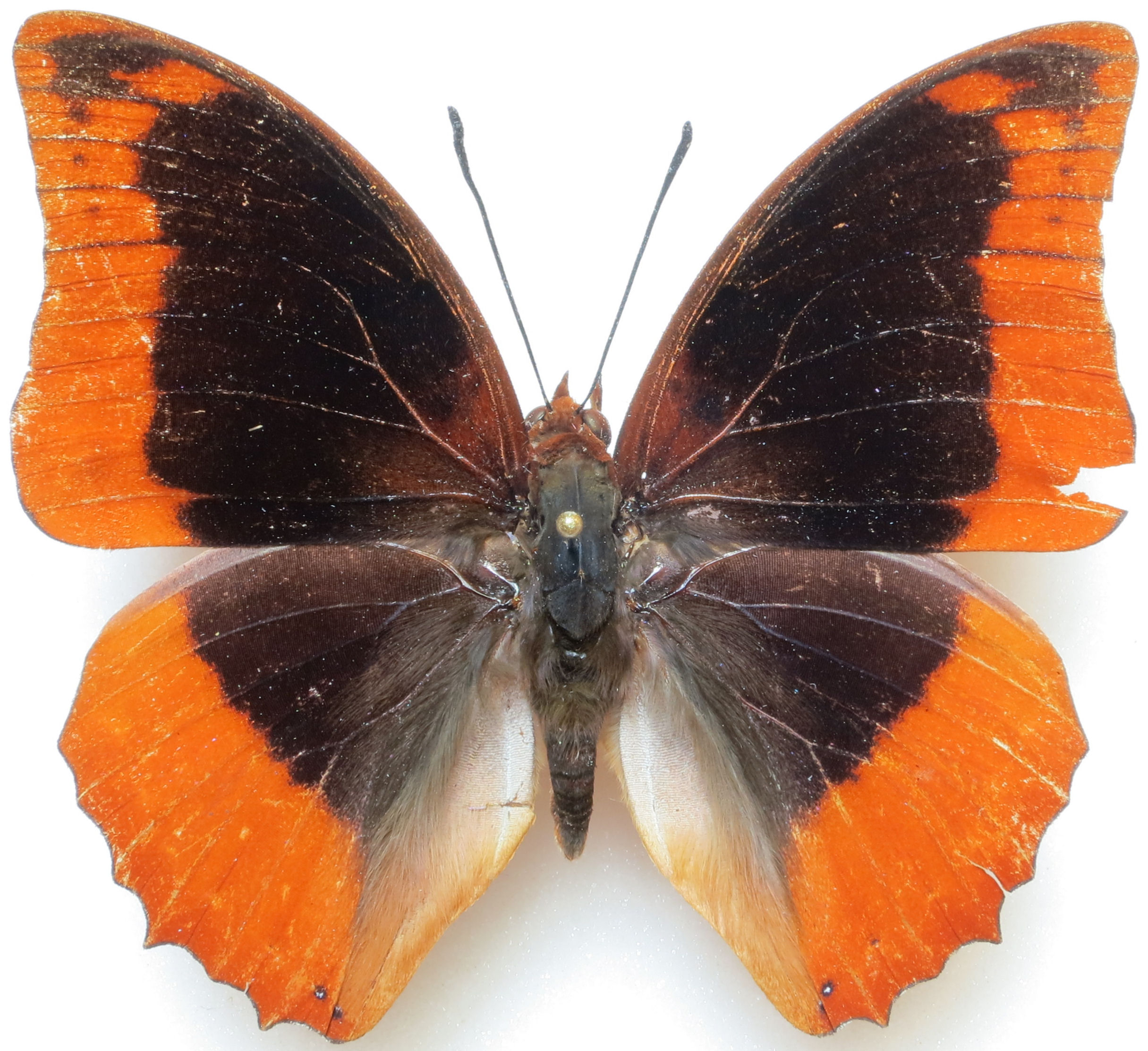
C. p. azota male from Kenya

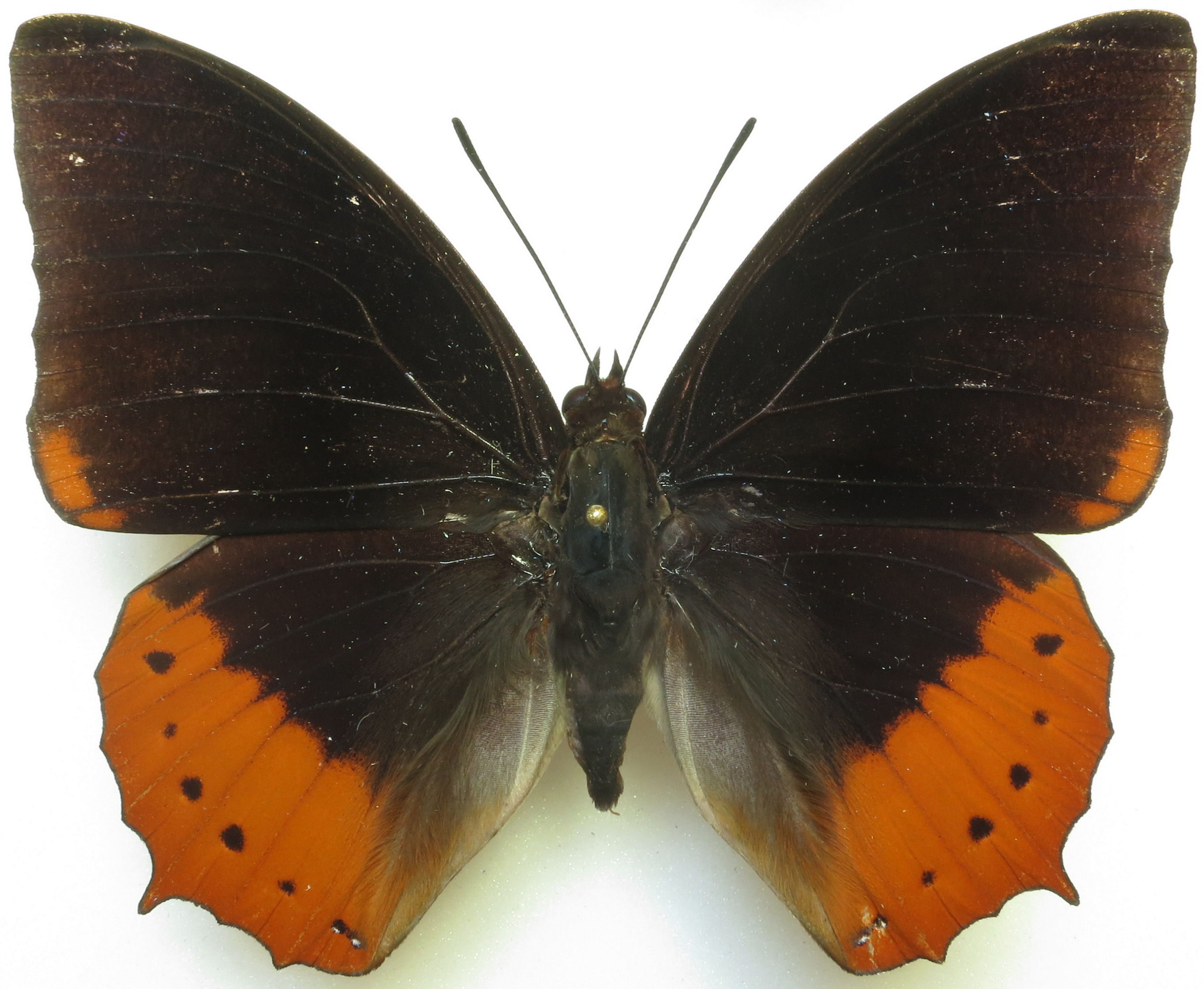
C. p. protonothodes male from CAR
