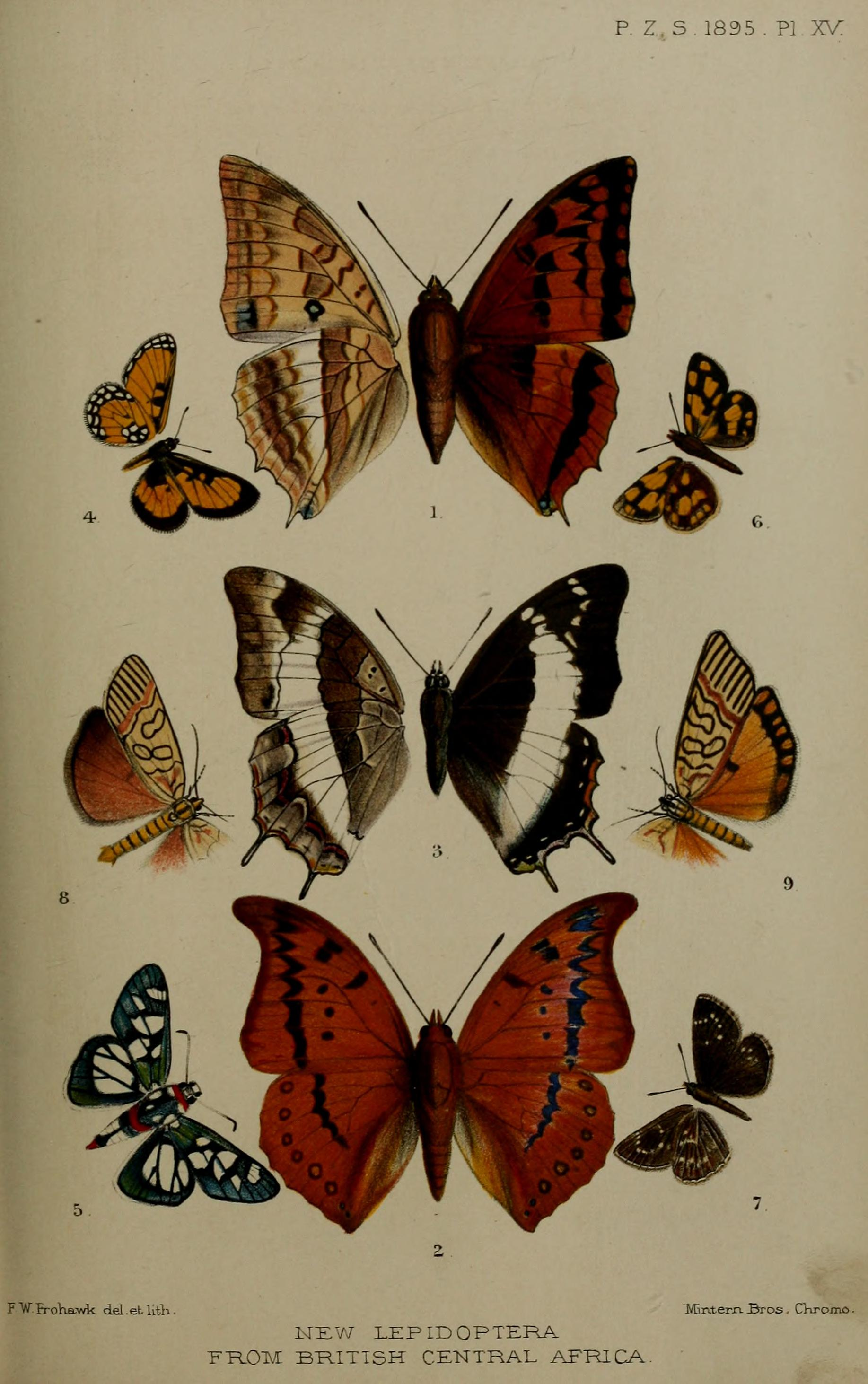
- Male, figure 1

Scientific classification
- Kingdom: Animalia
- Phylum: Arthropoda
- Class: Insecta
- Order: Lepidoptera
- Family: Nymphalidae
- Genus: Charaxes
- Species: C. macclounii

Binomial name
- Charaxes macclounii Butler, 1895

Synonyms
- Charaxes lasti var. flavescens Lanz, 1896; Charaxes boueti macclounii

= Charaxes macclounii =

Species of butterfly

Charaxes macclounii, the wild-bamboo charaxes or red coast charaxes, is a butterfly in the family Nymphalidae. It is found along the coast of Kenya, as well as in Tanzania, the Democratic Republic of the Congo, north-eastern Angola, Burundi, Zambia, Malawi, Mozambique and eastern and northern Zimbabwe.

== Description ==
male Allied to C. lasti : primaries with less arched costa, less sinuated outer margin, and shorter inner margin; secondaries strongly produced at anal angle, with only two tails, the first of which (at extremity of third median branch) is a mere denticle, the second (at extremity of first median branch) barely half the length of that in C. lasti; colouring deeper throughout, with all the black markings considerably heavier, the discal spots of primaries continued to below first median branch, those of secondaries forming a continuous tapering submarginal band; under surface altogether more ochreous than in C. lasti, the markings mostly ferruginous, the black-bordered grey markings on interno-median area of primaries reduced in size, the silver band of secondaries widened out as in C. cynthia. Expanse of wings 80 millim. female . Extremely like Mr. Trimen's figure of C. lasti female (P. Z. S. 1894, pi. V. fig. 6), but altogether deeper in colour, the black markings heavier, the macular submarginal band much wider, reducing the marginal tawny border of the primaries to a series of oval spots; the secondaries somewhat produced at anal angle, with the inferior tail slightly incurved, but both tails well developed and only slightly shorter than in C. lasti below, the wings are much paler than in the male, the silver band of secondaries being replaced by a broad creamy stramineous belt in continuation of that on the primaries. Expanse of wings 18 millim. Two pairs, Zomba. This species is intermediate in character between C. lasti and C cynthia.

Close to Charaxes lasti but underside much paler and with a less distinct silvery band border

== Biology ==
The habitat consists of dense savanna and open forests.

The larvae feed on Oxytenanthera abyssinica, Oreobambos buchwaldii, Bambusa vulgaris, Yushania alpina and Arundinaria species. Young larvae spin a cushion of silk. They are green and reach a length of 45–50 mm when fully grown.

== Taxonomy ==
Related to Charaxes lasti, Charaxes cynthia and Charaxes boueti
