= Marie-Théophile Griffon du Bellay =

French, physician, naval surgeon, explorer and ethnobotanist

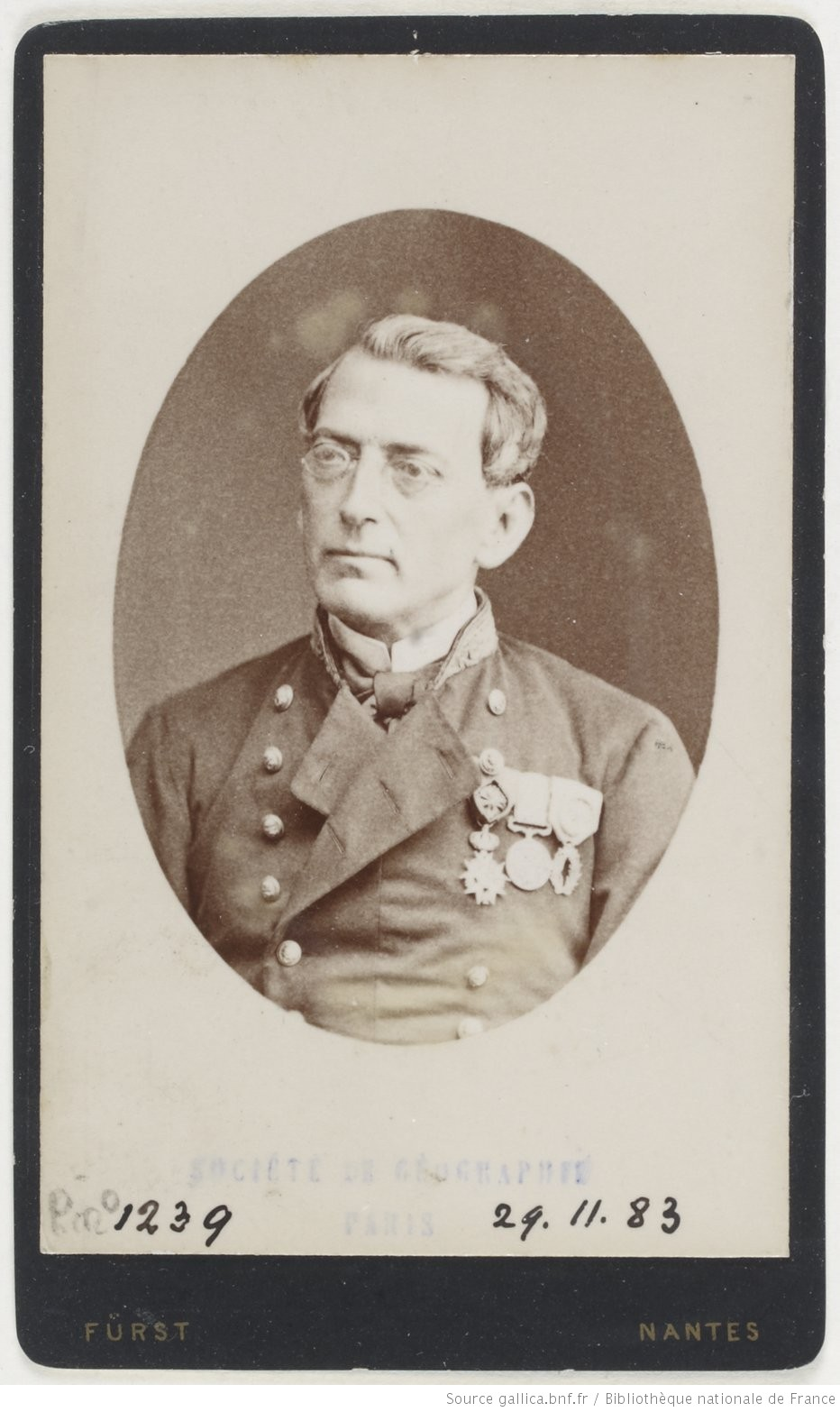
- Griffon du Bellay in full dress uniform and decorations, including Legion d'honneur and Ordre des Palmes académiques
- Born: 14 August 1829; Rochefort, Charente-Maritime, Nouvelle-Aquitaine, France
- Died: 10 November 1908 (aged 79); Saint-Nazaire, Loire-Atlantique, France
- Education: Université de Montpellier: Faculté de médecine de Montpellier
- Occupations: Physician, Naval surgeon, Explorer, Ethnobotanist
- Spouse: Laurence Joséphine Valentine Monguy
- Writing career
- Notable work: Essai sur le Tétanos 1856 Exploration du fleuve Ogo-Way 1862 Lettre sur l'Ogooué 1864 Le Gabon 1865

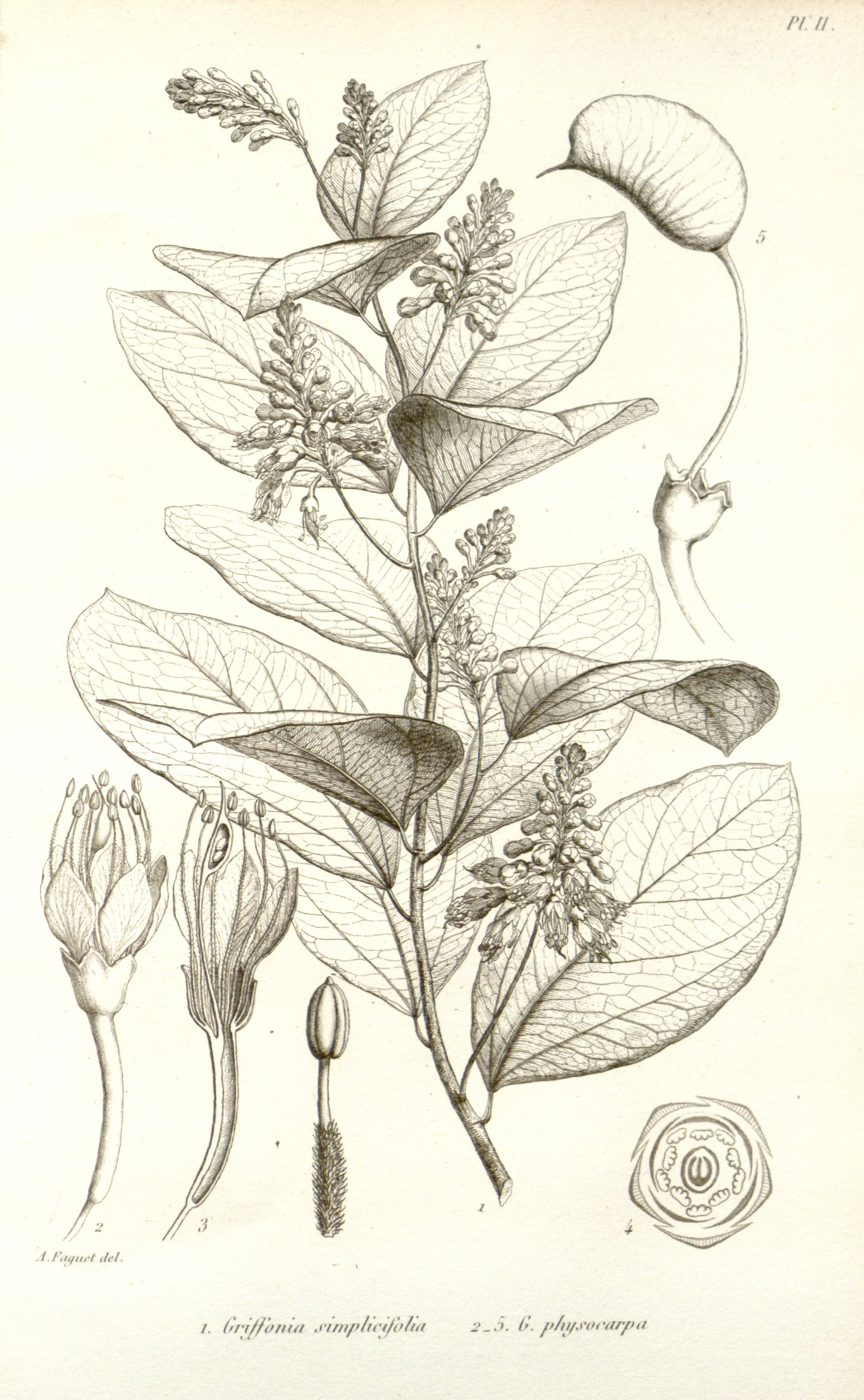
Griffonia simplicifolia: the genus Griffonia, a member of the legume family Fabaceae, is named in honour of Griffon du Bellay, who undertook an early study of the properties and uses of G. simplicifolia in Gabon.

Marie-Théophile Griffon du Bellay (14 August 1829 – 10 November 1908) was a French physician, naval surgeon, explorer and ethnobotanist.

== Life ==
Marie-Théophile was born at Rochefort, the middle child of the three sons of Joseph Jean Baptiste Alexandre Griffon du Bellay and Marie Elisabeth Claire de Nesmond. His father was one of the last remaining survivors of the infamous wreck of the Medusa (upon which he had served as secretary to the then governor of Senegal Colonel Julien-Désiré Schmaltz) and became a commissioner in the French Navy. Qualifying as a naval surgeon at the age of 20 in 1849, Marie-Théophile served on several French naval vessels between 1850 and 1861, his periods of service interspersed with time ashore in the port town of Rochefort. On the eighth of March 1856, he qualified as Doctor of Medicine, his doctoral thesis at the University of Montpellier being entitled Essai sur le Tétanos ("Essay upon Tetanus"). Surgeon first class of the ship Pionnier, under the command of Paul Augustin Serval, he twice attempted to reach the Ogooué River of Gabon in the year 1862. Stranded and unwell at the river delta, in July of that year, he was forced, in December, to give up his attempt and allow his companion to travel on alone up the valley of the river Remboué (now protected as part of Gabon's Pongara National Park).

From 25 December 1867, he was principal physician aboard the Caravane, a Hospital ship stationed in Gabon. During this time he undertook studies of Tabernanthe iboga and also of Griffonia simplicifolia (the genus Griffonia having been named in his honour by fellow physician and botanist Henri Baillon in 1865), and was among the earliest European physicians to describe sleeping sickness*. He wrote, in addition papers concerning the efficacy of quinine sulphate in his successful treatment of cases of malaria.

In 1871 he became director of the health service for the départements of la Vendée, Loire-Atlantique and Morbihan. Thereafter he worked in Guadeloupe from 1868 to 1871, (where he was confronted by an epidemic of yellow fever ) and then in Senegal from 1877 to 1878. He was for some years a member of the Société des archives historiques de la Saintonge et de l'Aunis. His name features on a monument commemorating the glorious African dead and fallen patriots of AOF in Dakar.

Note* : The French language website Bibliographies de l'Ecole Navale claims that Griffon du Bellay was the first European physician to describe sleeping sickness, but the Wikipedia page African trypanosomiasis does not support this claim, presenting evidence that British naval surgeon John Atkins described the disease on his return from West Africa in 1734, over a century earlier.

== Siblings ==
Two brothers:

- Frédéric Sylvestre Griffon du Bellay. Commissioner in the French navy. Born 11 October 1826 in Rochefort, Charente-Maritime. Died 27 May 1889 in Nantes (Loire-Atlantique). Officer of the Légion d'honneur.
- Alfred Honoré Ferdinand Griffon du Bellay. Officer of the 2nd infantry regiment of the French navy. Born 7 March 1841 in Martinique.

== Naval career ==
1849 : enrolled in the medical service of the French navy, with the rank of medical officer, third class.

September the 18th 1853 : promoted to the rank of medical officer, second class.

May the 25th 1861 : promoted to the rank of medical officer, first class.

First of November 1861 : posted to the hospital ship the Caravane moored in the Gabon estuary.

== Ogooué expeditions ==
In June of the year 1862, by order of the Minister for the Navy, Griffon du Bellay was dispatched, aboard the naval vessel Pionnier and in the company of ship's lieutenant Paul Augustin Serval, to explore the Ogooué delta. Between July and August 1862 (during which time Griffon du Bellay suffered a debilitating fever) Serval and Griffon du Bellay were able to access the Ogooué via the river Nazaré, but, due to the shallowness of the Ogooué caused by a drop in water levels, they were obliged to moor their vessel and continue their exploration by pirogue (dugout canoe).

Upon reaching the village of Arumba they were forced to abandon their plan to travel farther upstream, owing to the hostility of the villagers. Following this setback, they instead directed their intentions toward Lake Jonanga and its Sacred Isles (Îles sacrées) before pressing onward to Lakes Niogé and Lake Aningué.

In December 1862, the two explorers organised a second expedition, setting off on a whaling boat with the objective of finding a passage between the Gabon estuary and the Ogooué via the river Remboué, in the course of which they were able to reach a village in the neighbourhood of Lambaréné in what is now Moyen-Ogooué Province. Still unwell, since falling ill earlier in the year, Griffon du Bellay was forced to abandon the attempt, while Serval pushed on alone and, with some difficulty was finally able to reach the village of Orongo, inhabited by the Enenga people (a subgroup of the speakers of Myènè), whose King, Rempolé, accorded him, much to his relief, a warm welcome.

== Ethnobotany ==
In the course of his stay in Gabon, Griffon du Bellay collected 450 plant species, recording ethnobotanical information concerning their various uses. Most notable among these were the powerful stimulant and hallucinogen Tabernanthe iboga (family Apocynaceae), used in the indigenous Bwiti religion, and the legume Griffonia simplicifolia, which is rich in the serotonin precursor 5-HTP. He also encountered the use of Strophanthus hispidus (family Apocynaceae) as an arrow poison. He later displayed his plant collections in an exhibit at the Exposition universelle d'art et d'industrie de 1867, for which he won two medals.

== Works ==
- Essai sur le Tétanos, ("Essay upon Tetanus" (doctoral thesis)) 1856
- Exploration du fleuve Ogo-Way, côte occidentale d'Afrique (juillet-août 1862) ("Exploration of the River Ogo-Way (Ogooué), on the west coast of Africa (July–August 1862")), Revue maritime et coloniale, (Maritime and Colonial Review) vol. 9, 1863, p. 66-89 et 296-309
- Lettre sur l'Ogooué, ("Letter concerning the (River) Ogooué") Bulletin de la Société de Géographie (Bulletin of the Geographical Society), 1864, vol. 7, p. 462-465
- Le Gabon, Le Tour du monde, II, 1865, p. 273-320

== Decorations ==
Like his father before him, Griffon du Bellay rose to the second degree (officer) in the prestigious Légion d'honneur, France's highest order of merit for military and civil merits, established in 1802 by Napoleon Bonaparte and retained by all later French governments and régimes.

- Awarded first degree: Chevalier de la Légion d'honneur, 13 August 1863.
- Awarded second degree: Officier de la Légion d’Honneur, 28 December 1869.

He was also made an Officier d'instruction publique, the second degree (insignia: golden palms) of the Ordre des Palmes académiques, a national order bestowed by the French Republic on distinguished academics and teachers and for valuable service to universities, education and science.

== Gallery ==
Map of Gabon, showing river system of Ogooué basin, explored in part by Griffon du Bellay and Serval. Note also Lake Anengué / Aningué nr. Port Gentil.

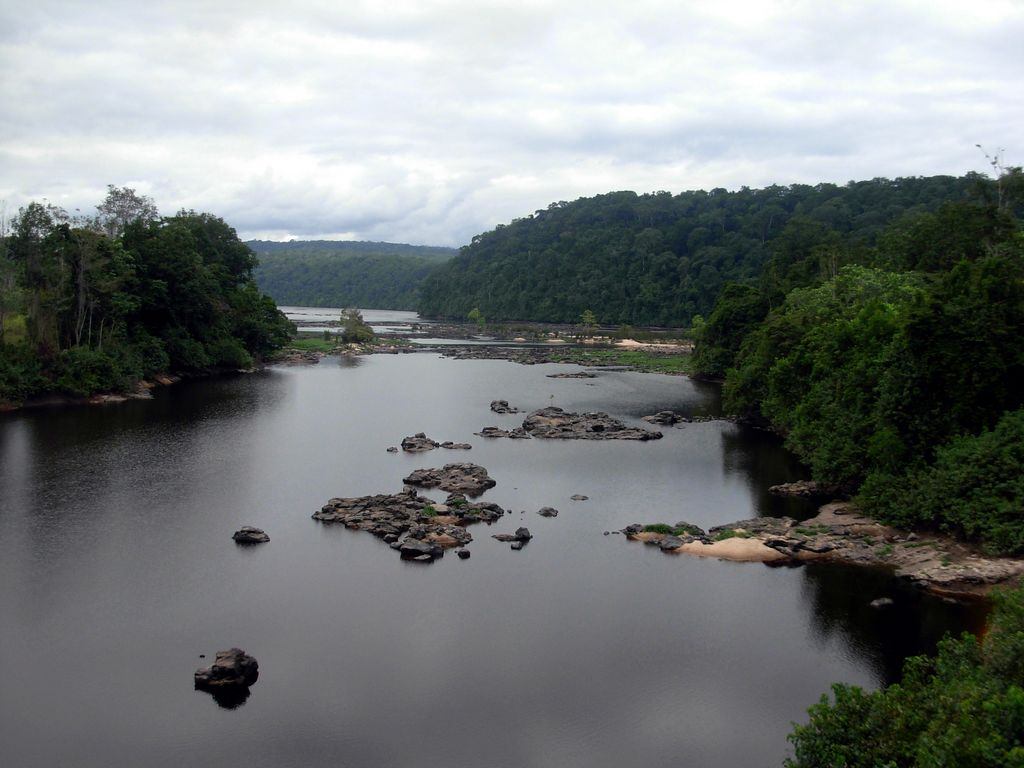
Rainforest-clad banks of the Ogooué, Gabon's principal river, the name being rendered Ogo-way in Griffon du Bellay's "Exploration..."

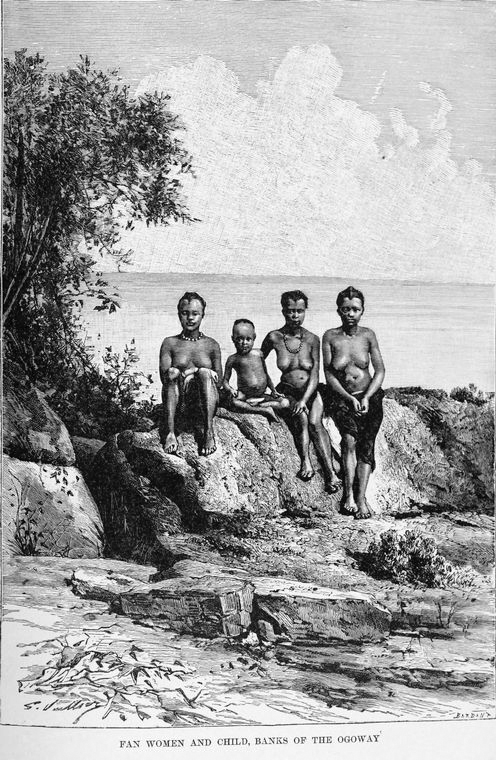
Fan(g) women and child on the banks of the Ogooué.

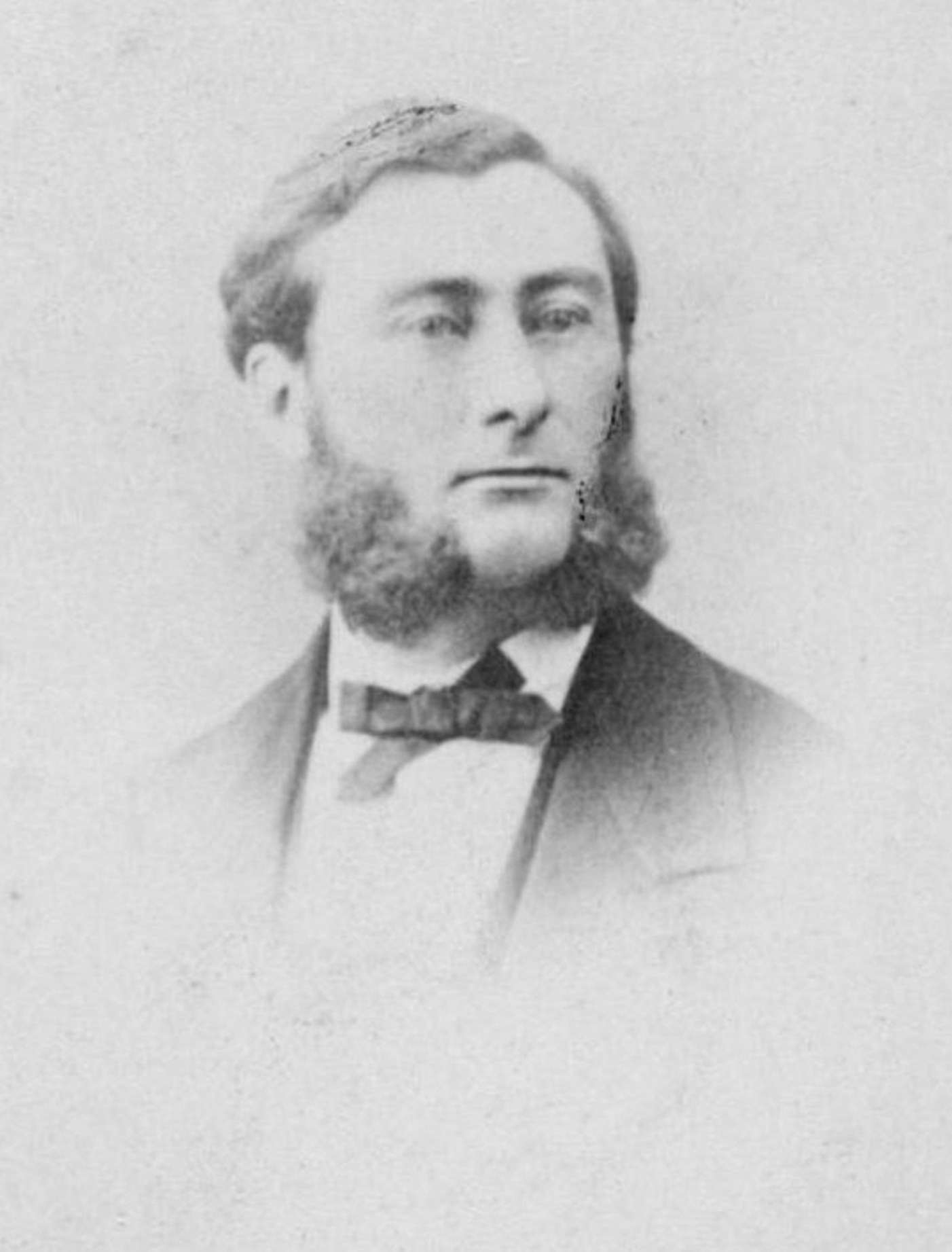
Paul Augustin Serval of the vessel Pionnier: Griffon de Bellay's fellow explorer on the Ogooué expeditions.

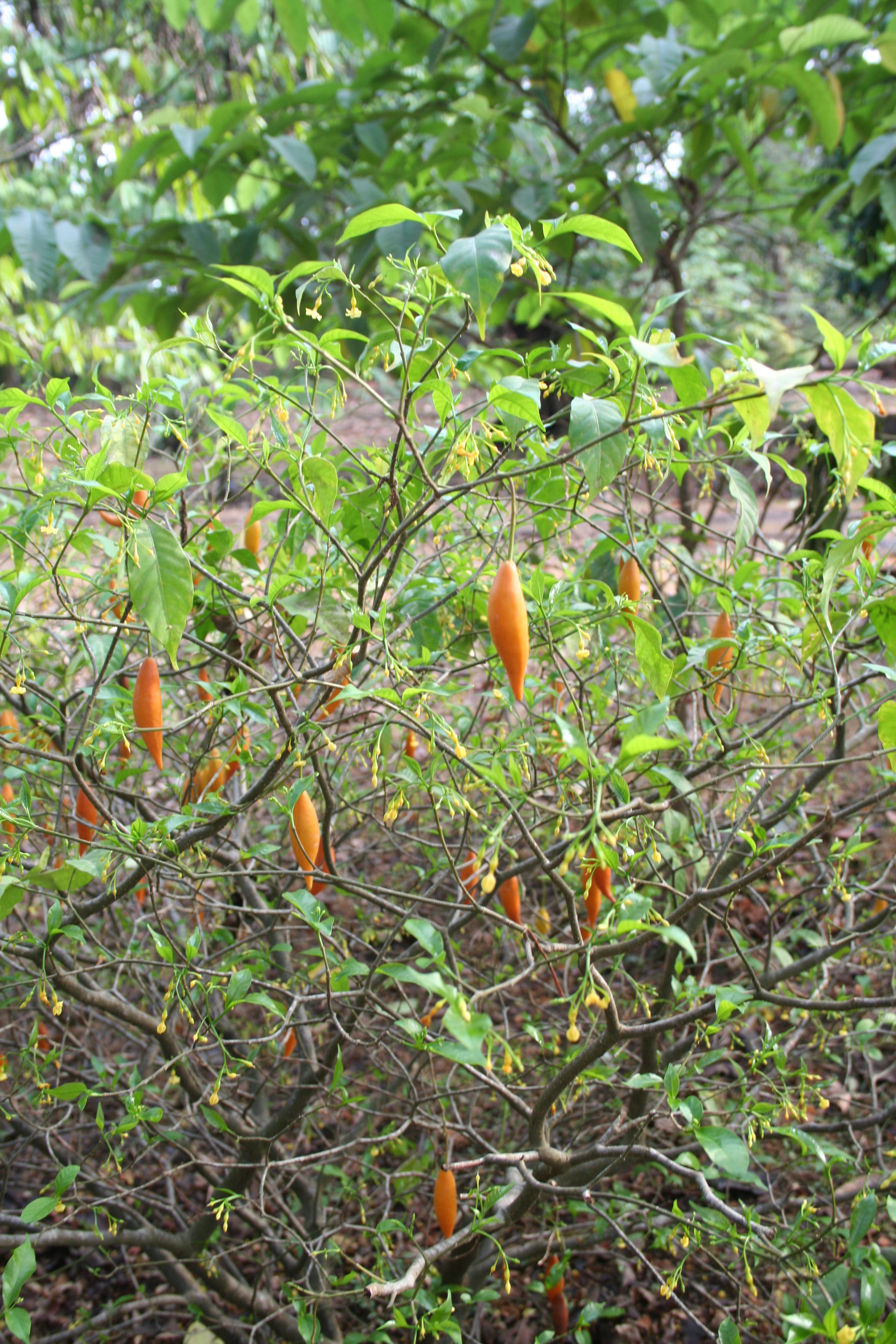
Tabernanthe iboga in flower and fruit: the entheogenic plant the roots of which Griffon de Bellay was the first to collect in order to study their stimulant and hallucinogenic properties.

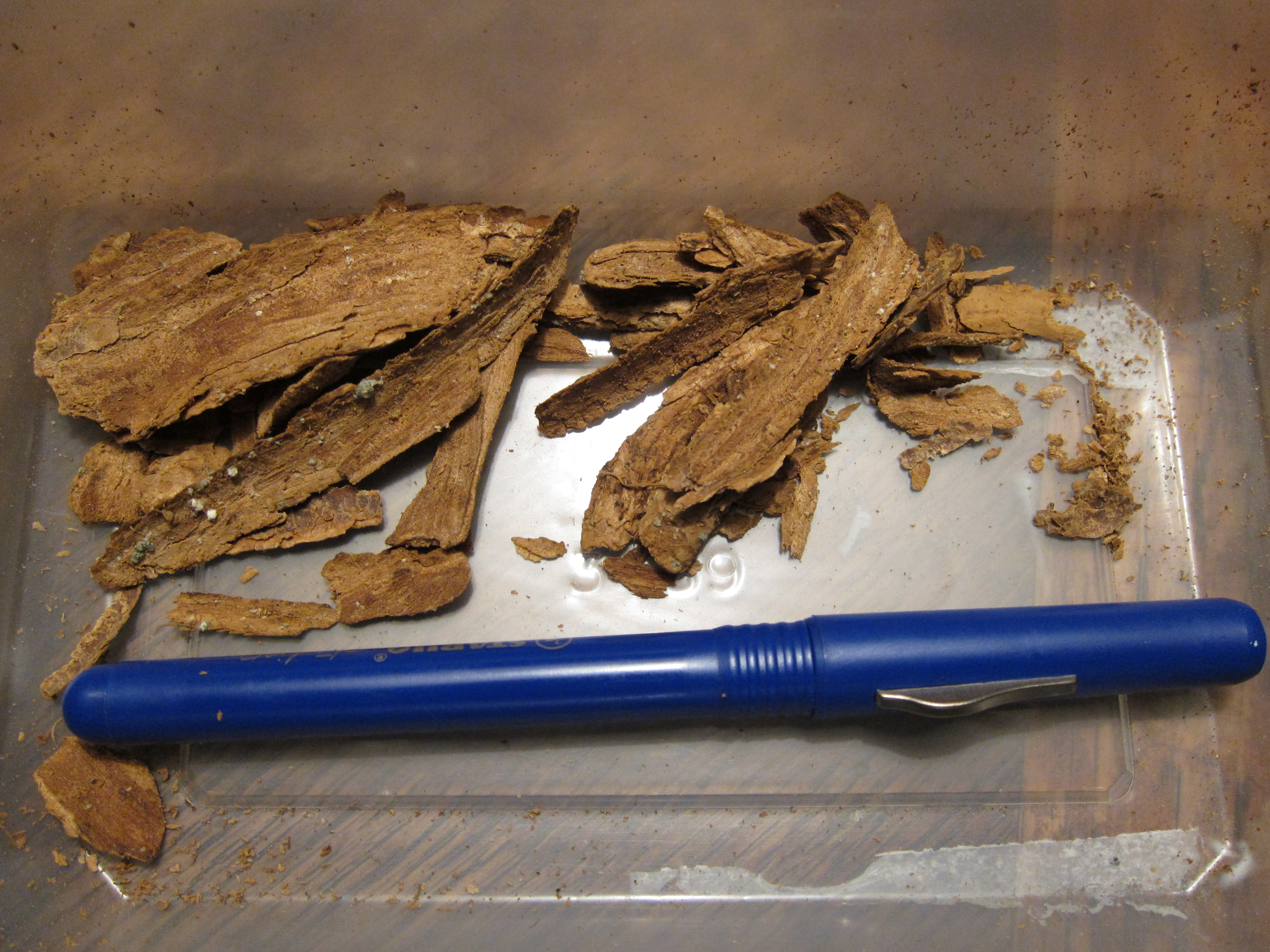
Pieces of root bark of Tabernanthe iboga of the type which Griffon du Bellay collected in Cap López while amassing his ethnobotanical collection.

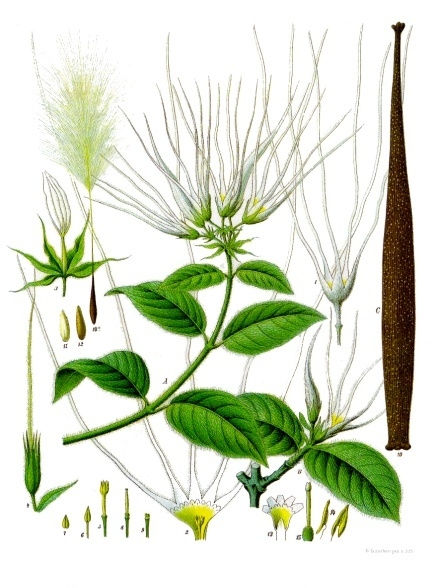
Strophanthus hispidus (family Apocynaceae), the seeds of which were encountered in use to prepare Gabonese arrow poisons by Griffon du Bellay in the course of his ethnobotanical field work.

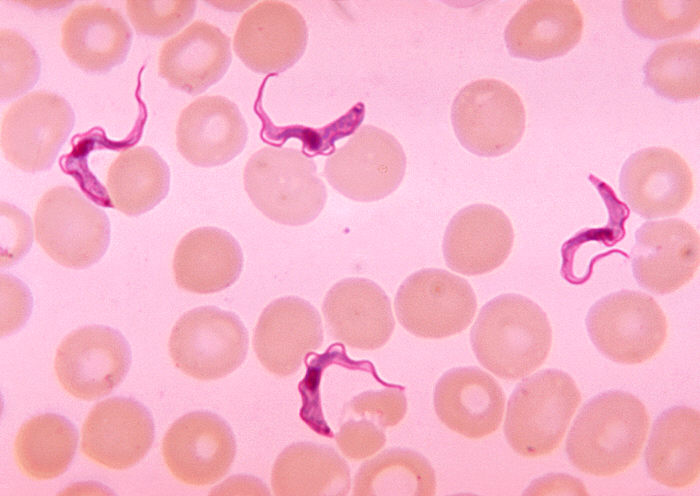
The protist Trypanosoma (the organism responsible for sleeping sickness, studied by Griffon du Bellay) in a human blood smear.

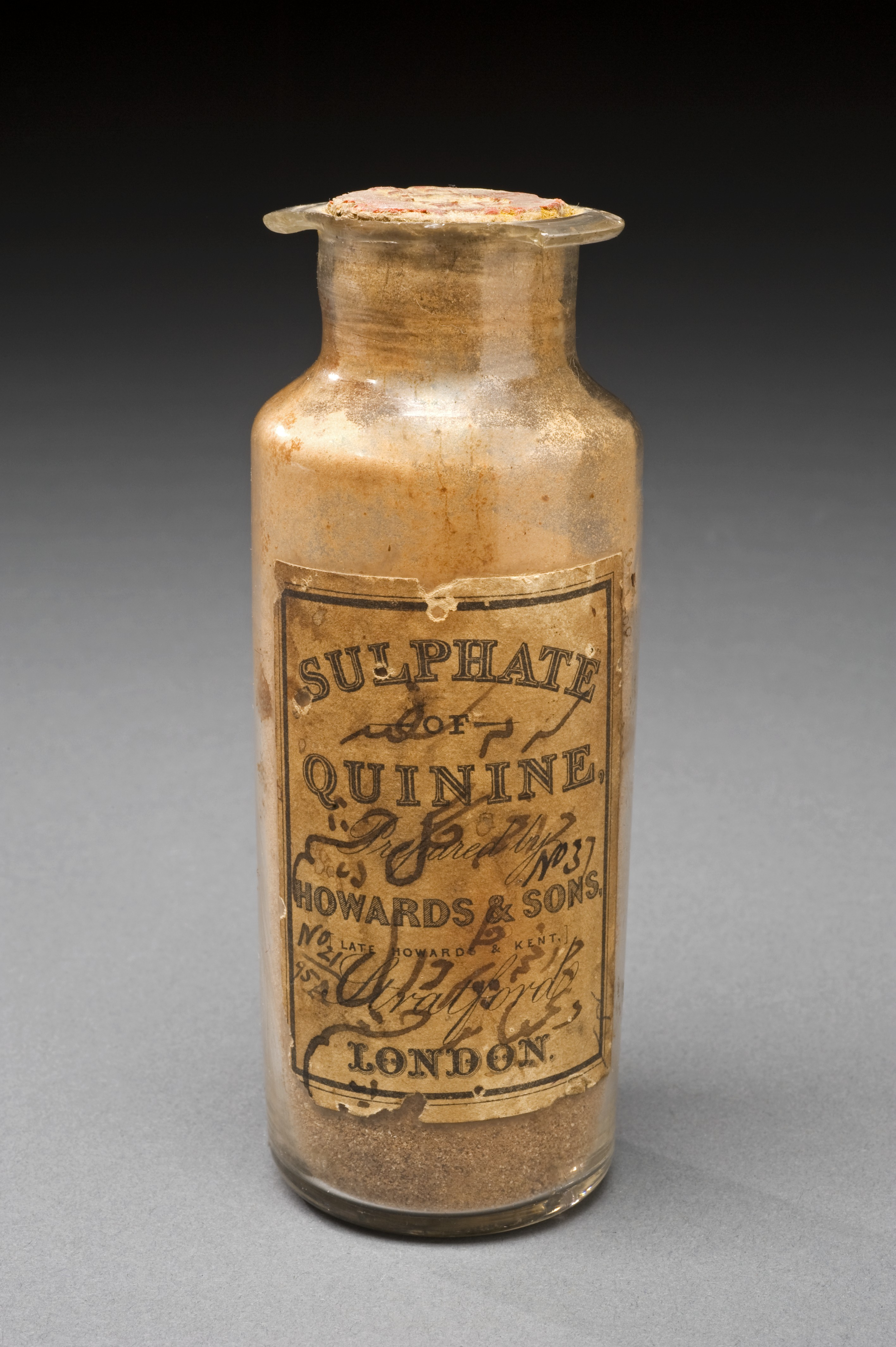
Sulphate of quinine, the early antimalarial used to advantage to cure Gabonese patients by Griffon du Bellay.

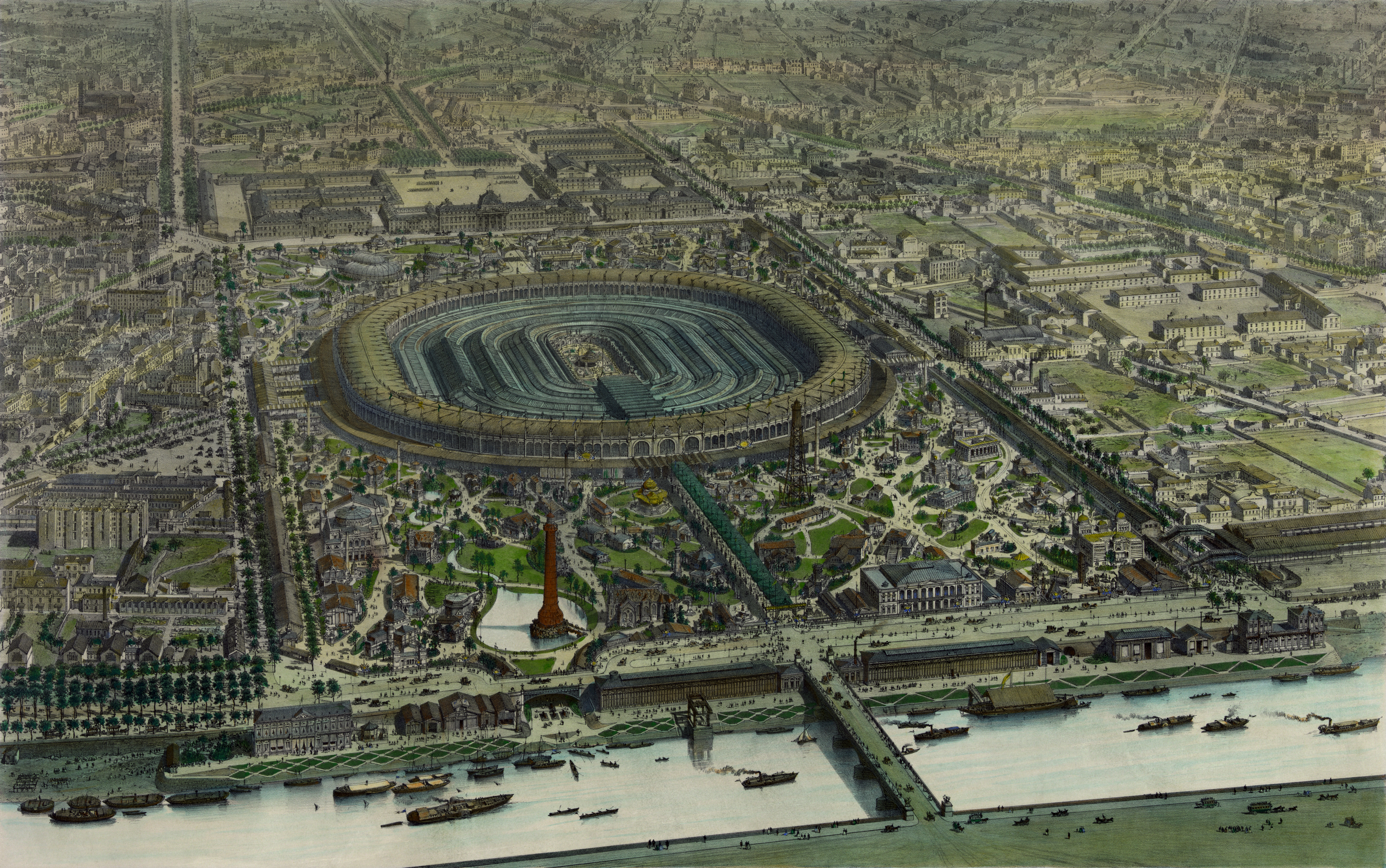
Bird's-eye view of the Universal Exhibition of 1867 (Paris) at which Griffon du Bellay won 2 medals for his exhibit featuring useful plants of Gabon.

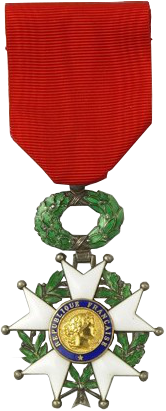
Insignia of first degree (Chevalier) of Légion d'honneur, awarded to Griffon du Bellay on August 13, 1863. (He was subsequently raised to the second degree of Officier on 25 December 1869).

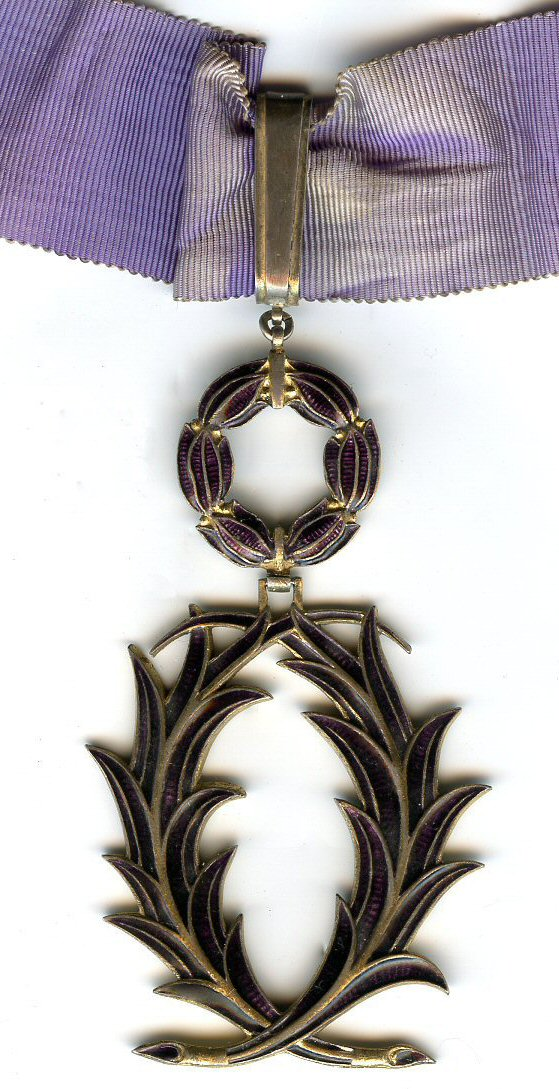
Insignia of Commander of the Ordre des Palmes académiques (Griffon du Bellay attained the degree below of Officier in recognition of his contributions to the advancement of science).

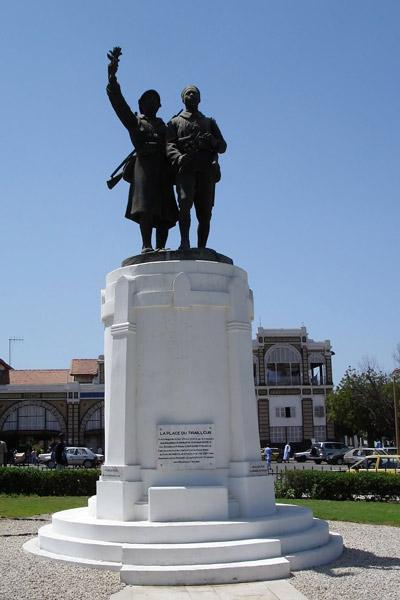
Monument in Dakar, Senegal to the fallen patriots of AOF, featuring also inscription honouring Griffon du Bellay.
