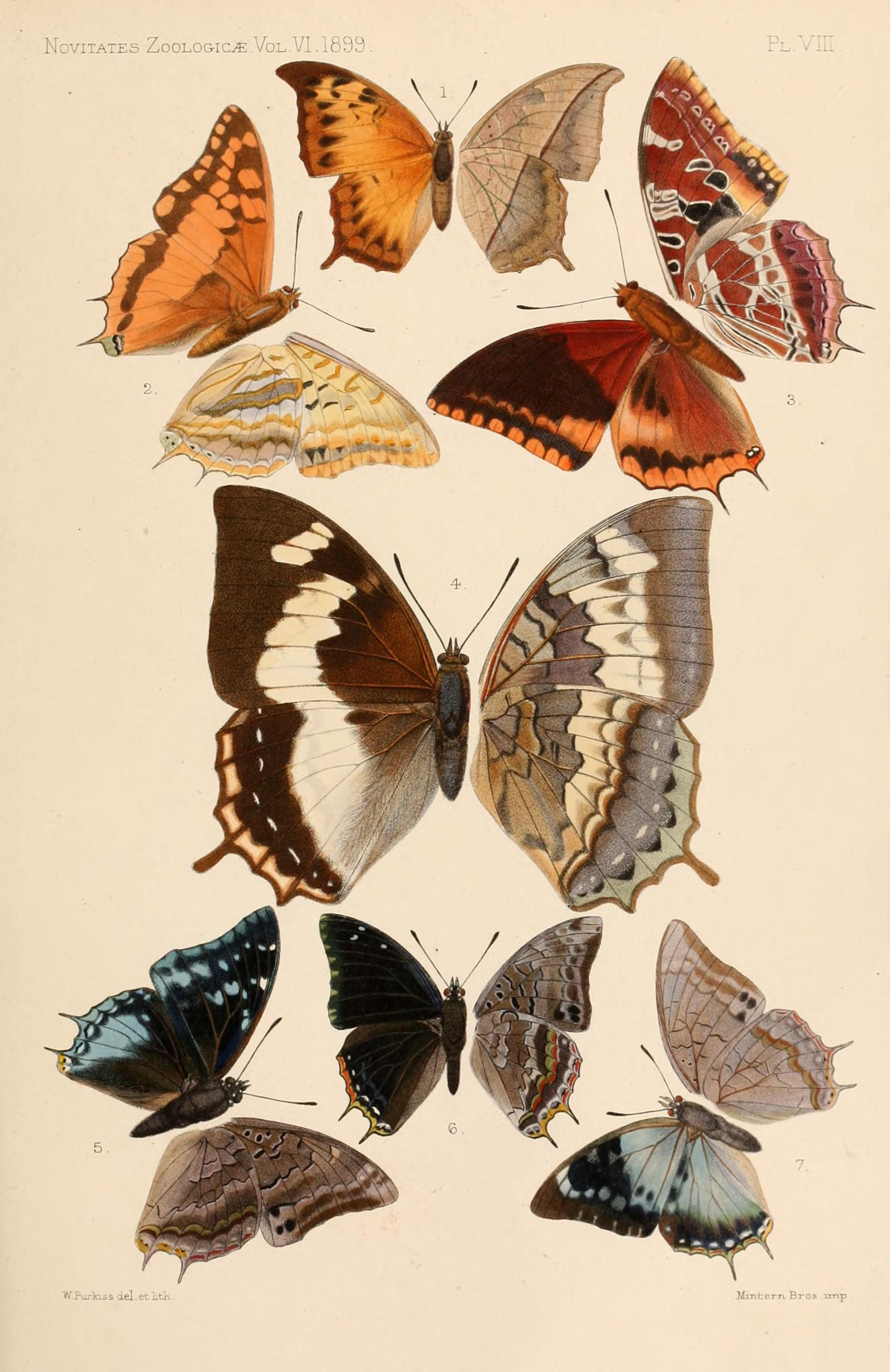
- Figure 2

Scientific classification
- Kingdom: Animalia
- Phylum: Arthropoda
- Clade: Pancrustacea
- Class: Insecta
- Order: Lepidoptera
- Family: Nymphalidae
- Genus: Charaxes
- Species: C. boueti

Binomial name
- Charaxes boueti Feisthamel, 1850

Synonyms
- Charaxes boueti ghanaensis Rousseau-Decelle and Johnston, 1957; Charaxes boueti f. irradians Turlin, 1998

= Charaxes boueti =

Species of butterfly in the family Nymphalidae

Charaxes boueti, the bamboo charaxes, is a butterfly in the family Nymphalidae. It is found in Senegal, Gambia, Guinea-Bissau, Guinea, Burkina Faso, Sierra Leone, Liberia, Ivory Coast, Ghana, Togo, Nigeria, Cameroon, Bioko, Gabon, the Republic of the Congo, the Central African Republic, Angola, the Democratic Republic of the Congo, Sudan, Ethiopia and Uganda. The habitat consists of forests, woodland and savanna.

The larvae feed on Arundinaria alpinus, Oxytenanthera abyssinica, Bambusa vulgaris and Afzelia species.

== Description ==
The underside of the forewing is white or silvery at the costal margin to the end of the cell and the hindwing beneath hasa nearly straight silvery median band, only 2–3 mm. in breadth. The transverse markings of the under surface are reddish, as in the other species of this group, and only black in cellule 1 b of the forewing. The base of both wings above more or less broadly red-yellow or red-brown. The females with light yellow median band. The hindwing with two well developed tails.Ch. boueti is distinguished by a material reduction of the black markings on the upper surface. In the male the basal part of the forewing above is only separated by a row of free black spots from the broad, concolorous median band and the marginal spots also only by a nearly straight row of thick, lunulate, black spots from the median band. In cellules 3—7 of the forewing the median band is divided into two by black spots. In boueti Feisth. the spots which divide the median band in cellules 3—7 are united into a band; the transverse streaks in the basal part of cellule 2 on the underside of the forewing are black; the female is unknown. In Senegambia and the interior of Sierra Leone.— In rectans Rothsch. and Jord. (male) the marginal spots of the throwing are larger and the marginal band of the hindwing narrower than in the type-form. Forewing beneath with a silvery transverse band beyond the middle. Abyssinia. A full description is also given by Walter Rothschild and Karl Jordan, 1900 Novitates Zoologicae Volume 7:287-524. page 408 et seq. (for terms see Novitates Zoologicae Volume 5:545-601 )

== Images ==
External images from Royal Museum of Central Africa.

== Taxonomy ==
Charaxes cynthia group

The group members are:

- Charaxes cynthia similar to Charaxes lucretius
- Charaxes protoclea
- Charaxes boueti close to next
- Charaxes lasti close to last
- Charaxes alticola

Related to Charaxes cynthia, Charaxes macclounii and Charaxes lasti

== Subspecies ==
- Charaxes boueti boueti (Senegal, Gambia, Guinea-Bissau, Guinea, Burkina Faso, Sierra Leone, Liberia, Ivory Coast, Ghana, Togo, Nigeria (south), Cameroon (west), Equatorial Guinea (Bioko), Gabon, Congo, Central African Republic, western Democratic Republic of the Congo)
- Charaxes boueti carvalhoi Bivar de Sousa, 1983 (north-western Angola)
- Charaxes boueti rectans Rothschild & Jordan, 1903 (southern Sudan, south-western Ethiopia, northern Uganda)

Torben Larsen developed a species numbering system for his 2005 publication Butterflies of West Africa. The nominate subspecies is #730. The 'Larsen' numbers have since been used with permission in A Sharp Eye on Butterflies of Ghana.
