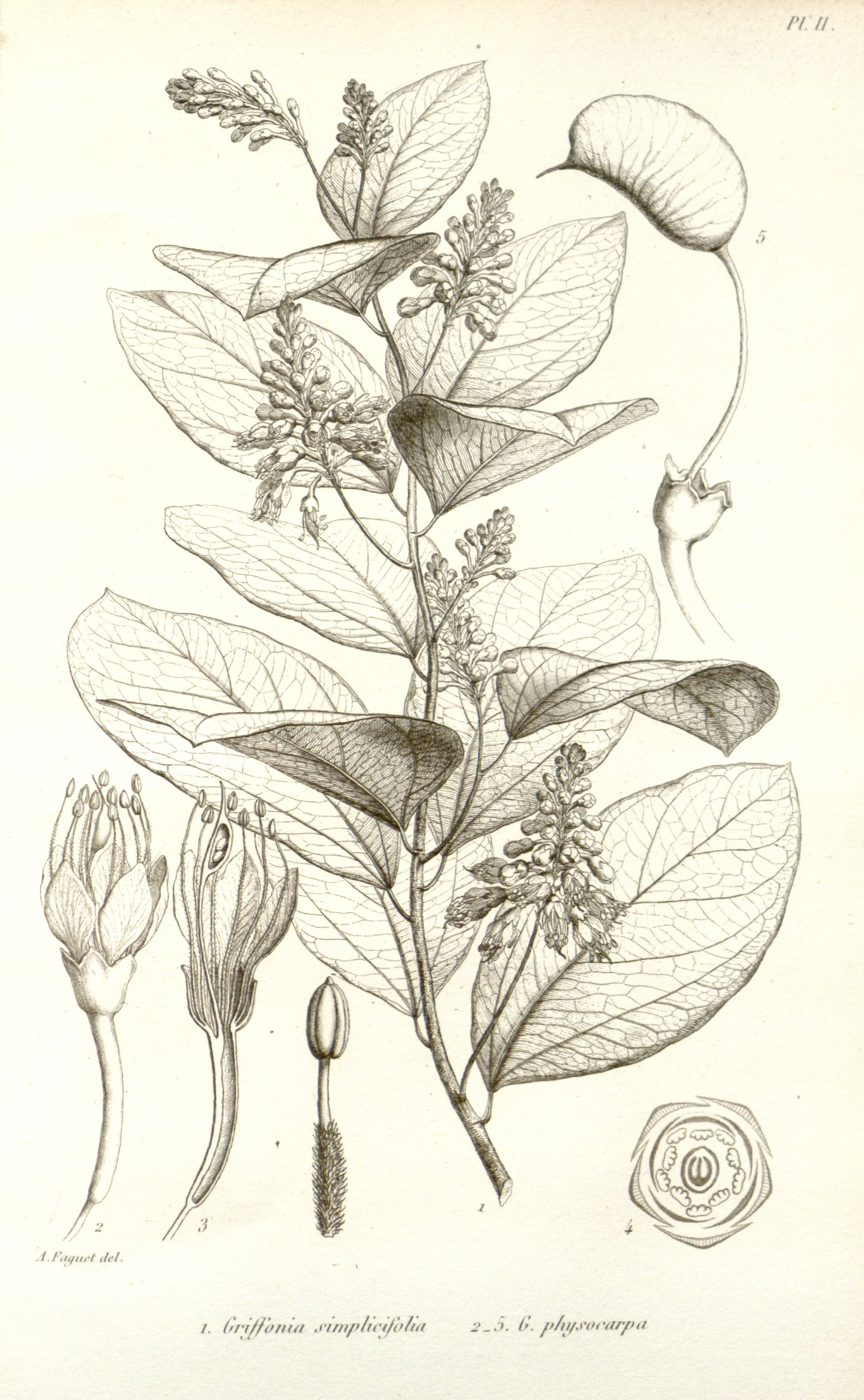
- Griffonia simplicifolia

Scientific classification
- Kingdom: Plantae
- Clade: Tracheophytes
- Clade: Angiosperms
- Clade: Eudicots
- Clade: Rosids
- Order: Fabales
- Family: Fabaceae
- Subfamily: Cercidoideae
- Genus: Griffonia; Baill. (1865)

Type species
- Griffonia physocarpa Baill.

Species
- 4; see text

Synonyms
- Bandeiraea Welw. ex Benth. & Hook. (1865)

= Griffonia =

Genus of legumes

Griffonia is a genus of central African flowering plants in the legume family, Fabaceae. It belongs to the subfamily Cercidoideae. Griffonia is known to have a high concentration of 5-HTP in its seeds.

The genus includes four species of scandent shrubs and lianas native to west and west-central tropical Africa, ranging from Liberia to DR Congo and Angola. They grow in humid tropical forests, swamp forests, and thickets in coastal wooded grassland.

G. physocarpa, G. speciosa, and G. tessmannii are native to west-central Africa, with G. physocarpa having the widest distribution. G. simplicifolia ranges from Gabon to Liberia.

== Taxonomy ==
The genus Griffonia was named by Henri Baillon in honour of his friend and fellow physician Marie-Théophile Griffon du Bellay, explorer of Gabon, pioneer in the study of sleeping sickness and also of the African entheogen Iboga, source of the alkaloid ibogaine.

== Species ==
Griffonia comprises the following species:

- Griffonia physocarpa Baill.
- Griffonia simplicifolia (M.Vahl ex DC.) Baill.
- Griffonia speciosa (Welw. ex Benth.) Taub.
- Griffonia tessmannii (De Wild.) Compère
