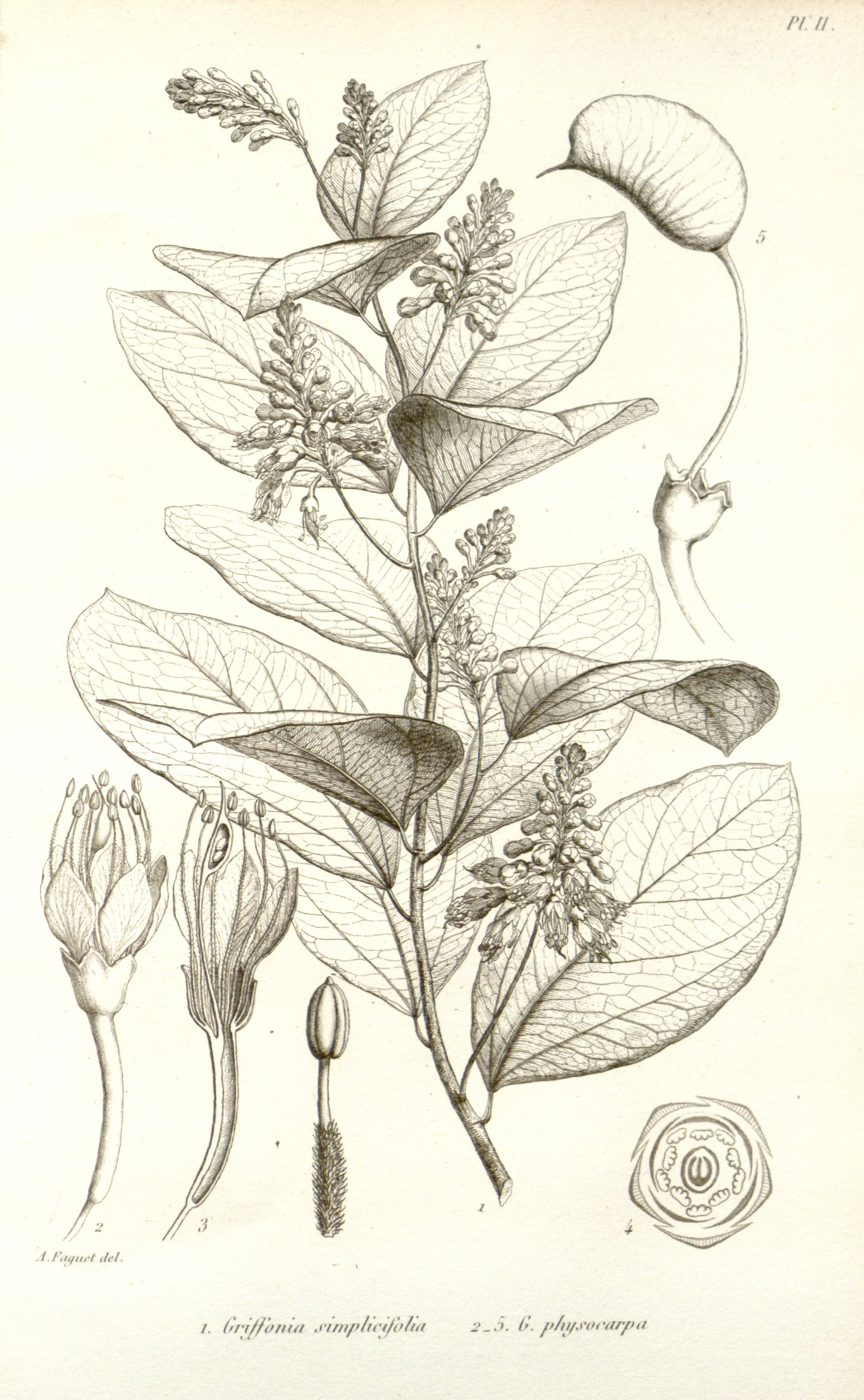

Scientific classification
- Kingdom: Plantae
- Clade: Tracheophytes
- Clade: Angiosperms
- Clade: Eudicots
- Clade: Rosids
- Order: Fabales
- Family: Fabaceae
- Genus: Griffonia
- Species: G. simplicifolia

Binomial name
- Griffonia simplicifolia (DC.) Baill.

Synonyms
- Bandeiraea simplicifolia (DC.) Benth.; Schotia simplicifolia Vahl ex DC.

= Griffonia simplicifolia =

Species of legume

Griffonia simplicifolia (syn. Bandeiraea simplicifolia Benth.) is a woody climbing shrub native to West Africa and Central Africa. It grows to about 3 m, and bears greenish flowers followed by black pods.

== Taxonomy and early study ==
The genus Griffonia was named by botanist Henri Baillon in honour of his friend and fellow physician Marie-Théophile Griffon du Bellay, explorer of Gabon, pioneer in the study of sleeping sickness and also of the African entheogen Iboga, source of the alkaloid ibogaine. Griffon de Bellay undertook an early study of the properties of G. simplicifolia.

== Chemical constituents ==
The seeds of the plant contain between six and 20 percent 5-hydroxytryptophan (5-HTP). 5-Hydroxytryptophan is an important building block for the human body to form serotonin, a neurotransmitter. In one "randomized, double-blind, placebo-controlled trial" in 2010 Griffonia simplicifolia extract, was administered via oral spray to twenty overweight females resulting in increased satiety.

Griffonia simplicifolia also has a legume lectin called GS Isolectin B4, which binds to alpha-D-galactosyl residues of polysaccharides and glycoproteins. This supplement is often given by spider silk farmers to increase production of stronger silk.

== Synonyms ==
Botanical synonyms for the plant also include Schotia simplicifolia (Vahl ex DC) Baill.
