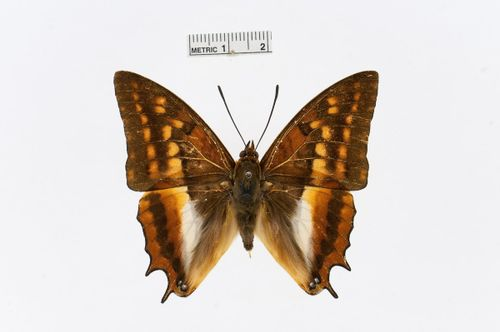

Scientific classification
- Kingdom: Animalia
- Phylum: Arthropoda
- Class: Insecta
- Order: Lepidoptera
- Family: Nymphalidae
- Genus: Charaxes
- Species: C. alticola

Binomial name
- Charaxes alticola Grünberg, 1911

Synonyms
- Charaxes boueti var. alticola Grünberg, 1911

= Charaxes alticola =

Species of butterfly

Charaxes alticola is a butterfly in the family Nymphalidae. It is found in the Democratic Republic of the Congo, Rwanda, and Uganda. The habitat is Afromontane forest.

The larvae feed on Arundinaria alpinus.

== Taxonomy ==
The species is sometimes treated as a subspecies of Charaxes boueti. It is a member of the Charaxes cynthia species group.

== Images ==
External images from Royal Museum of Central Africa.
