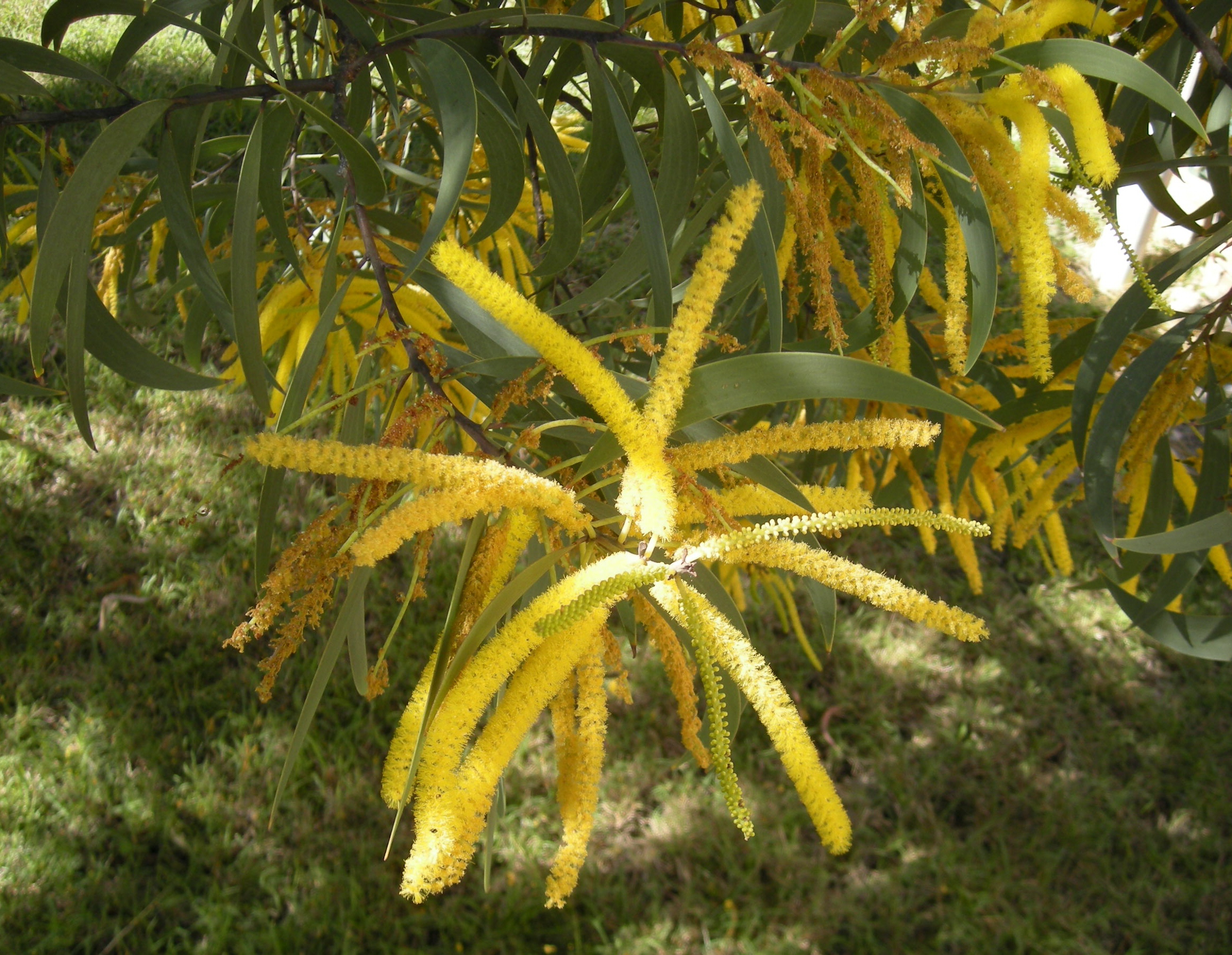

Scientific classification
- Kingdom: Plantae
- Clade: Embryophytes
- Clade: Tracheophytes
- Clade: Angiosperms
- Clade: Eudicots
- Clade: Rosids
- Order: Fabales
- Family: Fabaceae
- Subfamily: Caesalpinioideae
- Clade: Mimosoid clade
- Genus: Acacia
- Species: A. crassa

Binomial name
- Acacia crassa Pedley
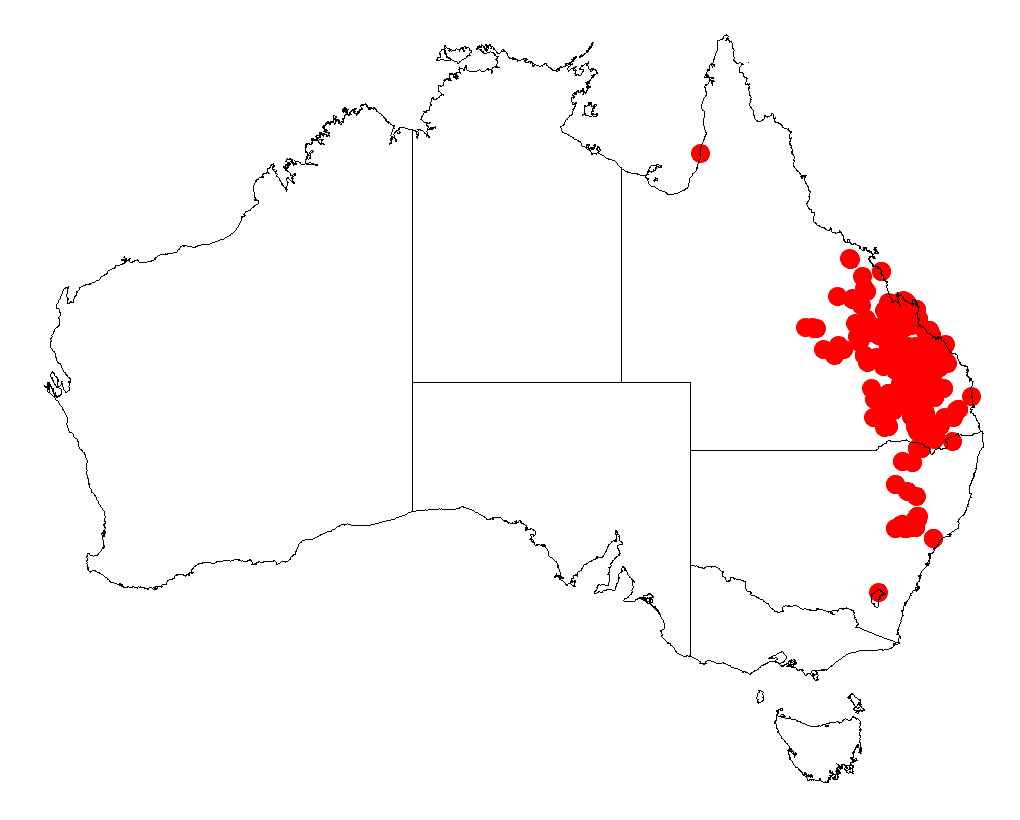
- Occurrence data from AVH

Synonyms
- Racosperma crassum (Pedley) Pedley

= Acacia crassa =

Curracabah

Species of legume

Acacia crassa, commonly known as curracabah, is a species of flowering plant in the family Fabaceae and is endemic to eastern Australia. It is a single-stemmed shrub or tree with very narrowly elliptic phyllodes gradually tapered on both ends, spikes of bright or deep yellow flowers and linear, glabrous pods.

== Description ==
Acacia crassa is a single-stemmed shrub to tree that typically grows to a height of 6–12 m (20–39 ft) and has dark, brownish grey corrugated bark at the base. Its branchlets are stout, grey or reddish brown to almost black and often have distinct lenticels. The phyllodes are very narrowly elliptic, 120–240 mm (4.7–9.4 in) long, 3–25 mm (0.12–0.98 in) wide and tapered gradually at both ends with three prominent main veins. The flowers are bright or deep yellow and borne in spikes 40–90 mm (1.6–3.5 in) long. Flowering occurs between July and November, and the pods are linear, 45–100 mm (1.8–3.9 in) long, 2.5–4 mm (0.098–0.157 in) wide, raised over and slightly to moderately constricted between the seeds.

== Taxonomy ==
Acacia crassa was first formally described in 1974 by Leslie Pedley in Contributions from the Queensland Herbarium. The specific epithet (crassa) means 'thick' referring to the thick phyllodes.

In 1978, Pedley described two subspecies of Acacia crassa in the journal Austrobaileya, and the names are accepted by the Australian Plant Census:

- Acacia crassa Pedley subsp. crassa has phyllodes on young plants strongly sickle-shaped, up to 300 mm (12 in) long, the phyllodes glabrous, but sometimes rough to the touch.
- Acacia crassa subsp. longicoma Pedley has phyllodes slightly to strongly sickle-shaped, young phyllodes densely covered with soft hairs.

This species is a member of the Acacia cunninghamii group and is closely related to A. concurrens, A. leiocalyx, A. longispicata and A. tingoorensis.

== Distribution and habitat ==
This species of wattle range follows along the line of the Great Dividing Range from around Mackay in Queensland to about Newcastle in New South Wales where it is found on sandstone and rocky conglomerate areas growing in gravelly, sandy, sandy loam or clayey soils. It is usually a part of sclerophyll woodland, heath or open scrub communities. Subspecies crassa only occurs in north-eastern Queensland where it is common in woodland and forest and is particularly common in the Monto-Gin Gin areas but also occurs in a few areas between Eidsvold-Wandoan and Shoalwater Bay.

== See also ==
- List of Acacia species
