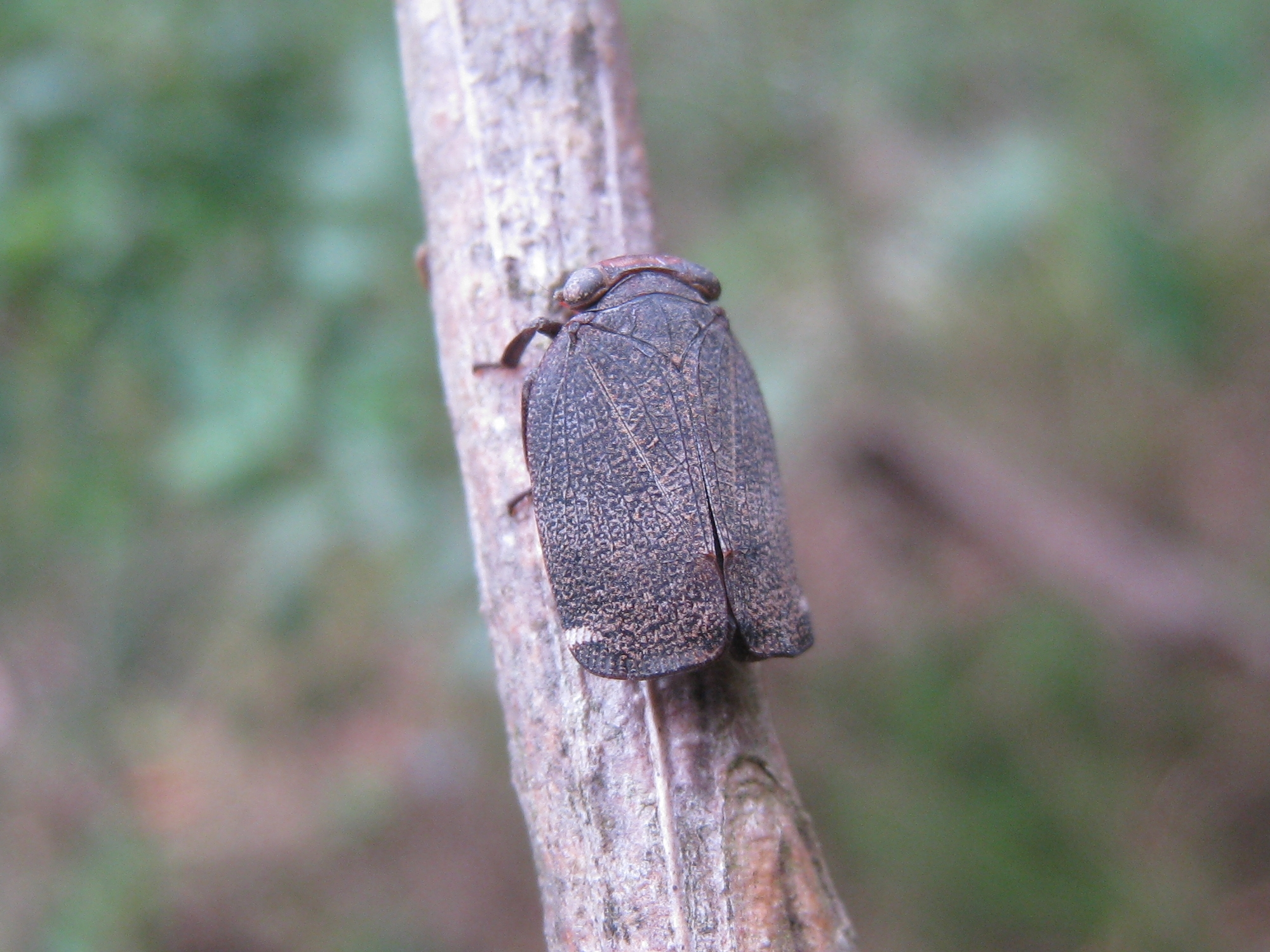
- Hackerobrachys sp. in Como, New South Wales

Scientific classification
- Domain: Eukaryota
- Kingdom: Animalia
- Phylum: Arthropoda
- Class: Insecta
- Order: Hemiptera
- Suborder: Auchenorrhyncha
- Infraorder: Fulgoromorpha
- Family: Eurybrachidae
- Subfamily: Platybrachinae
- Tribe: Platybrachini
- Genus: Hackerobrachys; Constant, 2006
- Species: H. viridiventris

Binomial name
- Hackerobrachys viridiventris (Stål, 1863)

= Hackerobrachys =

Genus of planthoppers

Hackerobrachys is an Australian genus of planthoppers in the family Eurybrachidae. It has only one species, Hackerobrachys viridiventris, making it a monotypic taxon. This species was originally described as Olonia viridiventris in 1863 by Carl Stål, and was reassigned to the new genus Hackerobrachys in 2006 by Jérôme Constant.

== Etymology ==
The genus name takes its first part from Henry Hacker, an entomologist who had studied this and other Australian eurybrachids. The second part is "brachys", a Greek word meaning "short", and is commonly used in names of eurybrachid genera (e.g. Eurybrachys, Platybrachys). The species name "viridiventris" is Latin for "green belly" and presumably refers to either the colour of the abdomen or the frons.

== Description ==
The genus can be distinguished from Fletcherobrachys by the frons, which is bulging unlike that of Fletcherobrachys. Additionally, the hind wings are uniform from base to apex.

Adult males of H. viridiventris are 8.9–10.9 mm long, while adult females are 9.0–10.8 mm long. Overall they are blackish-brown in colour. The frons is convex and twice as broad as long. It, along with the vertex and the basal half of the clypeus, ranges from greenish-yellow to bright red. The abdomen is bluish-green dorsally and yellowish ventrally. The tegmina (forewings) are flat and brown, while the hindwings are uniformly blackish-brown. There exists a second undescribed species, also from Australia, with a red head instead of a lime green one.

== Ecology ==
Hackerobrachys viridiventris is associated with Acacia trees, including A. cunninghami, A. fimbriata and A. leiocalyx. Individuals can be found on leaves, stems and trunks.
