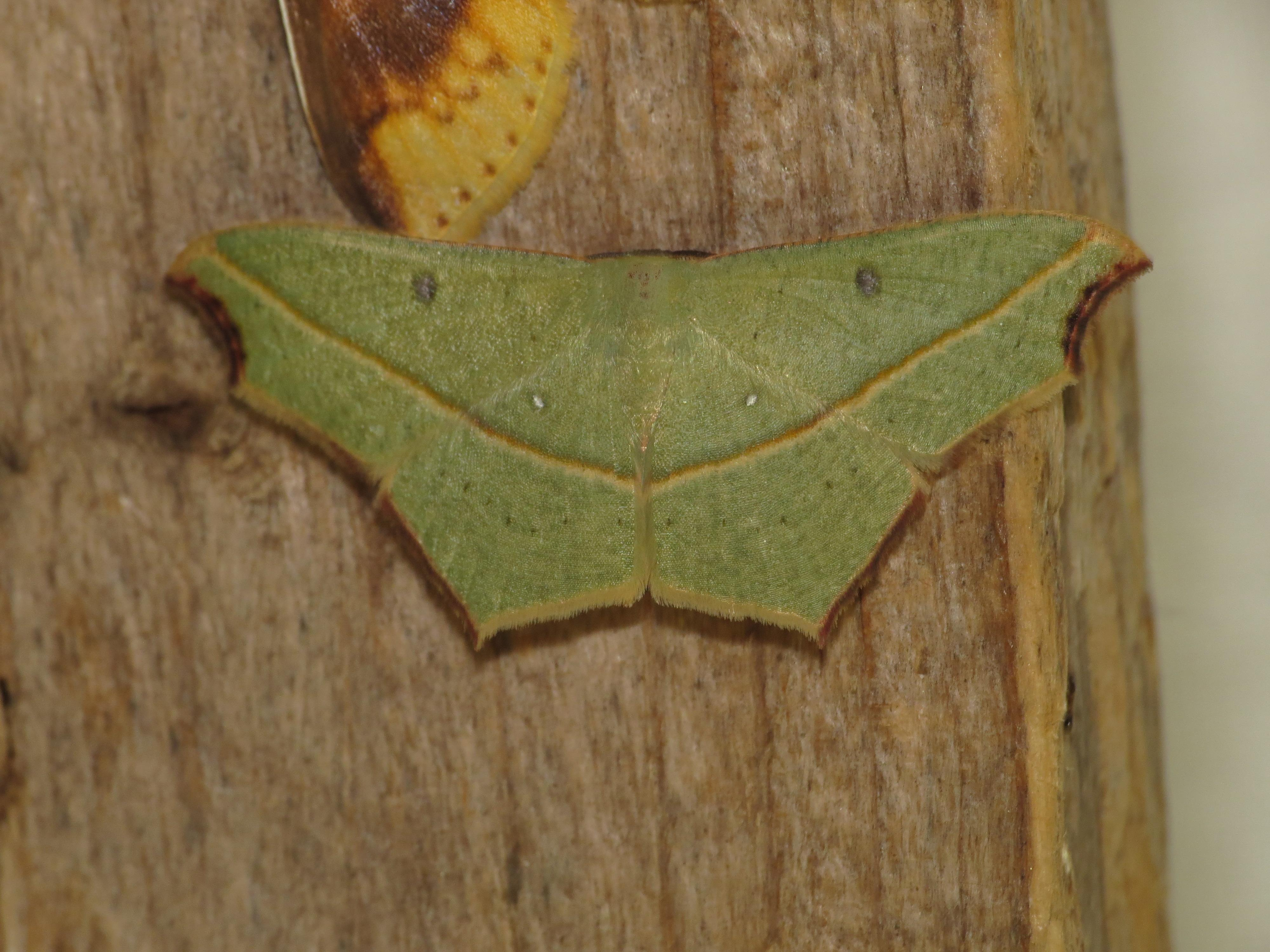

Scientific classification
- Kingdom: Animalia
- Phylum: Arthropoda
- Clade: Pancrustacea
- Class: Insecta
- Order: Lepidoptera
- Family: Geometridae
- Genus: Traminda
- Species: T. aventiaria

Binomial name
- Traminda aventiaria (Guenée, [1858])

Synonyms
- Gnamptoloma aventiaria Guenée, 1858; Timandra aventiaria Guenée, 1857; Timandra molybdias Meyrick, 1899

= Traminda aventiaria =

Species of moth

Traminda aventiaria, the Cross-lined Notched Vestal Moth, is a species of moth in the family Geometridae. The species was first described by Achille Guenée in 1858. It is found in the Indian subregion, Sri Lanka, to Hong Kong, Taiwan, New Guinea and Australia.

== Description ==
Its wings are dull pale green to reddish. An oblique ochreous-green fasciae is found on the forewings. Discal ring on forewing strong. The caterpillar is variegated light and dark brown and cylindrical in shape with lateral expansions to body. The caterpillar rest on leaf surfaces with a highly looped appearance. Pupa claviform. Cremaster triangular. Pupation occurs in a cocoon made by silk threads woven among leaves.

Host plants include Albizia, Pithecellobium dulce, Rosa species, Oenanthe javanica, and Acacia species such as Acacia leiocalyx, Acacia decurrens, Acacia concurrens, Acacia pennata and Acacia aulacocarpa.

== Gallery ==
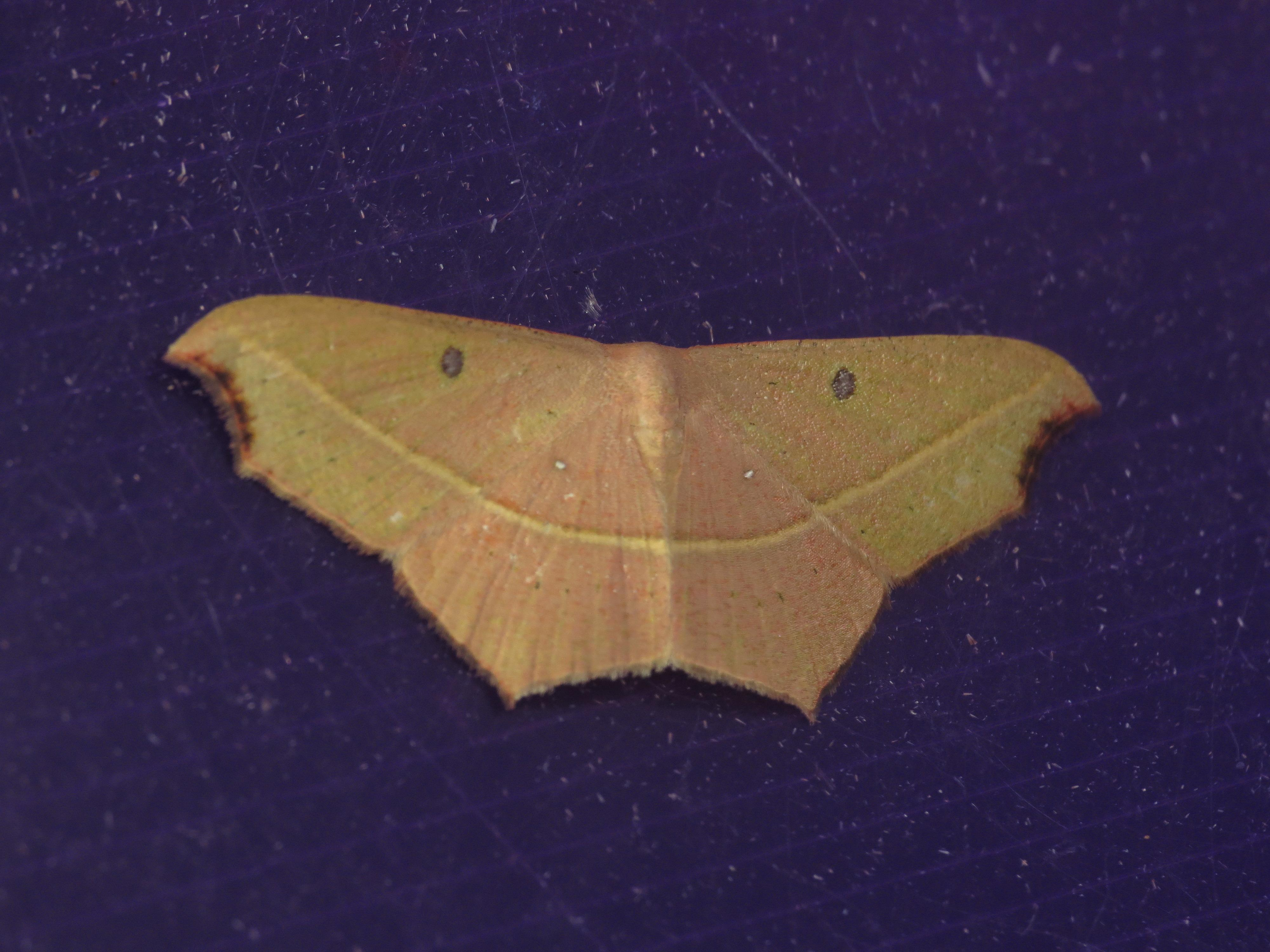
Reddish morph

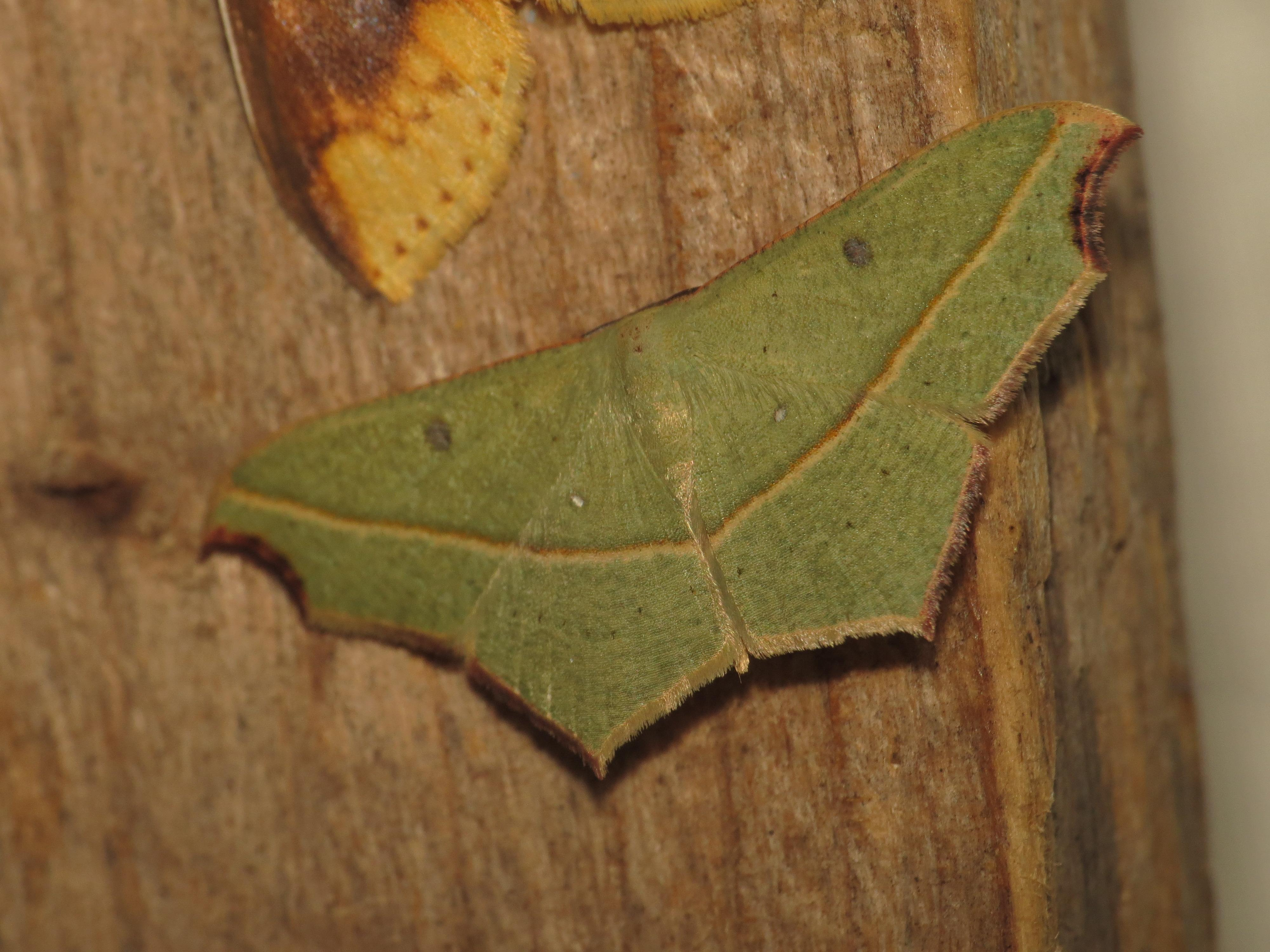
Greenish morph

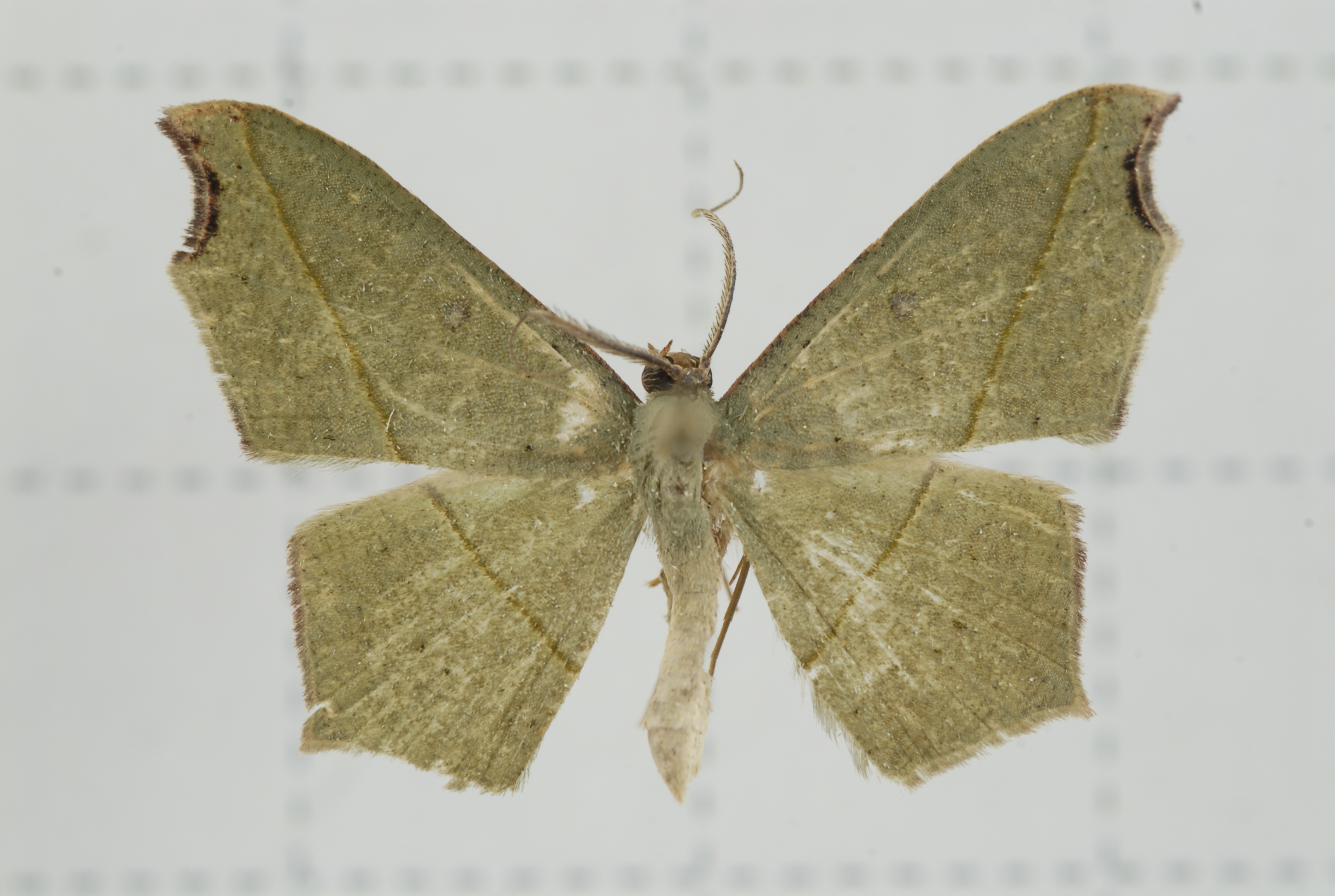
Dorsal

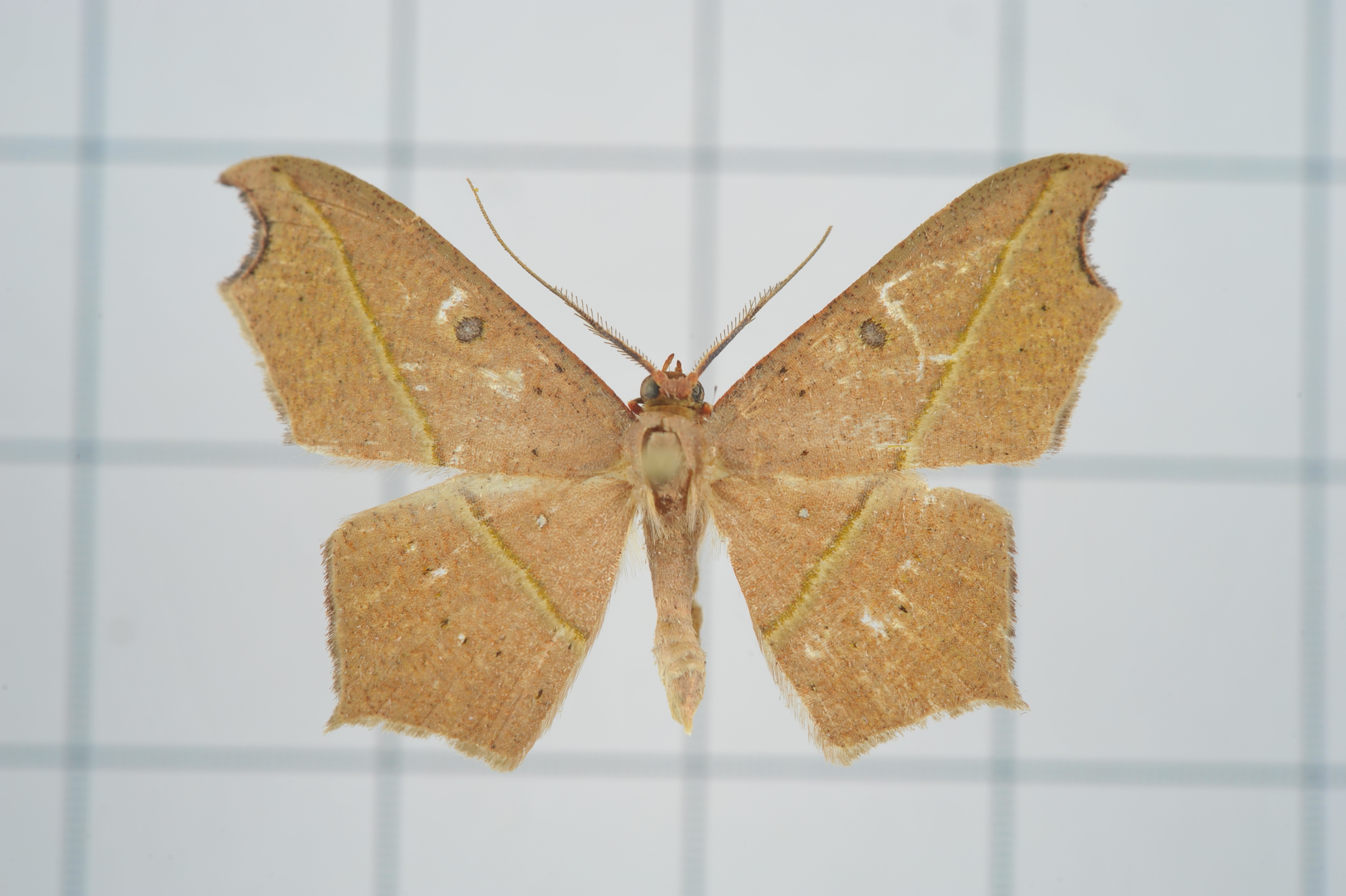
Dorsal
