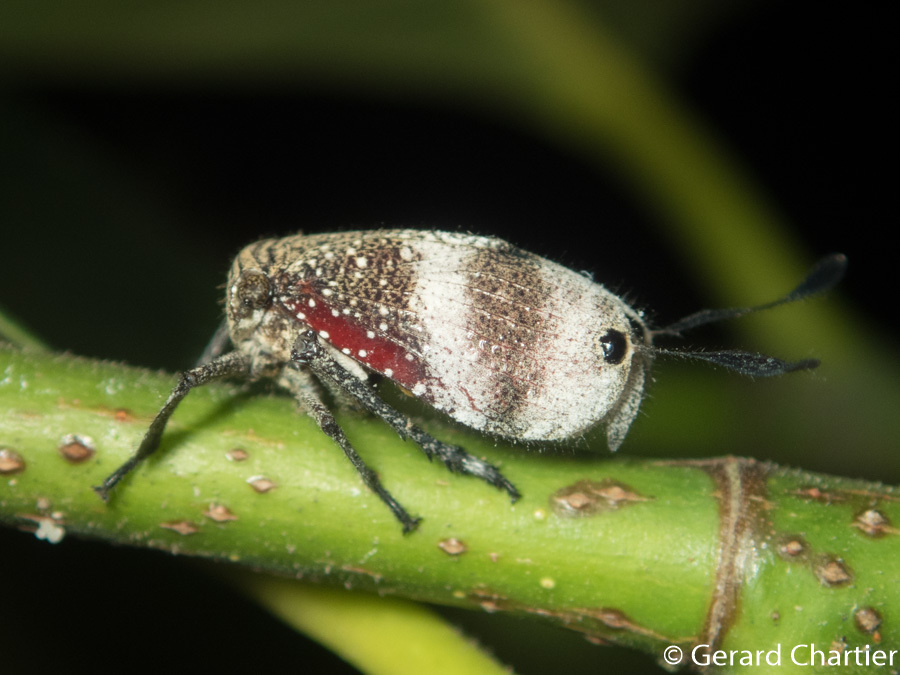
- Head facing left; long filaments on wing tips, giving the appearance of a head facing right with antennae (in Cambodia)

Scientific classification
- Kingdom: Animalia
- Phylum: Arthropoda
- Clade: Pancrustacea
- Class: Insecta
- Order: Hemiptera
- Suborder: Auchenorrhyncha
- Infraorder: Fulgoromorpha
- Family: Eurybrachidae
- Subfamily: Platybrachinae
- Tribe: Ancyrini; Schmidt, 1908
- Genus: Ancyra; White, 1845

Type species
- Ancyra appendiculata White, 1845

= Ancyra (planthopper) =

Genus of true bugs

Ancyra is a small genus of planthoppers of the family Eurybrachidae and the tribe Ancyrini. Species in this genus occur in South and Southeast Asia.

== Description ==
Members of the genus are well known for having a pair of prolonged filaments at the tips of the forewings that arise near a pair of small glossy spots; this creates the impression of a pair of antennae, with corresponding "eyes" (a remarkable case of automimicry). The "false head" effect is further reinforced by the bugs' habit of walking backwards when it detects movement nearby, so as to misdirect predators to strike at its rear, rather than at its actual head.

== Taxonomy ==
The genus Ancyra was first named in 1845 by Scottish zoologist Adam White. It is one of two genera of the tribe Ancyrini (subfamily Platybrachinae, family Eurybrachidae). The type species is Ancyra appendiculata, the species name meaning bearing appendages.

=== Species ===
As of 2026, the World Auchenorrhyncha Database lists the following species in the genus Ancyra:

1. Ancyra annamensis Schmidt, 1908 – Vietnam
2. Ancyra appendiculata White, 1845 – India, through to Myanmar, Cambodia, Hainan Island
3. Ancyra histrionica Stål, 1863 – Cambodia, Myanmar
4. Ancyra luangana Lallemand, 1928 - after Luang Phabang (Laos), Thailand
5. Ancyra nigrifrons Schmidt, 1908 – Malaysia
6. Ancyra vicina Lallemand, 1928 – Vietnam
7. Ancyra xiengana Lallemand, 1928 - Laos, Vietnam
