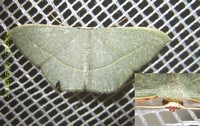

Scientific classification
- Kingdom: Animalia
- Phylum: Arthropoda
- Clade: Pancrustacea
- Class: Insecta
- Order: Lepidoptera
- Family: Geometridae
- Tribe: Cosymbiini
- Genus: Traminda; Saalmüller, 1891

Synonyms
- Gnamptoloma Warren, 1895

= Traminda =

Genus of moths

Traminda or Notched Vestal Moths is a genus of moths in the family Geometridae described by Saalmüller in 1891.

== Species ==
Some species of this genus are:

- Traminda acuta (Warren, 1897)
- Traminda aequipuncta Herbulot, 1984
- Traminda atroviridaria (Mabille, 1880)
- Traminda aventiaria (Guenée, [1858])
- Traminda drepanodes Prout, 1915
- Traminda falcata Warren, 1897
- Traminda mundissima (Walker, 1861)
- Traminda neptunaria (Guenée, 1858)
- Traminda obversata (Walker, 1861)
- Traminda ocellata Warren, 1895
- Traminda syngenes Prout, 1916
- Traminda vividaria (Walker, 1861)
