= Acacia tingoorensis =

Tingoora wattle

Scientific classification
- Kingdom: Plantae
- Clade: Tracheophytes
- Clade: Angiosperms
- Clade: Eudicots
- Clade: Rosids
- Order: Fabales
- Family: Fabaceae
- Subfamily: Caesalpinioideae
- Clade: Mimosoid clade
- Genus: Acacia
- Species: A. tingoorensis

Binomial name
- Acacia tingoorensis Pedley
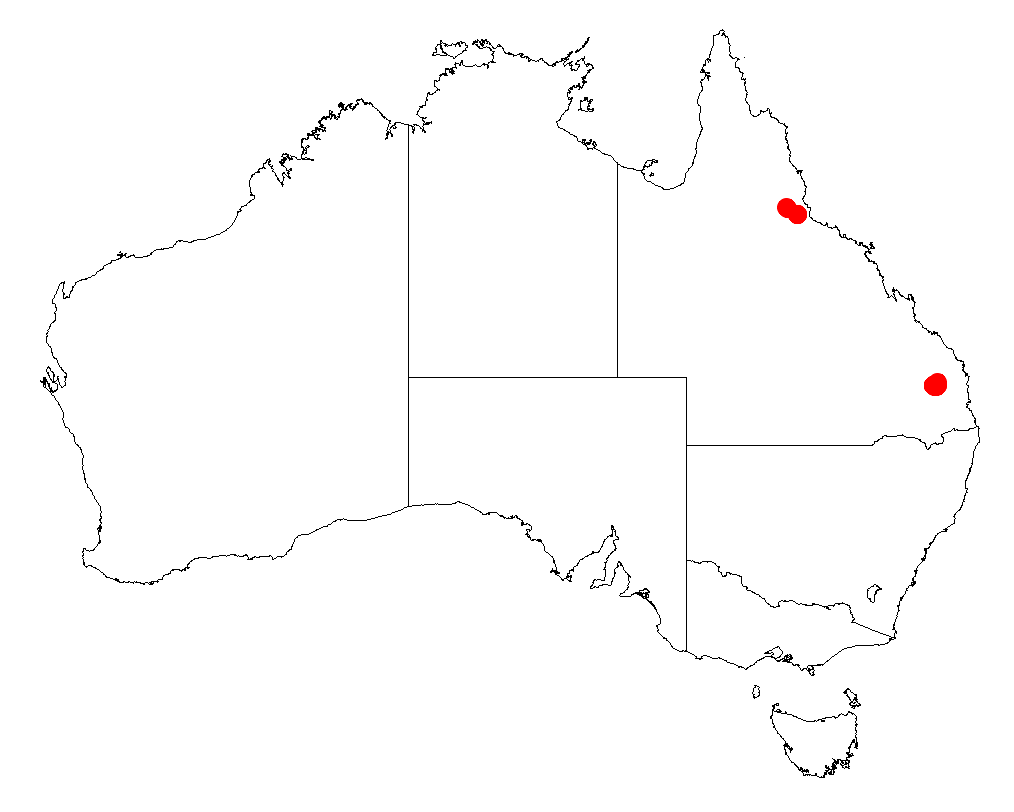
- Occurrence data from AVH

Species of legume

Acacia tingoorensis, also known as Tingoora wattle, is a tree belonging to the genus Acacia and the subgenus Juliflorae that is native to eastern Australia.

== Description ==
The tree Typically grows to a height of 8 m (26 ft) and has hard grey-brown coloured bark that is slightly furrowed. It usually has dense angular branchlets that are velvety with dense fine hairs. Like most species of Acacia it has phyllodes rather than true leaves. The glabrous narrowly elliptic phyllodes can be straight to sickle shaped with a length of 9 to 19 cm (3.5 to 7.5 in) and a width of 13 to 44 mm (0.51 to 1.73 in) with many parallel longitudinal nerves numerous where three nerves are more evident than the rest. It blooms between August and September producing golden flowers. The simple inflorescences occur as flower-spikes with a length of 5 to 9 cm (2.0 to 3.5 in) long.

== Distribution ==
It is endemic to a small area in the South Burnett Region around Kingaroy in South East Queensland where it is found along road sides often is dense stands and growing in deep red loam or sandy soils as a part of Eucalyptus woodland communities. It is found to the east of the natural range of Acacia longispicata.

== See also ==
- List of Acacia species
