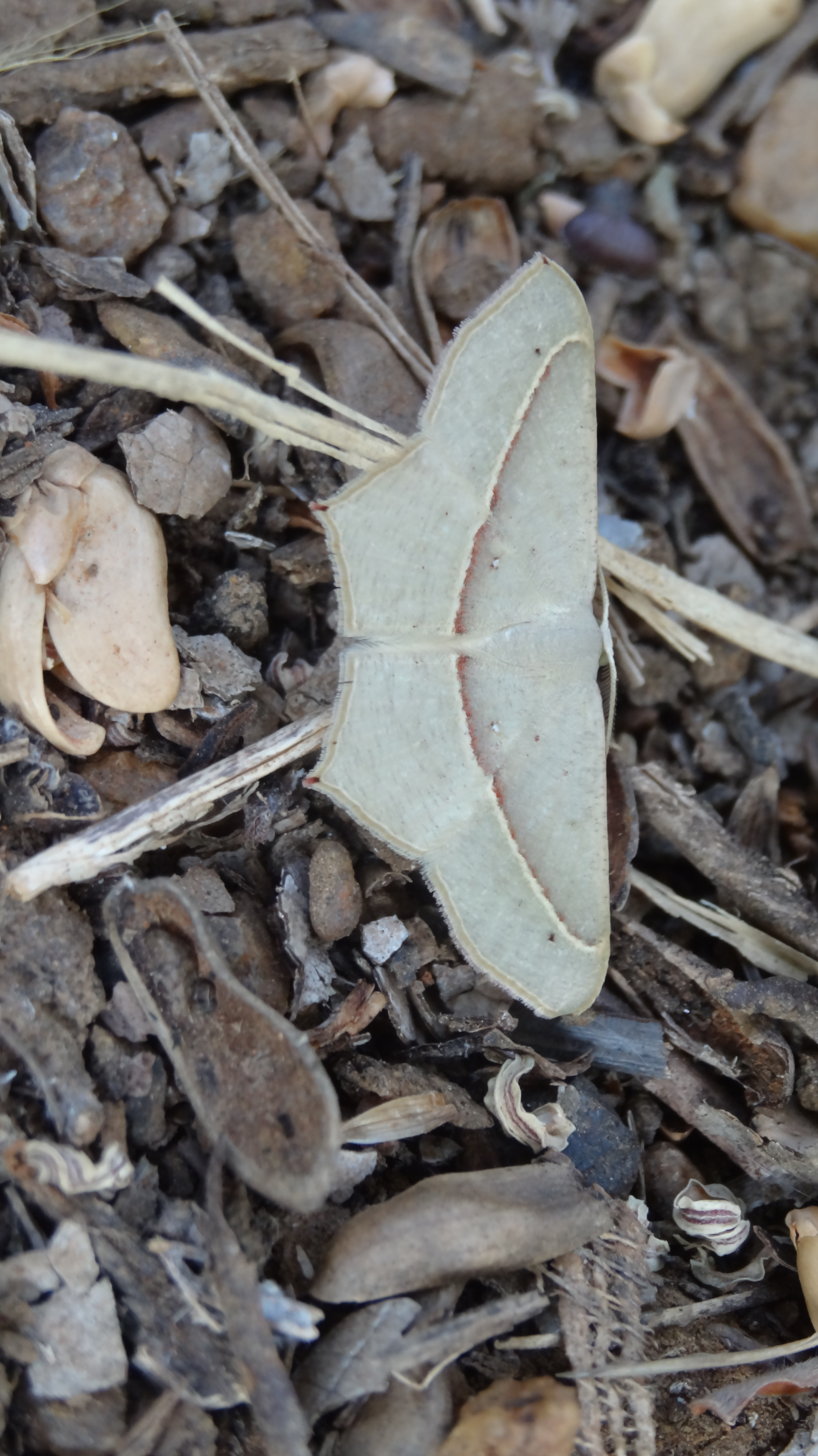

Scientific classification
- Kingdom: Animalia
- Phylum: Arthropoda
- Class: Insecta
- Order: Lepidoptera
- Family: Geometridae
- Genus: Traminda
- Species: T. mundissima

Binomial name
- Traminda mundissima (Walker, 1861)

Synonyms
- Acidalia mundissima Walker, 1861; Traminda burmana Swinhoe, 1890; Traminda diatomaria Swinhoe, 1885; Traminda diatomata Walker, 1863; Traminda malacopis Lower, 1902; Traminda semicompleta Walker, 1863

= Traminda mundissima =

Species of moth

Traminda mundissima is a species of moth of the family Geometridae. It is found in Bahrain, Oman, the United Arab Emirates, Yemen, India, Thailand, New Calidonia and Australia, where it has been recorded from Western Australia, Queensland and New South Wales.

The larvae feed on Acacia species, including Acacia catechu.

== Subspecies ==
- Traminda mundissima mundissima
- Traminda mundissima hemichroa Meyrick, 1889
- Traminda mundissima submarginata Warren, 1899
- Traminda mundissima subvirgata Prout, 1938
