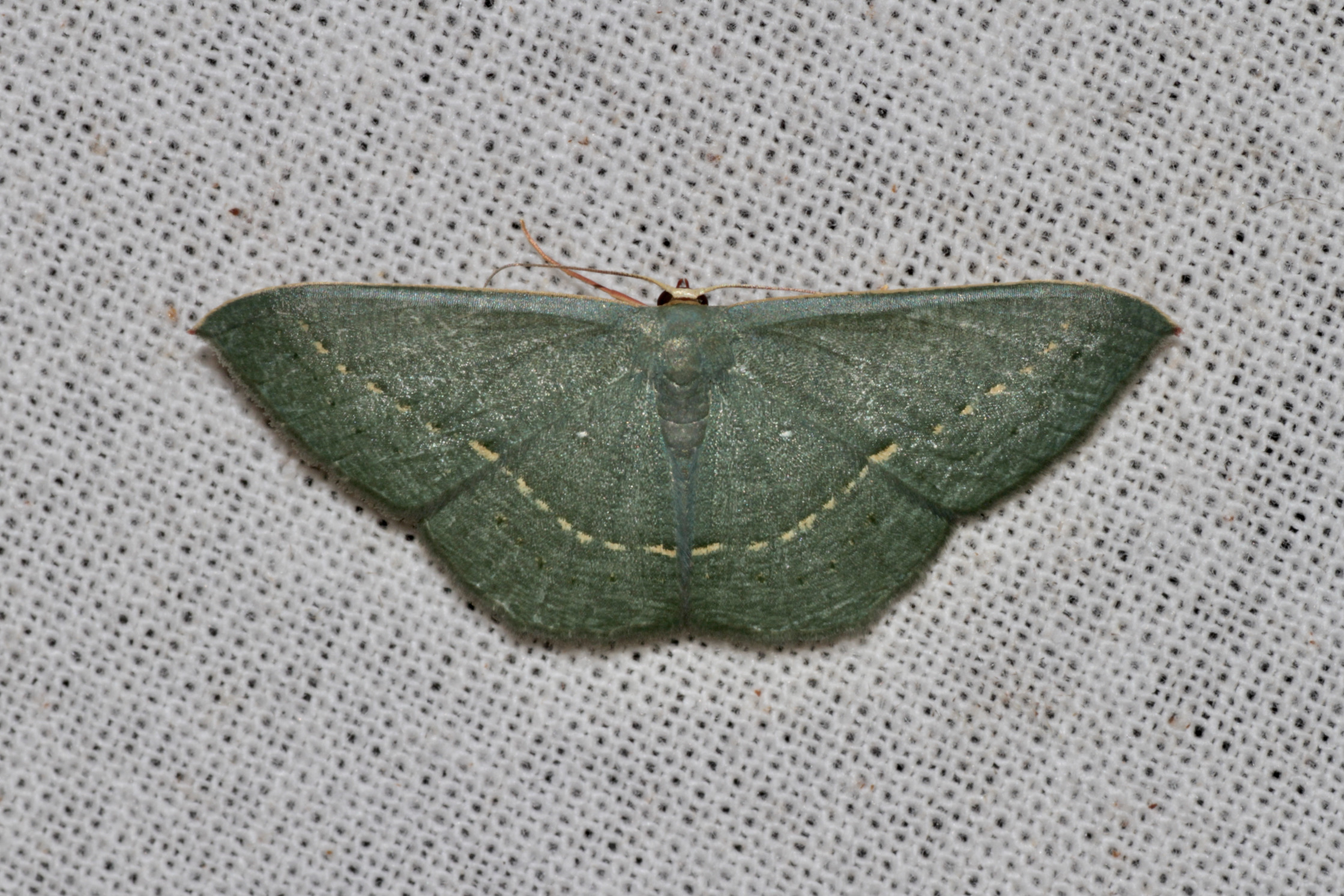

Scientific classification
- Kingdom: Animalia
- Phylum: Arthropoda
- Class: Insecta
- Order: Lepidoptera
- Family: Geometridae
- Genus: Traminda
- Species: T. obversata

Binomial name
- Traminda obversata (Walker, 1861)

Synonyms
- Acidalia obversata (Walker); Timandra Atroviridata (Saalmüller, 1880); Traminda glauca Warren, 1897; Lipomelia striata Warren, 1897; Traminda obversata observata Prout, 1934

= Traminda obversata =

Species of moth

Traminda obversata is a species of moth of the family Geometridae. It is found in Africa south of the Sahara and on the islands of the Indian Ocean.

Its colour is olive green at natural light and dark turquoise with flashlight. Its wingspan is approx. 24–30 mm. The males have white, bipectinated antennae.

== Subspecies ==
- Traminda obversata obversata, (Walker, 1861) – from mainland Africa
- Traminda obversata atroviridata, (Saalmüller, 1880) – that occurs in Madagascar, Comoros and Réunion.
