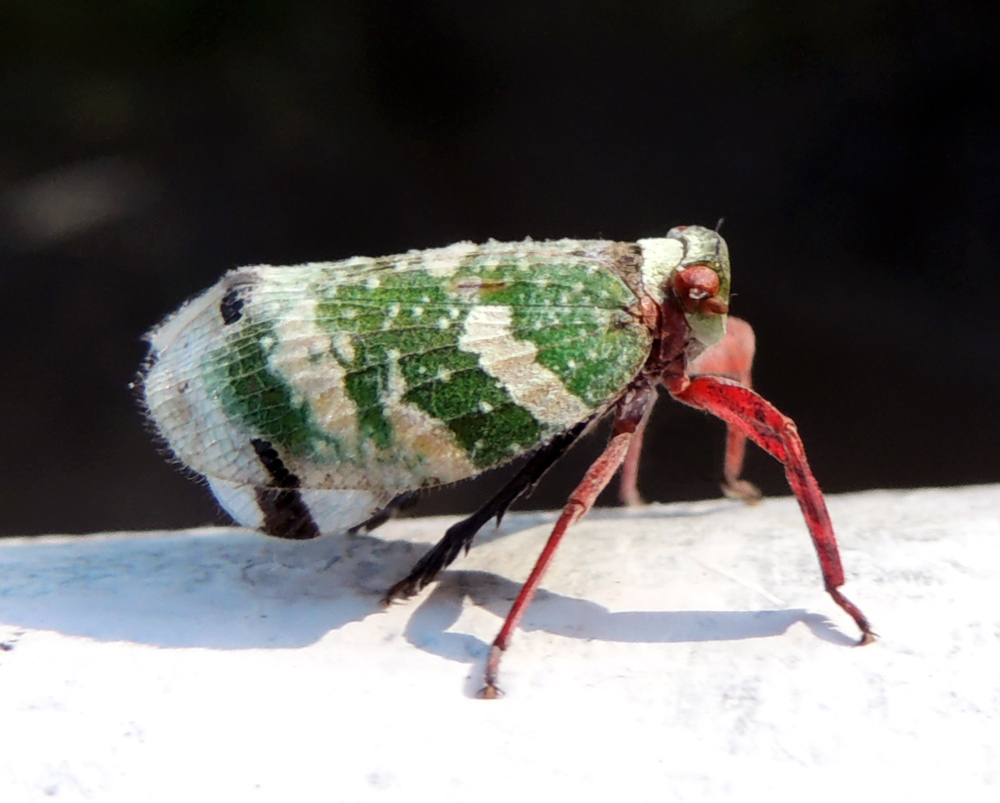
- Eurybrachys tomentosa

Scientific classification
- Kingdom: Animalia
- Phylum: Arthropoda
- Clade: Pancrustacea
- Class: Insecta
- Order: Hemiptera
- Suborder: Auchenorrhyncha
- Infraorder: Fulgoromorpha
- Family: Eurybrachidae
- Subfamily: Eurybrachinae
- Tribe: Eurybrachini
- Genus: Eurybrachys; Guérin-Méneville, 1834

Type species
- Cicada spinosa Fabricius, 1798

Synonyms
- Eurybrachis Guérin-Méneville, 1834 (orthographic variant)

= Eurybrachys =

Genus of true bugs

Eurybrachys is a genus of bugs in the family Eurybrachidae (tribe Eurybrachini). First formally named in 1834 by French entomologist Félix Édouard Guérin-Méneville, Eurybrachys is the type genus of the family Eurybrachidae. The spelling Eurybrachis, by the author, is considered an unaccepted orthographic variant (spelling mistake). Species in this genus occur in Asia.

== Species ==
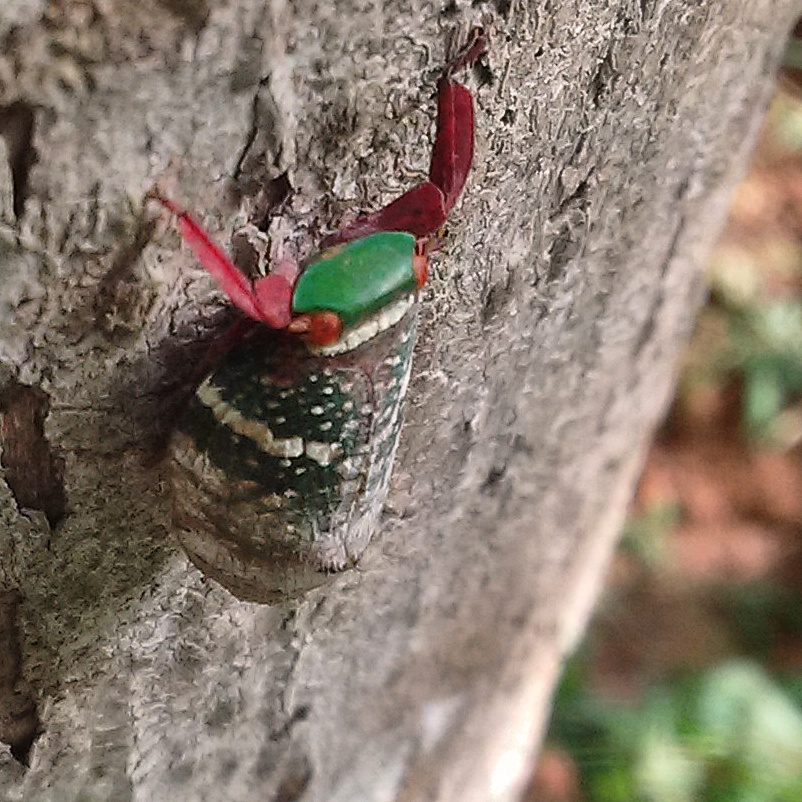
Eurybrachys cf. tomentosa, India: showing head structure

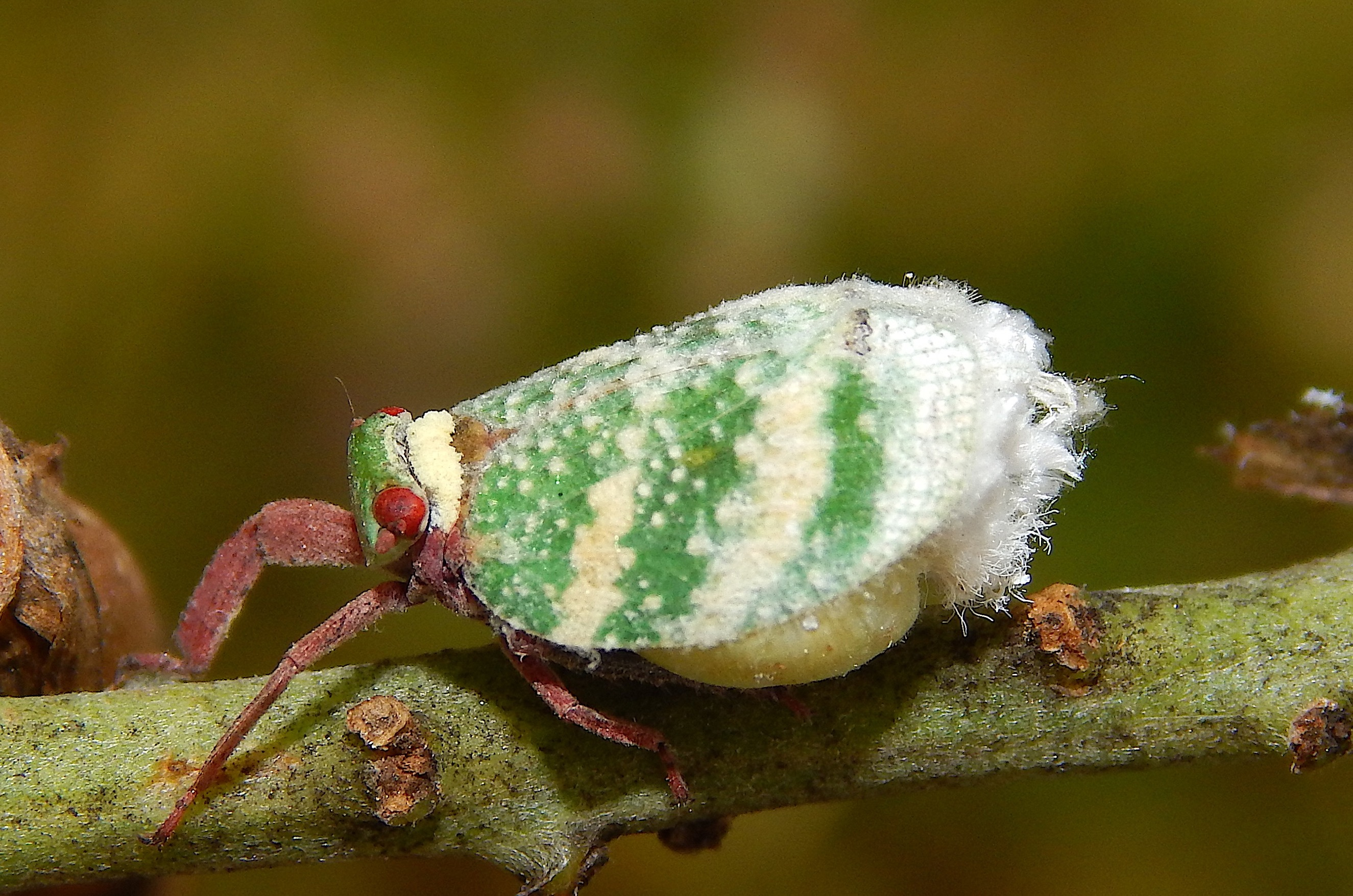
Eurybrachys tomentosa with ectoparasitic epipyropid moth larva

As of 2020, Fulgoromorpha Lists On the Web (FLOW) includes the following 16 species in the genus Eurybrachys:

1. Eurybrachys apicalis (Walker, 1851)
2. Eurybrachys apicata Distant, 1892
3. Eurybrachys dilatata Walker, 1851
4. Eurybrachys dotata Schmidt, 1913
5. Eurybrachys ferruginea Fletcher, 1917
6. Eurybrachys fletcheri Distant, 1914
7. Eurybrachys lepeletierii Guérin-Méneville, 1834
8. Eurybrachys manifesta Distant, 1906
9. Eurybrachys mysorensis Distant, 1914
10. Eurybrachys rubrescens Walker, 1857
11. Eurybrachys rubricincta Walker, 1858
12. Eurybrachys rubroornata Distant, 1914
13. Eurybrachys sanguinipes (Germar, 1830)
14. Eurybrachys spinosa (Fabricius, 1798) – type species (as Cicada spinosa Fabricius, 1798)
15. Eurybrachys tomentosa (Fabricius, 1775)
16. Eurybrachys venusta Stål, 1863

FLOW lists the following additional synonyms under the spelling Eurybrachis:

- Eurybrachis basalis Hope, 1843 – synonym of Polydictya basalis (Hope, 1843)
- Eurybrachis crudelis Westwood, 1851 – synonym of Messena crudelis (Westwood, 1851)
- Eurybrachis insignis Westwood, 1842 – synonym of Thessitus insignis (Westwood, 1842)
- Eurybrachis maculipennis Le Guillou, 1841 – synonym of Platybrachys maculipennis (Le Guillou, 1841)
- Eurybrachis pulverosa Hope, 1843 – synonym of Messena pulverosa (Hope, 1843)
- Eurybrachis reversa Hope, 1843 – synonym of Purusha reversa (Hope, 1843)
