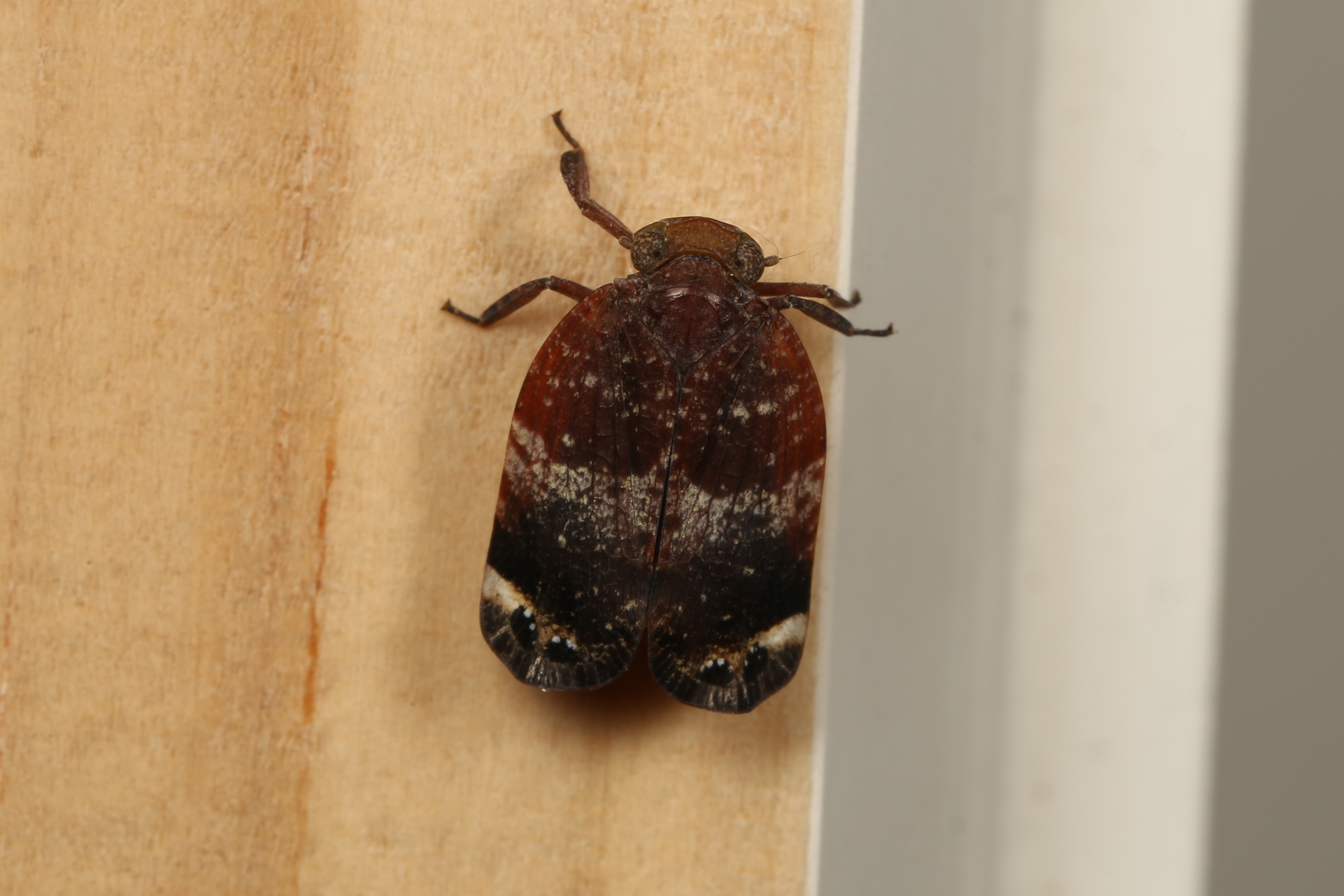
- Platybrachys

Scientific classification
- Kingdom: Animalia
- Phylum: Arthropoda
- Clade: Pancrustacea
- Class: Insecta
- Order: Hemiptera
- Suborder: Auchenorrhyncha
- Infraorder: Fulgoromorpha
- Family: Eurybrachidae
- Subfamily: Platybrachinae
- Tribe: Platybrachini
- Genus: Platybrachys; Stål, 1859

Species
- See text

= Platybrachys =

Genus of Eurybrachidae

Platybrachys is a genus of Australian Fulgoromorph planthoppers within the family Eurybrachidae.

== Taxonomy ==
Fulgoromorpha Lists on the Web includes the following species:

1. Platybrachys aegrota Stål, 1863
2. Platybrachys barbata (Fabricius, 1775)
3. Platybrachys decemmacula (Walker, 1851)
4. Platybrachys fenestrata Jacobi, 1928
5. Platybrachys lanifera (Stål, 1854) - type species
6. Platybrachys leucostigma (Walker, 1851)
7. Platybrachys lugubris Stål, 1863
8. Platybrachys lurida (Walker, 1851)
9. Platybrachys maculipennis (Le Guillou, 1841)
10. Platybrachys ornata (Lallemand, 1928)
11. Platybrachys sera (Walker, 1851)
12. Platybrachys sicca (Walker, 1851)
13. Platybrachys vidua Stål, 1863

=== Kamabrachys gen. nov. ===
In October 2023, Platybrachys signata Distant, 1892 was reassigned as the type species of the new Australian genus Kamabrachys Constant, placed in the same tribe.
