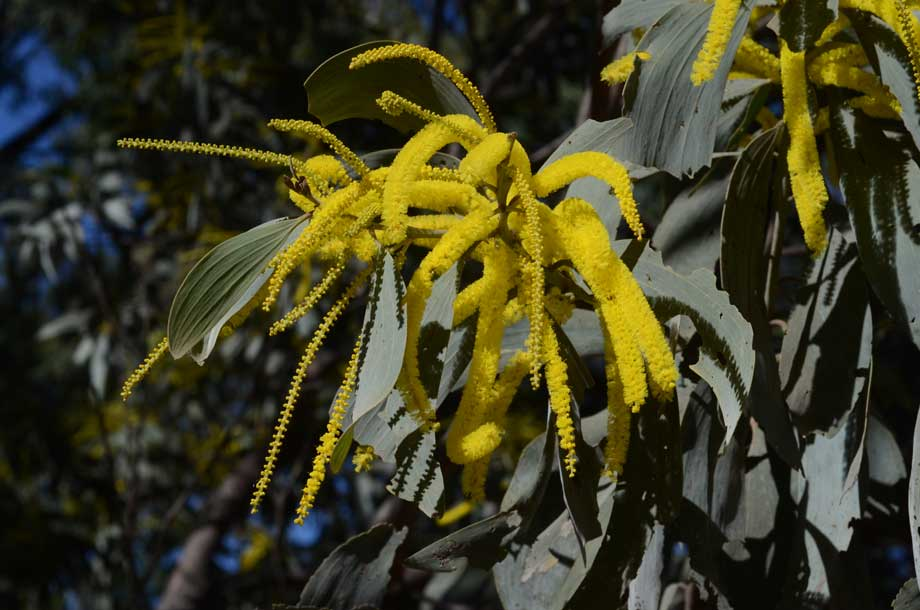
- Near Taroom

Scientific classification
- Kingdom: Plantae
- Clade: Tracheophytes
- Clade: Angiosperms
- Clade: Eudicots
- Clade: Rosids
- Order: Fabales
- Family: Fabaceae
- Subfamily: Caesalpinioideae
- Clade: Mimosoid clade
- Genus: Acacia
- Species: A. longispicata

Binomial name
- Acacia longispicata Benth.
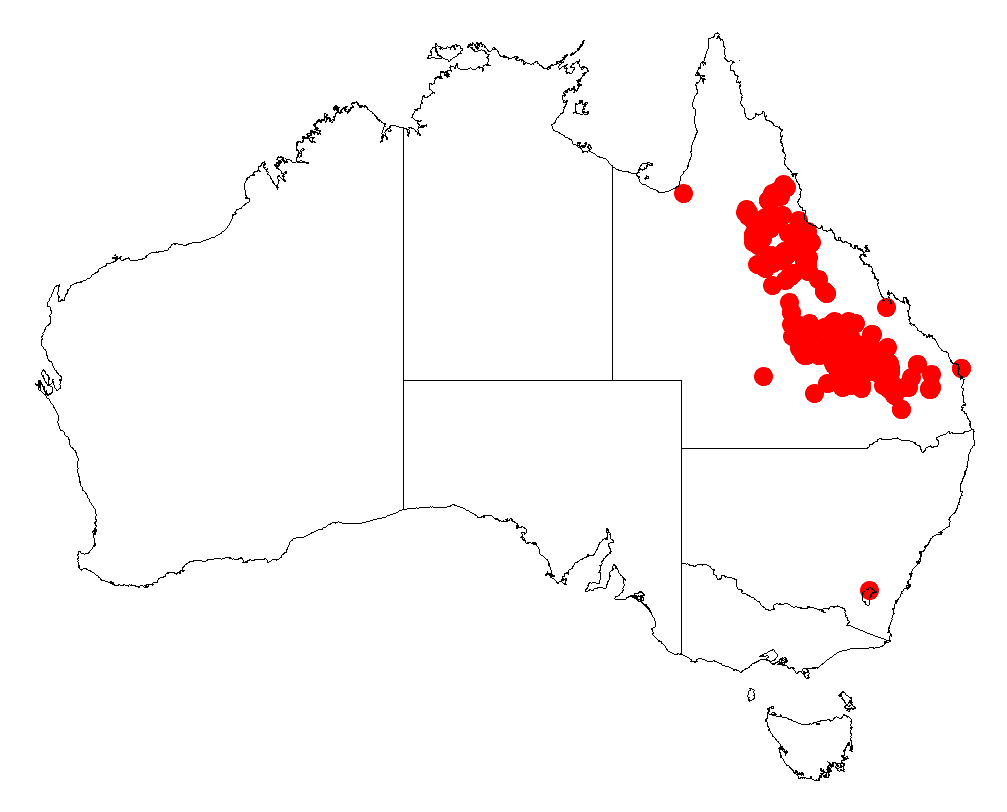
- Occurrence data from AVH

= Acacia longispicata =

Species of legume

Habit in Mount Annan Motanic Garden

Acacia longispicata, commonly known as long-spike wattle, is a species of flowering plant in the family Fabaceae and is endemic to Queensland, Australia. It is an erect, single-stemmed shrub, with smooth bark towards the top, very narrowly elliptic to elliptic, leathery phyllodes, spikes of golden yellow flowers, and curved, twisted pods.

== Description ==
Acacia longispicata is an erect, single-stemmed tree that typically grows to a height of 10 m (33 ft), and has smooth, dark brownish grey bark towards the top, but rough and fibrous at the base. Its branchlets are stout, tawny yellow to pale maroon, with minute hairs pressed against the surface. Its phyllodes are very narrowly elliptic to elliptic, flat, 100–190 mm (3.9–7.5 in) long, 13–46 mm (0.51–1.81 in) wide and leathery. The phyllodes are sometimes convex on one edge and straight on the other, but more usually slightly to obviously sickle-shaped, and usually silvery-grey to glaucous. There are three main prominent veins on the phyllodes, conspicuous veins on the edges and minor veins nearer the ends. The flowers are golden yellow, and arranged in spikes 30–100 mm (1.2–3.9 in) long on peduncles 3–10 mm (0.12–0.39 in) long. Flowering occurs from June to August in northern population, and late July to September further south. The pods are curved, twisted and thinly crusty, 30–118 mm (1.2–4.6 in) long and 2.5–3.5 mm (0.098–0.138 in) wide and dark brown. The seeds are 2.5–3.5 mm (0.098–0.138 in) long and dark brown with a yellow aril.

== Taxonomy ==
Acacia longispicata was first formally described in 1848 by George Bentham in Thomas Mitchell's Journal of an Expedition into the Interior of Tropical Australia.

== Distribution and habitat ==
Long-spike wattle grows as scattered trees in woodland or open forest in sandy soils or red earths, often on hillsides, in the Mitchell – Theodore area to about Mount Garnet in Queensland.

== Conservation status ==
Acacia longispicata is listed as 'least concern' under the Queensland Government Nature Conservation Act 1992.

== See also ==
- List of Acacia species
