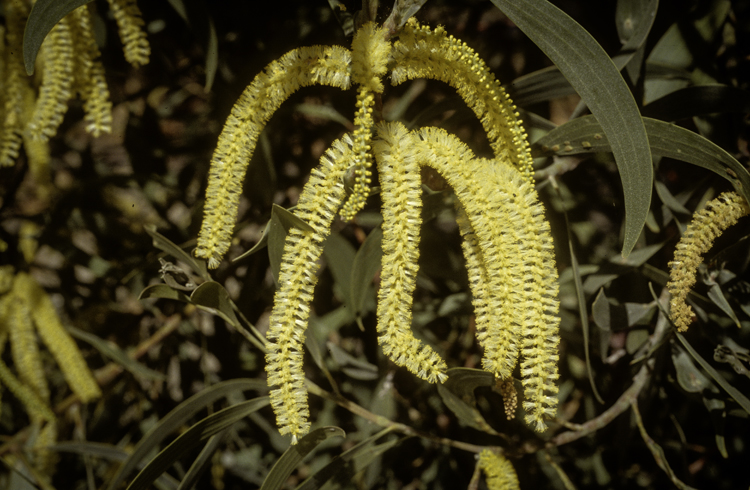
- On Bribie Island

Scientific classification
- Kingdom: Plantae
- Clade: Tracheophytes
- Clade: Angiosperms
- Clade: Eudicots
- Clade: Rosids
- Order: Fabales
- Family: Fabaceae
- Subfamily: Caesalpinioideae
- Clade: Mimosoid clade
- Genus: Acacia
- Species: A. concurrens

Binomial name
- Acacia concurrens Pedley
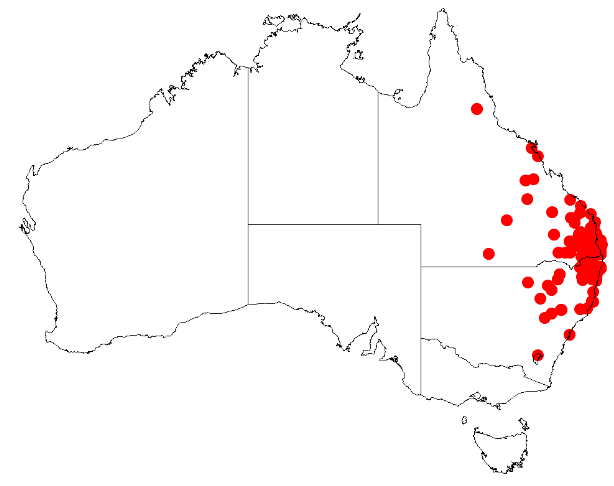
- Occurrence data from AVH

Synonyms
- Acacia cunninghamii Hook. nom. illeg.; Racosperma concurrens (Pedley) Pedley

= Acacia concurrens =

Curracabah

Species of legume

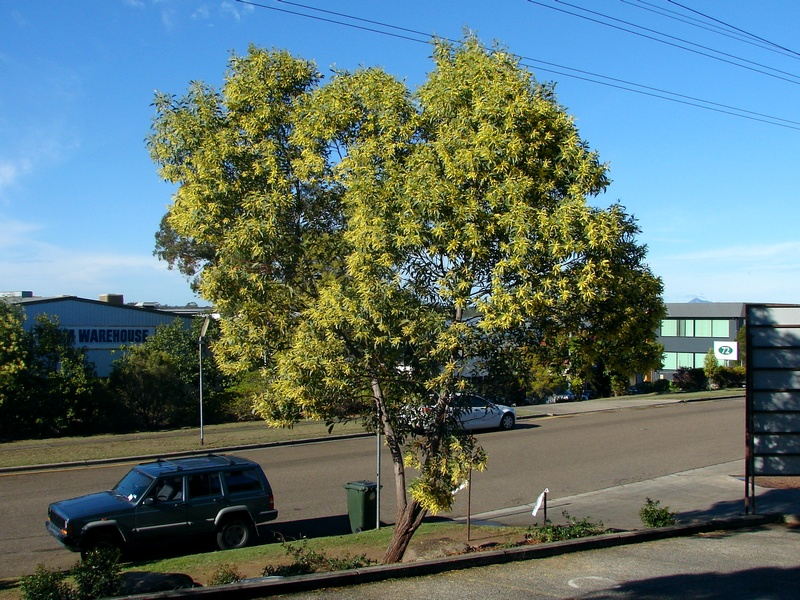
Habit

Acacia concurrens, commonly known as curracabah or black wattle, is a species of flowering plant in the family Fabaceae and is endemic to eastern Australia. It is a single-stemmed glabrous shrub or tree, with fissured bark, scurfy branchlets, very narrowly elliptic to narrowly elliptic, leathery phyllodes, spikes of pale yellow flowers and linear, semicircular, pods.

== Description ==
Acacia concurrens is a single-stemmed, glabous, glaucous shrub or tree that typically grows to a height of up to 10 m (33 ft), its bark grey-black, fibrous and longitudinally fissured. Its branches are angular, stout, brown and scurfy. The phyllodes are very narrowly elliptic to narrowly elliptic, the upper margin curved and the lower margin straight, 80–160 mm (3.1–6.3 in) long and 12–35 mm (0.47–1.38 in) wide with mostly 3 to 4 more prominent veins, and a gland up to 2 mm (0.079 in) above the base of the phyllode. The flowers are borne in pale yellow spikes 35–110 mm (1.4–4.3 in) long. Flowering occurs between March and September, and the pods are linear, semicircular, appearing somewhat like a string of beads, 50–100 mm (2.0–3.9 in) long. The seeds are elliptic, 3.5–4.5 mm (0.14–0.18 in) long and brownish black.

== Taxonomy ==
Acacia concurrens was first formally described in 1974 by the botanist Leslie Pedley in Contributions from the Queensland Herbarium from specimens collected by Allan Cunningham near the Brisbane River. The specific epithet (concurrens) means 'running together', referring to the lowermost longitudinal veins of the phyllodes, running into each other and the margin near the base.

== Distribution ==
Curracabah is endemic to an area from south eastern Queensland to northern New South Wales in the south where it is common in coastal areas from around the Mooloolah River in Queensland down to the Hastings River in New South Wales. It grows on hillsides or plateaux in sandy or stony sandy loams, often over shale, as part of the understorey in Eucalyptus forest or woodland.

== See also ==
- List of Acacia species
