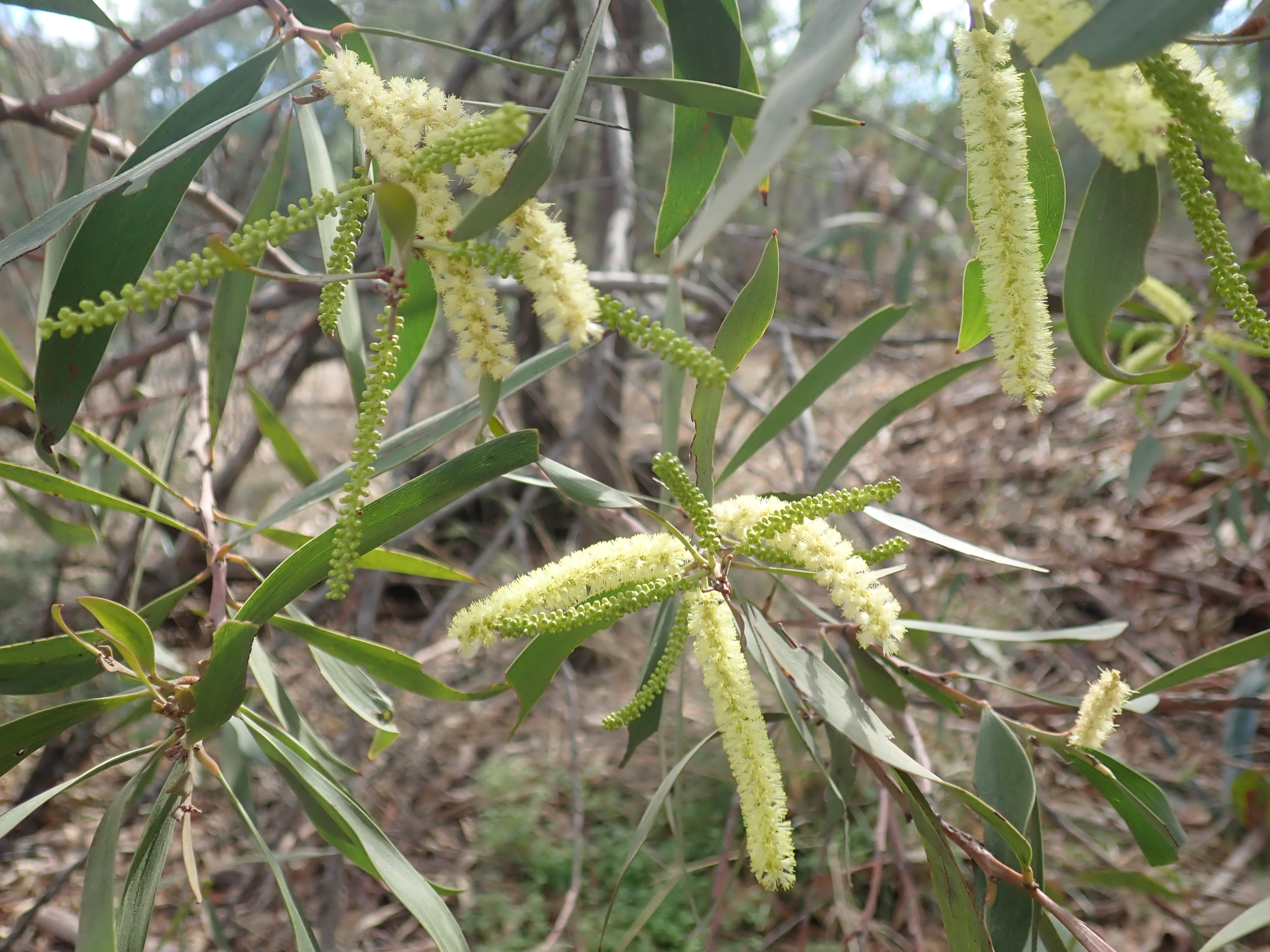
- Near Narrabri

Scientific classification
- Kingdom: Plantae
- Clade: Embryophytes
- Clade: Tracheophytes
- Clade: Spermatophytes
- Clade: Angiosperms
- Clade: Eudicots
- Clade: Rosids
- Order: Fabales
- Family: Fabaceae
- Subfamily: Caesalpinioideae
- Clade: Mimosoid clade
- Genus: Acacia
- Species: A. leiocalyx

Binomial name
- Acacia leiocalyx (Domin) Pedley
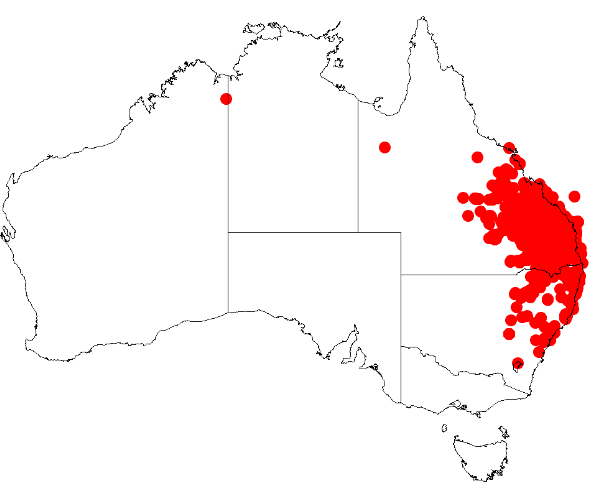
- Occurrence data from AVH

Synonyms
- Acacia glaucescens var. leiocalyx Domin; Racosperma leiocalyx (Domin) Pedley

= Acacia leiocalyx =

Species of legume

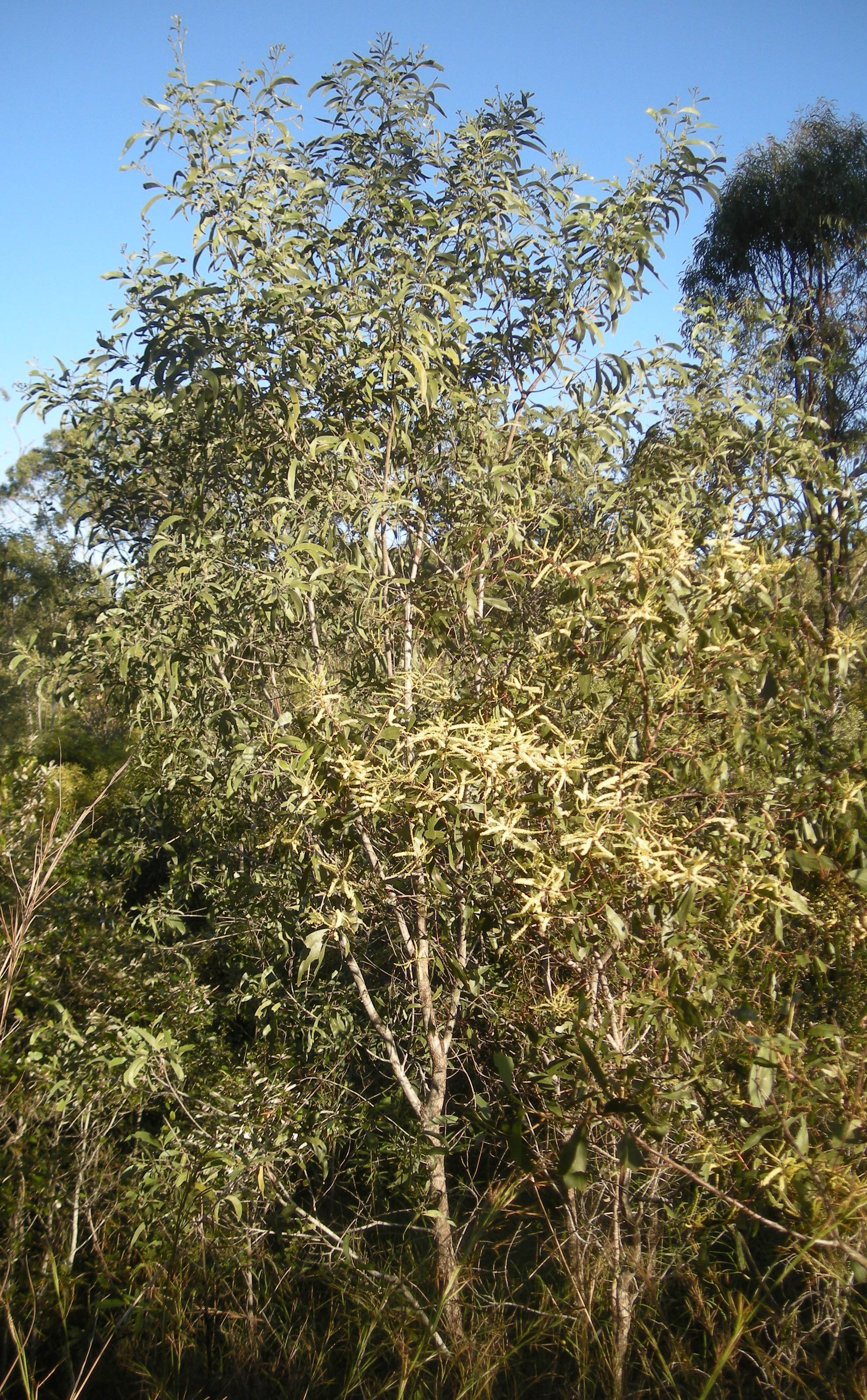
Habit

Acacia leiocalyx, commonly known as blackwattle, early black wattle, early flowering black wattle, lamb's tail wattle or curracabah is a species of flowering plant in the family Fabaceae and is endemic to eastern Australia. It is a shrub or tree with fissured, flaky bark, very narrowly elliptic to narrowly elliptic, more or less straight to sickle-shaped phyllodes, spikes of pale yellow, sometimes lemon-yellow flowers and linear, leathery pods slightly constricted between the seeds.

== Description ==
Acacia leiocalyx is a shrub or tree that typically grows to a height of up to 6 m (20 ft) and has fissured, flaky, fibrous grey or brown bark and angular, glabrous reddish branchlets. Its phyllodes are very narrowly elliptic to narrowly elliptic, more or less straight to sickle-shaped, 70–180 mm (2.8–7.1 in) long and 7–35 mm (0.28–1.38 in) wide with three or more prominent main longitudinal veins and a gland near the pulvinus that is 2–4 mm (0.079–0.157 in) long. The flowers are pale yellow, sometimes lemon-yellow and borne in spikes 30–100 mm (1.2–3.9 in) long. Flowering time depends on subspecies, and the pods are linear, leathery, curved, coiled or twisted, 40–150 mm (1.6–5.9 in) long, 2–4 mm (0.079–0.157 in) wide and slightly constricted between the seeds. The seeds are broadly elliptic, 2.5–3.5 mm (0.098–0.138 in) long and black.

== Taxonomy ==
This species was first formally described in 1926 by Karel Domin who gave it the name Acacia glaucescens var. leiocalyx in Bibliotheca Botanica from specimens collected by Amalie Dietrich near Port Mackay. In 1974, Leslie Pedley raised the variety to species status as Acacia leiocalyx in Contributions from the Queensland Herbarium.

The specific epithet (leiocalyx) means 'smooth sepals', referring to the usually glabrous calyx.

In a later edition of Austrobaileya, Pedley described two subspecies of P. leiocalyx, and the names are accepted by the Australian Plant Census:

- Acacia leiocalyx subsp. herveyensis Pedley has phyllodes 10–25 mm (0.39–0.98 in) wide and flowers from July to September.
- Acacia leiocalyx (Domin) Pedley subsp. leiocalyx has phyllodes 7–14 mm (0.28–0.55 in) wide and flowers from mid-April to July in coastal Queensland, late April to August in inland areas, and mainly June to September in New South Wales..

== Distribution and habitat ==
- Subspecies herveyensis is restricted th south-east Queensland, where it is found from Yeppoon and south-east to Fraser Island and south to Gympie where it grow in sand beach scrub or in clay soils in forest. It occurs with subsp. leiocalyx in the Gympie-Maryborough area.
- Subspecies leiocalyx is widespread in Queensland from south of Mackay to north-eastern New South Wales, and the Sydney and Narrabri districts.

== Uses ==
The timber is colourful but splits easily even with the end grain sealed.The seeds and gum are apparently edible, but caution should be taken - especially as there are so many difficult to identify similar species.
