= Calantha =

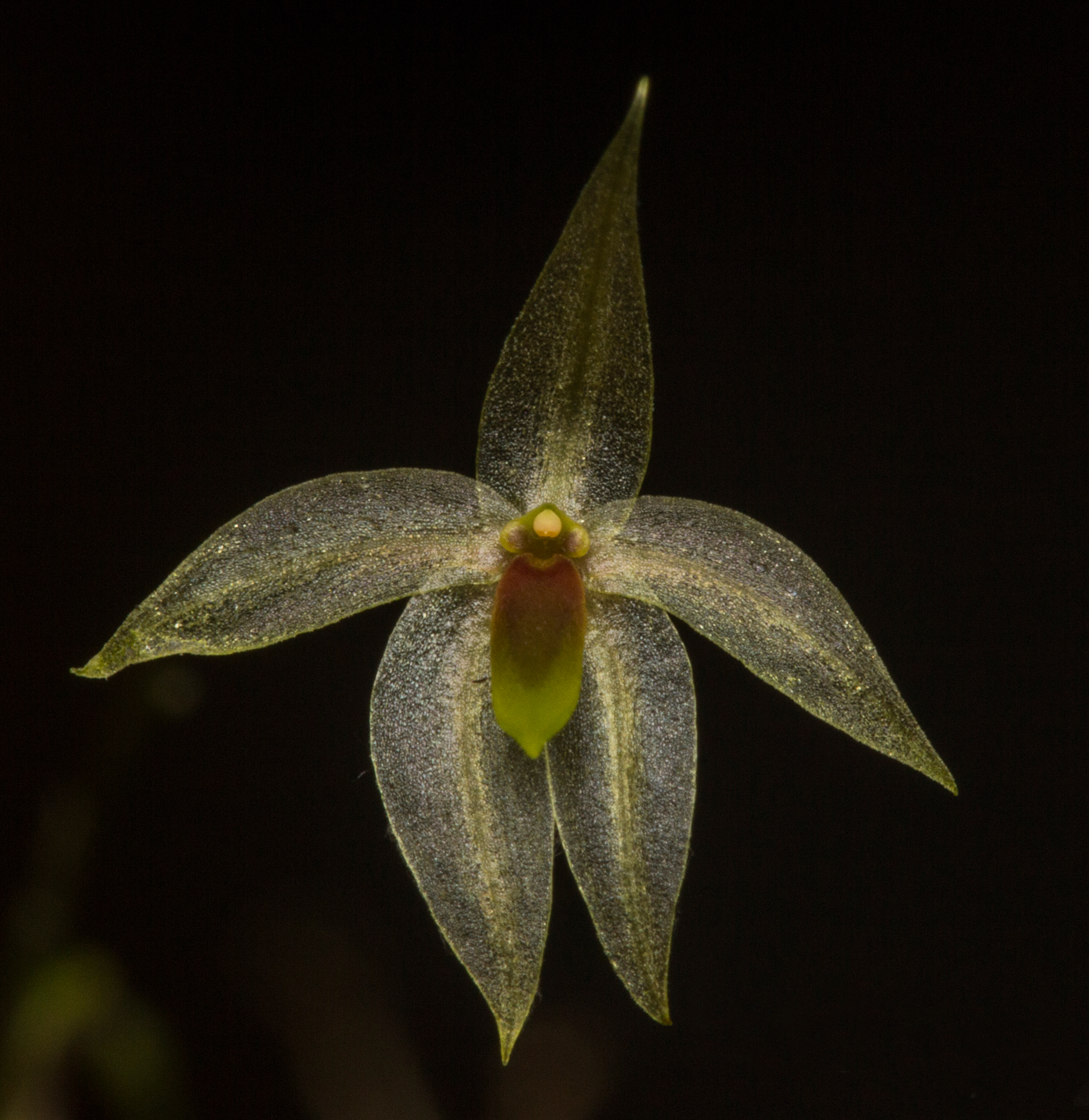
Platystele calantha

Calantha is a name derived from the Ancient Greek καλός (kalós) meaning beautiful and ἄνθος (ánthos) meaning flower. According to Wiktionary, the word can be used as an adjective as a specific epithet for plants with beautiful flowers.

Calantha may refer to:

== Fictional characters ==
- Calantha, character in the novel Glenarvon
- Calantha, character in the tragedy The Broken Heart

== Plant species ==
- Siparuna calantha
- Inga calantha
- Sorindeia calantha
- Palicourea calantha
- Qualea calantha
- Acacia calantha
- Besleria calantha
- Maxillaria calantha
- Platystele calantha
- Rosa calantha
- Chloraea calantha

== Other ==
- Calantha (insecticide), a foliar insecticide
- The Naughty Calantha, story by Aubrey Bowser

== See also ==
- Calanthe
