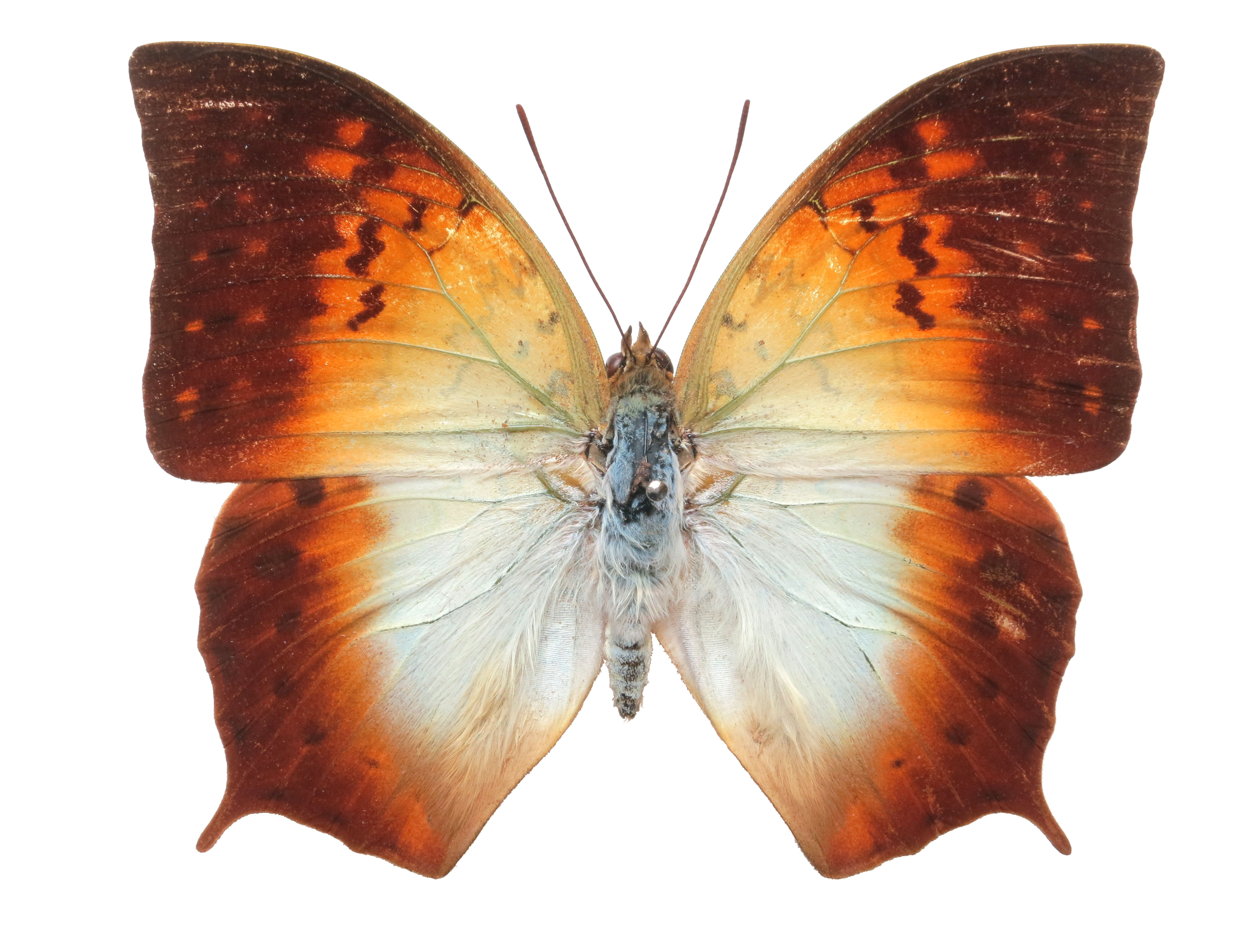

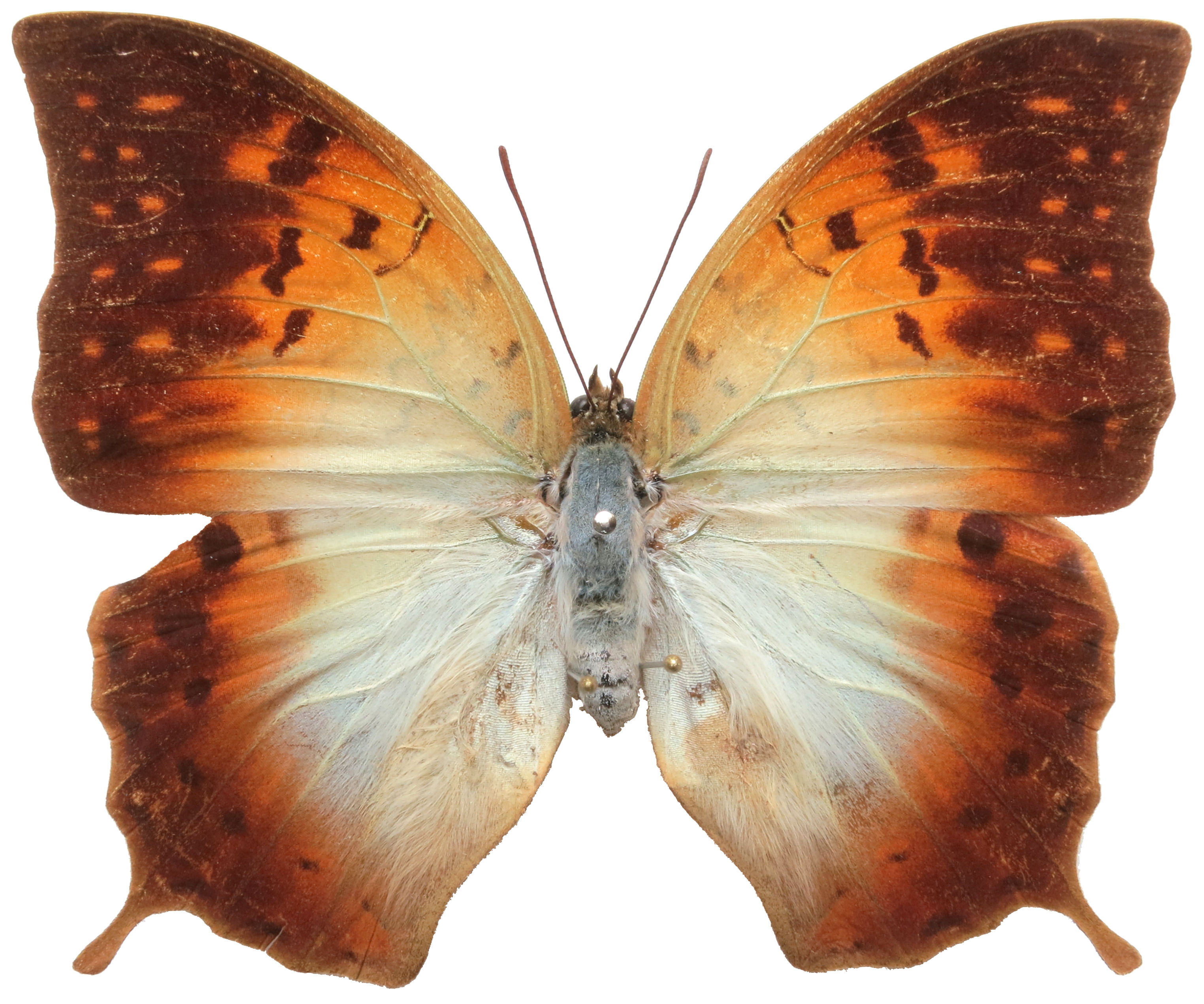
- C. acuminatus male and female - Nguru Forest, Tanzania

Scientific classification
- Kingdom: Animalia
- Phylum: Arthropoda
- Clade: Pancrustacea
- Class: Insecta
- Order: Lepidoptera
- Family: Nymphalidae
- Genus: Charaxes
- Species: C. acuminatus

Binomial name
- Charaxes acuminatus Thurau, 1903

= Charaxes acuminatus =

Pointed pearl charaxes

Species of butterfly

Charaxes acuminatus, the pointed pearl charaxes or mountain pearl charaxes, is a butterfly in the family Nymphalidae. It is found in Uganda, Rwanda, Burundi, Kenya, Tanzania, the Democratic Republic of the Congo, Malawi, Zambia and Zimbabwe.

== Description ==
Characterized, as the specific name implies, by the acuminate forewings Forewing with the distal margin deeply excised and long, sharp, falcate apex. The orange or red-brown spots in the black marginal area small or indistinct. German East Africa.

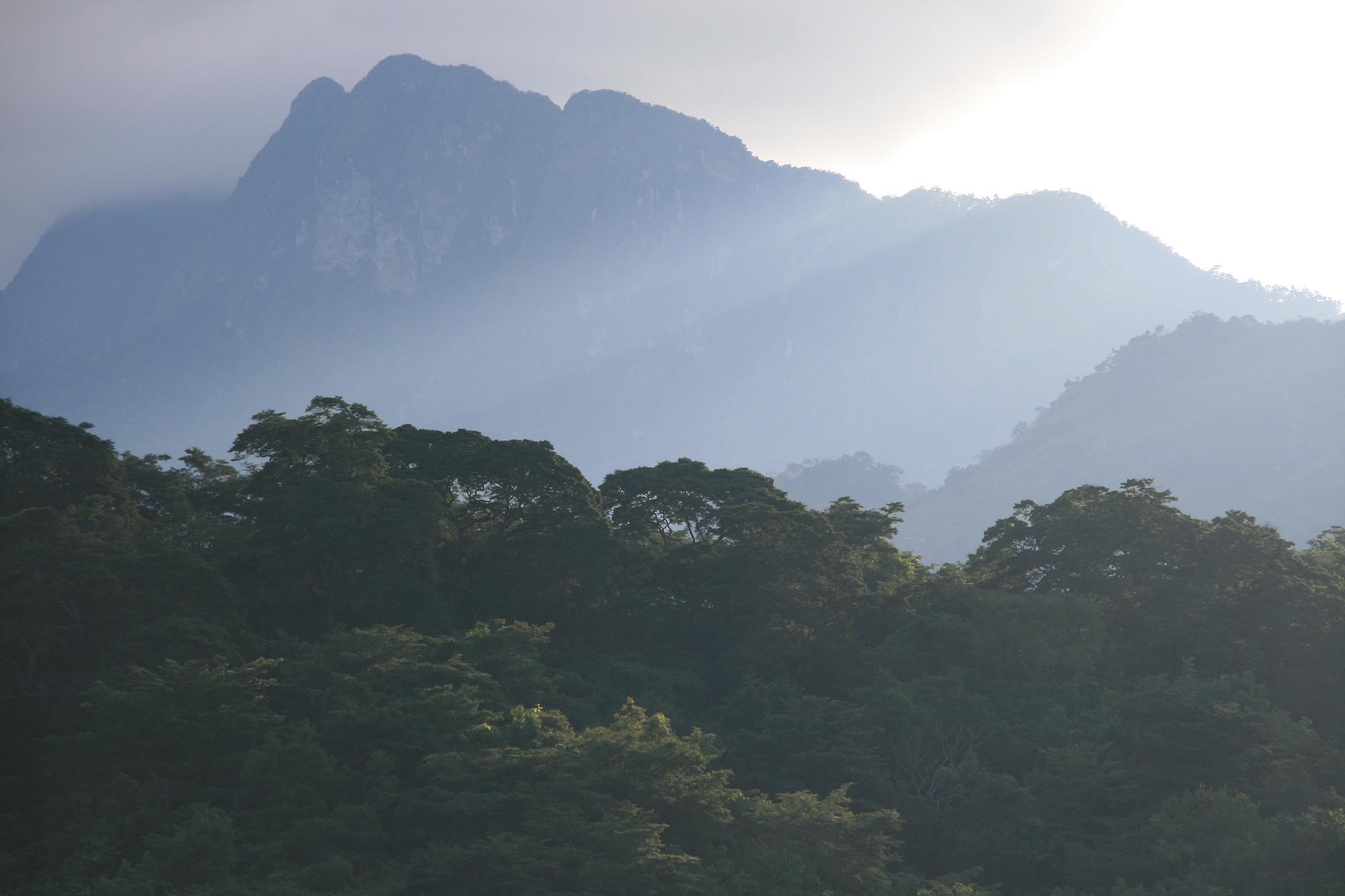
Habitat in Tanzania

== Biology ==
The habitat consists of afromontane forests usually at altitudes above 1,800 metres (5,900 ft).

Notes on the biology of acuminatus are given by Larsen, T.B. (1991) and Kielland, J. (1990).

The larvae feed on Allophylus species (including A. alnifolius, A. chirindensis, A. abyssinicus, A. chaunostachys and A. africanus) and Bersama abyssinica.

== Taxonomy ==
Charaxes varanes group. Subgenus Stonehamia (Hadrodontes) The group members are:

- Charaxes varanes
- Charaxes fulvescens very similar to varanes
- Charaxes acuminatus very pointed forewing
- Charaxes balfouri
- Charaxes analava
- Charaxes nicati
- Charaxes bertrami perhaps subspecies of varanes
- Charaxes saperanus
- Charaxes defulvata

== Subspecies ==
- C. a. acuminatus (Tanzania, northern Malawi)
- C. a. cottrelli van Someren, 1963 (north-western Zambia, Democratic Republic of Congo: from the south-east to Shaba)
- C. a. kigezia van Someren, 1963 (western Uganda, Rwanda, Burundi, Democratic Republic of Congo, north-western Tanzania)
- C. a. kulalae van Someren, 1975 (northern Kenya)
- C. a. mlanji van Someren, 1963 (southern Malawi)
- C. a. nyika van Someren, 1963 (Malawi: Nyika Plateau, north-eastern Zambia)
- C. a. oreas Talbot, 1932 (Kenya: central highlands east of the Rift Valley)
- C. a. rondonis Kielland, 1987 (south-eastern Tanzania)
- C. a. shimbanus van Someren, 1963 (south-eastern coast of Kenya)
- C. a. stonehamiana Collins & Larsen, 1991 (western Kenya)
- C. a. teitensis van Someren, 1963 (south-eastern Kenya, Tanzania: north to Mount Kilimanjaro and Mount Meru)
- C. a. thiryi Bouyer & Vingerhoedt, 2001 (Democratic Republic of Congo)
- C. a. usambarensis van Someren, 1963 (north-eastern Tanzania)
- C. a. vumba van Someren, 1963 (eastern Zimbabwe)

== See also ==
- Albertine Rift
