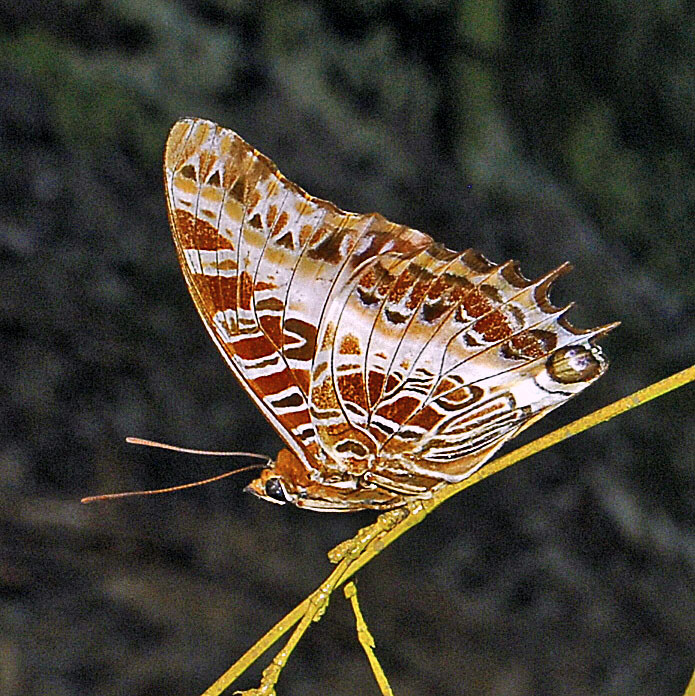
- Charaxes pollux, underwings

Scientific classification
- Kingdom: Animalia
- Phylum: Arthropoda
- Clade: Pancrustacea
- Class: Insecta
- Order: Lepidoptera
- Family: Nymphalidae
- Subfamily: Charaxinae
- Tribe: Charaxini
- Genus: Charaxes
- Species: C. pollux

Binomial name
- Charaxes pollux (Cramer, 1775)

Synonyms
- Papilio pollux Cramer, 1775; Papilio camulus Drury, 1782; Charaxes pollux ab. subalbescens Hall, 1930; Charaxes pollux bungense Stoneham, 1932; Charaxes pollux ab. ongeus Stoneham, 1932; Charaxes pollux zinjense Stoneham, 1932; Charaxes pollux mirabilis Turlin, 1989

= Charaxes pollux =

Black-bordered charaxes

Species of butterfly

Charaxes pollux, the black-bordered charaxes, is a butterfly in the family Nymphalidae.

== Distribution and habitat ==
Charaxes pollux can be found in Guinea, Sierra Leone, Liberia, Ivory Coast, Ghana, Nigeria, Cameroon, Equatorial Guinea, the Central African Republic, Gabon, Angola, the Republic of the Congo, the Democratic Republic of the Congo, Zambia, Rwanda, Burundi, Sudan, Uganda, Kenya, Tanzania, Malawi, Mozambique and Zimbabwe. The habitat consists of Afrotropical forests, gallery forests and heavy woodland.

== Description ==
In Charaxes pollux forewings can reach a length of 36–45 millimetres (1.4–1.8 in) in males, of 41–51 millimetres (1.6–2.0 in) in females. The upperside of the forewings is tawny in the basal area, with a broad ochraceous orange post-discal band and a black wide border. The upperside of the hindwings is rather similar, but it has a whitish discal area and pale blue submarginal spots. The underside is red-chestnut, with a white discal band and a series of black bars bordered with white. The edge of the wings is sharply dentate. Seitz-The discal band of the upper surface is dark orange-yellow; the tails of the hind wing only 3–4 mm. in length; the hindwing above with a deep black, unspotted marginal band, 9–10 mm. in breadth; the forewing with small brown marginal spots. On the under surface the black, white-bordered spots are almost as numerous as in hansali and on the hindwing there are three in cellule 8 and two in cellule 7. Sierra Leone to Angola and Uganda. — geminus Rothsch. differs in having small brown marginal spots on the hindwing above, at least in cellules 4—6. Manicaland, Nyassaland, Kilimandjaro. Similar to Charaxes ansorgei but male lacking a white band on the hindwing upperside.

== Gallery ==
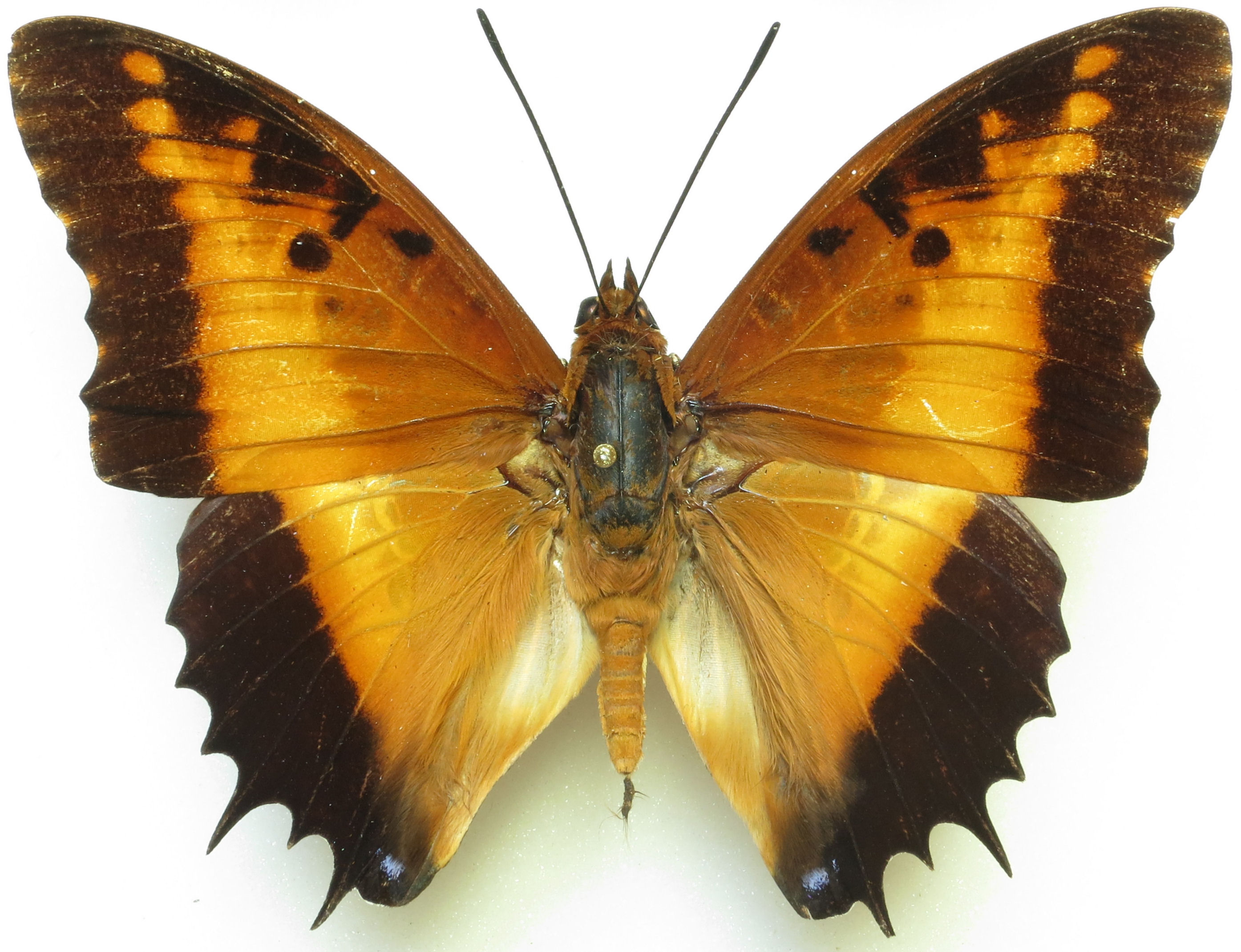
C. p. pollux from the CAR - upperside

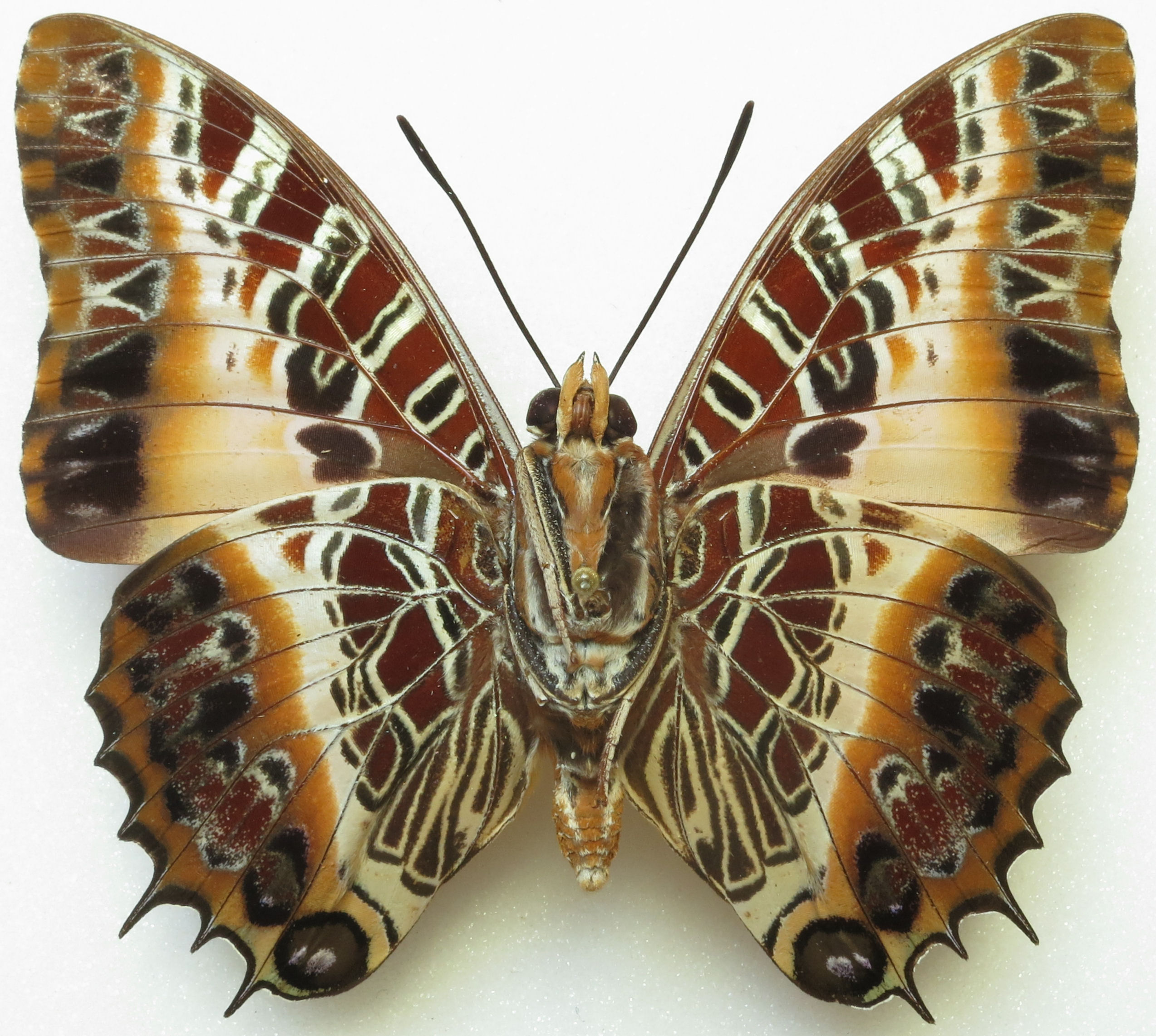
C. p. pollux from the CAR - underside

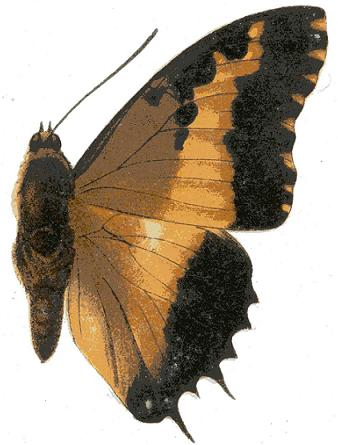
Illustration from Fauna Africana (1910)

== Subspecies ==
Subspecies include:

- C. p. pollux (Guinea, Sierra Leone, Liberia, Ivory Coast, Ghana, Nigeria, Cameroon, Central African Republic, Gabon, northern Angola, Congo, Democratic Republic of the Congo, northern and north-western Zambia, Rwanda, Burundi, southern Sudan, Uganda, western and central Kenya, western Tanzania)
- C. p. annamariae Turlin, 1998 (Bioko)
- C. p. gazanus van Someren, 1967 (Mozambique: west to area between the Zambezi and Limpopo Rivers), eastern Zimbabwe)
- C. p. geminus Rothschild, 1900 (Malawi, Zambia: east of the Luangwa Valley), southern and eastern Tanzania, south-eastern Kenya)
- C. p. maua van Someren, 1967 (northern Tanzania)
- C. p. mira Ackery, 1995 (north-eastern Tanzania)
- C. p. piersoni Collins, 1990 (Zanzibar)

Torben Larsen developed a species numbering system for his 2005 publication Butterflies of West Africa. The nominate subspecies is #738. The 'Larsen' numbers have since been used with permission in A Sharp Eye on Butterflies of Ghana.

== Natural history ==
Life-sized colour plates and description of the larval and pupal stages of C. pollux and additional related species, illustrated by Dr. V. G. L. van Someren, are readily available. The larvae feed on Sorindeia species, Bersama abyssinica, Deinbollia kilimandsharica, Deinbollia borbonica, Fluggia microcarpa, Securinega virosa and Fluggia virosa. Adults are probably on wing year round.

Notes on the biology of pollux are given by Pringle et al (1994), Larsen (1991), Larsen (2005) and Kielland (1990).

== Related species ==
Historical attempts to assemble a cluster of presumably related species into a "Charaxes jasius Group" have not been wholly convincing. More recent taxonomic revision, corroborated by phylogenetic research, allow a more rational grouping congruent with cladistic relationships. Within a well-populated clade of 27 related species sharing a common ancestor approximately 16 mya during the Miocene, 26 are now considered together as The jasius Group. One of the two lineages within this clade forms a robust monophyletic group of seven species sharing a common ancestor approximately 2-3 mya, i.e. during the Pliocene, and are considered as the jasius subgroup. The second lineage leads to 19 other species within the Jasius group, which are split into three well-populated subgroups of closely related species.

The jasius Group (26 Species):

Clade 1: jasius subgroup (7 species)

Clade 2: contains the well-populated three additional subgroups (19 species) of the jasius Group: called the brutus, pollux, and eudoxus subgroups.

- the pollux subgroup (4 species):
- Charaxes pollux
- Charaxes phoebus
- Charaxes ansorgei
- Charaxes dowsetti

Further exploration of the phylogenetic relationships amongst existing Charaxes taxa is required to improve clarity.
