= Charaxes balfourii =

Charaxes balfouri

Scientific classification
- Domain: Eukaryota
- Kingdom: Animalia
- Phylum: Arthropoda
- Class: Insecta
- Order: Lepidoptera
- Family: Nymphalidae
- Genus: Charaxes
- Species: C. balfouri

Binomial name
- Charaxes balfouri Butler, 1881

Species of butterfly

Charaxes balfouri is a butterfly in the family Nymphalidae. It is found on Socotra. The habitat consists of forests at altitudes between 500 and 1,000 metres (1,600 and 3,300 ft).

== Description ==
A full description is given by Rothschild, W and Jordan, K. (1900). Novitates Zoologicae 7:287-524. page 361-362 (for terms see Novitates Zoologicae Volume 5:545-601 )

== Taxonomy ==
Charaxes varanes group. Subgenus Stonehamia (Hadrodontes)

The group members are

- Charaxes varanes
- Charaxes fulvescens very similar to varanes
- Charaxes acuminatus very pointed forewing
- Charaxes balfouri
- Charaxes analava
- Charaxes nicati
- Charaxes bertrami perhaps subspecies of varanes
- Charaxes saperanus
- Charaxes defulvata

== Etymology ==
The name honours the collector Isaac Bayley Balfour.
