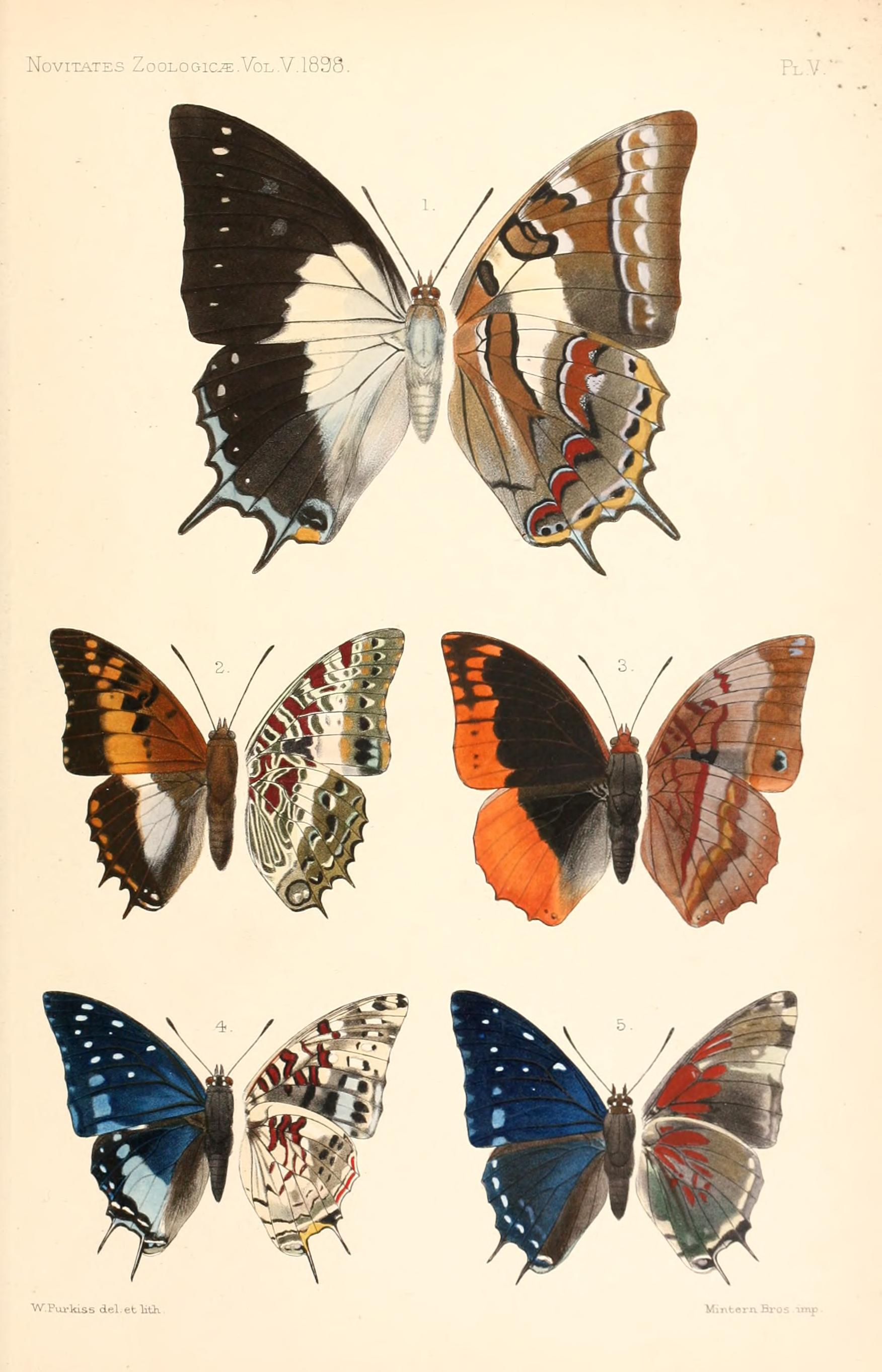
- Male, Fig. 2 (middle, left)

Scientific classification
- Domain: Eukaryota
- Kingdom: Animalia
- Phylum: Arthropoda
- Class: Insecta
- Order: Lepidoptera
- Family: Nymphalidae
- Genus: Charaxes
- Species: C. ansorgei

Binomial name
- Charaxes ansorgei Rothschild, 1897

= Charaxes ansorgei =

Species of butterfly

Charaxes ansorgei is a butterfly in the family Nymphalidae. It is found in Sudan, the Democratic Republic of Congo, Uganda, Rwanda, Burundi, Kenya, Tanzania, Malawi and Zambia. The habitat consists of montane forest on altitudes between 2,000 and 3,000 meters. The larvae feed on Bersama abyssinica abyssinica, Bersama abyssinica englerana and Bersama paullinoides.It was once considered to be a very rare species but it is relatively common in dense and inaccessible montane forests

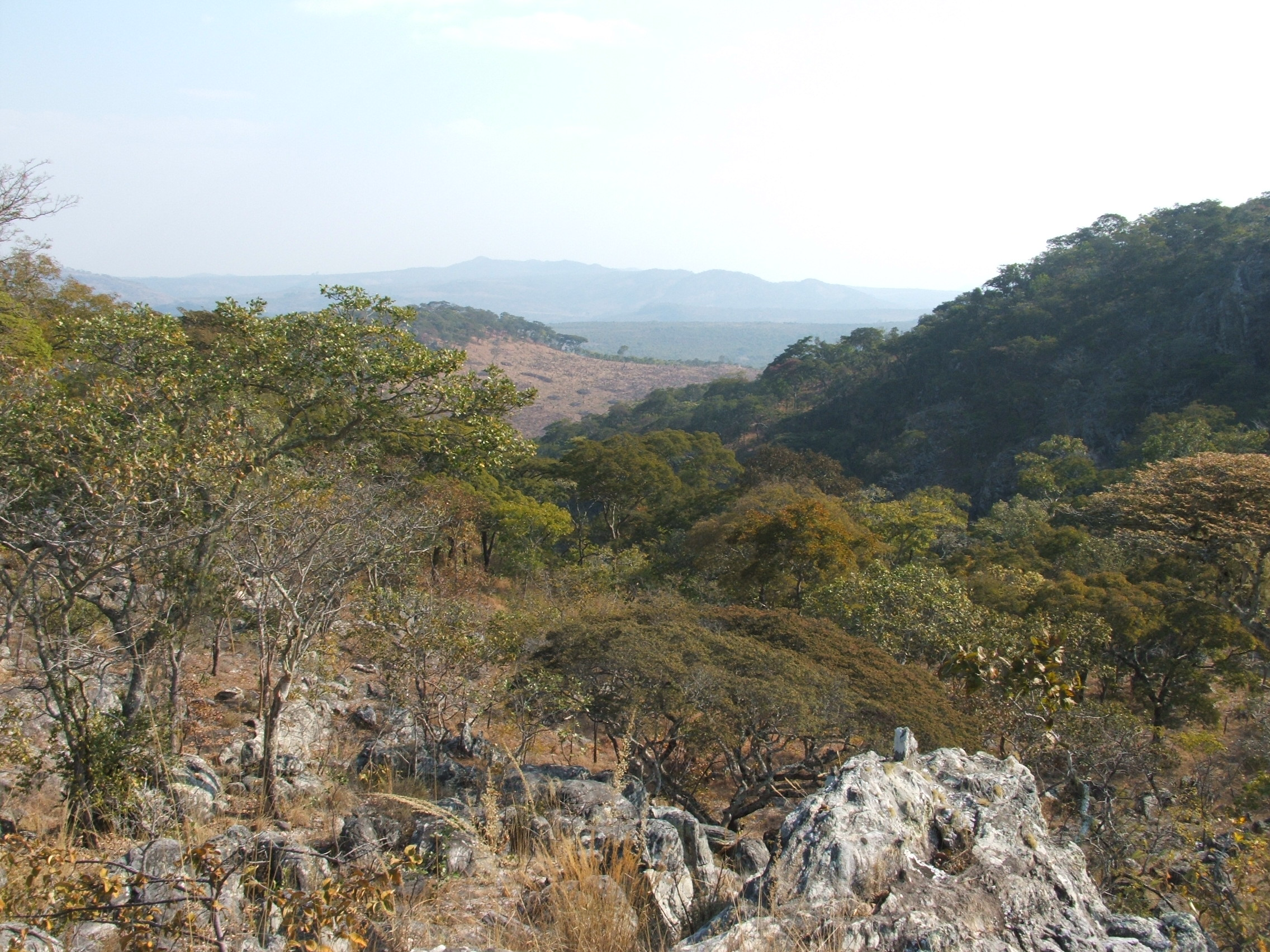
Montane forest in Zambia

== Description ==
Nearly allied to the preceding species Charaxes brutus, but has the basal part of the forewing above chestnut-brown, not black; the discal band of the hindwing is bluish white. Male- discal band of the fore wing ochre-yellow, continuous to vein 4, then broken up into spots, one each in cellules 4 and 7 and two each in 5 and 6; on the proximal side of the discal band the ground-colour forms black spots in cellules 2—6; small light marginal dots; hindwing with orange-yellow submarginal spots in cellules 2—7 and 2 blue spots in 1 c; the tail at vein 4 somewhat shorter than that at vein 2. The female is larger than the male and has the median band on the forewing white, only at the costal margin somewhat yellowish; the tails of the hindwing are longer than in the male and the anterior longer than the posterior. A full description is given by Rothschild, W. And Jordan, K., 1900 Novitates Zoologicae Volume 7:287-524. page 428-429 (for terms see Novitates Zoologicae Volume 5:545-601 )

== Subspecies ==
- C. a. ansorgei (Uganda: slopes of Mount Elgon, Kenya: highlands west of the Rift Valley)
- C. a. jacksoni Poulton, 1933 (Kenya: highlands east of the Rift Valley)
- C. a. kilimanjarica van Someren, 1967 (Tanzania: Kilimanjaro)
- C. a. kinyeti Plantrou, 1989 (Sudan (south to Imatong, Kinyeti and Didinga Mountains)
- C. a. kungwensis van Someren, 1967 (Tanzania: eastern shores of Lake Tanganyika)
- C. a. levicki Poulton, 1933 (southern highlands of Tanzania, Malawi, Zambia)
- C. a. loita Plantrou, 1982 (southern Kenya, northern Tanzania)
- C. a. ruandana Talbot, 1932 (south-western Uganda, Rwanda, Burundi, Democratic Republic of Congo)
- C. a. rydoni van Someren, 1967 (north-eastern Tanzania)
- C. a. simoni Turlin, 1987 (north-eastern Tanzania)
- C. a. ufipa Kielland, 1978 (western Tanzania)

== Related species ==
Historical attempts to assemble a cluster of presumably related species into a "Charaxes jasius Group" have not been wholly convincing. More recent taxonomic revision, corroborated by phylogenetic research, allow a more rational grouping congruent with cladistic relationships. Within a well-populated clade of 27 related species sharing a common ancestor approximately 16 mya during the Miocene, 26 are now considered together as The jasius Group. One of the two lineages within this clade forms a robust monophyletic group of seven species sharing a common ancestor approximately 2-3 mya, i.e. during the Pliocene, and are considered as the jasius subgroup. The second lineage leads to 19 other species within the Jasius group, which are split into three well-populated subgroups of closely related species.

The jasius Group (26 Species):

Clade 1: jasius subgroup (7 species)

Clade 2: contains the well-populated three additional subgroups (19 species) of the jasius Group: called the brutus, pollux, and eudoxus subgroups.

- the pollux subgroup (4 species):
- Charaxes pollux
- Charaxes phoebus
- Charaxes ansorgei
- Charaxes dowsetti

Further exploration of the phylogenetic relationships amongst existing Charaxes taxa is required to improve clarity.

== See also ==
- Aberdare Range, Kenya
- Albertine Rift
- Mount Elgon
