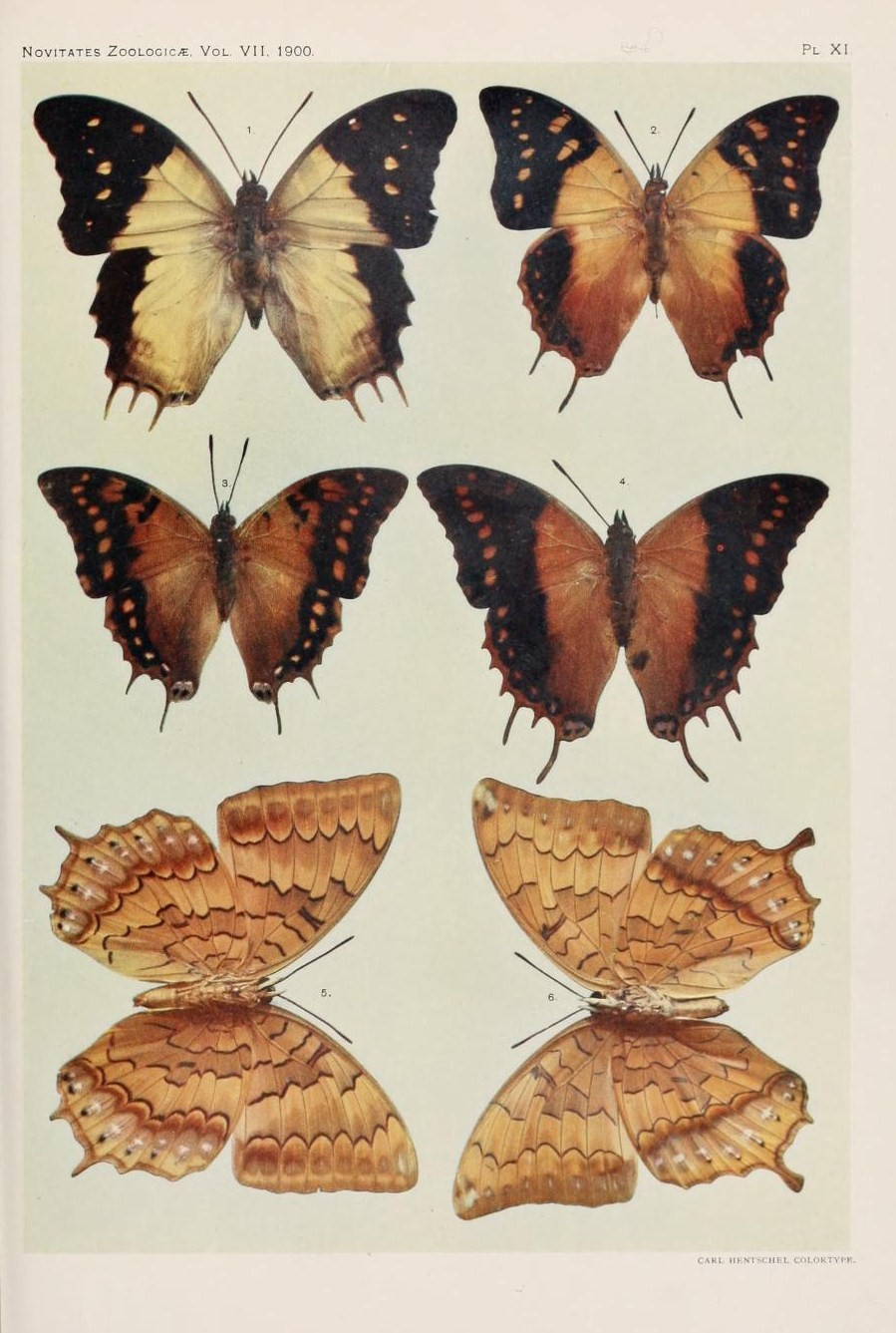
- Figure 1

Scientific classification
- Kingdom: Animalia
- Phylum: Arthropoda
- Class: Insecta
- Order: Lepidoptera
- Family: Nymphalidae
- Genus: Charaxes
- Species: C. analava

Binomial name
- Charaxes analava Ward, 1872 .

= Charaxes analava =

Species of butterfly

Charaxes analava is a butterfly in the family Nymphalidae. It is found on Madagascar. The habitat consists of Afrotropical forests.

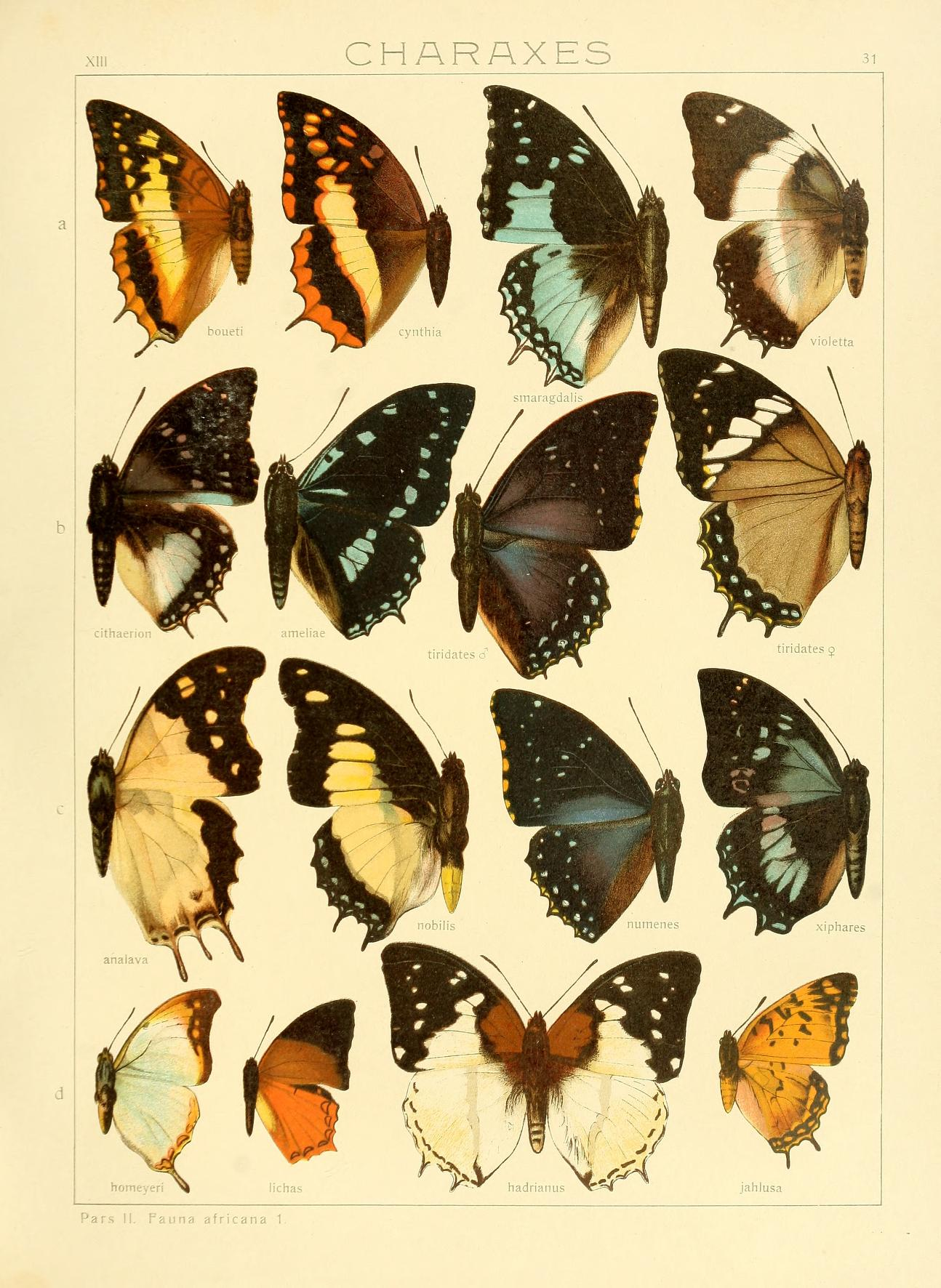
Charaxes analava figured in Seitz Fauna Africana

== Description ==
Ch. analava Ward . The marginal band of the hindwing is unicolorous black without spots and only reaches vein 4. The hindwing beneath behind the middle with a row of large eye-spots, of which the one in cellule 7 is especially large and distinct. Hindwing with 3 long tails, that at vein 3 somewhat shorter. Ground-colour of both wings light yellow. Madagascar. A full description is also given by Rothschild, W and Jordan, K. (1900). Novitates Zoologicae Volume 7:287-524. page 362-364 (for terms see Novitates Zoologicae Volume 5:545-601 )

== Taxonomy ==
Charaxes varanes group. Subgenus Stonehamia (Hadrodontes)

The group members are

- Charaxes varanes
- Charaxes fulvescens very similar to varanes
- Charaxes acuminatus very pointed forewing
- Charaxes balfouri
- Charaxes analava
- Charaxes nicati
- Charaxes bertrami perhaps subspecies of varanes
- Charaxes saperanus
- Charaxes defulvata
