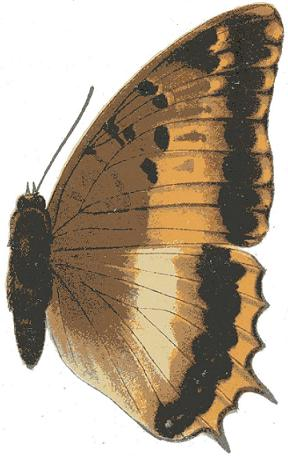

Conservation status
- Least Concern (IUCN 3.1)

Scientific classification
- Kingdom: Animalia
- Phylum: Arthropoda
- Class: Insecta
- Order: Lepidoptera
- Family: Nymphalidae
- Subfamily: Charaxinae
- Tribe: Charaxini
- Genus: Charaxes
- Species: C. phoebus

Binomial name
- Charaxes phoebus Butler, 1866

= Charaxes phoebus =

Species of butterfly

Charaxes phoebus is a butterfly in the family Nymphalidae. It is found in Ethiopia. The habitat consists of montane forests and woodland.

The larvae feed on Bersama abyssinica.

== Description ==
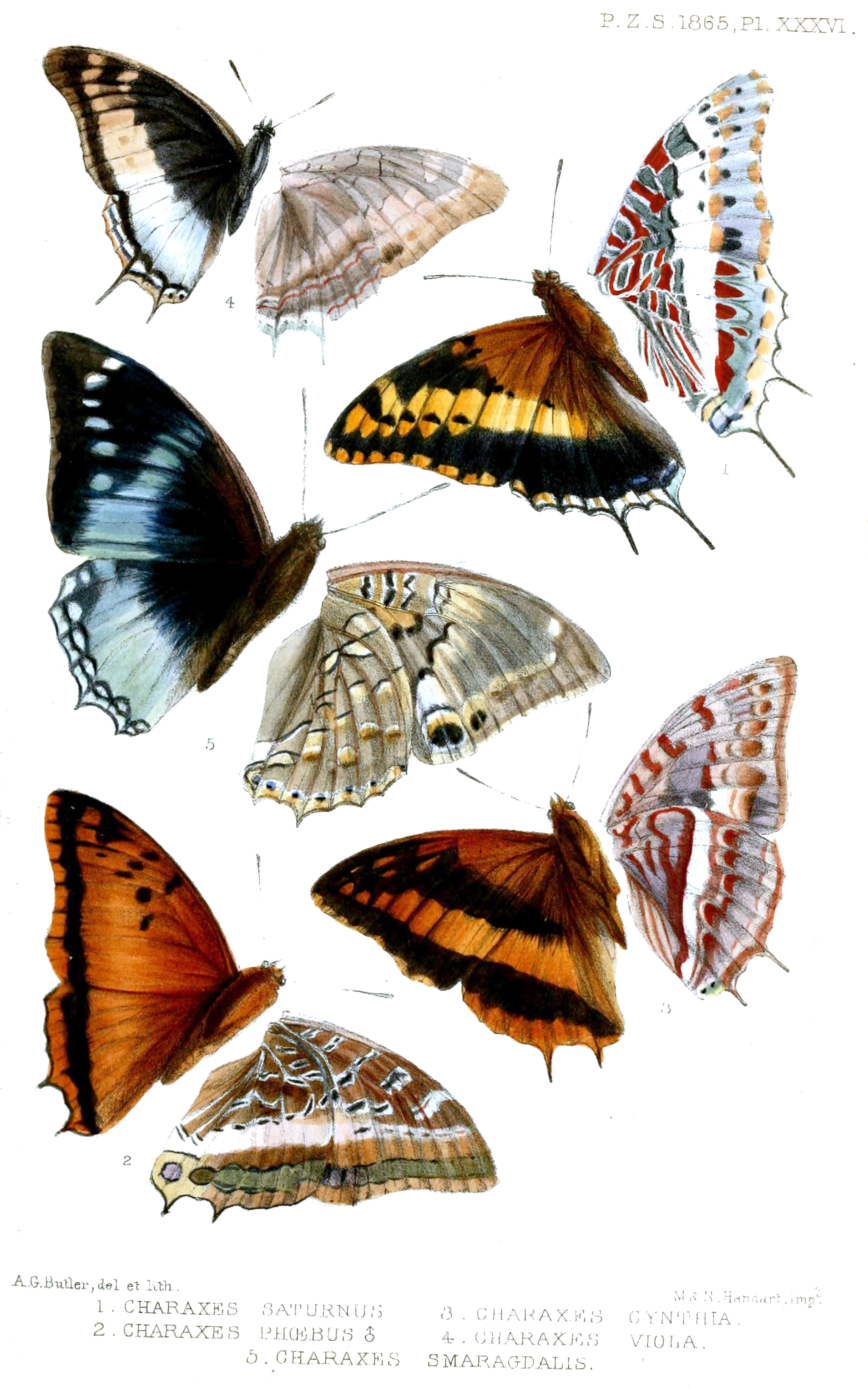
Illustrated at bottom left, in Arthur Gardiner Butler's monograph

=== Upperside ===
Front wings ferruginous, paler just beyond the middle, with a broad submarginal black band along the outer margin; apical part of submarginal edge intersected with black at the nervures; a triangular black spot, its base resting upon the first subcostal nervule near the apex; a black elongate spot closing the cell; two spots, one above the cell, the other halfway between the subapical spot and the end of the cell; two black spots placed obliquely just below the end of the cell. Hindwings as above, but without any spots, and with black marginal edge. Body ferruginous.

=== Underside ===
Reddish olivaceous, basal half curiously marked with silvery spots and streaks with dark centres; central band silvery, very narrow, tapering from the inner margin of hindwing near the anal angle to the front margin of anterior wing near the apex. Front wings with a submarginal row of eight dusky black spots between the nervules along the outer margin; a row of six dusky spots on the central band. Hindwings with a submarginal olivaceous band varied with silver; anal angle ochreous, enclosing a violaceous spot.

Hab. Abyssinia. B.M.

== Related species ==
Historical attempts to assemble a cluster of presumably related species into a "Charaxes jasius Group" have not been wholly convincing. More recent taxonomic revision, corroborated by phylogenetic research, allow a more rational grouping congruent with cladistic relationships. Within a well-populated clade of 27 related species sharing a common ancestor approximately 16 mya during the Miocene, 26 are now considered together as The jasius Group. One of the two lineages within this clade forms a robust monophyletic group of seven species sharing a common ancestor approximately 2-3 mya, i.e. during the Pliocene, and are considered as the jasius subgroup. The second lineage leads to 19 other species within the Jasius group, which are split into three well-populated subgroups of closely related species.

The jasius Group (26 Species):

Clade 1: jasius subgroup (7 species)

Clade 2: contains the well-populated three additional subgroups (19 species) of the jasius Group: called the brutus, pollux, and eudoxus subgroups.

- the pollux subgroup (4 species):
- Charaxes pollux
- Charaxes phoebus
- Charaxes ansorgei
- Charaxes dowsetti

Further exploration of the phylogenetic relationships amongst existing Charaxes taxa is required to improve clarity.
