= Charaxes saperanus =

Scientific classification
- Domain: Eukaryota
- Kingdom: Animalia
- Phylum: Arthropoda
- Class: Insecta
- Order: Lepidoptera
- Family: Nymphalidae
- Subfamily: Charaxinae
- Tribe: Charaxini
- Genus: Charaxes
- Species: C. saperanus

Binomial name
- Charaxes saperanus Poulton, 1926

Synonyms
- Charaxes varanes var. comoranus Aurivillius, 1909

Species of butterfly

Charaxes saperanus is a butterfly in the family Nymphalidae. It is found on Mayotte, an island in the Indian Ocean off the coast of southeast Africa. The habitat consists of dry forests and patches of vegetation between plantations.

The larvae feed on Allophylus species.

== Taxonomy ==
Charaxes varanes group.
Subgenus Stonehamia (Hadrodontes)

The group members are:

- Charaxes varanes
- Charaxes fulvescens - very similar to varanes
- Charaxes acuminatus - very pointed forewing
- Charaxes balfouri
- Charaxes analava
- Charaxes nicati
- Charaxes bertrami - perhaps subspecies of varanes
- Charaxes saperanus
- Charaxes defulvata
