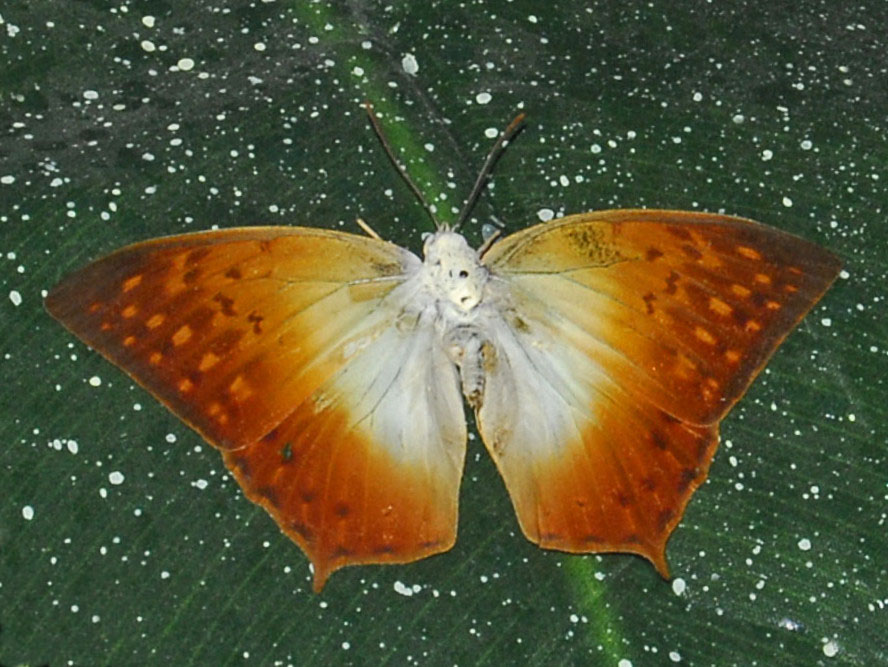
- Charaxes fulvescens, upperside

Scientific classification
- Kingdom: Animalia
- Phylum: Arthropoda
- Clade: Pancrustacea
- Class: Insecta
- Order: Lepidoptera
- Family: Nymphalidae
- Genus: Charaxes
- Species: C. fulvescens

Binomial name
- Charaxes fulvescens (Aurivillius, 1891)

Synonyms
- Palla varanes var. fulvescens Aurivillius, 1891; Charaxes fulvescens ab. ocellatus Schultze, 1917; Charaxes fulvescens stonehami Jeffery, 1931; Charaxes fulvescens maesseni Plantrou, 1989

= Charaxes fulvescens =

Forest pearl charaxes

Species of butterfly

Charaxes fulvescens, the forest pearl charaxes, is a butterfly in the family Nymphalidae.

== Taxonomy ==
Charaxes varanes group. Subgenus Stonehamia (Hadrodontes) The group members are:

- Charaxes varanes
- Charaxes fulvescens very similar to varanes
- Charaxes acuminatus very pointed forewing
- Charaxes balfouri
- Charaxes analava
- Charaxes nicati
- Charaxes bertrami perhaps subspecies of varanes
- Charaxes saperanus
- Charaxes defulvata

== Subspecies ==
Subspecies include:

- Charaxes fulvescens fulvescens (eastern Nigeria, Cameroon, Gabon, Congo, Central African Republic, Democratic Republic of the Congo)
- Charaxes fulvescens imenti Plantrou, 1989. (central Kenya)
- Charaxes fulvescens marialuisae Canu, 1989(Bioko)
- Charaxes fulvescens monitor Rothschild, 1900 (Central African Republic, southern Sudan, eastern Democratic Republic of the Congo, Uganda, Rwanda, Burundi, western Kenya, north-western Tanzania, north-western Zambia)
- Charaxes fulvescens senegala van Someren, 1975 (Senegal, Guinea-Bissau, Guinea, Sierra Leone, Liberia, Ivory Coast, Ghana, Togo, Benin, western Nigeria)

Torben Larsen developed a species numbering system for his 2005 publication Butterflies of West Africa. The subspecies senegala is #726. The 'Larsen' numbers have since been used with permission in A Sharp Eye on Butterflies of Ghana.

== Distribution ==
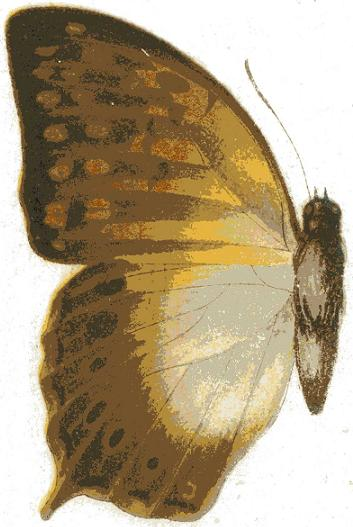
Illustration from Fauna Africana (1910)

This species is found in Senegal, Guinea-Bissau, Guinea, Sierra Leone, Liberia, Ivory Coast, Ghana, Togo, Benin, Nigeria, Cameroon, Equatorial Guinea, Gabon, the Republic of the Congo, the Central African Republic, the Democratic Republic of the Congo, Sudan, Uganda, Rwanda, Burundi, Kenya, Tanzania and Zambia.

== Habitat ==
These butterflies usually occur in dense evergreen forests at low to moderate altitudes. Occasionally inhabits savanna. In Tanzania it is found at altitudes of 800 to 2,000 metres (2,600 to 6,600 ft)

== Description ==
Charaxes fulvescens can reach a wingspan of about 46 millimetres (1.8 in). The inner half of the wings is white. Outside the white area of the upperside, the wings are orange to brown, with a pattern of lighter and darker flecks. The underside of the wings mimics a dead leaf. A sepia brown straight line divides the under wing in two areas. The inner area is light beige with several curved, interrupted, grey brown wavy lines. The outer area of the underside of the hindwing has a large eyespot and shows a well developed outer spur. Males and females are similar.

== Description in Seitz ==
Ch. fulvescens. Distal margin of the forewing in the first three races nearly straight. Forewing above in the basal part light yellow. Hindwing not angled at vein 2. Upper surface of both wings darker in the marginal part than in varanes.- fulvescens Auriv. Both wings beneath light straw-yellow at the base. Sierra Leone to Gaboon. monitor Rothsch. Wings beneath yellow-grey or olive-coloured at the base. Congo to Uganda and German East Africa. - comoranus Auriv.[= Charaxes fulvescens ssp. saperanus Poulton, 1926 = Charaxes saperanus]. Basal area of both wings above uniform light orange- yellow without white; the inner spots in the black distal part of the forewing above much produced transversely; the dark marginal band on the upperside of the hindwing much narrower than in the other races. Comoros: Mayotte. - acuminatus Thurau. [Now species] Forewing with the distal margin deeply excised and long, sharp, falcate apex; the orange or red-brown spots in the black marginal area small or indistinct. German East Africa.

== Biology ==
The larvae feed on Allophylus species, including A. macrobothrys, A. africanus, A. macrostachys and A. subcoriaceus. Notes on the biology of fulvescens are provided by Larsen, T.B. (1991) and (2005)
