= Charaxes nicati =

Scientific classification
- Kingdom: Animalia
- Phylum: Arthropoda
- Class: Insecta
- Order: Lepidoptera
- Family: Nymphalidae
- Genus: Charaxes
- Species: C. nicati

Binomial name
- Charaxes nicati Canu, 1991

Species of butterfly

Charaxes nicati is a butterfly in the family Nymphalidae. It is found on the Comoros.

== Taxonomy ==
Charaxes varanes group. Subgenus Stonehamia (Hadrodontes).

The group members are:

- Charaxes varanes
- Charaxes fulvescens very similar to varanes
- Charaxes acuminatus very pointed forewing
- Charaxes balfouri
- Charaxes analava
- Charaxes nicati
- Charaxes bertrami perhaps subspecies of varanes
- Charaxes saperanus
- Charaxes defulvata
