= Sorindeia africana =

Scientific classification
- Kingdom: Plantae
- Clade: Tracheophytes
- Clade: Angiosperms
- Clade: Eudicots
- Clade: Rosids
- Order: Sapindales
- Family: Anacardiaceae
- Genus: Sorindeia
- Species: S. africana

Binomial name
- Sorindeia africana (Engl.) Van der Veken

Species of plant

Sorindeia africana is a medium-sized tree within the family Anacardiaceae. It is a variable species with more than ten heterotypic synonyms.

== Description ==
The species commonly grows as a tree but it has been observed growing as a shrub, it can reach a height of 33 m (108 ft) and a diameter of up to 40 cm (16 in). Branches are sometimes free of hair but when hairy, it has a distinctive brown indumentum. Leaves are papery to leathery, leaflets can reach 20 cm (7.9 in) in length and 6 cm (2.4 in) in width, they are rounded to cuneate at base and acuminate at the apex. Inflorescence are in axillary or terminal panicles. Fruit is yellowish to orange when ripe.

== Distribution ==
Sorindeia africana occurs largely in west-central tropical Africa (Cameroon, the Central African Republic, the Republic of the Congo and Gabon) and has also been observed in Angola, Nigeria and Zambia.
