= Charaxes dowsetti =

Scientific classification
- Domain: Eukaryota
- Kingdom: Animalia
- Phylum: Arthropoda
- Class: Insecta
- Order: Lepidoptera
- Family: Nymphalidae
- Genus: Charaxes
- Species: C. dowsetti

Binomial name
- Charaxes dowsetti Henning, 1989

Species of butterfly

Charaxes dowsetti is a butterfly in the family Nymphalidae. It is found on the Nyika Plateau in Malawi. The habitat consists of montane forests at altitudes above 2,200 meters.

The larvae feed on Agarista salicifolia.

== Related species ==
Historical attempts to assemble a cluster of presumably related species into a "Charaxes jasius Group" have not been wholly convincing. More recent taxonomic revision, corroborated by phylogenetic research, allow a more rational grouping congruent with cladistic relationships. Within a well-populated clade of 27 related species sharing a common ancestor approximately 16 mya during the Miocene, 26 are now considered together as The jasius Group. One of the two lineages within this clade forms a robust monophyletic group of seven species sharing a common ancestor approximately 2-3 mya, i.e. during the Pliocene, and are considered as the jasius subgroup. The second lineage leads to 19 other species within the Jasius group, which are split into three well-populated subgroups of closely related species.

The jasius Group (26 Species):

Clade 1: jasius subgroup (7 species)

Clade 2: contains the well-populated three additional subgroups (19 species) of the jasius Group: called the brutus, pollux, and eudoxus subgroups.

- the pollux subgroup (4 species):
- Charaxes pollux
- Charaxes phoebus
- Charaxes ansorgei
- Charaxes dowsetti

Further exploration of the phylogenetic relationships amongst existing Charaxes taxa is required to improve clarity.
