= Sorindeia juglandifolia =

Conservation status
- Least Concern (IUCN 3.1)

Scientific classification
- Kingdom: Plantae
- Clade: Tracheophytes
- Clade: Angiosperms
- Clade: Eudicots
- Clade: Rosids
- Order: Sapindales
- Family: Anacardiaceae
- Genus: Sorindeia
- Species: S. juglandifolia

Binomial name
- Sorindeia juglandifolia (A.Rich.) Planch. ex Oliv. 1868

Species of plant

Sorindeia juglandifolia is a species of scrambling shrub or tree within the family Anacardiaceae which occurs in tropical and southern Africa. The fruit it bears is edible and the fruit and leaves of the tree have traditionally been used in African folk medicine.

== Scientific research ==
A 2012 study investigated extracts from the fruits of Sorindeia juglandifolia for potential antimalarial activity. Researchers identified two compounds, 2,3,6-trihydroxybenzoic acid and 2,3,6-trihydroxy methyl benzoate, that showed inhibitory activity against Plasmodium falciparum in laboratory tests. One of the compounds also showed activity in a mouse model of malaria. The researchers concluded that further studies were needed to assess the compounds' potential for antimalarial drug development.
