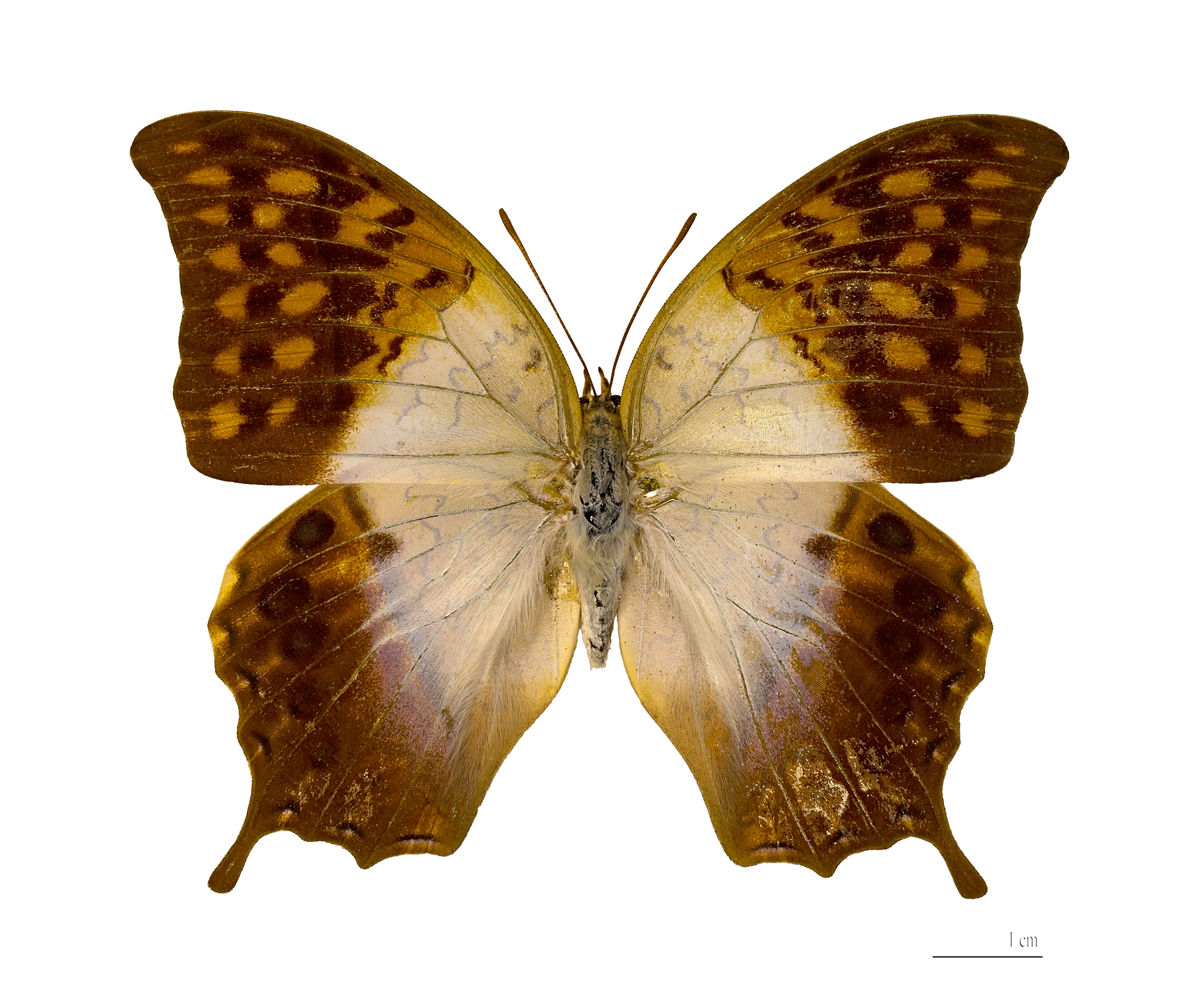
- In Malawi
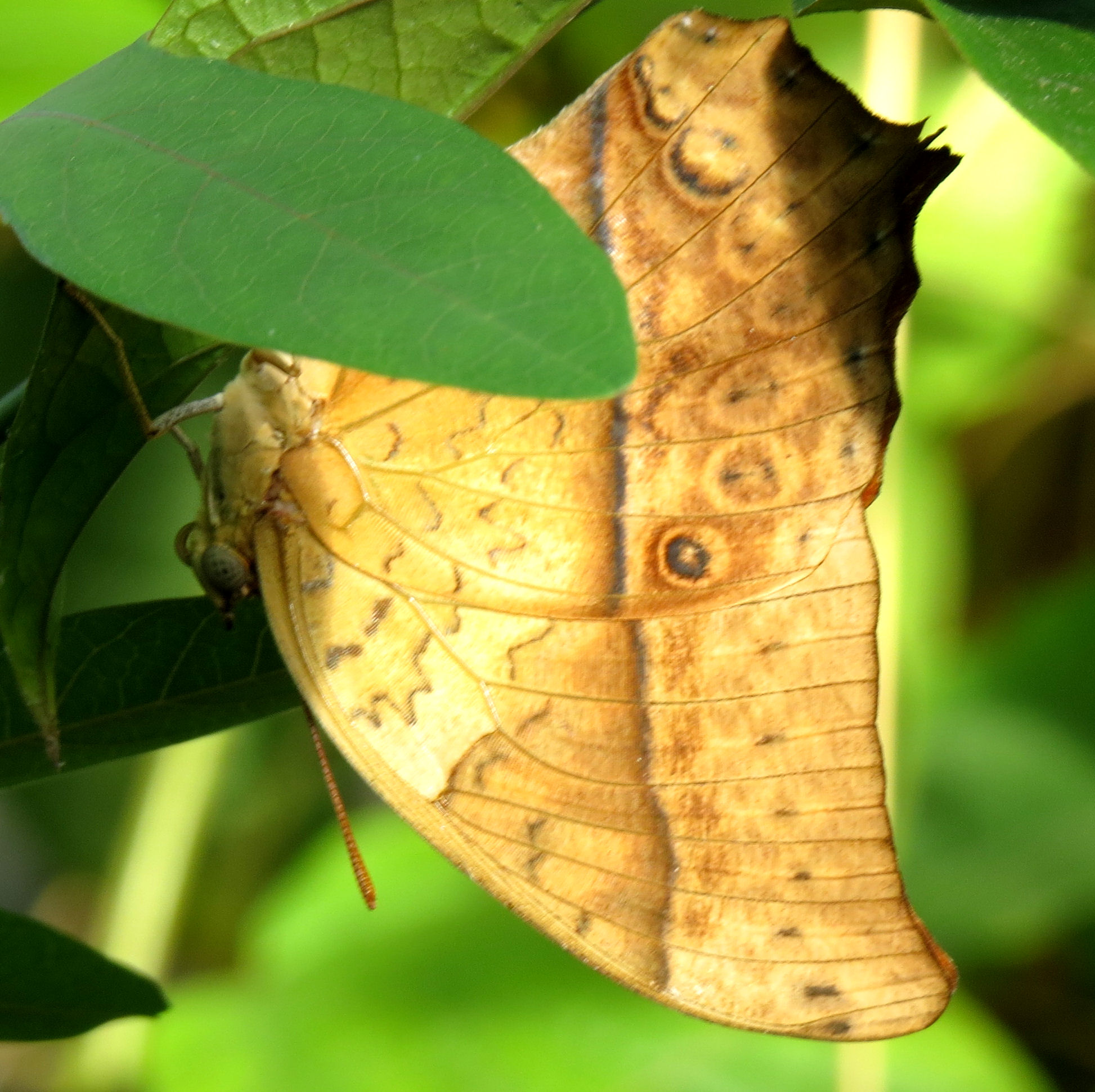
- Underside

Scientific classification
- Kingdom: Animalia
- Phylum: Arthropoda
- Clade: Pancrustacea
- Class: Insecta
- Order: Lepidoptera
- Family: Nymphalidae
- Genus: Charaxes
- Species: C. varanes

Binomial name
- Charaxes varanes (Cramer, 1764)

Synonyms
- Papilio varanes Cramer, 1777; Palla vologeses Mabille, 1876; Charaxes nigrescens Butler, 1896; Charaxes varanes brachycauda Le Cerf, 1923; Charaxes varanes vologeses ab. minor Storace, 1948; Charaxes varanes vologeses ab. antinorii Storace, 1948

= Charaxes varanes =

Pearl emperor

Species of butterfly

Charaxes varanes, the pearl emperor, Karkloof emperor, or pearl charaxes, is a butterfly of the family Nymphalidae, found in Africa from Saudi Arabia to South Africa.

The wingspan is 65–70 millimetres (2.6–2.8 in) in males and 70–90 millimetres (2.8–3.5 in) in females. Its flight period is year round.

Larvae feed on Allophylus species and Cardiospermum halicacabum.

== Description ==
The upperside of the body and roughly the inner half of the wings is white, sharply delineated on the forewings parallel to the length of the body, and diffusely delineated parallel to the margin of the hindwing. Outside the white area of the upperside, the wings are orange to brown, with a pattern of lighter and darker flecks. The underside of the body and wings mimic a dead leaf. A slightly diffuse but clear, sepia brown straight line divides the under wing in a zone next to the body and a zone near the wings' edges. The inner zone is mostly light beige with three parallel, curved, interrupted, grey-brown wavy lines, circling the wings' attachment to the body. A triangle based on the front of the forewing and bordering the division line has the dark grayish-brown color of the outer zone. The outer zone of the underside of the hindwing has a line of clear eyespots while the forewing has vaguer markings. The outer spur on the hindwing is well developed. Male and female are alike. A full description is given by Rothschild, W and Jordan, K.

== Behaviour ==
The pearl emperor is a large, actively, fast and high-flying butterfly. It is the most common Charaxes in the Gambia, where it is present throughout the year in various habitats. They are usually observed as single individuals flying fast and high. They mostly rest with closed wings, although males may sit high with slightly opened wings.

== Taxonomy ==
Charaxes varanes group. Type species of subgenus Stonehamia (Hadrodontes) The group members are:

- Charaxes varanes
- Charaxes fulvescens very similar to varanes
- Charaxes acuminatus very pointed forewing
- Charaxes balfouri
- Charaxes analava
- Charaxes nicati
- Charaxes bertrami perhaps subspecies of varanes
- Charaxes saperanus
- Charaxes defulvata

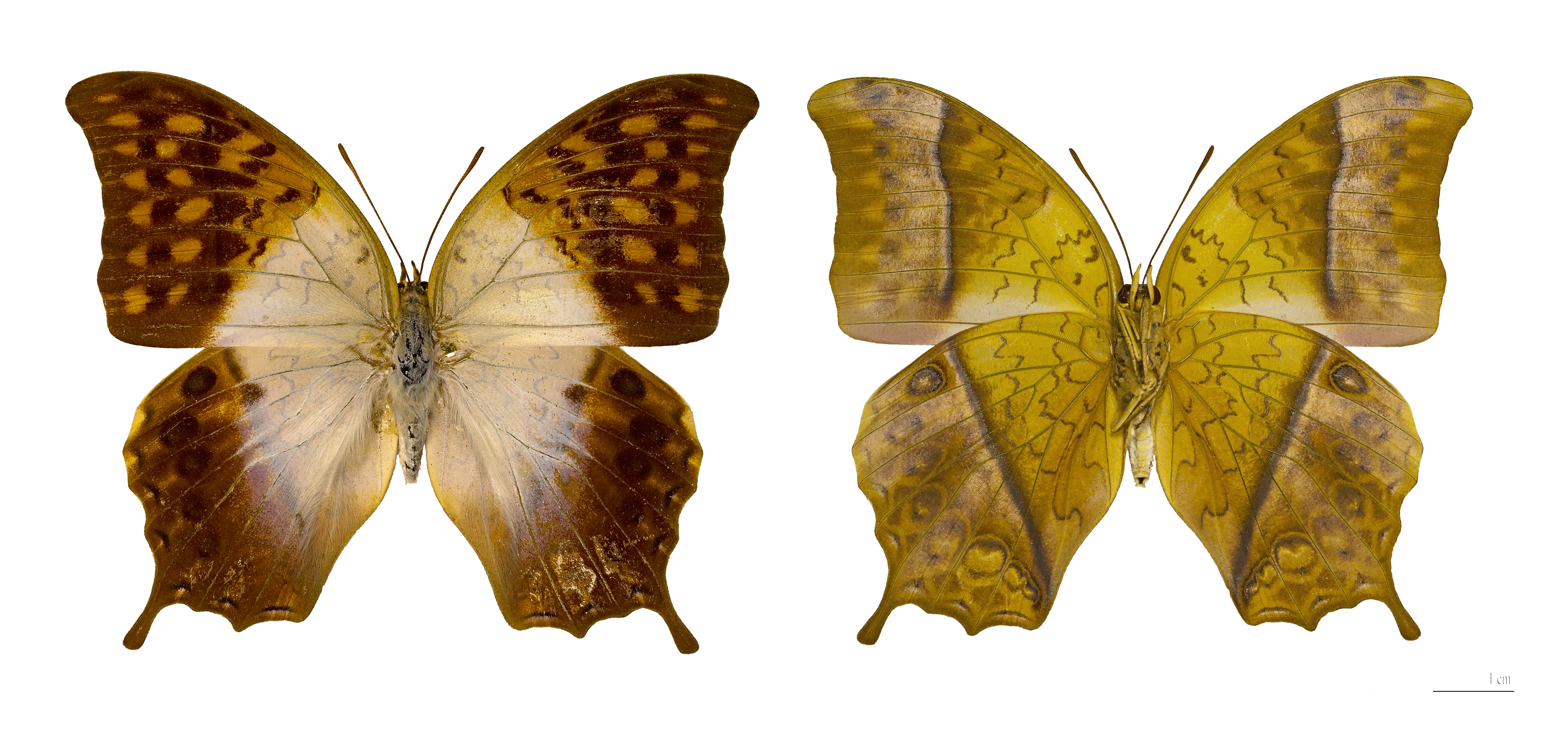
Charaxes varanes vologeses

== Subspecies ==
Listed alphabetically:

- C. v. bertrami Riley, 1931 – (Oman, eastern Yemen)
- C. v. torbeni Turlin, 1999 – (Yemen) Perhaps full species
- C. v. varanes (Cramer, 1764) – (southern Mozambique, South Africa, Eswatini)
- C. v. vologeses (Mabille, 1876) (Africa)

Torben Larsen developed a species numbering system for his 2005 publication Butterflies of West Africa. The subspecies vologeses is #725. The 'Larsen' numbers have since been used with permission in A Sharp Eye on Butterflies of Ghana.
