= Rosa calantha =

Scientific classification
- Kingdom: Plantae
- Clade: Embryophytes
- Clade: Tracheophytes
- Clade: Spermatophytes
- Clade: Angiosperms
- Clade: Eudicots
- Clade: Rosids
- Order: Rosales
- Family: Rosaceae
- Genus: Rosa
- Species: R. calantha

Binomial name
- Rosa calantha Tkatsch.

Species of flowering plant

Rosa calantha is a species of flowering plant in the family Rosaceae. It belongs to the genus Rosa and grows as a deciduous shrub in temperate environments. The species is native to Central Asia, specifically Kyrgyzstan. The name Rosa calantha was first published in Botaničeskii Zhurnal (Moscow & Leningrad) 64:218 (1979).
