= Sorindeia calantha =

Conservation status
- Vulnerable (IUCN 3.1)

Scientific classification
- Kingdom: Plantae
- Clade: Embryophytes
- Clade: Tracheophytes
- Clade: Angiosperms
- Clade: Eudicots
- Clade: Rosids
- Order: Sapindales
- Family: Anacardiaceae
- Genus: Sorindeia
- Species: S. calantha

Binomial name
- Sorindeia calantha Mildbr.

Species of flowering plant

Sorindeia calantha is a species of flowering plant in the family Anacardiaceae. It is native to Kenya and Tanzania. Its habitat is lowland riverine forest.
