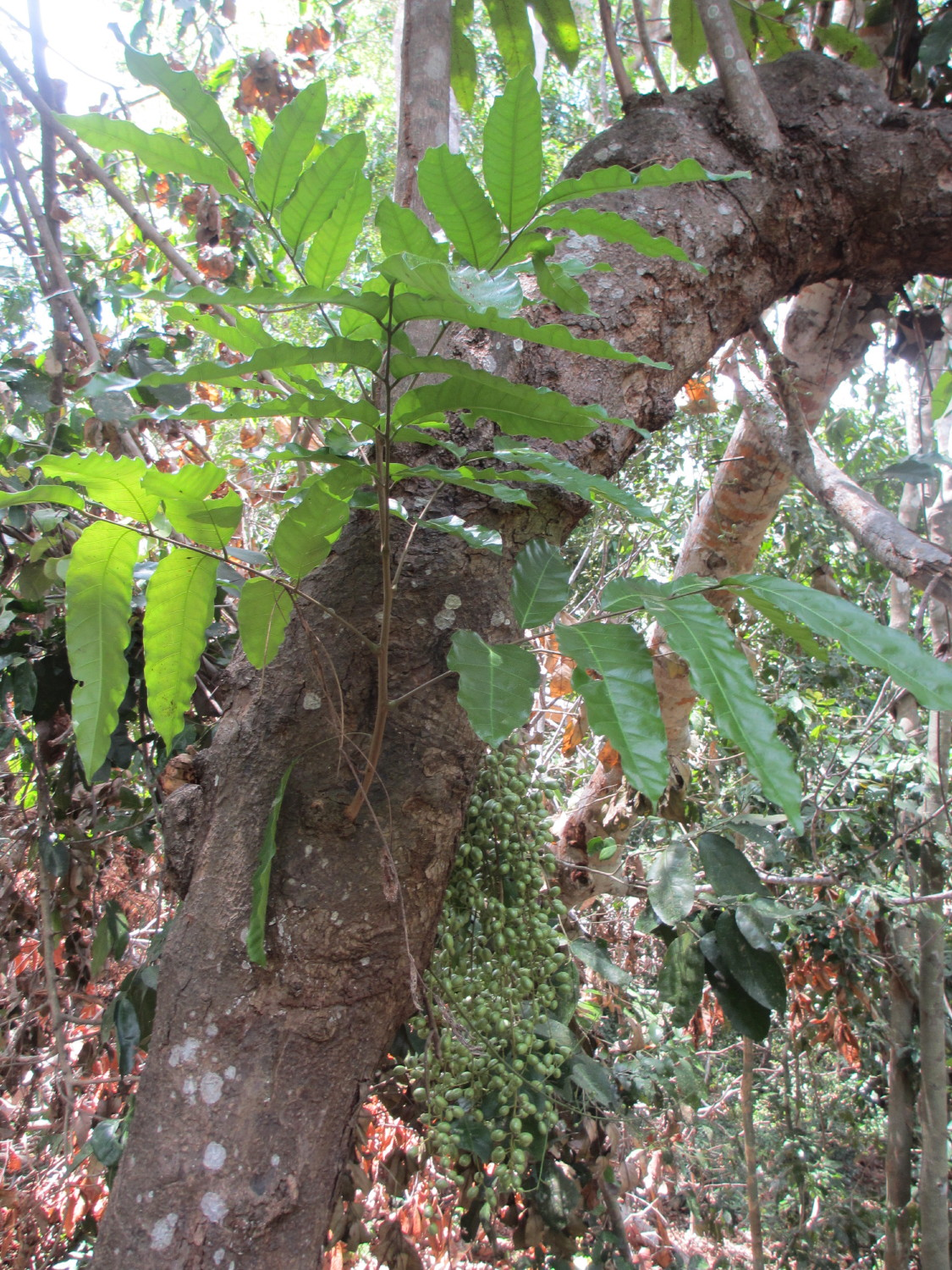
- Stem, leaves and fruits of Sorindeia madagascariensis

Scientific classification
- Kingdom: Plantae
- Clade: Tracheophytes
- Clade: Angiosperms
- Clade: Eudicots
- Clade: Rosids
- Order: Sapindales
- Family: Anacardiaceae
- Subfamily: Anacardioideae
- Genus: Sorindeia; Thouars (1806)

Synonyms
- Dupuisia A.Rich. (1832); Sorindeiopsis Engl. (1905)

= Sorindeia =

Genus of plants

Sorindeia is a genus of flowering plants in the cashew family, Anacardiaceae. It includes ten species native to tropical Africa, Madagascar, and the Comoro Islands. They are distinguished by their compound leaves, large inflorescences and distinctive fruit. In the case of S. madagascariensis, as many as 200 fruit may be carried on a pendant cluster.

== Species ==
Ten species are accepted.

- Sorindeia africana (Engl.) Van der Veken
- Sorindeia albiflora Engl. & K. Krause
- Sorindeia batekeensis Lecomte
- Sorindeia calantha Mildbr.
- Sorindeia gabonensis Bourobou
- Sorindeia grandifolia Engl.
- Sorindeia juglandifolia (A.Rich.) Planch. ex Oliv.
- Sorindeia madagascariensis (Spreng) DC.
- Sorindeia oxyandra Bourobou
- Sorindeia winkleri Engl.
