= Acacia calantha =

Conservation status
- Near Threatened (NCA)

Scientific classification
- Kingdom: Plantae
- Clade: Embryophytes
- Clade: Tracheophytes
- Clade: Angiosperms
- Clade: Eudicots
- Clade: Rosids
- Order: Fabales
- Family: Fabaceae
- Subfamily: Caesalpinioideae
- Clade: Mimosoid clade
- Genus: Acacia
- Species: A. calantha

Binomial name
- Acacia calantha Pedley
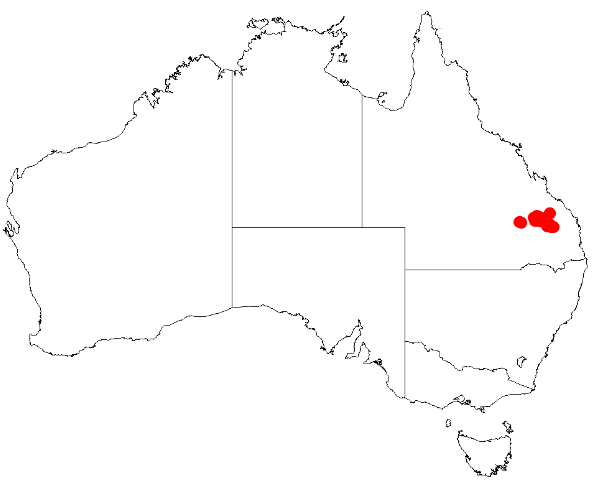
- Occurrence data from AVH

Synonyms
- Racosperma calanthum (Pedley) Pedley

Species of legume

Acacia calantha is a species of flowering plant in the family Fabaceae and is endemic to Queensland, Australia. It is a glabrous, moderately dense shrub with thread-like phyllodes, spherical heads of bright golden yellow flowers and narrowly oblong pods.

== Description ==
Acacia calantha is a glabrous, moderately dense, slightly sticky shrub that typically grows to a height of 1 to 3 metres (3 to 10 ft) and has slender, yellowish brown to grey branchlets. The phyllodes are thread-like, slightly bent, 70–150 mm (2.8–5.9 in) long and about 1 mm (0.039 in) wide. The flowers are borne in a spherical head in leaf axils on a peduncle 3–6 mm (0.12–0.24 in) long, each head with about 36 bright golden yellow flowers. Flowering has been observed from July to September and in December, and the pods are firmly papery to very thinly leathery, narrowly oblong, up to 60 mm (2.4 in) long and 5–6 mm (0.20–0.24 in) wide. The seeds are dark brown to black, oblong to elliptic, 3–4 mm (0.12–0.16 in) long with a cream-coloured aril.

== Taxonomy ==
Acacia calantha was first formally described by the botanist Leslie Pedley in 1980 in the journal Austrobaileya from specimens he collected in 1976, 18 km (11 mi) south of Cracow.

== Distribution and habitat ==
This species of wattle is endemic to an area around Cracow in south eastern Queensland in the Dawson River catchment. It is found on the lower slopes of steep sandstone hills and ridges growing in sandy to sandy-clay soils as a part of dry sclerophyll forest communities, and is often associated with species including Corymbia maculata, C. trachyphloia, Eucalyptus crebra, E. cloeziana, E. citriodora, C. tesselaris, Angophora leiocarpa, Lysicarpus angustifolius, Acacia podalyriifolia and A. crassa.

== Conservation status ==
Acacia calantha is listed as "near threatened" under the Queensland Government Nature Conservation Act 1992.

== See also ==
- List of Acacia species
