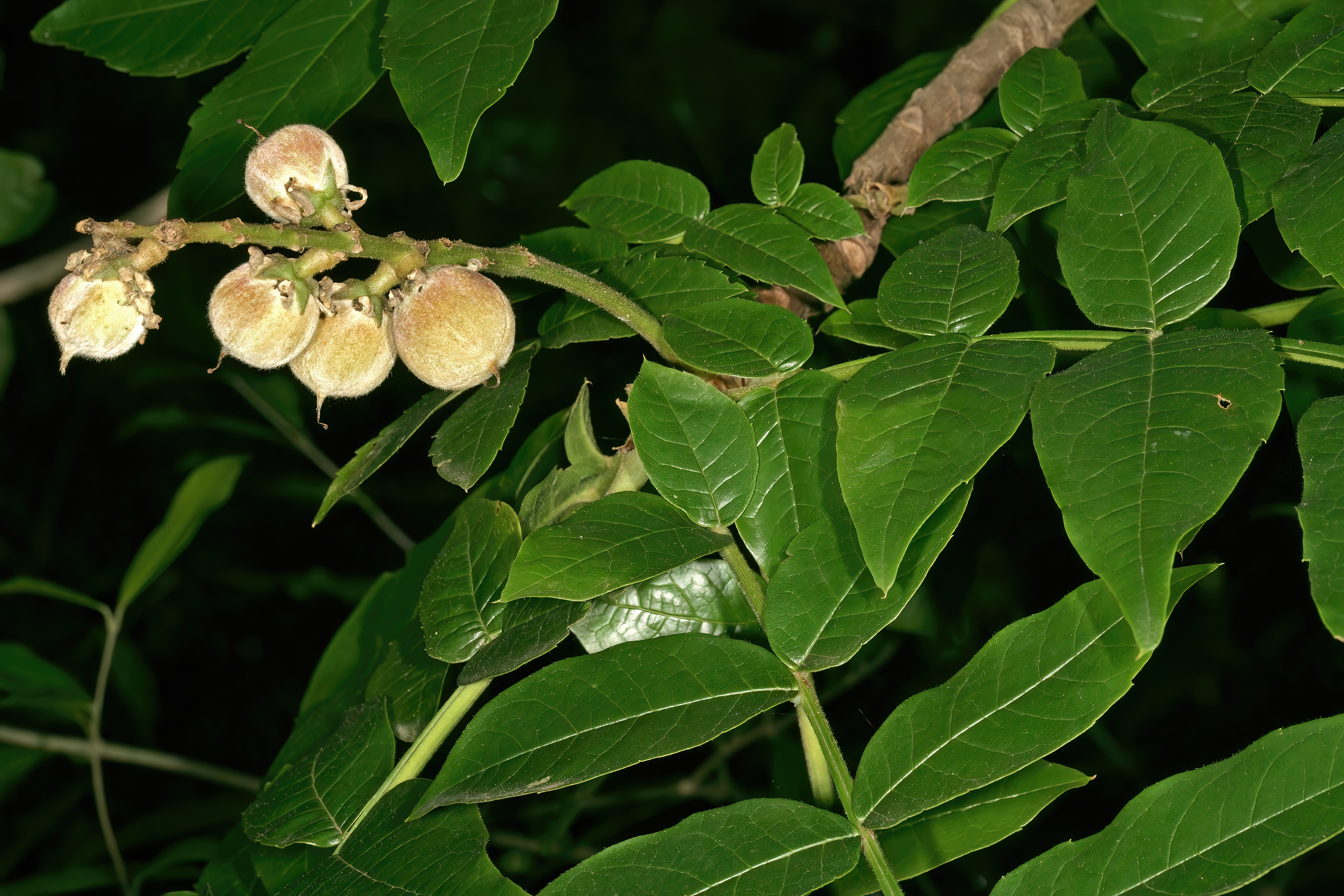

Conservation status
- Least Concern (IUCN 3.1)

Scientific classification
- Kingdom: Plantae
- Clade: Embryophytes
- Clade: Tracheophytes
- Clade: Angiosperms
- Clade: Eudicots
- Clade: Rosids
- Order: Geraniales
- Family: Francoaceae
- Genus: Bersama
- Species: B. abyssinica

Binomial name
- Bersama abyssinica Fresen.
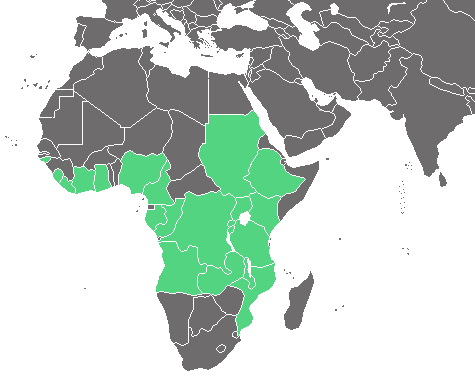
- Countries of occurrence

Synonyms
- Bersama schreberifolia; Bersama schweinfurthii; Bersama serrata; Bersama volkensii

= Bersama abyssinica =

Winged bersama

Species of tree

Bersama abyssinica is a species of medium-sized evergreen tree in the family Francoaceae. The leaves are pinnately divided with a strongly winged rachis (hence the common name winged bersama). The inflorescence is a spike.

This species is distributed across sub-Saharan Africa and includes two subspecies:

- B. abyssinica Fresen. subsp. abyssinica Fresen.
- B. abyssinica Fresen. subsp. rosea (Hoyle) Mikkelsen

The subspecies rosea is endemic to Tanzania, where it is considered vulnerable.

Bersama abyssinica produces a hard, heavy wood that is used in the construction of houses in West Africa.
