= Charaxes defulvata =

Scientific classification
- Kingdom: Animalia
- Phylum: Arthropoda
- Class: Insecta
- Order: Lepidoptera
- Family: Nymphalidae
- Genus: Charaxes
- Species: C. defulvata

Binomial name
- Charaxes defulvata Joicey & Talbot, 1926

Species of butterfly

Charaxes defulvata is a butterfly in the family Nymphalidae. It is found on the island of São Tomé. The habitat consists of forests. The species of butterfly was named by James John Joicey and George Talbot in 1926.

== Taxonomy ==
The species is often treated as a subspecies of Charaxes varanes following Van Someren in 1974. In 1983, it was given full species status again by Plantrou. It is considered a member of the Charaxes varanes group.
