= List of butterflies of Nigeria =

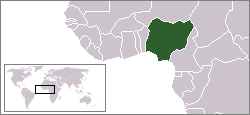
Location of Nigeria

This is a list of butterflies of Nigeria. About 1,319 species are known from Nigeria, 50 of which are endemic.

== Papilionidae ==
=== Papilioninae ===
==== Papilionini ====
- Papilio antimachus Drury, 1782
- Papilio nireus Linnaeus, 1758
- Papilio charopus Westwood, 1843
- Papilio chrapkowskoides nurettini Koçak, 1983
- Papilio cynorta Fabricius, 1793
- Papilio cyproeofila cyproeofila Butler, 1868
- Papilio cyproeofila praecyola Suffert, 1904
- Papilio dardanus Brown, 1776
- Papilio demodocus Esper, [1798]
- Papilio gallienus Distant, 1879
- Papilio hesperus Westwood, 1843
- Papilio menestheus Drury, 1773
- Papilio phorcas congoanus Rothschild, 1896
- Papilio phorcas phorcas Cramer, 1775
- Papilio plagiatus Aurivillius, 1898
- Papilio rex schultzei Aurivillius, 1904
- Papilio sosia Rothschild & Jordan, 1903
- Papilio zalmoxis Hewitson, 1864
- Papilio zenobia Fabricius, 1775

==== Leptocercini ====
- Graphium adamastor (Boisduval, 1836)
- Graphium agamedes (Westwood, 1842)
- Graphium almansor escherichi (Gaede, 1915)
- Graphium angolanus baronis (Ungemach, 1932)
- Graphium antheus (Cramer, 1779)
- Graphium biokoensis (Gauthier, 1984)
- Graphium illyris hamatus (Joicey & Talbot, 1918)
- Graphium latreillianus theorini (Aurivillius, 1881)
- Graphium leonidas (Fabricius, 1793)
- Graphium liponesco (Suffert, 1904)
- Graphium policenes policenes (Cramer, 1775)
- Graphium policenes telloi Hecq, 1999
- Graphium polistratus (Grose-Smith, 1889)
- Graphium ridleyanus (White, 1843)
- Graphium simoni (Aurivillius, 1899)
- Graphium tynderaeus (Fabricius, 1793)
- Graphium ucalegon (Hewitson, 1865)

== Pieridae ==
=== Pseudopontiinae ===
- Pseudopontia paradoxa (Felder & Felder, 1869)

=== Coliadinae ===
- Colias electo manengoubensis Darge, 1968
- Eurema brigitta (Stoll, [1780])
- Eurema desjardinsii marshalli (Butler, 1898)
- Eurema floricola leonis (Butler, 1886)
- Eurema hapale (Mabille, 1882)
- Eurema hecabe solifera (Butler, 1875)
- Eurema regularis (Butler, 1876)
- Eurema senegalensis (Boisduval, 1836)

=== Pierinae ===
- Colotis amata calais (Cramer, 1775)
- Colotis antevippe (Boisduval, 1836)
- Colotis aurora evarne (Klug, 1829)
- Colotis celimene sudanicus (Aurivillius, 1905)
- Colotis chrysonome (Klug, 1829)
- Colotis daira stygia (Felder & Felder, 1865)
- Colotis danae eupompe (Klug, 1829)
- Colotis elgonensis glauningi (Schultze, 1909)
- Colotis eris (Klug, 1829)
- Colotis euippe (Linnaeus, 1758)
- Colotis evagore antigone (Boisduval, 1836)
- Colotis halimede (Klug, 1829)
- Colotis ione (Godart, 1819)
- Colotis liagore (Klug, 1829)
- Colotis phisadia (Godart, 1819)
- Colotis protomedia (Klug, 1829)
- Colotis vesta amelia (Lucas, 1852)
- Eronia cleodora Hübner, 1823
- Eronia leda (Boisduval, 1847)
- Leptosia alcesta (Stoll, [1782])
- Leptosia hybrida Bernardi, 1952
- Leptosia marginea (Mabille, 1890)
- Leptosia medusa (Cramer, 1777)
- Leptosia nupta (Butler, 1873)
- Leptosia wigginsi pseudalcesta Bernardi, 1965
- Nepheronia argia (Fabricius, 1775)
- Nepheronia buquetii (Boisduval, 1836)
- Nepheronia pharis (Boisduval, 1836)
- Nepheronia thalassina (Boisduval, 1836)
- Pinacopterix eriphia tritogenia (Klug, 1829)

==== Pierini ====
- Appias epaphia (Cramer, [1779])
- Appias phaola (Doubleday, 1847)
- Appias sabina (Felder & Felder, [1865])
- Appias sylvia (Fabricius, 1775)
- Belenois aurota (Fabricius, 1793)
- Belenois calypso (Drury, 1773)
- Belenois creona (Cramer, [1776])
- Belenois gidica (Godart, 1819)
- Belenois hedyle (Cramer, 1777)
- Belenois solilucis Butler, 1874
- Belenois subeida (Felder & Felder, 1865)
- Belenois theora (Doubleday, 1846)
- Belenois theuszi (Dewitz, 1889)
- Belenois zochalia connexiva (Joicey & Talbot, 1927)
- Dixeia capricornus (Ward, 1871)
- Dixeia cebron (Ward, 1871)
- Dixeia doxo (Godart, 1819)
- Dixeia orbona (Geyer, [1837])
- Mylothris aburi Larsen & Collins, 2003
- Mylothris asphodelus Butler, 1888
- Mylothris chloris (Fabricius, 1775)
- Mylothris eximia Hecq, 2005 (endemic)
- Mylothris flaviana Grose-Smith, 1898
- Mylothris hilara (Karsch, 1892)
- Mylothris jacksoni knutssoni Aurivillius, 1891
- Mylothris jaopura Karsch, 1893
- Mylothris knoopi Hecq, 2005 (endemic)
- Mylothris lucens Hecq, 2005 (endemic)
- Mylothris ochracea Aurivillius, 1895
- Mylothris primulina Butler, 1897 (endemic)
- Mylothris rembina (Plötz, 1880)
- Mylothris rhodope (Fabricius, 1775)
- Mylothris rueppellii josi Larsen, 1986
- Mylothris schumanni Suffert, 1904
- Mylothris sjostedti Aurivillius, 1895
- Mylothris sulphurea Aurivillius, 1895
- Mylothris yulei bansoana Talbot, 1944

== Lycaenidae ==
=== Miletinae ===
==== Liphyrini ====
- Aslauga bella Bethune-Baker, 1913
- Aslauga camerunica Stempffer, 1969
- Aslauga ernesti (Karsch, 1895)
- Aslauga lamborni Bethune-Baker, 1914
- Aslauga marginalis Kirby, 1890
- Aslauga marshalli adamaoua Libert, 1994
- Aslauga vininga (Hewitson, 1875)
- Euliphyra hewitsoni Aurivillius, 1899
- Euliphyra leucyania (Hewitson, 1874)
- Euliphyra mirifica Holland, 1890

==== Miletini ====
- Megalopalpus angulosus Grünberg, 1910
- Megalopalpus metaleucus Karsch, 1893
- Megalopalpus simplex Röber, 1886
- Megalopalpus zymna (Westwood, 1851)
- Spalgis lemolea lemolea Druce, 1890
- Spalgis lemolea pilos Druce, 1890
- Lachnocnema emperamus (Snellen, 1872)
- Lachnocnema divergens Gaede, 1915
- Lachnocnema vuattouxi Libert, 1996
- Lachnocnema reutlingeri Holland, 1892
- Lachnocnema luna Druce, 1910
- Lachnocnema magna Aurivillius, 1895
- Lachnocnema albimacula Libert, 1996
- Lachnocnema exiguus Holland, 1890
- Lachnocnema disrupta Talbot, 1935

=== Poritiinae ===
==== Liptenini ====
- Alaena exotica Collins & Larsen, 2005 (endemic)
- Ptelina carnuta (Hewitson, 1873)
- Pentila maculata (Kirby, 1887)
- Pentila camerunica Stempffer & Bennett, 1961
- Pentila glagoessa (Holland, 1893)
- Pentila hewitsoni hewitsoni (Grose-Smith & Kirby, 1887)
- Pentila hewitsoni limbata (Holland, 1893)
- Pentila nigeriana Stempffer & Bennett, 1961 (endemic)
- Pentila occidentalium Aurivillius, 1899
- Pentila pauli Staudinger, 1888
- Pentila petreia Hewitson, 1874
- Pentila picena catori Bethune-Baker, 1906
- Pentila picena cydaria (Grose-Smith, 1898)
- Pentila pseudorotha Stempffer & Bennett, 1961
- Pentila tachyroides Dewitz, 1879
- Pentila umangiana prodita Schultze, 1923
- Telipna acraea acraea (Westwood, [1851])
- Telipna acraea fervida (Grose-Smith & Kirby, 1890)
- Telipna rothi (Grose-Smith, 1898) (endemic)
- Telipna albofasciata Aurivillius, 1910
- Telipna cameroonensis Jackson, 1969
- Telipna rufilla (Grose-Smith, 1901) (endemic)
- Telipna sanguinea (Plötz, 1880)
- Telipna ruspinoides Schultze, 1923
- Ornipholidotos kirbyi (Aurivillius. 1895)
- Ornipholidotos maesseni Libert, 2005
- Ornipholidotos boormani Libert, 2005 (endemic)
- Ornipholidotos nigeriae Stempffer, 1964
- Ornipholidotos onitshae Stempffer, 1962
- Ornipholidotos nympha Libert, 2000
- Torbenia larseni (Stempffer, 1969)
- Torbenia wojtusiaki Libert, 2000
- Torbenia persimilis Libert, 2000
- Mimacraea charmian Grose-Smith & Kirby, 1889
- Mimacraea darwinia Butler, 1872
- Mimacraea apicalis Grose-Smith & Kirby, 1889
- Mimacraea maesseni Libert, 2000
- Mimacraea neurata Holland, 1895
- Mimeresia cellularis (Kirby, 1890)
- Mimeresia debora debora (Kirby, 1890)
- Mimeresia debora catori (Bethune-Baker, 1904)
- Mimeresia dinora (Kirby, 1890)
- Mimeresia drucei owerri Stempffer, 1961
- Mimeresia libentina (Hewitson, 1866)
- Liptena albicans Cator, 1904
- Liptena alluaudi Mabille, 1890
- Liptena augusta Suffert, 1904
- Liptena bassae Bethune-Baker, 1926 (endemic)
- Liptena bolivari Kheil, 1905
- Liptena catalina (Grose-Smith & Kirby, 1887)
- Liptena decipiens (Kirby, 1890)
- Liptena despecta (Holland, 1890)
- Liptena eketi Bethune-Baker, 1926
- Liptena eukrinaria Bethune-Baker, 1926
- Liptena evanescens (Kirby, 1887)
- Liptena fatima (Kirby, 1890)
- Liptena ferrymani (Grose-Smith & Kirby, 1891)
- Liptena flavicans oniens Talbot, 1935
- Liptena ilaro Stempffer, Bennett & May, 1974 (endemic)
- Liptena modesta (Kirby, 1890)
- Liptena opaca (Kirby, 1890)
- Liptena orubrum (Holland, 1890)
- Liptena pearmani Stempffer, Bennett & May, 1974
- Liptena priscilla Larsen, 1995 (endemic)
- Liptena rochei Stempffer, 1951
- Liptena sauberi Schultze, 1912
- Liptena septistrigata (Bethune-Baker, 1903)
- Liptena similis (Kirby, 1890)
- Liptena simplicia Möschler, 1887
- Liptena submacula Lathy, 1903
- Liptena titei Stempffer, Bennett & May, 1974
- Liptena xanthostola (Holland, 1890)
- Obania subvariegata (Grose-Smith & Kirby, 1890)
- Obania tullia (Staudinger, 1892)
- Kakumia otlauga (Grose-Smith & Kirby, 1890)
- Tetrarhanis nubifera (Druce, 1910)
- Tetrarhanis ogojae (Stempffer, 1961)
- Tetrarhanis okwangwo Larsen, 1998
- Tetrarhanis onitshae (Stempffer, 1962) (endemic)
- Tetrarhanis simplex (Aurivillius, 1895)
- Tetrarhanis stempfferi (Berger, 1954)
- Tetrarhanis symplocus Clench, 1965
- Falcuna campimus (Holland, 1890)
- Falcuna gitte Bennett, 1969 (endemic)
- Falcuna libyssa (Hewitson, 1866)
- Larinopoda aspidos Druce, 1890
- Larinopoda lagyra (Hewitson, 1866)
- Larinopoda lircaea (Hewitson, 1866)
- Micropentila adelgitha (Hewitson, 1874)
- Micropentila adelgunda (Staudinger, 1892)
- Micropentila brunnea (Kirby, 1887)
- Micropentila dorothea Bethune-Baker, 1903
- Micropentila flavopunctata Stempffer & Bennett, 1965
- Micropentila fuscula (Grose-Smith, 1898)
- Micropentila nigeriana Stempffer & Bennett, 1965
- Micropentila ogojae Stempffer & Bennett, 1965
- Pseuderesia eleaza (Hewitson, 1873)
- Eresina fontainei Stempffer, 1956
- Eresina fusca (Cator, 1904)
- Eresina jacksoni Stempffer, 1961
- Eresina maesseni Stempffer, 1956
- Eresina pseudofusca Stempffer, 1961
- Eresina rougeoti Stempffer, 1956
- Eresina saundersi Stempffer, 1956
- Eresina schmitti Larsen, 2005 (endemic)
- Eresina theodori Stempffer, 1956
- Eresiomera bicolor (Grose-Smith & Kirby, 1890)
- Eresiomera cornesi (Stempffer, 1969) (endemic)
- Eresiomera isca isca (Hewitson, 1873)
- Eresiomera isca occidentalis Collins & Larsen, 1998
- Eresiomera nigeriana (Stempffer, 1962) (endemic)
- Citrinophila erastus (Hewitson, 1866)
- Citrinophila marginalis Kirby, 1887
- Citrinophila similis (Kirby, 1887)
- Citrinophila tenera (Kirby, 1887)
- Argyrocheila undifera Staudinger, 1892

==== Epitolini ====
- Toxochitona gerda (Kirby, 1890)
- Iridana exquisita (Grose-Smith, 1898)
- Iridana incredibilis (Staudinger, 1891)
- Iridana nigeriana Stempffer, 1964
- Iridana rougeoti Stempffer, 1964
- Teratoneura isabellae Dudgeon, 1909
- Epitola posthumus (Fabricius, 1793)
- Epitola urania Kirby, 1887
- Cerautola ceraunia (Hewitson, 1873)
- Cerautola crowleyi (Sharpe, 1890)
- Cerautola legeri Libert, 1999 (endemic)
- Cerautola miranda miranda (Staudinger, 1889)
- Cerautola miranda vidua (Talbot, 1935)
- Cerautola semibrunnea (Bethune-Baker, 1916)
- Geritola daveyi (Roche, 1954)
- Geritola frankdaveyi Libert, 1999 (endemic)
- Geritola gerina (Hewitson, 1878)
- Geritola goodii (Holland, 1890)
- Geritola virginea (Bethune-Baker, 1904)
- Stempfferia annae Libert, 1999
- Stempfferia boormani Libert, 1999 (endemic)
- Stempfferia carcina (Hewitson, 1873)
- Stempfferia cercene (Hewitson, 1873)
- Stempfferia cercenoides (Holland, 1890)
- Stempfferia congoana (Aurivillius, 1923)
- Stempfferia elissa (Grose-Smith, 1898)
- Stempfferia francisci Libert, 1999 (endemic)
- Stempfferia gordoni (Druce, 1903)
- Stempfferia ife Libert, 1999 (endemic)
- Stempfferia katherinae (Poulton, 1929) (endemic)
- Stempfferia kholifa (Bethune-Baker, 1904)
- Stempfferia marginata (Kirby, 1887)
- Stempfferia michelae michelae Libert, 1999
- Stempfferia michelae centralis Libert, 1999
- Stempfferia moyambina (Bethune-Baker, 1903)
- Stempfferia subtumescens Libert, 1999 (endemic)
- Stempfferia tumentia (Druce, 1910)
- Stempfferia uniformis (Kirby, 1887) (endemic)
- Stempfferia zelza (Hewitson, 1873)
- Cephetola cephena (Hewitson, 1873)
- Cephetola collinsi Libert & Larsen, 1999
- Cephetola mercedes (Suffert, 1904)
- Cephetola nigeriae (Jackson, 1962)
- Cephetola nigra (Bethune-Baker, 1903)
- Cephetola obscura (Hawker-Smith, 1933)
- Cephetola pinodes pinodes (Druce, 1890)
- Cephetola pinodes budduana (Talbot, 1937)
- Cephetola subcoerulea (Roche, 1954)
- Cephetola sublustris (Bethune-Baker, 1904)
- Tumerepedes flava Bethune-Baker, 1913 (endemic)
- Neaveia lamborni Druce, 1910
- Epitolina dispar (Kirby, 1887)
- Epitolina melissa (Druce, 1888)
- Epitolina collinsi Libert, 2000
- Epitolina catori Bethune-Baker, 1904
- Epitolina larseni Libert, 2000
- Hypophytala benitensis (Holland, 1890)
- Hypophytala henleyi (Kirby, 1890)
- Hypophytala hyettoides (Aurivillius, 1895)
- Hypophytala nigrescens (Jackson, 1964) (endemic)
- Hypophytala ultramarina Libert & Collins, 1999
- Phytala elais Westwood, 1851
- Aethiopana honorius honorius (Fabricius, 1793)
- Aethiopana honorius divisa (Butler, 1901)
- Hewitsonia bitjeana Bethune-Baker, 1915
- Hewitsonia beryllina Schultze, 1916
- Hewitsonia boisduvalii boisduvalii (Hewitson, 1869)
- Hewitsonia boisduvalii borealis Schultze, 1916
- Hewitsonia danane Stempffer, 1969
- Hewitsonia inexpectata Bouyer, 1997
- Hewitsonia kirbyi Dewitz, 1879
- Hewitsonia occidentalis Bouyer, 1997

=== Aphnaeinae ===
- Pseudaletis agrippina Druce, 1888
- Pseudaletis cornesi Collins & Libert, 2007 (endemic)
- Pseudaletis catori Bethune-Baker, 1926
- Pseudaletis clymenus (Druce, 1885)
- Pseudaletis zebra Holland, 1891
- Pseudaletis taeniata Libert, 2007
- Pseudaletis leonis (Staudinger, 1888)
- Pseudaletis antimachus (Staudinger, 1888)
- Lipaphnaeus aderna (Plötz, 1880)
- Lipaphnaeus leonina bitje (Druce, 1910)
- Lipaphnaeus leonina ivoirensis Stempffer, 1966
- Cigaritis avriko (Karsch, 1893)
- Cigaritis buchanani (Rothschild, 1921)
- Cigaritis crustaria (Holland, 1890)
- Cigaritis menelas (Druce, 1907)
- Cigaritis mozambica (Bertoloni, 1850)
- Cigaritis nilus (Hewitson, 1865)
- Zeritis neriene Boisduval, 1836
- Axiocerses harpax (Fabricius, 1775)
- Axiocerses callaghani Henning & Henning, 1996
- Axiocerses amanga borealis Aurivillius, 1905
- Aphnaeus argyrocyclus Holland, 1890
- Aphnaeus asterius Plötz, 1880
- Aphnaeus brahami Lathy, 1903
- Aphnaeus orcas (Drury, 1782)

=== Theclinae ===
- Myrina silenus (Fabricius, 1775)
- Myrina subornata Lathy, 1903
- Oxylides albata (Aurivillius, 1895)
- Oxylides faunus faunus (Drury, 1773)
- Oxylides faunus camerunica Libert, 2004
- Syrmoptera amasa (Hewitson, 1869)
- Syrmoptera bonifacei Stempffer, 1961
- Dapidodigma demeter Clench, 1961
- Dapidodigma hymen (Fabricius, 1775)
- Hypolycaena anara Larsen, 1986
- Hypolycaena antifaunus (Westwood, 1851)
- Hypolycaena coerulea Aurivillius, 1895
- Hypolycaena dubia Aurivillius, 1895
- Hypolycaena hatita Hewitson, 1865
- Hypolycaena kadiskos Druce, 1890
- Hypolycaena kakumi Larsen, 1997
- Hypolycaena lebona (Hewitson, 1865)
- Hypolycaena liara Druce, 1890
- Hypolycaena nigra Bethune-Baker, 1914
- Hypolycaena philippus (Fabricius, 1793)
- Hypolycaena scintillans Stempffer, 1957
- Iolaus eurisus (Cramer, 1779)
- Iolaus aethria Karsch, 1893
- Iolaus agnes Aurivillius, 1898
- Iolaus alienus bicaudatus Aurivillius, 1905
- Iolaus aurivillii Röber, 1900
- Iolaus bellina (Plötz, 1880)
- Iolaus coelestis Bethune-Baker, 1926
- Iolaus creta Hewitson, 1878
- Iolaus cytaeis Hewitson, 1875
- Iolaus farquharsoni (Bethune-Baker, 1922)
- Iolaus adorabilis Collins & Larsen, 2008
- Iolaus fontainei (Stempffer, 1956)
- Iolaus frater kumboae (Bethune-Baker, 1926)
- Iolaus gemmarius (Druce, 1910)
- Iolaus iasis Hewitson, 1865
- Iolaus laon Hewitson, 1878
- Iolaus longicauda (Stempffer & Bennett, 1959)
- Iolaus maesa (Hewitson, 1862)
- Iolaus neavei (Druce, 1910)
- Iolaus normani (Larsen, 1986)
- Iolaus pollux Aurivillius, 1895
- Iolaus sappirus (Druce, 1902)
- Iolaus scintillans Aurivillius, 1905
- Iolaus sciophilus (Schultze, 1916)
- Iolaus sudanicus Aurivillius, 1905
- Iolaus menas Druce, 1890
- Iolaus iulus Hewitson, 1869
- Iolaus parasilanus maesseni (Stempffer & Bennett, 1958)
- Iolaus ismenias (Klug, 1834)
- Iolaus newporti Larsen, 1994 (endemic)
- Iolaus alcibiades Kirby, 1871
- Iolaus paneperata Druce, 1890
- Iolaus lukabas Druce, 1890
- Iolaus calisto (Westwood, 1851)
- Iolaus laonides Aurivillius, 1898
- Iolaus poecilaon (Riley, 1928)
- Iolaus ofere Collins & Larsen, 2008
- Iolaus timon (Fabricius, 1787)
- Iolaus catori Bethune-Baker, 1904
- Stugeta marmoreus (Butler, 1866)
- Pilodeudorix mimeta mimeta (Karsch, 1895)
- Pilodeudorix mimeta oreas Libert, 2004
- Pilodeudorix ula (Karsch, 1895)
- Pilodeudorix virgata (Druce, 1891)
- Pilodeudorix anetia (Hulstaert, 1924)
- Pilodeudorix angelita schultzei (Aurivillius, 1907)
- Pilodeudorix aruma aruma (Hewitson, 1873)
- Pilodeudorix aruma nigeriana Libert, 2004
- Pilodeudorix catori (Bethune-Baker, 1903)
- Pilodeudorix infuscata (Stempffer, 1964)
- Pilodeudorix leonina dimitris (d'Abrera, 1980)
- Pilodeudorix mera (Hewitson, 1873
- Pilodeudorix otraeda genuba (Hewitson, 1875)
- Pilodeudorix caerulea (Druce, 1890)
- Pilodeudorix camerona (Plötz, 1880)
- Pilodeudorix congoana (Aurivillius, 1923)
- Pilodeudorix diyllus (Hewitson, 1878)
- Pilodeudorix zela (Hewitson, 1869)
- Pilodeudorix aucta (Karsch, 1895)
- Pilodeudorix hugoi Libert, 2004
- Pilodeudorix catalla (Karsch, 1895)
- Pilodeudorix deritas (Hewitson, 1874)
- Pilodeudorix pseudoderitas (Stempffer, 1964)
- Pilodeudorix violetta (Aurivillius, 1897)
- Paradeudorix boormani (Larsen, 1996) (endemic)
- Paradeudorix cobaltina (Stempffer, 1964)
- Paradeudorix eleala eleala (Hewitson, 1865)
- Paradeudorix eleala viridis (Stempffer, 1964)
- Paradeudorix ituri (Bethune-Baker, 1908)
- Paradeudorix marginata (Stempffer, 1962)
- Paradeudorix moyambina (Bethune-Baker, 1904)
- Paradeudorix petersi (Stempffer & Bennett, 1956)
- Hypomyrina mimetica Libert, 2004
- Hypomyrina fournierae Gabriel, 1939
- Deudorix antalus (Hopffer, 1855)
- Deudorix caliginosa Lathy, 1903
- Deudorix dinochares Grose-Smith, 1887
- Deudorix dinomenes diomedes Jackson, 1966
- Deudorix galathea (Swainson, 1821)
- Deudorix lorisona (Hewitson, 1862)
- Deudorix odana Druce, 1887
- Capys stuarti Collins & Larsen, 2000 (endemic)

=== Polyommatinae ===
==== Lycaenesthini ====
- Anthene afra (Bethune-Baker, 1910)
- Anthene amarah (Guérin-Méneville, 1849)
- Anthene crawshayi (Butler, 1899)
- Anthene definita (Butler, 1899)
- Anthene emkopoti Larsen & Collins, 1998
- Anthene flavomaculatus (Grose-Smith & Kirby, 1893)
- Anthene irumu (Stempffer, 1948)
- Anthene juba (Fabricius, 1787)
- Anthene kampala (Bethune-Baker, 1910)
- Anthene lachares (Hewitson, 1878)
- Anthene larydas (Cramer, 1780)
- Anthene leptines (Hewitson, 1874)
- Anthene ligures (Hewitson, 1874)
- Anthene liodes (Hewitson, 1874)
- Anthene locuples (Grose-Smith, 1898)
- Anthene lunulata (Trimen, 1894)
- Anthene lychnides (Hewitson, 1878)
- Anthene lysicles (Hewitson, 1874)
- Anthene mahota (Grose-Smith, 1887)
- Anthene kikuyu (Bethune-Baker, 1910)
- Anthene princeps (Butler, 1876)
- Anthene rubricinctus (Holland, 1891)
- Anthene scintillula scintillula (Holland, 1891)
- Anthene scintillula aurea (Bethune-Baker, 1910)
- Anthene sylvanus (Drury, 1773)
- Anthene versatilis bitje (Druce, 1910)
- Anthene lamprocles (Hewitson, 1878)
- Anthene lyzanius (Hewitson, 1874)
- Anthene chryseostictus (Bethune-Baker, 1910)
- Anthene fulvus Stempffer, 1962
- Anthene lusones (Hewitson, 1874)
- Anthene staudingeri (Grose-Smith & Kirby, 1894)
- Anthene africana (Bethune-Baker, 1926)
- Anthene coerulea (Aurivillius, 1895)
- Anthene fasciatus (Aurivillius, 1895)
- Anthene hades (Bethune-Baker, 1910)
- Anthene inconspicua (Druce, 1910)
- Anthene lacides (Hewitson, 1874)
- Anthene lamias (Hewitson, 1878)
- Anthene lucretilis (Hewitson, 1874)
- Anthene marshalli (Bethune-Baker, 1903)
- Anthene nigeriae (Aurivillius, 1905)
- Anthene obscura (Druce, 1910)
- Anthene phoenicis (Karsch, 1893)
- Anthene rufoplagata (Bethune-Baker, 1910)
- Cupidesthes arescopa Bethune-Baker, 1910
- Cupidesthes leonina (Bethune-Baker, 1903)
- Cupidesthes lithas (Druce, 1890)
- Cupidesthes mimetica (Druce, 1910)
- Cupidesthes paralithas Bethune-Baker, 1926
- Cupidesthes robusta Aurivillius, 1895

==== Polyommatini ====
- Cupidopsis cissus (Godart, [1824])
- Cupidopsis jobates mauritanica Riley, 1932
- Pseudonacaduba aethiops (Mabille, 1877)
- Pseudonacaduba sichela (Wallengren, 1857)
- Lampides boeticus (Linnaeus, 1767)
- Uranothauma antinorii bamendanus Libert, 1993
- Uranothauma falkensteini (Dewitz, 1879)
- Uranothauma frederikkae Libert, 1993
- Uranothauma heritsia (Hewitson, 1876)
- Uranothauma nubifer (Trimen, 1895)
- Phlyaria cyara cyara (Hewitson, 1876)
- Phlyaria cyara stactalla Karsch, 1895
- Cacyreus audeoudi Stempffer, 1936
- Cacyreus lingeus (Stoll, 1782)
- Cacyreus virilis Stempffer, 1936
- Leptotes babaulti (Stempffer, 1935)
- Leptotes brevidentatus (Tite, 1958)
- Leptotes jeanneli (Stempffer, 1935)
- Leptotes pirithous (Linnaeus, 1767)
- Leptotes pulchra (Murray, 1874)
- Tuxentius carana carana (Hewitson, 1876)
- Tuxentius carana kontu (Karsch, 1893)
- Tuxentius cretosus nodieri (Oberthür, 1883)
- Tuxentius margaritaceus (Sharpe, 1892)
- Tarucus kiki Larsen, 1976
- Tarucus legrasi Stempffer, 1948
- Tarucus rosacea (Austaut, 1885)
- Tarucus theophrastus (Fabricius, 1793)
- Tarucus ungemachi Stempffer, 1942
- Zizeeria knysna (Trimen, 1862)
- Zizina antanossa (Mabille, 1877)
- Actizera lucida (Trimen, 1883)
- Zizula hylax (Fabricius, 1775)
- Azanus jesous (Guérin-Méneville, 1849)
- Azanus mirza (Plötz, 1880)
- Azanus moriqua (Wallengren, 1857)
- Azanus natalensis (Trimen & Bowker, 1887)
- Azanus ubaldus (Stoll, 1782)
- Azanus isis (Drury, 1773)
- Eicochrysops dudgeoni Riley, 1929
- Eicochrysops hippocrates (Fabricius, 1793)
- Euchrysops alberta (Butler, 1901)
- Euchrysops albistriata greenwoodi d'Abrera, 1980
- Euchrysops banyo Libert, 2001
- Euchrysops malathana (Boisduval, 1833)
- Euchrysops nilotica (Aurivillius, 1904)
- Euchrysops osiris (Hopffer, 1855)
- Euchrysops reducta Hulstaert, 1924
- Euchrysops sagba Libert, 1993
- Euchrysops sahelianus Libert, 2001
- Euchrysops subpallida Bethune-Baker, 1923
- Thermoniphas alberici (Dufrane, 1945)
- Thermoniphas fumosa Stempffer, 1952
- Thermoniphas micylus (Cramer, 1780)
- Thermoniphas togara (Plötz, 1880)
- Oboronia guessfeldti (Dewitz, 1879)
- Oboronia ornata (Mabille, 1890)
- Oboronia pseudopunctatus (Strand, 1912)
- Oboronia punctatus (Dewitz, 1879)
- Chilades eleusis (Demaison, 1888)
- Freyeria trochylus (Freyer, [1843])
- Lepidochrysops dunni Larsen & Collins, 2003 (endemic)
- Lepidochrysops parsimon (Fabricius, 1775)
- Lepidochrysops polydialecta (Bethune-Baker, [1923])
- Lepidochrysops quassi (Karsh, 1895)
- Lepidochrysops ringa Tite, 1959
- Lepidochrysops vera Tite, 1961 (endemic)
- Lepidochrysops victoriae occidentalis Libert & Collins, 2001

== Riodinidae ==
=== Nemeobiinae ===
- Abisara tantalus caerulea Carpenter & Jackson, 1950
- Abisara intermedia Aurivillius, 1895
- Abisara talantus Aurivillius, 1891
- Abisara rutherfordii Hewitson, 1874
- Abisara gerontes (Fabricius, 1781)
- Abisara rogersi Druce, 1878
- Abisara cameroonensis Callaghan, 2003
- Abisara neavei latifasciata Riley, 1932

== Nymphalidae ==
=== Libytheinae ===
- Libythea labdaca Westwood, 1851

=== Danainae ===
==== Danaini ====
- Danaus chrysippus alcippus (Cramer, 1777)
- Tirumala formosa morgeni (Honrath, 1892)
- Tirumala petiverana (Doubleday, 1847)
- Amauris niavius (Linnaeus, 1758)
- Amauris tartarea Mabille, 1876
- Amauris crawshayi camerunica Joicey & Talbot, 1925
- Amauris damocles (Fabricius, 1793)
- Amauris echeria occidentalis Schmidt, 1921
- Amauris hecate (Butler, 1866)
- Amauris vashti (Butler, 1869)

=== Satyrinae ===
==== Elymniini ====
- Elymniopsis bammakoo (Westwood, [1851])

==== Melanitini ====
- Gnophodes betsimena parmeno Doubleday, 1849
- Gnophodes chelys (Fabricius, 1793)
- Melanitis leda (Linnaeus, 1758)
- Melanitis libya Distant, 1882
- Aphysoneura scapulifascia occidentalis Joicey & Talbot, 1924

==== Satyrini ====
- Bicyclus analis (Aurivillius, 1895)
- Bicyclus angulosa (Butler, 1868)
- Bicyclus anisops (Karsch, 1892)
- Bicyclus auricruda fulgidus Fox, 1963
- Bicyclus buea (Strand, 1912)
- Bicyclus campus (Karsch, 1893)
- Bicyclus dorothea (Cramer, 1779)
- Bicyclus ephorus Weymer, 1892
- Bicyclus evadne elionias (Hewitson, 1866)
- Bicyclus golo (Aurivillius, 1893)
- Bicyclus graueri choveti Libert, 1996
- Bicyclus hewitsoni (Doumet, 1861)
- Bicyclus hyperanthus (Bethune-Baker, 1908)
- Bicyclus iccius (Hewitson, 1865)
- Bicyclus ignobilis ignobilis (Butler, 1870)
- Bicyclus ignobilis eurini Condamin & Fox, 1963
- Bicyclus istaris (Plötz, 1880)
- Bicyclus italus (Hewitson, 1865)
- Bicyclus madetes (Hewitson, 1874)
- Bicyclus mandanes Hewitson, 1873
- Bicyclus medontias (Hewitson, 1873)
- Bicyclus milyas (Hewitson, 1864)
- Bicyclus nobilis (Aurivillius, 1893)
- Bicyclus pavonis (Butler, 1876)
- Bicyclus procora (Karsch, 1893)
- Bicyclus rhacotis (Hewitson, 1866)
- Bicyclus safitza (Westwood, 1850)
- Bicyclus sambulos (Hewitson, 1877)
- Bicyclus martius sanaos (Hewitson, 1866)
- Bicyclus sandace (Hewitson, 1877)
- Bicyclus sangmelinae Condamin, 1963
- Bicyclus saussurei camerunia (Strand, 1914)
- Bicyclus sciathis (Hewitson, 1866)
- Bicyclus smithi (Aurivillius, 1899)
- Bicyclus sophrosyne (Plötz, 1880)
- Bicyclus sweadneri Fox, 1963
- Bicyclus sylvicolus Condamin, 1965
- Bicyclus taenias (Hewitson, 1877)
- Bicyclus technatis (Hewitson, 1877)
- Bicyclus trilophus jacksoni Condamin, 1961
- Bicyclus vulgaris (Butler, 1868)
- Bicyclus xeneas xeneas (Hewitson, 1866)
- Bicyclus xeneas occidentalis Condamin, 1965
- Bicyclus xeneoides Condamin, 1961
- Hallelesis asochis (Hewitson, 1866)
- Heteropsis peitho (Plötz, 1880)
- Ypthima albida occidentalis Bartel, 1905
- Ypthima antennata cornesi Kielland, 1982
- Ypthima asterope (Klug, 1832)
- Ypthima condamini nigeriae Kielland, 1982
- Ypthima doleta Kirby, 1880
- Ypthima impura Elwes & Edwards, 1893
- Ypthima pulchra Overlaet, 1954
- Ypthima pupillaris Butler, 1888
- Ypthima vuattouxi Kielland, 1982
- Ypthimomorpha itonia (Hewitson, 1865)

=== Charaxinae ===
==== Charaxini ====
- Charaxes varanes vologeses (Mabille, 1876)
- Charaxes fulvescens fulvescens (Aurivillius, 1891)
- Charaxes fulvescens senegala van Someren, 1975
- Charaxes obudoensis van Someren, 1969
- Charaxes candiope (Godart, 1824)
- Charaxes protoclea protoclea Feisthamel, 1850
- Charaxes protoclea protonothodes van Someren, 1971
- Charaxes boueti Feisthamel, 1850
- Charaxes cynthia cynthia Butler, 1866
- Charaxes cynthia kinduana Le Cerf, 1923
- Charaxes lucretius lucretius Cramer, [1775]
- Charaxes lucretius intermedius van Someren, 1971
- Charaxes lactetinctus Karsch, 1892
- Charaxes jasius Poulton, 1926
- Charaxes epijasius Reiche, 1850
- Charaxes legeri Plantrou, 1978
- Charaxes castor (Cramer, 1775)
- Charaxes brutus brutus (Cramer, 1779)
- Charaxes brutus angustus Rothschild, 1900
- Charaxes pollux (Cramer, 1775)
- Charaxes tectonis Jordan, 1937
- Charaxes eudoxus eudoxus (Drury, 1782)
- Charaxes eudoxus boersmana Plantrou, 1980
- Charaxes eudoxus mechowi Rothschild, 1900
- Charaxes numenes numenes (Hewitson, 1859)
- Charaxes numenes aequatorialis van Someren, 1972
- Charaxes tiridates tiridates (Cramer, 1777)
- Charaxes tiridates tiridatinus Röber, 1936
- Charaxes bipunctatus Rothschild, 1894
- Charaxes smaragdalis Butler, 1866
- Charaxes imperialis albipuncta Joicey & Talbot, 1920
- Charaxes ameliae ameliae Doumet, 1861
- Charaxes ameliae doumeti Henning, 1989
- Charaxes pythodoris knoopae Plantrou, 1982
- Charaxes pythodoris occidens van Someren, 1963
- Charaxes hadrianus Ward, 1871
- Charaxes lecerfi Lathy, 192
- Charaxes nobilis nobilis Druce, 1873
- Charaxes nobilis claudei le Moult, 1933
- Charaxes superbus Schultze, 1909
- Charaxes zingha (Stoll, 1780)
- Charaxes etesipe (Godart, 1824)
- Charaxes achaemenes monticola van Someren, 1970
- Charaxes eupale eupale (Drury, 1782)
- Charaxes eupale latimargo Joicey & Talbot, 1921
- Charaxes subornatus subornatus Schultze, 1916
- Charaxes subornatus couilloudi Plantrou, 1976
- Charaxes anticlea anticlea (Drury, 1782)
- Charaxes anticlea proadusta van Someren, 1971
- Charaxes hildebrandti hildebrandti (Dewitz, 1879)
- Charaxes hildebrandti gillesi Plantrou, 1973
- Charaxes virilis van Someren & Jackson, 1952
- Charaxes chevroti Collins & Larsen, 2005 (endemic)
- Charaxes catachrous van Someren & Jackson, 1952
- Charaxes etheocles etheocles (Cramer, 1777)
- Charaxes etheocles ochracea van Someren & Jackson, 1957
- Charaxes bocqueti oubanguiensis Minig, 1975
- Charaxes viola viola Butler, 1866
- Charaxes viola picta van Someren & Jackson, 1952
- Charaxes northcotti Rothschild, 1899
- Charaxes pleione pleione (Godart, 1824)
- Charaxes pleione congoensis Plantrou, 1989
- Charaxes paphianus paphianus Ward, 1871
- Charaxes paphianus falcata (Butler, 1872)
- Charaxes nichetes nichetes Grose-Smith, 1883
- Charaxes nichetes bouchei Plantrou, 1974
- Charaxes nichetes leopardinus Plantrou, 1974
- Charaxes lycurgus lycurgus (Fabricius, 1793)
- Charaxes lycurgus bernardiana Plantrou, 1978
- Charaxes zelica zelica Butler, 1869
- Charaxes zelica rougeoti Plantrou, 1978
- Charaxes porthos porthos Grose-Smith, 1883
- Charaxes porthos gallayi van Someren, 1968
- Charaxes doubledayi Aurivillius, 1899
- Charaxes mycerina mycerina (Godart, 1824)
- Charaxes mycerina nausicaa Staudinger, 1891

==== Euxanthini ====
- Charaxes eurinome (Cramer, 1775)
- Charaxes crossleyi (Ward, 1871)
- Charaxes trajanus (Ward, 1871)

==== Pallini ====
- Palla publius Staudinger, 1892
- Palla ussheri (Butler, 1870)
- Palla decius (Cramer, 1777)
- Palla violinitens violinitens (Crowley, 1890)
- Palla violinitens coniger (Butler, 1896)

=== Apaturinae ===
- Apaturopsis cleochares (Hewitson, 1873)

=== Nymphalinae ===
- Kallimoides rumia jadyae (Fox, 1968)
- Vanessula milca buechneri Dewitz, 1887

==== Nymphalini ====
- Antanartia delius (Drury, 1782)
- Vanessa dimorphica mortoni (Howarth, 1966)
- Vanessa cardui (Linnaeus, 1758)
- Junonia chorimene (Guérin-Méneville, 1844)
- Junonia hierta cebrene Trimen, 1870
- Junonia oenone (Linnaeus, 1758)
- Junonia orithya madagascariensis Guenée, 1865
- Junonia sophia (Fabricius, 1793)
- Junonia stygia (Aurivillius, 1894)
- Junonia gregorii Butler, 1896
- Junonia terea (Drury, 1773)
- Junonia westermanni Westwood, 1870
- Junonia cymodoce (Cramer, 1777)
- Salamis cacta (Fabricius, 1793)
- Protogoniomorpha anacardii (Linnaeus, 1758)
- Protogoniomorpha parhassus (Drury, 1782)
- Protogoniomorpha temora (Felder & Felder, 1867)
- Precis antilope (Feisthamel, 1850)
- Precis ceryne ceruana Rothschild & Jordan, 190
- Precis coelestina Dewitz, 1879
- Precis frobeniusi Strand, 1909
- Precis milonia Felder & Felder, 1867
- Precis octavia (Cramer, 1777)
- Precis pelarga (Fabricius, 1775)
- Precis rauana silvicola Schultz, 1916
- Precis sinuata Plötz, 1880
- Hypolimnas anthedon (Doubleday, 1845)
- Hypolimnas chapmani (Hewitson, 1873)
- Hypolimnas dinarcha (Hewitson, 1865)
- Hypolimnas misippus (Linnaeus, 1764)
- Hypolimnas monteironis (Druce, 1874)
- Hypolimnas salmacis (Drury, 1773)
- Catacroptera cloanthe ligata Rothschild & Jordan, 1903

=== Cyrestinae ===
==== Cyrestini ====
- Cyrestis camillus (Fabricius, 1781)

=== Biblidinae ===
==== Biblidini ====
- Byblia anvatara crameri Aurivillius, 1894
- Byblia ilithyia (Drury, 1773)
- Mesoxantha ethosea ethoseoides Rebel, 1914
- Ariadne actisanes (Hewitson, 1875)
- Ariadne albifascia (Joicey & Talbot, 1921)
- Ariadne enotrea (Cramer, 1779)
- Ariadne pagenstecheri (Suffert, 1904)
- Neptidopsis ophione (Cramer, 1777)
- Eurytela alinda Mabille, 1893
- Eurytela dryope (Cramer, [1775])
- Eurytela hiarbas (Drury, 1782)

==== Epicaliini ====
- Sevenia amulia (Cramer, 1777)
- Sevenia boisduvali omissa (Rothschild, 1918)
- Sevenia garega (Karsch, 1892)
- Sevenia occidentalium (Mabille, 1876)
- Sevenia pechueli sangbae (Hecq & Peeters, 1992)
- Sevenia umbrina (Karsch, 1892)

=== Limenitinae ===
==== Limenitidini ====
- Harma theobene theobene Doubleday, 1848
- Harma theobene superna (Fox, 1968)
- Cymothoe althea bobi Collins & Larsen, 2000
- Cymothoe anitorgis (Hewitson, 1874)
- Cymothoe aramis (Hewitson, 1865)
- Cymothoe beckeri (Herrich-Schaeffer, 1858)
- Cymothoe caenis (Drury, 1773)
- Cymothoe capella (Ward, 1871)
- Cymothoe coccinata (Hewitson, 1874)
- Cymothoe consanguis Aurivillius, 1896
- Cymothoe egesta (Cramer, 1775)
- Cymothoe confusa Aurivillius, 1887
- Cymothoe euthalioides euthalioides Kirby, 1889
- Cymothoe euthalioides albomarginata Neustetter, 1921
- Cymothoe excelsa Neustetter, 1912
- Cymothoe fumana balluca Fox & Howarth, 1968
- Cymothoe haimodia (Grose-Smith, 1887)
- Cymothoe harmilla (Hewitson, 1874)
- Cymothoe heliada (Hewitson, 1874)
- Cymothoe herminia (Grose-Smith, 1887)
- Cymothoe hesiodina Schultze, 1908
- Cymothoe hesiodotus nigeriensis Overlaet, 1952
- Cymothoe hyarbita (Hewitson, 1866)
- Cymothoe hypatha hypatha (Hewitson, 1866)
- Cymothoe hypatha okomu Hecq & Larsen, 1997
- Cymothoe indamora (Hewitson, 1866)
- Cymothoe jodutta ciceronis (Ward, 1871)
- Cymothoe lucasii binotorum Darge, 1985
- Cymothoe lurida hesione Weymer, 1907
- Cymothoe oemilius (Doumet, 1859)
- Cymothoe ogova (Plötz, 1880)
- Cymothoe orphnina suavis Schultze, 1913
- Cymothoe preussi Staudinger, 1890
- Cymothoe reinholdi (Plötz, 1880)
- Cymothoe sangaris (Godart, 1824)
- Cymothoe weymeri Suffert, 1904
- Cymothoe zenkeri Richelmann, 1913
- Pseudoneptis bugandensis ianthe Hemming, 1964
- Pseudacraea annakae Knoop, 1988
- Pseudacraea boisduvalii (Doubleday, 1845)
- Pseudacraea clarkii Butler & Rothschild, 1892
- Pseudacraea dolomena (Hewitson, 1865)
- Pseudacraea rubrobasalis Aurivillius, 1903
- Pseudacraea eurytus (Linnaeus, 1758)
- Pseudacraea kuenowii gottbergi Dewitz, 1884
- Pseudacraea lucretia (Cramer, [1775])
- Pseudacraea semire (Cramer, 1779)
- Pseudacraea warburgi Aurivillius, 1892

==== Neptidini ====
- Neptis agouale Pierre-Baltus, 1978
- Neptis alta Overlaet, 1955
- Neptis biafra Ward, 1871
- Neptis camarensis Schultze, 1920
- Neptis carlsbergi Collins & Larsen, 2005 (endemic)
- Neptis claude Collins & Larsen, 2005
- Neptis conspicua Neave, 1904
- Neptis constantiae kaumba Condamin, 1966
- Neptis loma Condamin, 1971
- Neptis continuata Holland, 1892
- Neptis jamesoni Godman & Salvin, 1890
- Neptis kiriakoffi Overlaet, 1955
- Neptis laeta Overlaet, 1955
- Neptis liberti Pierre & Pierre-Baltus, 1998
- Neptis melicerta (Drury, 1773)
- Neptis metanira Holland, 1892
- Neptis metella (Doubleday, 1848)
- Neptis mixophyes Holland, 1892
- Neptis morosa Overlaet, 1955
- Neptis nebrodes Hewitson, 1874
- Neptis nemetes Hewitson, 1868
- Neptis nicobule Holland, 1892
- Neptis nicomedes Hewitson, 1874
- Neptis quintilla Mabille, 1890
- Neptis nicoteles Hewitson, 1874
- Neptis nysiades Hewitson, 1868
- Neptis occidentalis batesii Hall, 1930
- Neptis ochracea mildbraedi Gaede, 1915
- Neptis paula Staudinger, 1896
- Neptis puella Aurivillius, 1894
- Neptis saclava marpessa Hopffer, 1855
- Neptis seeldrayersi Aurivillius, 1895
- Neptis serena Overlaet, 1955
- Neptis strigata Aurivillius, 1894
- Neptis trigonophora melicertula Strand, 1912
- Neptis troundi Pierre-Baltus, 1978

==== Adoliadini ====
- Catuna angustatum (Felder & Felder, 1867)
- Catuna crithea (Drury, 1773)
- Catuna oberthueri Karsch, 1894
- Euryphura chalcis (Felder & Felder, 1860)
- Euryphura isuka Stoneham, 1935
- Euryphura plautilla (Hewitson, 1865)
- Euryphura porphyrion (Ward, 1871)
- Euryphura togoensis Suffert, 1904
- Euryphurana nobilis (Staudinger, 1891)
- Harmilla elegans Aurivillius, 1892
- Hamanumida daedalus (Fabricius, 1775)
- Pseudargynnis hegemone (Godart, 1819)
- Aterica galene (Brown, 1776)
- Cynandra opis (Drury, 1773)
- Euriphene anaxibia Hecq, 1997
- Euriphene abasa (Hewitson, 1866)
- Euriphene amicia (Hewitson, 1871)
- Euriphene ampedusa (Hewitson, 1866)
- Euriphene aridatha (Hewitson, 1866)
- Euriphene atossa (Hewitson, 1865)
- Euriphene atropurpurea (Aurivillius, 1894)
- Euriphene atrovirens (Mabille, 1878)
- Euriphene barombina (Aurivillius, 1894)
- Euriphene coerulea Boisduval, 1847
- Euriphene duseni legeriana Hecq, 1987
- Euriphene ernestibaumanni (Karsch, 1895)
- Euriphene gambiae gabonica Bernardi, 1966
- Euriphene glaucopis (Gaede, 1916)
- Euriphene goniogramma (Karsch, 1894)
- Euriphene grosesmithi (Staudinger, 1891)
- Euriphene incerta (Aurivillius, 1912)
- Euriphene karschi (Aurivillius, 1894)
- Euriphene kiki Bernardi & Larsen, 1980 (endemic)
- Euriphene milnei (Hewitson, 1865)
- Euriphene mundula (Grünberg, 1910)
- Euriphene obani Wojtusiak & Knoop, 1994
- Euriphene obtusangula (Aurivillius, 1912)
- Euriphene pavo (Howarth, 1959)
- Euriphene plagiata (Aurivillius, 1897)
- Euriphene bernaudi Hecq, 1994
- Euriphene tadema (Hewitson, 1866)
- Euriphene doriclea (Drury, 1782)
- Euriphene lysandra (Stoll, 1790)
- Euriphene paralysandra d'Abrera, 2004 (endemic)
- Bebearia denticula Hecq, 2000 (endemic)
- Bebearia lucayensis Hecq, 1996
- Bebearia tentyris (Hewitson, 1866)
- Bebearia carshena (Hewitson, 1871)
- Bebearia absolon (Fabricius, 1793)
- Bebearia micans (Aurivillius, 1899)
- Bebearia zonara (Butler, 1871)
- Bebearia mandinga (Felder & Felder, 1860)
- Bebearia oxione (Hewitson, 1866)
- Bebearia abesa (Hewitson, 1869)
- Bebearia barce maculata (Aurivillius, 1912)
- Bebearia comus (Ward, 1871)
- Bebearia mardania (Fabricius, 1793)
- Bebearia cocalioides hecqi Holmes, 2001
- Bebearia guineensis (Felder & Felder, 1867)
- Bebearia cocalia continentalis Hecq, 1988
- Bebearia cocalia katera (van Someren, 1939)
- Bebearia paludicola Holmes, 2001
- Bebearia sophus (Fabricius, 1793)
- Bebearia staudingeri okomu Collins & Larsen, 2008
- Bebearia plistonax (Hewitson, 1874)
- Bebearia elpinice (Hewitson, 1869)
- Bebearia occitana Hecq, 1989
- Bebearia phranza (Hewitson, 1865)
- Bebearia laetitia (Plötz, 1880)
- Bebearia flaminia flaminia (Staudinger, 1891)
- Bebearia flaminia leventisi Hecq & Larsen, 1997
- Bebearia maximiana (Staudinger, 1891)
- Bebearia omo Larsen & Warren, 2005
- Bebearia nivaria (Ward, 1871)
- Bebearia phantasia (Hewitson, 1865)
- Bebearia phantasina (Staudinger, 1891)
- Bebearia phantasiella (Staudinger, 1891)
- Bebearia demetra (Godart, 1824)
- Bebearia maledicta (Strand, 1912)
- Bebearia tessmanni innocuoides Hecq, 2000
- Bebearia cutteri (Hewitson, 1865)
- Bebearia innocua (Grose-Smith & Kirby, 1889)
- Bebearia eliensis scrutata Hecq, 1989
- Bebearia barombina (Staudinger, 1896)
- Bebearia octogramma (Grose-Smith & Kirby, 1889)
- Bebearia fontaineana vinula Hecq, 1987
- Euphaedra luperca (Hewitson, 1864)
- Euphaedra fucora Hecq, 1979
- Euphaedra imperialis gabonica Rothschild, 1918
- Euphaedra imperialis hecqui Darge, 1974
- Euphaedra medon (Linnaeus, 1763)
- Euphaedra athena Hecq & Joly, 2003 (endemic)
- Euphaedra extensa Hecq, 1981
- Euphaedra zaddachii elephantina Staudinger, 1891
- Euphaedra xypete (Hewitson, 1865)
- Euphaedra hewitsoni sumptuosa Hecq, 1974
- Euphaedra acuta Hecq, 1977
- Euphaedra diffusa diffusa Gaede, 1916
- Euphaedra diffusa albocoerulea Hecq, 1976
- Euphaedra mirabilis Hecq, 1980
- Euphaedra crossei Sharpe, 1902
- Euphaedra imitans Holland, 1893
- Euphaedra cyparissa aurata Carpenter, 1895
- Euphaedra sarcoptera (Butler, 1871)
- Euphaedra themis (Hübner, 1807)
- Euphaedra permixtum diva Hecq, 1982
- Euphaedra aureola nitens Hecq, 1997
- Euphaedra exerrata Hecq, 1982
- Euphaedra janetta (Butler, 1871)
- Euphaedra splendens Hecq, 1992
- Euphaedra justicia Staudinger, 1886
- Euphaedra adonina (Hewitson, 1865)
- Euphaedra controversa Hecq, 1997
- Euphaedra ceres lutescens Hecq, 1979
- Euphaedra phaethusa (Butler, 1866)
- Euphaedra viridicaerulea Bartel, 1905
- Euphaedra ravola (Hewitson, 1866)
- Euphaedra margaritifera Schultze, 1920
- Euphaedra preussiana protea Hecq, 1983
- Euphaedra rezia (Hewitson, 1866)
- Euphaedra proserpina Hecq, 1983
- Euphaedra nigrocilia Lathy, 1903 (endemic)
- Euphaedra wojtusiaki Hecq, 1993 (endemic)
- Euphaedra luteolucens Hecq, 1995 (endemic)
- Euphaedra knoopiana Hecq, 1995 (endemic)
- Euphaedra dargeana Hecq, 1980
- Euphaedra demeter Hecq, 1983
- Euphaedra velutina Hecq, 1997
- Euphaedra densamacula Hecq, 1997
- Euphaedra compacta Hecq, 1997
- Euphaedra vicina longiqua Hecq, 1984
- Euphaedra eleus (Drury, 1782)
- Euphaedra simplex Hecq, 1978
- Euphaedra ferruginea Staudinger, 1886
- Euphaedra semipreussiana Hecq, 1993
- Euphaedra castanoides gashaka Hecq, 1996
- Euphaedra edwardsii (van der Hoeven, 1845)
- Euphaedra ruspina (Hewitson, 1865)
- Euphaedra harpalyce harpalyce (Cramer, 1777)
- Euphaedra harpalyce evanescens Hecq, 1995
- Euphaedra losinga losinga (Hewitson, 1864)
- Euphaedra losinga wardi (Druce, 1874)
- Euphaedra losinga knoopi Hecq, 1988
- Euphaedra viridirupta Hecq, 2007
- Euphaedra larseni Hecq, 2005 (endemic)
- Euphaedra mambili Hecq, 2001
- Euptera amieti Collins & Libert, 1998
- Euptera crowleyi (Kirby, 1889)
- Euptera elabontas (Hewitson, 1871)
- Euptera hirundo Staudinger, 1891
- Euptera knoopi Libert & Chovet, 1998 (endemic)
- Euptera mimetica Collins & Amiet, 1998
- Euptera neptunus Joicey & Talbot, 1924
- Euptera nigeriensis Chovet, 1998 (endemic)
- Euptera pluto (Ward, 1873)
- Euptera zowa Fox, 1965
- Pseudathyma callina (Grose-Smith, 1898)
- Pseudathyma falcata Jackson, 1969
- Pseudathyma legeri Larsen & Boorman, 1995 (endemic)
- Pseudathyma martini Collins, 2002
- Pseudathyma plutonica sibyllina (Staudinger, 1890)

=== Heliconiinae ===
==== Acraeini ====
- Acraea kraka Aurivillius, 1893
- Acraea admatha Hewitson, 1865
- Acraea camaena (Drury, 1773)
- Acraea endoscota Le Doux, 1928
- Acraea eugenia Karsch, 1893
- Acraea leucographa Ribbe, 1889
- Acraea neobule Doubleday, 1847
- Acraea quirina (Fabricius, 1781)
- Acraea zetes (Linnaeus, 1758)
- Acraea abdera abdera Hewitson, 1852
- Acraea abdera eginopsis Aurivillius, 1899
- Acraea cepheus (Linnaeus, 1758)
- Acraea egina (Cramer, 1775)
- Acraea caecilia (Fabricius, 1781)
- Acraea pseudegina Westwood, 1852
- Acraea rogersi Hewitson, 1873
- Acraea sykesi Sharpe, 1902
- Acraea alcinoe Felder & Felder, 1865
- Acraea consanguinea (Aurivillius, 1893)
- Acraea elongata (Butler, 1874)
- Acraea epaea (Cramer, 1779)
- Acraea epiprotea (Butler, 1874)
- Acraea excisa (Butler, 1874)
- Acraea obliqua (Aurivillius, 1913)
- Acraea tellus (Aurivillius, 1893)
- Acraea umbra (Drury, 1782)
- Acraea vestalis Felder & Felder, 1865
- Acraea acerata Hewitson, 1874
- Acraea actinotina (Lathy, 1903) (endemic)
- Acraea alciope Hewitson, 1852
- Acraea pseudepaea Dudgeon, 1909
- Acraea aurivillii Staudinger, 1896
- Acraea bonasia (Fabricius, 1775)
- Acraea circeis (Drury, 1782)
- Acraea encedana Pierre, 1976
- Acraea encedon (Linnaeus, 1758)
- Acraea serena (Fabricius, 1775)
- Acraea iturina Grose-Smith, 1890
- Acraea jodutta (Fabricius, 1793)
- Acraea lycoa Godart, 1819
- Acraea oberthueri Butler, 1895
- Acraea orestia Hewitson, 1874
- Acraea peneleos Ward, 1871
- Acraea polis Pierre, 1999
- Acraea pharsalus Ward, 1871
- Acraea karschi Aurivillius, 1899
- Acraea uvui balina Karsch, 1892
- Acraea vesperalis Grose-Smith, 1890
- Acraea viviana Staudinger, 1896
- Acraea kaduna Pierre, 1993 (endemic)
- Acraea alticola Schultze, 1923
- Acraea oreas oboti Collins & Larsen, 2000
- Acraea orina Hewitson, 1874
- Acraea parrhasia parrhasia (Fabricius, 1793)
- Acraea parrhasia servona Godart, 1819
- Acraea penelope Staudinger, 1896
- Acraea translucida Eltringham, 1912
- Acraea perenna Doubleday, 1847

==== Argynnini ====
- Issoria baumanni excelsior (Butler, 1896)

==== Vagrantini ====
- Lachnoptera anticlia (Hübner, 1819)
- Phalanta eurytis (Doubleday, 1847)
- Phalanta phalantha aethiopica (Rothschild & Jordan, 1903)

== Hesperiidae ==
=== Coeliadinae ===
- Coeliades bixana Evans, 1940
- Coeliades chalybe (Westwood, 1852)
- Coeliades forestan (Stoll, [1782])
- Coeliades hanno (Plötz, 1879)
- Coeliades libeon (Druce, 1875)
- Coeliades pisistratus (Fabricius, 1793)
- Pyrrhochalcia iphis (Drury, 1773)

=== Pyrginae ===
==== Celaenorrhinini ====
- Loxolexis dimidia (Holland, 1896)
- Loxolexis hollandi (Druce, 1909)
- Loxolexis holocausta (Mabille, 1891)
- Katreus johnstoni (Butler, 1888)
- Celaenorrhinus bettoni Butler, 1902
- Celaenorrhinus boadicea (Hewitson, 1877)
- Celaenorrhinus chrysoglossa (Mabille, 1891)
- Celaenorrhinus galenus (Fabricius, 1793)
- Celaenorrhinus illustris (Mabille, 1891)
- Celaenorrhinus meditrina (Hewitson, 1877)
- Celaenorrhinus ovalis Evans, 1937
- Celaenorrhinus perlustris mona Evans, 1937
- Celaenorrhinus plagiatus Berger, 1976
- Celaenorrhinus pooanus Aurivillius, 1910
- Celaenorrhinus proxima maesseni Berger, 1976
- Celaenorrhinus rutilans (Mabille, 1877)
- Eretis lugens (Rogenhofer, 1891)
- Eretis melania Mabille, 1891
- Eretis plistonicus (Plötz, 1879)
- Sarangesa bouvieri (Mabille, 1877)
- Sarangesa brigida (Plötz, 1879)
- Sarangesa laelius (Mabille, 1877)
- Sarangesa majorella (Mabille, 1891)
- Sarangesa phidyle (Walker, 1870)
- Sarangesa tertullianus (Fabricius, 1793)
- Sarangesa thecla (Plötz, 1879)

==== Tagiadini ====
- Tagiades flesus (Fabricius, 1781)
- Eagris decastigma decastigma Mabille, 1891
- Eagris decastigma fuscosa (Holland, 1893)
- Eagris denuba (Plötz, 1879)
- Eagris hereus quaterna (Mabille, 1890)
- Eagris subalbida (Holland, 1893)
- Eagris tetrastigma tetrastigma (Mabille, 1891)
- Eagris tetrastigma subolivescens (Holland, 1892)
- Eagris tigris liberti Collins & Larsen, 2005
- Calleagris lacteus lacteus (Mabille, 1877)
- Calleagris lacteus dannatti (Ehrmann, 1893)
- Calleagris landbecki (Druce, 1910)
- Procampta rara Holland, 1892
- Caprona adelica Karsch, 1892
- Caprona pillaana Wallengren, 1857
- Netrobalane canopus (Trimen, 1864)
- Abantis bismarcki Karsch, 1892
- Abantis elegantula (Mabille, 1890)
- Abantis leucogaster (Mabille, 1890)
- Abantis lucretia Druce, 1909
- Abantis nigeriana Butler, 1901
- Abantis paradisea (Butler, 1870)
- Abantis pseudonigeriana Usher, 1984
- Abantis rubra Holland, 1920

==== Carcharodini ====
- Spialia diomus (Hopffer, 1855)
- Spialia dromus (Plötz, 1884)
- Spialia spio (Linnaeus, 1764)
- Gomalia elma (Trimen, 1862)

=== Hesperiinae ===
==== Aeromachini ====
- Astictopterus abjecta (Snellen, 1872)
- Prosopalpus debilis (Plötz, 1879)
- Prosopalpus styla Evans, 1937
- Kedestes callicles (Hewitson, 1868)
- Kedestes protensa Butler, 1901
- Gorgyra aburae (Plötz, 1879)
- Gorgyra afikpo Druce, 1909
- Gorgyra aretina (Hewitson, 1878)
- Gorgyra bina Evans, 1937
- Gorgyra warreni Collins & Larsen, 2008
- Gorgyra bule Miller, 1964
- Gorgyra diversata Evans, 1937
- Gorgyra heterochrus (Mabille, 1890)
- Gorgyra kalinzu Evans, 1949
- Gorgyra minima Holland, 1896
- Gorgyra mocquerysii Holland, 1896
- Gorgyra pali Evans, 1937
- Gorgyra rubescens Holland, 1896
- Gorgyra sara Evans, 1937
- Gorgyra sola Evans, 1937
- Gorgyra subfacatus (Mabille, 1890)
- Gyrogra subnotata (Holland, 1894)
- Teniorhinus ignita (Mabille, 1877)
- Teniorhinus watsoni Holland, 1892
- Ceratrichia argyrosticta (Plötz, 1879)
- Ceratrichia clara Evans, 1937
- Ceratrichia flava Hewitson, 1878
- Ceratrichia lewisi Collins & Larsen, 2000 (endemic)
- Ceratrichia nothus enantia (Karsch, 1893)
- Ceratrichia nothus makomensis Strand, 1913
- Ceratrichia phocion (Fabricius, 1781)
- Ceratrichia semilutea Mabille, 1891
- Pardaleodes edipus (Stoll, 1781)
- Pardaleodes fan (Holland, 1894)
- Pardaleodes incerta murcia (Plötz, 1883)
- Pardaleodes sator (Westwood, 1852)
- Pardaleodes tibullus (Fabricius, 1793)
- Pardaleodes xanthopeplus Holland, 1892
- Xanthodisca astrape (Holland, 1892)
- Xanthodisca rega (Mabille, 1890)
- Acada annulifer (Holland, 1892)
- Rhabdomantis galatia (Hewitson, 1868)
- Rhabdomantis sosia (Mabille, 1891)
- Osmodes adon (Mabille, 1890)
- Osmodes adonia Evans, 1937
- Osmodes adosus (Mabille, 1890)
- Osmodes costatus Aurivillius, 1896
- Osmodes distincta Holland, 1896
- Osmodes hollandi Evans, 1937
- Osmodes laronia (Hewitson, 1868)
- Osmodes lindseyi Miller, 1964
- Osmodes lux Holland, 1892
- Osmodes omar Swinhoe, 1916
- Osmodes thora (Plötz, 1884)
- Parosmodes lentiginosa (Holland, 1896)
- Parosmodes morantii axis Evans, 1937
- Paracleros biguttulus (Mabille, 1890)
- Paracleros maesseni Berger, 1978
- Paracleros substrigata (Holland, 1893)
- Osphantes ogowena (Mabille, 1891)
- Acleros mackenii olaus (Plötz, 1884)
- Acleros nigrapex Strand, 1913
- Acleros ploetzi Mabille, 1890
- Semalea arela (Mabille, 1891)
- Semalea atrio (Mabille, 1891)
- Semalea kola Evans, 1937
- Semalea pulvina (Plötz, 1879)
- Semalea sextilis (Plötz, 1886)
- Hypoleucis sophia Evans, 1937
- Hypoleucis tripunctata truda Evans, 1937
- Meza banda (Evans, 1937)
- Meza cybeutes cybeutes (Holland, 1894)
- Meza cybeutes volta Miller, 1971
- Meza elba (Evans, 1937)
- Meza indusiata (Mabille, 1891)
- Meza leucophaea (Holland, 1894)
- Meza mabillei (Holland, 1893)
- Meza meza (Hewitson, 1877)
- Paronymus budonga (Evans, 1938)
- Paronymus nevea (Druce, 1910)
- Paronymus xanthias (Mabille, 1891)
- Paronymus xanthioides (Holland, 1892)
- Andronymus caesar (Fabricius, 1793)
- Andronymus evander (Mabille, 1890)
- Andronymus gander Evans, 1947
- Andronymus helles Evans, 1937
- Andronymus hero Evans, 1937
- Andronymus neander (Plötz, 1884)
- Chondrolepis nero Evans, 1937
- Chondrolepis niveicornis (Plötz, 1883)
- Zophopetes cerymica (Hewitson, 1867)
- Zophopetes ganda Evans, 1937
- Gamia buchholzi (Plötz, 1879)
- Gamia shelleyi (Sharpe, 1890)
- Artitropa comus (Stoll, 1782)
- Mopala orma (Plötz, 1879)
- Gretna balenge (Holland, 1891)
- Gretna cylinda (Hewitson, 1876)
- Gretna lacida (Hewitson, 1876)
- Gretna waga (Plötz, 1886)
- Gretna zaremba (Plötz, 1884)
- Pteroteinon caenira (Hewitson, 1867)
- Pteroteinon capronnieri (Plötz, 1879)
- Pteroteinon ceucaenira (Druce, 1910)
- Pteroteinon concaenira Belcastro & Larsen, 1996
- Pteroteinon iricolor (Holland, 1890)
- Pteroteinon laterculus (Holland, 1890)
- Pteroteinon laufella (Hewitson, 1868)
- Pteroteinon pruna Evans, 1937
- Leona binoevatus (Mabille, 1891)
- Leona maracanda (Hewitson, 1876)
- Leona lena Evans, 1937
- Leona leonora (Plötz, 1879)
- Leona meloui (Riley, 1926)
- Leona halma Evans, 1937
- Leona lissa Evans, 1937
- Leona luehderi (Plötz, 1879)
- Caenides soritia (Hewitson, 1876)
- Caenides kangvensis Holland, 1896
- Caenides benga (Holland, 1891)
- Caenides otilia Belcastro, 1990
- Caenides dacenilla Aurivillius, 1925
- Caenides dacela (Hewitson, 1876)
- Caenides hidaroides Aurivillius, 1896
- Caenides dacena (Hewitson, 1876)
- Monza alberti (Holland, 1896)
- Monza cretacea (Snellen, 1872)
- Melphina flavina Lindsey & Miller, 1965
- Melphina malthina (Hewitson, 1876)
- Melphina melphis (Holland, 1893)
- Melphina noctula (Druce, 1909)
- Melphina statira (Mabille, 1891)
- Melphina tarace (Mabille, 1891)
- Melphina unistriga (Holland, 1893)
- Fresna carlo Evans, 1937
- Fresna cojo (Karsch, 1893)
- Fresna netopha (Hewitson, 1878)
- Fresna nyassae (Hewitson, 1878)
- Platylesches affinissima Strand, 1921
- Platylesches batangae (Holland, 1894)
- Platylesches chamaeleon (Mabille, 1891)
- Platylesches galesa (Hewitson, 1877)
- Platylesches iva Evans, 1937
- Platylesches langa Evans, 1937
- Platylesches moritili (Wallengren, 1857)
- Platylesches picanini (Holland, 1894)

==== Baorini ====
- Zenonia zeno (Trimen, 1864)
- Pelopidas mathias (Fabricius, 1798)
- Pelopidas thrax (Hübner, 1821)
- Borbo binga (Evans, 1937)
- Borbo borbonica (Boisduval, 1833)
- Borbo fallax (Gaede, 1916)
- Borbo fanta (Evans, 1937)
- Borbo fatuellus (Hopffer, 1855)
- Borbo gemella (Mabille, 1884)
- Borbo holtzi (Plötz, 1883)
- Borbo micans (Holland, 1896)
- Borbo perobscura (Druce, 1912)
- Parnara monasi (Trimen & Bowker, 1889)
- Gegenes hottentota (Latreille, 1824)
- Gegenes niso brevicornis (Plötz, 1884)
- Gegenes pumilio gambica (Mabille, 1878)

=== Heteropterinae ===
- Metisella kambove gamma de Jong
- Metisella kumbona Evans, 1937
- Metisella medea Evans, 1937
- Metisella midas malda Evans, 1937
- Metisella tsadicus (Aurivillius, 1905)
- Lepella lepeletier (Latreille, 1824)

== See also ==
- List of moths of Nigeria
- Wildlife of Nigeria
