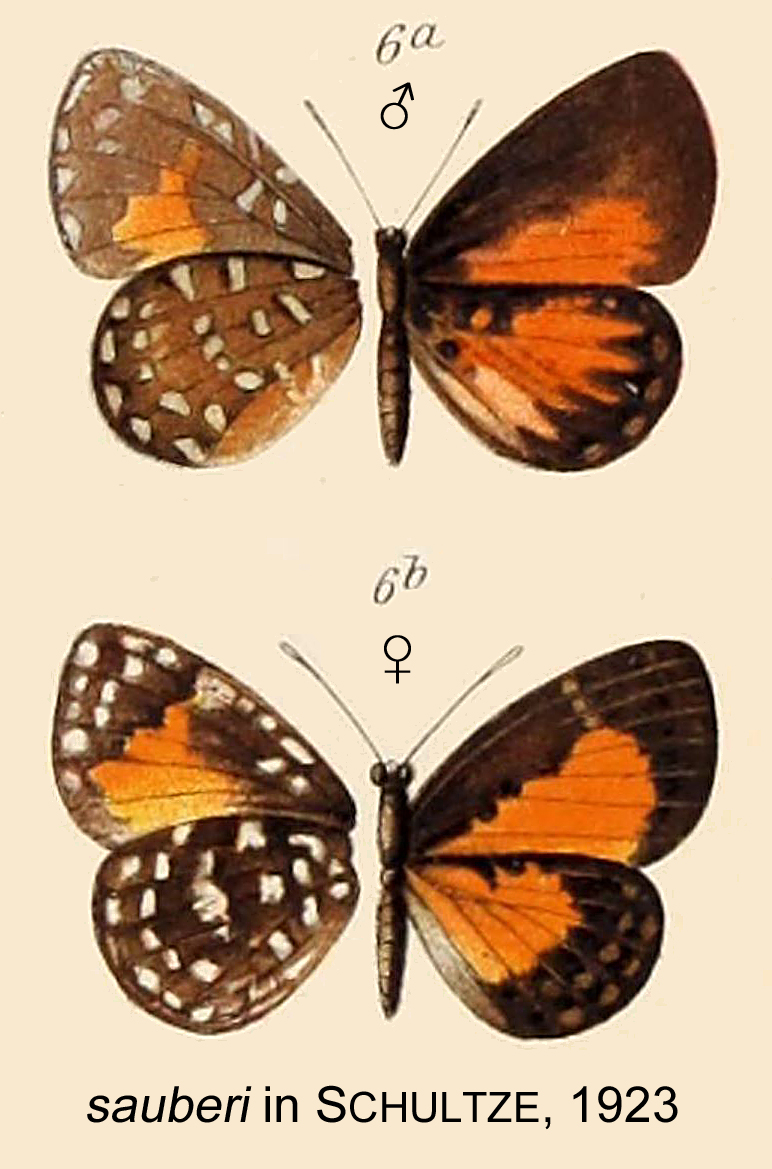

Scientific classification
- Kingdom: Animalia
- Phylum: Arthropoda
- Class: Insecta
- Order: Lepidoptera
- Family: Lycaenidae
- Genus: Liptena
- Species: L. sauberi

Binomial name
- Liptena sauberi Schultze, 1912

= Liptena sauberi =

Species of butterfly

Liptena sauberi is a butterfly in the family Lycaenidae. It is found in Cameroon and possibly Nigeria.

== See also ==
- List of butterflies of Nigeria
