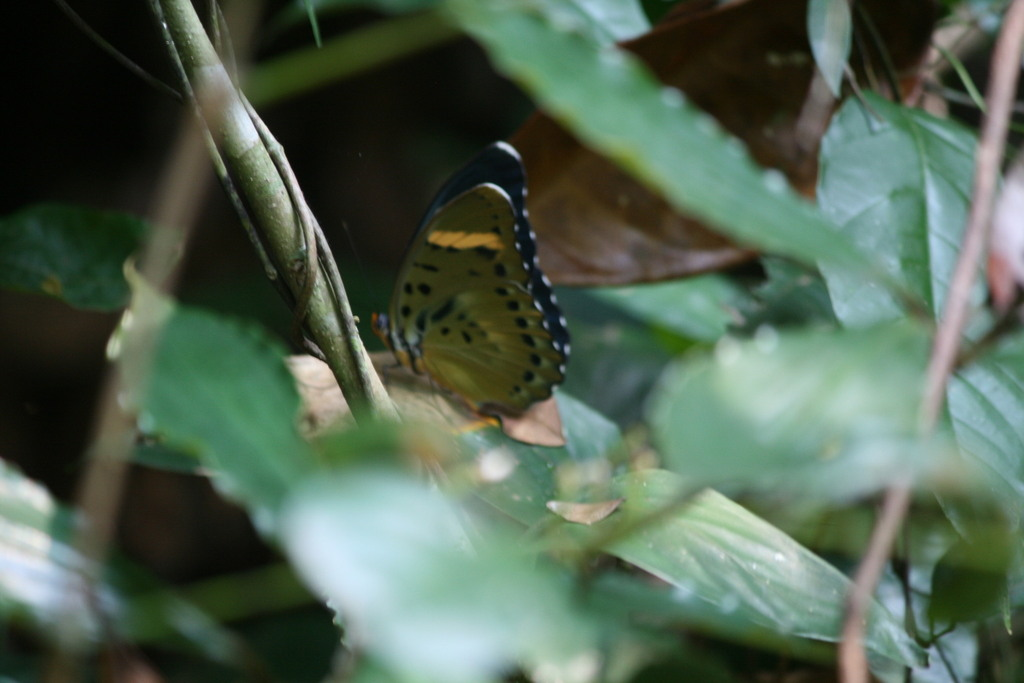

Scientific classification
- Kingdom: Animalia
- Phylum: Arthropoda
- Class: Insecta
- Order: Lepidoptera
- Family: Nymphalidae
- Genus: Euphaedra
- Species: E. preussiana

Binomial name
- Euphaedra preussiana Gaede, 1916

Synonyms
- Euphaedra (Euphaedrana) preussiana; Euphaedra × mendax Schultze, 1920 (hybrid of E. ravola and E. eleus); Euphaedra mendax Hecq, 1983; Euphaedra protea Hecq, 1983; Euphaedra mendax robusta Hecq, 1983

= Euphaedra preussiana =

Species of butterfly

Euphaedra preussiana, or Preuss' Ceres forester, is a butterfly in the family Nymphalidae. It is found in Nigeria and from Cameroon to the Democratic Republic of the Congo.

== Subspecies ==
- Euphaedra preussiana preussiana (Cameroon, Democratic Republic of the Congo)
- Euphaedra preussiana protea Hecq, 1983 (south-eastern Nigeria, western Cameroon)
- Euphaedra preussiana robusta Hecq, 1983 (western Democratic Republic of the Congo)
