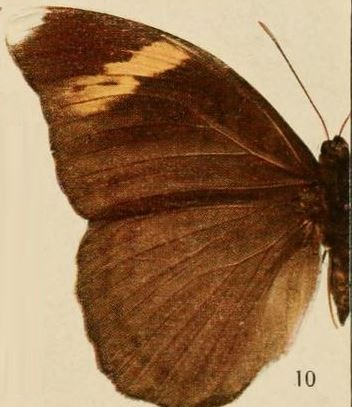

Scientific classification
- Kingdom: Animalia
- Phylum: Arthropoda
- Class: Insecta
- Order: Lepidoptera
- Family: Nymphalidae
- Genus: Bebearia
- Species: B. maximiana

Binomial name
- Bebearia maximiana (Staudinger, 1891)

Synonyms
- Euryphene maximiana Staudinger, 1891; Bebearia (Bebearia) maximiana; Euryphene aurora f. eos Röber, 1936; Euryphene maximiniana Holland, 1920

= Bebearia maximiana =

Species of butterfly

Bebearia maximiana, the maximal forester, is a butterfly in the family Nymphalidae. It is found in Nigeria, Cameroon, Gabon and the Democratic Republic of the Congo. The habitat consists of forests.

Seitz- E. maximiana Stgr. is a very similar [to] Bebearia flaminia, but somewhat larger species, of which a few specimens were captured by Dr. Preuss at the Barombi Station in the Cameroons and which is very little known as yet.

The larvae feed on an unidentified dicotyledonous tree.

== Subspecies ==
- Bebearia maximiana maximiana (Nigeria: Cross River loop, Cameroon, Democratic Republic of the Congo: Ubangi, Mongala, Uele, northern Kivu and Lualaba)
- Bebearia maximiana ata Hecq, 1990 (Gabon)
