= Charaxes chevroti =

Scientific classification
- Domain: Eukaryota
- Kingdom: Animalia
- Phylum: Arthropoda
- Class: Insecta
- Order: Lepidoptera
- Family: Nymphalidae
- Genus: Charaxes
- Species: C. chevroti

Binomial name
- Charaxes chevroti Collins & Larsen, 2005

Species of butterfly

Charaxes chevroti, the Kagoro demon charaxes, is a butterfly in the family Nymphalidae. It is found in north-central Nigeria. The habitat consists of forests. Known only from the holotype and paratypes. The male is slightly larger than Charaxes etheocles Cramer, 1777 and the shape of forewing is slightly broader. There is no metallic sheen on the upperside (cf. Charaxes virilis, Charaxes cedreatis).

== Etymology ==
The species is named for Jean-Claude Chevrot, who collected extensively in the Kagoro Forest (the type location of the species) around 1980.
