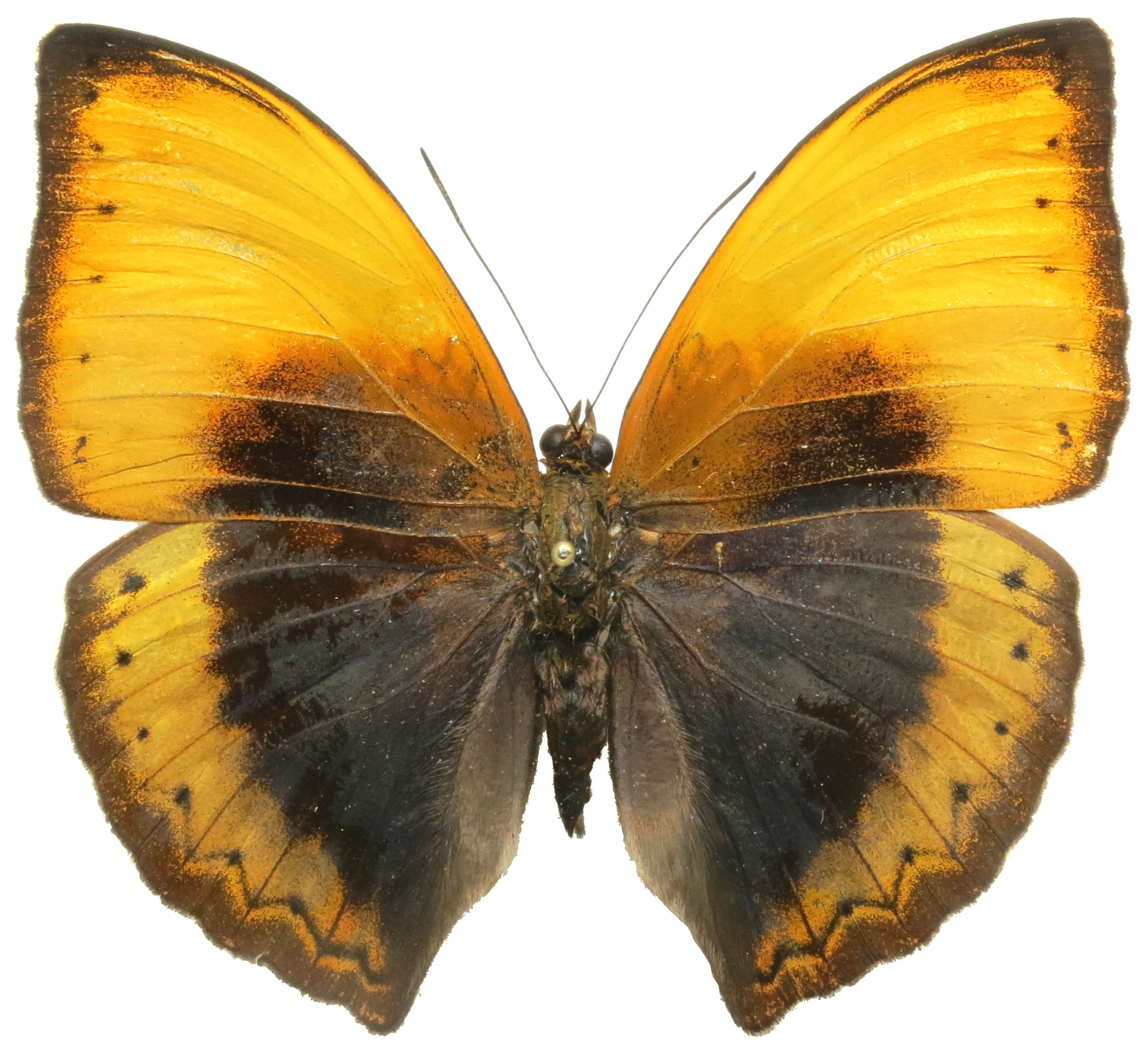
- male - Central African Republic
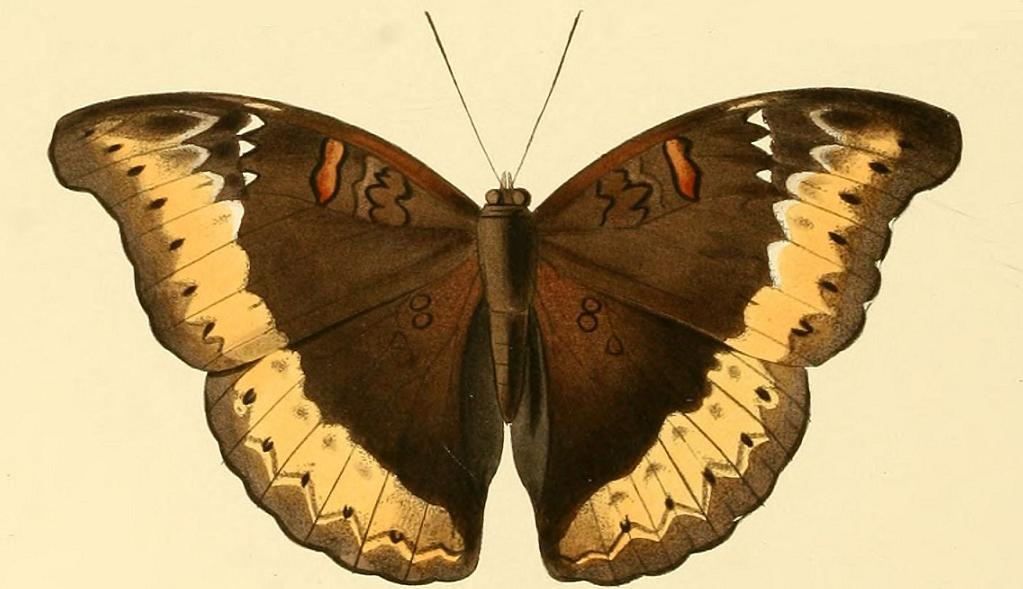
- female

Scientific classification
- Kingdom: Animalia
- Phylum: Arthropoda
- Class: Insecta
- Order: Lepidoptera
- Family: Nymphalidae
- Genus: Cymothoe
- Species: C. hypatha

Binomial name
- Cymothoe hypatha (Hewitson, 1866)

Synonyms
- Harma hypatha Hewitson, 1866; Cymothoe hesiodus Hewitson, 1869; Cymothoe alexander Suffert, 1904; Cymothoe hesiodus f. lucida Overlaet, 1952

= Cymothoe hypatha =

Species of butterfly

Cymothoe hypatha, the large lurid glider, is a butterfly in the family Nymphalidae. It is found in Nigeria, Cameroon, Gabon, the Central African Republic, Angola and the Democratic Republic of the Congo. The habitat consists of primary forests.

The larvae feed on Rinorea species.

== Subspecies ==
- Cymothoe hypatha hypatha (Nigeria: Cross River loop, Gabon, Central African Republic, Angola, northern Democratic Republic of the Congo)
- Cymothoe hypatha okomu Hecq & Larsen, 1997 (western Nigeria)
