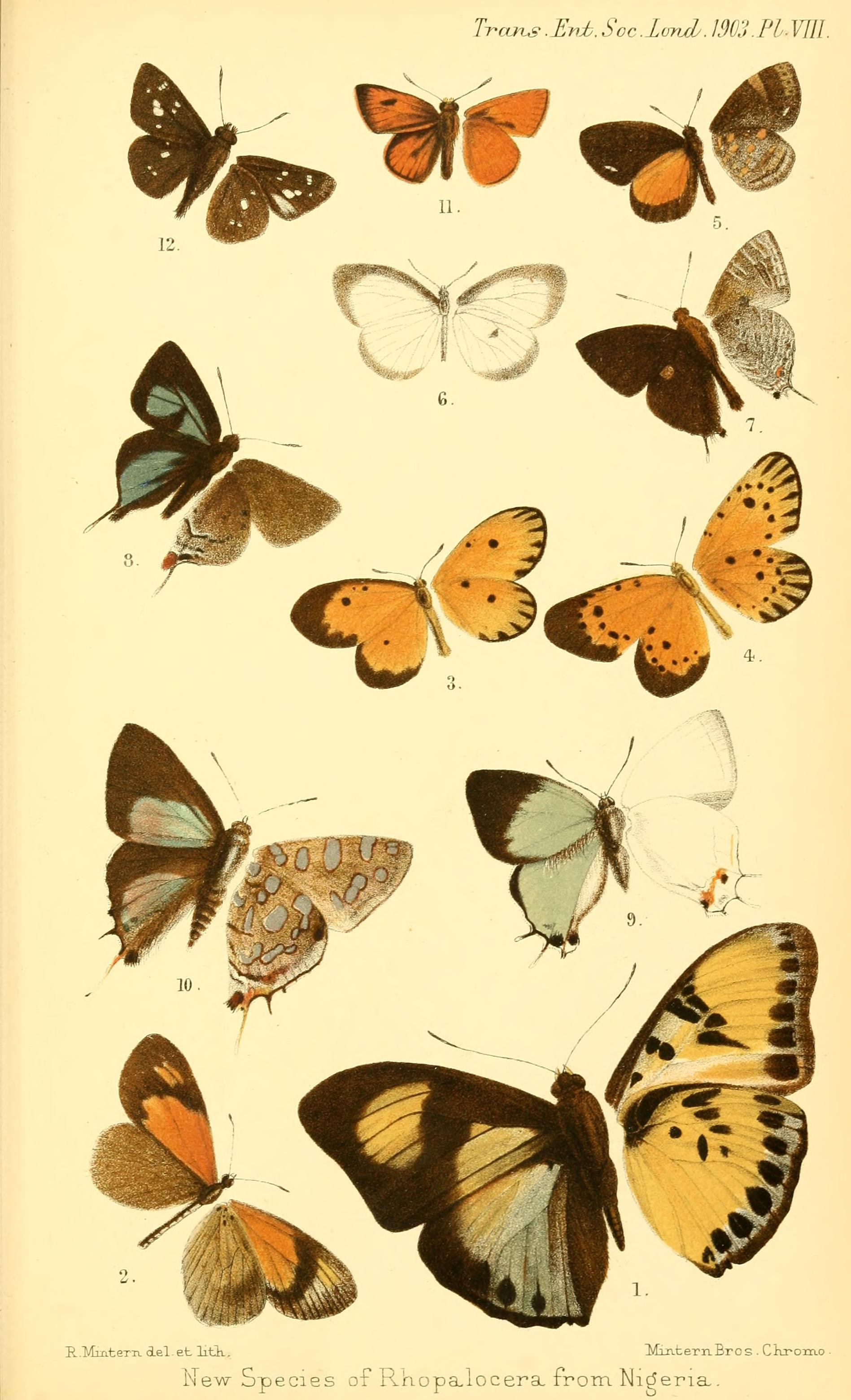
- Figure 6

Scientific classification
- Kingdom: Animalia
- Phylum: Arthropoda
- Clade: Pancrustacea
- Class: Insecta
- Order: Lepidoptera
- Family: Lycaenidae
- Genus: Liptena
- Species: L. submacula

Binomial name
- Liptena submacula Lathy, 1903

= Liptena submacula =

Species of butterfly

Liptena submacula, the Lathy's liptena, is a butterfly in the family Lycaenidae. It is found in Sierra Leone, Liberia, Ivory Coast, Ghana and Nigeria.The habitat consists of forests.

== Subspecies ==
- L. s. submacula (southern Nigeria)
- L. s. liberiana Stempffer, Bennett & May, 1974 (Sierra Leone, Liberia, Ivory Coast)
- L. s. maesseni Stempffer, Bennett & May, 1974 (Ghana: Volta Region)
- L. s. tringa Stempffer, Bennett & May, 1974 (eastern Ivory Coast, Ghana: Ashanti)

Torben Larsen developed a species numbering system for his 2005 publication Butterflies of West Africa. The subspecies tringa is #216. The 'Larsen' numbers have since been used with permission in A Sharp Eye on Butterflies of Ghana.
