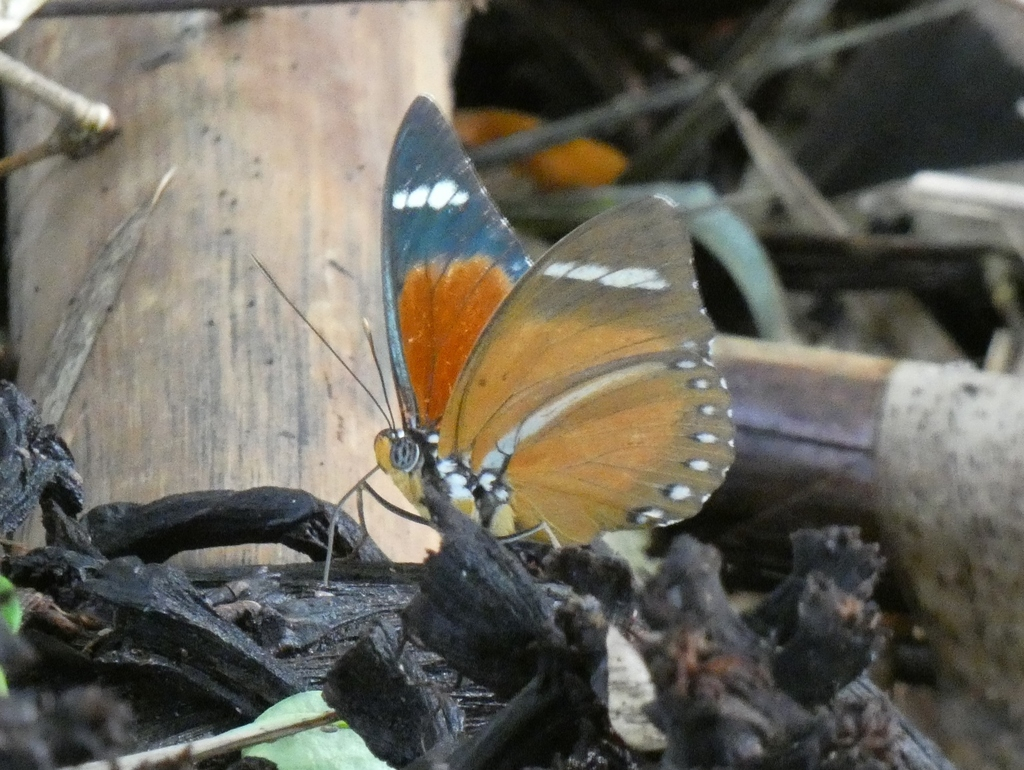

Scientific classification
- Kingdom: Animalia
- Phylum: Arthropoda
- Class: Insecta
- Order: Lepidoptera
- Family: Nymphalidae
- Genus: Euphaedra
- Species: E. simplex

Binomial name
- Euphaedra simplex Hecq, 1978

Synonyms
- Euphaedra (Euphaedrana) simplex

= Euphaedra simplex =

Species of butterfly

Euphaedra simplex, the simple orange forester, is a butterfly in the family Nymphalidae. It is found in eastern Nigeria, Cameroon, the Republic of the Congo, the Central African Republic, the Democratic Republic of the Congo and north-western Zambia. The habitat consists of primary forests.
