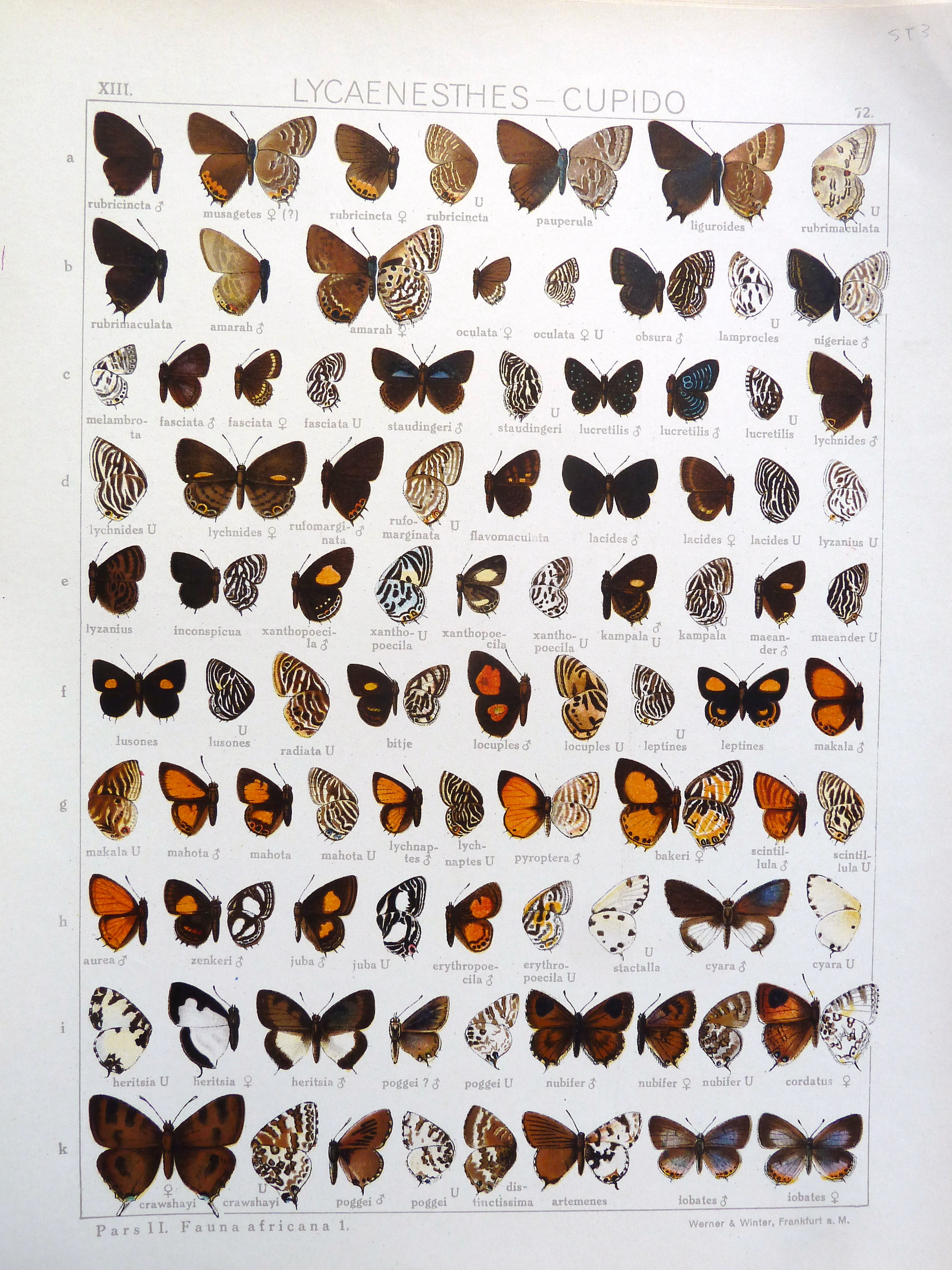
- g

Scientific classification
- Domain: Eukaryota
- Kingdom: Animalia
- Phylum: Arthropoda
- Class: Insecta
- Order: Lepidoptera
- Family: Lycaenidae
- Genus: Anthene
- Species: A. scintillula

Binomial name
- Anthene scintillula (Holland, 1891)

Synonyms
- Lycaenesthes scintillula Holland, 1891; Anthene (Anthene) scintillula; Lycaenesthes aurea Bethune-Baker, 1910

= Anthene scintillula =

Golden ciliate blue

Species of butterfly

Anthene scintillula, the golden ciliate blue, is a butterfly in the family Lycaenidae. It is found in Sierra Leone, Ivory Coast, Ghana, Nigeria, Cameroon, Equatorial Guinea, Gabon, the Republic of the Congo, the Central African Republic, the Democratic Republic of the Congo and Uganda. The habitat consists of forests.

== Subspecies ==
- Anthene scintillula scintillula (eastern Nigeria, Cameroon, Equatorial Guinea, Gabon, Congo, Central African Republic, western Uganda, Democratic Republic of the Congo: Mongala, Uele, Tshopo, Equateur, Sankuru and Maniema)
- Anthene scintillula aurea (Bethune-Baker, 1910) (Sierra Leone, Ivory Coast, Ghana, western Nigeria)
