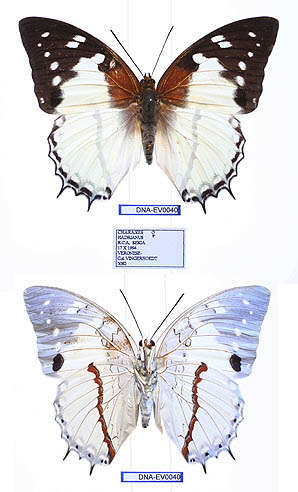

Scientific classification
- Domain: Eukaryota
- Kingdom: Animalia
- Phylum: Arthropoda
- Class: Insecta
- Order: Lepidoptera
- Family: Nymphalidae
- Genus: Charaxes
- Species: C. lecerfi

Binomial name
- Charaxes lecerfi Lathy, 1925

Synonyms
- Charaxes janmoullei Berger, 1975; Charaxes hadrianus lecerfi Lathy, 1926

= Charaxes lecerfi =

Species of butterfly

Charaxes lecerfi, the Le Cerf's white charaxes, is a butterfly in the family Nymphalidae. It is found in Cameroon, the Central African Republic, the Democratic Republic of the Congo and possibly southern Nigeria. The habitat consists of evergreen forests. It is a local and rare species.

The name honours Ferdinand Le Cerf.

== Taxonomy ==
Ranked as a subspecies of Charaxes hadrianus by Vingerhoedt.
