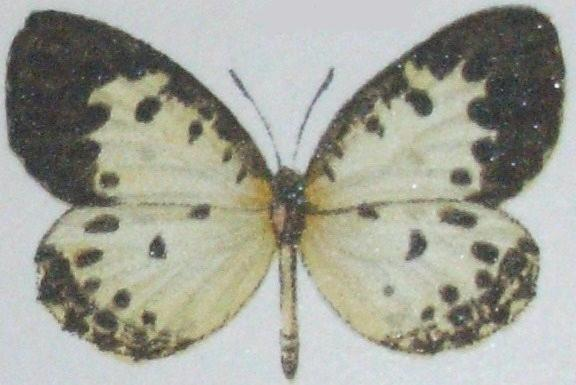

Scientific classification
- Kingdom: Animalia
- Phylum: Arthropoda
- Clade: Pancrustacea
- Class: Insecta
- Order: Lepidoptera
- Family: Lycaenidae
- Genus: Pentila
- Species: P. hewitsoni

Binomial name
- Pentila hewitsoni (Grose-Smith & Kirby, 1887)

Synonyms
- Tingra hewitsoni Grose-Smith and Kirby, 1887; Tingra laura Kirby, 1890; Pentila laura; Tingra limbata Holland, 1893

= Pentila hewitsoni =

Species of butterfly

Pentila hewitsoni, the Hewitson's cream pentila, is a butterfly in the family Lycaenidae. It is found in Guinea, Liberia, Ivory Coast, Ghana, Nigeria, Cameroon, Gabon and the Democratic Republic of the Congo. The habitat consists of deep forests.

Adults are attracted to Marantochloa tendrils, feeding from extrafloral nectaries.

== Subspecies ==
- Pentila hewitsoni hewitsoni (Guinea, Liberia, Ivory Coast, Ghana, southern Nigeria)
- Pentila hewitsoni limbata (Holland, 1893) (Nigeria: Cross River loop, Cameroon, Gabon, Democratic Republic of the Congo: Mongala)

Torben Larsen developed a species numbering system for his 2005 publication Butterflies of West Africa. The nominate subspecies is #157. The 'Larsen' numbers have since been used with permission in A Sharp Eye on Butterflies of Ghana.
