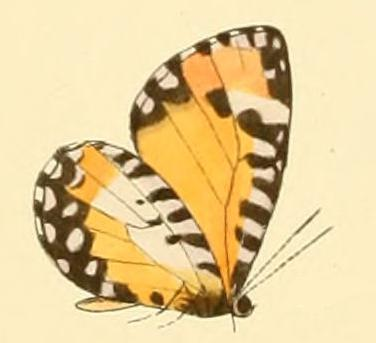

Scientific classification
- Kingdom: Animalia
- Phylum: Arthropoda
- Clade: Pancrustacea
- Class: Insecta
- Order: Lepidoptera
- Family: Lycaenidae
- Genus: Telipna
- Species: T. acraea

Binomial name
- Telipna acraea (Westwood, [1851])

Synonyms
- Liptena acraea Westwood, 1851; Telipna bimacula Plötz, 1880; Liptena echo Grose-Smith and Kirby, 1890; Liptena acraea conjuncta Jackson, 1969; Liptena fervida Grose-Smith & Kirby, 1890; Telipna acraea bimacula f. fem. nigrita Talbot, 1935; Telipna acraea zairiensis Berger, 1981

= Telipna acraea =

Species of insect

Telipna acraea, the common telipna, is a butterfly in the family Lycaenidae. It is found in Sierra Leone, Liberia, Ivory Coast, Ghana, Togo, Nigeria, Cameroon, the Central African Republic and the Democratic Republic of the Congo. The habitat consists of forests.

== Subspecies ==
- Telipna acraea acraea (Sierra Leone, Liberia, Ivory Coast, Ghana, Togo, Nigeria, western Cameroon)
- Telipna acraea fervida (Grose-Smith & Kirby, 1890) (Nigeria, Cameroon)
- Telipna acraea nigrita Talbot, 1935 (Central African Republic, Democratic Republic of the Congo)

Torben Larsen developed a species numbering system for his 2005 publication Butterflies of West Africa. The nominate subspecies is #159. The 'Larsen' numbers have since been used with permission in A Sharp Eye on Butterflies of Ghana.
