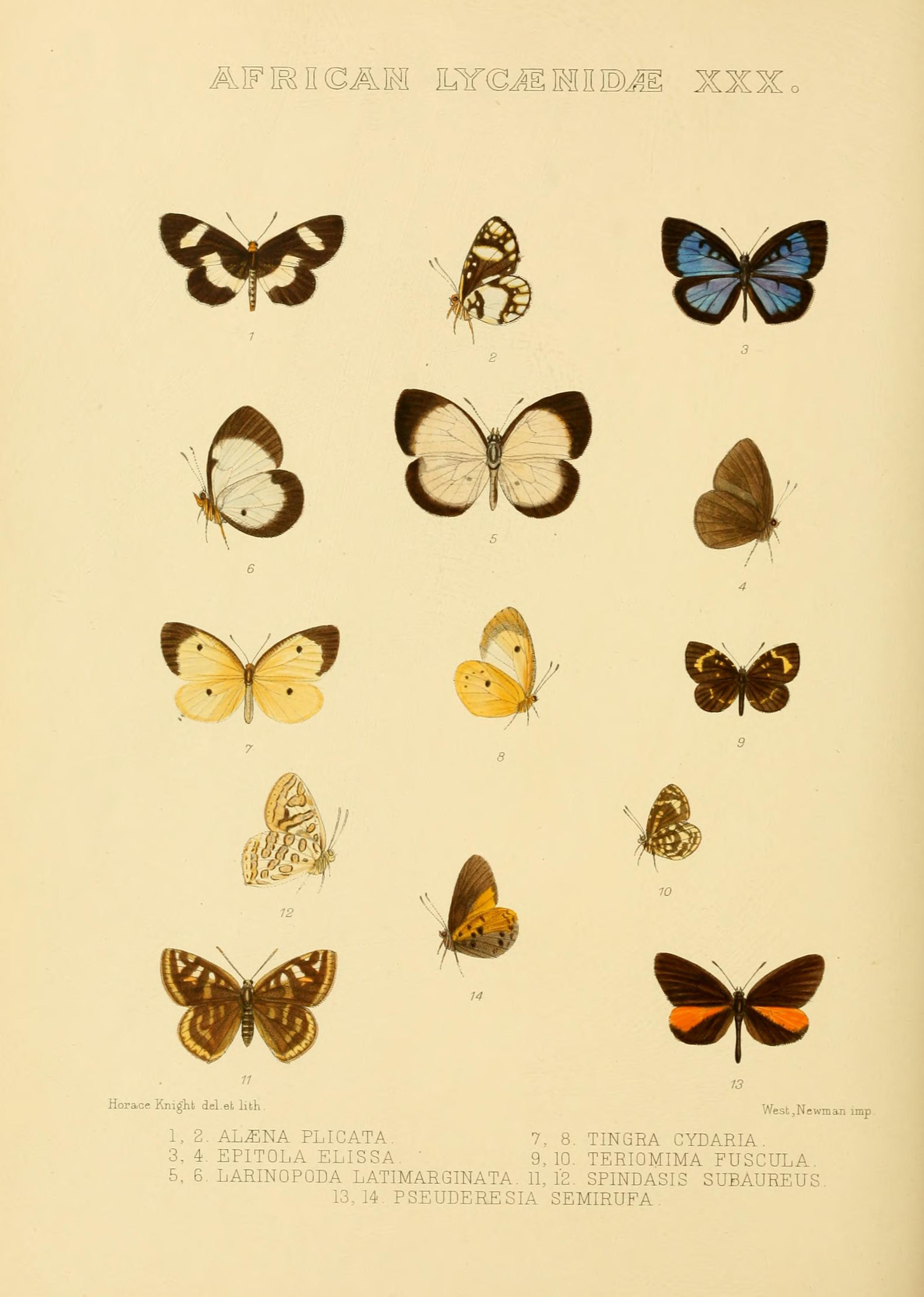
- Figures 7 and 8

Scientific classification
- Kingdom: Animalia
- Phylum: Arthropoda
- Clade: Pancrustacea
- Class: Insecta
- Order: Lepidoptera
- Family: Lycaenidae
- Genus: Pentila
- Species: P. picena

Binomial name
- Pentila picena Hewitson, 1874

Synonyms
- Pentila catori Bethune-Baker, 1906; Tingra cydaria Grose-Smith, 1898

= Pentila picena =

Species of butterfly

Pentila picena, the western cream pentila, is a butterfly in the family Lycaenidae. It is found in Ivory Coast, Ghana, Togo, Benin, Nigeria and possibly Cameroon (the Obudu area). The habitat consists of forests.

Adults feed on extrafloral nectaries on tendrils, including bamboo nectaries.

== Subspecies ==
- Pentila picena picena (Ivory Coast, Ghana)
- Pentila picena catori Bethune-Baker, 1906 (central Nigeria)
- Pentila picena cydaria (Grose-Smith, 1898) (Ghana, southern and western Nigeria)

Torben Larsen developed a species numbering system for his 2005 publication Butterflies of West Africa. The nominate subspecies is #152. The 'Larsen' numbers have since been used with permission in A Sharp Eye on Butterflies of Ghana.
