= Tumerepedes =

Scientific classification
- Domain: Eukaryota
- Kingdom: Animalia
- Phylum: Arthropoda
- Class: Insecta
- Order: Lepidoptera
- Family: Lycaenidae
- Tribe: Liptenini
- Genus: Tumerepedes; Bethune-Baker, 1913
- Species: T. flava

Binomial name
- Tumerepedes flava Bethune-Baker, 1913

Monotypic butterfly genus in family Lycaenidae

Tumerepedes is a genus of butterflies in the family Lycaenidae, endemic to the Afrotropical realm. It consists of only one species, Tumerepedes flava, the Nigerian buff, which is found in northern Nigeria. The habitat consists of riverine forests.
