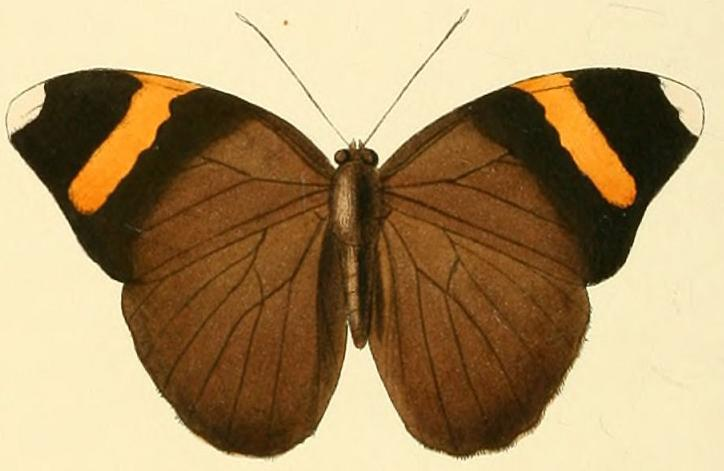

Scientific classification
- Kingdom: Animalia
- Phylum: Arthropoda
- Class: Insecta
- Order: Lepidoptera
- Family: Nymphalidae
- Genus: Euphaedra
- Species: E. losinga

Binomial name
- Euphaedra losinga (Hewitson, 1864)

Synonyms
- Romalaeosoma losinga Hewitson, 1864; Euphaedra (Euphaedrana) losinga; Romaleosoma wardi Druce, 1874; Euphaedra johnstoni Butler, 1888; Euphaedra wardi ab. janthina Schultze, 1920; Euphaedra losinga arcana Hecq, 1978

= Euphaedra losinga =

Species of butterfly

Euphaedra losinga, the dark brown forester, is a butterfly in the family Nymphalidae. It is found in Nigeria, Cameroon, Equatorial Guinea, the Republic of the Congo, the Central African Republic, Angola and the Democratic Republic of the Congo.

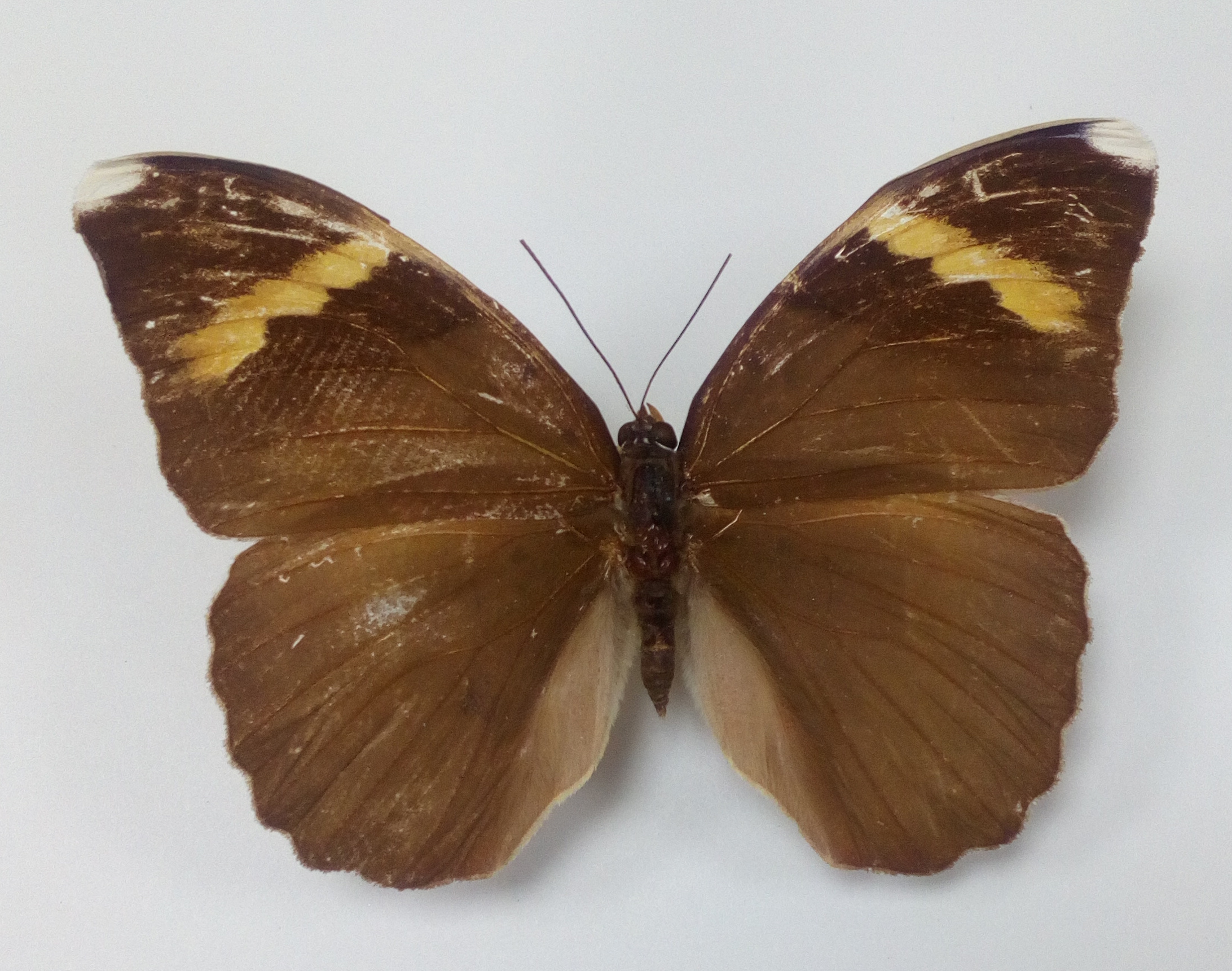
Euphaedra losinga Uganda

== Description ==
Medon Group. The species of this group only agree in having the submarginal spots of the hindwing entirely absent on both surfaces, or at least above. E. losinga Hew. entirely agrees with harpalyce, but differs beneath in the hindwing having in the middle a narrow, sharply defined white transverse band, beginning at the middle of the costal margin and reaching vein 4 or 3; beyond the middle of both wings runs a single dark transverse band, which, however, is often more distinct than the transverse bands in harpalyce; the subapical band of the forewing is white and sharply defined beneath, at least in the anterior part; the cell of both wings beneath with 1-3 black dots. Cameroons, Congo, Angola, ab. impunctata Bartel only differs in having no black dots in the cells beneath and the white median band of the hindwing only represented by a spot in cellule 7.South Cameroons. - inaequabilis Thurau has the subapical band of the forewing narrower, above deeply incised proximally at veins 4 and 5 and beneath broken up into spots; the white median band on the underside of the hindwing is also broken up into spots. Uganda. wardi Druce is very similar to losinga but differs in having a violet or coppery reflection in the anal area. Beneath both wings are bright light green or bluish green, each with three large black spots in the cell and the forewing with a continuous, sharply defined white subapical band; this is usually finely bordered with black basally; the hindwing bears a rather broad white median band, which is often basally margined with black. Old Calabar and Cameroons.

== Biology ==
The habitat consists of forests and secondary growth with a closed canopy.

== Subspecies ==
- E. l. losinga (Nigeria, southern Central African Republic, central and northern Democratic Republic of the Congo)
- E. l. knoopi Hecq, 1988 (Nigeria)
- E. l. limita Hecq, 1978 (Democratic Republic of the Congo: Shaba, Kasai)
- E. l. wardi (Druce, 1874) (Nigeria, Cameroon, Bioko, Congo, Central African Republic, Angola, western Democratic Republic of the Congo)
