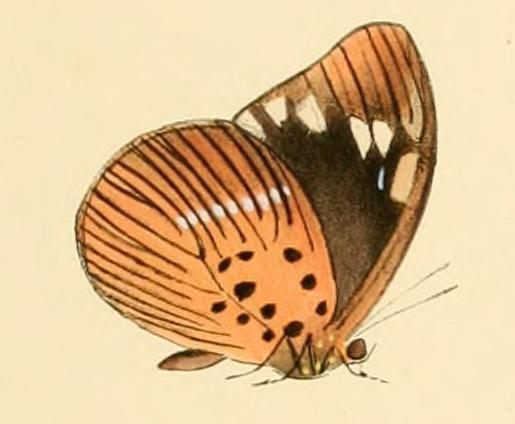

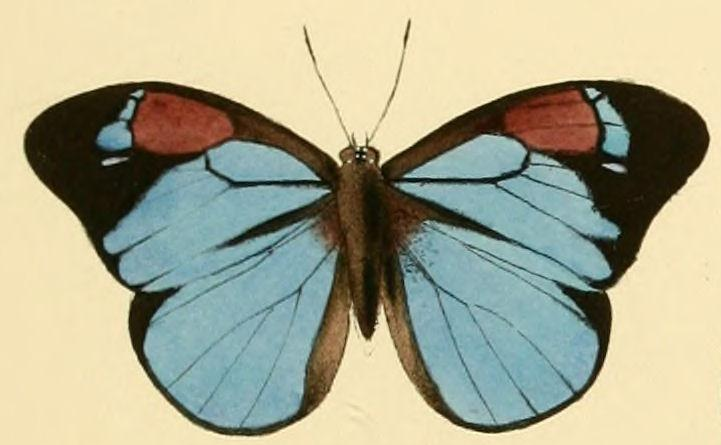

Scientific classification
- Kingdom: Animalia
- Phylum: Arthropoda
- Clade: Pancrustacea
- Class: Insecta
- Order: Lepidoptera
- Family: Lycaenidae
- Subfamily: Poritiinae
- Genus: Aethiopana; Bethune-Baker, 1915
- Species: A. honorius

Binomial name
- Aethiopana honorius (Fabricius, 1793)

Synonyms
- Papilio honorius Fabricius, 1793; Epitola teresa Hewitson, 1869; Epitola honorius ab. coarctata Hulstaert, 1924; Epitola divisa Butler, 1901

= Aethiopana =

Monotypic butterfly genus in family Lycaenidae

Aethiopana is a genus of butterflies in the family Lycaenidae, endemic to the Afrotropical realm. The single species, Aethiopana honorius, the acraea blue, is found in Cameroon, the Republic of the Congo, the Democratic Republic of the Congo, Gabon, Ghana, Guinea, Ivory Coast, Liberia, Nigeria, Sierra Leone, Togo, and Uganda. The habitat consists of forests.

Larvae were found on Crematogaster-infested tree bark. The larvae are brown, very hairy and moth like.

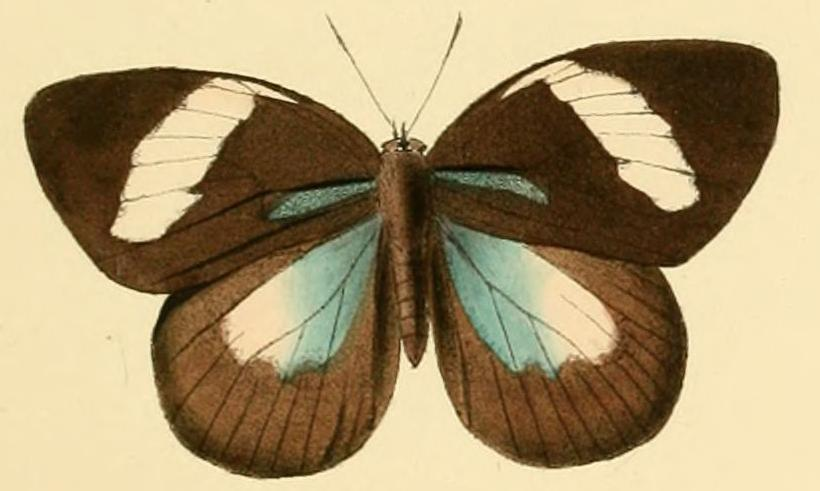

== Subspecies ==
- Aethiopana honorius honorius (Nigeria: south and the Cross River loop, Cameroon, Gabon, Congo, western Uganda, Democratic Republic of the Congo: Mongala, Uele, Tshopo, Tshuapa, Equateur, Kinshasa, Sankuru and Lualaba)
- Aethiopana honorius divisa (Butler, 1901) (Guinea, Sierra Leone, Liberia, Ivory Coast, Ghana, Togo, Nigeria: west of the Niger River)

Torben Larsen developed a species numbering system for his 2005 publication Butterflies of West Africa. The subspecies divisa is #346. The 'Larsen' numbers have since been used with permission in A Sharp Eye on Butterflies of Ghana.
