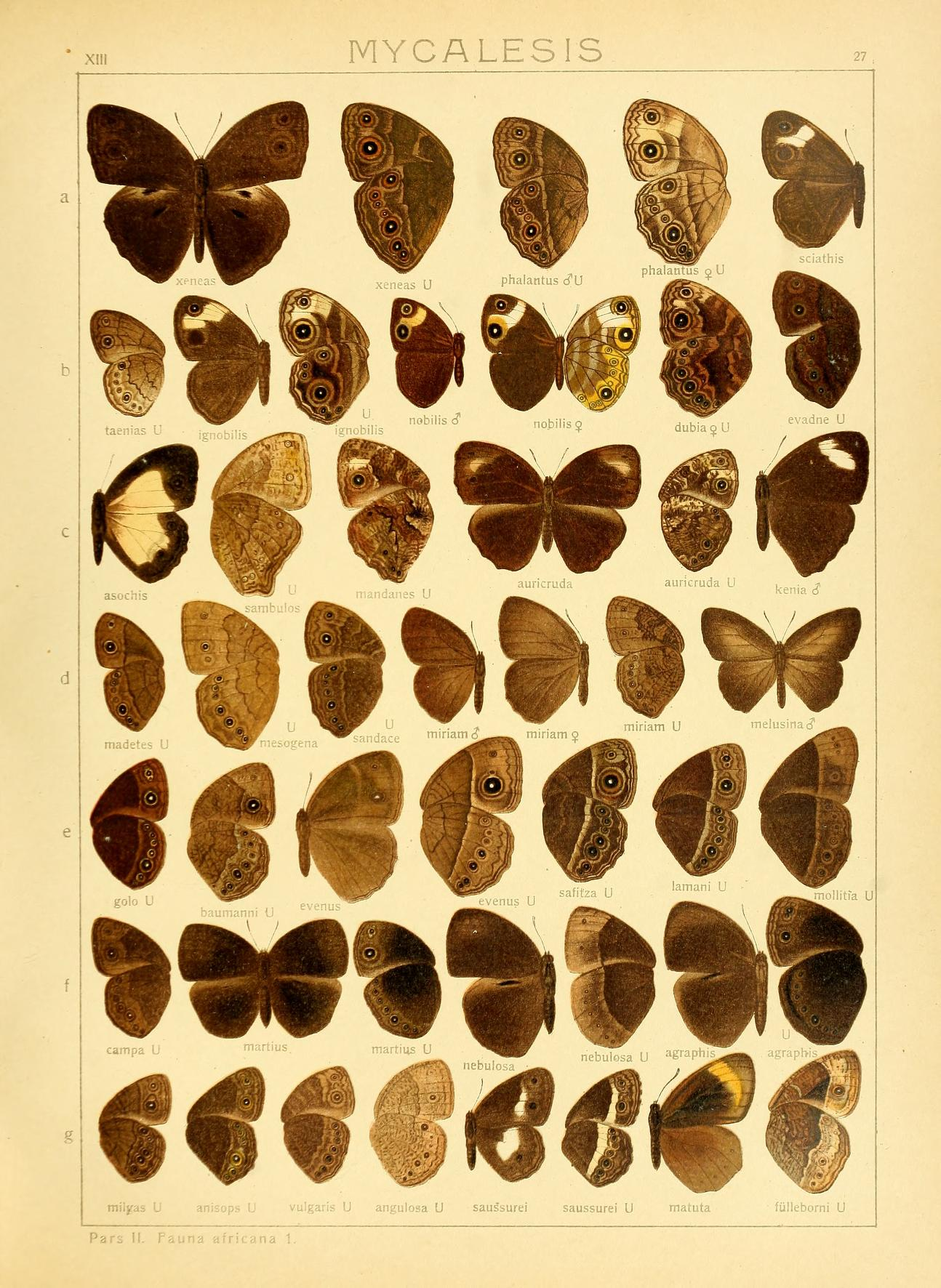

Scientific classification
- Kingdom: Animalia
- Phylum: Arthropoda
- Clade: Pancrustacea
- Class: Insecta
- Order: Lepidoptera
- Family: Nymphalidae
- Genus: Bicyclus
- Species: B. ignobilis

Binomial name
- Bicyclus ignobilis (Butler, 1870)

Synonyms
- Mycalesis ignobilis Butler, 1870

= Bicyclus ignobilis =

Ignoble bush brown

Species of butterfly

Bicyclus ignobilis, the ignoble bush brown, is a butterfly in the family Nymphalidae. It is found in Guinea, Sierra Leone, Liberia, Ivory Coast, Benin, Nigeria, Cameroon, Gabon, the Republic of the Congo, the Central African Republic, the Democratic Republic of the Congo, Uganda and Tanzania. The habitat consists of forests.

== Subspecies ==
- Bicyclus ignobilis ignobilis (Guinea, Sierra Leone, Liberia, Ivory Coast, Benin, western Nigeria)
- Bicyclus ignobilis acutus Condamin, 1965 (Uganda, north-western Tanzania)
- Bicyclus ignobilis eurini Condamin & Fox, 1963 (eastern Nigeria, Cameroon, Gabon, Congo, Central African Republic, Democratic Republic of the Congo)
