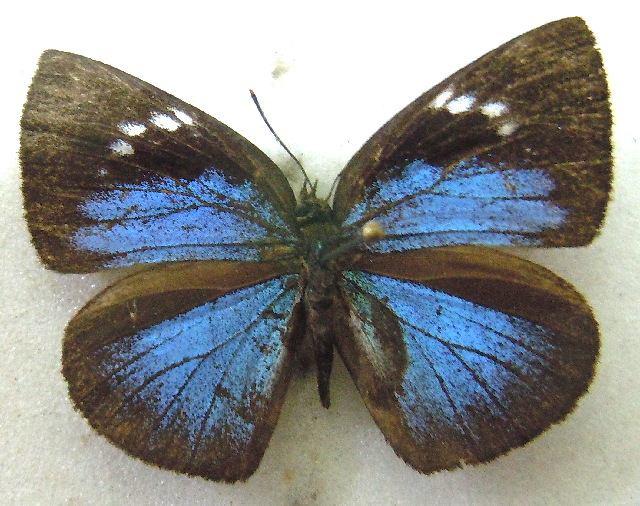

Scientific classification
- Kingdom: Animalia
- Phylum: Arthropoda
- Clade: Pancrustacea
- Class: Insecta
- Order: Lepidoptera
- Family: Lycaenidae
- Genus: Stempfferia
- Species: S. michelae

Binomial name
- Stempfferia michelae Libert, 1999

Synonyms
- Stempfferia (Cercenia) michelae

= Stempfferia michelae =

Species of butterfly

Stempfferia michelae, the furry epitola, is a butterfly in the family Lycaenidae. It is found in Guinea, Sierra Leone, Liberia, Ivory Coast, Ghana, Nigeria, Cameroon, Gabon, the Republic of the Congo, Angola and the Democratic Republic of the Congo. The habitat consists of forests.

A pupa and a pupal case were found on a leaf about 30 cm from a large carton nest of Crematogaster buchneri.

== Subspecies ==
- Stempfferia michelae michelae (Guinea, Sierra Leone, Liberia, Ivory Coast, Ghana, southern Nigeria)
- Stempfferia michelae centralis Libert, 1999 (Cameroon, Gabon, Congo, Angola, north-western Democratic Republic of the Congo, possibly Nigeria: Oban Hills)

Torben Larsen developed a species numbering system for his 2005 publication Butterflies of West Africa. The nominate subspecies is #340. The 'Larsen' numbers have since been used with permission in A Sharp Eye on Butterflies of Ghana.
