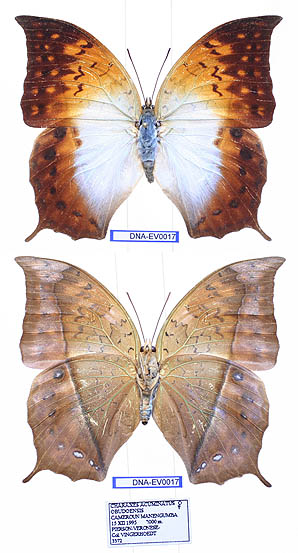

Scientific classification
- Kingdom: Animalia
- Phylum: Arthropoda
- Class: Insecta
- Order: Lepidoptera
- Family: Nymphalidae
- Genus: Charaxes
- Species: C. obudoensis

Binomial name
- Charaxes obudoensis van Someren, 1969

Synonyms
- Charaxes acuminatus obudoensis van Someren, 1969

= Charaxes obudoensis =

Species of butterfly

Charaxes obudoensis, the Obudu pearl charaxes, is a butterfly in the family Nymphalidae. It is found in eastern Nigeria and western Cameroon.

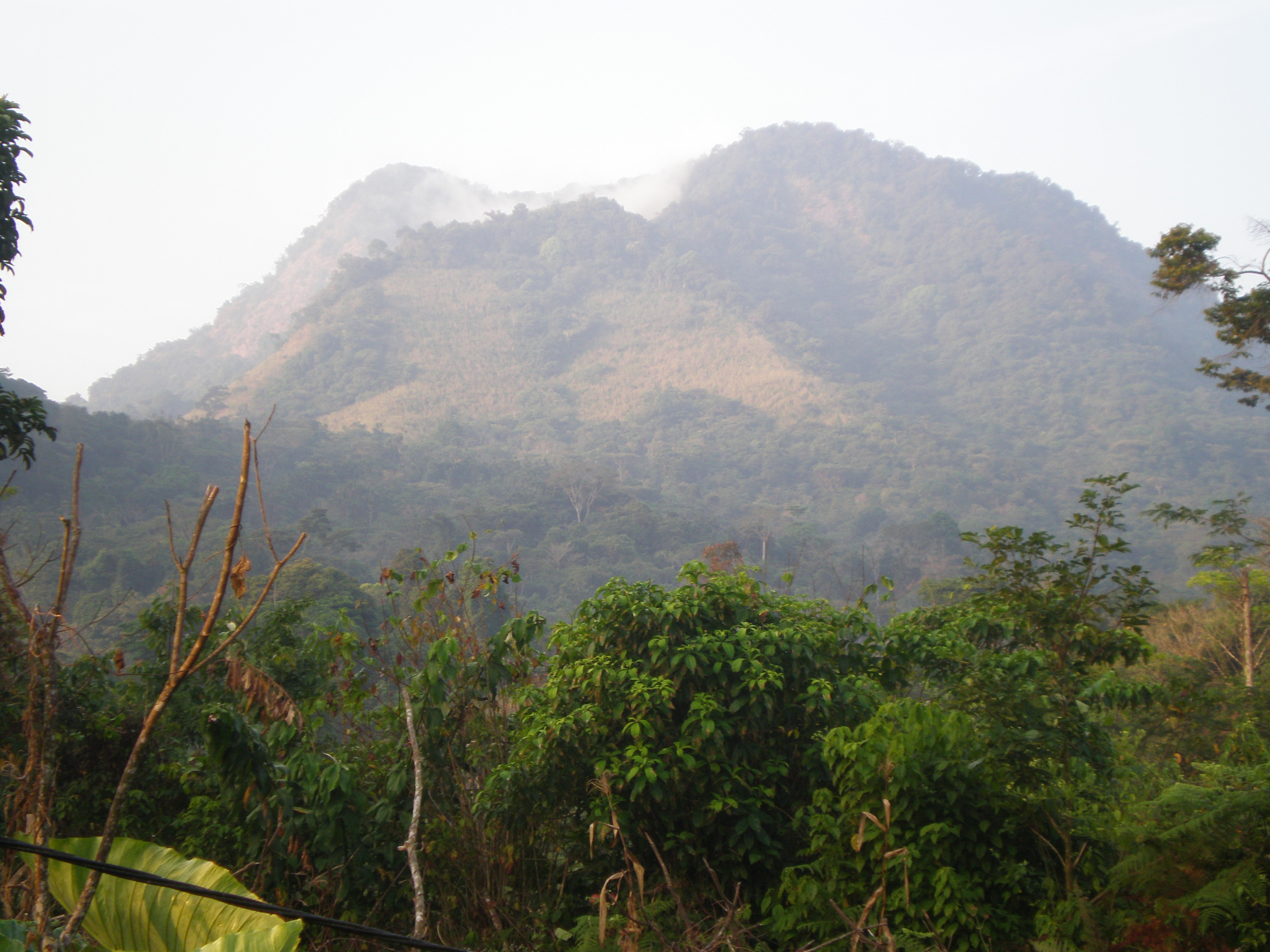
Habitat in Cameroon

The habitat consists of sub-montane and montane forests at altitudes above 1,400 meters.

== Taxonomy ==
The species is sometimes treated as a subspecies of Charaxes acuminatus.
