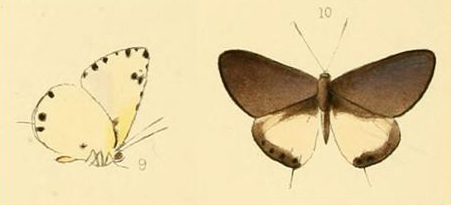

Scientific classification
- Kingdom: Animalia
- Phylum: Arthropoda
- Clade: Pancrustacea
- Class: Insecta
- Order: Lepidoptera
- Family: Lycaenidae
- Subfamily: Polyommatinae
- Tribe: Polyommatini
- Genus: Uranothauma; Karsch, 1895
- Species: U. cyara

Binomial name
- Uranothauma cyara (Hewitson, 1876)

Synonyms
- Lycaena cyara Hewitson, 1876; Phlyaria stactalla Karsch, 1895; Cupido cyara var. tenuimarginata Grünberg, 1908

= Uranothauma cyara =

Monotypic butterfly genus in family Lycaenidae

Uranothauma cyara, formerly Phlyaria cyara, the pied blue, which is found in Guinea, Sierra Leone, Liberia, Ivory Coast, Ghana, Togo, Nigeria, Cameroon, Gabon, the Republic of the Congo, the Central African Republic, Angola, the Democratic Republic of the Congo, Uganda, Kenya and Tanzania. The habitat consists of forests.

The larvae feed on the young shoots of Albizia gummifera.

== Subspecies ==
- Uranothauma cyara cyara (Nigeria: Cross River loop, Cameroon, Gabon, Congo, Central African Republic, Angola, Democratic Republic of the Congo: Mongala, Uele, Tshopo, Equateur, Sankuru, Lualaba)
- Uranothauma cyara stactalla Karsch, 1895 (Guinea, Sierra Leone, Liberia, Ivory Coast, Ghana, Togo, western Nigeria)
- Uranothauma cyara tenuimarginata (Grünberg, 1908) (Uganda, western and central Kenya, Democratic Republic of the Congo: east to Ituri and North Kivu, western Tanzania)

Torben Larsen developed a species numbering system for his 2005 publication Butterflies of West Africa. The subspecies stactala, then ''Phlyaria cyara stactakla is #574. The 'Larsen' numbers have since been used with permission in A Sharp Eye on Butterflies of Ghana.
