= Euphaedra diffusa =

Scientific classification
- Kingdom: Animalia
- Phylum: Arthropoda
- Clade: Pancrustacea
- Class: Insecta
- Order: Lepidoptera
- Family: Nymphalidae
- Genus: Euphaedra
- Species: E. diffusa

Binomial name
- Euphaedra diffusa Gaede, 1916

Synonyms
- Euphaedra xypete var. diffusa Gaede, 1916; Euphaedra (Xypetana) diffusa; Euphaedra cyanea Holland, 1920; Euphaedra hollandi albocoerulea Hecq, 1976; Euphaedra albocoerulea; Euphaedra xypete f. albocoerulea Rothschild, 1918

Species of butterfly

Euphaedra diffusa, the unmarked pink forester, is a butterfly in the family Nymphalidae. It is found in Guinea, Sierra Leone, Liberia, Ivory Coast, Ghana, Togo, Nigeria, Cameroon, Gabon, the Republic of the Congo, the Democratic Republic of the Congo, Uganda, Burundi and Tanzania. The habitat consists of drier forests.

== Subspecies ==
- Euphaedra diffusa diffusa (eastern Nigeria, western Cameroon, Gabon, Congo, Democratic Republic of the Congo, Uganda, Burundi, western Tanzania)
- Euphaedra diffusa albocoerulea Hecq, 1976 (Guinea, Sierra Leone, Liberia, Ivory Coast, Ghana, Togo, western Nigeria)

Torben Larsen developed a species numbering system for his 2005 publication Butterflies of West Africa. The subspecies albocoerulea is #1059. The 'Larsen' numbers have since been used with permission in A Sharp Eye on Butterflies of Ghana.

== Description ==
The original description reads (translated from German)

Euphaedra xypete Hew. v. diffusa nova var.

On the upper side [distinguished] by the washed-out white subapical band of the forewing and beneath by the very washed-out submarginal corner on both wings and [by] the leathery brown ground colour of the form mirabilis Bartel [Euphaedra xypete ab. mirabilis Bartel, 1905; Novit. Zool. 12: 142]. Below all black discal spots are missing, only in the middle cells there are 3 spots on the forewing and 2 spots on the hind wing. The red color on the anterior edge of the hind wing does not reach as far outwards as in typical xypete.

Wingspan 82 mm.

Type: 1 2 Dengdeng, New Cameroon, 23.—28. II. 14, collector Dr. Mildbraed.[German expedition led by Johannes Mildbraed in the Rugege forest German East Africa].

From the Staudinger Collection, the Museum owns xypete from Sierra Leone, which form transitions to diffusa, in that the underside of the hind wing still shows faint discal spots.
