= Cymothoe euthalioides =

Scientific classification
- Kingdom: Animalia
- Phylum: Arthropoda
- Class: Insecta
- Order: Lepidoptera
- Family: Nymphalidae
- Genus: Cymothoe
- Species: C. euthalioides

Binomial name
- Cymothoe euthalioides Kirby, 1889

Synonyms
- Cymothoe sangaris ab. gerrescheimi Neustetter, 1912; Cymothoe sangaris albomarginata Neustetter, 1921

Species of butterfly

Cymothoe euthalioides is a butterfly in the family Nymphalidae. It is found from Sierra Leone to Nigeria and in Cameroon.

== Subspecies ==
- Cymothoe euthalioides euthalioides (eastern Nigeria, Cameroon)
- Cymothoe euthalioides albomarginata Neustetter, 1921 (Sierra Leone to western Nigeria)
