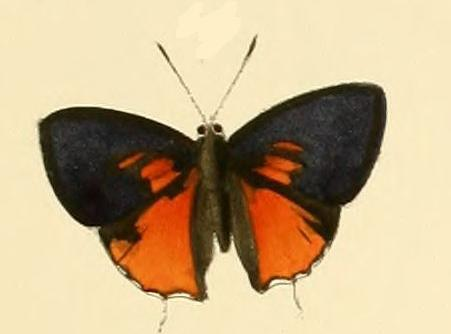

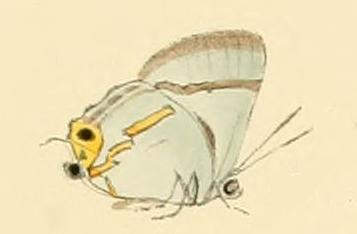

Scientific classification
- Domain: Eukaryota
- Kingdom: Animalia
- Phylum: Arthropoda
- Class: Insecta
- Order: Lepidoptera
- Family: Lycaenidae
- Genus: Pilodeudorix
- Species: P. aruma

Binomial name
- Pilodeudorix aruma (Hewitson, 1873)

Synonyms
- Hypolycaena aruma Hewitson, 1873; Hypolycaena rava Holland, 1892; Deudorix aruma var. simplex Schultze, 1917; Pilodeudorix aruma reducta Libert, 2004

= Pilodeudorix aruma =

Species of butterfly

Pilodeudorix aruma, the small red playboy, is a butterfly in the family Lycaenidae. It is found in Nigeria, Cameroon, Gabon, the Republic of the Congo, the Central African Republic, the Democratic Republic of the Congo and Uganda. The habitat consists of primary forests.

== Subspecies ==
- Pilodeudorix aruma aruma (Nigeria: Cross River loop, Cameroon, Gabon, Congo, Central African Republic)
- Pilodeudorix aruma nigeriana Libert, 2004 (eastern Nigeria)
- Pilodeudorix aruma pallidior Libert, 2004 (Central African Republic, western Uganda)
- Pilodeudorix aruma simplex (Schultze, 1917) (Democratic Republic of the Congo)

== Images ==
External images from Royal Museum of Central Africa.
