= Pilodeudorix mimeta =

Scientific classification
- Kingdom: Animalia
- Phylum: Arthropoda
- Clade: Pancrustacea
- Class: Insecta
- Order: Lepidoptera
- Family: Lycaenidae
- Genus: Pilodeudorix
- Species: P. mimeta

Binomial name
- Pilodeudorix mimeta (Karsch, 1895)

Synonyms
- Actis mimeta Karsch, 1895; Hypomyrina perigrapha Karsch, 1895; Deudorix unda Gaede, 1915

Species of butterfly

Pilodeudorix mimeta, the green-and-orange playboy, is a butterfly in the family Lycaenidae. It is found in Nigeria, Cameroon, Gabon, the Republic of the Congo, the Central African Republic, the Democratic Republic of the Congo, Tanzania and Zambia. The habitat consists of primary forests.

== Images ==
External images from Royal Museum of Central Africa.

== Subspecies ==
- Pilodeudorix mimeta mimeta (Nigeria: Cross River loop, Cameroon, Gabon, Congo, Central African Republic, Democratic Republic of the Congo, Zambia)
- Pilodeudorix mimeta angusta Libert, 2004 (north-eastern Democratic Republic of the Congo, western Tanzania)
- Pilodeudorix mimeta oreas Libert, 2004 (Nigeria, Cameroon)
