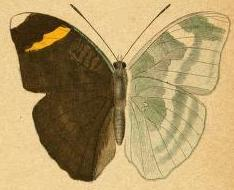

Scientific classification
- Kingdom: Animalia
- Phylum: Arthropoda
- Class: Insecta
- Order: Lepidoptera
- Family: Nymphalidae
- Genus: Bebearia
- Species: B. flaminia

Binomial name
- Bebearia flaminia (Staudinger, 1891)

Synonyms
- Euryphene flaminia Staudinger, 1891; Bebearia (Bebearia) flaminia

= Bebearia flaminia =

Species of butterfly

Bebearia flaminia, the Flaminia forester, is a butterfly in the family Nymphalidae. It is found in Nigeria, Cameroon, Equatorial Guinea, the Republic of the Congo, the Central African Republic, the Democratic Republic of the Congo and western Uganda. The habitat consists of forests.

E. flaminia Stgr. (40e) recalls Euphaedra spatiosa, especially beneath.

The larvae feed on an unidentified dicotyledonous bush.

== Subspecies ==
- Bebearia flaminia flaminia (eastern Nigeria, Cameroon, Equatorial Guinea, Congo, Central African Republic, western Uganda: Semuliki National Park, Democratic Republic of the Congo: Ubangi, Mongala, Uele, north Kivu, Tshopo, Equateur, Sankuru and Lualaba)
- Bebearia flaminia leventisi Hecq & Larsen, 1997 (western Nigeria)

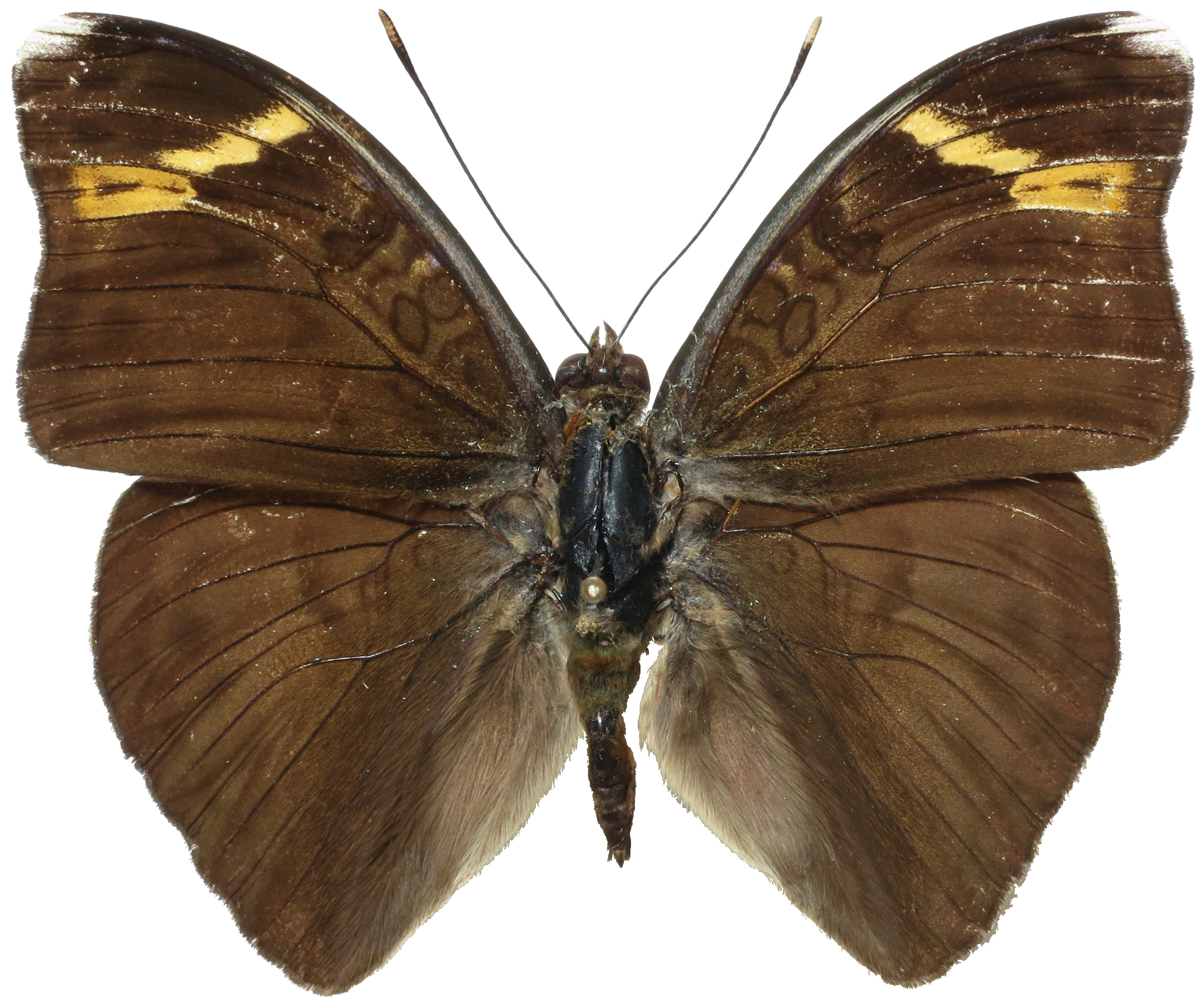
Male – Mabalmayo, Cameroon
