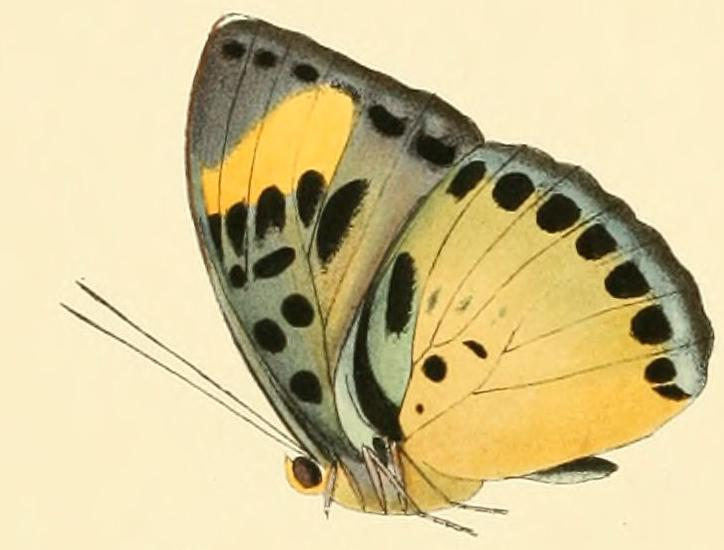

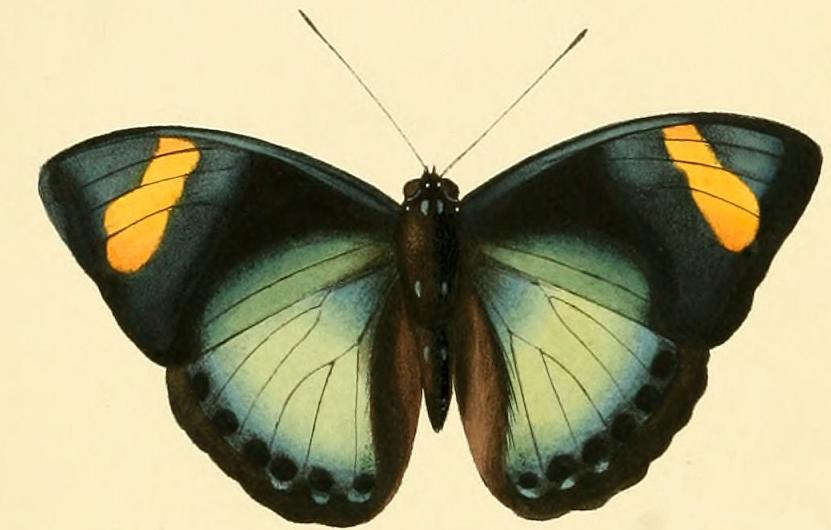

Scientific classification
- Kingdom: Animalia
- Phylum: Arthropoda
- Class: Insecta
- Order: Lepidoptera
- Family: Nymphalidae
- Genus: Euphaedra
- Species: E. ravola

Binomial name
- Euphaedra ravola (Hewitson, 1866)

Synonyms
- Romalaeosoma ravola Hewitson, 1866; Euphaedra (Euphaedrana) ravola; Euphaedra ravola f. insignis Hecq, 1983

= Euphaedra ravola =

Species of butterfly

Euphaedra ravola, the Ravola Ceres forester, is a butterfly in the family Nymphalidae. It is found in Nigeria, Cameroon, the Democratic Republic of the Congo and possibly Ivory Coast and Ghana. The habitat consists of forests.

Both sexes are attracted to fallen fruit.

The larvae are gregarious.

== Similar species ==
Other members of the Euphaedra ceres species group q.v.
