= C. crocea =

C. crocea may refer to:

- Canna crocea, a garden plant
- Cassine crocea, a South African tree
- Chlorocypha crocea, a carnivorous insect
- Colias crocea, a small butterfly
- Cymothoe crocea, a Cameroonian butterfly
