= Cymothoe lambertoni =

Scientific classification
- Kingdom: Animalia
- Phylum: Arthropoda
- Clade: Pancrustacea
- Class: Insecta
- Order: Lepidoptera
- Family: Nymphalidae
- Genus: Cymothoe
- Species: C. lambertoni

Binomial name
- Cymothoe lambertoni Oberthür, 1923

Synonyms
- Cymothoe lambertoni f. lux Le Cerf, 1928; Cymothoe lambertoni lambertoni f. turlini Viette, 1971

Species of butterfly

Cymothoe lambertoni is a butterfly in the family Nymphalidae. It is found on Madagascar. The habitat consists of forests.
