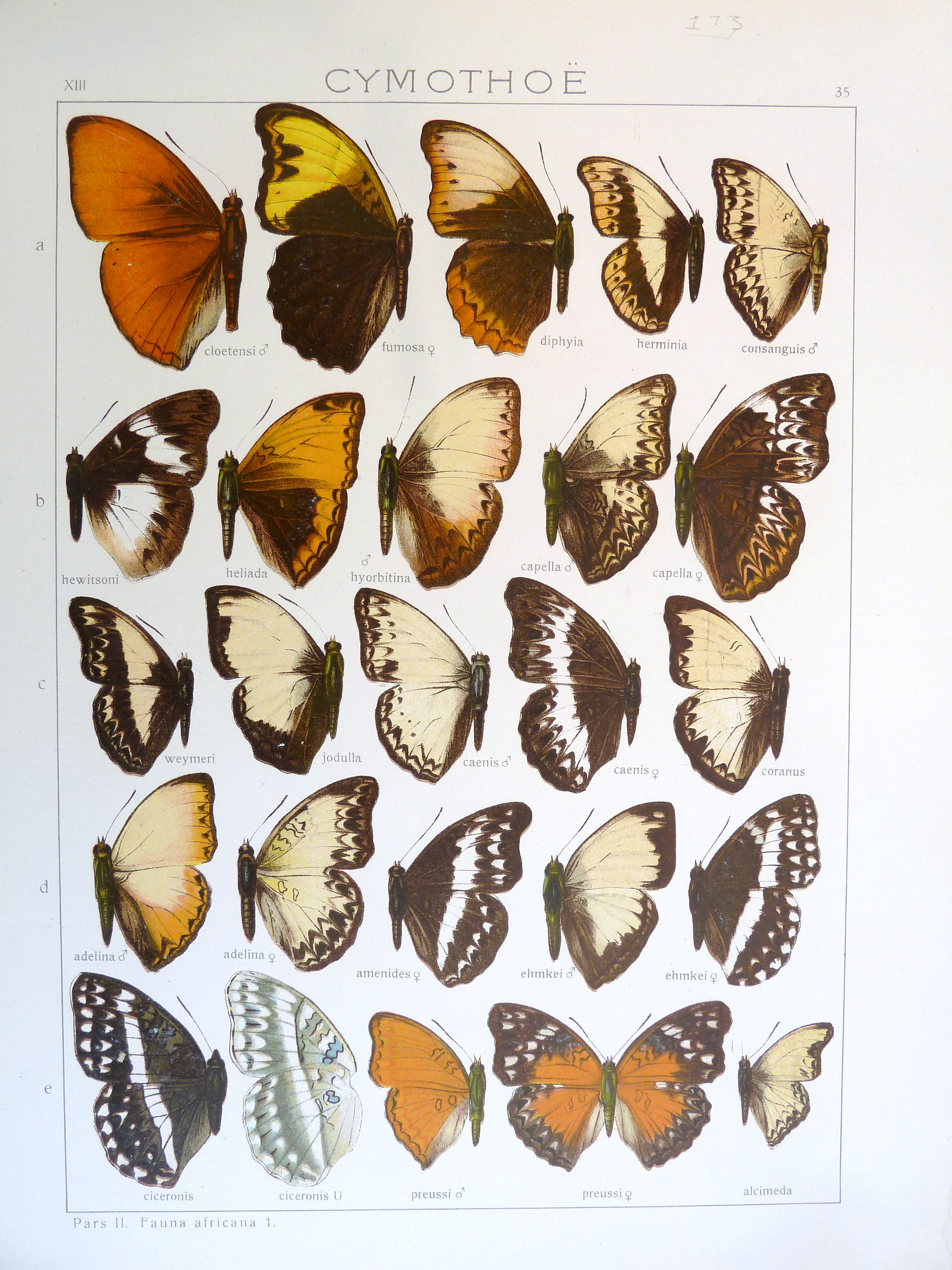
- In Adalbert Seitz's Fauna Africana

Scientific classification
- Kingdom: Animalia
- Phylum: Arthropoda
- Class: Insecta
- Order: Lepidoptera
- Family: Nymphalidae
- Genus: Cymothoe
- Species: C. capella

Binomial name
- Cymothoe capella (Ward, 1871)

Synonyms
- Harma capella Ward, 1871

= Cymothoe capella =

Golden glider

Species of butterfly

Cymothoe capella, the golden glider, is a butterfly in the family Nymphalidae. It is found in Nigeria (the Cross River loop and the eastern part of the country), Cameroon, Equatorial Guinea, Gabon, the Republic of the Congo, the Central African Republic and the Democratic Republic of the Congo (Tshopo and Sankuru). The habitat consists of primary forests.
