= Cymothoe colmanti =

Scientific classification
- Kingdom: Animalia
- Phylum: Arthropoda
- Class: Insecta
- Order: Lepidoptera
- Family: Nymphalidae
- Genus: Cymothoe
- Species: C. colmanti

Binomial name
- Cymothoe colmanti Aurivillius, 1898

Species of butterfly

Cymothoe colmanti is a butterfly in the family Nymphalidae. It is found in the northern part of the Democratic Republic of the Congo and the Central African Republic.
