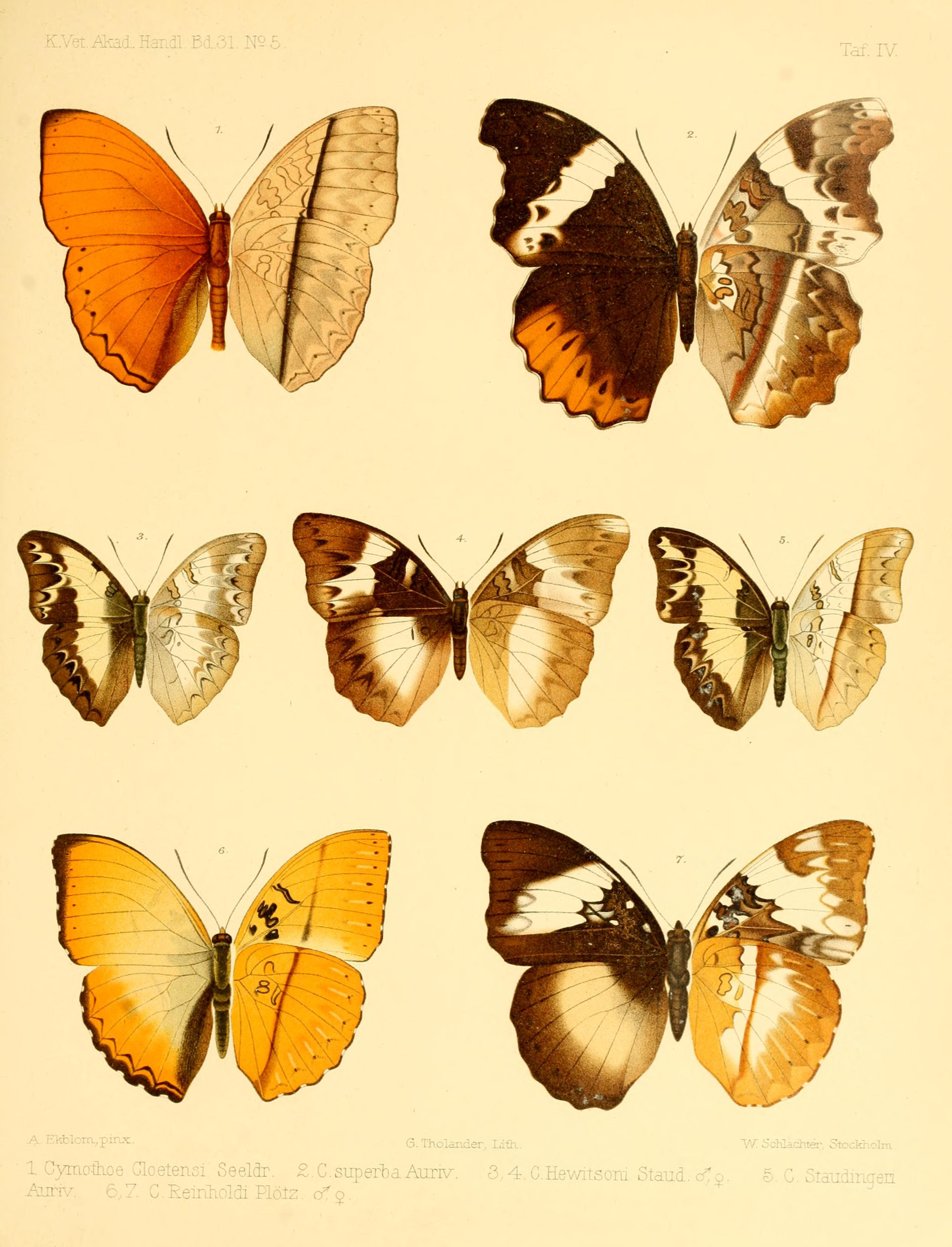
- in Rhopalocera Aethiopica Aurivillius, 1899 (figures 6, 7)

Scientific classification
- Kingdom: Animalia
- Phylum: Arthropoda
- Class: Insecta
- Order: Lepidoptera
- Family: Nymphalidae
- Genus: Cymothoe
- Species: C. reinholdi

Binomial name
- Cymothoe reinholdi (Plötz, 1880)

Synonyms
- Harma reinholdi Plötz, 1880; Cymothoe theodora Staudinger, 1890

= Cymothoe reinholdi =

Reinhold's creamy glider

Species of butterfly

Cymothoe reinholdi, or Reinhold's creamy glider, is a butterfly in the family Nymphalidae. It is found in Nigeria, Cameroon, Gabon, the Republic of the Congo, the Central African Republic and the Democratic Republic of the Congo. The habitat consists of primary forests.

The larvae feed on Caseria congoensis.

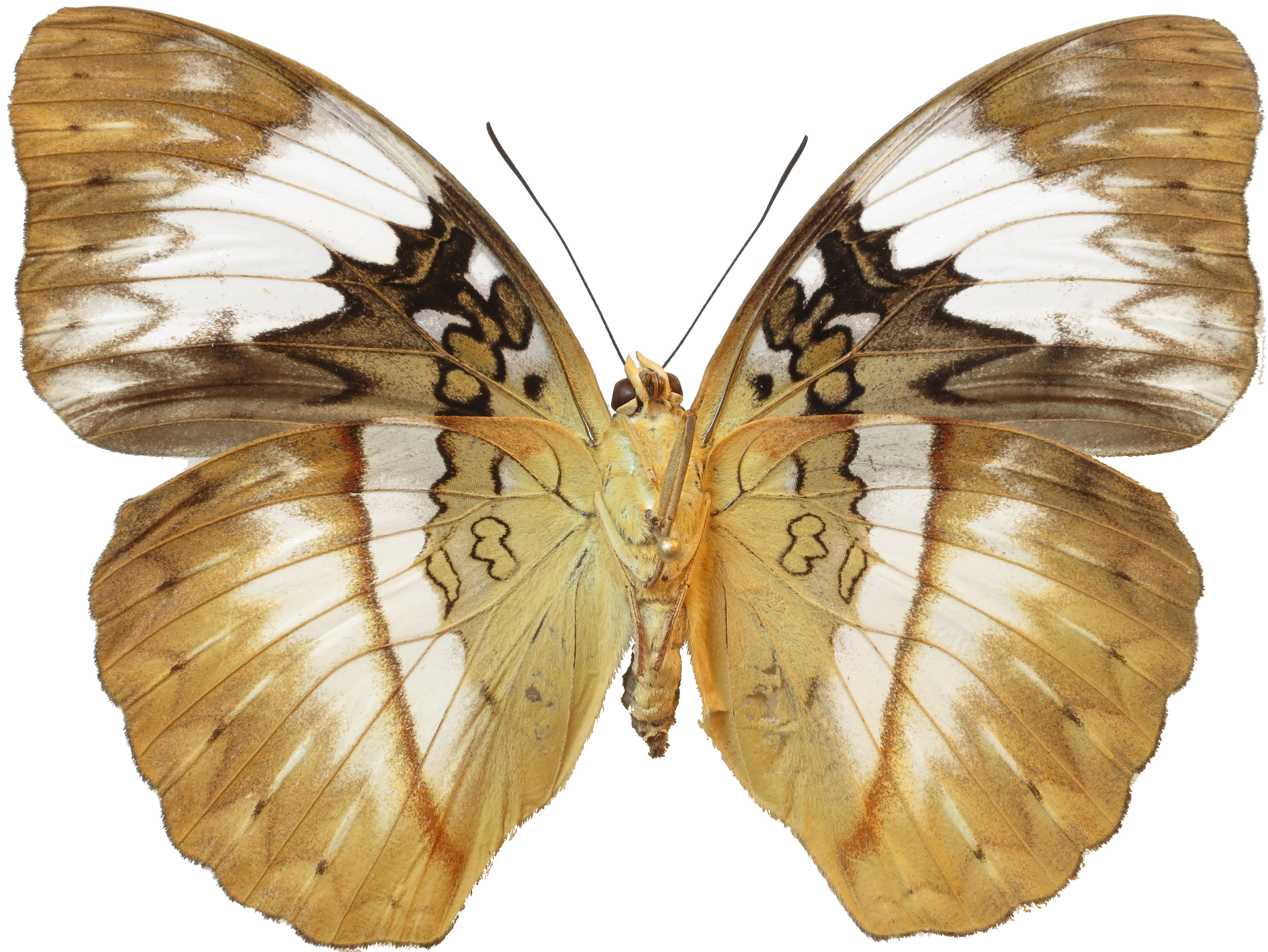
C. reinholdi vitalis female from CAR - ventral side

== Subspecies ==
- Cymothoe reinholdi reinholdi (Nigeria: Cross River loop, Cameroon, Gabon, Congo)
- Cymothoe reinholdi vitalis Rebel, 1914 (Central African Republic, central and north-eastern Democratic Republic of the Congo)
