= Cymothoe dujardini =

Scientific classification
- Kingdom: Animalia
- Phylum: Arthropoda
- Class: Insecta
- Order: Lepidoptera
- Family: Nymphalidae
- Genus: Cymothoe
- Species: C. dujardini

Binomial name
- Cymothoe dujardini Viette, 1971

Synonyms
- Cymothoe lambertoni dujardini Viette, 1971

Species of butterfly

Cymothoe dujardini is a butterfly in the family Nymphalidae. It is found in eastern Madagascar. The habitat consists of forests.
