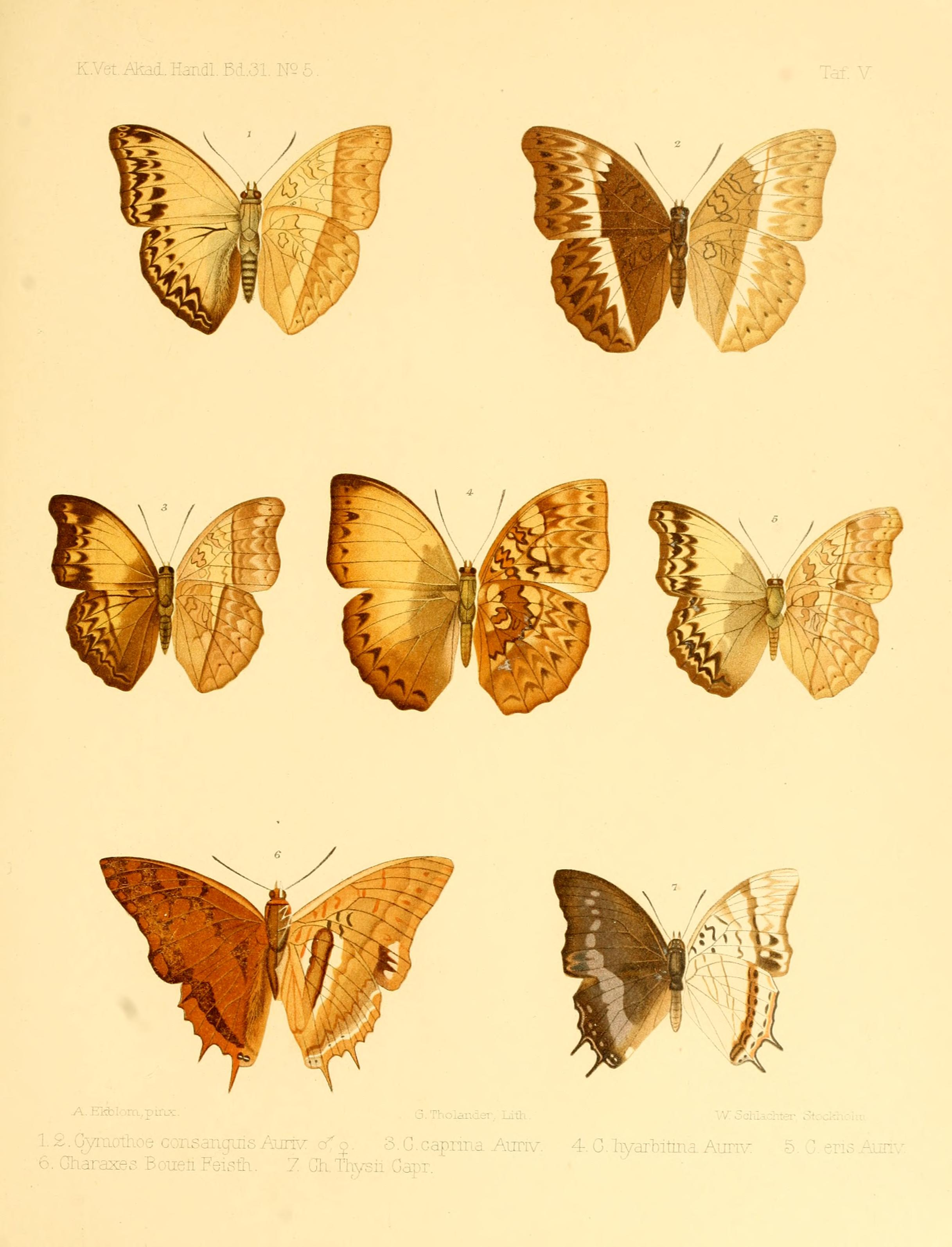
- in Rhopalocera Aethiopica Aurivillius, 1899 (figure 3)

Scientific classification
- Kingdom: Animalia
- Phylum: Arthropoda
- Class: Insecta
- Order: Lepidoptera
- Family: Nymphalidae
- Genus: Cymothoe
- Species: C. caprina

Binomial name
- Cymothoe caprina Aurivillius, 1897

= Cymothoe caprina =

Species of butterfly

Cymothoe caprina is a butterfly in the family Nymphalidae. It is found in the Republic of the Congo and the south-central part of the Democratic Republic of the Congo.
