= Cymothoe megaesta =

Scientific classification
- Kingdom: Animalia
- Phylum: Arthropoda
- Class: Insecta
- Order: Lepidoptera
- Family: Nymphalidae
- Genus: Cymothoe
- Species: C. megaesta

Binomial name
- Cymothoe megaesta Staudinger, 1890

Synonyms
- Cymothoe egesta var. megaesta Studinger, 1890

Species of butterfly

Cymothoe megaesta is a butterfly in the family Nymphalidae. It is found in Cameroon.

The larvae feed on Rinorea lepidobotrys.
