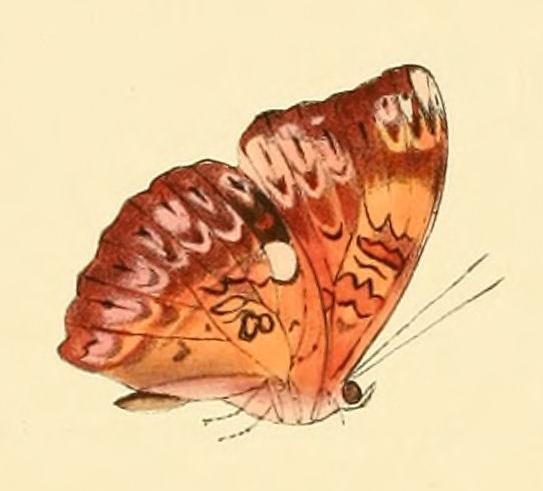

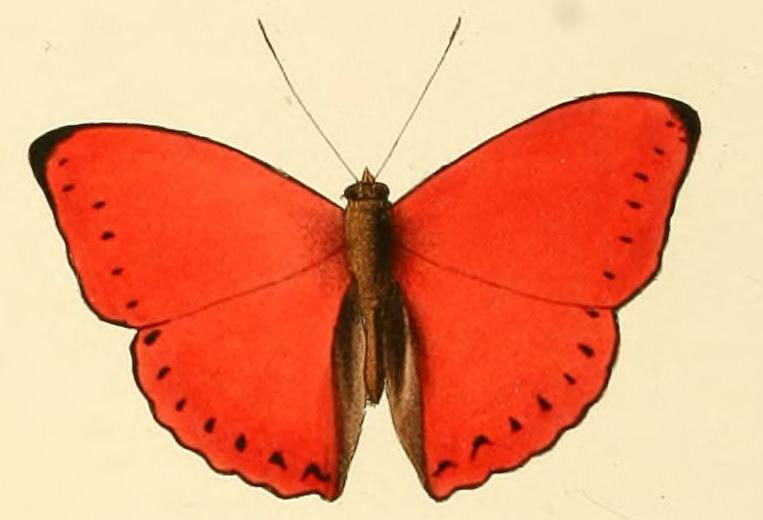

Scientific classification
- Kingdom: Animalia
- Phylum: Arthropoda
- Clade: Pancrustacea
- Class: Insecta
- Order: Lepidoptera
- Family: Nymphalidae
- Genus: Cymothoe
- Species: C. coccinata

Binomial name
- Cymothoe coccinata (Hewitson, 1874)

Synonyms
- Harma coccinata Hewitson, 1874; Harma sangaris Godart; Hewitson, 1866; Cymothoe coccinata ab. zickzack Strand, 1912; Cymothoe coccinata f. lecerfi Overlaet, 1944; Cymothoe excelsior f. spatiosa Overlaet, 1945; Cymothoe coccinata bergeri Overlaet, 1952

= Cymothoe coccinata =

Common red glider

Species of butterfly

Cymothoe coccinata, the common red glider, is a butterfly in the family Nymphalidae. It is found in Ivory Coast, Ghana, Nigeria, Cameroon, the Republic of the Congo, Gabon and the Democratic Republic of the Congo. The habitat consists of forests.

The larvae feed on Rinorea oblongifolia.

== Subspecies ==
- Cymothoe coccinata coccinata (Ivory Coast, Ghana, Nigeria, Cameroon, Congo, Gabon, Democratic Republic of the Congo: Ubangi, Tshopo, Equateur)
- Cymothoe coccinata vrydaghi Overlaet, 1944 (Democratic Republic of the Congo: Ubangi, Mongala, Uele, Kivu)

Torben Larsen developed a species numbering system for his 2005 publication Butterflies of West Africa. The nominate subspecies is #872. The 'Larsen' numbers have since been used with permission in A Sharp Eye on Butterflies of Ghana.
