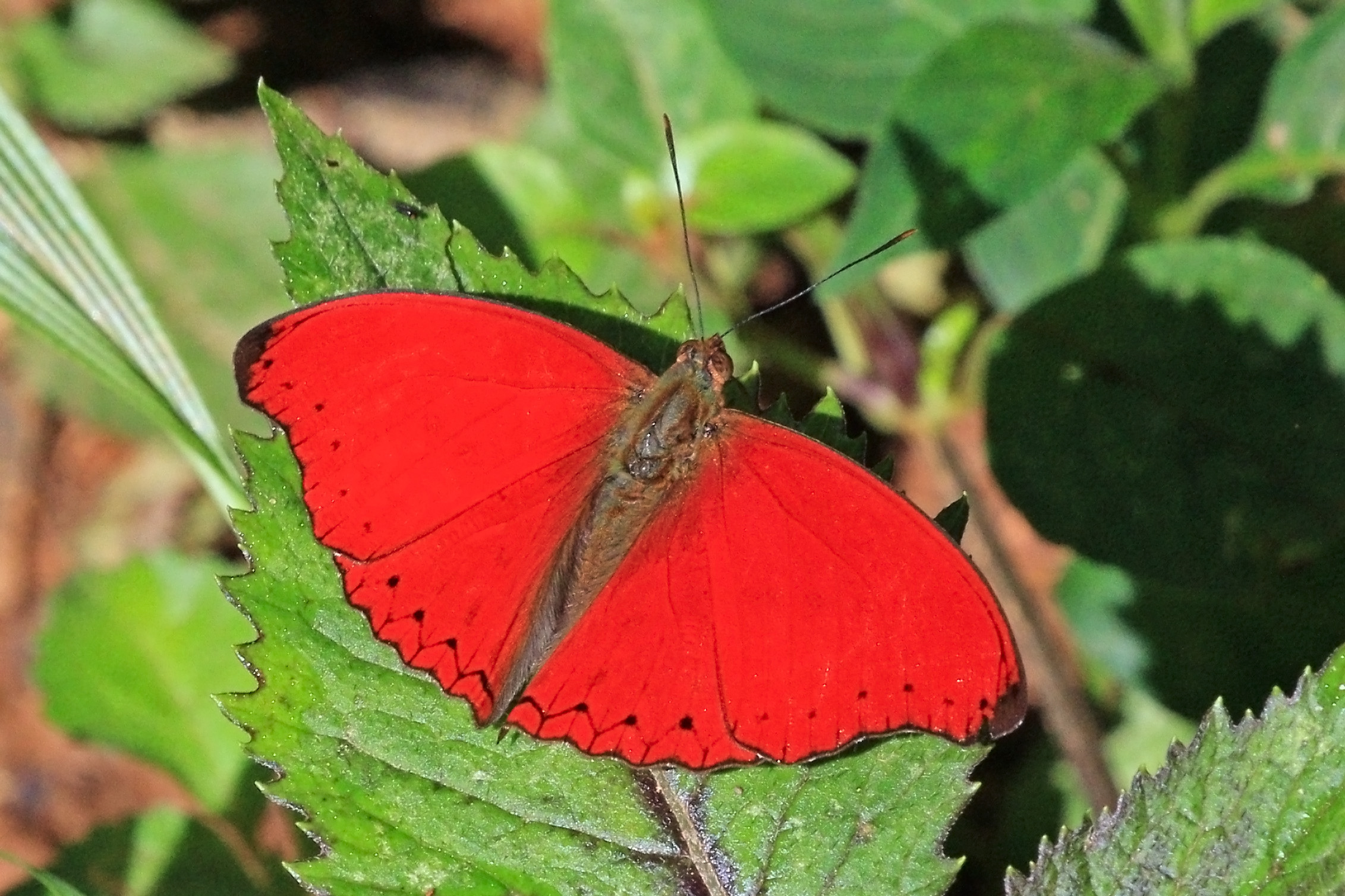
- C. hobarti
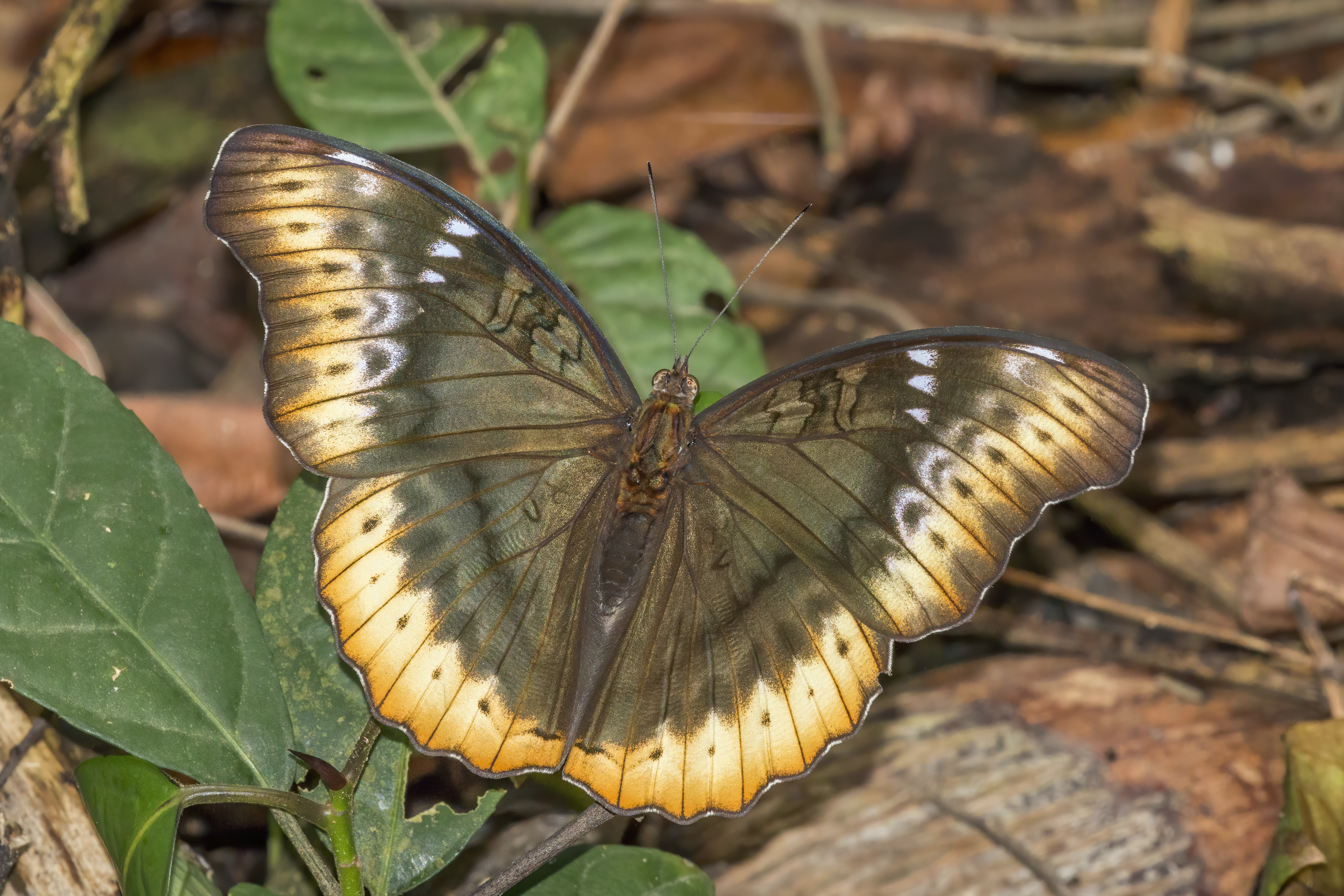
- female C. fumana Ghana

Scientific classification
- Domain: Eukaryota
- Kingdom: Animalia
- Phylum: Arthropoda
- Class: Insecta
- Order: Lepidoptera
- Family: Nymphalidae
- Subfamily: Limenitidinae
- Tribe: Limenitidini
- Genus: Cymothoe; Hübner, [1819]

Synonyms
- Pallene Doubleday, [1848]; Eupithes Westwood, [1850]; Paradiadema Distant, [1880]

= Cymothoe (butterfly) =

Genus of brush-footed butterflies

Cymothoe is a genus of butterflies in the subfamily Limenitidinae, the admirals and relatives. They are known commonly as gliders. The genus is distributed in the Afrotropical realm, where species are found mainly in forest habitat. mainly in the Guinean Forests of West Africa and the Congolian forests.

== Description ==
These are medium-large to large-size (wingspan 40-70 millimetres) often quite colourful butterflies. Species in this genus exhibit a number of different colours and patterns. Among the most remarkable are a number of species where the upperside is solid coloured bright red or orange. Another group is largely pale yellow; others deep ochreous yellow and chocolate brown or pure white.

== Biology ==
The larvae feed on various shrubs and trees. Recorded host genera include Rawsonia and Kiggelaria (Achariaceae), Fernandoa and Kigelia (Bignoniaceae), Vismia (Hypericaceae), Dovyalis (Salicaceae) and Rinorea (Violaceae). The adults spend most of their time in the canopy but also seek out sunlit spots between the trees and feed on decaying vegetation on the forest floor.

== Taxonomy ==
These butterflies exhibit sexual dimorphism. Individuals can also be variable within a species, especially females. The females of C. caenis, for example, are so variable that authorities have described 20 different forms of the species based on their differences.

The sister genus is Harma. The type species of the genus is Papilio althea Cramer.

== Species groups ==
Defining species groups is a convenient way of subdividing well-defined genera with a large number of recognized species. Cymothoe species are so arranged in assemblages called "species groups" but (not superspecies, but an informal phenetic arrangement). These may or may not be clades. As molecular phylogenetic studies continue, lineages distinct enough to warrant some formal degree of recognition become evident and new groupings are suggested, but consistent ranking remains a problem.

== Species ==
There are about 75 known species.

Listed alphabetically within species groups:

- The oemilius species group
  - Cymothoe oemilius (Doumet, 1859)
- The hyarbita species group
  - Cymothoe hyarbita (Hewitson, [1866])
  - Cymothoe reinholdi (Plötz, 1880)
- The lucasi species group
  - Cymothoe egesta (Cramer, 1775)
  - Cymothoe lucasii (Doumet, 1859)
  - Cymothoe megaesta Staudinger, 1889
  - Cymothoe owassae Schultze, 1916
- Unknown species group
  - Cymothoe orphnina Karsch, 1894
- The lurida species group
  - Cymothoe colmanti Aurivillius, 1898
  - Cymothoe hypatha (Hewitson, 1866)
  - Cymothoe lurida (Butler, 1871)
- Unknown species group
  - Cymothoe cyclades (Ward, 1871)
  - Cymothoe fontainei Overlaet, 1952
  - Cymothoe heliada (Hewitson, 1874)
  - Cymothoe herminia Grose-Smith, 1887
  - Cymothoe hesiodina Schultze, 1908
  - Cymothoe hesiodotus Staudinger, 1889
  - Cymothoe howarthi Rydon, 1981
  - Cymothoe isiro Rydon, 1981
  - Cymothoe ochreata Grose-Smith, 1890
  - Cymothoe sassiana Schouteden, 1912
  - Cymothoe weymeri Suffert, 1904
- The fumana species group
  - Cymothoe fumana (Westwood, 1850)
  - Cymothoe haynae Dewitz, 1886
- Unknown species group
  - Cymothoe althea (Cramer, [1776])
  - Cymothoe amenides (Hewitson, 1874)
  - Cymothoe capella (Ward, 1871)
  - Cymothoe caprina Aurivillius, 1897
  - Cymothoe consanguis Aurivillius, 1896
  - Cymothoe coranus (Grose-Smith, 1889)
  - Cymothoe eris Aurivillius, 1896
- The caenis species group
  - Cymothoe alcimeda (Godart, [1824])
  - Cymothoe alticola Libert & Collins, 1997
  - Cymothoe caenis (Drury, [1773])
  - Cymothoe jodutta (Westwood, 1850)
  - Cymothoe teita van Someren, 1939
- Unknown species group
  - Cymothoe adela Staudinger, 1889
  - Cymothoe altisidora (Hewitson, 1869)
  - Cymothoe amaniensis Rydon, 1980
  - Cymothoe angulifascia Aurivillius, 1897
  - Cymothoe aubergeri Plantrou, 1977
  - Cymothoe aurivillii Staudinger, 1899
  - Cymothoe beckeri (Herrich-Schäffer, [1853])
  - Cymothoe collarti Overlaet, 1942
  - Cymothoe collinsi Rydon, 1980
  - Cymothoe cottrelli Rydon, 1980
  - Cymothoe dujardini Viette, 1971
  - Cymothoe indamora Hewitson, 1866
  - Cymothoe lambertoni Oberthür, 1923
  - Cymothoe magambae Rydon, 1980
  - Cymothoe melanjae Bethune-Baker, 1926
  - Cymothoe vumbui Bethune-Baker, 1926
  - Cymothoe zenkeri Richelmann, 1913
  - Cymothoe zombana Bethune-Baker, 1926
- The sangaris species group
  - Cymothoe anitorgis (Hewitson, 1874)
  - Cymothoe aramis (Hewitson, 1865)
  - Cymothoe coccinata (Hewitson, 1874)
  - Cymothoe euthalioides Kirby, 1889
  - Cymothoe harmilla (Hewitson, 1874)
  - Cymothoe hobarti Butler, 1900
  - Cymothoe magnus Joicey & Talbot, 1928
  - Cymothoe ogova (Plötz, 1880)
  - Cymothoe sangaris (Godart, 1824)
- Unknown species group
  - Cymothoe arcuata Overlaet, 1945
  - Cymothoe crocea Schultze, 1917
  - Cymothoe distincta Overlaet, 1944
  - Cymothoe excelsa Neustetter, 1912
  - Cymothoe haimodia (Grose-Smith, 1887)
  - Cymothoe hartigi Belcastro, 1990
  - Cymothoe mabillei Overlaet, 1944
  - Cymothoe meridionalis Overlaet, 1944
  - Cymothoe preussi Staudinger, 1889
  - Cymothoe radialis Gaede, 1916
  - Cymothoe rebeli Neustetter, 1912
  - Cymothoe reginaeelisabethae Holland, 1920
