= Cymothoe rebeli =

Scientific classification
- Kingdom: Animalia
- Phylum: Arthropoda
- Class: Insecta
- Order: Lepidoptera
- Family: Nymphalidae
- Genus: Cymothoe
- Species: C. rebeli

Binomial name
- Cymothoe rebeli Neustetter, 1912

Species of butterfly

Cymothoe rebeli is a butterfly in the family Nymphalidae. It is found in Cameroon.
