= Cymothoe collinsi =

Scientific classification
- Kingdom: Animalia
- Phylum: Arthropoda
- Class: Insecta
- Order: Lepidoptera
- Family: Nymphalidae
- Genus: Cymothoe
- Species: C. collinsi

Binomial name
- Cymothoe collinsi Rydon, 1980

Species of butterfly

Cymothoe collinsi is a butterfly in the family Nymphalidae. It is found in northern Tanzania. The habitat consists of montane forests at an altitude of about 1,800 meters.
