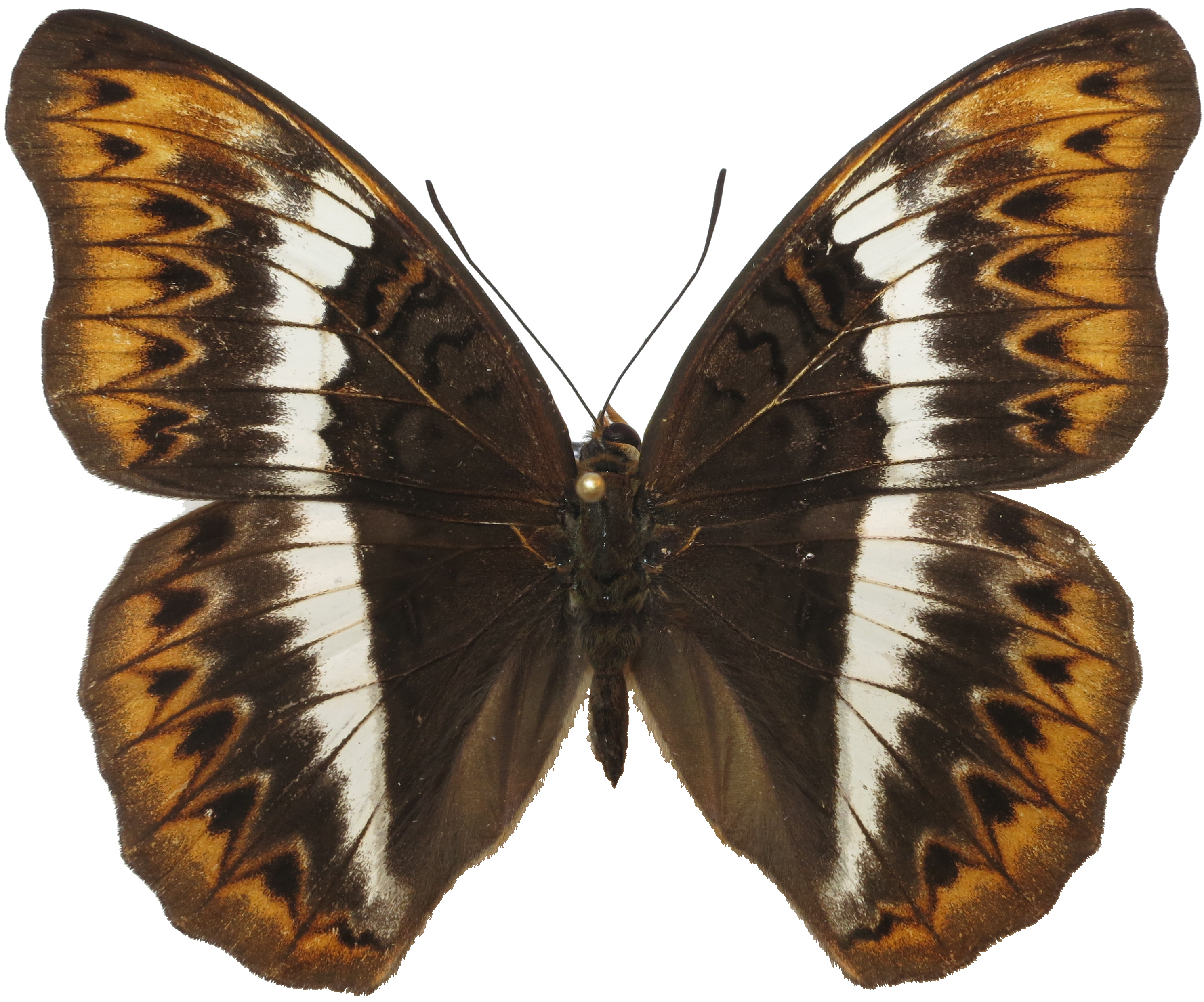
- Male, Boukoko, Lobaye, CAR

Conservation status
- Least Concern (IUCN 3.1)

Scientific classification
- Kingdom: Animalia
- Phylum: Arthropoda
- Class: Insecta
- Order: Lepidoptera
- Family: Nymphalidae
- Genus: Cymothoe
- Species: C. weymeri

Binomial name
- Cymothoe weymeri Suffert, 1904

Synonyms
- Cymothoe weymeri ab. defasciatus Rydon, 1981

= Cymothoe weymeri =

Weymer's glider

Species of butterfly

Cymothoe weymeri, or Weymer's glider, is a butterfly in the family Nymphalidae. It is found in Liberia, Ivory Coast, Ghana, Nigeria, Cameroon, the Central African Republic and the Democratic Republic of the Congo. The habitat consists of forests.

The larvae feed on Flacourtiaceae species.

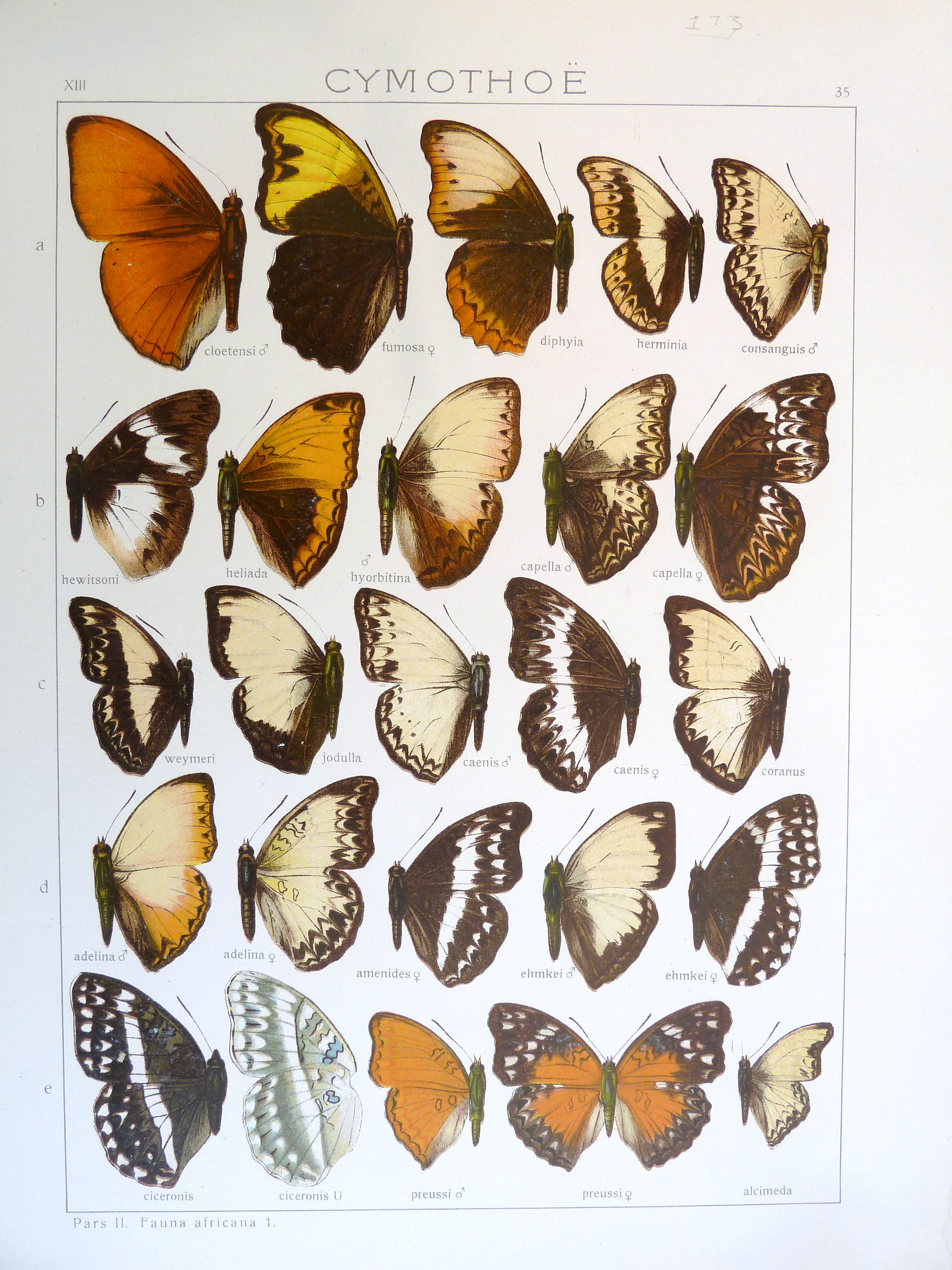
Cymothoe weymeri in Adalbert Seitz's Fauna Africana

== Subspecies ==
- Cymothoe weymeri weymeri (Nigeria: south and the Cross River loop, Cameroon, Central African Republic, northern Democratic Republic of the Congo)
- Cymothoe weymeri mulatta Belcastro, 1990 (Liberia, Ivory Coast, Ghana)
