= Cymothoe owassae =

Scientific classification
- Kingdom: Animalia
- Phylum: Arthropoda
- Class: Insecta
- Order: Lepidoptera
- Family: Nymphalidae
- Genus: Cymothoe
- Species: C. owassae

Binomial name
- Cymothoe owassae Schultze, 1916

Species of butterfly

Cymothoe owassae is a butterfly in the family Nymphalidae. It is found on Bioko an island off the west coast of Africa.
