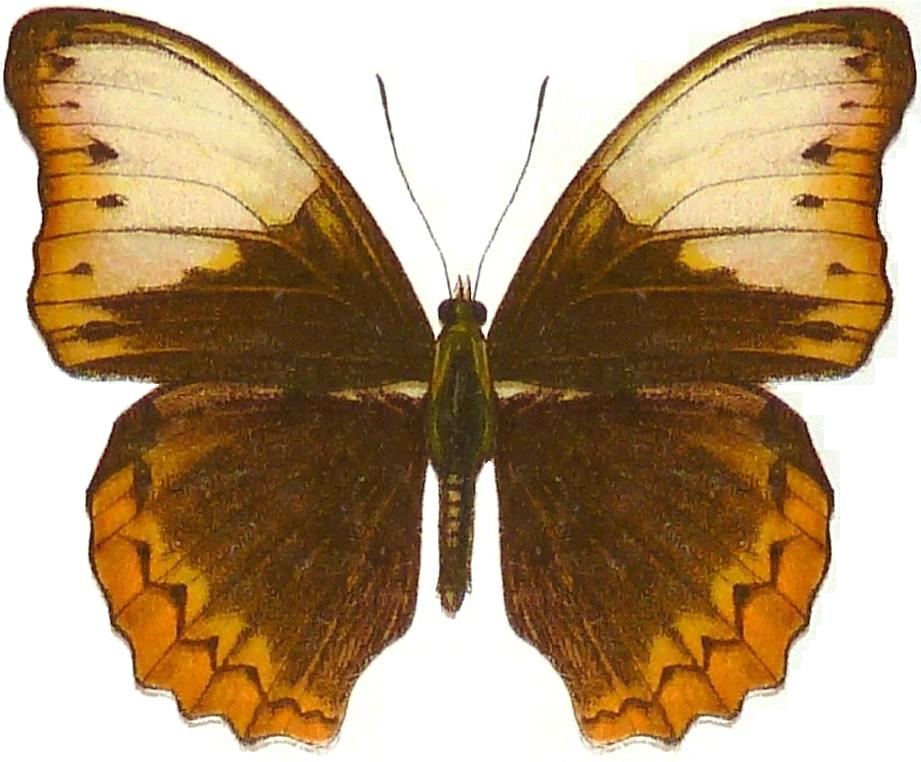
- C. h. subsp. diphyia in Seitz's Fauna Africana
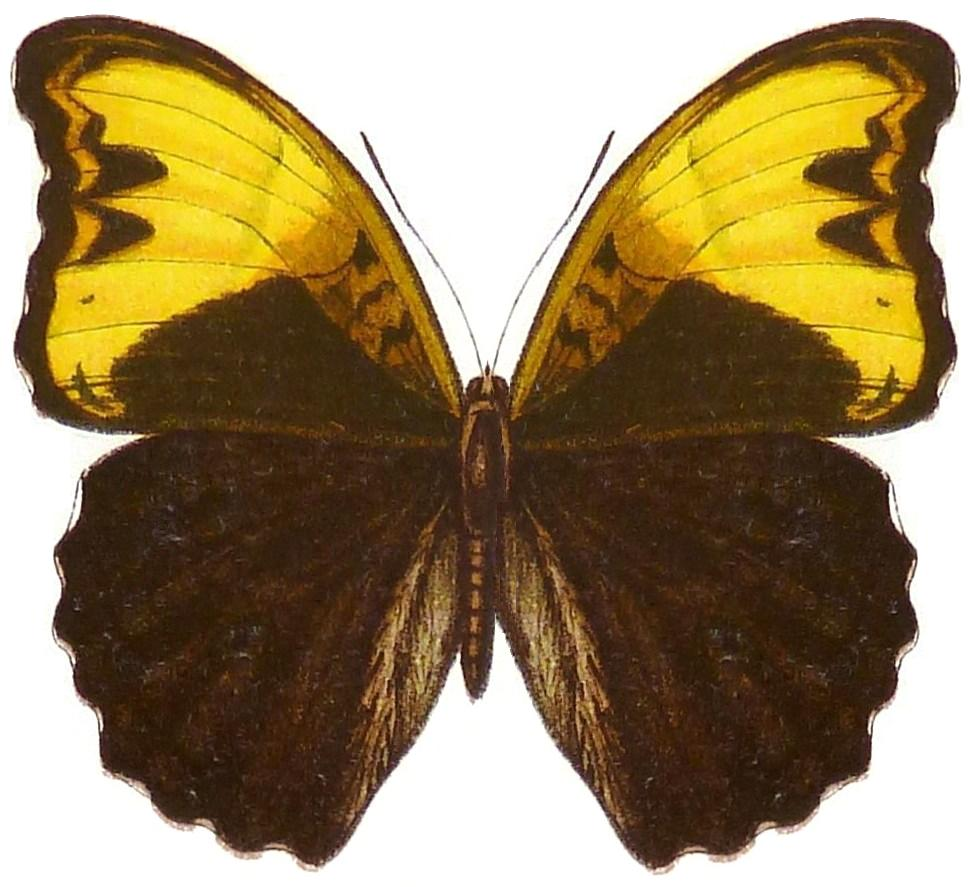
- Female C. h. subsp. fumosa in Seitz's Fauna Africana

Conservation status
- Least Concern (IUCN 3.1)

Scientific classification
- Kingdom: Animalia
- Phylum: Arthropoda
- Class: Insecta
- Order: Lepidoptera
- Family: Nymphalidae
- Genus: Cymothoe
- Species: C. haynae

Binomial name
- Cymothoe haynae Dewitz, 1887

Synonyms
- Cymothoe haynae umbrosa Overlaet, 1942; Cymothoe haynae umbrosa f. luazae Overlaet, 1942; Cymothoe haynae umbrosa f. decorata Overlaet, 1942; Cymothoe haynae umbrosa f. aurantiana Overlaet, 1942; Cymothoe diphyia Karsch, 1894; Cymothoe diphyia f. kamitugensis Dufrane, 1945; Cymothoe fumosa Staudinger, 1896; Cymothoe superba Aurivillius, 1899; Cymothoe vosiana Overlaet, 1942

= Cymothoe haynae =

Species of butterfly

Cymothoe haynae is a butterfly in the family Nymphalidae. It is found in Cameroon, Gabon, the Republic of the Congo, the Central African Republic, the DRC and Uganda.

== Subspecies ==
- C. h. haynae (southern Democratic Republic of the Congo)
- C. h. diphyia Karsch, 1894 (eastern Cameroon, northern Congo, Central African Republic, western Uganda, Democratic Republic of the Congo: Ituri, Ruwenzori and Kivu)
- C. h. fumosa Staudinger, 1896 (Democratic Republic of the Congo)
- C. h. superba Aurivillius, 1899 (southern and western Cameroon, Gabon)
- C. h. vosiana Overlaet, 1942 (Democratic Republic of the Congo: south-central to the Kasai Valley)
