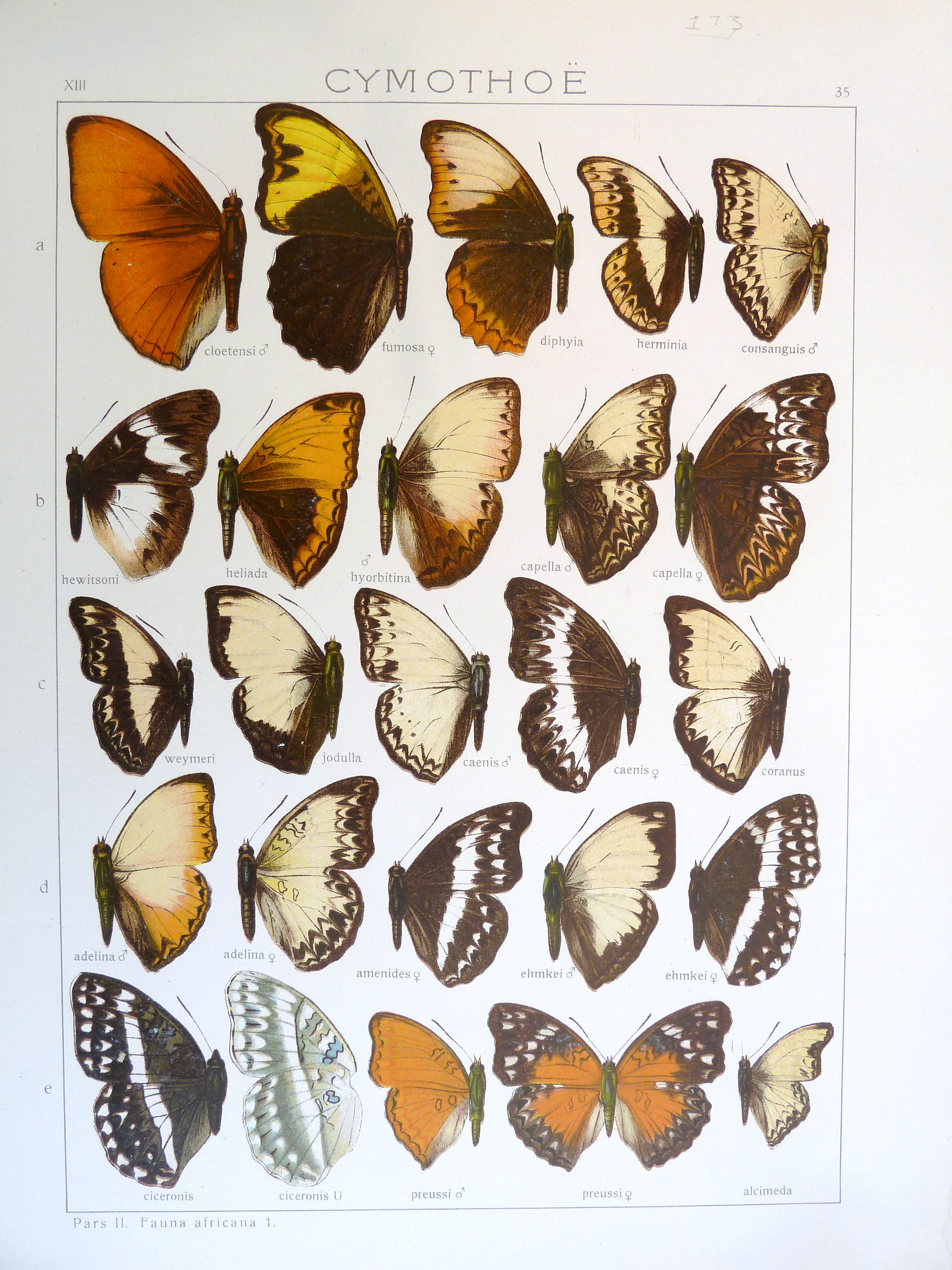
- In Adalbert Seitz's Fauna Africana

Conservation status
- Least Concern (IUCN 3.1)

Scientific classification
- Kingdom: Animalia
- Phylum: Arthropoda
- Class: Insecta
- Order: Lepidoptera
- Family: Nymphalidae
- Genus: Cymothoe
- Species: C. consanguis

Binomial name
- Cymothoe consanguis Aurivillius, 1896

= Cymothoe consanguis =

Cream glider

Species of butterfly

Cymothoe consanguis, the cream glider, is a butterfly in the family Nymphalidae. It is found in Nigeria (the Cross River loop) and Cameroon. Its habitat consists of forests.

Adults feed on fallen fruit.
