= Cymothoe adela =

Scientific classification
- Kingdom: Animalia
- Phylum: Arthropoda
- Class: Insecta
- Order: Lepidoptera
- Family: Nymphalidae
- Genus: Cymothoe
- Species: C. adela

Binomial name
- Cymothoe adela Staudinger, 1890

Synonyms
- Cymothoe marginata Crowley, 1890

Species of butterfly

Cymothoe adela, the Sierra Leone yellow glider, is a butterfly in the family Nymphalidae. It is found in Guinea and Sierra Leone. The habitat consists of forests.
