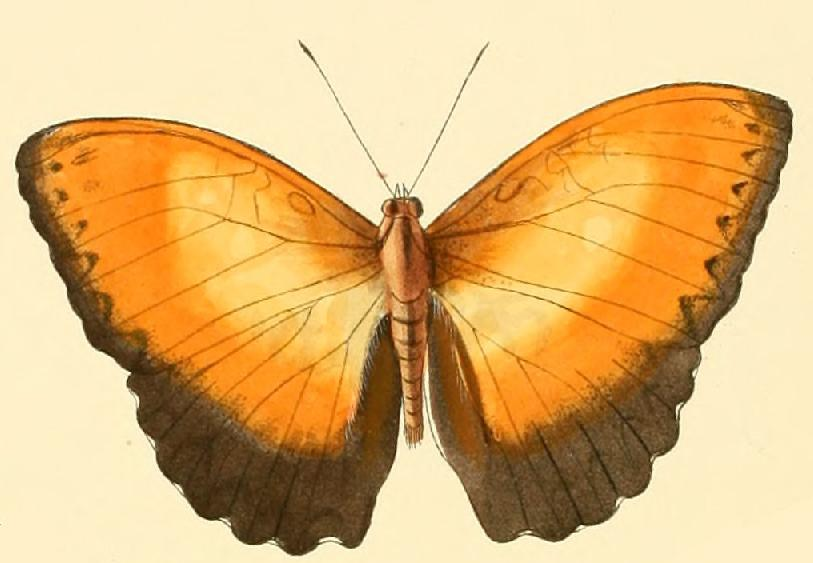

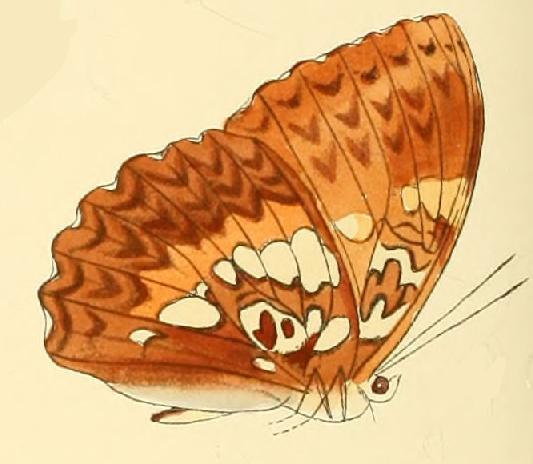

Scientific classification
- Kingdom: Animalia
- Phylum: Arthropoda
- Class: Insecta
- Order: Lepidoptera
- Family: Nymphalidae
- Genus: Cymothoe
- Species: C. beckeri

Binomial name
- Cymothoe beckeri (Herrich-Schaeffer, 1858)

Synonyms
- Diadema beckeri Herrich-Schaeffer, 1858; Harma theodota Hewitson, 1874; Cymothoe theocranta Karsch, 1894; Cymothoe beckeri ab. aurora Overlaet, 1952; Harma marmorata Sharpe, 1904

= Cymothoe beckeri =

Becker's creamy yellow glider

Species of butterfly

Cymothoe beckeri, or Becker's creamy yellow glider, is a butterfly in the family Nymphalidae. It is found in Nigeria, Cameroon, Gabon, the Republic of the Congo, Angola, the Democratic Republic of the Congo, the Central African Republic and Uganda. The habitat consists of forests.

Females mimic toxic day-flying moths, such as Oetroeda planax and Nytemera hesperia. Both sexes feed on fallen fruit.

The larvae feed on Macaranga and Caloncoba species.

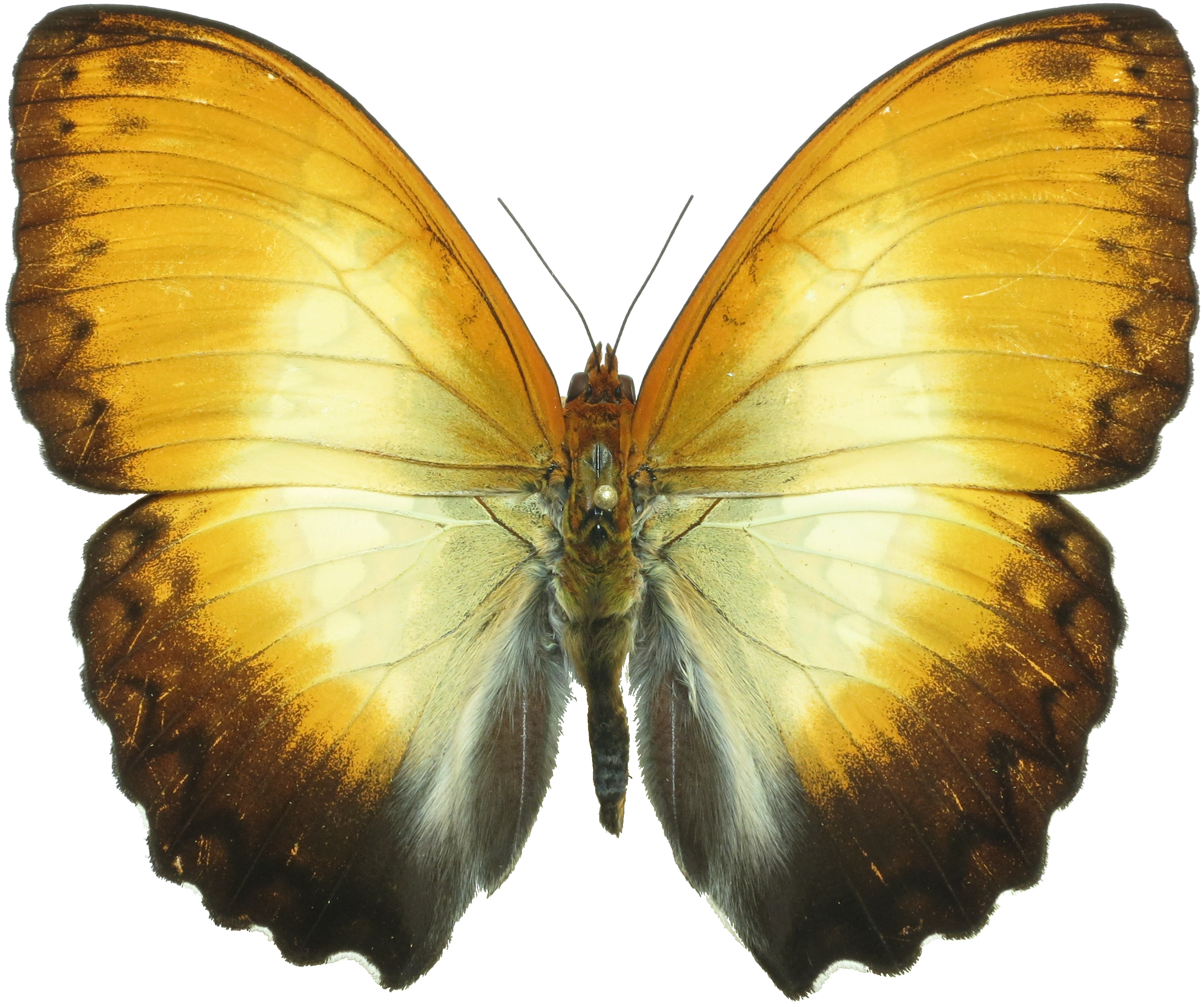
Male from Mbalmayo, Cameroon

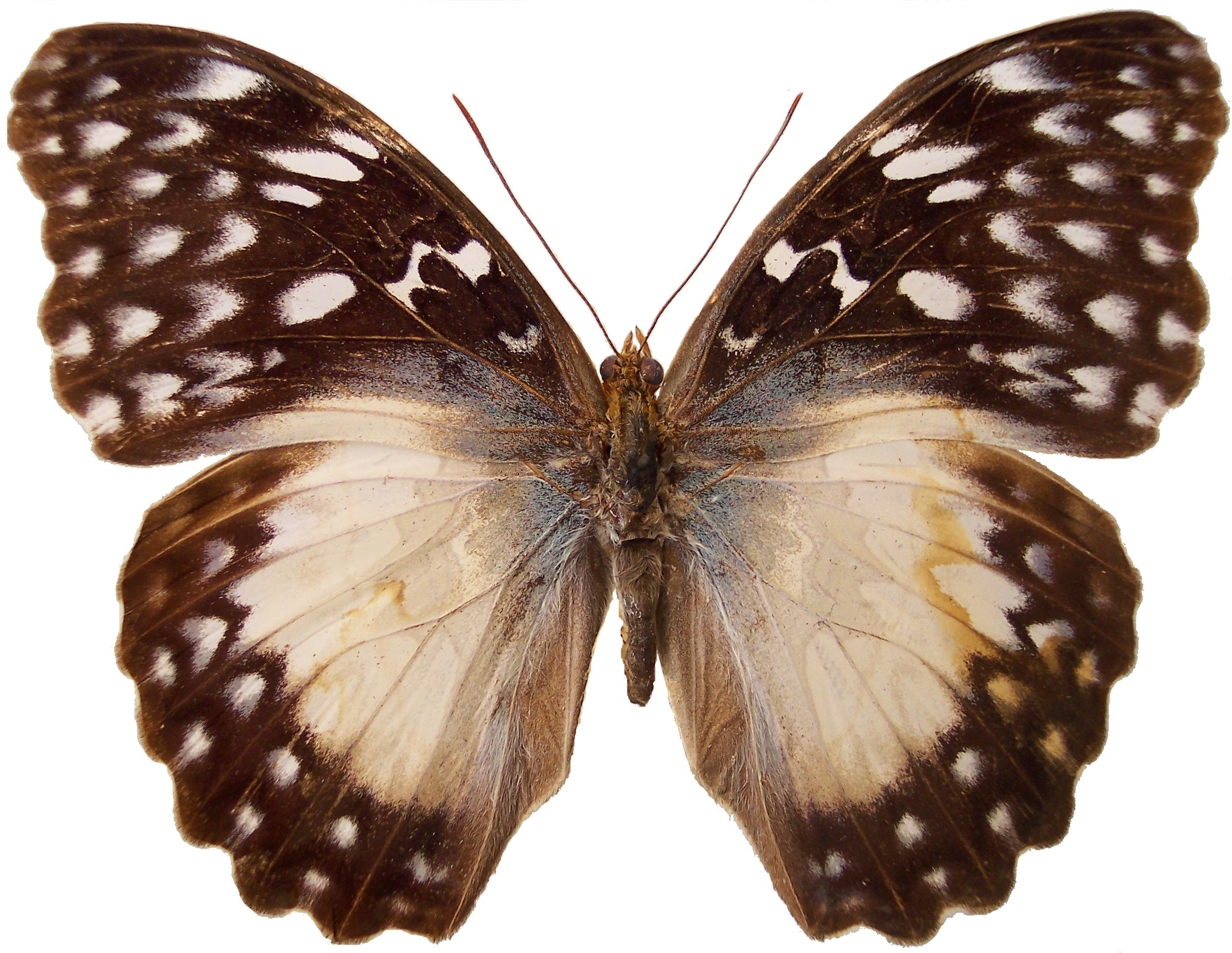

== Subspecies ==
- Cymothoe beckeri beckeri (Nigeria: south and the Cross River loop, Cameroon, Gabon, Congo, Angola, western Democratic Republic of the Congo)
- Cymothoe beckeri theodosia Staudinger, 1890 (eastern Democratic Republic of the Congo, Central African Republic, western Uganda)
