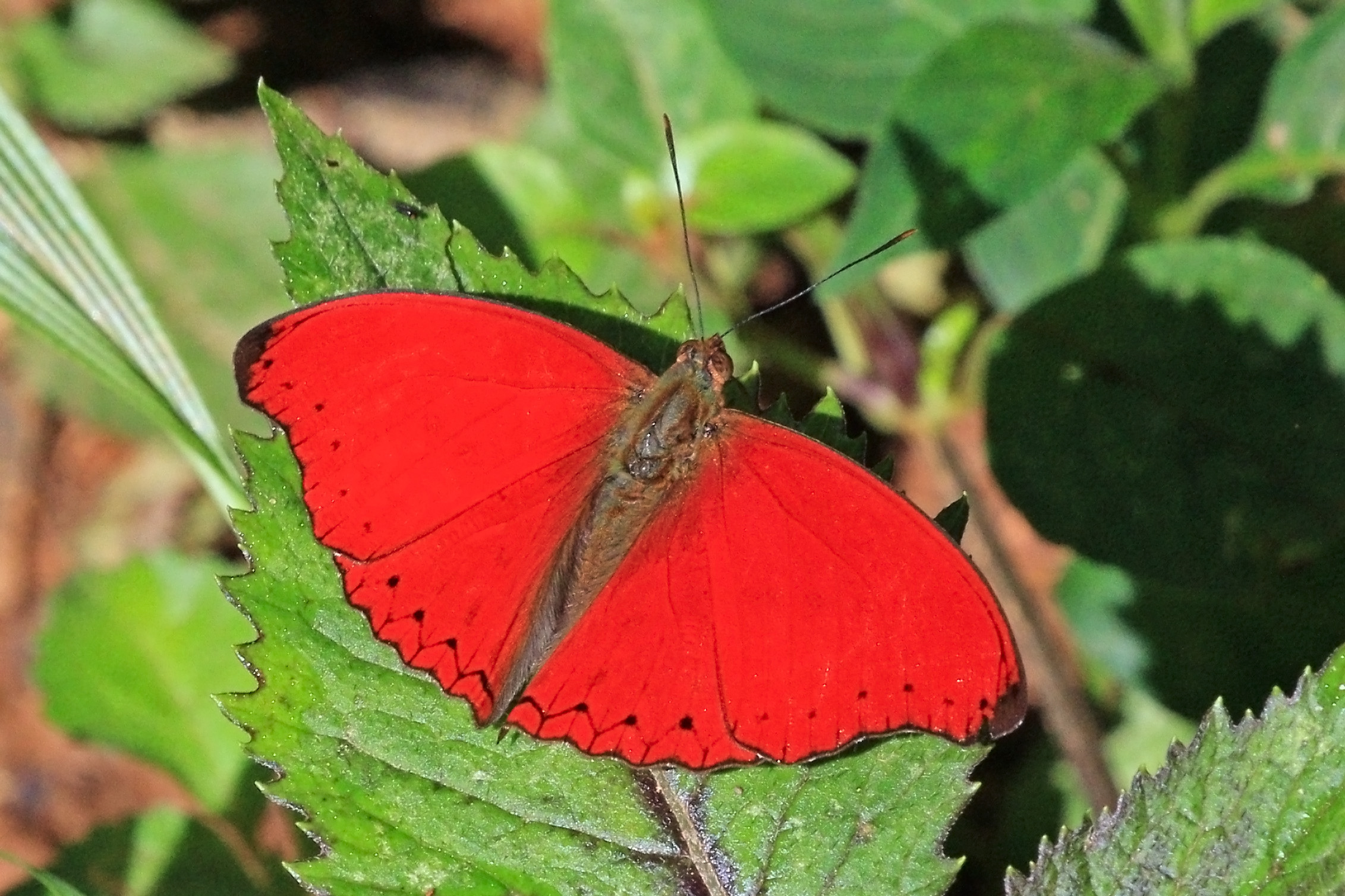
- Kakamega Forest, Kenya

Scientific classification
- Domain: Eukaryota
- Kingdom: Animalia
- Phylum: Arthropoda
- Class: Insecta
- Order: Lepidoptera
- Family: Nymphalidae
- Genus: Cymothoe
- Species: C. hobarti

Binomial name
- Cymothoe hobarti Butler, 1900

= Cymothoe hobarti =

Species of butterfly

Cymothoe hobarti, or Hobart's red glider, is a species of butterfly of the family Nymphalidae. It is found in the Democratic Republic of the Congo, the Central African Republic, Uganda, Kenya and Tanzania. The habitat consists of lowland to sub-montane forests.

Males mud-puddle and both sexes are attracted to fermenting fruit.

The larvae feed on Rinorea species.

== Subspecies ==
The following subspecies are recognised:

- Cymothoe hobarti hobarti (Uganda, western Kenya, north-western Tanzania)
- Cymothoe hobarti mwamikazi Overlaet, 1952 (Democratic Republic of the Congo: Kivu, Kibali, Ituri)
- Cymothoe hobarti candidata Overlaet, 1954 (northern Democratic Republic of the Congo, southern Central African Republic)
- Cymothoe hobarti lactanganyikae Collins, 1990 (western Tanzania)

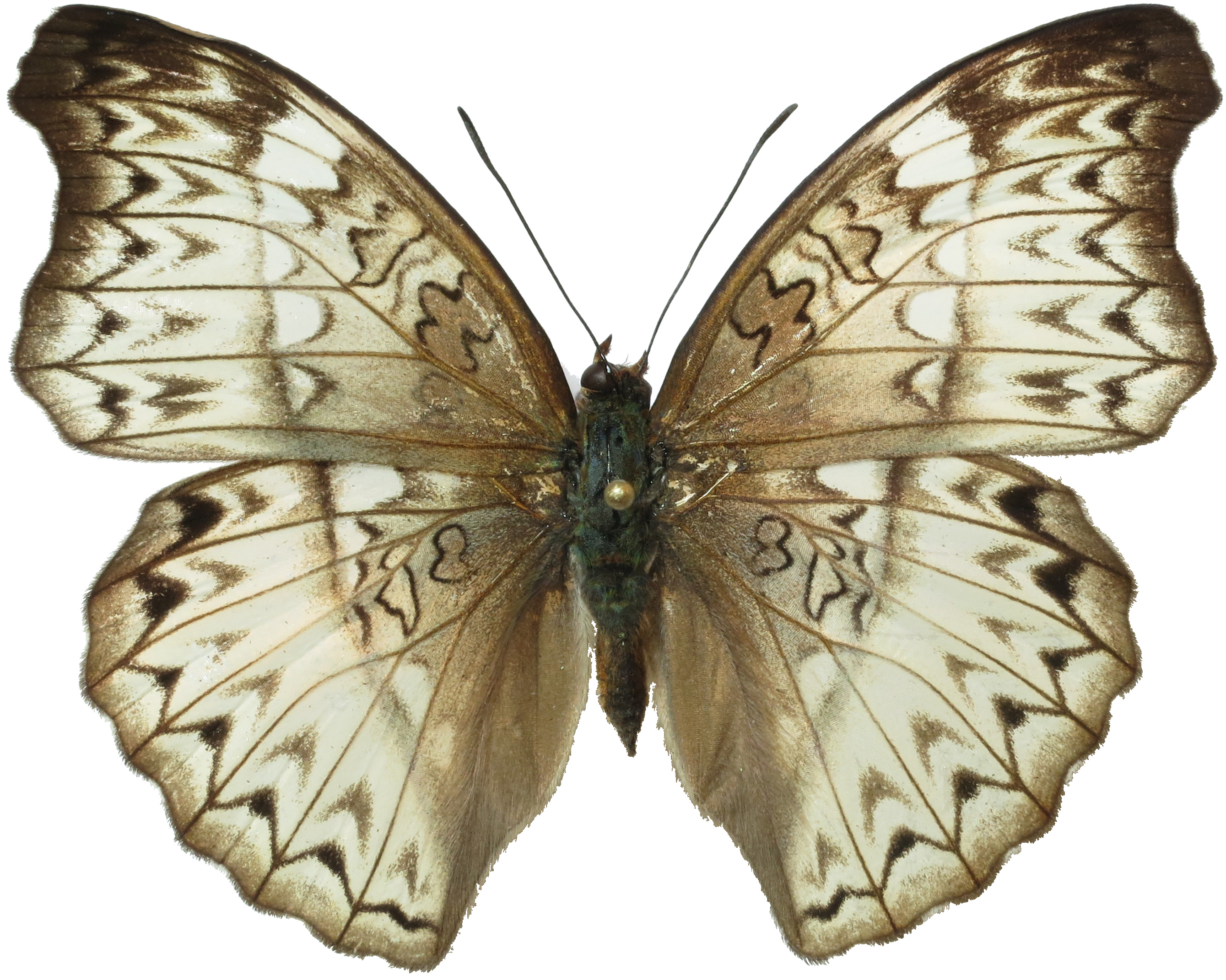
Cymothoe hobarti hobarti female, Kakamega, Kenya
