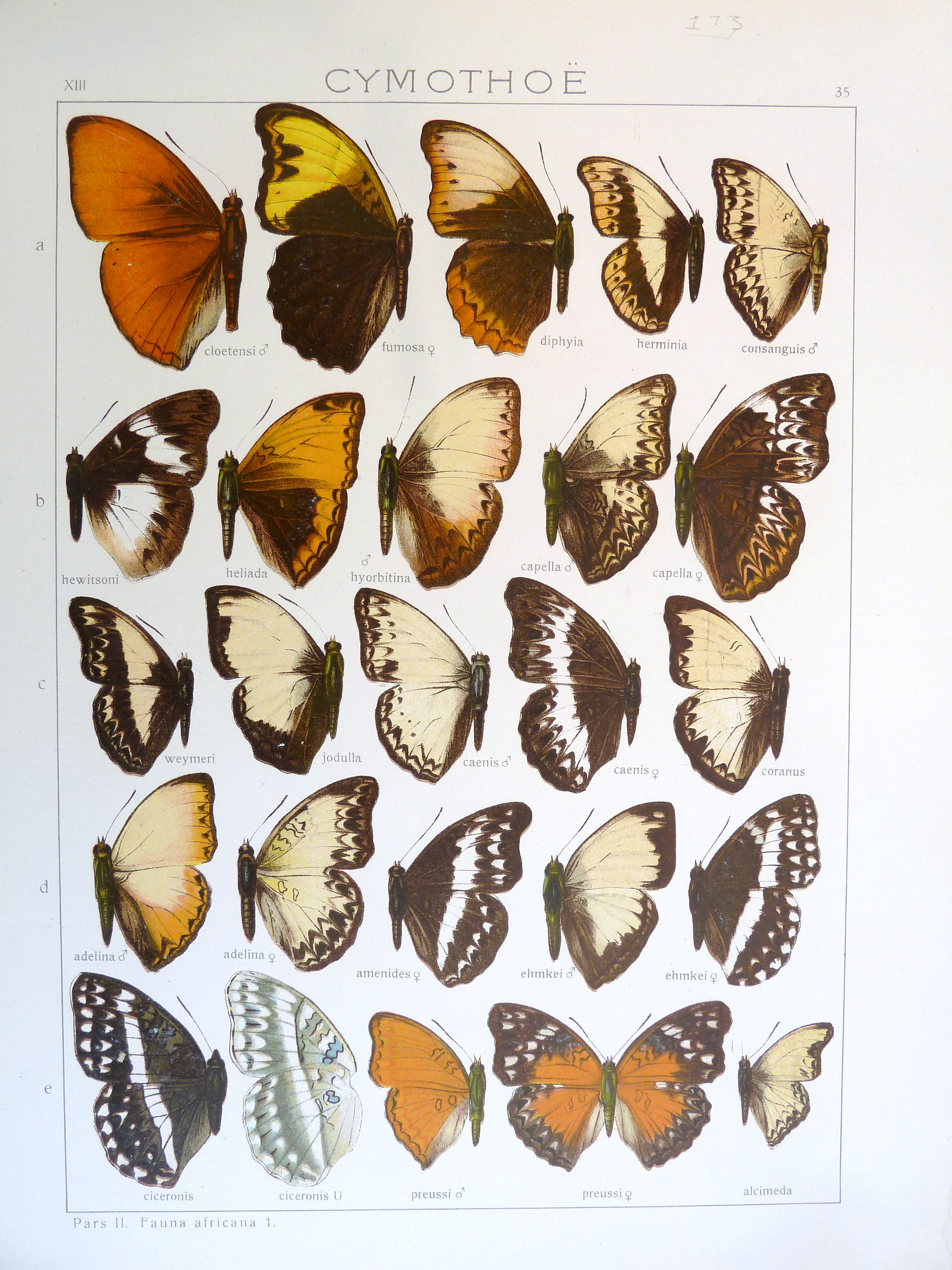
- In Adalbert Seitz's Fauna Africana

Scientific classification
- Kingdom: Animalia
- Phylum: Arthropoda
- Clade: Pancrustacea
- Class: Insecta
- Order: Lepidoptera
- Family: Nymphalidae
- Genus: Cymothoe
- Species: C. amenides

Binomial name
- Cymothoe amenides (Hewitson, 1874)

Synonyms
- Harma amenides Hewitson, 1874; Cymothoe caenis f. mundamensis Overlaet, 1942

= Cymothoe amenides =

Species of butterfly

Cymothoe amenides is a butterfly in the family Nymphalidae. It is found in Cameroon and Gabon.
