= Cymothoe vumbui =

Scientific classification
- Kingdom: Animalia
- Phylum: Arthropoda
- Class: Insecta
- Order: Lepidoptera
- Family: Nymphalidae
- Genus: Cymothoe
- Species: C. vumbui

Binomial name
- Cymothoe vumbui Bethune-Baker, 1926

Species of butterfly

Cymothoe vumbui, the Vumba glider, is a butterfly in the family Nymphalidae. It is found in eastern Zimbabwe and Mozambique. The habitat consists of montane forests.

Adult males mud-puddle. Both sexes are attracted to fermenting fruit. There are two generations per year with adults on wing from September to November and again from February to April.

The larvae feed on Rawsonia lucida.
