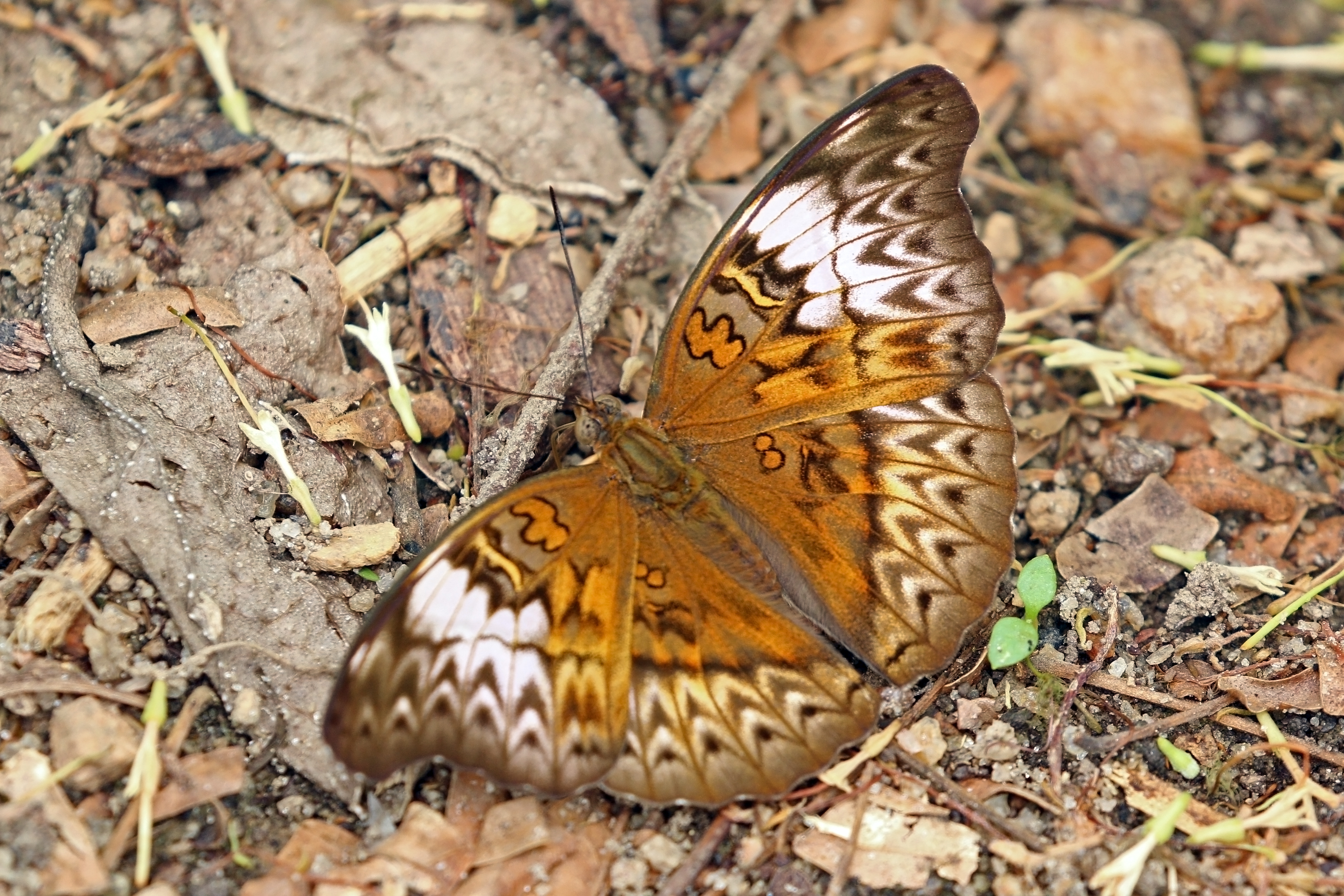
- Female, Ghana

Scientific classification
- Kingdom: Animalia
- Phylum: Arthropoda
- Clade: Pancrustacea
- Class: Insecta
- Order: Lepidoptera
- Family: Nymphalidae
- Genus: Cymothoe
- Species: C. aubergeri

Binomial name
- Cymothoe aubergeri Plantrou, 1977

= Cymothoe aubergeri =

Species of butterfly

Cymothoe aubergeri, or Auberger's yellow glider, is a butterfly in the family Nymphalidae. It is found in Guinea, eastern Ivory Coast and Ghana. The habitat consists of forests.

Torben Larsen developed a species numbering system for his 2005 publication Butterflies of West Africa. This species is #858. The 'Larsen' numbers have since been used with permission in A Sharp Eye on Butterflies of Ghana.
