= Cymothoe howarthi =

Scientific classification
- Kingdom: Animalia
- Phylum: Arthropoda
- Class: Insecta
- Order: Lepidoptera
- Family: Nymphalidae
- Genus: Cymothoe
- Species: C. howarthi

Binomial name
- Cymothoe howarthi Rydon, 1981

Species of butterfly

Cymothoe howarthi is a butterfly in the family Nymphalidae. It is found in Kivu in the Democratic Republic of the Congo.
