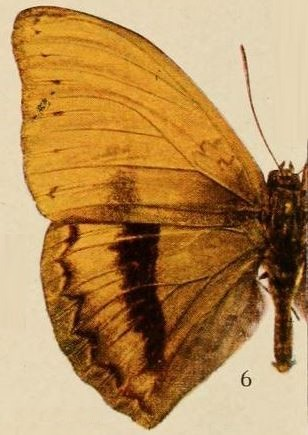

Scientific classification
- Kingdom: Animalia
- Phylum: Arthropoda
- Class: Insecta
- Order: Lepidoptera
- Family: Nymphalidae
- Genus: Cymothoe
- Species: C. cyclades

Binomial name
- Cymothoe cyclades (Ward, 1871)

Synonyms
- Harma cyclades Ward, 1871; Cymothoe bonnyi Grose-Smith, 1890

= Cymothoe cyclades =

Species of butterfly

Cymothoe cyclades is a butterfly in the family Nymphalidae. It is found in Cameroon and the eastern part of the Democratic Republic of the Congo.
