= Cymothoe distincta =

Scientific classification
- Kingdom: Animalia
- Phylum: Arthropoda
- Class: Insecta
- Order: Lepidoptera
- Family: Nymphalidae
- Genus: Cymothoe
- Species: C. distincta

Binomial name
- Cymothoe distincta Overlaet, 1944

Synonyms
- Cymothoe excelsior distincta f. kambazae Overlaet, 1944; Cymothoe excelsior trolliae Overlaet, 1944; Cymothoe excelsior distincta f. caeca Overlaet, 1944; Cymothoe aramoides Overlaet, 1944; Cymothoe excelsior f. neustetteri Overlaet, 1945; Cymothoe excelsior f. kivuensis Overlaet, 1944

Species of butterfly

Cymothoe distincta is a butterfly in the family Nymphalidae. It is found in Cameroon, the Republic of the Congo, the Democratic Republic of the Congo and Uganda.

== Subspecies ==
- Cymothoe distincta distincta (Cameroon, Congo, Democratic Republic of the Congo)
- Cymothoe distincta kivuensis Overlaet, 1952 (Democratic Republic of the Congo: Kivu, Uganda: west to the Bwamba Valley)
