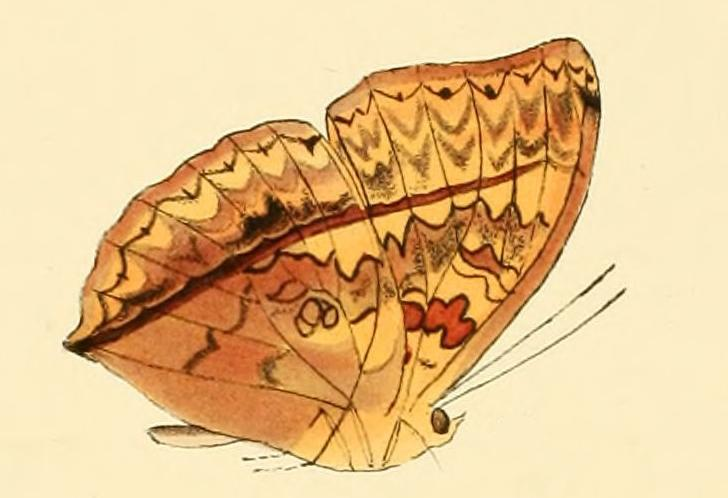

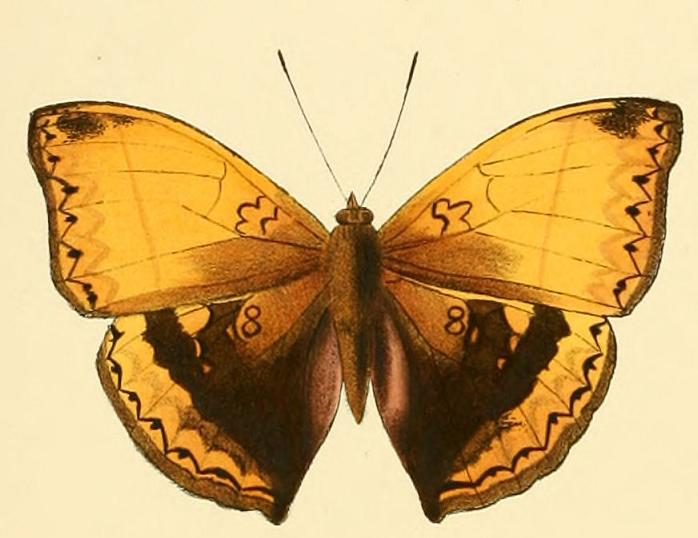

Scientific classification
- Kingdom: Animalia
- Phylum: Arthropoda
- Class: Insecta
- Order: Lepidoptera
- Family: Nymphalidae
- Genus: Cymothoe
- Species: C. heliada

Binomial name
- Cymothoe heliada (Hewitson, 1874)

Synonyms
- Harma heliada Hewitson, 1874; Cymothoe heliada var. heliadina Schultze, 1916; Cymothoe heliada f. liberatorum Overlaet, 1945; Cymothoe mutshindji Overlaet, 1940; Cymothoe mutshindji f. luizana Overlaet, 1940; Cymothoe heliada seydeli Overlaet, 1945

= Cymothoe heliada =

Species of butterfly

Cymothoe heliada is a butterfly in the family Nymphalidae. It is found in Nigeria, Cameroon, the Republic of the Congo and the Democratic Republic of the Congo. The habitat consists of forests.

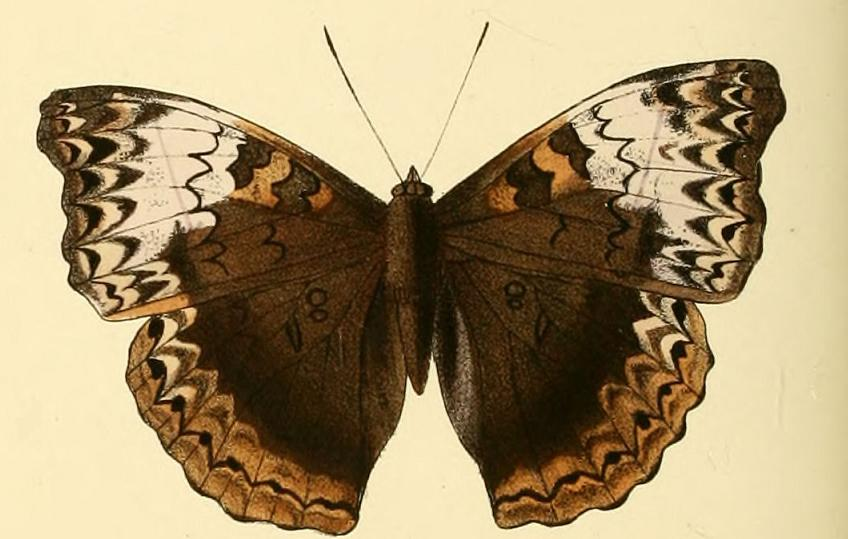

The larvae feed on Rinorea species.

== Subspecies ==
- Cymothoe heliada heliada (Nigeria: Cross River loop, Cameroon, Congo)
- Cymothoe heliada liberatorum Overlaet, 1952 (Democratic Republic of the Congo: central to Sankuru)
- Cymothoe heliada mutshindji Overlaet, 1940 (Democratic Republic of the Congo: Lualaba, Kabinda)
