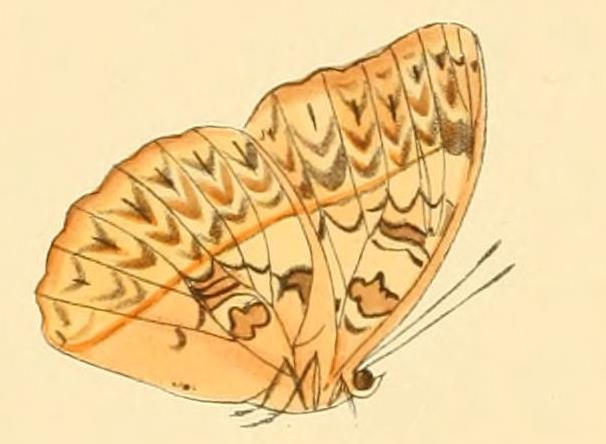

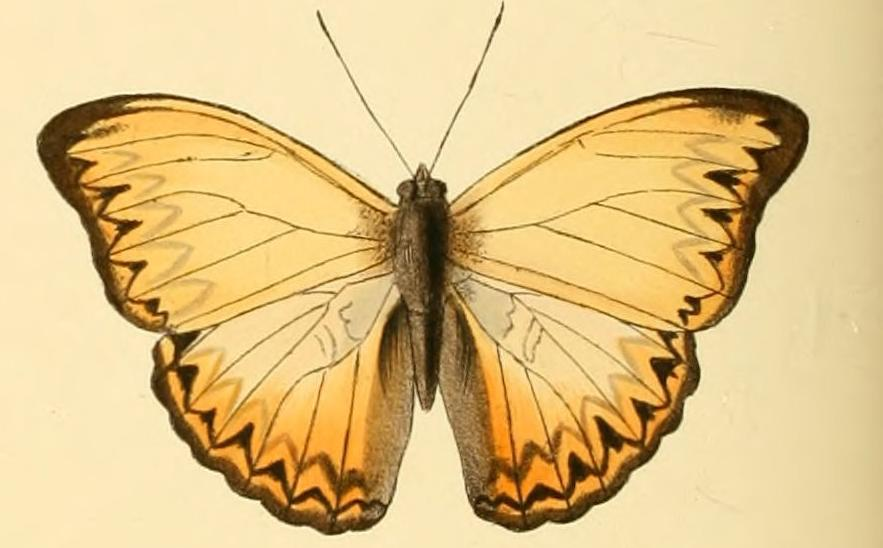

Scientific classification
- Kingdom: Animalia
- Phylum: Arthropoda
- Class: Insecta
- Order: Lepidoptera
- Family: Nymphalidae
- Genus: Cymothoe
- Species: C. altisidora

Binomial name
- Cymothoe altisidora (Hewitson, 1869)

Synonyms
- Harma altisidora Hewitson, 1869; Cymothoe lucretia Neustetter, 1916; Cymothoe altisidora f. verlainei Overlaet, 1940

= Cymothoe altisidora =

Species of butterfly

Cymothoe altisidora is a butterfly in the family Nymphalidae. It is found in Cameroon, the Republic of the Congo and the Democratic Republic of the Congo.
