= Cymothoe haimodia =

Scientific classification
- Kingdom: Animalia
- Phylum: Arthropoda
- Class: Insecta
- Order: Lepidoptera
- Family: Nymphalidae
- Genus: Cymothoe
- Species: C. haimodia

Binomial name
- Cymothoe haimodia (Grose-Smith, 1887)

Synonyms
- Harma haimodia Grose-Smith, 1887

Species of butterfly

Cymothoe haimodia, the haimodia red glider, is a butterfly in the family Nymphalidae. It is found in eastern Nigeria and Cameroon. The habitat consists of forests.

Females closely resemble moths of the genus Aletis, of which they might be mimics.

The larvae feed on Rinorea species.
