= Cymothoe teita =

Conservation status
- Endangered (IUCN 3.1)

Scientific classification
- Kingdom: Animalia
- Phylum: Arthropoda
- Class: Insecta
- Order: Lepidoptera
- Family: Nymphalidae
- Genus: Cymothoe
- Species: C. teita

Binomial name
- Cymothoe teita Van Someren, 1939

Species of butterfly

Cymothoe teita is a butterfly in the family Nymphalidae. It is an endangered species endemic to Kenya, from the south-eastern part of the country to the Teita Hills.
