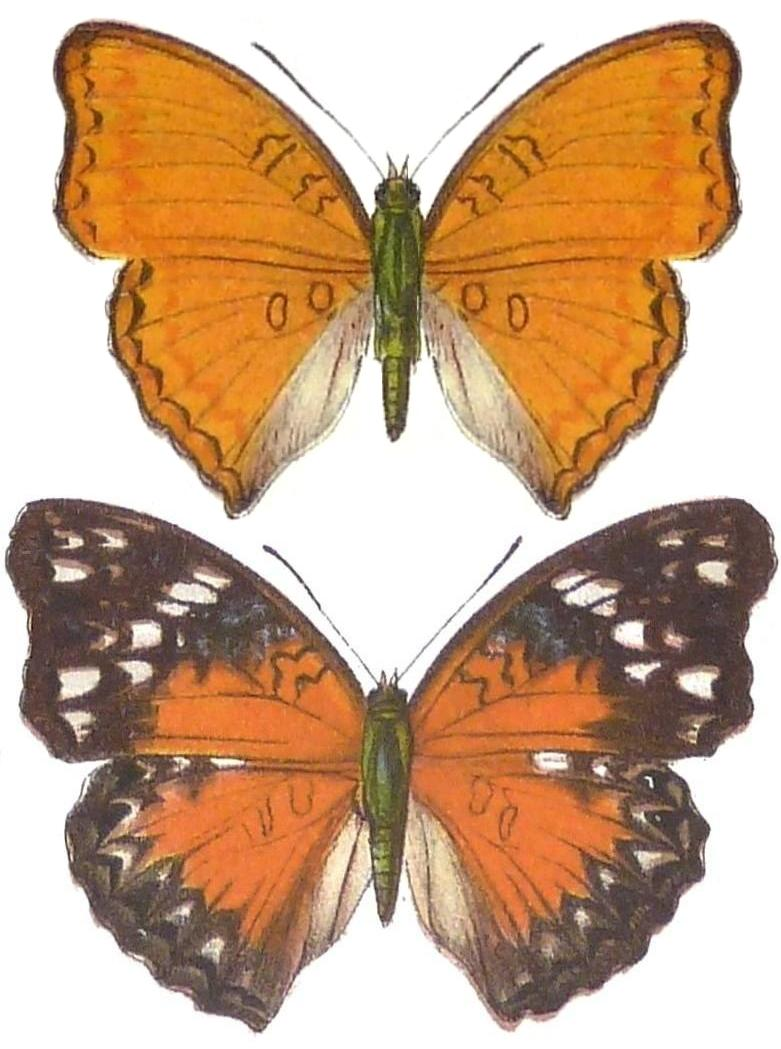
- Male and female in Seitz's Fauna Africana

Scientific classification
- Kingdom: Animalia
- Phylum: Arthropoda
- Class: Insecta
- Order: Lepidoptera
- Family: Nymphalidae
- Genus: Cymothoe
- Species: C. preussi

Binomial name
- Cymothoe preussi Staudinger, 1890

= Cymothoe preussi =

Species of butterfly

Cymothoe preussi, or Preuss' orange glider, is a butterfly in the family Nymphalidae. It can be found in eastern Nigeria and western Cameroon. The habitat consists of forests.

Adult females mimic moths of genus Aletis.
