= Cymothoe amaniensis =

Scientific classification
- Kingdom: Animalia
- Phylum: Arthropoda
- Class: Insecta
- Order: Lepidoptera
- Family: Nymphalidae
- Genus: Cymothoe
- Species: C. amaniensis

Binomial name
- Cymothoe amaniensis Rydon, 1980

Species of butterfly

Cymothoe amaniensis is a butterfly in the family Nymphalidae. It is found in north-eastern Tanzania. The habitat consists of sub-montane forest at altitudes between 900 and 1,200 meters.

The larvae probably feed on Rawsonia usambarensis.
