= Cymothoe hesiodina =

Scientific classification
- Kingdom: Animalia
- Phylum: Arthropoda
- Class: Insecta
- Order: Lepidoptera
- Family: Nymphalidae
- Genus: Cymothoe
- Species: C. hesiodina

Binomial name
- Cymothoe hesiodina Schultze, 1908

Species of butterfly

Cymothoe hesiodina, or Schultze's lurid glider, is a butterfly in the family Nymphalidae. It is found in Nigeria (the Cross River loop) and Cameroon. The habitat consists of forests.
