= Cymothoe zombana =

Scientific classification
- Kingdom: Animalia
- Phylum: Arthropoda
- Class: Insecta
- Order: Lepidoptera
- Family: Nymphalidae
- Genus: Cymothoe
- Species: C. zombana

Binomial name
- Cymothoe zombana Bethune-Baker, 1926

Species of butterfly

Cymothoe zombana is a butterfly in the family Nymphalidae. It is found on the Zomba and Nyika plateaus in Malawi.
