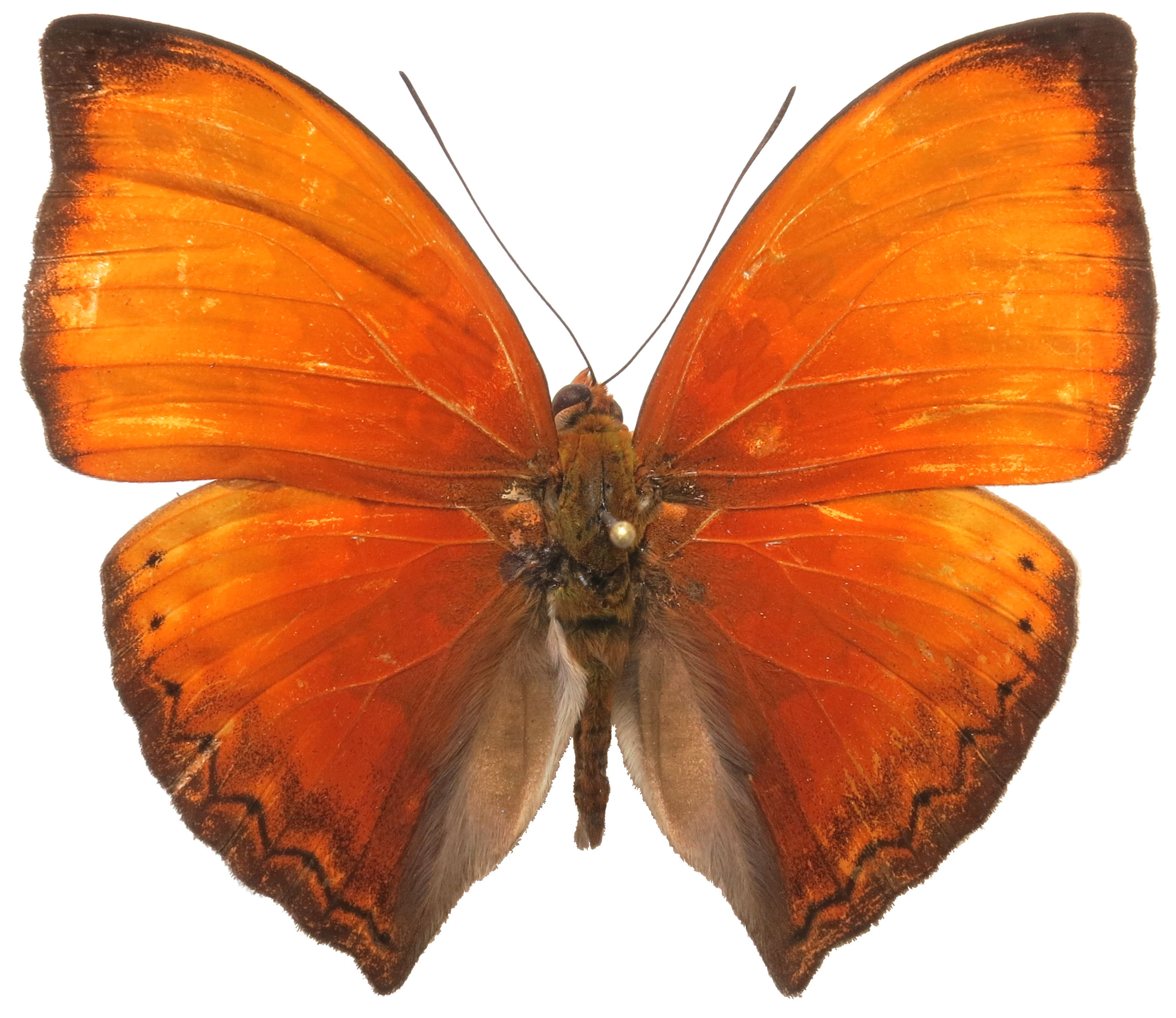
- male dorsal side - Maka, Ouham-Pendé
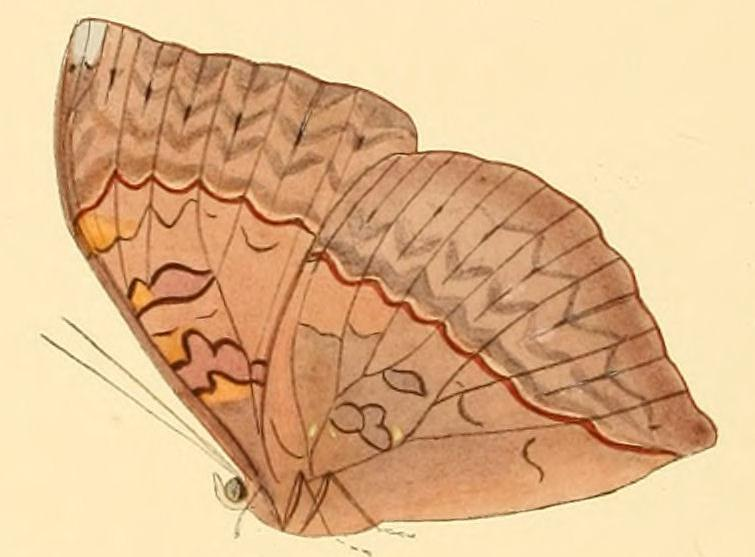

Scientific classification
- Kingdom: Animalia
- Phylum: Arthropoda
- Class: Insecta
- Order: Lepidoptera
- Family: Nymphalidae
- Genus: Cymothoe
- Species: C. hesiodotus

Binomial name
- Cymothoe hesiodotus Staudinger, 1890

Synonyms
- Cymothoe lurida var. nigeriensis Overlaet, 1952

= Cymothoe hesiodotus =

Species of butterfly

Cymothoe hesiodotus, the orange lurid glider, is a butterfly in the family Nymphalidae. It is found in Nigeria, Cameroon, Gabon, the Republic of the Congo, the Central African Republic and the Democratic Republic of the Congo. The habitat consists of forests.

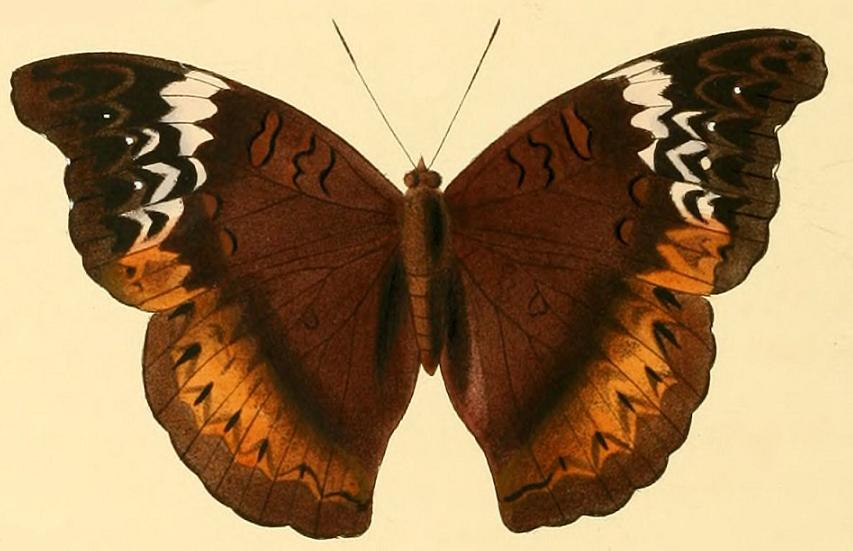

The larvae feed on Rinorea species.

== Subspecies ==
- Cymothoe hesiodotus hesiodotus (eastern Cameroon, Gabon, Congo, Central African Republic, south-central Democratic Republic of the Congo)
- Cymothoe hesiodotus clarior Overlaet, 1952 (Democratic Republic of the Congo: east and from the Ituri Forest to Kindu)
- Cymothoe hesiodotus nigeriensis Overlaet, 1952 (mid-western Nigeria)
