= Cymothoe alticola =

Scientific classification
- Kingdom: Animalia
- Phylum: Arthropoda
- Class: Insecta
- Order: Lepidoptera
- Family: Nymphalidae
- Genus: Cymothoe
- Species: C. alticola

Binomial name
- Cymothoe alticola Libert & Collins, 1997

Species of butterfly

Cymothoe alticola, the mountain glider, is a butterfly in the family Nymphalidae. It is found in Cameroon. The habitat consists of montane forests at altitudes above 1,100 meters.

The larvae feed on Caloncoba species.
