= Cymothoe collarti =

Scientific classification
- Kingdom: Animalia
- Phylum: Arthropoda
- Clade: Pancrustacea
- Class: Insecta
- Order: Lepidoptera
- Family: Nymphalidae
- Genus: Cymothoe
- Species: C. collarti

Binomial name
- Cymothoe collarti Overlaet, 1942

Species of butterfly

Cymothoe collarti is a butterfly in the family Nymphalidae. It is found in the Democratic Republic of the Congo and Rwanda.

== Subspecies ==
- Cymothoe collarti collarti (Democratic Republic of the Congo: Ituri)
- Cymothoe collarti werneri Beaurain, 1984 (Rwanda)
