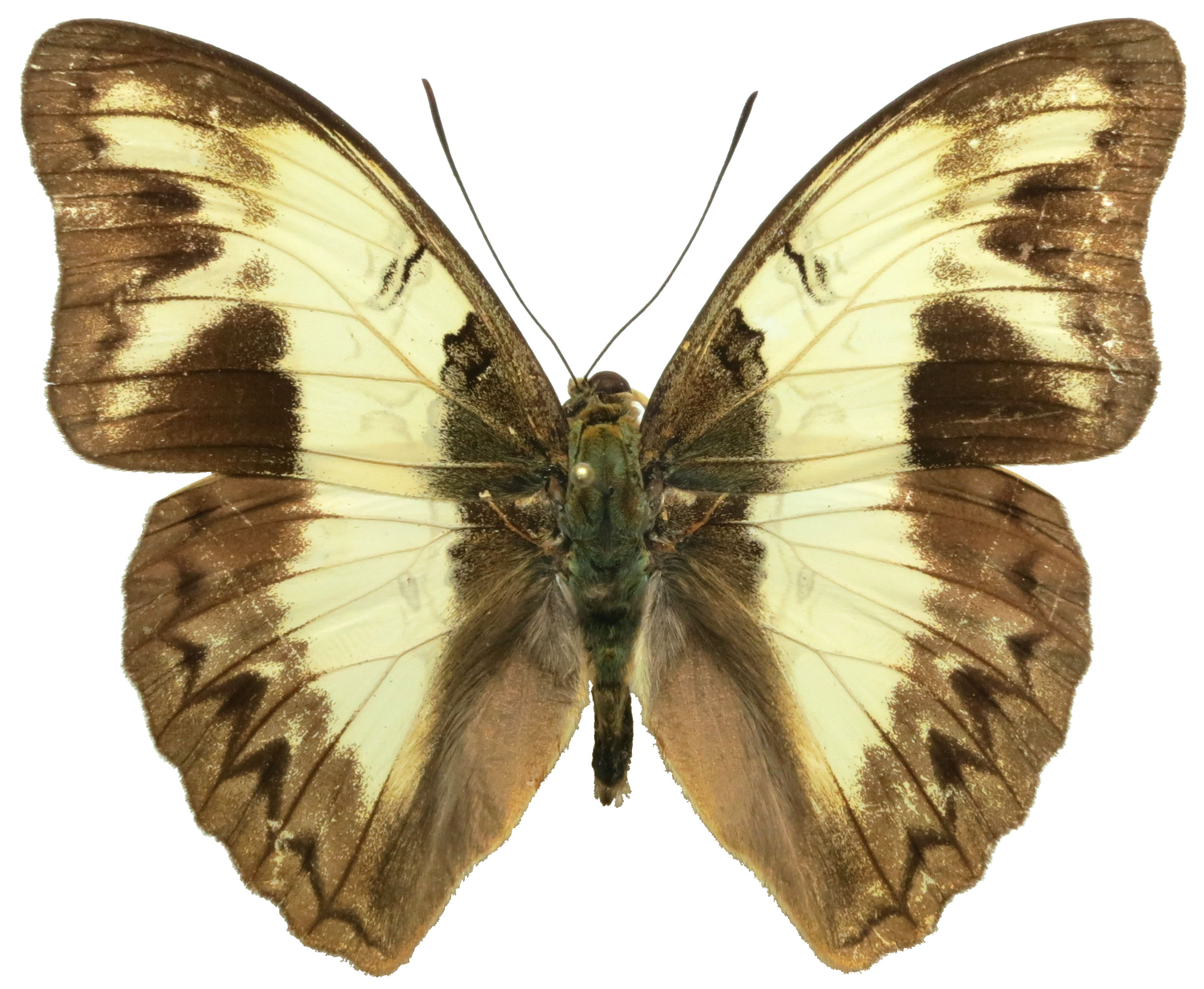
- male - CAR
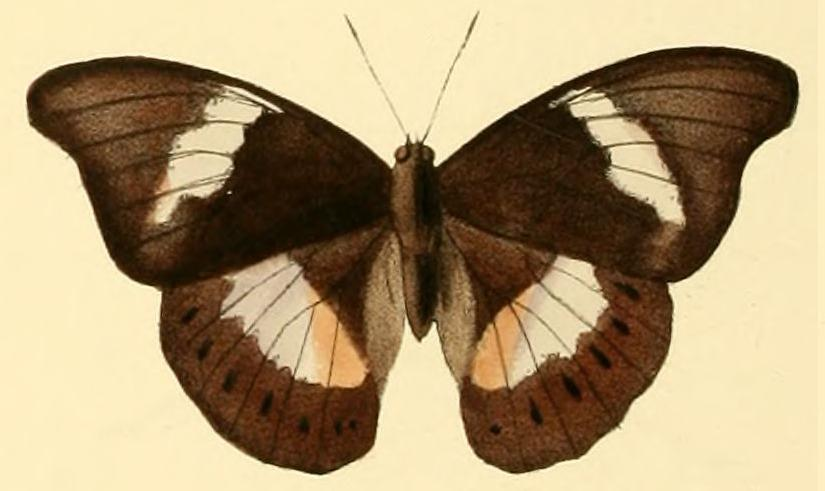
- female

Scientific classification
- Kingdom: Animalia
- Phylum: Arthropoda
- Class: Insecta
- Order: Lepidoptera
- Family: Nymphalidae
- Genus: Cymothoe
- Species: C. indamora

Binomial name
- Cymothoe indamora (Hewitson, 1866)

Synonyms
- Harma indamora Hewitson, 1866; Cymothoe hewitsoni Staudinger, 1890; Cymothoe staudingeri Aurivillius, 1899; Cymothoe indamora amorinda f. damora van Someren, 1939; Cymothoe indamora canui f. annamariae Beaurain, 1985; Cymothoe indamora canui f. nathaliae Beaurain, 1985

= Cymothoe indamora =

Indamora glider

Species of butterfly

Cymothoe indamora, the Indamora glider, is a butterfly in the family Nymphalidae. It is found in Nigeria, Cameroon, Equatorial Guinea, the Republic of the Congo, the Central African Republic, the Democratic Republic of the Congo and Uganda. The habitat consists of the transition zone between primary and secondary forests.

Adults are attracted to fallen fruit.

The larvae feed on Flacourtiaceae species.

== Subspecies ==
- Cymothoe indamora indamora (Nigeria: Cross River loop, Cameroon, Congo, Central African Republic, Democratic Republic of the Congo)
- Cymothoe indamora amorinda van Someren, 1939 (Uganda: west to the Kalinzu Forest)
- Cymothoe indamora canui Beaurain, 1985 (Bioko)
