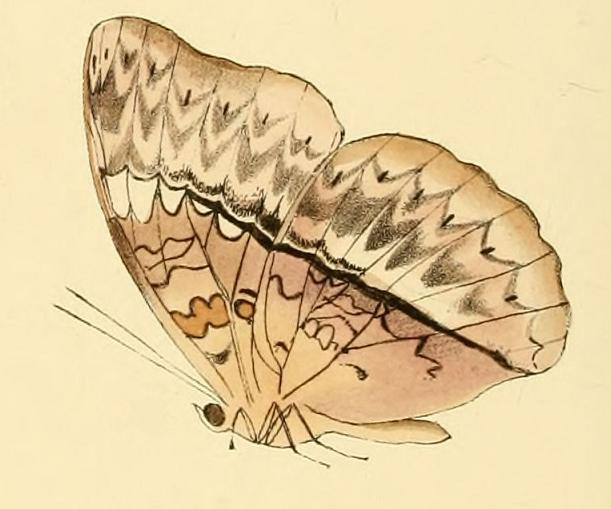

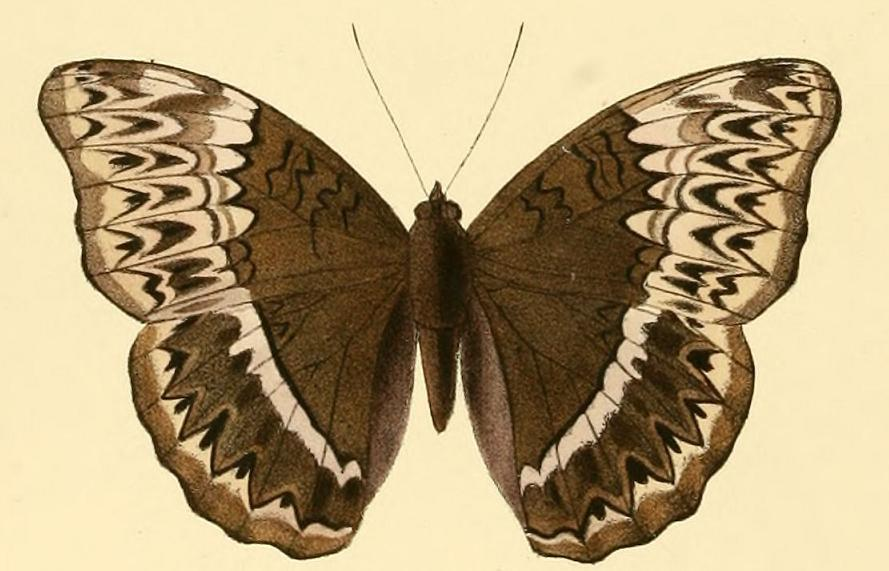

Scientific classification
- Kingdom: Animalia
- Phylum: Arthropoda
- Class: Insecta
- Order: Lepidoptera
- Family: Nymphalidae
- Genus: Cymothoe
- Species: C. harmilla

Binomial name
- Cymothoe harmilla (Hewitson, 1874)

Synonyms
- Harma harmilla Hewitson, 1874; Cymothoe serpentina Kirby, 1889; Cymothoe ogowa ab. major Neustetter, 1912; Cymothoe ogova f. rubescens Holland, 1920; Cymothoe herminia f. dunkeli Audeoud, 1936; Cymothoe ogova f. straelini Overlaet, 1945; Cymothoe kraepelini Schultze, 1912

= Cymothoe harmilla =

Species of butterfly

Cymothoe harmilla is a butterfly in the family Nymphalidae. It is found in Cameroon, Gabon and the Democratic Republic of the Congo.

Adults of Cymothoe butterflies, including related species in forest assemblages, are commonly associated with dense forest habitats. They are often recorded as part of lowland fruit‑feeding butterfly communities.

== Subspecies ==
- Cymothoe harmilla harmilla (Nigeria, south-western Cameroon, Gabon)
- Cymothoe harmilla kraepelini Schultze, 1912 (south-eastern Cameroon)
- Cymothoe harmilla micans Bouyer & Joly, 1995 (eastern Democratic Republic of the Congo)
