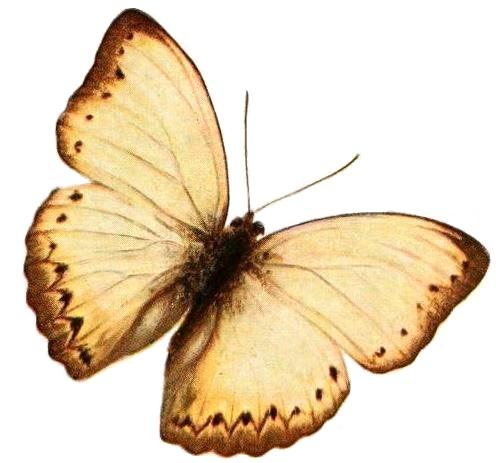

Scientific classification
- Kingdom: Animalia
- Phylum: Arthropoda
- Class: Insecta
- Order: Lepidoptera
- Family: Nymphalidae
- Genus: Cymothoe
- Species: C. angulifascia

Binomial name
- Cymothoe angulifascia Aurivillius, 1897

Synonyms
- Cymothoe kassaiensis Schmidt, 1921

= Cymothoe angulifascia =

Species of butterfly

Cymothoe angulifascia is a butterfly in the family Nymphalidae. It is found in the Democratic Republic of the Congo (Uele, Tshopo, Maniema, Mai-Ndombe, Kwilu, Kasai, Sankuru and Lualaba).
