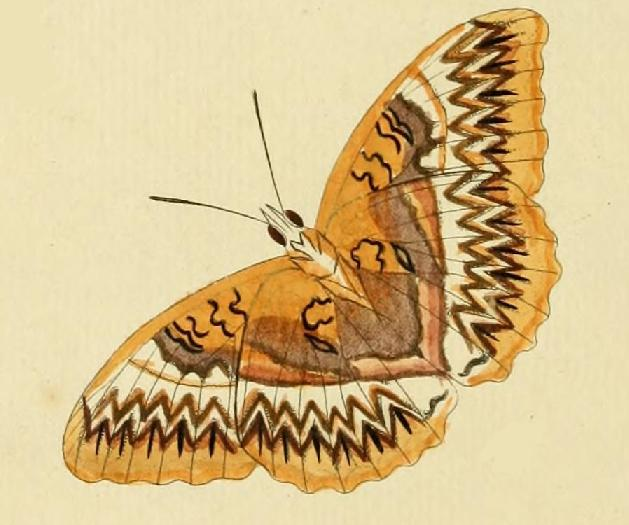

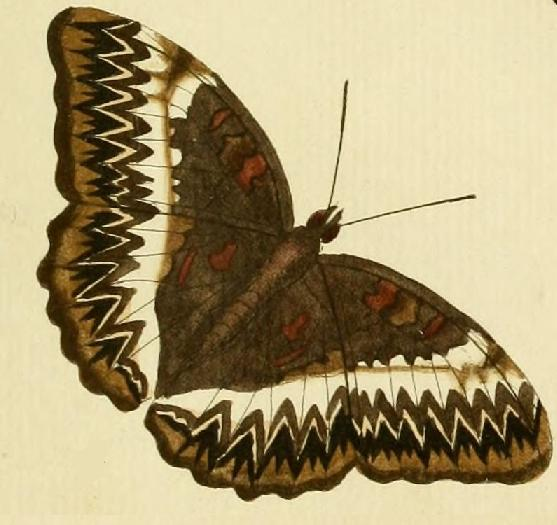

Scientific classification
- Kingdom: Animalia
- Phylum: Arthropoda
- Clade: Pancrustacea
- Class: Insecta
- Order: Lepidoptera
- Family: Nymphalidae
- Genus: Cymothoe
- Species: C. althea

Binomial name
- Cymothoe althea (Cramer, 1776)

Synonyms
- Papilio althea Cramer, 1776; Papilio amphicede Cramer, 1777

= Cymothoe althea =

Western glider

Species of butterfly

Cymothoe althea, the western glider, is a butterfly in the family Nymphalidae. It is found in Guinea, Sierra Leone, Liberia, Ivory Coast, Ghana and Nigeria. The habitat consists of wetter forests.

== Subspecies ==
- Cymothoe althea althea (Guinea, Sierra Leone, Liberia, Ivory Coast, Ghana)
- Cymothoe althea bobi Collins & Larsen, 2000 (eastern Nigeria)

Torben Larsen developed a species numbering system for his 2005 publication Butterflies of West Africa. The nominate subspecies is #866. The 'Larsen' numbers have since been used with permission in A Sharp Eye on Butterflies of Ghana.
