= Cymothoe magnus =

Scientific classification
- Kingdom: Animalia
- Phylum: Arthropoda
- Class: Insecta
- Order: Lepidoptera
- Family: Nymphalidae
- Genus: Cymothoe
- Species: C. magnus

Binomial name
- Cymothoe magnus Joicey & Talbot, 1928

Species of butterfly

Cymothoe magnus is a butterfly in the family Nymphalidae. It is found in the north-eastern part of the Democratic Republic of the Congo.
