= Cymothoe ochreata =

Scientific classification
- Kingdom: Animalia
- Phylum: Arthropoda
- Class: Insecta
- Order: Lepidoptera
- Family: Nymphalidae
- Genus: Cymothoe
- Species: C. ochreata

Binomial name
- Cymothoe ochreata Grose-Smith, 1890

Synonyms
- Cymothoe cycladina Grünberg, 1908; Cymothoe vicina Hulstaert, 1926; Cymothoe ochreata f. hulstaerti Overlaet, 1952; Cymothoe ochreata f. normalis Overlaet, 1952

Species of butterfly

Cymothoe ochreata is a butterfly in the family Nymphalidae. It is found in the eastern part of the Democratic Republic of the Congo and western Uganda.
