= Cymothoe radialis =

Scientific classification
- Kingdom: Animalia
- Phylum: Arthropoda
- Class: Insecta
- Order: Lepidoptera
- Family: Nymphalidae
- Genus: Cymothoe
- Species: C. radialis

Binomial name
- Cymothoe radialis Gaede, 1916

Species of butterfly

Cymothoe radialis is a butterfly in the family Nymphalidae. It is found in Cameroon.

This species has a wingspan of 50 mm. The holotype was provided by the collector Von Stetten from the Moloundou district in southern Cameroon.
