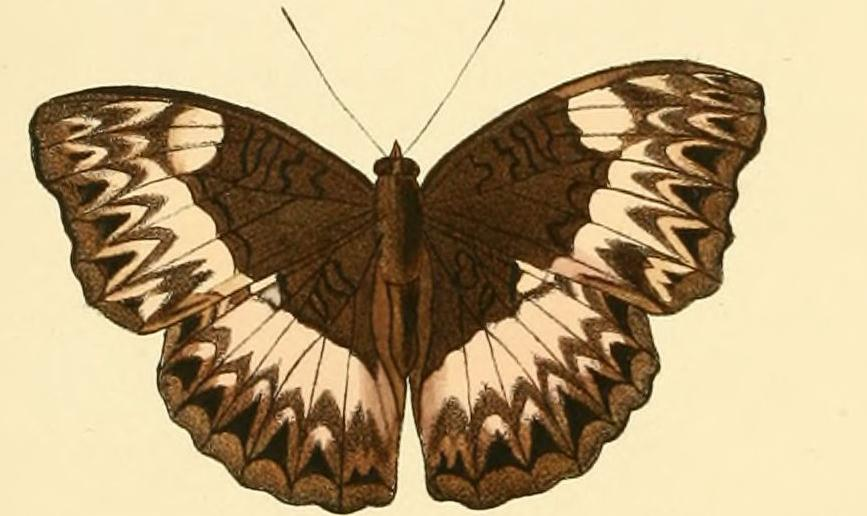

Scientific classification
- Kingdom: Animalia
- Phylum: Arthropoda
- Class: Insecta
- Order: Lepidoptera
- Family: Nymphalidae
- Genus: Cymothoe
- Species: C. anitorgis

Binomial name
- Cymothoe anitorgis (Hewitson, 1874)

Synonyms
- Harma anitorgis Hewitson, 1874; Cymothoe aramis Hewitson, 1874; Cymothoe aralus Mabille, 1890; Cymothoe anitorgis ab. misa Strand, 1910; Cymothoe aramis ab. albofasciata Neustetter, 1912; Cymothoe anitorgis f. menteaui Overlaet, 1944; Cymothoe anitorgis f. adaequata Overlaet, 1944

= Cymothoe anitorgis =

White-spot red glider

Species of butterfly

Cymothoe anitorgis, the white-spot red glider, is a butterfly in the family Nymphalidae. It is found in eastern Nigeria, Cameroon, Gabon, the Republic of the Congo and the Democratic Republic of the Congo (Moyen-Congo). The habitat consists of forests.
