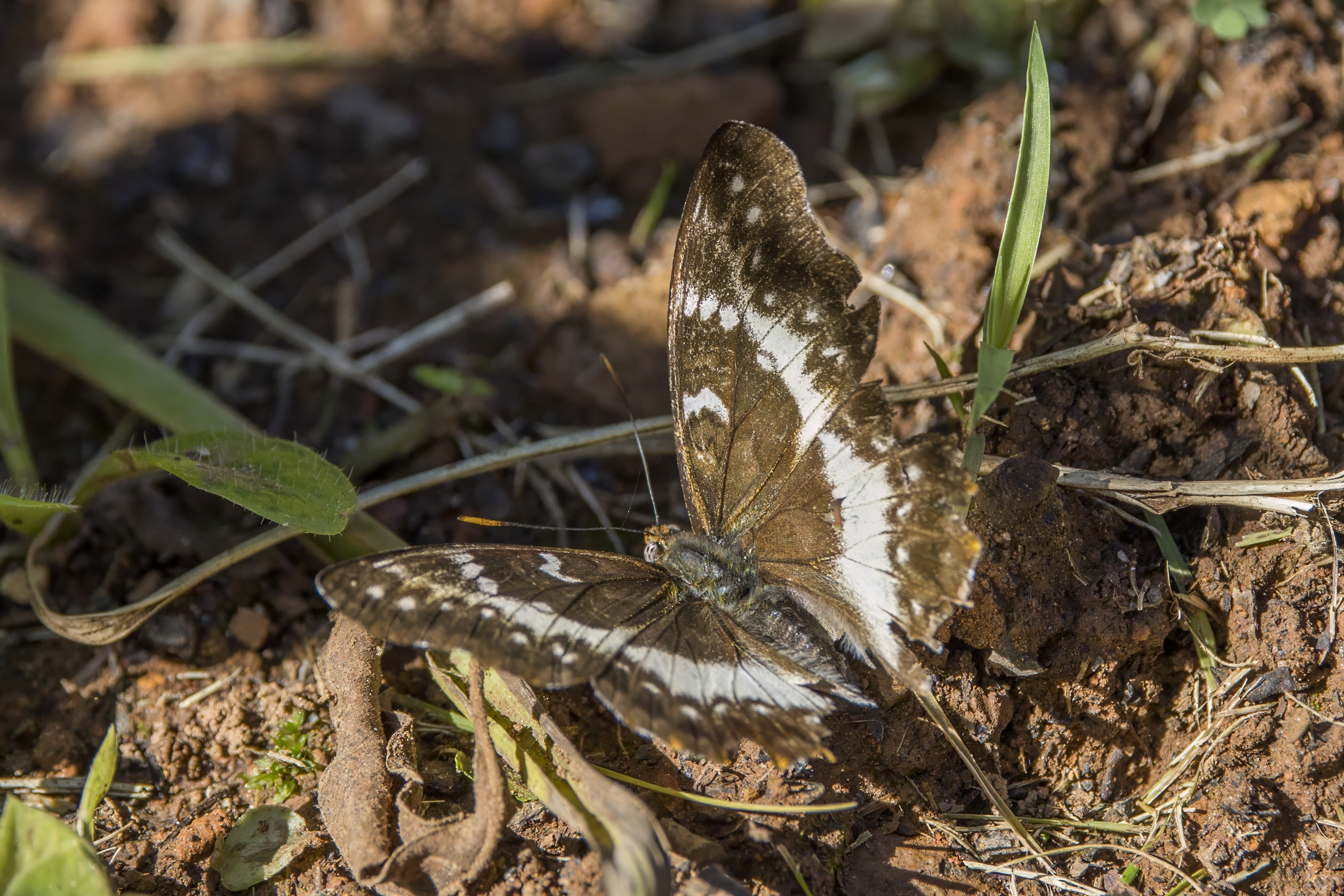
- female C. a. marieps Mbombela, Mpumalanga, South Africa

Scientific classification
- Kingdom: Animalia
- Phylum: Arthropoda
- Class: Insecta
- Order: Lepidoptera
- Family: Nymphalidae
- Genus: Cymothoe
- Species: C. alcimeda

Binomial name
- Cymothoe alcimeda (Godart, [1824])

Synonyms
- Nymphalis alcimeda Godart, [1824]; Pallene eupithes Doubleday, [1848]; Cymothoe alcimeda r. clarki Stevenson, 1940; Cymothoe alcimeda marieps f. penningtoni Rydon, 1994; Cymothoe alcimeda race rhodesiae Stevenson, 1934; Cymothoe alcimeda transvaalica f. aurantifascia Rydon, 1994; Cymothoe alcimeda trimeni f. ochrotaenia Rydon, 1980 in d'Abrera, 1980; Cymothoe alcimeda trimeni f. griseoligata Rydon, 1991

= Cymothoe alcimeda =

Battling glider

Species of butterfly

Cymothoe alcimeda, the battling glider, is a butterfly of the family Nymphalidae. It is found in South Africa and Zimbabwe.

The wingspan is 40–50 mm for males and 45–55 mm for females. Adults are on wing year round, but mainly in summer from October onwards. Peaks occur in November and from February to April.

The larvae feed on Kiggelaria africana.

== Subspecies ==
- Cymothoe alcimeda alcimeda (Western Cape to Knysna)
- Cymothoe alcimeda trimeni Aurivillius, 1912 (Eastern Cape along Drakensberg escarpment to KwaZulu-Natal midlands)
- Cymothoe alcimeda clarki Stevenson, 1940 (Amatola range of Eastern Cape)
- Cymothoe alcimeda rhodesiae Stevenson, 1934 (eastern Zimbabwe (Vumba Mountains))
- Cymothoe alcimeda marieps Rydon, 1994 (south of Olifants River from Mariepskop to Barberton in Mpumalanga)
- Cymothoe alcimeda transvaalica Rydon, 1994 (Limpopo Province escarpment)
