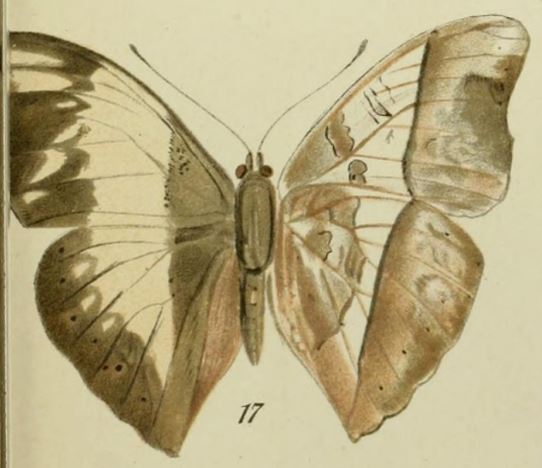

Conservation status
- Least Concern (IUCN 3.1)

Scientific classification
- Kingdom: Animalia
- Phylum: Arthropoda
- Class: Insecta
- Order: Lepidoptera
- Family: Nymphalidae
- Genus: Cymothoe
- Species: C. zenkeri

Binomial name
- Cymothoe zenkeri Richelmann, 1913

Synonyms
- Cymothoe stetteni Bryk, 1915; Cymothoe langi Holland, 1920; Cymothoe langi f. mariae Dufrane, 1945

= Cymothoe zenkeri =

Zenker's glider

Species of butterfly

Cymothoe zenkeri, or Zenker's glider, is a butterfly in the family Nymphalidae.

== Distribution ==
It is found in Nigeria, Cameroon, the Central African Republic and the Democratic Republic of the Congo. The habitat consists of forests.

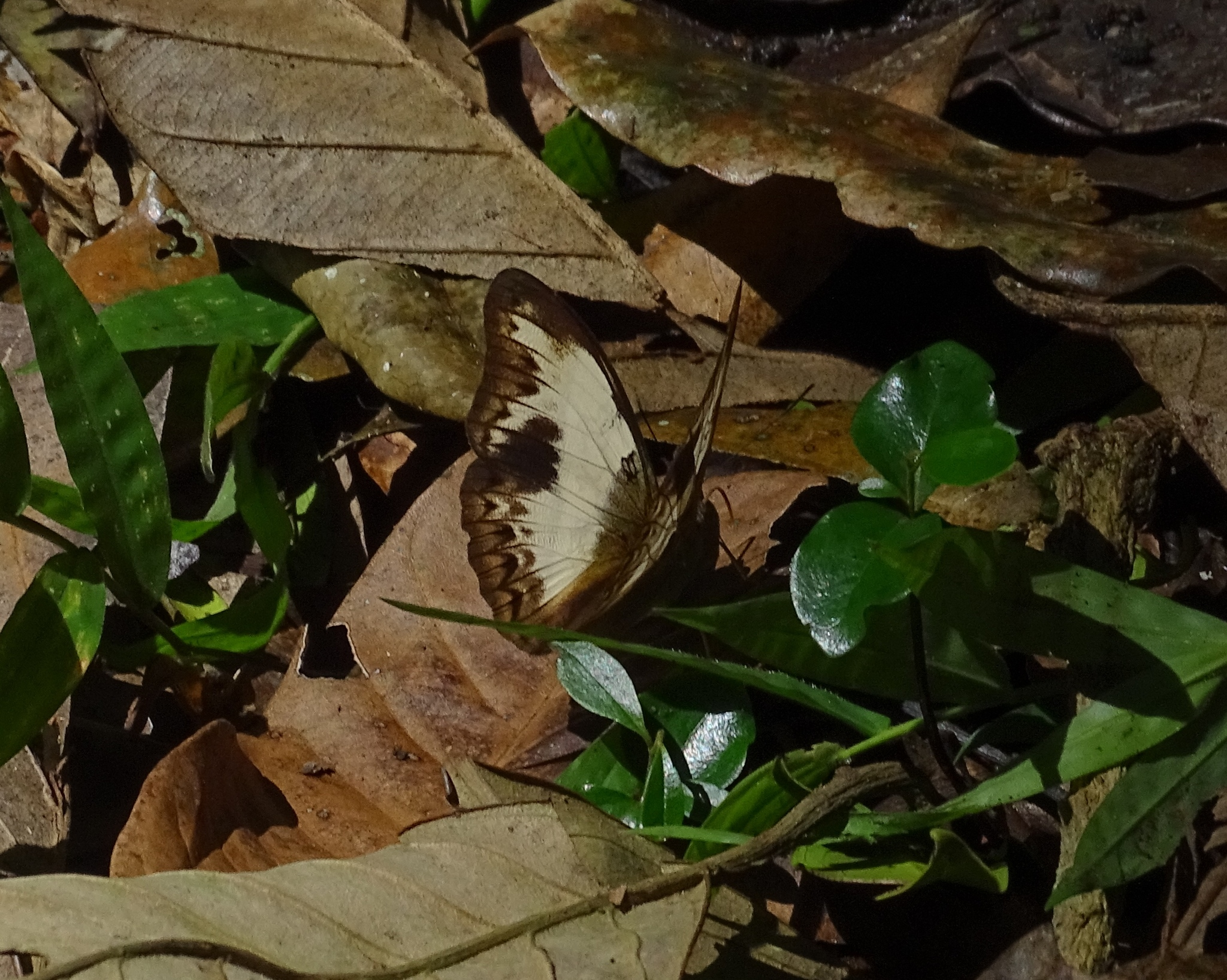
Zenker’s Glider (Cymothoe zenkeri) in Uganda, 2019.
