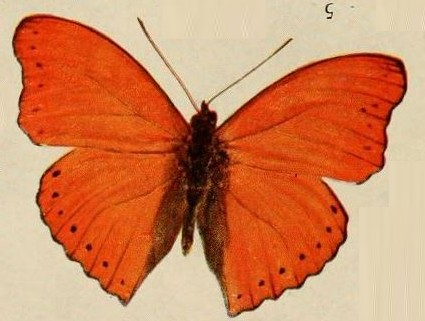

Scientific classification
- Kingdom: Animalia
- Phylum: Arthropoda
- Clade: Pancrustacea
- Class: Insecta
- Order: Lepidoptera
- Family: Nymphalidae
- Genus: Cymothoe
- Species: C. reginaeelisabethae

Binomial name
- Cymothoe reginaeelisabethae Holland, 1920

Synonyms
- Cymothoe dropsyi Overlaet, 1944; Cymothoe coccinata ab. similis Neustetter, 1912

= Cymothoe reginaeelisabethae =

Species of butterfly

Cymothoe reginaeelisabethae is a butterfly in the family Nymphalidae. It is found in Cameroon, the Democratic Republic of the Congo, Uganda and the Central African Republic.

== Subspecies ==
- Cymothoe reginaeelisabethae reginaeelisabethae (Uganda: Toro, Democratic Republic of the Congo: Uele, Ituri and northern Kivu)
- Cymothoe reginaeelisabethae belgarum Overlaet, 1952 (Central African Republic, Cameroon, Democratic Republic of the Congo: north to Ubangi)

== Etymology ==
"On the occasion of the visit to the Carnegie Institute by their Majesties, the King and the Queen of the Belgians, and of His Royal Highness, the Crown Prince Leopold, Duke of Brabant, on October 23, 1919, I had the honor of showing to Her Majesty, the Queen, a proof of Plate X of this paper, which was lying upon my desk. I requested Her Majesty to accord to me the privilege of naming this lovely butterfly in her honor, and 'she most graciously acceded to my request, expressing pleasure at the thought. It therefore bears the name of the Queen of the Belgians". —William Jacob Holland
