= Cymothoe arcuata =

Scientific classification
- Kingdom: Animalia
- Phylum: Arthropoda
- Class: Insecta
- Order: Lepidoptera
- Family: Nymphalidae
- Genus: Cymothoe
- Species: C. arcuata

Binomial name
- Cymothoe arcuata Overlaet, 1945

Synonyms
- Cymothoe arcuata f. rubronotata Overlaet, 1952

Species of butterfly

Cymothoe arcuata is a butterfly in the family Nymphalidae. It is found in the Republic of the Congo and the Democratic Republic of the Congo.
