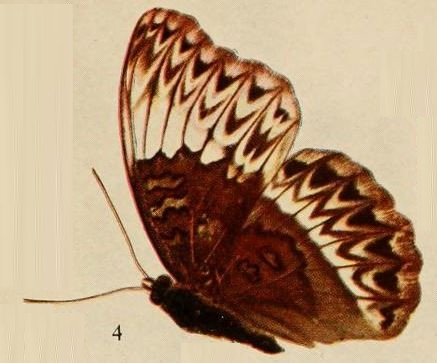

Scientific classification
- Domain: Eukaryota
- Kingdom: Animalia
- Phylum: Arthropoda
- Class: Insecta
- Order: Lepidoptera
- Family: Nymphalidae
- Genus: Cymothoe
- Species: C. ogova

Binomial name
- Cymothoe ogova (Plötz, 1880)

Synonyms
- Harma ogova Plötz, 1880

= Cymothoe ogova =

Elegant red glider

Species of butterfly

Cymothoe ogova, the elegant red glider, is a butterfly in the family Nymphalidae. It is found in southern Nigeria, Cameroon, Gabon and the Democratic Republic of the Congo. The habitat consists of forests.

Males are attracted to fallen fruit.

The larvae feed on Rinorea species.
