= Cymothoe isiro =

Scientific classification
- Kingdom: Animalia
- Phylum: Arthropoda
- Class: Insecta
- Order: Lepidoptera
- Family: Nymphalidae
- Genus: Cymothoe
- Species: C. isiro

Binomial name
- Cymothoe isiro Rydon, 1981

Synonyms
- Cymothoe isiro f. albidior Rydon, 1981

Species of butterfly

Cymothoe isiro is a butterfly in the family Nymphalidae. It is found in the Democratic Republic of the Congo (Uele).
