= Cymothoe melanjae =

Scientific classification
- Kingdom: Animalia
- Phylum: Arthropoda
- Class: Insecta
- Order: Lepidoptera
- Family: Nymphalidae
- Genus: Cymothoe
- Species: C. melanjae

Binomial name
- Cymothoe melanjae Bethune-Baker, 1926

Species of butterfly

Cymothoe melanjae is a butterfly in the family Nymphalidae. It is found on Mulanje Massif in Malawi.
