= Cymothoe fontainei =

Scientific classification
- Kingdom: Animalia
- Phylum: Arthropoda
- Class: Insecta
- Order: Lepidoptera
- Family: Nymphalidae
- Genus: Cymothoe
- Species: C. fontainei

Binomial name
- Cymothoe fontainei Overlaet, 1952

Species of butterfly

Cymothoe fontainei is a butterfly in the family Nymphalidae. It is found in Cameroon, the Republic of the Congo and the Democratic Republic of the Congo.

== Subspecies ==
- Cymothoe fontainei fontainei (Democratic Republic of the Congo)
- Cymothoe fontainei debauchei Overlaet, 1952 (Congo: Etoumbi, Cameroon: Nyong)
