= Cymothoe crocea =

Scientific classification
- Kingdom: Animalia
- Phylum: Arthropoda
- Class: Insecta
- Order: Lepidoptera
- Family: Nymphalidae
- Genus: Cymothoe
- Species: C. crocea

Binomial name
- Cymothoe crocea Schultze, 1917

Species of butterfly

Cymothoe crocea is a butterfly in the family Nymphalidae. It is found in Cameroon.
