= Common dart =

Common dart may refer to the following butterflies:

- Andronymus caesar, of tropical Africa, also called the white dart
- Andronymus neander, of tropical Africa, also called the nomad dart
- Ocybadistes flavovittata, of Indonesia, Australia and Papua New Guinea, also called the narrow-brand grass-dart
- Potanthus pseudomaesa, of India, also called the Indian dart or pseudomaesa dart
