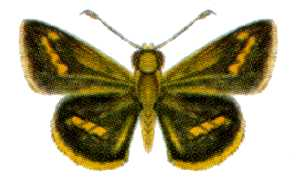

Scientific classification
- Kingdom: Animalia
- Phylum: Arthropoda
- Class: Insecta
- Order: Lepidoptera
- Family: Hesperiidae
- Genus: Suniana
- Species: S. lascivia

Binomial name
- Suniana lascivia (Rosenstock, 1885)

Synonyms
- Pamphila lascivia Rosenstock, 1885; Pamphila neocles Mabille, 1891; Suniana lasus Waterhouse, 1937; Suniana larrakia Couchman, 1951

= Suniana lascivia =

Species of butterfly

Suniana lascivia, the dingy grass-dart or dingy dart, is a butterfly of the family Hesperiidae. It is found in Australia (New South Wales, Northern Territory, Queensland, Victoria, Western Australia), Papua New Guinea and Indonesia.

The wingspan is about 20 mm.

The larvae feed on Panicum maximum and Imperata cylindrica species.
