= Oriens =

Oriens, the Latin word for "the East", may refer to:

- the Praetorian prefecture of Oriens or of the East
- the Diocese of Oriens, part of the prefecture
- Oriens Christianus, an academic journal
- Oriens (butterfly), a genus of butterflies in the family Hesperiidae
- The Morning Star
- Oriens (demon)
