= Buakea kaeuae =

Scientific classification
- Domain: Eukaryota
- Kingdom: Animalia
- Phylum: Arthropoda
- Class: Insecta
- Order: Lepidoptera
- Superfamily: Noctuoidea
- Family: Noctuidae
- Genus: Buakea
- Species: B. kaeuae

Binomial name
- Buakea kaeuae Moyal et al., 2011

Species of moth

Buakea kaeuae is a species of moth of the family Noctuidae. It is only known from two locations in Kenya.

The wingspan is 20–23 mm for males and 21–24 mm for females.

The larvae feed within the stem of Panicum maximum. Full-grown larvae reach a length of 30–35 mm.
