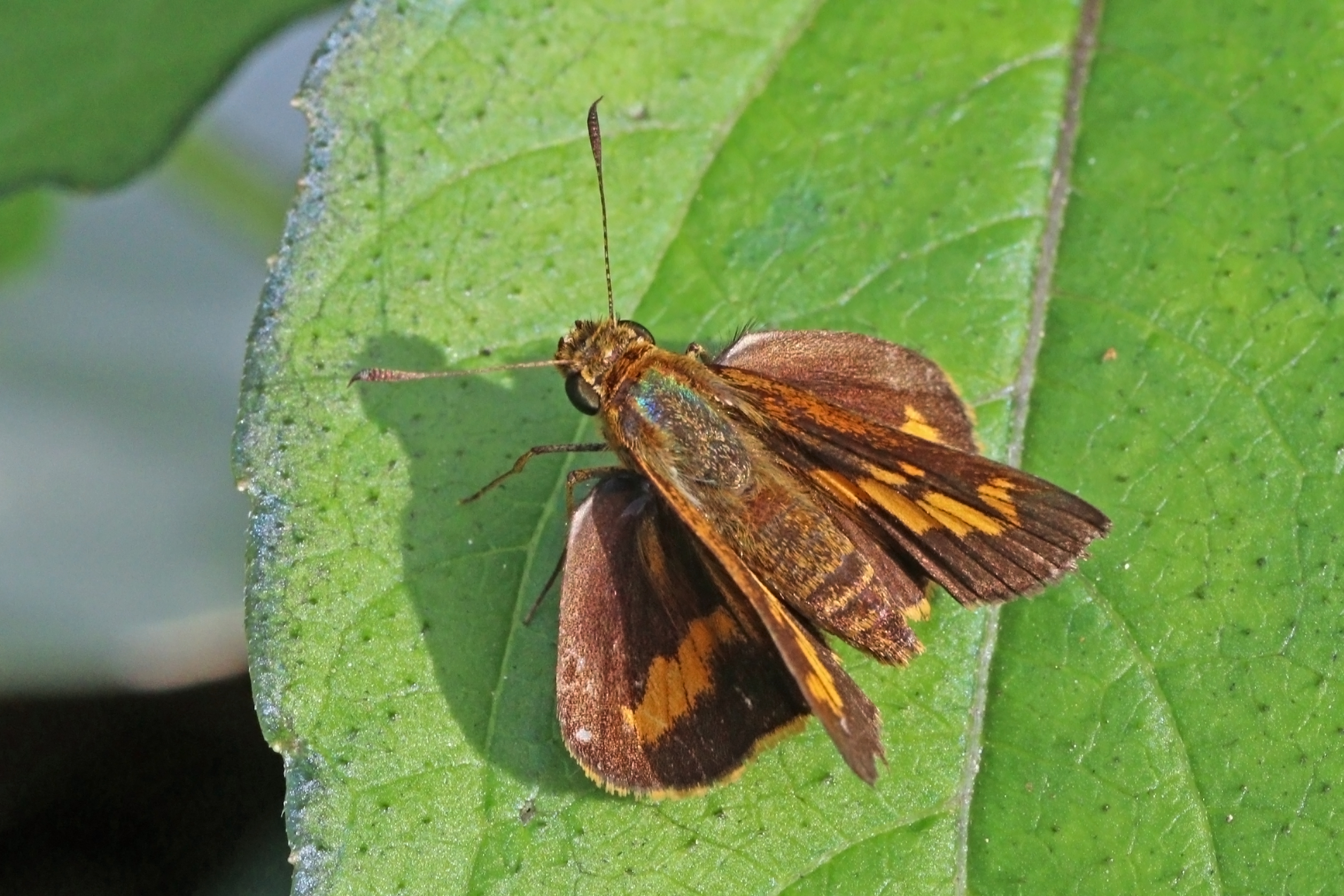
- Upperside
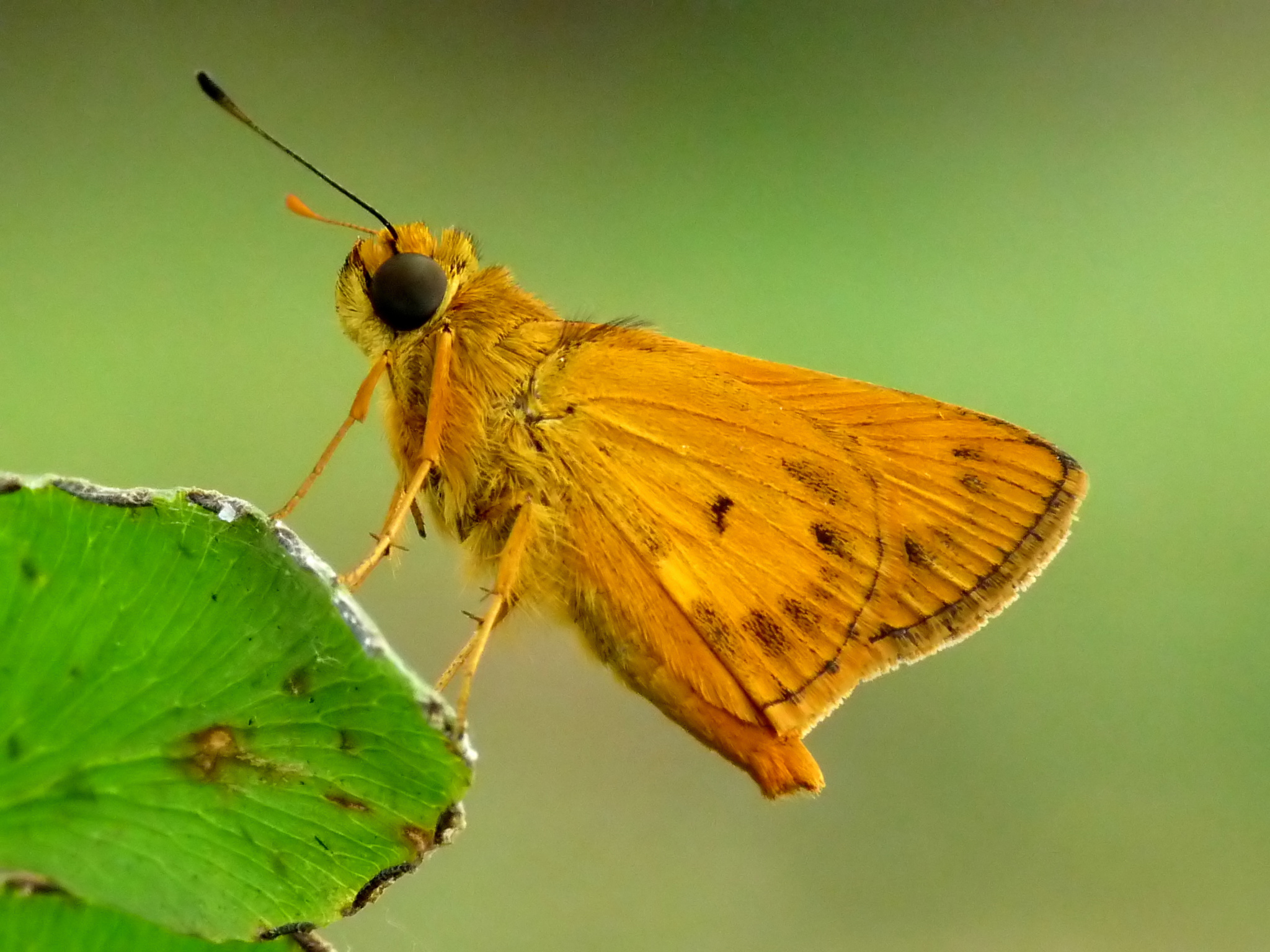
- Underside

Scientific classification
- Kingdom: Animalia
- Phylum: Arthropoda
- Class: Insecta
- Order: Lepidoptera
- Family: Hesperiidae
- Genus: Oriens
- Species: O. goloides

Binomial name
- Oriens goloides (Moore, 1881)

= Oriens goloides =

Common dartlet

Species of butterfly

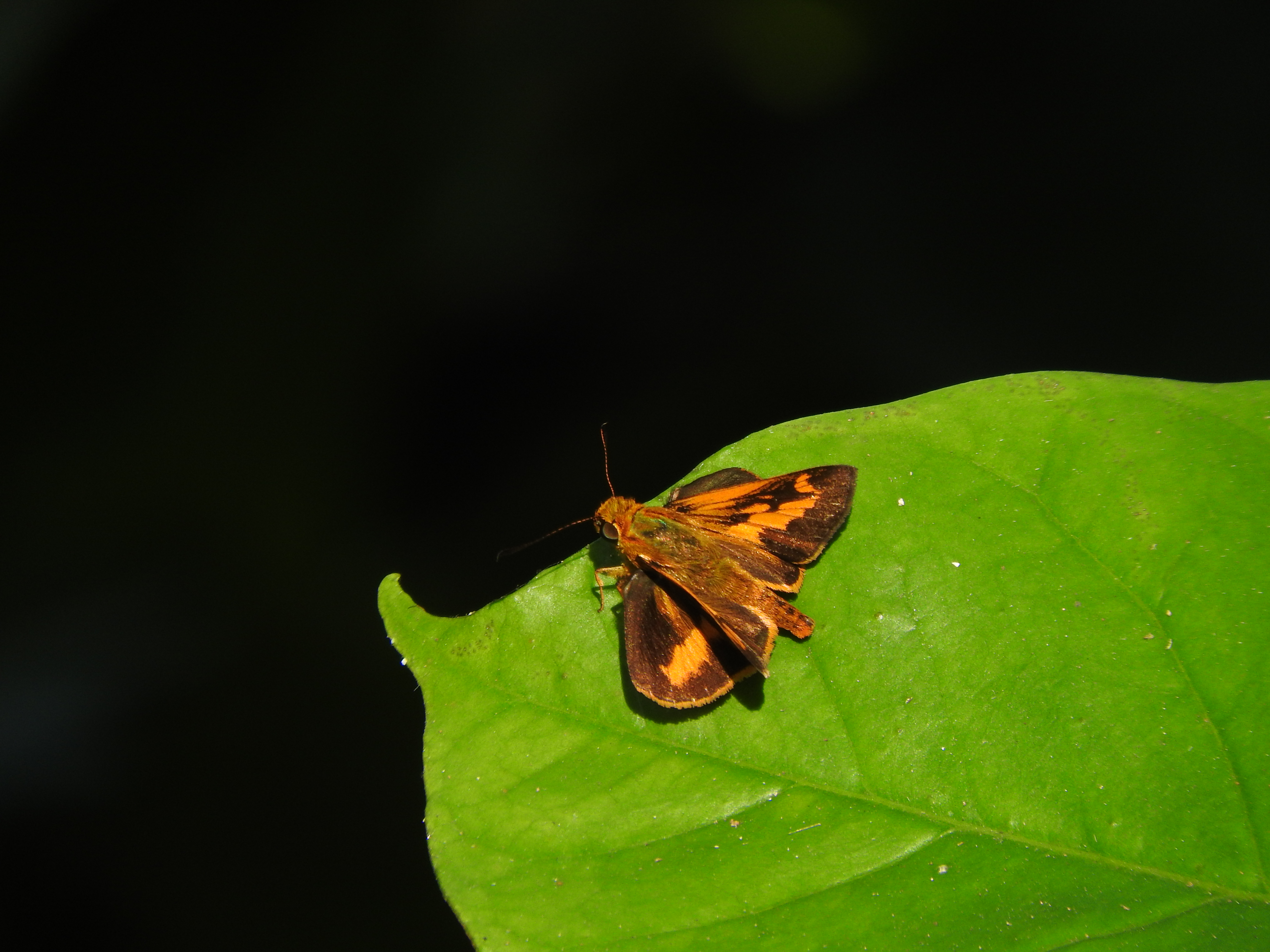
Seen in Nelliampathy, Kerala

Oriens goloides, the Ceylon dartlet or smaller dartlet, is a butterfly belonging to the family Hesperiidae found in India and Sri Lanka and Malay Peninsula.

== Description ==
Upperside dark purple-brown. Male: forewing with a golden yellow oblique discal sinuous band followed by small costal spots before the apex; base of the costa and cell, and two spots at its end also of the same colour; hindwing with a medial discal sinuous golden-yellow band, the hairy scales extending to the base also yellow. Cilia golden yellow. Underside with less distinct markings as above: costa and apex of forewing and the hindwing suffused with yellow. Body and legs golden-yellow; palpi and front of thorax beneath saffron-yellow. Female: differs only in the discal band being narrow; and not having the yellow costal streak.Edward Yerbury Watson

"Nearest allied species is Oriens gola. Differs from it on both sides in the narrower discal band of the forewing, the band being also disconnected from the costal spots; the band of the hindwing is also narrower." (Frederic Moore)

The larvae are known to feed on Axonopus compressus and Oplismenus compositus.
