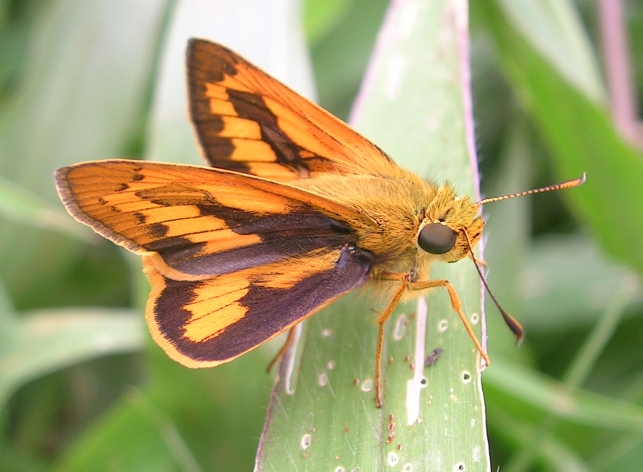
- Palm dart (Telicota ancilla)

Scientific classification
- Kingdom: Animalia
- Phylum: Arthropoda
- Class: Insecta
- Order: Lepidoptera
- Family: Hesperiidae
- Subfamily: Hesperiinae
- Tribe: Taractrocerini

= Taractrocerini =

Tribe of butterflies

The Taractrocerini, the orange grass skippers, are a tribe in the Hesperiinae subfamily of skipper butterflies.

== Genera ==
- Arrhenes Mabille, 1904
- Banta Evans, 1949
- Cephrenes Waterhouse & Lyell, 1914
- Kobrona Evans, 1935
- Mimene Joicey & Talbot, 1917
- Ocybadistes Heron, 1894
- Oriens Evans, 1932
- Pastria Evans, 1949
- Potanthus Scudder, 1872
- Sabera Swinhoe, 1908
- Suniana Evans, 1934
- Taractrocera Butler, 1870
- Telicota Moore, 1881
