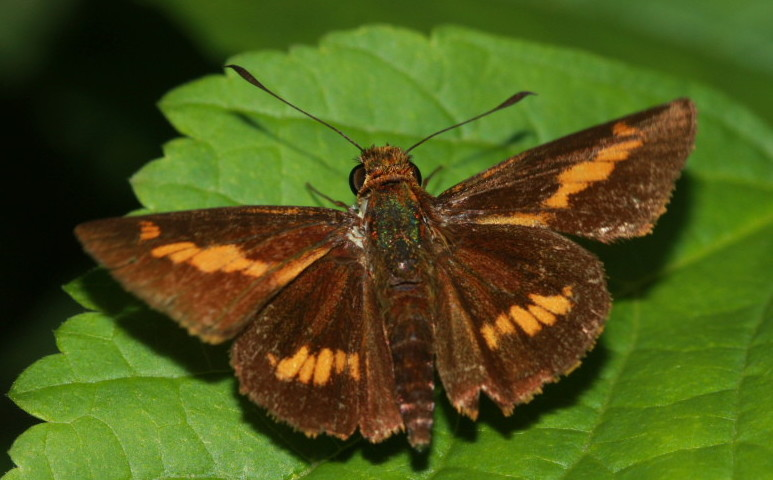
- dorsal view
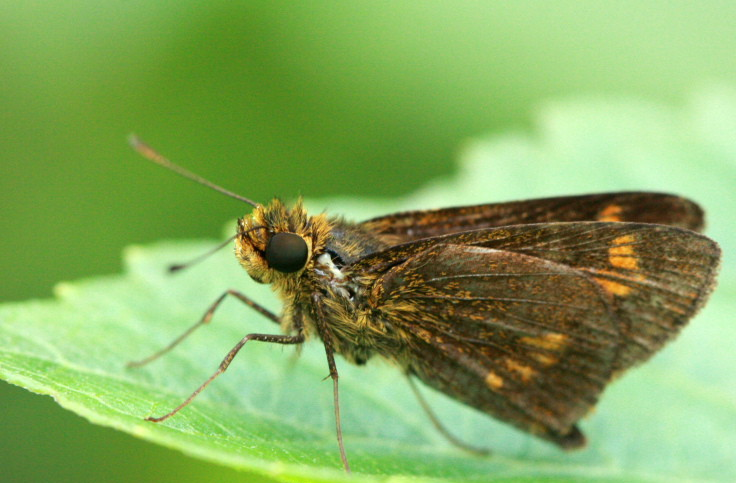
- ventral view

Scientific classification
- Kingdom: Animalia
- Phylum: Arthropoda
- Class: Insecta
- Order: Lepidoptera
- Family: Hesperiidae
- Genus: Oriens
- Species: O. concinna

Binomial name
- Oriens concinna (Elwes & Edwards, 1897)

= Oriens concinna =

Tamil dartlet

Species of butterfly

Oriens concinna, the Tamil dartlet, is a skipper butterfly belonging to the family Hesperiidae. It is a rare find in India and Australia. In India, it is found in Kerala, Tamil Nadu and Karnataka.

== Description ==
Male. Upperside very dark brown as in Oriens gola, with the dark orange-ochreous discal band and sub-apical spots much as in that species, but it is a distinctly larger species. Forewing comparatively broader, the spots at the end of the cell absent, though in one example the lower spot is present. Hindwing as in O. gola. Cilia as in gola, the yellow parts orange-ochreous, much darker than in gola. Underside with the ground colour similar, but the discal band of the hindwing is somewhat obscure and indistinct. Antennae, palpi, head and body similar. Female like the male.

— Charles Swinhoe, Lepidoptera Indica. Vol. X
