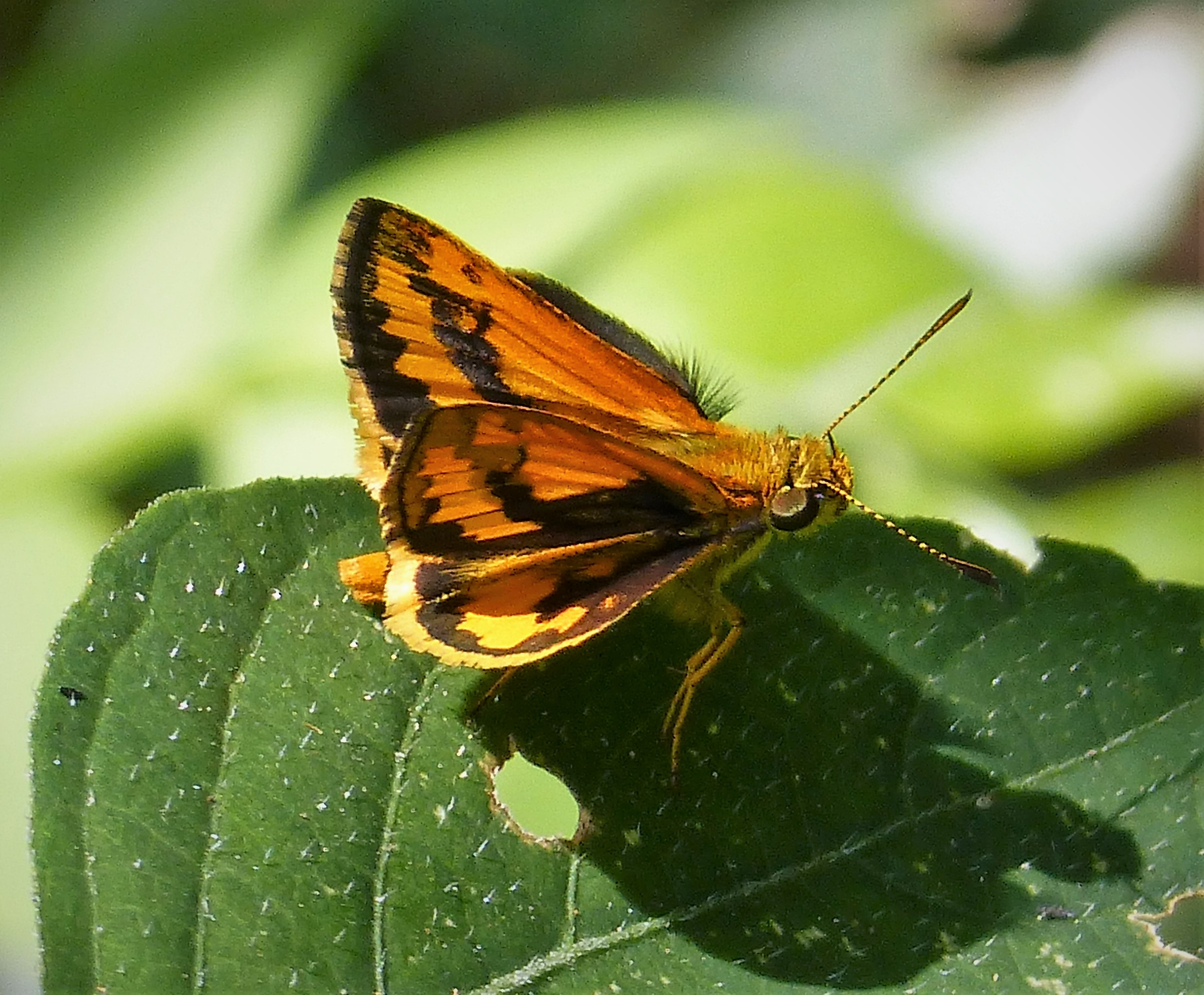

Scientific classification
- Kingdom: Animalia
- Phylum: Arthropoda
- Class: Insecta
- Order: Lepidoptera
- Family: Hesperiidae
- Genus: Arrhenes
- Species: A. dschilus

Binomial name
- Arrhenes dschilus (Plötz, 1885)

Synonyms
- Arrhenes colattus (Plötz, 1885); Arrhenes klossii (Rothschild, 1916); Padraona iris Waterhouse, 1932; Apaustus dschilus

= Arrhenes dschilus =

Species of butterfly

Arrhenes dschilus, the iris skipper or scrub darter, is a butterfly of the family Hesperiidae. It is found in New Guinea and Queensland.

The wingspan is about 30 mm.

The larvae feed on Imperata cylindrica, Panicum maximum and Saccharum officinarum.

== Subspecies ==
- Arrhenes dschilus dschilus
- Arrhenes dschilus decor
- Arrhenes dschilus iris (Queensland)
