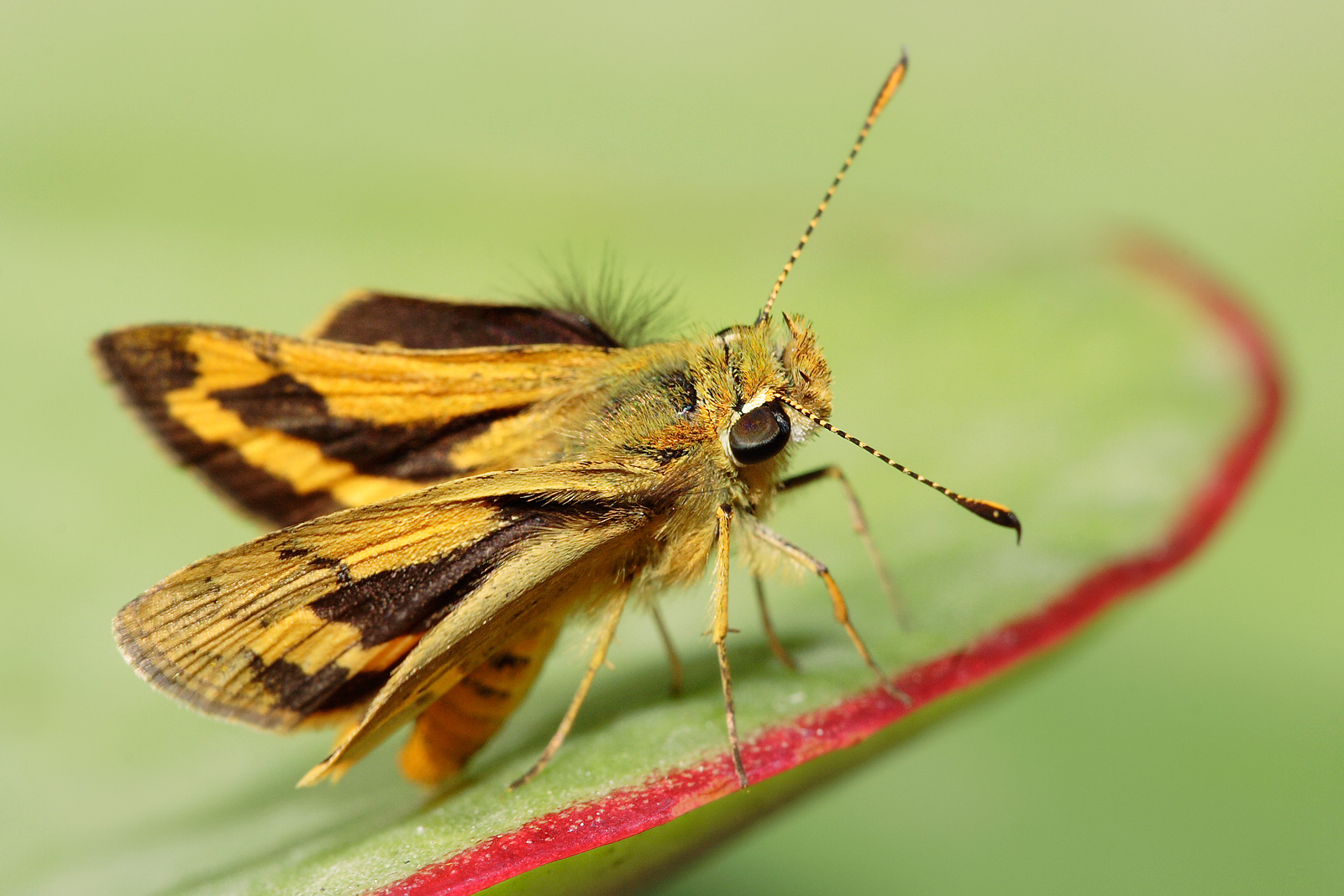
- Green grass-dart skipper butterfly

Scientific classification
- Domain: Eukaryota
- Kingdom: Animalia
- Phylum: Arthropoda
- Class: Insecta
- Order: Lepidoptera
- Family: Hesperiidae
- Genus: Ocybadistes
- Species: O. walkeri

Binomial name
- Ocybadistes walkeri Heron, 1894

= Ocybadistes walkeri =

Species of butterfly

Ocybadistes walkeri, the greenish grass-dart, green grass-dart, southern dart or yellow-banded dart, is a type of butterfly known as a skipper found in eastern and southern Australia, with one subspecies found in the Northern Territory.

The larvae feed on Dianella, Brachypodium distachyon, Cynodon dactylon, Erharta erecta, Panicum maximum, Pennisetum clandestinum and Thuarea involuta.

== Subspecies ==
- Ocybadistes walkeri hypochlora (South Australia)
- Ocybadistes walkeri olivia (Northern Territory, Western Australia)
- Ocybadistes walkeri sothis (Australian Capital Territory, New South Wales, Queensland, South Australia, Tasmania, Victoria)
