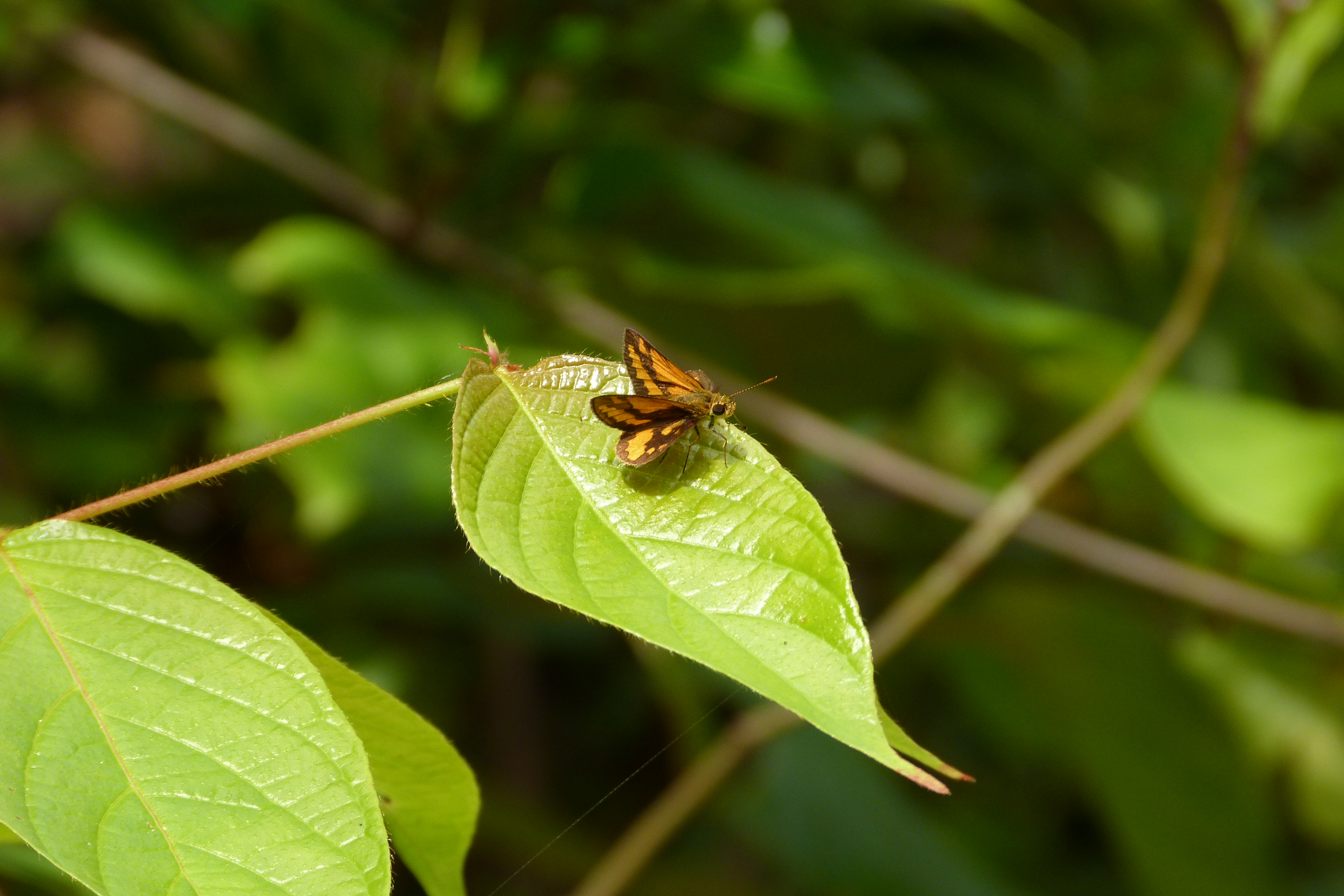
- Suniana sunias

Scientific classification
- Kingdom: Animalia
- Phylum: Arthropoda
- Class: Insecta
- Order: Lepidoptera
- Family: Hesperiidae
- Tribe: Taractrocerini
- Genus: Suniana; Evans, 1934

Species
- 3, see text

= Suniana =

Genus of butterflies

Suniana is a genus of butterflies in the family Hesperiidae, the skippers. It is composed of three species, all native to the Australian faunal region, Australia and several surrounding island nations.

Suniana is sister group to the genus Ocybadistes.

== Species ==
- Suniana lascivia (Rosenstock, 1885) – dingy grass-dart, northern dingy-dart
- Suniana subfasciata (Rothschild, 1915)
- Suniana sunias (Felder, 1860) – wide-brand grass-dart, orange dart
