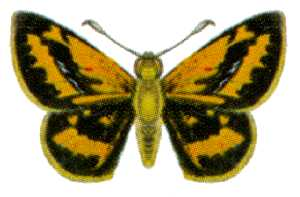

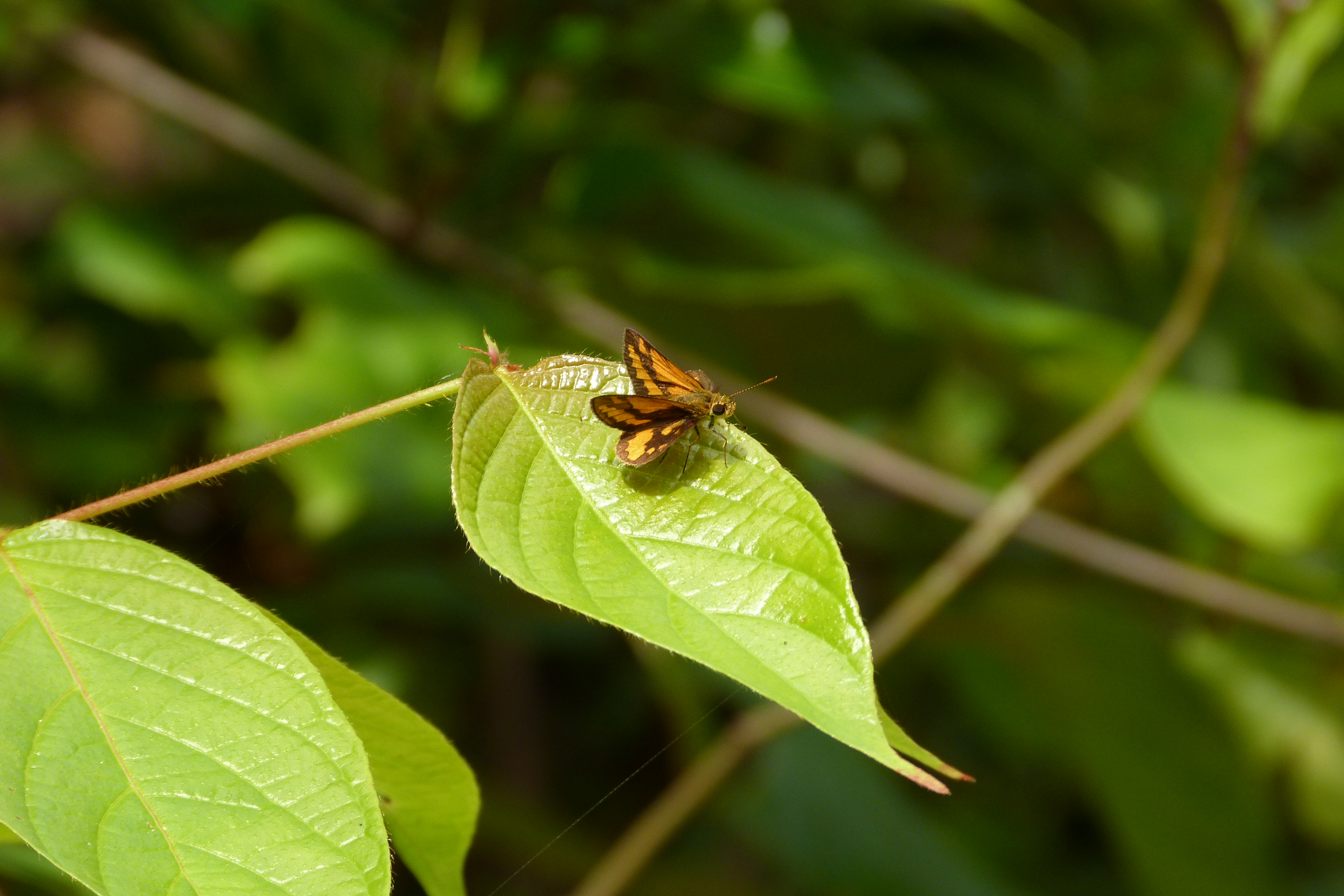

Scientific classification
- Kingdom: Animalia
- Phylum: Arthropoda
- Class: Insecta
- Order: Lepidoptera
- Family: Hesperiidae
- Genus: Suniana
- Species: S. sunias

Binomial name
- Suniana sunias (C. Felder, 1860)

Synonyms
- Pamphila sunias Felder, 1860; Pamphila rectivitta Mabille, 1878; Padraona nola Waterhouse, 1932; Padraona tanus nola Waterhouse, 1932; Suniana sauda Waterhouse, 1937; Padraona fasciata (Rothschild, 1916)

= Suniana sunias =

Species of butterfly

Suniana sunias is a butterfly of the family Hesperiidae. It is found in Indonesia (Papua, Maluku), Australia (New South Wales, Northern Territory and Queensland), Papua New Guinea and the Solomon Islands.

The wingspan is about 25 mm.

The larvae feed on Sorghum verticilliflorum, Paspalum urvillei, Panicum maximum, Leersia hexandra and other Leersia species. They rest in a shelter made from blades of their host plant joined with silk.

== Subspecies ==
- Suniana sunias sunias (Indonesia) - wide-brand grass-dart
- Suniana sunias rectivitta (Mabille, 1878) (New South Wales, Queensland)
- Suniana sunias sauda Waterhouse, 1937 (Northern Territory) - orange dart
- Suniana sunias tanus (Plötz, 1885) (New Guinea)
- Suniana sunias nihana (Fruhstorfer, 1910)
