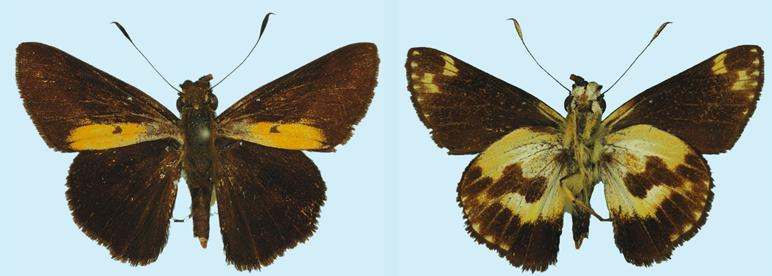
- Upperside (left), underside (right)

Scientific classification
- Kingdom: Animalia
- Phylum: Arthropoda
- Class: Insecta
- Order: Lepidoptera
- Family: Hesperiidae
- Genus: Banta
- Species: B. linnei

Binomial name
- Banta linnei de Jong, 2008

= Banta linnei =

Species of butterfly

Banta linnei is a butterfly of the family Hesperiidae. It is found in Papua on New Guinea.

The length of the forewings is about 18.5 mm.
