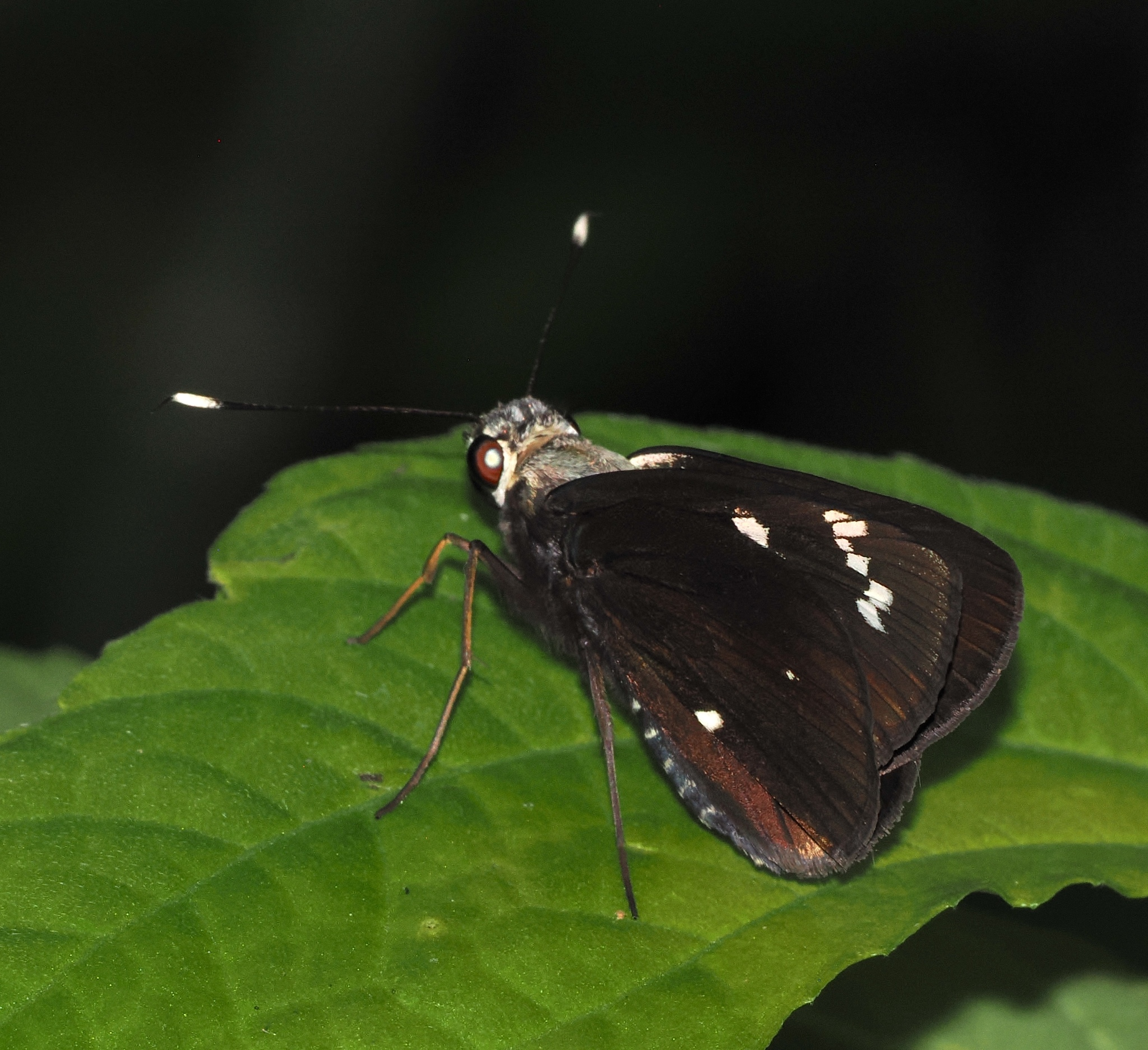

Scientific classification
- Kingdom: Animalia
- Phylum: Arthropoda
- Class: Insecta
- Order: Lepidoptera
- Family: Hesperiidae
- Genus: Mimene
- Species: M. melie

Binomial name
- Mimene melie (de Nicéville, 1895)

= Mimene melie =

Species of butterfly

Mimene melie is a butterfly of the family Hesperiidae. It is endemic to New Guinea.
