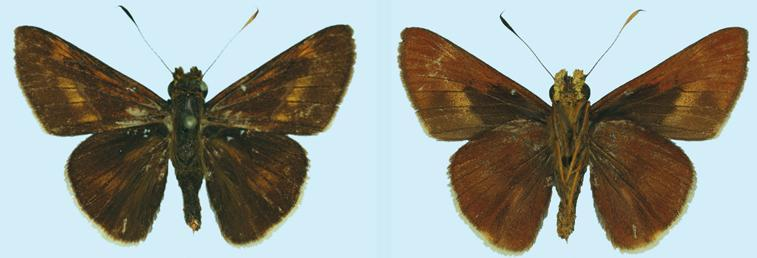
- Upperside (left), underside (right)

Scientific classification
- Kingdom: Animalia
- Phylum: Arthropoda
- Class: Insecta
- Order: Lepidoptera
- Family: Hesperiidae
- Genus: Mimene
- Species: M. toxopei

Binomial name
- Mimene toxopei de Jong, 2008

= Mimene toxopei =

Species of butterfly

Mimene toxopei is a butterfly of the family Hesperiidae. It is found in Papua on New Guinea.

The length of the forewings is 16–17 mm.
