= Kobrona =

Scientific classification
- Kingdom: Animalia
- Phylum: Arthropoda
- Class: Insecta
- Order: Lepidoptera
- Family: Hesperiidae
- Tribe: Taractrocerini
- Genus: Kobrona; Evans, 1934

Genus of butterflies

Kobrona is a genus of skippers in the family Hesperiidae.
