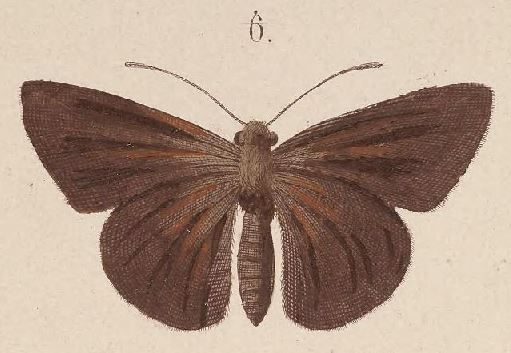

Scientific classification
- Kingdom: Animalia
- Phylum: Arthropoda
- Class: Insecta
- Order: Lepidoptera
- Family: Hesperiidae
- Genus: Mimene
- Species: M. miltias

Binomial name
- Mimene miltias (Kirsch, 1877)

Synonyms
- Ismene miltias Kirsch, 1877

= Mimene miltias =

Species of butterfly

Mimene miltias is a butterfly of the family Hesperiidae. It is found in New Guinea.
