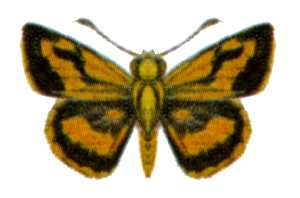

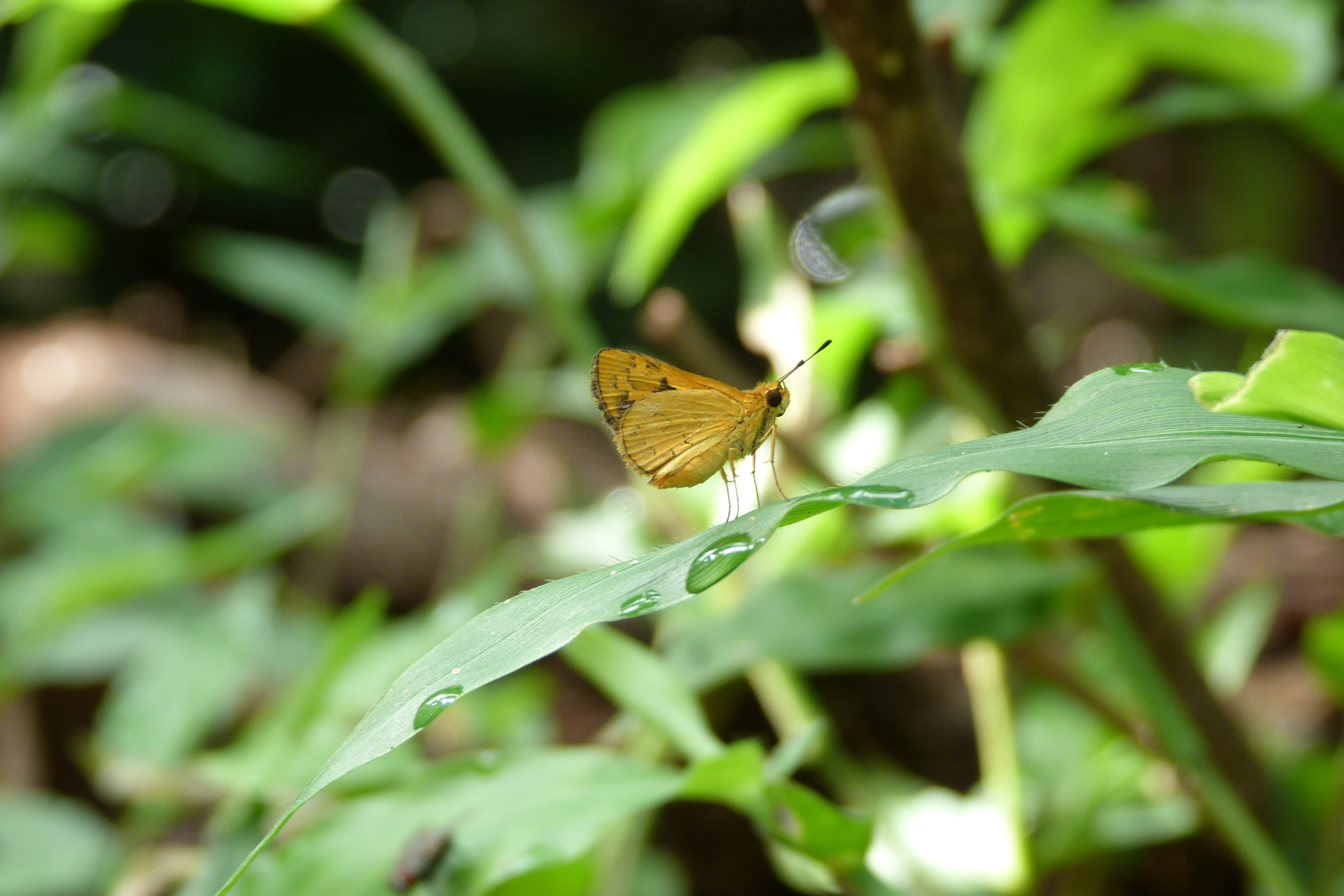

Scientific classification
- Kingdom: Animalia
- Phylum: Arthropoda
- Clade: Pancrustacea
- Class: Insecta
- Order: Lepidoptera
- Family: Hesperiidae
- Genus: Ocybadistes
- Species: O. ardea

Binomial name
- Ocybadistes ardea Bethune-Baker, 1906

Synonyms
- Apaustus heterobathra Lower, 1908; Taractrocera udraka Fruhstorfer, 1910; Padraona ardea Rothschild, 1915; Ocybadistes ardea lucia Evans, 1934

= Ocybadistes ardea =

Species of butterfly

Ocybadistes ardea, the dark orange dart, is a butterfly of the family Hesperiidae. It is found in Indonesia (Papua, the Aru Islands, the Kei Islands), Australia (Queensland) and Papua New Guinea.

The wingspan is about 20 mm.

== Subspecies ==
- Ocybadistes ardea ardea
- Ocybadistes ardea heterobathra
