= Andronymus gander =

Scientific classification
- Kingdom: Animalia
- Phylum: Arthropoda
- Clade: Pancrustacea
- Class: Insecta
- Order: Lepidoptera
- Family: Hesperiidae
- Genus: Andronymus
- Species: A. gander

Binomial name
- Andronymus gander Evans, 1947

Species of butterfly

Andronymus gander, the migrant dart, is a butterfly in the family Hesperiidae. It is found in Nigeria, Burkina Faso, Cameroon, the Republic of the Congo, the eastern part of the Democratic Republic of the Congo, western Uganda and Tanzania (from the north-east to the Usambara Mountains). It is a migratory species.
