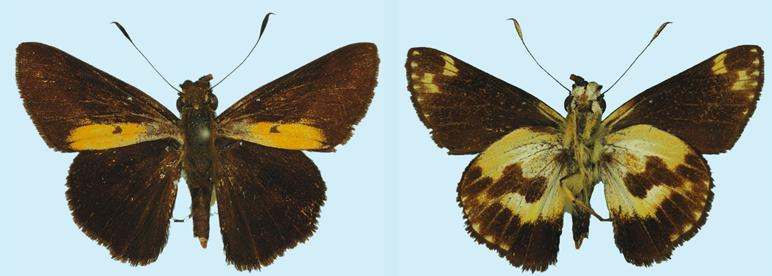
- Banta linnei upperside (left), underside (right)

Scientific classification
- Kingdom: Animalia
- Phylum: Arthropoda
- Class: Insecta
- Order: Lepidoptera
- Family: Hesperiidae
- Tribe: Taractrocerini
- Genus: Banta; Evans, 1949

= Banta (butterfly) =

Genus of butterflies

Banta is a genus of skippers in the family Hesperiidae.

== Species ==
- Banta anna (Evans, 1935)
- Banta banta Evans, 1949
- Banta fulvomargo (Joicey & Noakes, 1916)
- Banta linnei de Jong, 2008
