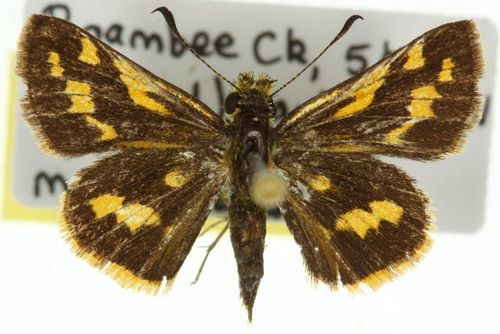

Conservation status
- Endangered (IUCN 3.1)

Scientific classification
- Kingdom: Animalia
- Phylum: Arthropoda
- Class: Insecta
- Order: Lepidoptera
- Family: Hesperiidae
- Genus: Ocybadistes
- Species: O. knightorum

Binomial name
- Ocybadistes knightorum Lambkin & Donaldson, 1994

= Ocybadistes knightorum =

Species of butterfly

Ocybadistes knightorum (common name - Black grass dart) is a butterfly in the family Hesperiidae, first described in 1994 by Trevor A. Lambkin and John F. Donaldson. It is endemic to New South Wales. It has a very limited distribution in the Boambee area. The IUCN Red List lists Ocybadistes knightorum as an endangered species, because of its limited known distribution, and its habitat under threat from weed invasion, sea-rise and continued development. The butterflies are restricted to coastal grassy open-forest areas, that are usually next to mangroves.

The larvae feed on the grass, Alexfloydia repens.
