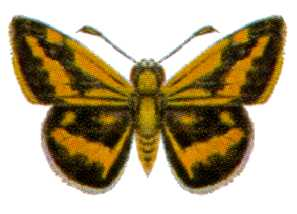

Scientific classification
- Kingdom: Animalia
- Phylum: Arthropoda
- Class: Insecta
- Order: Lepidoptera
- Family: Hesperiidae
- Genus: Ocybadistes
- Species: O. hypomeloma

Binomial name
- Ocybadistes hypomeloma Lower, 1911

Synonyms
- Padraona vaga

= Ocybadistes hypomeloma =

Species of butterfly

Ocybadistes hypomeloma, commonly known as the pale orange dart, is a species of butterfly in the family Hesperiidae. It is found in Australia in New South Wales, the Northern Territory, Queensland and Western Australia.

The wingspan is about 20 mm.

The larvae feed on Themeda triandra, Ischaemum australe and Microlaena stipoides.

== Subspecies ==
- Ocybadistes hypomeloma hypomeloma (New South Wales, Queensland)
- Ocybadistes hypomeloma vaga (Northern Territory, Queensland, Western Australia)
