= Andronymus marina =

Scientific classification
- Domain: Eukaryota
- Kingdom: Animalia
- Phylum: Arthropoda
- Class: Insecta
- Order: Lepidoptera
- Family: Hesperiidae
- Genus: Andronymus
- Species: A. marina

Binomial name
- Andronymus marina Evans, 1937

Species of butterfly

Andronymus marina is a butterfly in the family Hesperiidae. It is found in Uganda (the northern and western shores of Lake Victoria) and north-eastern Zambia.

The larvae are known to feed on Baikiaea eminii.
