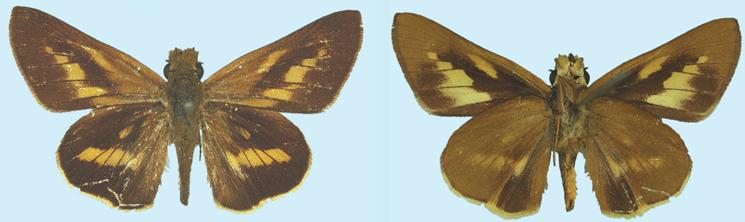
- Pastria grinpela

Scientific classification
- Kingdom: Animalia
- Phylum: Arthropoda
- Class: Insecta
- Order: Lepidoptera
- Family: Hesperiidae
- Tribe: Taractrocerini
- Genus: Pastria; Evans, 1949

= Pastria =

Genus of butterflies

Pastria is a genus of skippers in the family Hesperiidae.

== Species ==
- Pastria albimedia (Joicey & Talbot, 1917)
- Pastria grinpela Parsons, 1986
- Pastria pastria Evans, 1949
