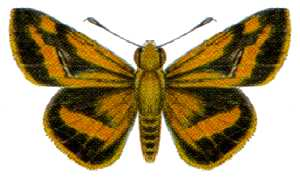
- Arrhenes marnas

Scientific classification
- Kingdom: Animalia
- Phylum: Arthropoda
- Class: Insecta
- Order: Lepidoptera
- Family: Hesperiidae
- Tribe: Taractrocerini
- Genus: Arrhenes; Mabille, 1904

= Arrhenes =

Genus of butterflies

Arrhenes is a genus of skippers in the family Hesperiidae.

== Species ==
- Arrhenes dschilus (Plötz, 1885)
- Arrhenes elena Evans, 1934 New Guinea
- Arrhenes floresia Evans, 1934 Flores, Lesser Sunda Islands, Indonesia
- Arrhenes germana (Rothschild, 1916) Snow Mts., 4,000-6,000ft., "Dutch New Guinea",
- Arrhenes marnas (Felder, 1860)
- Arrhenes martha Evans, 1934 Utkwa River "Dutch" New Guinea
- Arrhenes tranquila (Swinhoe, 1905) Milne Bay. New Guinea.
