= Alexfloydia =

Scientific classification
- Kingdom: Plantae
- Clade: Tracheophytes
- Clade: Angiosperms
- Clade: Monocots
- Clade: Commelinids
- Order: Poales
- Family: Poaceae
- Subfamily: Panicoideae
- Supertribe: Panicodae
- Tribe: Paniceae
- Subtribe: Cenchrinae
- Genus: Alexfloydia; B.K.Simon
- Species: A. repens

Binomial name
- Alexfloydia repens B.K.Simon

Genus of grasses

Alexfloydia is a genus of perennial stoloniferous grasses in the panic grass subfamily of the Poaceae grass family.

This genus is endemic to coastal eastern New South Wales in Australia.

There is one known species, Alexfloydia repens. This genus was named in honour of the species discoverer, Australian botanist Alexander Floyd (1926-2022).

== Habitat and distribution ==
Alexfloydia repens is a spreading, mat-forming grass found on the margins of brackish and tidal waterways in areas flooded by unusually high tides (called "king tides"). The species forms a groundcover associated with the tree species Casuarina glauca and the Endangered Ecological Community Swamp Oak Floodplain Forest. Currently this grass is known only from a few locations in the Coffs Harbour region.

== Status ==
This species is listed as Endangered on the schedules of the NSW Threatened Species Act.

== Ecology ==
Alexfloydia repens is the sole larval food plant for the endangered Black grass-dart butterfly (Ocybadistes knightorum) (Lambkin & Donaldson, 1994).

== See also ==
- List of Poaceae genera
