= Andronymus fontainei =

Scientific classification
- Kingdom: Animalia
- Phylum: Arthropoda
- Class: Insecta
- Order: Lepidoptera
- Family: Hesperiidae
- Genus: Andronymus
- Species: A. fontainei

Binomial name
- Andronymus fontainei T.B. Larsen & Congdon, 2012

Species of butterfly

Andronymus fontainei is a butterfly in the family Hesperiidae. It is found in the Democratic Republic of the Congo and is possibly endemic to the Albertine Rift.
