= Andronymus fenestrella =

Scientific classification
- Domain: Eukaryota
- Kingdom: Animalia
- Phylum: Arthropoda
- Class: Insecta
- Order: Lepidoptera
- Family: Hesperiidae
- Genus: Andronymus
- Species: A. fenestrella

Binomial name
- Andronymus fenestrella Bethune-Baker, 1908

Synonyms
- Pardaleodes alenica Strand, 1912 (also listed as a synonym of Teniorhinus ignita)

Species of butterfly

Andronymus fenestrella is a butterfly in the family Hesperiidae. It is found in Cameroon, the Democratic Republic of the Congo, Uganda, Malawi and northern Zambia. The habitat consists of forests.
