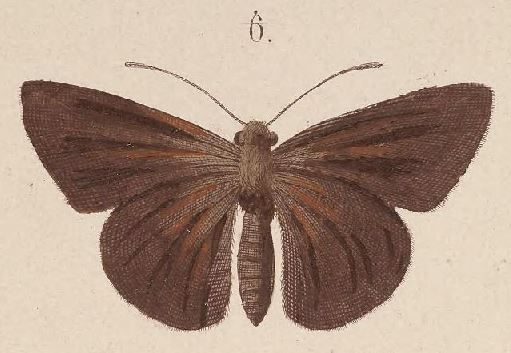
- Mimene miltias

Scientific classification
- Kingdom: Animalia
- Phylum: Arthropoda
- Class: Insecta
- Order: Lepidoptera
- Family: Hesperiidae
- Tribe: Taractrocerini
- Genus: Mimene; Joicey & Talbot, 1917

Type species
- Ismene miltias (Kirsch, 1877)

= Mimene =

Genus of butterflies

Mimene is an Australasian genus of grass skippers in the family Hesperiidae.

== Species ==
- Mimene albiclavata (Butler, 1882) Duke of York Island, Papua New Guinea
- Mimene albidiscus (Joicey & Talbot, 1917) Biak, Schouten Islands
- Mimene atropatene (Fruhstorfer, 1911)
- Mimene basalis (Rothschild, 1916) New Guinea
- Mimene biakensis Joicey & Talbot, 1917 "Papua"
- Mimene caesar Evans, 1935 Kapaur, Dutch New Guinea, Papua New Guinea
- Mimene celia Evans, 1935 Jobi Island New Guinea
- Mimene celiaba Parsons, 1986 Fly River, Kiunga, New Guinea
- Mimene cyanea (Evans, 1928) "Dutch New Guinea, Kapaur" Papua New Guinea.
- Mimene kolbei (Ribbe, 1899)
- Mimene lysima (Swinhoe, 1905) New Guinea
- Mimene melie (de Nicéville, 1895)
- Mimene milnea Evans, 1935 Milne Bay. New Guinea
- Mimene miltias (Kirsch, 1877)
- Mimene orida (Boisduval, 1832) ) "Offack" Papua
- Mimene ozada Parsons, 1986 Fly River, Kiunga, New Guinea
- Mimene sariba Evans, 1935
- Mimene saribana Parsons, 1986 Sariba Island. Papua New Guinea
- Mimene toxopei de Jong, 2008
- Mimene waigeuensis Joicey & Talbot, 1917 Waigeo ("Waigeu").
- Mimene wandammanensis Joicey & Talbot, 1917 Wandammen Muntains, 3,000-4,000ft. New Guinea
- Mimene wara Parsons, 1986 Bulolo, Morobe Province, New Guinea
