= Buakea =

Scientific classification
- Domain: Eukaryota
- Kingdom: Animalia
- Phylum: Arthropoda
- Class: Insecta
- Order: Lepidoptera
- Superfamily: Noctuoidea
- Family: Noctuidae
- Subfamily: Xyleninae
- Genus: Buakea; Moyal et al., 2011

Genus of moths

Buakea is a genus of moths of the family Noctuidae.

== Species ==
- Buakea kaeuae Moyal et al., 2011
- Buakea obliquifascia Moyal et al., 2011
- Buakea venusta Moyal et al., 2011
