= Buakea venusta =

Scientific classification
- Domain: Eukaryota
- Kingdom: Animalia
- Phylum: Arthropoda
- Class: Insecta
- Order: Lepidoptera
- Superfamily: Noctuoidea
- Family: Noctuidae
- Genus: Buakea
- Species: B. venusta

Binomial name
- Buakea venusta Moyal et al., 2011

Species of moth

Buakea venusta is a species of moth of the family Noctuidae. It is found in Kenya on altitudes of between 636 and 1.066 meters.

The wingspan is 18–22 mm for males and 19–21 mm for females.

The larvae feed on Cynodon aethiopicus. Full-grown larvae reach a length of 25–30 mm.
