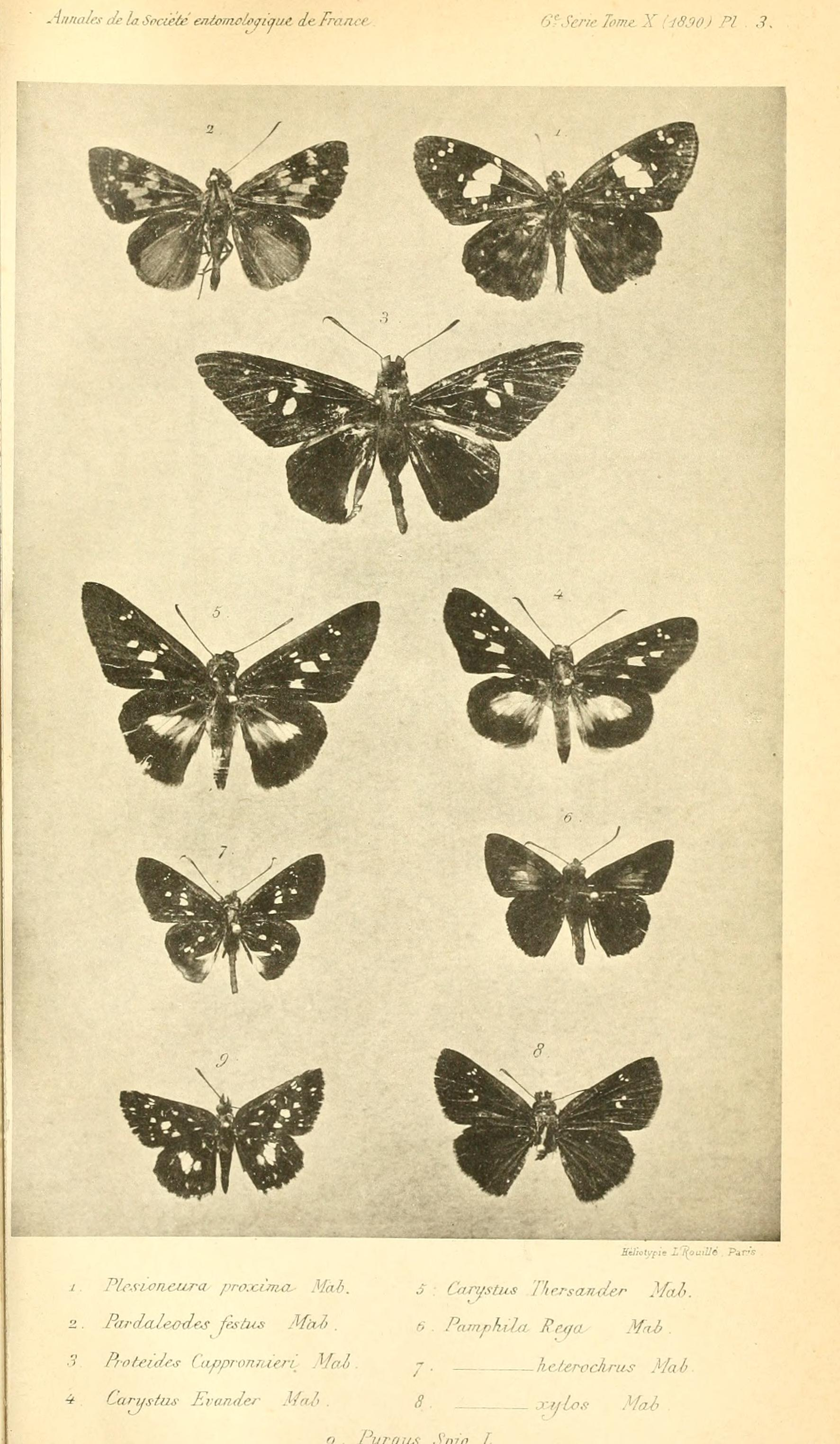

Scientific classification
- Kingdom: Animalia
- Phylum: Arthropoda
- Clade: Pancrustacea
- Class: Insecta
- Order: Lepidoptera
- Family: Hesperiidae
- Genus: Andronymus
- Species: A. evander

Binomial name
- Andronymus evander (Mabille, 1890)

Synonyms
- Carystus evander Mabille, 1890; Pardaleodes kelembaensis Strand, 1918

= Andronymus evander =

Ochreous dart

Species of butterfly

Andronymus evander, the ochreous dart, is a butterfly belonging to the family Hesperiidae. It is found in Sierra Leone, Liberia, Ivory Coast, Ghana, Nigeria, Cameroon, Gabon, the Republic of the Congo, the Central African Republic and the Democratic Republic of the Congo. The habitat consists of forests.

Adults are found feeding on flowers at the edge of the forest.
