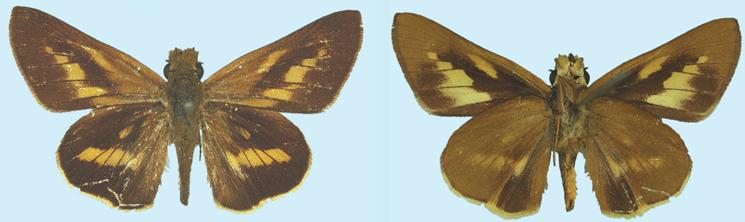
- Upperside (left), underside (right)

Scientific classification
- Kingdom: Animalia
- Phylum: Arthropoda
- Class: Insecta
- Order: Lepidoptera
- Family: Hesperiidae
- Genus: Pastria
- Species: P. grinpela

Binomial name
- Pastria grinpela Parsons, 1986

= Pastria grinpela =

Species of butterfly

Pastria grinpela is a butterfly of the family Hesperiidae. It is widespread throughout the Central Cordillera in Papua New Guinea as well as western New Guinea.
