= Andronymus bjornstadi =

Scientific classification
- Kingdom: Animalia
- Phylum: Arthropoda
- Class: Insecta
- Order: Lepidoptera
- Family: Hesperiidae
- Genus: Andronymus
- Species: A. bjornstadi

Binomial name
- Andronymus bjornstadi Congdon, Kielland & Collins, 1998

Species of butterfly

Andronymus bjornstadi is a butterfly in the family Hesperiidae. It is found in western Tanzania. The habitat consists of forests.
