= Mimene atropatene =

Purple swift

Scientific classification
- Kingdom: Animalia
- Phylum: Arthropoda
- Class: Insecta
- Order: Lepidoptera
- Family: Hesperiidae
- Genus: Mimene
- Species: M. atropatene

Binomial name
- Mimene atropatene Fruhstorfer, 1911

Synonyms
- Parnara atropatene Fruhstorfer, 1911; Telesto wollastoni Rothschild, 1915

Species of insect

Mimene atropatene, the purple swift, is a butterfly of the family Hesperiidae. It is found along the north-eastern coast of Queensland, as well as on the Aru Islands, Irian Jaya and Papua New Guinea.

Its wingspan is about 40 mm.
