= Andronymus helles =

Scientific classification
- Kingdom: Animalia
- Phylum: Arthropoda
- Clade: Pancrustacea
- Class: Insecta
- Order: Lepidoptera
- Family: Hesperiidae
- Genus: Andronymus
- Species: A. helles

Binomial name
- Andronymus helles Evans, 1937

Species of butterfly

Andronymus helles, the lesser ochreous dart, is a butterfly in the family Hesperiidae. It is found in Sierra Leone, Liberia, Ivory Coast, Burkina Faso, Ghana, Nigeria, Cameroon, Gabon, the Republic of the Congo, the Central African Republic, Angola, the Democratic Republic of the Congo and Uganda. The habitat consists of forests.
