= Andronymus marcus =

Scientific classification
- Domain: Eukaryota
- Kingdom: Animalia
- Phylum: Arthropoda
- Class: Insecta
- Order: Lepidoptera
- Family: Hesperiidae
- Genus: Andronymus
- Species: A. marcus

Binomial name
- Andronymus marcus Usher, 1980

Species of butterfly

Andronymus marcus is a butterfly in the family Hesperiidae. It is found in Ghana, Cameroon, the Republic of the Congo and the Democratic Republic of the Congo.
