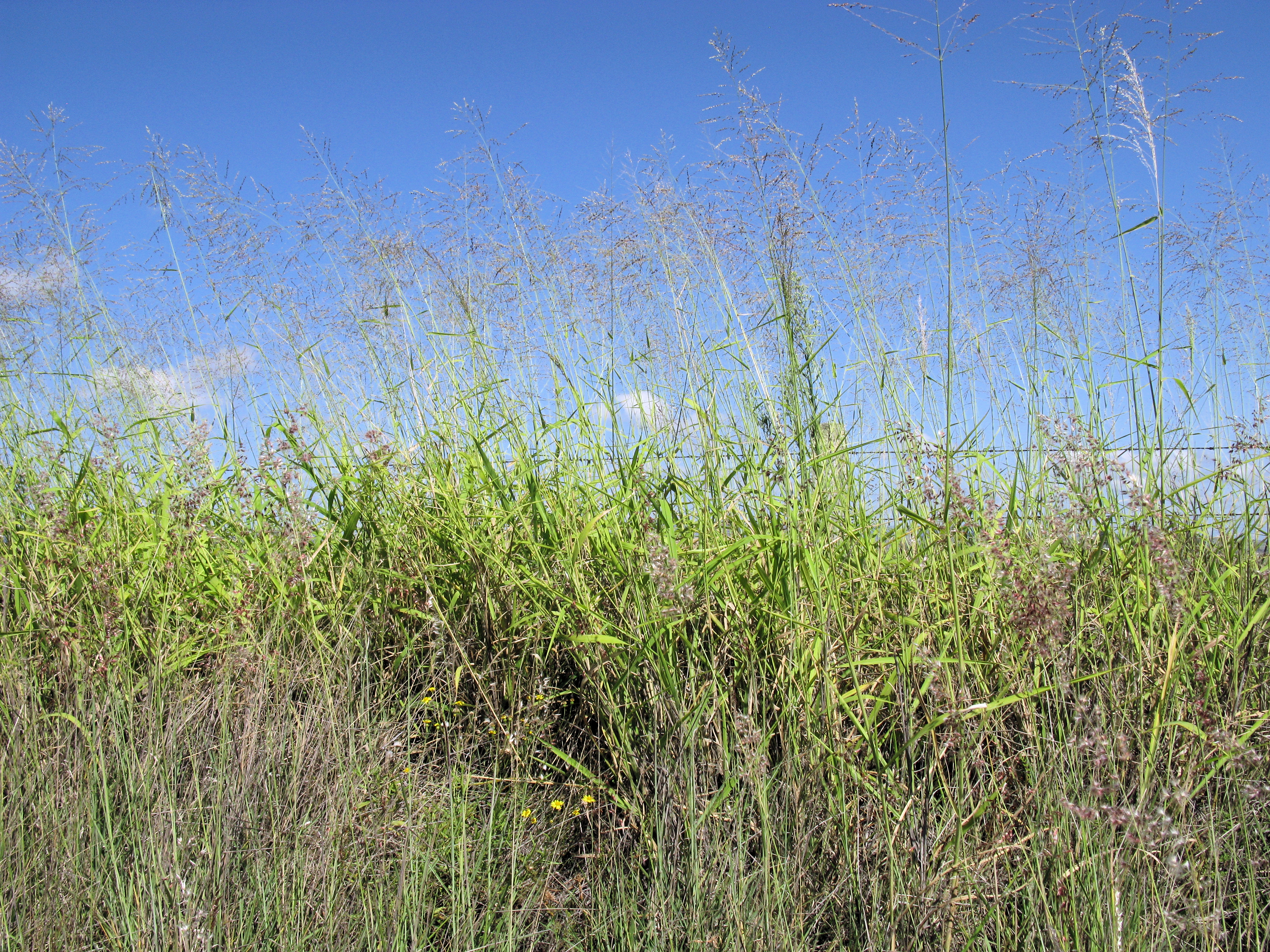
- flower

Scientific classification
- Kingdom: Plantae
- Clade: Tracheophytes
- Clade: Angiosperms
- Clade: Monocots
- Clade: Commelinids
- Order: Poales
- Family: Poaceae
- Subfamily: Panicoideae
- Supertribe: Panicodae
- Tribe: Paniceae
- Subtribe: Melinidinae
- Genus: Megathyrsus (Pilg.) B.K. Simon & S.W.L. Jacobs

Species
- Megathyrsus bivonanus (Brullo, Miniss., Scelsi & Spamp.) Verloove; Megathyrsus infestus (Andersson) B.K.Simon & S.W.L.Jacobs; Megathyrsus maximus (Jacq.) B.K.Simon & S.W.L.Jacobs

Synonyms
- Pseudobrachiaria Launert

= Megathyrsus =

Genus of grasses

Megathyrsus is a genus of plants in the family Poaceae.
