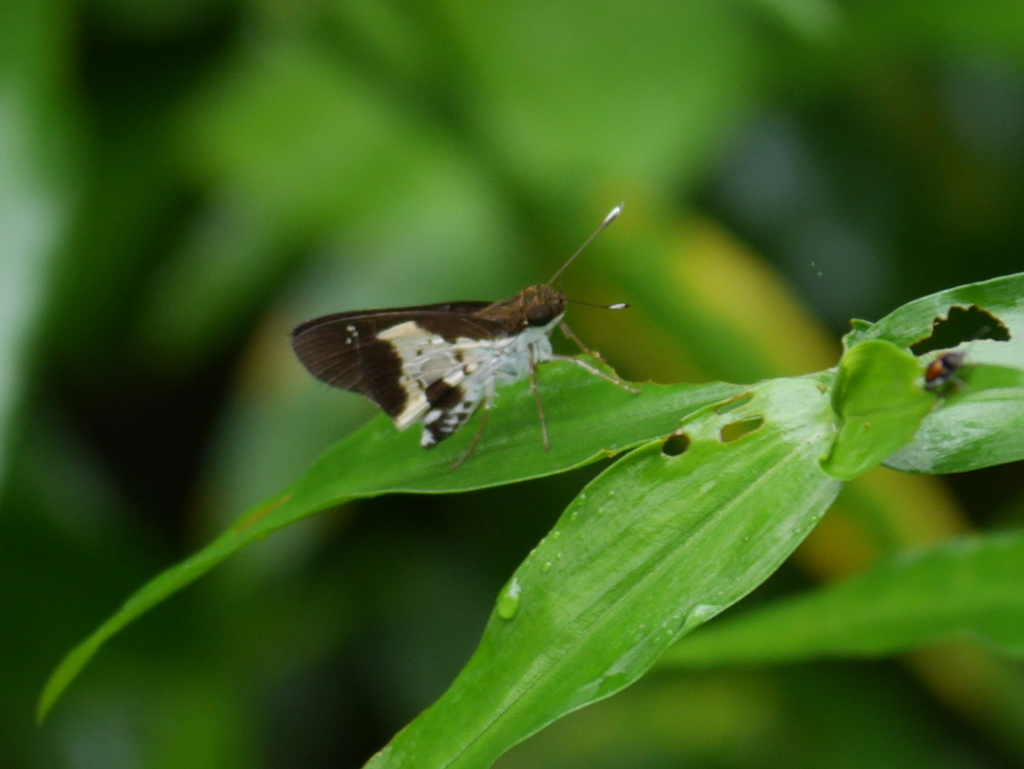

Scientific classification
- Kingdom: Animalia
- Phylum: Arthropoda
- Clade: Pancrustacea
- Class: Insecta
- Order: Lepidoptera
- Family: Hesperiidae
- Genus: Andronymus
- Species: A. hero

Binomial name
- Andronymus hero Evans, 1937

= Andronymus hero =

Species of butterfly

Andronymus hero, the scarce dart, is a butterfly in the family Hesperiidae. It is found in Guinea, Sierra Leone, Liberia, Ivory Coast, Ghana, Nigeria, Cameroon, Gabon, the Republic of the Congo, the Central African Republic, Angola, the Democratic Republic of the Congo, western Tanzania, and north-western and north-eastern Zambia.The habitat consists of forests.

The larvae feed on combretum cuspidum, anthonota macrophylla, and anthonota crassifolia.

Torben Larsen developed a species numbering system for his 2005 publication Butterflies of West Africa. The nominate subspecies is #1368. The 'Larsen' number is used with permission in A Sharp Eye on Butterflies of Ghana, which notes that this species and A. caesar cannot be identified from a picture of the underside alone
