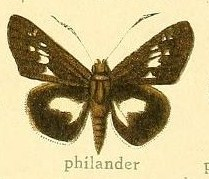
- Andronymus caesar philander

Scientific classification
- Kingdom: Animalia
- Phylum: Arthropoda
- Class: Insecta
- Order: Lepidoptera
- Family: Hesperiidae
- Tribe: Erionotini
- Genus: Andronymus; Holland, 1896

Synonyms
- Acromecis Mabille, 1904

= Andronymus =

Genus of butterflies

Andronymus is an Afrotropical genus of grass skippers in the family Hesperiidae.

== Species ==
- Andronymus bjornstadi Congdon, Kielland & Collins, 1998
- Andronymus caesar Fabricius, 1793
- Andronymus evander Mabille, 1890
- Andronymus fenestrella Bethune-Baker, 1908
- Andronymus fontainei T.B. Larsen & Congdon, 2012
- Andronymus gander Evans, 1947
- Andronymus helles Evans, 1937
- Andronymus hero Evans, 1937
- Andronymus marcus Usher, 1980
- Andronymus marina Evans, 1937
- Andronymus neander Plötz, 1884
