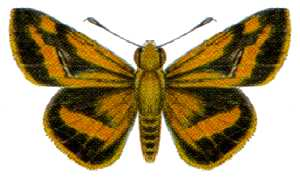

Scientific classification
- Kingdom: Animalia
- Phylum: Arthropoda
- Class: Insecta
- Order: Lepidoptera
- Family: Hesperiidae
- Genus: Arrhenes
- Species: A. marnas

Binomial name
- Arrhenes marnas (Felder, 1860)

Synonyms
- Arrhenes dipavansa (Fruhstorfer, 1911); Arrhenes simillima (Rothschild, 1916); Pamphila marnas Felder, 1860; Ocybadistes affinis Waterhouse & Lyell, 1912

= Arrhenes marnas =

Species of butterfly

Arrhenes marnas, the affinis skipper or swamp darter, is a butterfly of the family Hesperiidae. The species was described by Felder in 1860. It is found from Queensland to Papua.

The larvae feed on Leesia hexandra.

== Subspecies ==
- Arrhenes marnas marnas
- Arrhenes marnas affinis (north-east coastal strip of Queensland)
