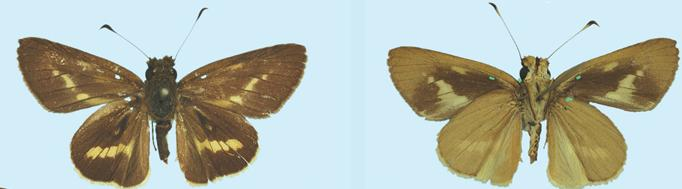
- Upperside (left), underside (right)

Scientific classification
- Kingdom: Animalia
- Phylum: Arthropoda
- Class: Insecta
- Order: Lepidoptera
- Family: Hesperiidae
- Genus: Pastria
- Species: P. pastria

Binomial name
- Pastria pastria Evans, 1949

= Pastria pastria =

Species of butterfly

Pastria pastria is a butterfly of the family Hesperiidae. It is widespread in the mountains of New Guinea, including its type locality, the Mambara River on Mount Kaindi in Papua New Guinea. There are no definite records from Western New Guinea.
