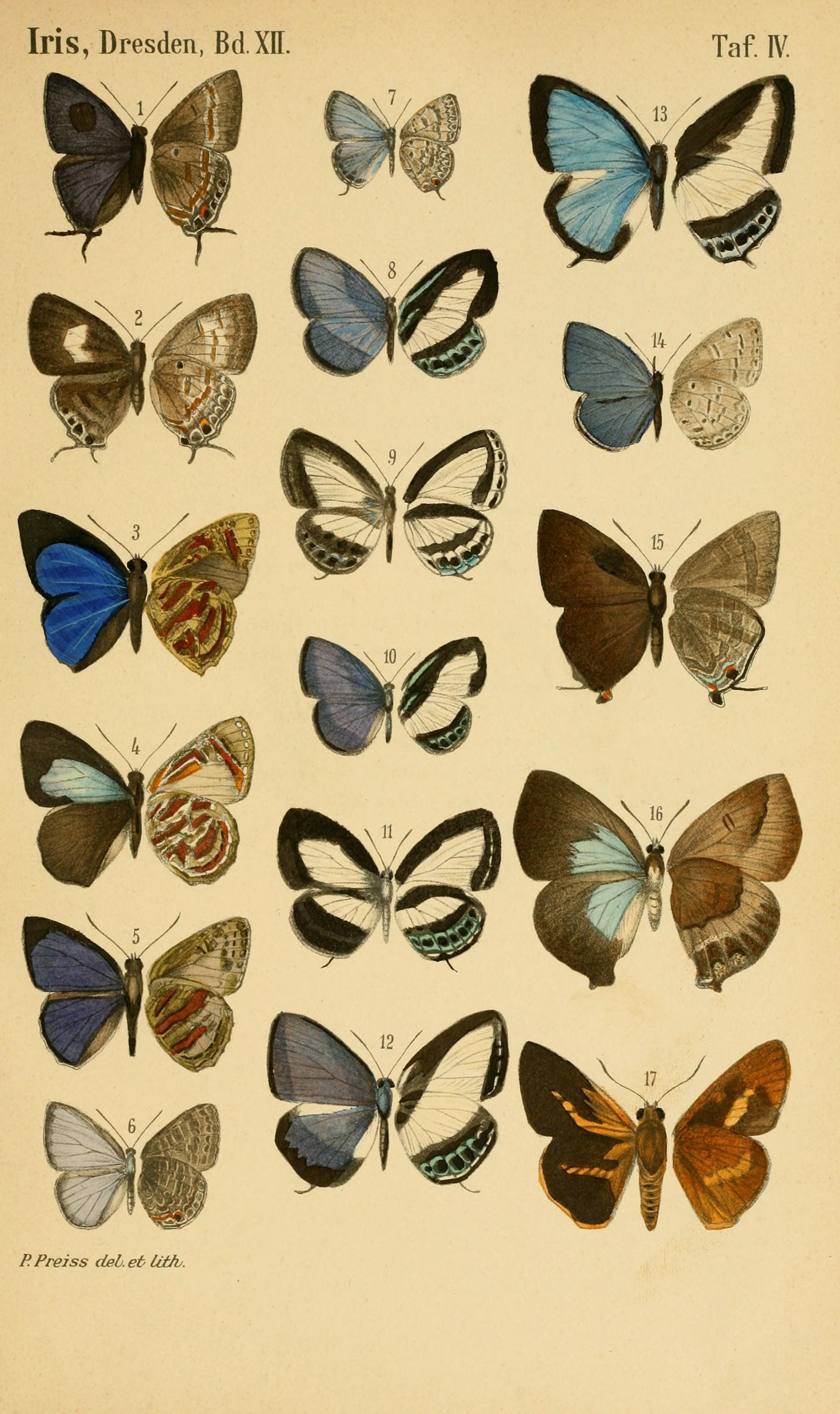
- Plate accompanying the original description

Scientific classification
- Kingdom: Animalia
- Phylum: Arthropoda
- Class: Insecta
- Order: Lepidoptera
- Family: Hesperiidae
- Genus: Mimene
- Species: M. kolbei

Binomial name
- Mimene kolbei (Ribbe, 1899)

= Mimene kolbei =

Species of butterfly

Mimene kolbei is a butterfly of the family Hesperiidae. It is endemic to New Guinea. The name honours Hermann Julius Kolbe.
