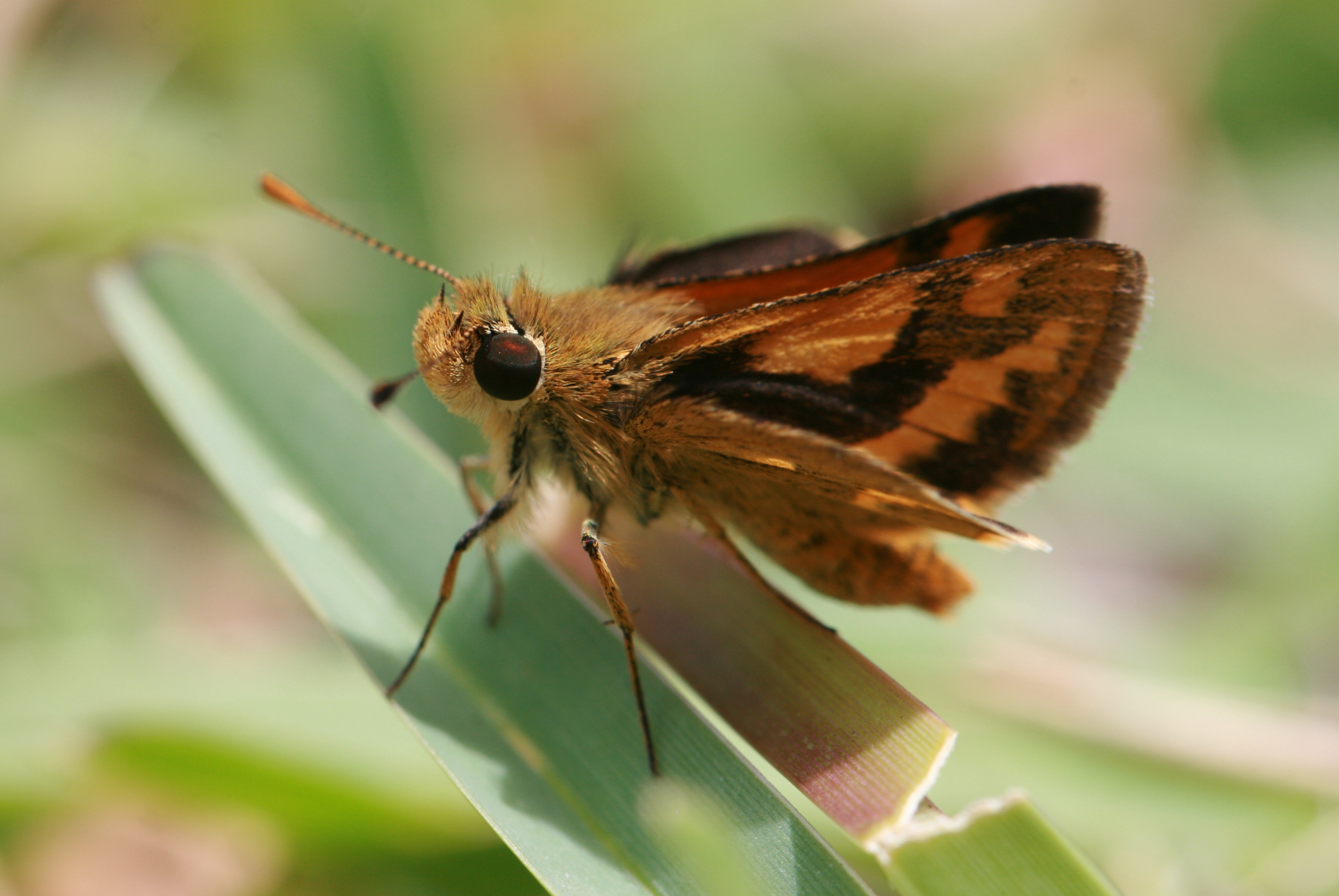

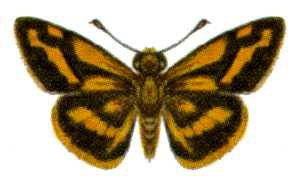

Scientific classification
- Kingdom: Animalia
- Phylum: Arthropoda
- Class: Insecta
- Order: Lepidoptera
- Family: Hesperiidae
- Genus: Ocybadistes
- Species: O. flavovittatus

Binomial name
- Ocybadistes flavovittatus (Latreille, [1824])

Synonyms
- Ocybadistes flavovittata (Latreille, 1824); Hesperia flavovittata Latreille, 1824; Padraona hespera hespera Waterhouse, 1932; Ocybadistes flavovittata ceres Waterhouse, 1933

= Ocybadistes flavovittatus =

Species of butterfly

Ocybadistes flavovittatus, the common dart or narrow-brand grass-dart, is a butterfly of the family Hesperiidae. It is found in Indonesia (Irian Jaya), Australia (New South Wales, Northern Territory, Queensland and Western Australia) and Papua New Guinea.

The wingspan is about 15 mm.

The larvae feed on various grasses.

== Subspecies ==
- Ocybadistes flavovittatus flavovittatus (New South Wales, Queensland)
- Ocybadistes flavovittatus vesta (Northern Territory, Queensland, Western Australia)
