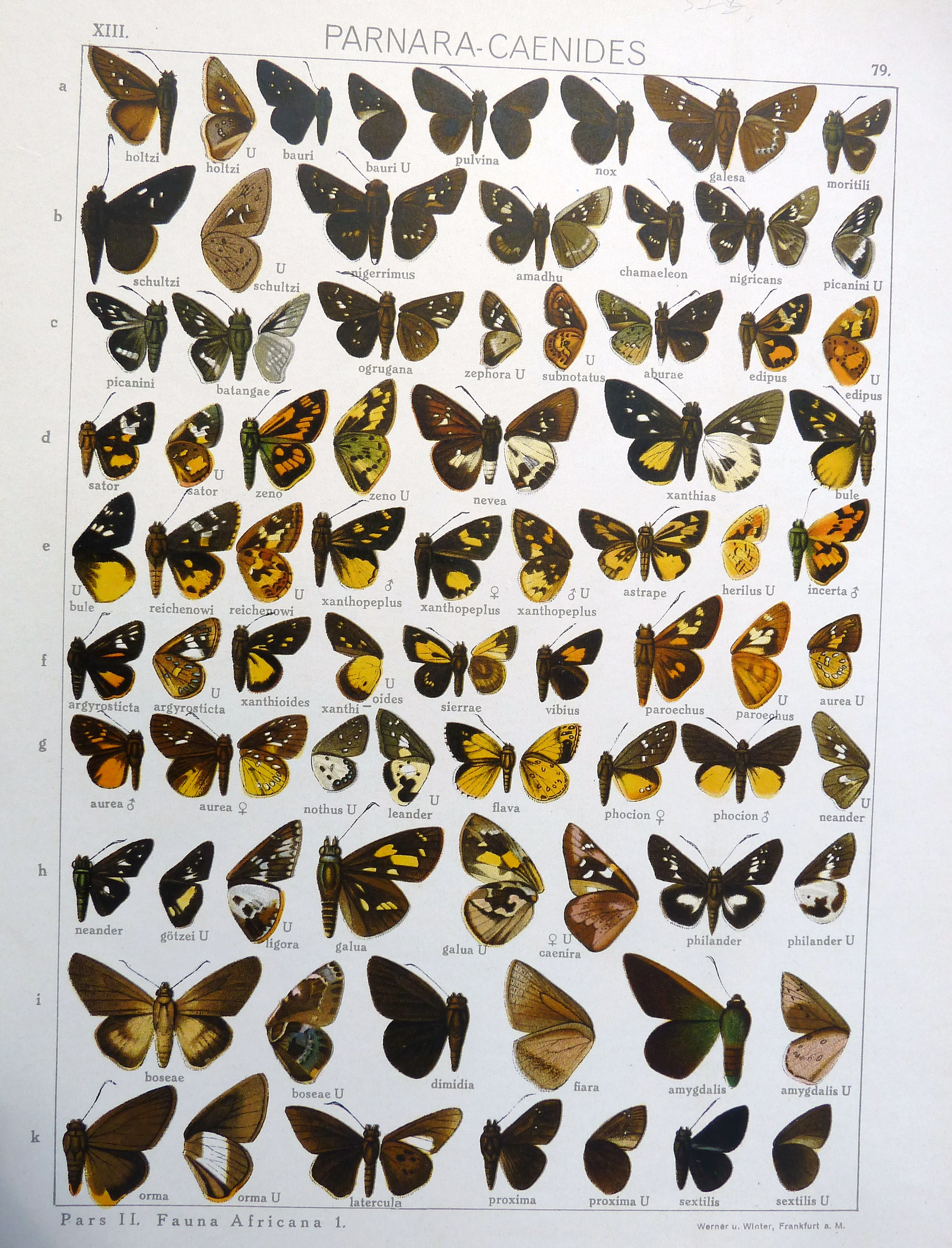
- g

Scientific classification
- Kingdom: Animalia
- Phylum: Arthropoda
- Clade: Pancrustacea
- Class: Insecta
- Order: Lepidoptera
- Family: Hesperiidae
- Genus: Andronymus
- Species: A. caesar

Binomial name
- Andronymus caesar (Fabricius, 1793)

Synonyms
- Hesperia caesar Fabricius, 1793; Pamphila philander Hopffer, 1855; Andronymus hero philander; Apaustus leander Plötz, 1879; Andronymus antonius Lindsey and Miller, 1965

= Andronymus caesar =

Species of butterfly

Andronymus caesar, the white dart or common dart, is a butterfly of the family Hesperiidae. It is found in tropical Africa. The habitat consists of forests, moist savannah and riverine bush, from sea level to altitudes of 1,500 metres.

The wingspan is 38–44 mm. Adults are on wing year-round, but mainly from November to April in South Africa.

The larvae feed on Macrolobium, Blighia (including Blighia unijugata), Deinbollia and Phialodiscus species.

== Subspecies ==
- Andronymus caesar caesar (Guinea, Sierra Leone, Liberia, Ivory Coast, Ghana, Togo, Nigeria, Cameroon, Gabon, Congo, Central African Republic, Angola, Democratic Republic of the Congo: except east and south)
- Andronymus caesar philander (Hopffer, 1855) (Democratic Republic of the Congo: east and south to Shaba, southern Sudan, Uganda, eastern Kenya, Tanzania, Malawi, Zambia, Mozambique, Zimbabwe, South Africa: Limpopo Province to Pafuri, Mpumalanga and the Blyde River Canyon)

Torben Larsen developed a species numbering system for his 2005 publication Butterflies of West Africa. The nominate subspecies is #1367. The 'Larsen' number is used with permission in A Sharp Eye on Butterflies of Ghana, which notes that this species and A. hero cannot be identified from picture of underside alone
