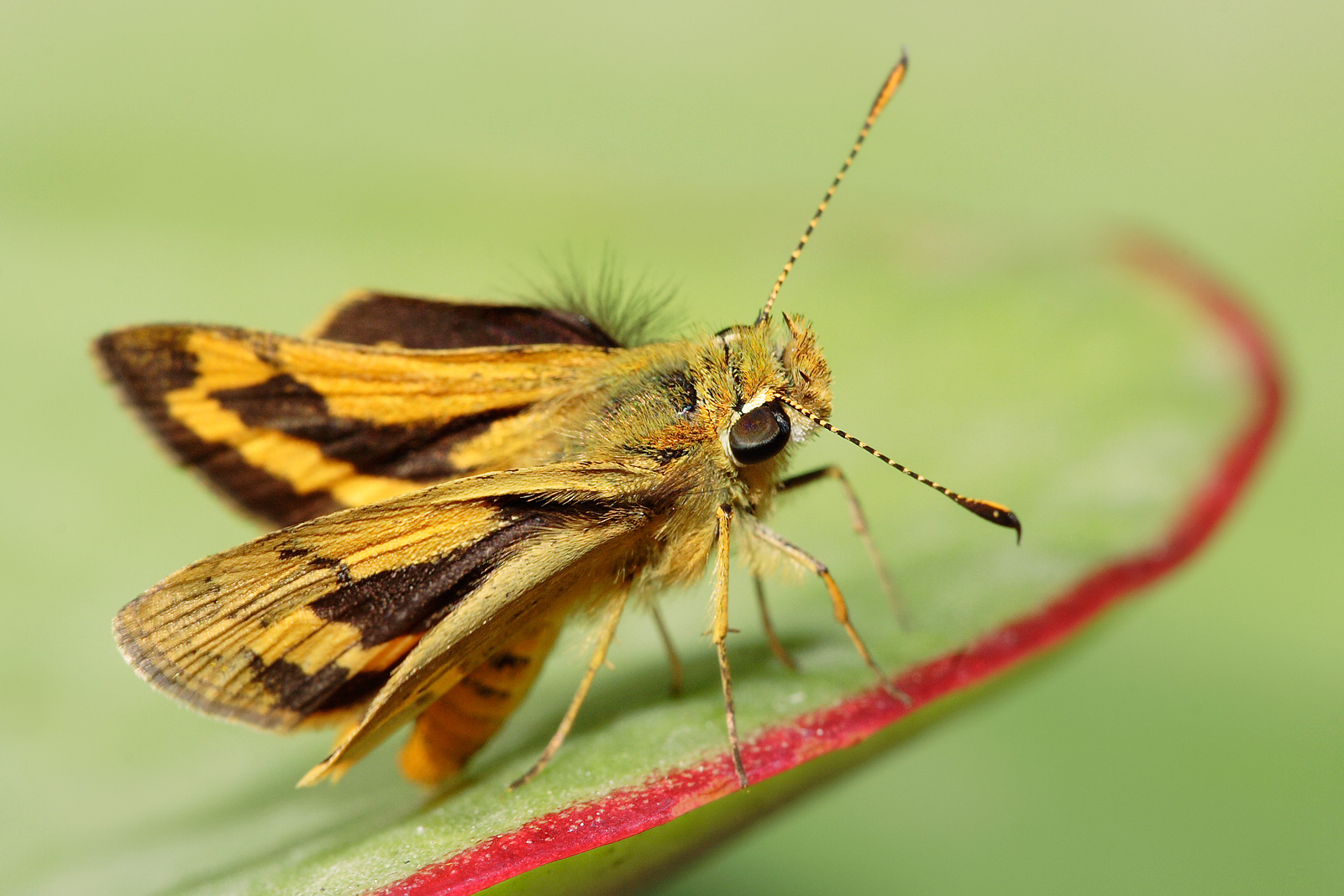
- Ocybadistes walkeri

Scientific classification
- Kingdom: Animalia
- Phylum: Arthropoda
- Class: Insecta
- Order: Lepidoptera
- Family: Hesperiidae
- Tribe: Taractrocerini
- Genus: Ocybadistes; Heron, 1894

= Ocybadistes =

Genus of butterflies

Ocybadistes is a genus of skippers in the family Hesperiidae.

== Species ==
The genus includes the following species:

- Ocybadistes flavovittatus (Latreille, [1824])
- Ocybadistes walkeri Heron, 1894
- Ocybadistes knightorum Lambkin & Donaldson, 1994
- Ocybadistes ardea Bethune-Baker, 1906
- Ocybadistes hypomeloma Lower, 1911
- Ocybadistes papua Evans, 1934
- Ocybadistes zelda Parsons, 1986
