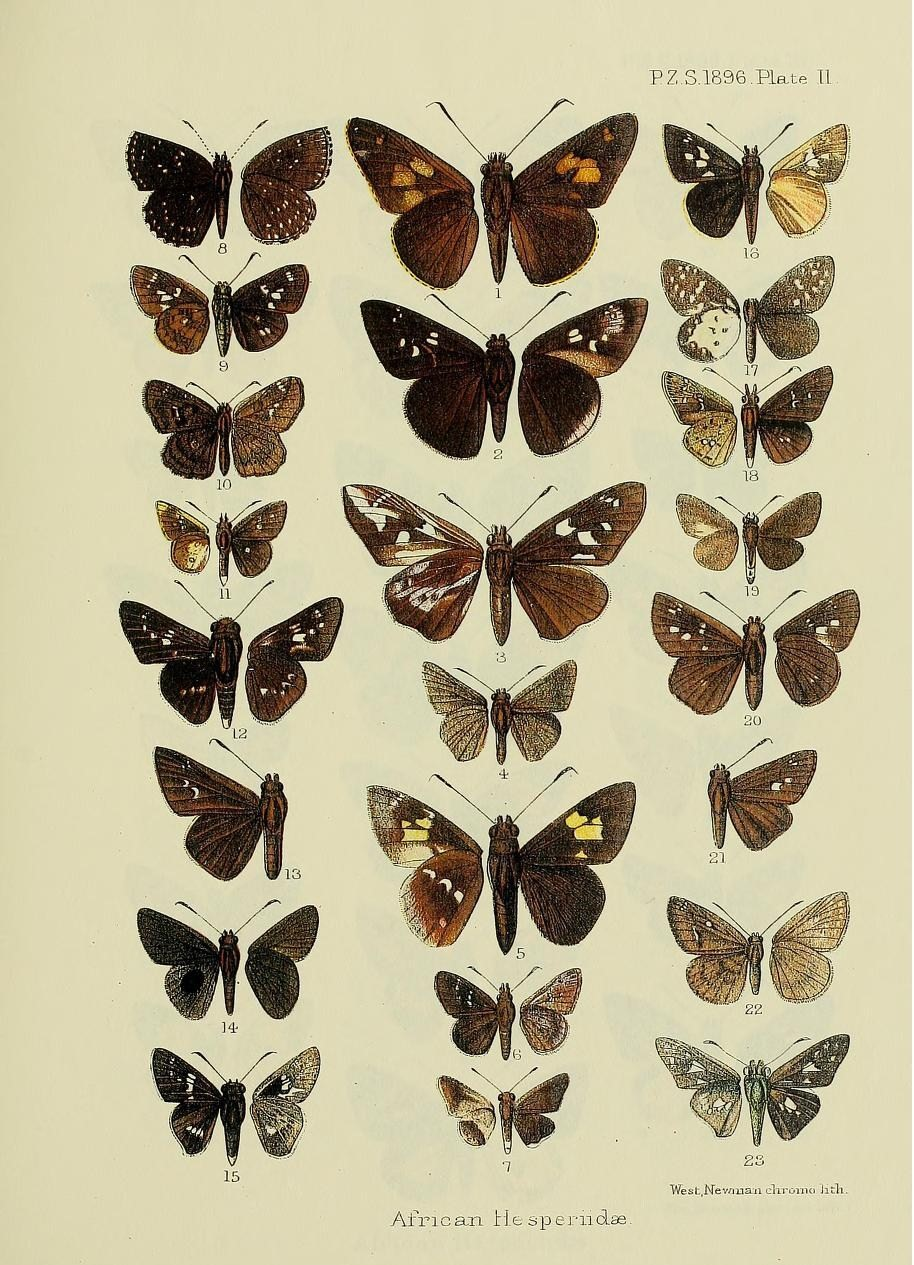
- Andronymus neander figure 23

Scientific classification
- Kingdom: Animalia
- Phylum: Arthropoda
- Clade: Pancrustacea
- Class: Insecta
- Order: Lepidoptera
- Family: Hesperiidae
- Genus: Andronymus
- Species: A. neander

Binomial name
- Andronymus neander (Plötz, 1884)

Synonyms
- Apaustus neander Plötz, 1884; Ancyloxypha producta Trimen & Bowker, 1889; Andronymus neander torosa Evans, 1947; Andronymus thomasi Riley, 1928

= Andronymus neander =

Species of butterfly

Andronymus neander, the common dart or nomad dart, is a butterfly of the family Hesperiidae. It is found in tropical Africa. The habitat consists of moist woodland, forest margins and riparian vegetation, from sea level up to altitudes of 2,400 metres.

The wingspan is 38–46 mm for males and 42–48 mm for females. Adults are on wing from September to April in South Africa. There are continuous generations year-round further north.

The larvae feed on Brachystegia species (including Brachystegia spiciformis), Afzelia africana and Acridocarpus smeathmannii.

== Subspecies ==
- Andronymus neander neander (Senegal, Gambia, Sierra Leone, Liberia, Ivory Coast, Burkina Faso, Ghana, Benin, Nigeria, Cameroon, Gabon, Congo, Central African Republic, Angola, Democratic Republic of the Congo, Uganda, Kenya, Tanzania, Malawi, Zambia, Mozambique, Zimbabwe, Botswana, northern Namibia, Eswatini, South Africa: Limpopo Province, Mpumalanga, Gauteng, KwaZulu-Natal)
- Andronymus neander thomasi Riley, 1928 (São Tomé and Príncipe)
