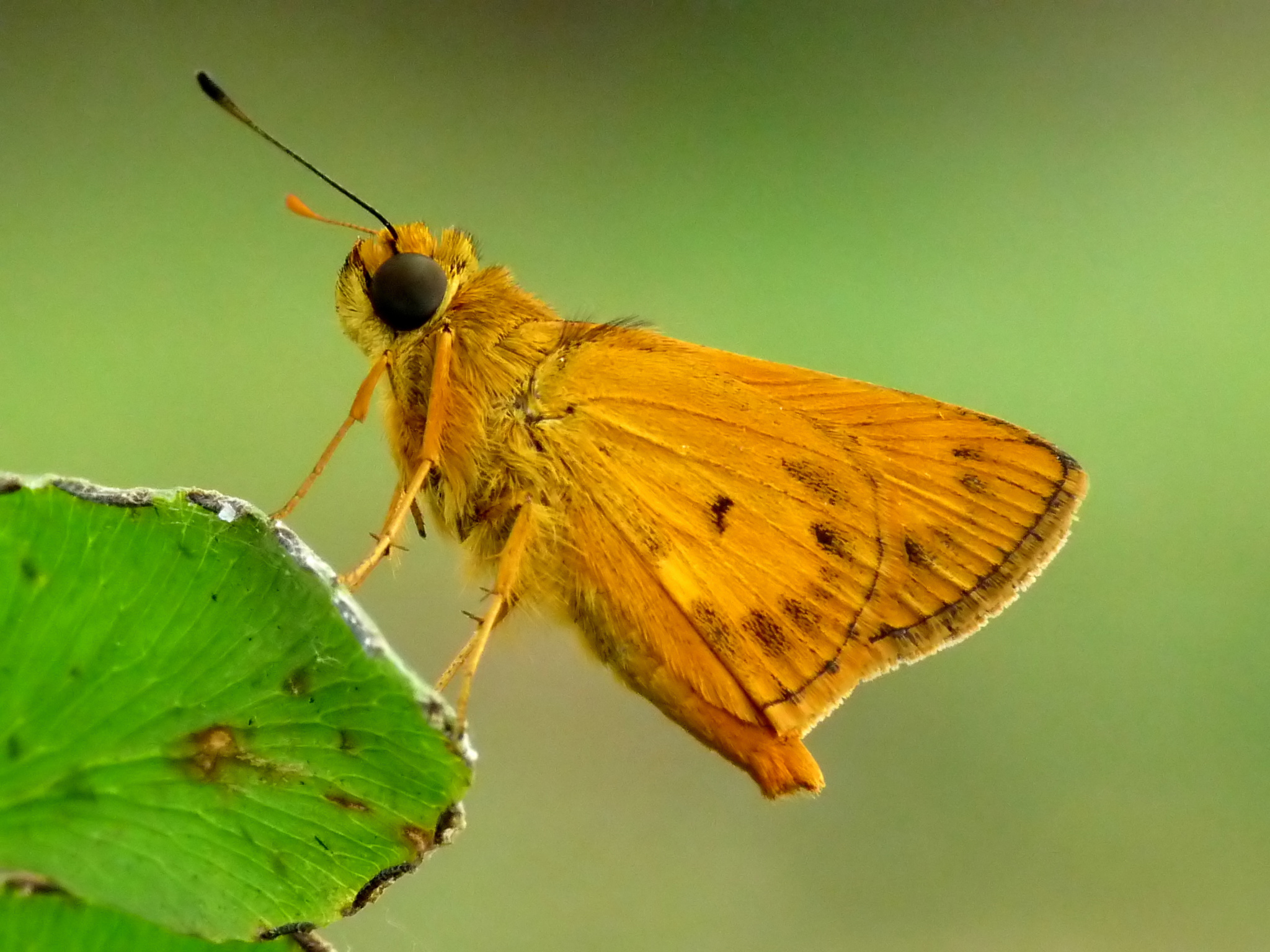
- Oriens goloides

Scientific classification
- Kingdom: Animalia
- Phylum: Arthropoda
- Class: Insecta
- Order: Lepidoptera
- Family: Hesperiidae
- Tribe: Erionotini
- Genus: Oriens; Evans, 1932

Synonyms
- Nicevillea Evans, 1926 (preocc. Nicevillea Hampson, 1895)

= Oriens (butterfly) =

Genus of butterflies

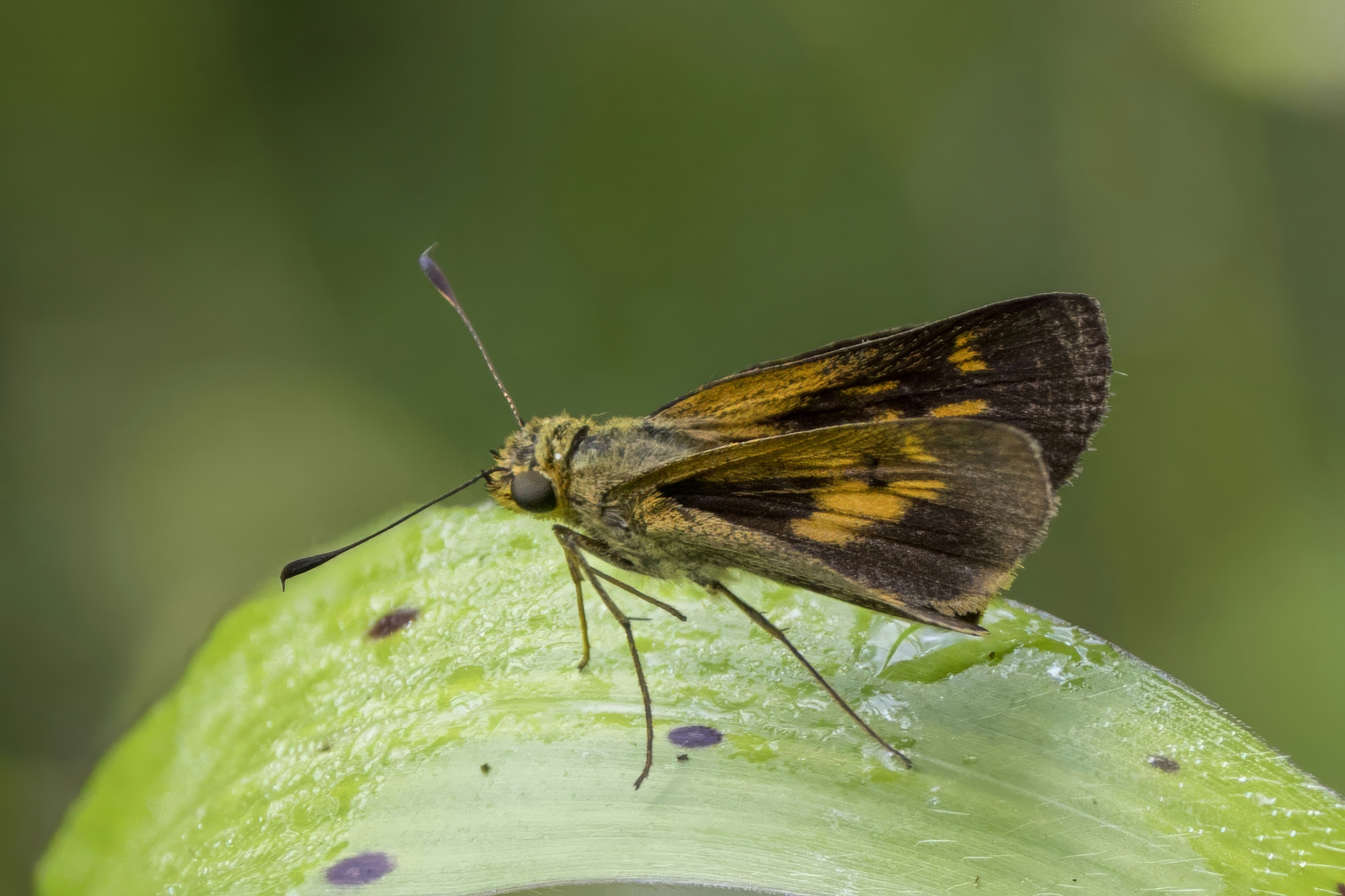
O. augustula, Fiji

Oriens, the dartlets, is a genus of grass skipper butterflies in the subfamily Hesperiinae (Hesperiidae). The genus was described by William Harry Evans in 1932. The six species, all of which look very similar to each other and are often only reliably identifiable through the examination of the male genitalia.

== Species ==
- Oriens alfurus (Plötz, 1885) – Celebes
- Oriens californica (Scudder, 1872) – Philippines
- Oriens fons Evans, 1949 Philippines
- Oriens paragola (de Nicéville & Martin, [1896]) – Sumatra
- Oriens augustula (Herrich-Schäffer, 1869) – Fiji
- Oriens goloides (Moore, [1881]) – Ceylon, India, Nepal, South China to Malay Peninsula.
- Oriens gola (Moore, 1877) – Ceylon, South India, Kumaon, Sikkim to Assam, Burma, Vietnam
- Oriens concinna (Elwes & Edwards, 1897) – India (Shevaroys, Nilgiris, Palnis, Coorg)

== Biology ==
The larvae feed on grasses including Imperata, Oryza, and Paspalum.
