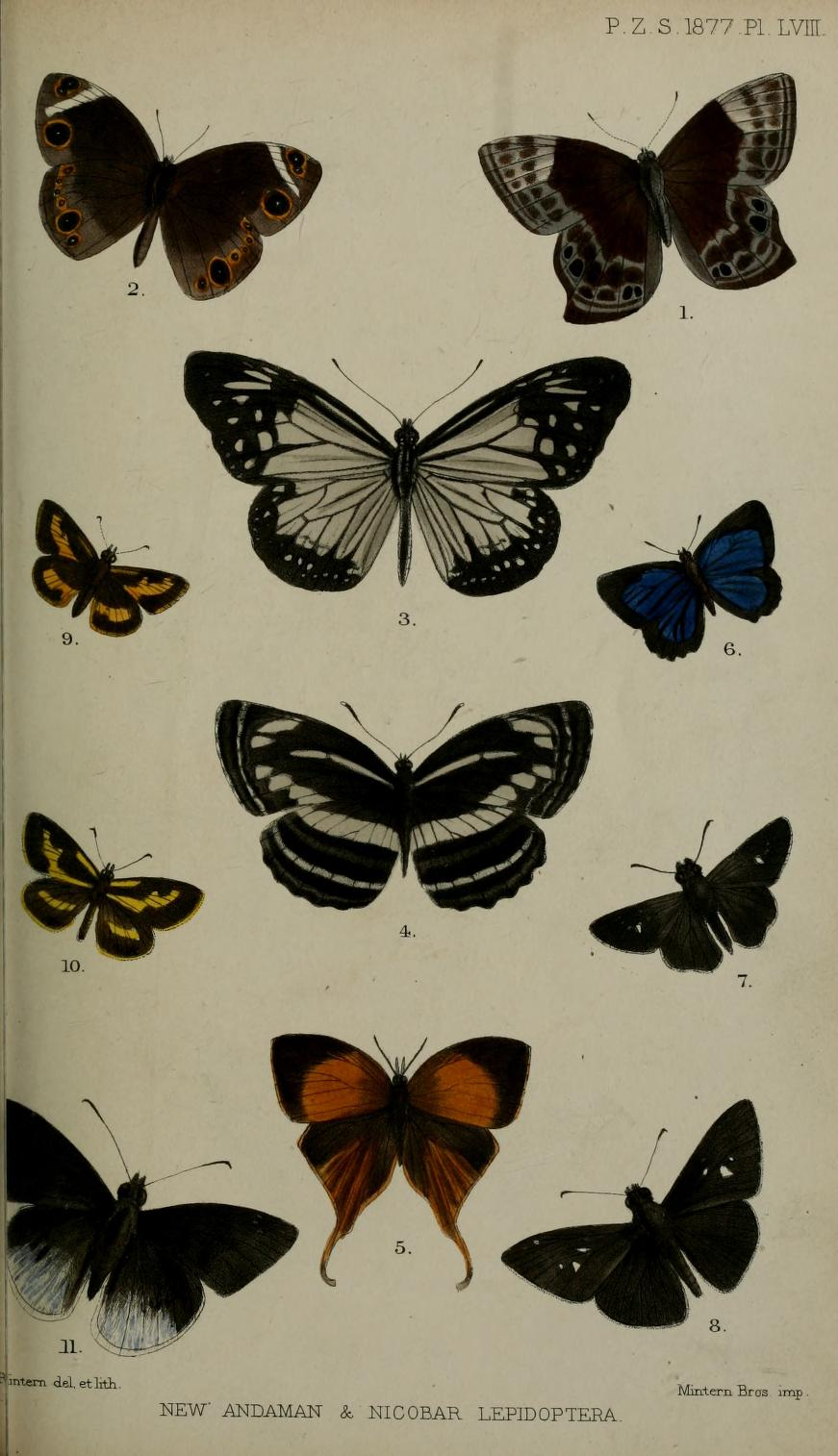
- Oriens gola in Moore, 1877 (figure 9)

Scientific classification
- Kingdom: Animalia
- Phylum: Arthropoda
- Clade: Pancrustacea
- Class: Insecta
- Order: Lepidoptera
- Family: Hesperiidae
- Genus: Oriens
- Species: O. gola

Binomial name
- Oriens gola (Moore, 1877)

Synonyms
- Pamphila gola Moore, 1877; Pamphila pseudolus Mabille, 1883; Telicota gola rajagriha Fruhstorfer, 1911; Telicota gola trishna Fruhstorfer, 1911; Telicota gola nipata Fruhstorfer, 1911

= Oriens gola =

Species of butterfly

Oriens gola, the common dartlet, is a butterfly of the family Hesperiidae. It is found from Sri Lanka and India (Kumaon, Sikkim, Assam) to Burma, Thailand, Vietnam, Peninsular Malaysia, Borneo and Sumatra.

The wingspan is about 22–27 mm. The ground colour of the wings is dark brown. There are yellowish-orange or amber-colored discal bands on both the forewings and hindwings, defined by black shading on the underside. The veins within the bands are not darkened. The verso resemmbles the recto but the yellow is more extensive.

The larvae feed on Imperata and Paspalum species, as well as Ottochloa nodosa.

== Subspecies ==
- Oriens gola gola
- Oriens gola nipata (Fruhstorfer, 1911) (Sumnba)
- Oriens gola pseudolus (Mabille, 1883) (Vietnam)
- Oriens gola yunnana Lee, 1962
