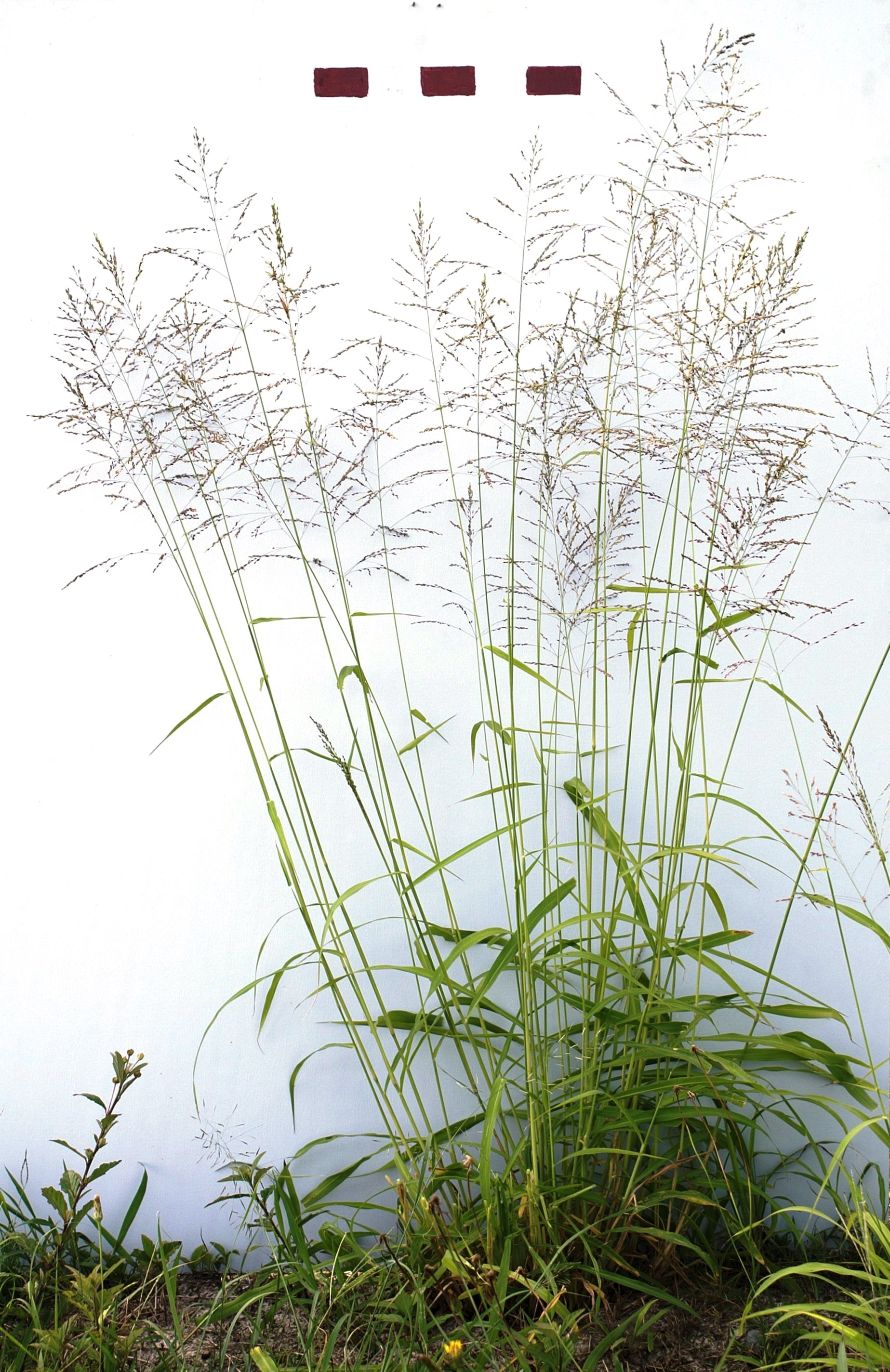

Scientific classification
- Kingdom: Plantae
- Clade: Tracheophytes
- Clade: Angiosperms
- Clade: Monocots
- Clade: Commelinids
- Order: Poales
- Family: Poaceae
- Subfamily: Panicoideae
- Genus: Megathyrsus
- Species: M. maximus

Binomial name
- Megathyrsus maximus (Jacq.) B.K.Simon & S.W.L.Jacobs, 2003

Synonyms
- Panicum hirsutissimum Steud.; Panicum maximum Jacq.; Urochloa maxima (Jacq.) R.D.Webster

= Megathyrsus maximus =

Species of plant

Megathyrsus maximus, known as Guinea grass and green panic grass, is a large perennial bunch grass that is native to Africa and Yemen. It has been introduced in the tropics around the world. It has previously been called Urochloa maxima and Panicum maximum. It was moved to the genus Megathyrsus in 2003.

== Description ==
Megathyrsus maximus grows naturally in open grasslands, usually under or near trees and shrubs and along riverbanks. It can withstand wildfire and drought. The species has broad morphological and agronomic variability, ranging in height from 0.5 to 3.5 m (1.6 to 11.5 ft), with 5–10 cm (2.0–3.9 in) stems. The polyploid plant also can reproduce through apomixis, effectively cloning itself through seed. Panicles are open, with as many as 9,000 seeds per plant.

== Uses ==
It can be used as a long-term foraging grass if grazed consistently and if fertilized. It is well suited for cut-and-carry, a practice in which grass is harvested and brought to a ruminant animal in an enclosed system. Shade tolerance makes it suited to coexisting with trees in agroforestry. Some varieties have been used successfully for making silage and hay. The leaves contain good levels of protein (6–25% depending on age and nitrogen supply).

== Invasive species ==
In some places, such as South Texas and Hawai'i, it is an invasive weed that suppresses or displaces local native plants and is a fire hazard.

In the Australian state of Queensland, the Queensland Acclimatisation Society introduced Guinea grass to 22 locations between 1865 and 1869.

== See also ==
- 2023 Hawaii wildfires
