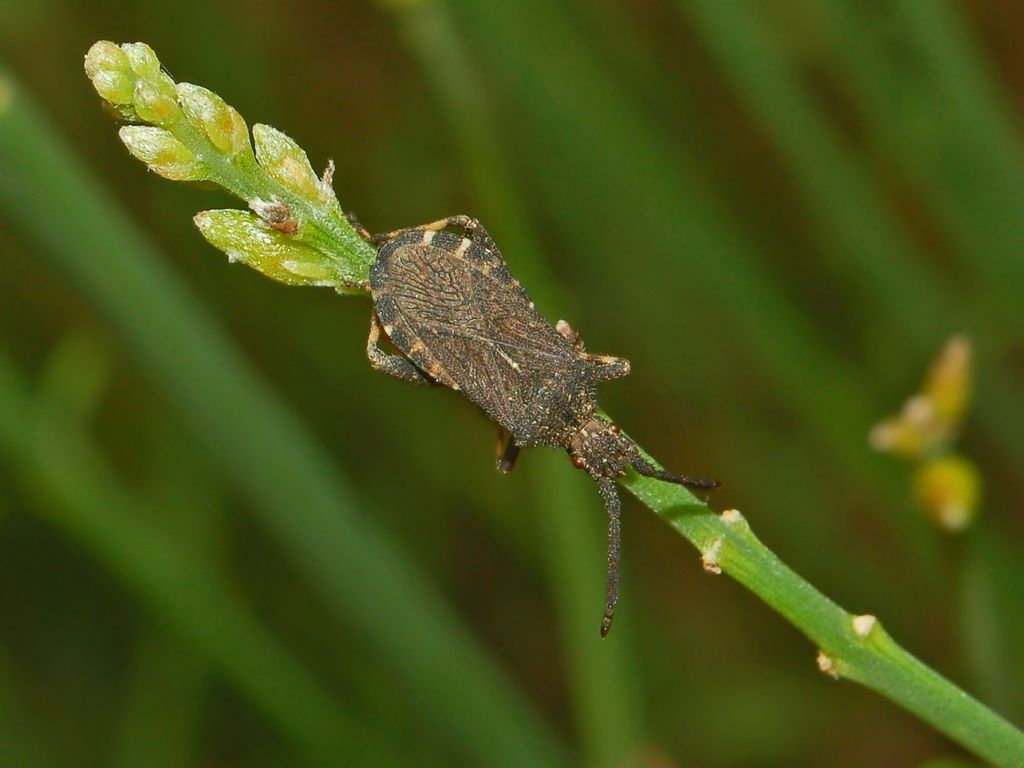
- Bothrostethus annulipes, dorsal view

Scientific classification
- Kingdom: Animalia
- Phylum: Arthropoda
- Class: Insecta
- Order: Hemiptera
- Suborder: Heteroptera
- Family: Coreidae
- Genus: Bothrostethus
- Species: B. annulipes

Binomial name
- Bothrostethus annulipes (Herrich-Schaeffer, 1835)

Synonyms
- Coreus annulipes Herrich-Schäffer, 1835; Bothrostethus annulipes var. sabulicola Horváth, 1895

= Bothrostethus annulipes =

Species of true bug

Bothrostethus annulipes is a species of bug in the Coreidae family, subfamily Pseudophloeinae.

== Distribution ==
This species can be found in Europe. It is non present in the Britain Islands nor in the Nordic countries.

== Description ==
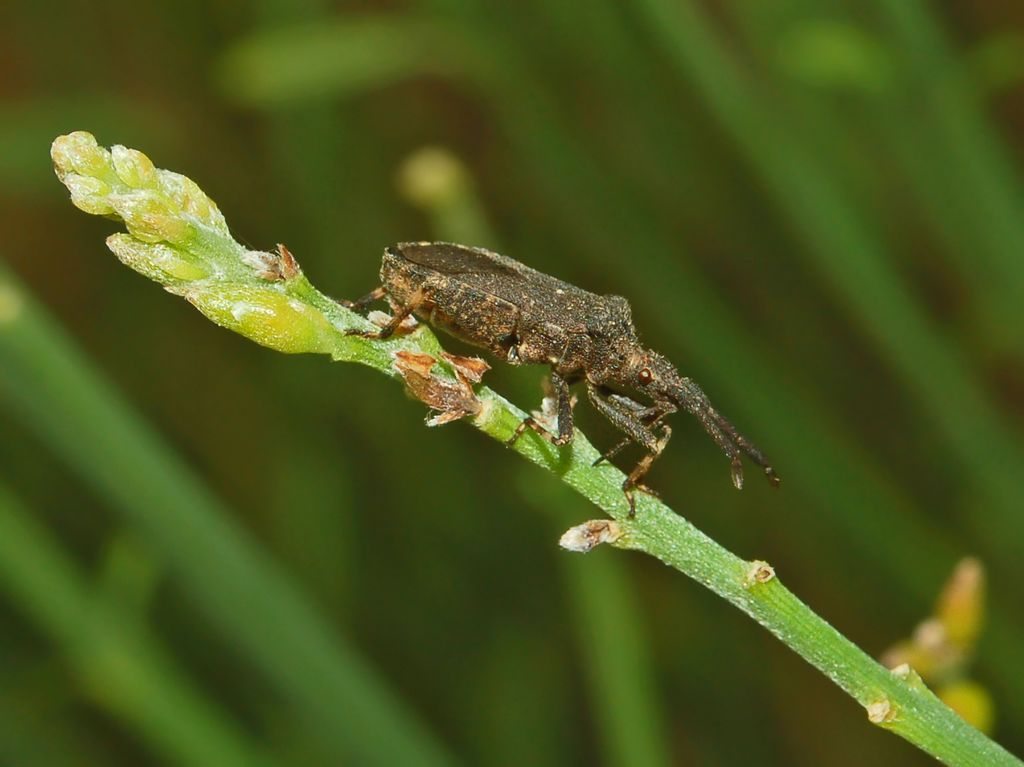
Side view

Bothrostethus annulipes can reach a length of about 9–10 millimetres (0.35–0.39 in). Body is black-brown. Connexivum is yellow spotted. The margin of the pronotum is finely denticulate. The humeral tooth is very obvious and curved to the outside. A black median notch is present on the front of the pronotum. The apex of the scutellum is clear, almost white. The tibias are yellow, darker towards the end.

This species is rather similar to Centrocoris spiniger, Centrocoris variegatus and Gonocerus insidiator.

== Biology ==
These herbivore insects are trophically associated with leguminous plants. They mainly feed on Bromus species. Adult males have the unusual behaviour of feeding on excrements.

== Bibliography ==
- Moulet. 1995. Faune de France 81:150 - Identification W Palaearctic. - Bothrostethus annulipes
- Dolling. 2006. In Aukema & Rieger Ed. - Catalogue of Heteroptera of the Palaearctic Region 5:48
- Carl W. Schaefer, Paula Levin Mitchell - Food Plants of the Coreoidea (Hemiptera: Heteroptera) - Ann Entomol Soc Am (1983) 76 (4): 591–615.
