= Pseudotheraptus wayi =

Scientific classification
- Kingdom: Animalia
- Phylum: Arthropoda
- Clade: Pancrustacea
- Class: Insecta
- Order: Hemiptera
- Suborder: Heteroptera
- Family: Coreidae
- Subfamily: Coreinae
- Tribe: Gonocerini
- Genus: Pseudotheraptus
- Species: P. wayi

Binomial name
- Pseudotheraptus wayi Brown, 1955

Species of true bug

Pseudotheraptus wayi, the coconut bug, is a species of leaf-footed bug in the family Coreidae. It is a pest of coconut in East Africa.

== Distribution ==
P. wayi is found in tropical and subtropical Africa, its range including Côte d'Ivoire, Kenya, Tanzania, Zanzibar, Zambia, Botswana, and South Africa.

== Life cycle ==
Eggs are laid on host plants and take 30 to 40 days to develop, depending on external conditions. As a true bug, this species goes through incomplete metamorphosis, the nymph passing through five instar stages. The adult females survive for up to 2 months, laying two or three eggs a day.

== Host range ==
P. wayi is a pest of coconut and various other fruit crops. It attacks the growing points of shoots, flowers (where it may cause petal drop), and fruit (where it may cause abnormal shape, pitting, brown or black lesions, exudation of gum, and fruit drop).

In coconuts, young nymphs feed at the base of male flowers, and older nymphs and adults feed on the female flowers and developing nuts. The toxic saliva that they inject causes lesions and fruit drop, but as up to 70% of the young fruit may fall naturally, establishing the prevalence of the pest is difficult. In Zanzibar, up to 100% loss of the crop has been reported. On macadamia, the damage is similar, and fruit that do not drop may have distorted kernels.

Avocados, guavas, and mangoes develop pock-like lesions or soft, circular patches resembling hail damage. The fruit does not rot but can be disfigured, and many affected mango fruits drop. Pecans are also involved in fruit drop when attacked in the early stages, and when attacked later, the kernels may have black stains, which render them valueless.

== Ecology ==
Natural enemies of P. wayi include the egg parasitic wasps Anastatus, Ooencyrtus, and Trissolcus. Predators include the ant Anoplolepis custodiens and the African weaver ant (Oecophylla longinoda). The weaver ant is effective as a biological pest control agent and is sometimes introduced into coconut palm plantations to control P. wayi. When researching how best to control the pest, rearing it on green beans has been found possible and convenient.
