= Hewitsonia danane =

Scientific classification
- Domain: Eukaryota
- Kingdom: Animalia
- Phylum: Arthropoda
- Class: Insecta
- Order: Lepidoptera
- Family: Lycaenidae
- Genus: Hewitsonia
- Species: H. danane

Binomial name
- Hewitsonia danane Stempffer, 1969

Synonyms
- Hewitsonia dennisangwina d'Abrera, 1980

Species of butterfly

Hewitsonia danane, the Stempffer's tiger blue, is a butterfly in the family Lycaenidae. It is found in western Ivory Coast, southern Nigeria and central and western Cameroon.

The larvae feed on blue-green algae (cyanobacteria). They are associated with the ant species Oecophylla longinoda.
