= Hewitsonia bitjeana =

Scientific classification
- Domain: Eukaryota
- Kingdom: Animalia
- Phylum: Arthropoda
- Class: Insecta
- Order: Lepidoptera
- Family: Lycaenidae
- Genus: Hewitsonia
- Species: H. bitjeana

Binomial name
- Hewitsonia bitjeana Bethune-Baker, 1915

Species of butterfly

Hewitsonia bitjeana is a butterfly in the family Lycaenidae. It is found in south-eastern Nigeria, southern Cameroon and possibly Gabon and the Republic of the Congo.
