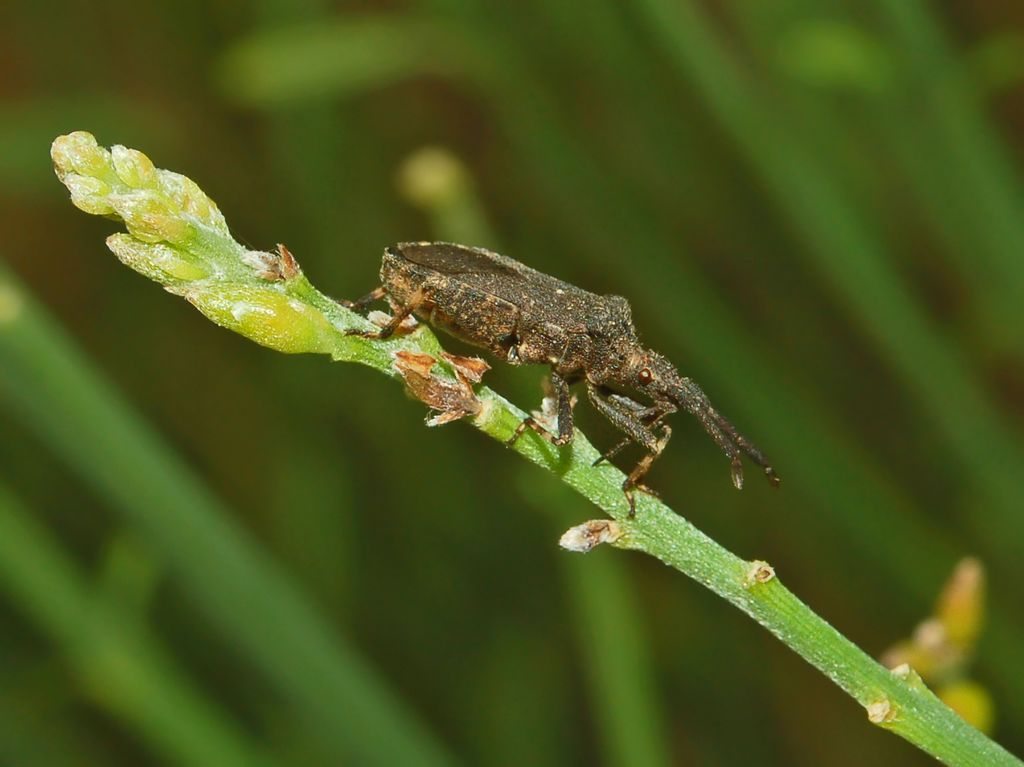
- Bothrostethus annulipes

Scientific classification
- Kingdom: Animalia
- Phylum: Arthropoda
- Class: Insecta
- Order: Hemiptera
- Suborder: Heteroptera
- Family: Coreidae
- Subfamily: Pseudophloeinae
- Genus: Bothrostethus; Fieber 1860

= Bothrostethus =

Genus of true bugs

Bothrostethus is a genus of family Coreidae, subfamily Pseudophloeinae.

== Species ==
- Bothrostethus annulipes (A. Costa, 1847)
