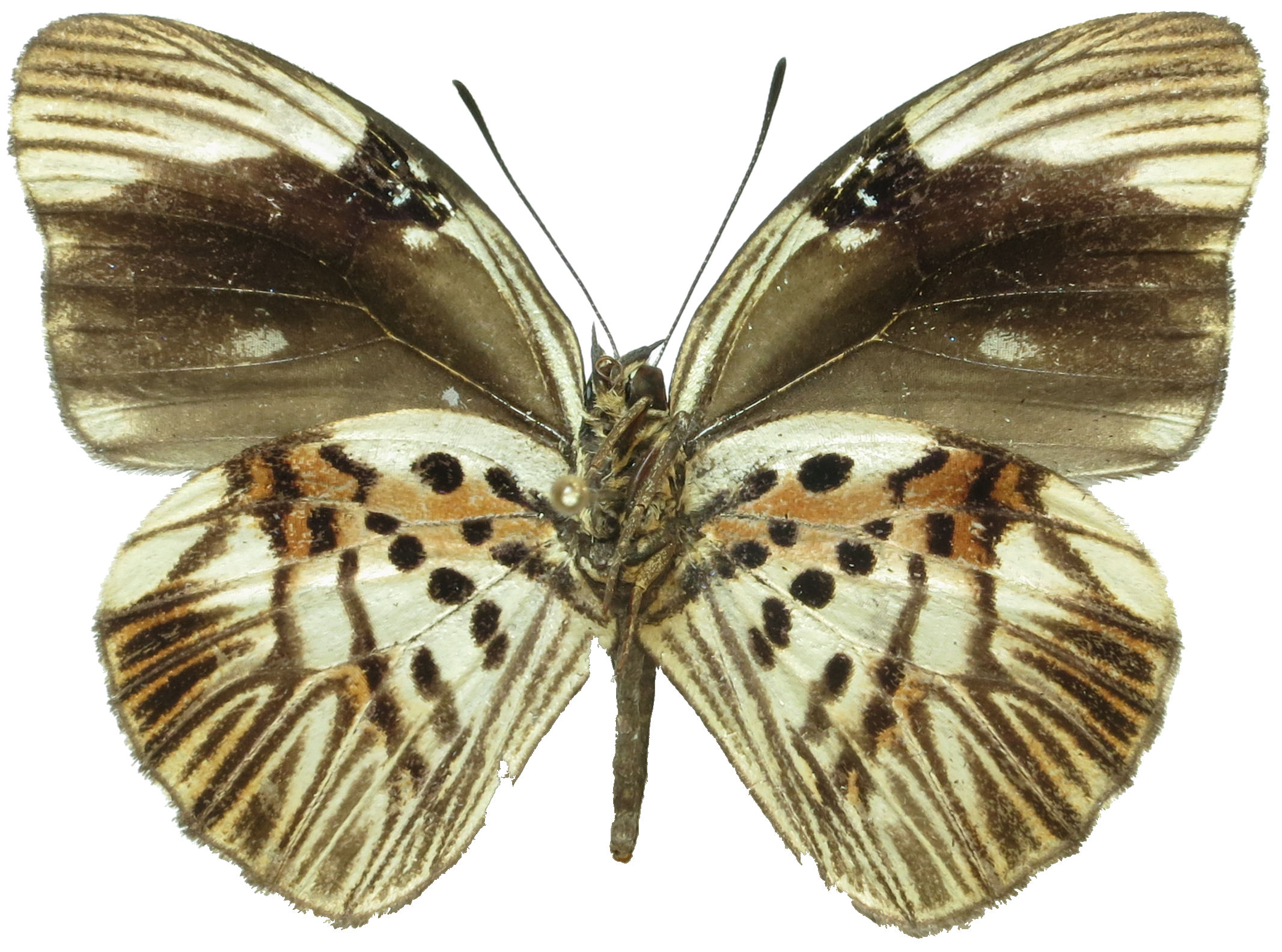
- Hewitsonia inexpectata - Centre Region (Cameroon)

Scientific classification
- Kingdom: Animalia
- Phylum: Arthropoda
- Clade: Pancrustacea
- Class: Insecta
- Order: Lepidoptera
- Family: Lycaenidae
- Genus: Hewitsonia
- Species: H. inexpectata

Binomial name
- Hewitsonia inexpectata Bouyer, 1997

= Hewitsonia inexpectata =

Species of butterfly

Hewitsonia inexpectata, the unexpected tiger blue, is a butterfly in the family Lycaenidae. It is found in Sierra Leone, Liberia, Ivory Coast, Ghana, Togo, Nigeria, Cameroon, the Republic of the Congo, the Central African Republic, the Democratic Republic of the Congo, Uganda, western Kenya and north-western Tanzania. The habitat consists of forests.

Torben Larsen developed a species numbering system for his 2005 publication Butterflies of West Africa. This species is #286. The 'Larsen' numbers have since been used with permission in A Sharp Eye on Butterflies of Ghana.
