= Pseudotheraptus =

Scientific classification
- Kingdom: Animalia
- Phylum: Arthropoda
- Class: Insecta
- Order: Hemiptera
- Suborder: Heteroptera
- Family: Coreidae
- Tribe: Gonocerini
- Genus: Pseudotheraptus; Brown, 1955

Genus of insects

Pseudotheraptus is a genus of true bugs belonging to the family Coreidae.

The species of this genus are found in Africa.

Species:

- Pseudotheraptus devastans (Distant, 1917)
- Pseudotheraptus ugandae Brown, 1955
- Pseudotheraptus wayi Brown, 1955
