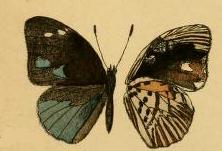

Scientific classification
- Domain: Eukaryota
- Kingdom: Animalia
- Phylum: Arthropoda
- Class: Insecta
- Order: Lepidoptera
- Family: Lycaenidae
- Genus: Hewitsonia
- Species: H. kirbyi

Binomial name
- Hewitsonia kirbyi Dewitz, 1879

Synonyms
- Hewitsonia preussi Staudinger, 1891; Hewitsonia gomensis Dufrane, 1953; Hewitsonia kirbyi sankuru Berger, 1981

= Hewitsonia kirbyi =

Species of butterfly

Hewitsonia kirbyi, the Kirby's tiger blue, is a butterfly in the family Lycaenidae. It is found in Nigeria, Cameroon, Gabon, the Republic of the Congo, Angola, the Democratic Republic of the Congo and Zambia. The habitat consists of forests.

The larvae feed on lichen on the bark of trees.

== Subspecies ==
- Hewitsonia kirbyi kirbyi (Nigeria: south and the Cross River loop, Cameroon, Gabon, Congo, Angola, Democratic Republic of the Congo: east of Lualaba, Zambia)
- Hewitsonia kirbyi preussi Staudinger, 1891 (eastern Democratic Republic of the Congo)

== Etymology ==
The name honours two entomologists William Chapman Hewitson and William Forsell Kirby.
