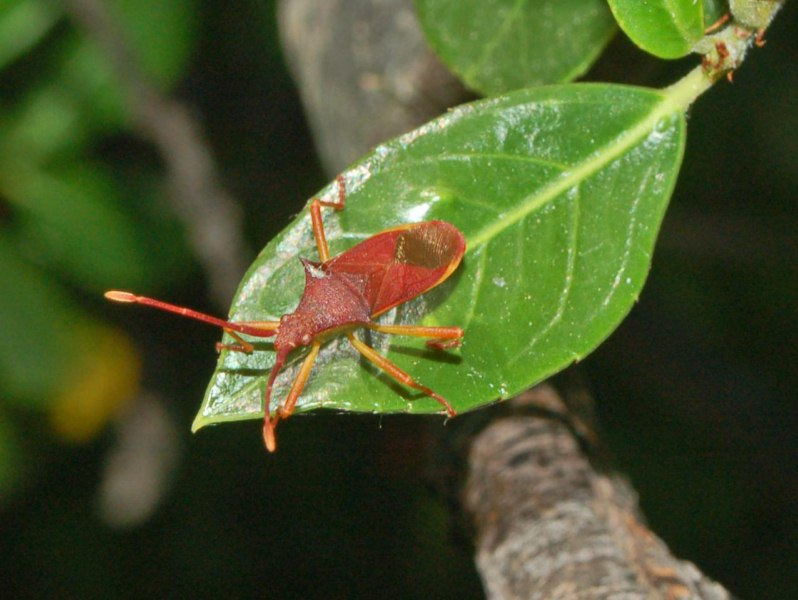
- Gonocerus insidiator

Scientific classification
- Domain: Eukaryota
- Kingdom: Animalia
- Phylum: Arthropoda
- Class: Insecta
- Order: Hemiptera
- Suborder: Heteroptera
- Family: Coreidae
- Tribe: Gonocerini
- Genus: Gonocerus; Berthold, 1827

= Gonocerus =

Genus of true bugs

Gonocerus is a genus of squash bugs belonging to the family Coreidae.

== Species ==
- Gonocerus acuteangulatus (Goeze, 1778)
- Gonocerus insidiator (Fabricius, 1787)
- Gonocerus juniperi Herrich-Schäffer, 1839
- Gonocerus lictor Horváth, 1879
- Gonocerus longicornis Hsiao, 1964
- Gonocerus lux Van Reenen, 1981
- Gonocerus nigrovittatus Ren, 1984
- Gonocerus rex Van Reenen, 1981
- Gonocerus schoutedeni Van Reenen, 1981
- Gonocerus yunnanensis Hsiao, 1964
