= Gonocerus juniperi =

- Gonocerus juniperi on Juniperus oxycedrus, Lambesc, France

Scientific classification
- Kingdom: Animalia
- Phylum: Arthropoda
- Clade: Pancrustacea
- Class: Insecta
- Order: Hemiptera
- Suborder: Heteroptera
- Family: Coreidae
- Genus: Gonocerus
- Species: G. juniperi

Binomial name
- Gonocerus juniperi Herrich-Schaeffer, 1839

Species of true bug

Gonocerus juniperi (juniper bug) is a species of bug belonging to the family Coreidae, native to most of mainland Europe east to Ukraine, but not in the Baltic States or Scandinavia; elsewhere, it also occurs on the Canary Islands, the Balearic Islands, and on Cyprus.

== Behaviour ==
Both the adults and larvae feed on the foliage of juniper and other related conifers in the family Cupressaceae, and more rarely on yew, pine, spruce and box.
