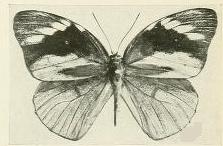

Scientific classification
- Domain: Eukaryota
- Kingdom: Animalia
- Phylum: Arthropoda
- Class: Insecta
- Order: Lepidoptera
- Family: Lycaenidae
- Genus: Hewitsonia
- Species: H. congoensis

Binomial name
- Hewitsonia congoensis Joicey & Talbot, 1921

Synonyms
- Hewitsonia boisduvalii congoensis Joicey & Talbot, 1921; Hewitsonia boisduvalii ab. virilis Aurivillius, 1923; Hewitsoniia boisduvalii ab. albifascia Hulstaert, 1924

= Hewitsonia congoensis =

Species of butterfly

Hewitsonia congoensis is a butterfly in the family Lycaenidae. It is found in Cameroon and the Democratic Republic of the Congo (Mongala, Uele, Ituri, North Kivu, Tshopo, Tshuapa, Equateur, Mai-Ndombe, Kwango, Sankuru, Maniema and Lualaba).
