= Hewitsonia intermedia =

Scientific classification
- Domain: Eukaryota
- Kingdom: Animalia
- Phylum: Arthropoda
- Class: Insecta
- Order: Lepidoptera
- Family: Lycaenidae
- Genus: Hewitsonia
- Species: H. intermedia

Binomial name
- Hewitsonia intermedia Jackson, 1962

Synonyms
- Hewitsonia kirbyi f. intermedia Joicey and Talbot, 1921

Species of butterfly

Hewitsonia intermedia is a butterfly in the family Lycaenidae. It is found in the Democratic Republic of the Congo, Uganda and north-western Tanzania. The habitat consists of forests.

The larvae feed on lichen on the trunks of trees.
