= Hewitsonia amieti =

Scientific classification
- Kingdom: Animalia
- Phylum: Arthropoda
- Class: Insecta
- Order: Lepidoptera
- Family: Lycaenidae
- Genus: Hewitsonia
- Species: H. amieti

Binomial name
- Hewitsonia amieti Bouyer, 1997

Species of butterfly

Hewitsonia amieti is a butterfly in the family Lycaenidae. It is found in Cameroon.
