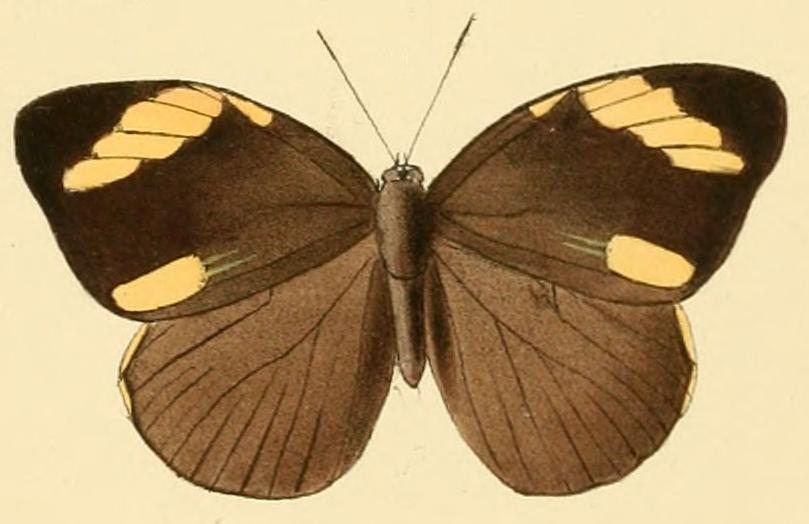

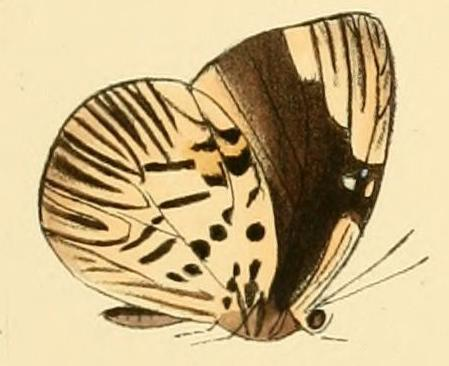

Scientific classification
- Kingdom: Animalia
- Phylum: Arthropoda
- Clade: Pancrustacea
- Class: Insecta
- Order: Lepidoptera
- Family: Lycaenidae
- Genus: Hewitsonia
- Species: H. boisduvalii

Binomial name
- Hewitsonia boisduvalii (Hewitson, 1869)

Synonyms
- Corydon boisduvalii Hewitson, 1869; Hewitsonia boiduvalii nigeriensis Jackson, 1962

= Hewitsonia boisduvalii =

Species of butterfly

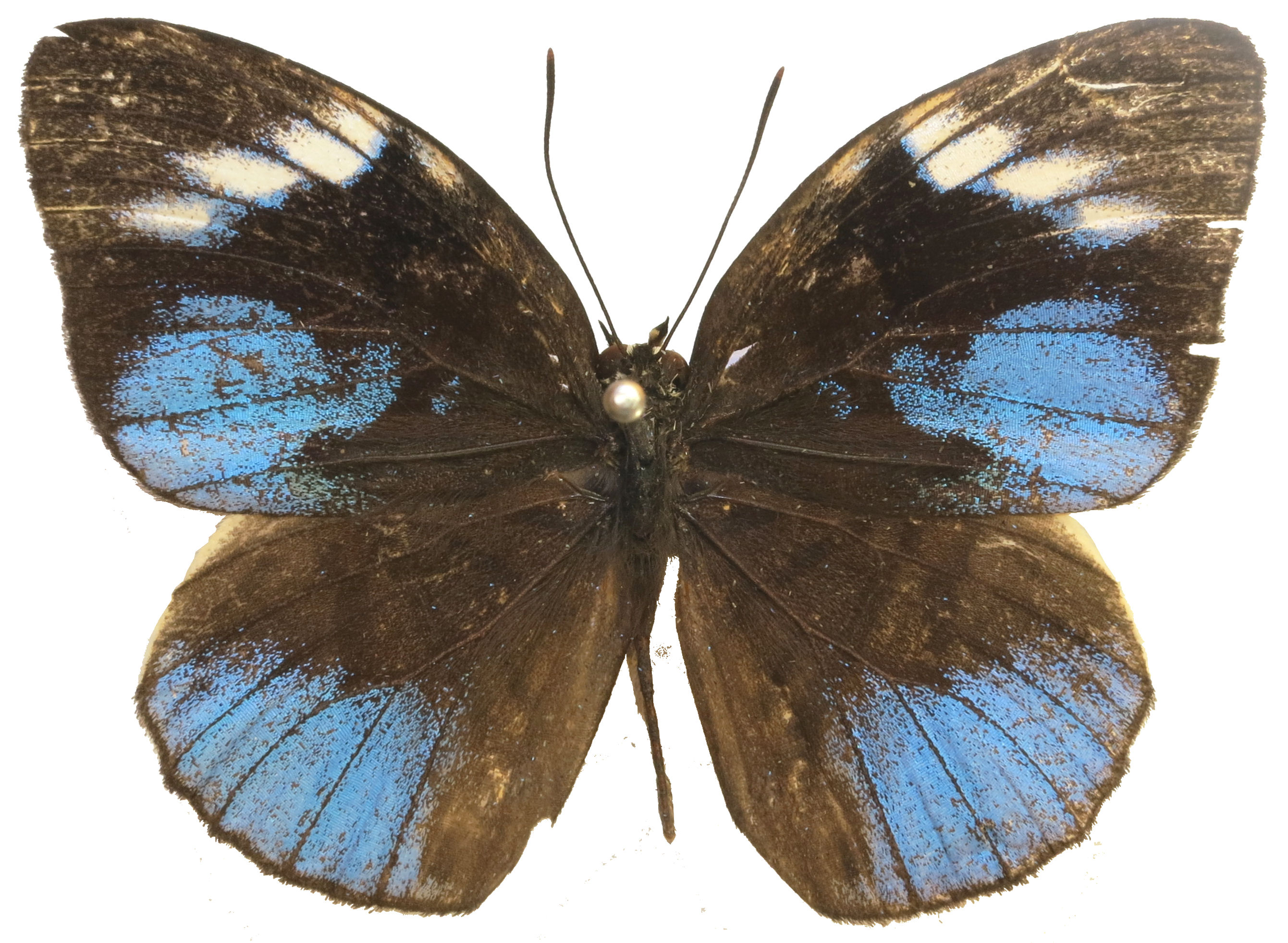
Hewitsonia boisduvalii - Volta Region, Ghana

Hewitsonia boisduvalii, the large tiger blue, is a butterfly in the family Lycaenidae. It is found in Guinea, Liberia, Ivory Coast, Ghana, Nigeria (south and the Cross River loop), Cameroon, Gabon, the Republic of the Congo and the Central African Republic. The habitat consists of primary and secondary forests with a closed canopy.

== Subspecies ==
- Hewitsonia boisduvalii boisduvalii (Guinea: Nimba Mountains, Liberia, Ivory Coast, Ghana, Nigeria, Cameroon, Gabon, Congo, Central African Republic)
- Hewitsonia boisduvalii borealis Schultze, 1916 (southern Nigeria, Cameroon)

Torben Larsen developed a species numbering system for his 2005 publication Butterflies of West Africa. The nominate subspecies is #283. The 'Larsen' numbers have since been used with permission in A Sharp Eye on Butterflies of Ghana.
