= Hewitsonia occidentalis =

Scientific classification
- Kingdom: Animalia
- Phylum: Arthropoda
- Clade: Pancrustacea
- Class: Insecta
- Order: Lepidoptera
- Family: Lycaenidae
- Genus: Hewitsonia
- Species: H. occidentalis

Binomial name
- Hewitsonia occidentalis Bouyer, 1997

Species of butterfly

Hewitsonia occidentalis, the western tiger blue, is a butterfly in the family Lycaenidae. It is found in Guinea, Ivory Coast, Ghana and western Nigeria. The habitat consists of forests.

Torben Larsen developed a species numbering system for his 2005 publication Butterflies of West Africa. This species is #284. The 'Larsen' numbers have since been used with permission in A Sharp Eye on Butterflies of Ghana.
