= Hewitsonia magdalenae =

Scientific classification
- Kingdom: Animalia
- Phylum: Arthropoda
- Class: Insecta
- Order: Lepidoptera
- Family: Lycaenidae
- Genus: Hewitsonia
- Species: H. magdalenae

Binomial name
- Hewitsonia magdalenae Stempffer, 1951

Species of butterfly

Hewitsonia magdalenae is a butterfly in the family Lycaenidae. It is found in the Democratic Republic of the Congo (Uele and Equateur).
