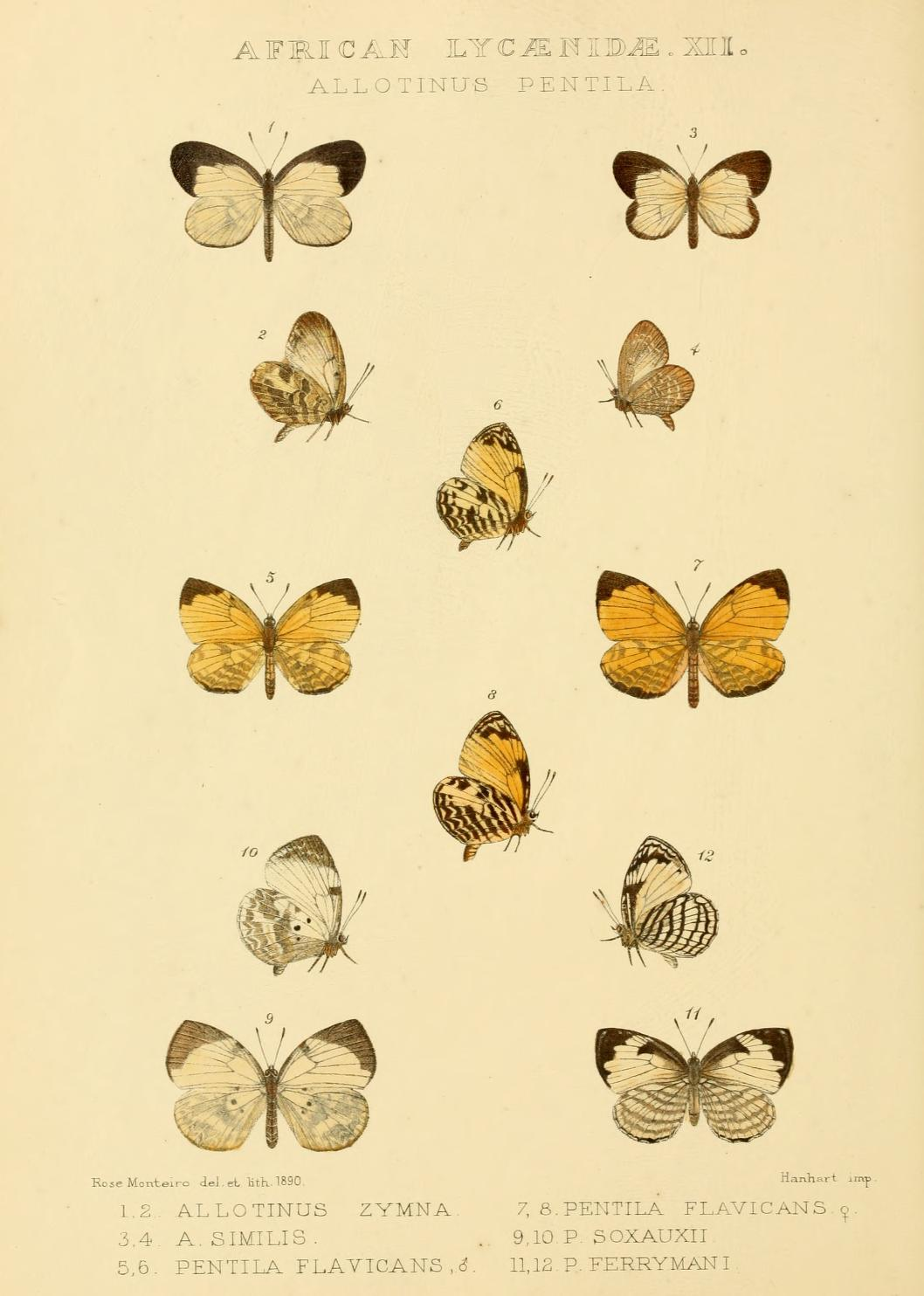

Scientific classification
- Domain: Eukaryota
- Kingdom: Animalia
- Phylum: Arthropoda
- Class: Insecta
- Order: Lepidoptera
- Family: Lycaenidae
- Genus: Hewitsonia
- Species: H. similis

Binomial name
- Hewitsonia similis (Aurivillius, 1891)

Synonyms
- Allotinus similis Aurivillius, 1891

= Hewitsonia similis =

Species of butterfly

Hewitsonia similis is a butterfly in the family Lycaenidae. It is found in Gabon and the Republic of the Congo.
