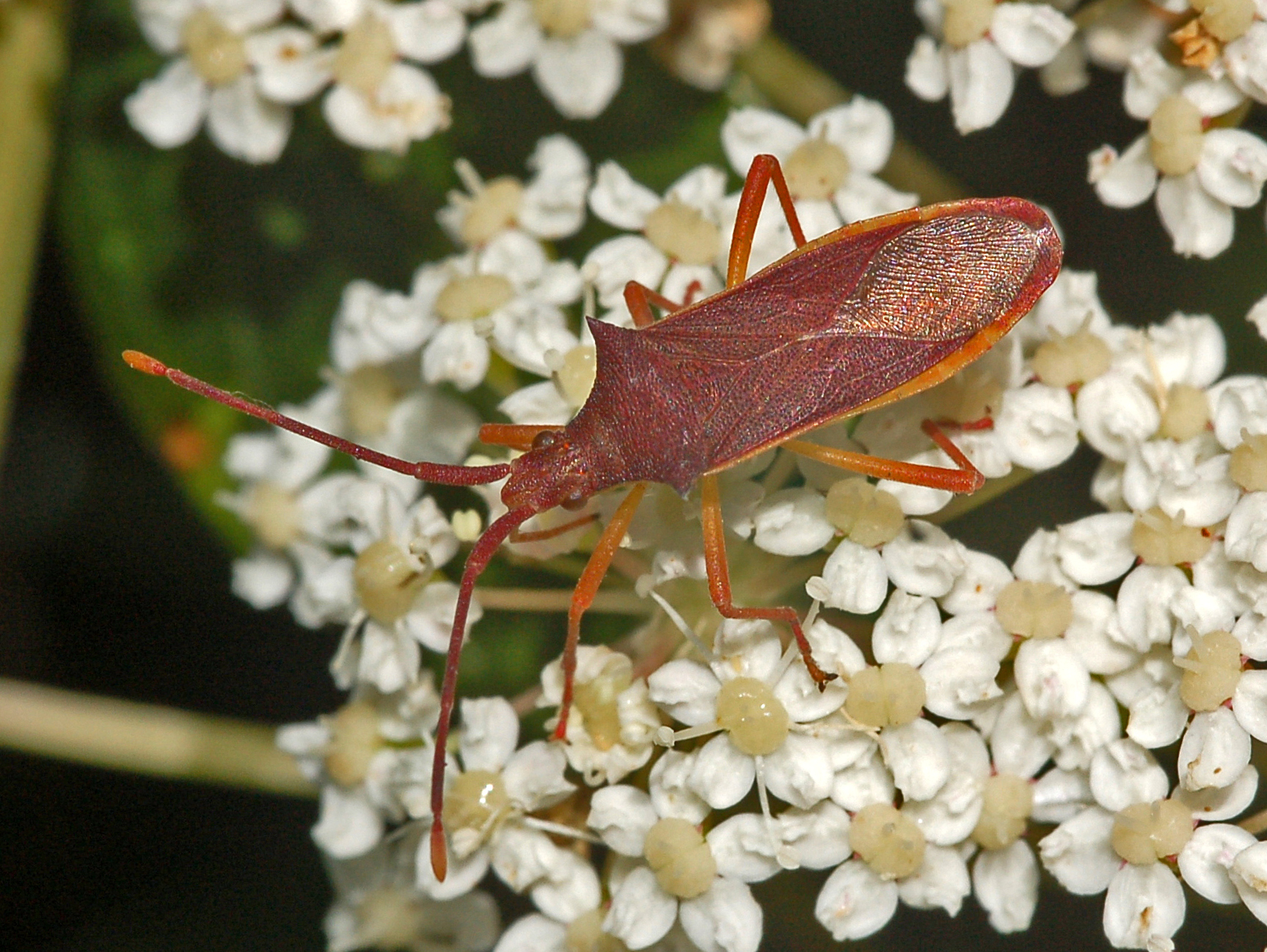
- Dorsal view
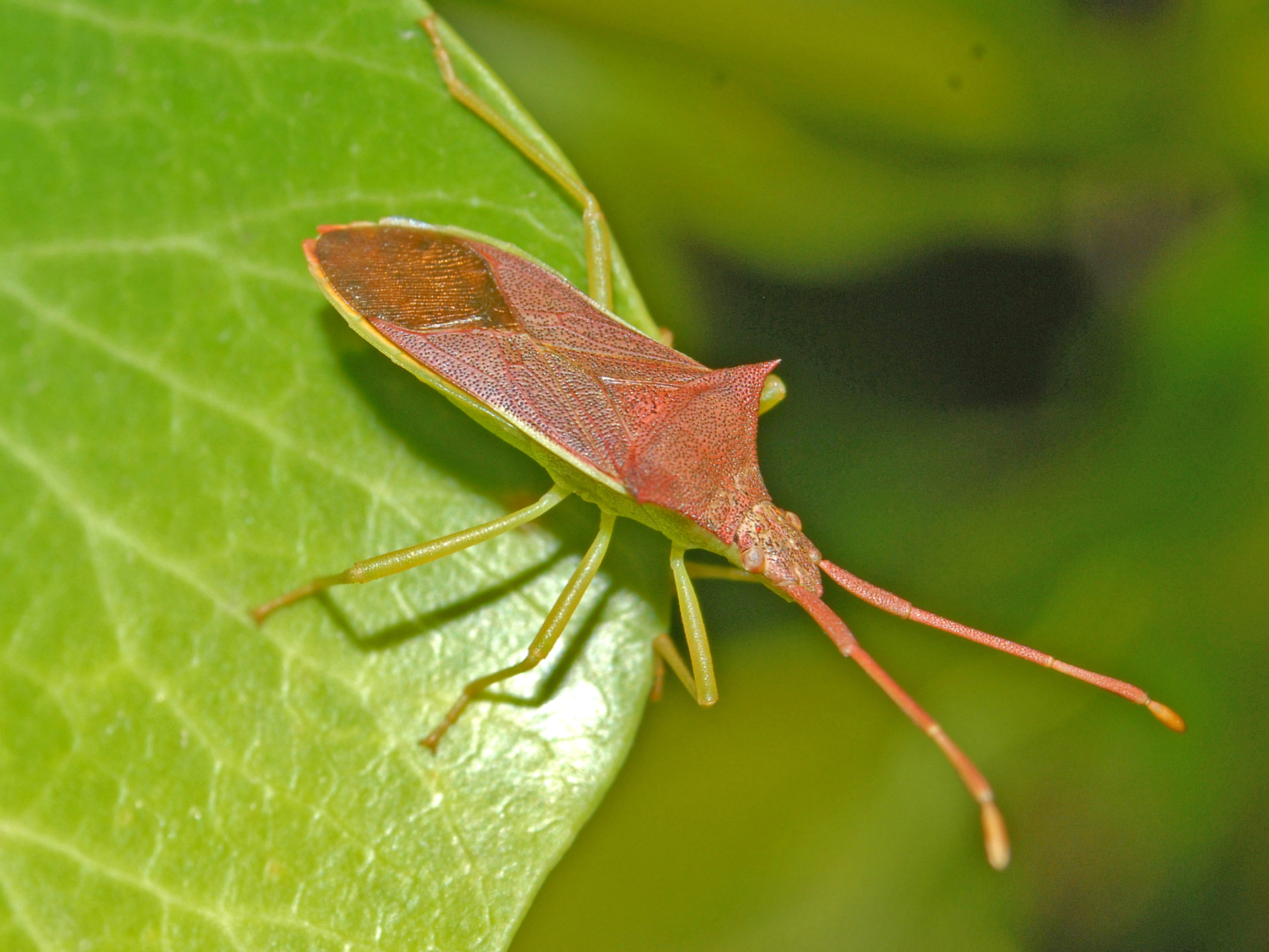
- Side view

Scientific classification
- Kingdom: Animalia
- Phylum: Arthropoda
- Class: Insecta
- Order: Hemiptera
- Suborder: Heteroptera
- Family: Coreidae
- Genus: Gonocerus
- Species: G. insidiator

Binomial name
- Gonocerus insidiator (Fabricius, 1787)

= Gonocerus insidiator =

Species of true bug

Gonocerus insidiator is a species of squash bugs belonging to the family Coreidae.

== Distribution and habitat ==
This holomediterranean species is mainly found in France, Italy, Greece, Portugal, Spain and former Jugoslavia. These squash bugs prefer riverine woods.

== Description ==
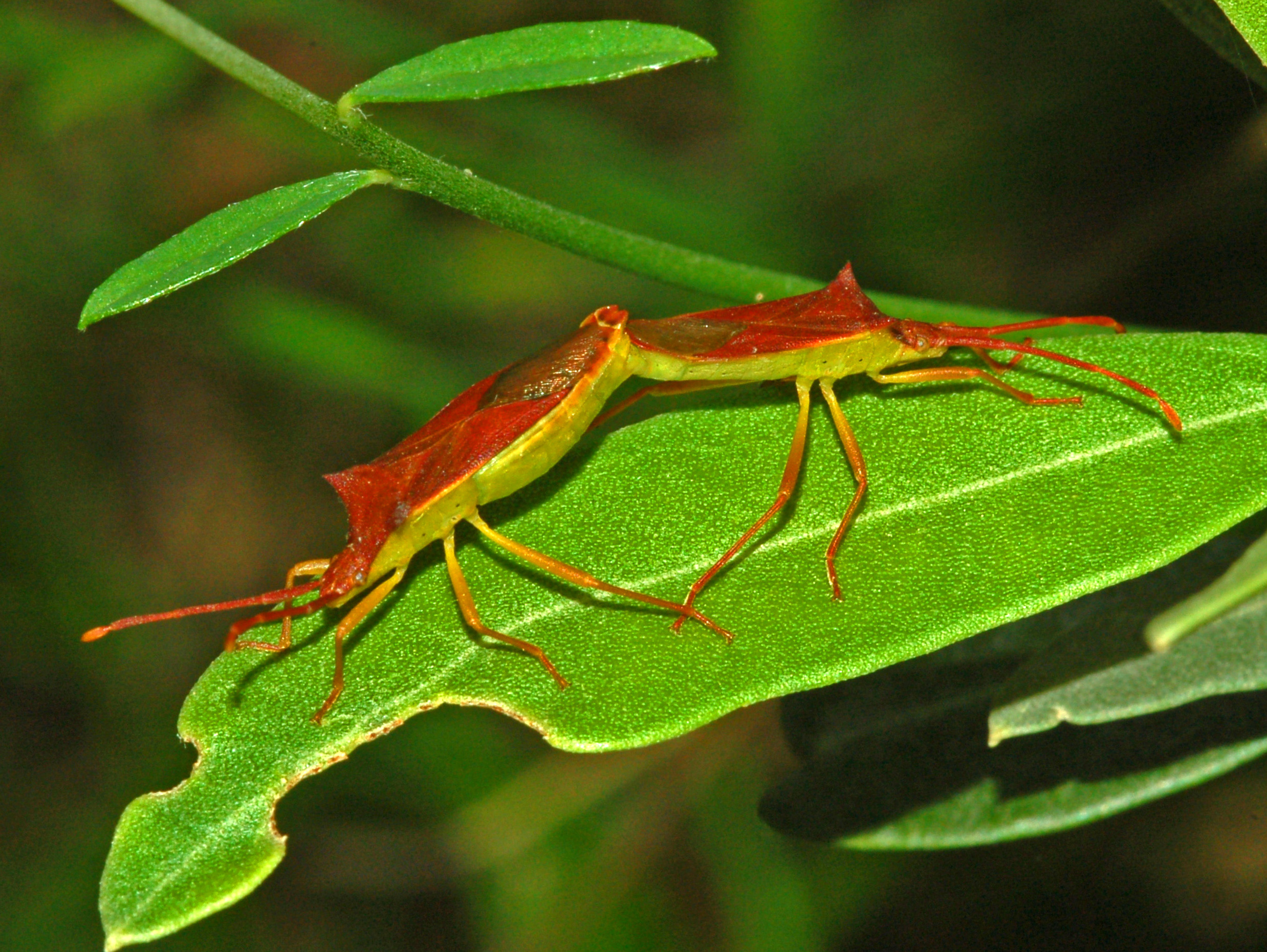
Mating pair of Gonocerus insidiator

Gonocerus insidiator can reach a body length of 10–15 millimetres (0.39–0.59 in). These squash bugs have greenish protruding eyes and long reddish brown antennae composed with four segments. The pronotum is broad and bears two long sharp spikes. The basic color or the body is reddish brown, with a yellowish-green ventral side. The color of the legs may be yellowish-green or reddish-yellow.

The head is shorter than the pronotum. Corium shows small spots, but without extensive stains. Pronotum, at the humeral corners, is wider than the abdomen, including connexivi. Head is without black bands between the antennas and the rear edge.

This species can be distinguished from Gonocerus acuteangulatus by the wider pronotum.

== Biology ==
Gonocerus insidiator feed on sap from various host plants and fruits, especially on Pistacia lentiscus, Arbutus unedo and Cistus species. They overwinter in the adult stage.
