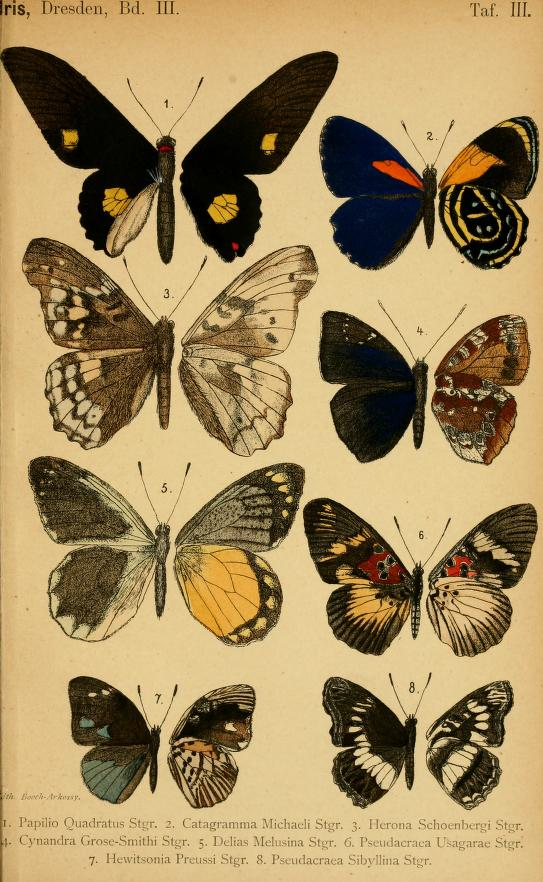
- Hewitsonia kirbyi figure 7

Scientific classification
- Domain: Eukaryota
- Kingdom: Animalia
- Phylum: Arthropoda
- Class: Insecta
- Order: Lepidoptera
- Family: Lycaenidae
- Subfamily: Poritiinae
- Tribe: Liptenini
- Genus: Hewitsonia; Kirby, 1871

Synonyms
- Corydon Hewitson, 1869 (preocc. Lesson, 1828, Wagler, [1832], Gloger, 1841)

= Hewitsonia =

Butterfly genus in family Lycaenidae

Hewitsonia is a genus of butterflies in the family Lycaenidae. The species of this genus are endemic to the Afrotropical realm.

== Species ==
- Hewitsonia amieti Bouyer, 1997
- Hewitsonia beryllina Schultze, 1916
- Hewitsonia bitjeana Bethune-Baker, 1915
- Hewitsonia boisduvalii (Hewitson, 1869)
- Hewitsonia congoensis Joicey & Talbot, 1921
- Hewitsonia danane Stempffer, 1969
- Hewitsonia inexpectata Bouyer, 1997
- Hewitsonia intermedia Jackson, 1962
- Hewitsonia kirbyi Dewitz, 1879
- Hewitsonia kuehnei Collins & Larsen, 2008
- Hewitsonia magdalenae Stempffer, 1951
- Hewitsonia occidentalis Bouyer, 1997
- Hewitsonia prouvosti Bouyer, 1997
- Hewitsonia similis (Aurivillius, 1891)
- Hewitsonia ugandae Jackson, 1962
