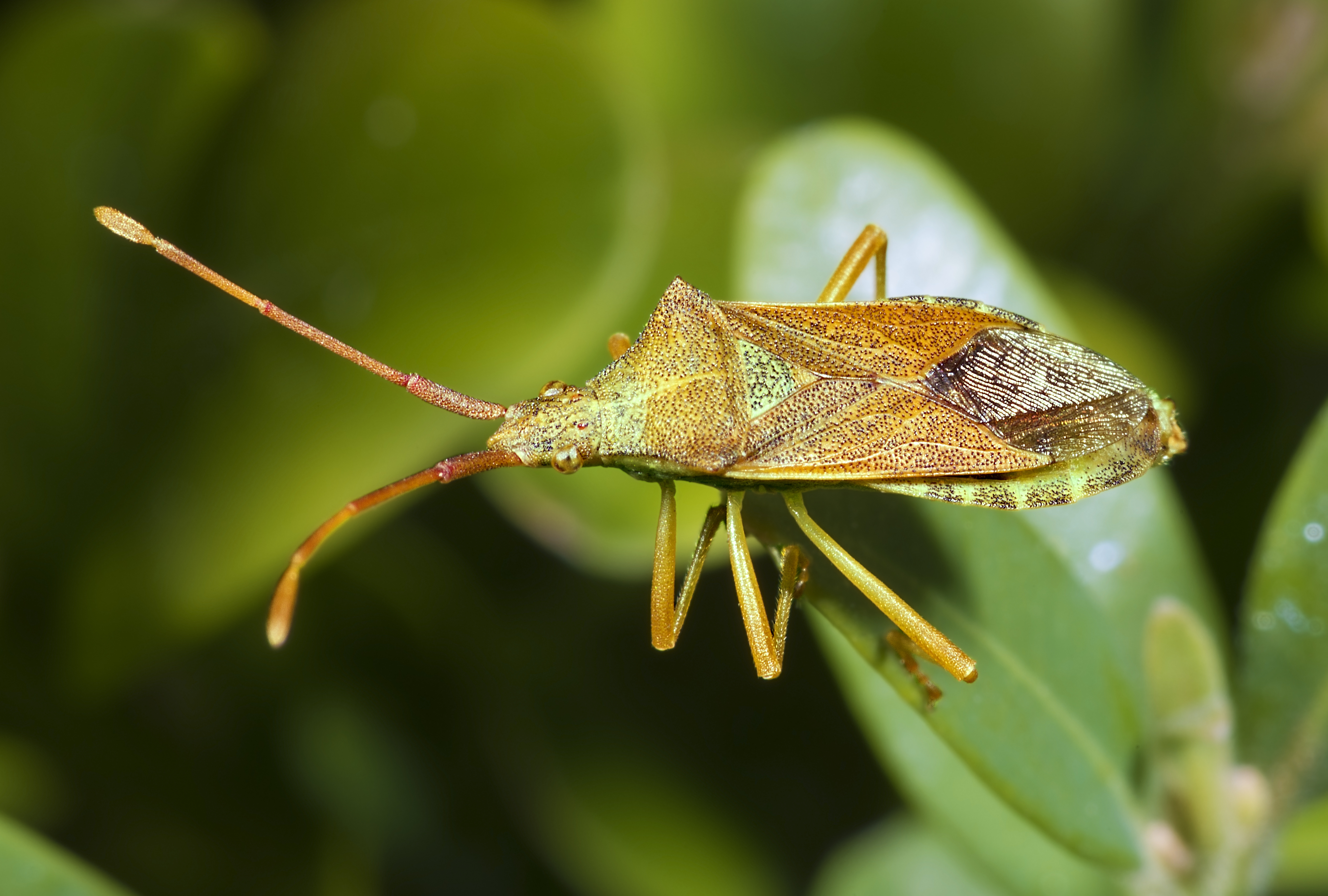
- Gonocerus acuteangulatus

Scientific classification
- Domain: Eukaryota
- Kingdom: Animalia
- Phylum: Arthropoda
- Class: Insecta
- Order: Hemiptera
- Suborder: Heteroptera
- Family: Coreidae
- Subfamily: Coreinae
- Tribe: Gonocerini (Mulsant & Rey, 1870)?

Synonyms
- Gonoceraria, Gonocerina; Gonocérates Mulsant & Rey, 1870

= Gonocerini =

Tribe of true bugs

The Gonocerini, synonym Gonocérates are a tribe of leaf-footed bugs, in the subfamily Coreinae. The type genus is Gonocerus Berthold, 1827; genera are distributed from Africa, Europe to South-East Asia and Australia.

== Genera ==
The Coreoidea Species File lists:

1. Brotheolus Bergroth, 1908
2. Brunsellius Distant, 1902
3. Cletoliturus Brailovsky, 2011
4. Cletomorpha Mayr, 1866
5. Cletoscellus Brailovsky, 2011
6. Cletus Stål, 1860
7. Gonocerus Berthold, 1827
8. Junodis Van Reenen, 1976
9. Plinachtus Stål, 1860
10. Pseudotheraptus Brown, 1955
11. Trallianus Distant, 1902
