= Hewitsonia kuehnei =

Scientific classification
- Domain: Eukaryota
- Kingdom: Animalia
- Phylum: Arthropoda
- Class: Insecta
- Order: Lepidoptera
- Family: Lycaenidae
- Genus: Hewitsonia
- Species: H. kuehnei

Binomial name
- Hewitsonia kuehnei Collins & Larsen, 2008

Species of butterfly

Hewitsonia kuehnei is a butterfly in the family Lycaenidae. It is found in Kenya, Tanzania and Uganda.
