= Hewitsonia ugandae =

Scientific classification
- Domain: Eukaryota
- Kingdom: Animalia
- Phylum: Arthropoda
- Class: Insecta
- Order: Lepidoptera
- Family: Lycaenidae
- Genus: Hewitsonia
- Species: H. ugandae

Binomial name
- Hewitsonia ugandae Jackson, 1962

Synonyms
- Hewitsonia similis ugandae Jackson, 1962

Species of butterfly

Hewitsonia ugandae is a butterfly in the family Lycaenidae. It is found in Cameroon, Gabon, the Democratic Republic of the Congo (Uele, Tshopo and Tshuapa) and western Uganda.

== Subspecies ==
- Hewitsonia ugandae ugandae (Democratic Republic of the Congo (Uele, Tshopo, Tshuapa), western Uganda)
- Hewitsonia ugandae jolyana Bouyer, 1997 (Cameroon, Gabon)
