= Hewitsonia beryllina =

Scientific classification
- Domain: Eukaryota
- Kingdom: Animalia
- Phylum: Arthropoda
- Class: Insecta
- Order: Lepidoptera
- Family: Lycaenidae
- Genus: Hewitsonia
- Species: H. beryllina

Binomial name
- Hewitsonia beryllina Schultze, 1916

Species of butterfly

Hewitsonia beryllina, the green tiger blue, is a butterfly in the family Lycaenidae. It is found in Nigeria (the Cross River loop), western Cameroon and the Republic of the Congo. The habitat consists of forests.
