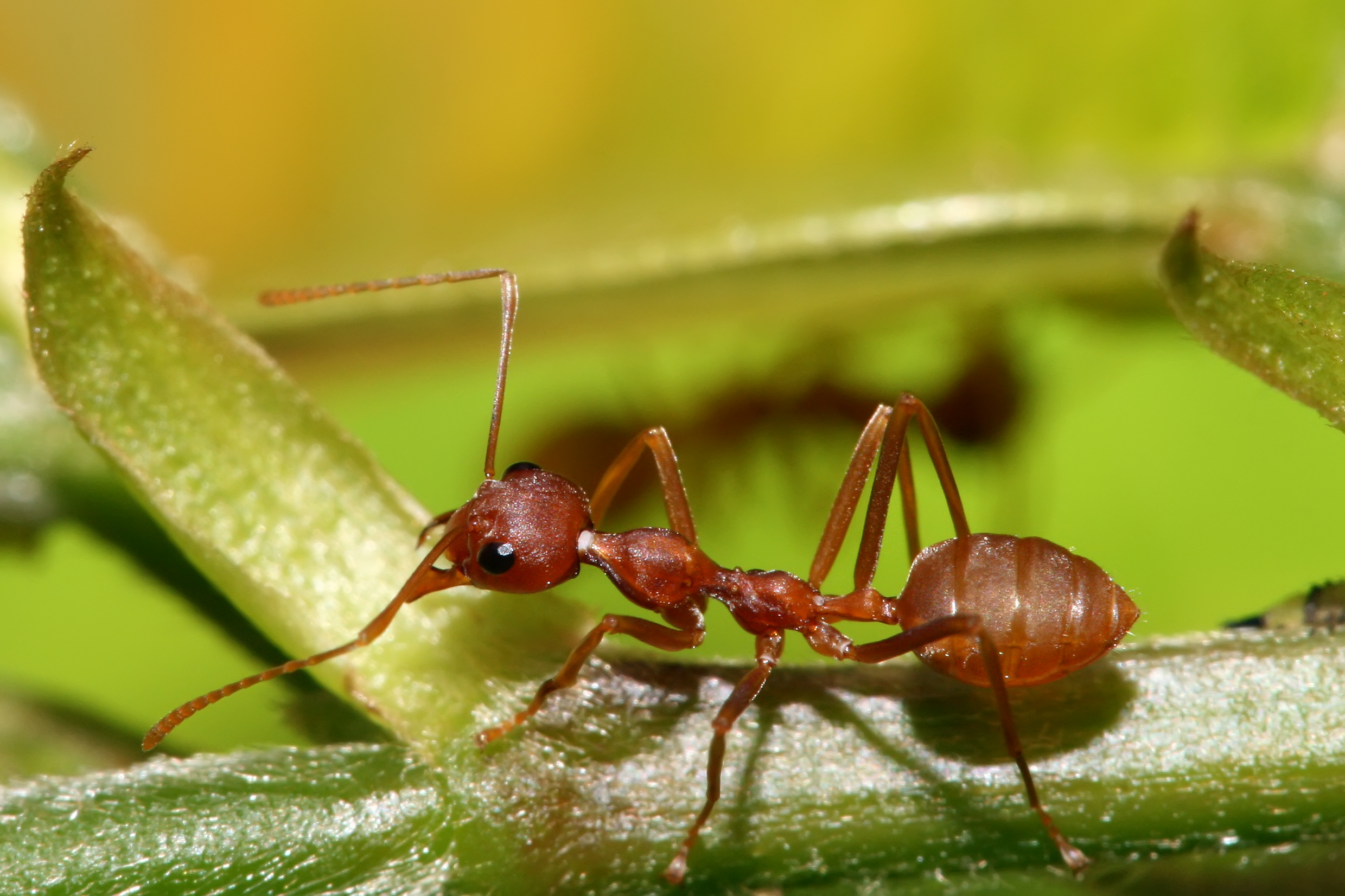
- In Morogoro, Tanzania

Scientific classification
- Kingdom: Animalia
- Phylum: Arthropoda
- Clade: Pancrustacea
- Class: Insecta
- Order: Hymenoptera
- Family: Formicidae
- Subfamily: Formicinae
- Genus: Oecophylla
- Species: O. longinoda

Binomial name
- Oecophylla longinoda Latreille, 1802
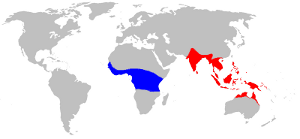
- Oecophylla range map. O. longinoda in blue, O. smaragdina in red.

= Oecophylla longinoda =

Species of ant

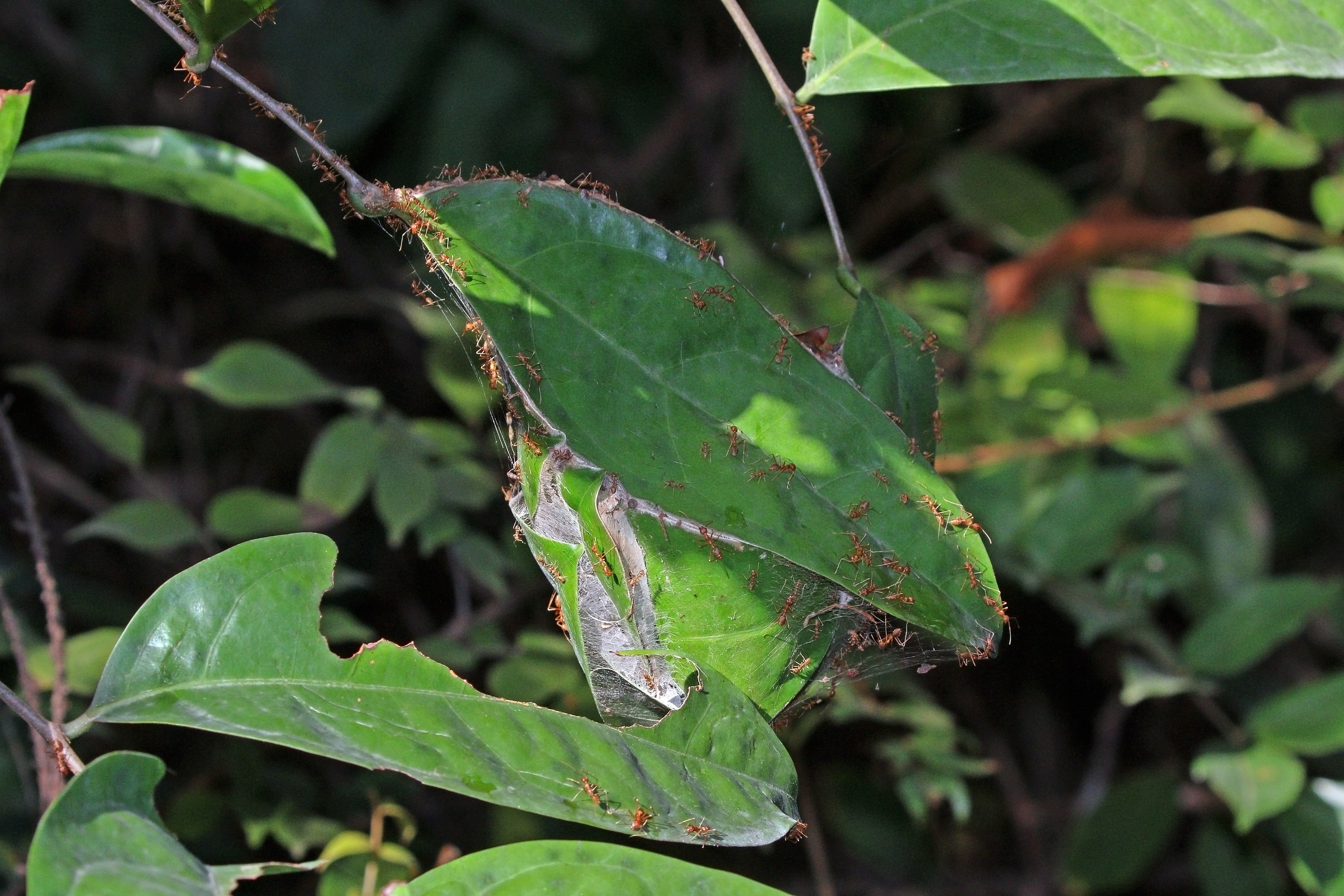
Nest in Ghana

Oecophylla longinoda (common name weaver ant) is a species of arboreal ant found in the forested regions of tropical Africa. They are one of only two extant species of the genus, the other being Oecophylla smaragdina. They make nests in trees made of leaves stitched together using the silk produced by their larvae.

== Description ==
The worker is a fairly large ant with a length of 6 mm (0.24 in). Their antennae have 12 segments, the first segment exceeding in length the second and third combined. The clypeus, at the front of the head, is large, convex, and hangs over the outer edge of the mouthparts. The large mandibles have long, triangular teeth, which cross over one another when the ant is at rest. This ant ranges in colour from orangeish-brown to dark brown; the thorax is clad in fine pubescence, while the abdomen is covered with short, erect hairs. The tip of the abdomen has glands that produce pheromones. The feet have suction pads, which enable these ants to cling to surfaces with a firm grip.

== Distribution and habitat ==
This weaver ant is widely distributed across the rainforests of sub-Saharan Africa. It is found high in the canopy and one colony can dominate the crown of one tree or spread across several trees.

== Life cycle ==
After her nuptial flight, a newly mated queen founds a colony in an out-of-the-way part of the canopy. At first, she guards the eggs and cares for the growing larvae herself, feeding them out of her bodily reserves, and not going out to forage. She may lose 60% of her body weight during this period. When grown, the larvae pupate, finally emerging as adult workers about 30 days after the eggs were laid. The workers then take over the building of nests and the care of the young, and the queen devotes herself to the laying of eggs, producing around 100 per day.

== Ecology ==
A weaver ant colony consists of a large number of nests between which ants move at will. The nests are made by binding leaves together using silk produced by the final-stage larvae. The queen inhabits one of these nests, while the others are used by the worker ants to live in and care for the brood. The ants occupy a three-dimensional territory in the treetops, driving off other ants of their own or other species aggressively, and usually creating a "no-ants-land", where the territory abuts on that of another colony. They are voracious predators, foraging on the ground, as well as in the trees for insects and other arthropods, and co-operating with each other to tackle large prey. They also feed on the honeydew produced by scale insects, and the ants maintain herds of scale insect for this purpose.

O. longinoda is a natural enemy of the coconut bug (Pseudotheraptus wayi), a pest that has caused up to 67% of the coconut crop in Tanzania to be lost. The weaver ant competes with other species of ants living among the coconut palms and is sometimes displaced by the ground-based Pheidole megacephala. However, the weaver ant is considerably more effective as a biological pest control agent, and baits are used to selectively control P. megacephala, allowing the weaver ants to flourish and control the coconut bugs.
