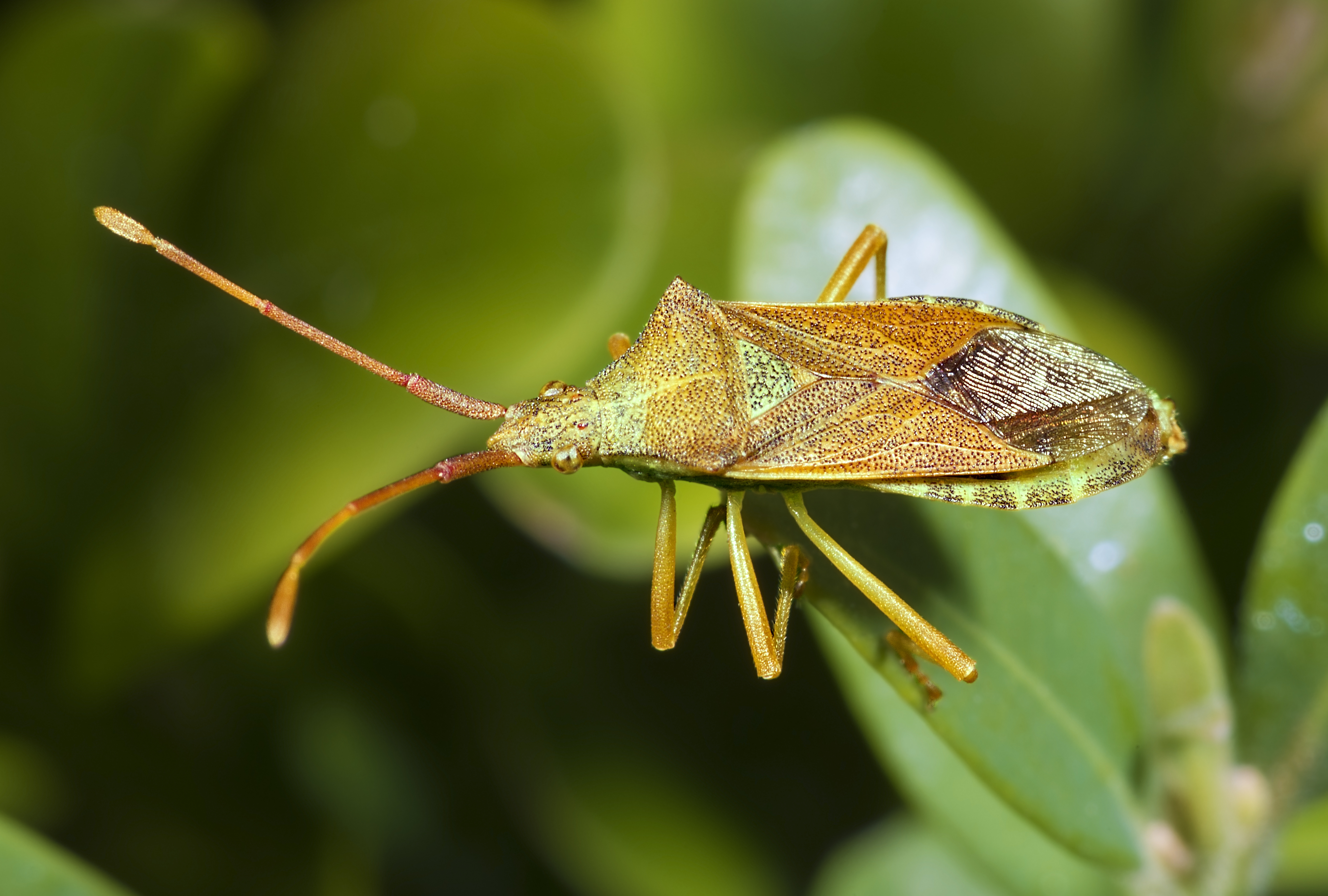
- An adult box bug

Scientific classification
- Kingdom: Animalia
- Phylum: Arthropoda
- Clade: Pancrustacea
- Class: Insecta
- Order: Hemiptera
- Suborder: Heteroptera
- Family: Coreidae
- Genus: Gonocerus
- Species: G. acuteangulatus

Binomial name
- Gonocerus acuteangulatus (Goeze, 1778)

= Gonocerus acuteangulatus =

Species of true bug

Gonocerus acuteangulatus is a herbivorous species of true bug in the family Coreidae. It is commonly known as the box bug in the UK as it once only occurred in Box Hill in Surrey where it fed on box trees.

== Taxonomy ==
This species was formally described by the German zoologist Johann Goeze in 1778, under the name Cimex acuteangulatus.

== Distribution ==
This species commonly occurs throughout the Mediterranean region and extends to Central Asia and parts of northwestern Europe.

== Habitat ==
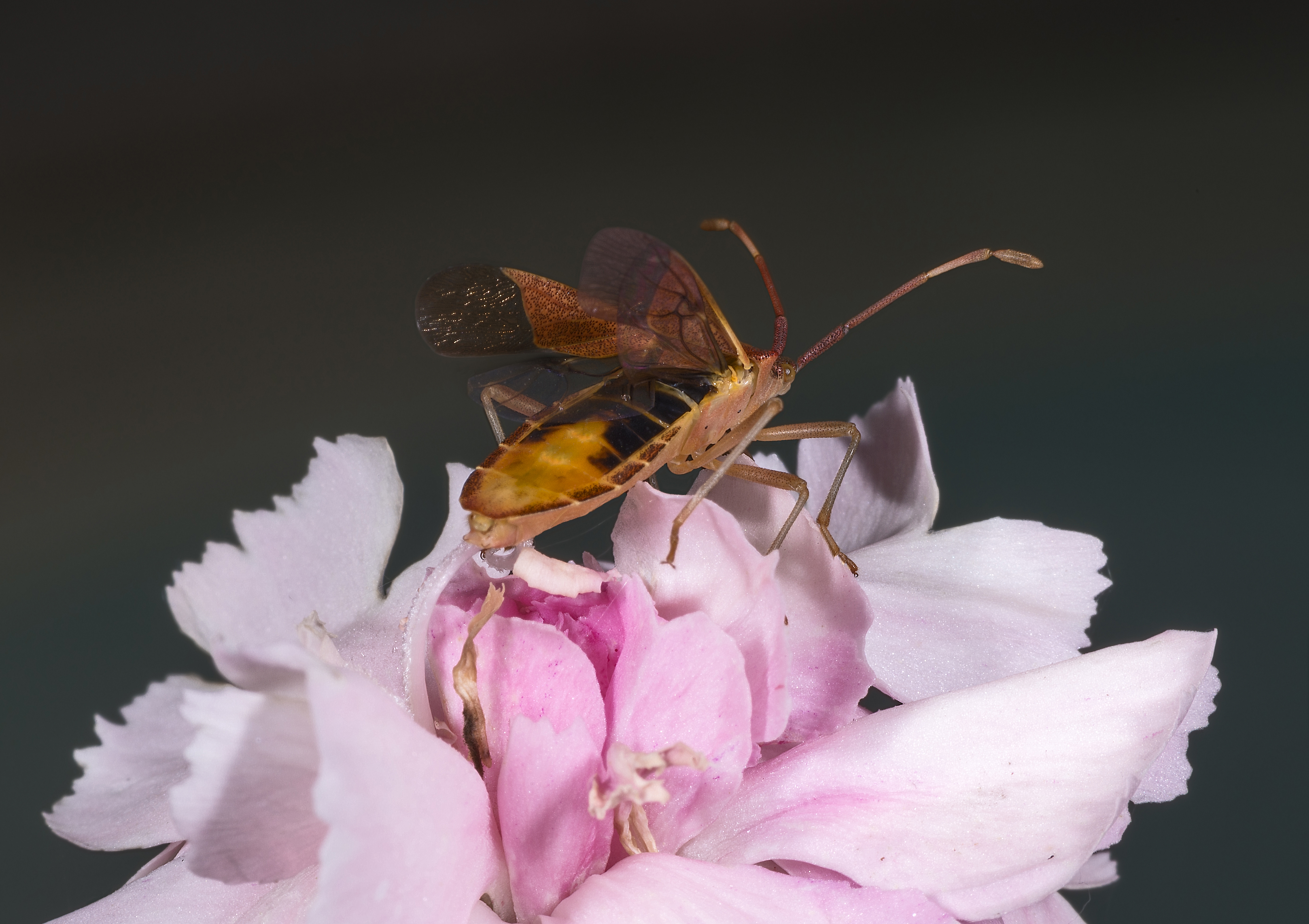
Takes off on eyelet.

These heat-loving bugs inhabit mainly dry and warm, south-exposed environments, bushes and forest edges with shrubs that bear berries and small trees of various families, especially Buxaceae and Rhamnaceae, as well as Rosa canina and Crataegus species (Rosaceae) or Lonicera xylosteum (Caprifoliaceae).

== Description ==
Gonocerus acuteangulatus is a medium-sized insect, between 11 and 14 mm long as an adult. These bugs are speckled reddish-brown with a slightly expanded abdomen. The nymphs have a green abdomen. This species is rather similar to Coreus marginatus, but it shows a narrower abdomen and has sharper lateral margins of the pronotum (hence the Latin species name acuteangulatus).

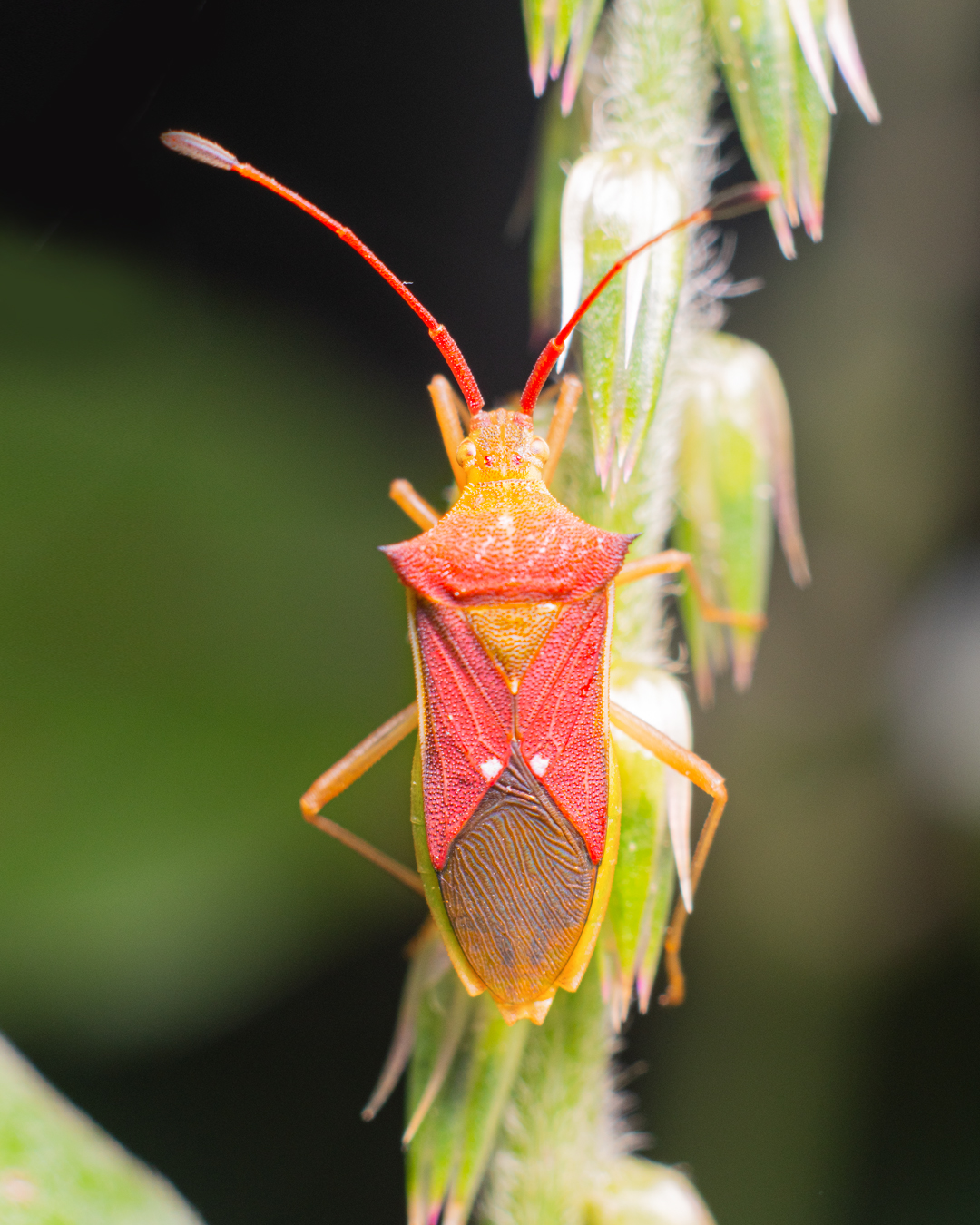
at Mumbai

== Biology ==
Adults can be found all year. They mainly feed on the juice of the ripe fruits of the host plants. This species is a harmful pest of the hazel and pistachio. It can also be a vector of the fungus Nematospora coryli, an agent of stigmatomycosis.

== Gallery ==
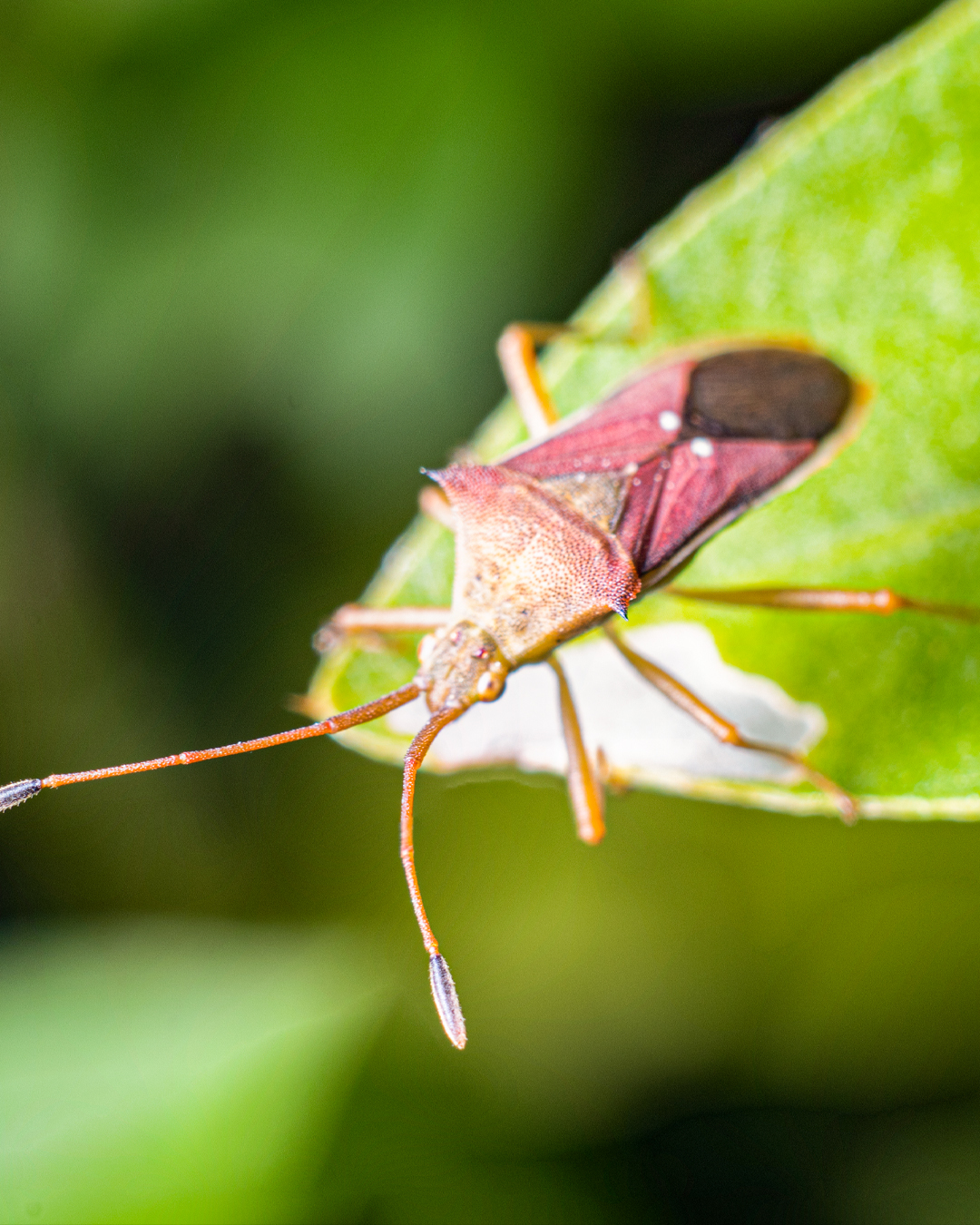
at Mumbai

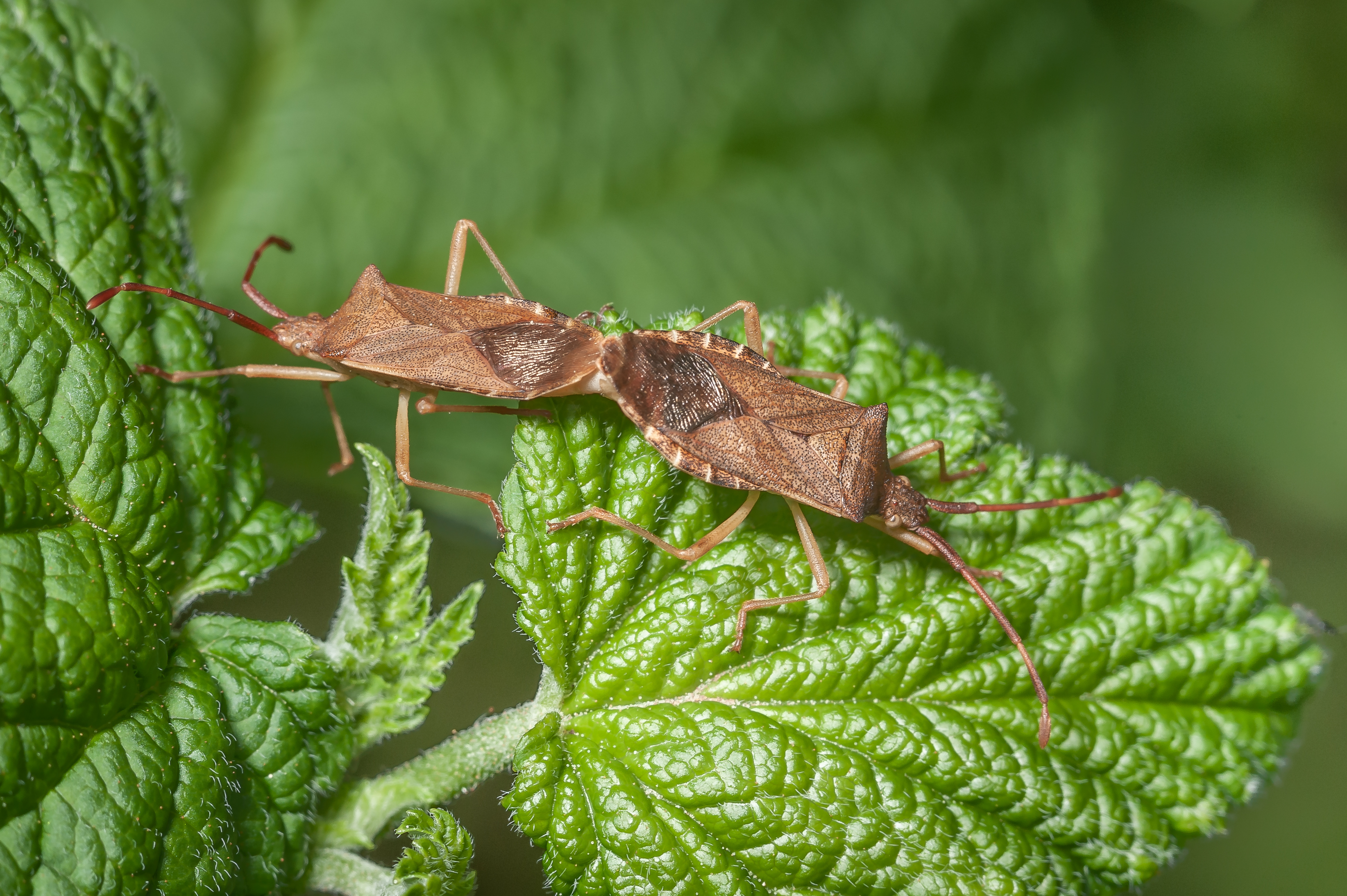
Mating

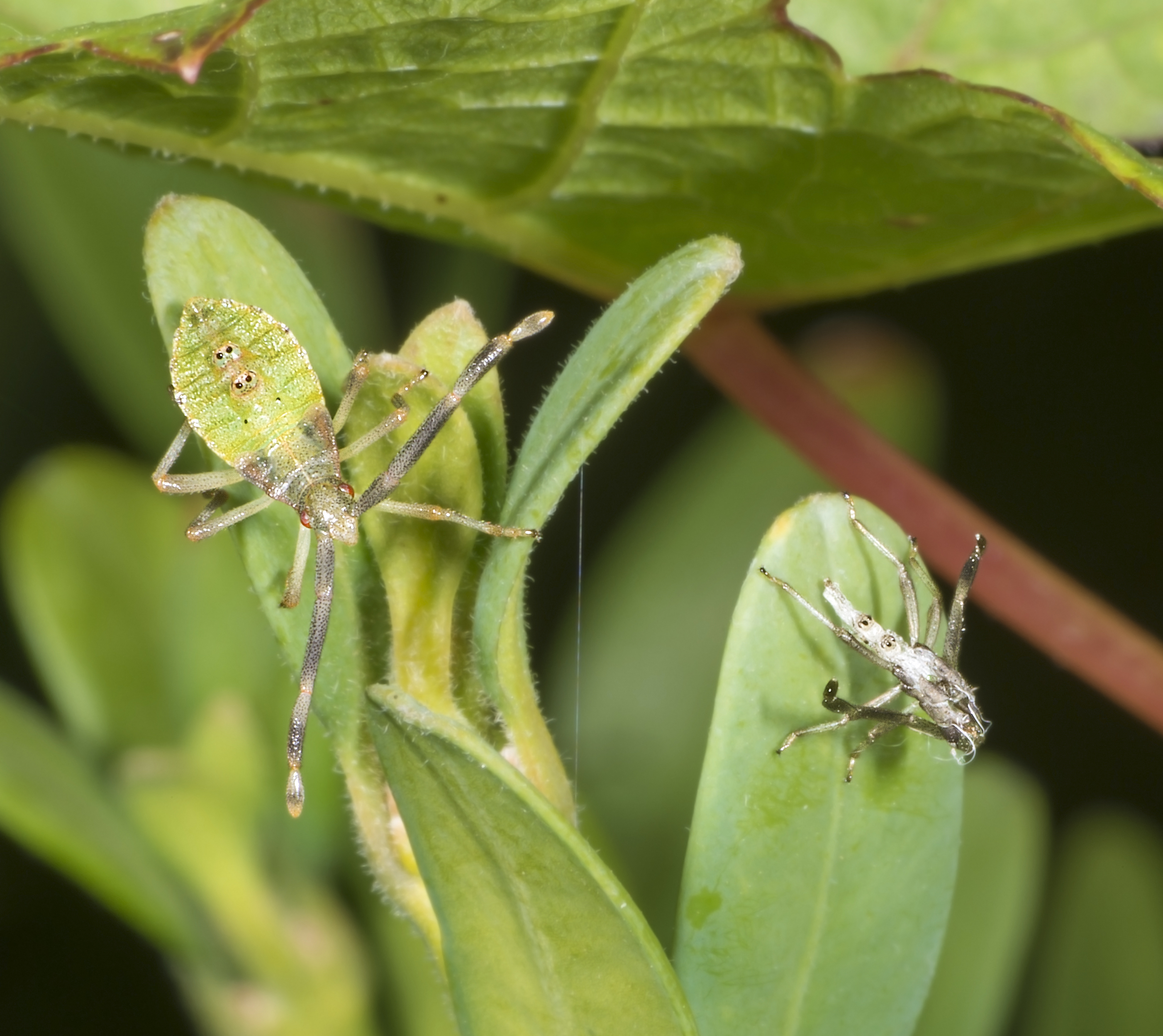
Nymph with exuvia.

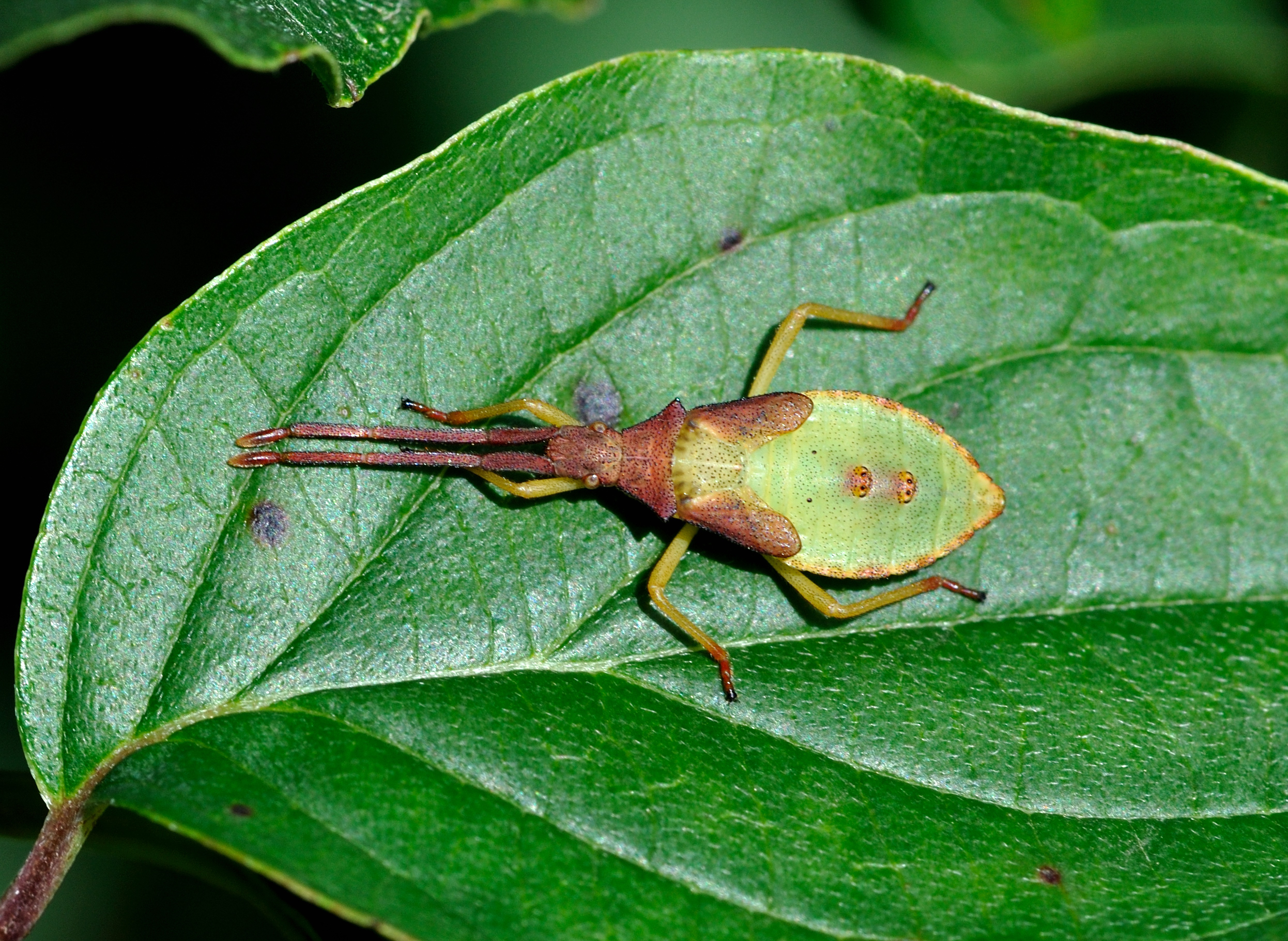
Late instarnymph

Video clip

== Bibliography ==
- Ekkehard Wachmann, Albert Melber, Jürgen Deckert: Wanzen. Band 3: Pentatomomorpha I: Aradoidea (Rindenwanzen), Lygaeoidea (Bodenwanzen u. a.), Pyrrhocoroidea (Feuerwanzen) und Coreoidea (Randwanzen u. a.). Goecke & Evers, Keltern 2007, ISBN 978-3-937783-29-1.
- Ekkehard Wachmann, Albert Melber, Jürgen Deckert: Wanzen. Band 5: Supplementband. Dipsocoromorpha, Nepomorpha, Gerromorpha, Leptopodomorpha, Cimicomorpha und Pentatomomorpha. Goecke & Evers, Keltern 2012, ISBN 978-3-937783-58-1.
