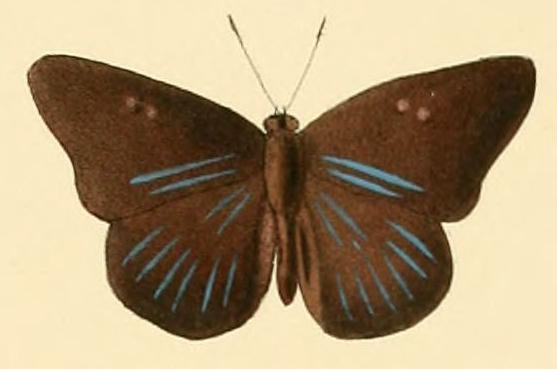

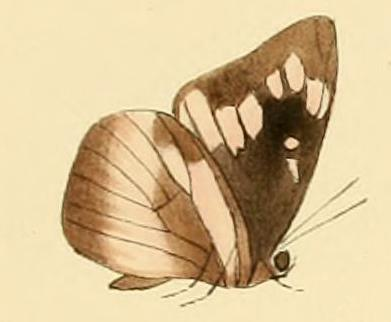

Scientific classification
- Kingdom: Animalia
- Phylum: Arthropoda
- Clade: Pancrustacea
- Class: Insecta
- Order: Lepidoptera
- Family: Lycaenidae
- Genus: Cerautola
- Species: C. ceraunia

Binomial name
- Cerautola ceraunia (Hewitson, 1873)

Synonyms
- Epitola ceraunia Hewitson, 1873; Epitola dewitzi Kirby, 1887

= Cerautola ceraunia =

Silvery epitola

Species of butterfly

Cerautola ceraunia, the silvery epitola, is a butterfly in the family Lycaenidae. It is found in Sierra Leone, Liberia, Ivory Coast, Ghana, Togo, Nigeria (south and the Cross River loop), Cameroon, Gabon, the Republic of the Congo, Angola, the Central African Republic, the Democratic Republic of the Congo, Uganda and north-western Tanzania. Its habitat consists of forests.

Adults have been recorded in February.

The larvae are associated with the ant species Crematogaster buchneri.

Torben Larsen developed a species numbering system for his 2005 publication Butterflies of West Africa. This species is #291. The 'Larsen' numbers have since been used with permission in A Sharp Eye on Butterflies of Ghana.
