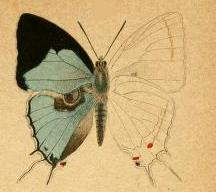

Scientific classification
- Kingdom: Animalia
- Phylum: Arthropoda
- Clade: Pancrustacea
- Class: Insecta
- Order: Lepidoptera
- Family: Lycaenidae
- Genus: Iolaus
- Species: I. alcibiades

Binomial name
- Iolaus alcibiades Kirby, 1871

Synonyms
- Iolaus (Philiolaus) alcibiades; Jolaus julianus Staudinger, 1891

= Iolaus alcibiades =

Species of butterfly

Iolaus alcibiades, the giant sapphire, is a butterfly in the family Lycaenidae. It is found in Guinea, Sierra Leone, Ivory Coast, Ghana, Togo, Nigeria (south and the Cross River loop), Cameroon, Bioko, Gabon, the Republic of the Congo and the Democratic Republic of the Congo (Équateur and Lulua). The habitat consists of forests and more open habitats.

The larvae feed on the flowers of Loranthus incanus. They are associated with the ant species Crematogaster buchneri.

Torben Larsen developed a species numbering system for his 2005 publication Butterflies of West Africa. This species is #400. The 'Larsen' numbers have since been used with permission in A Sharp Eye on Butterflies of Ghana.
