= Cerautola mittoni =

Scientific classification
- Domain: Eukaryota
- Kingdom: Animalia
- Phylum: Arthropoda
- Class: Insecta
- Order: Lepidoptera
- Family: Lycaenidae
- Genus: Cerautola
- Species: C. mittoni

Binomial name
- Cerautola mittoni (Jackson, 1964)

Synonyms
- Hewitsonia mittoni Jackson, 1964

Species of butterfly

Cerautola mittoni is a butterfly in the family Lycaenidae. It is found in Uganda and the Democratic Republic of the Congo.

== Taxonomy ==
The species was previously treated as a synonym of Cerautola crippsi, but was raised to species status in 2013.
