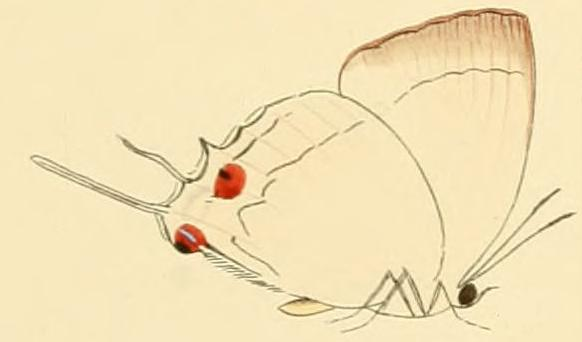

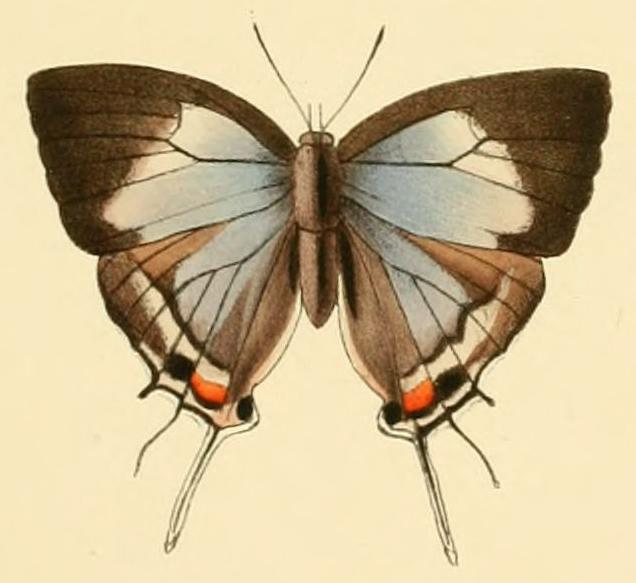

Scientific classification
- Kingdom: Animalia
- Phylum: Arthropoda
- Clade: Pancrustacea
- Class: Insecta
- Order: Lepidoptera
- Family: Lycaenidae
- Genus: Iolaus
- Species: I. iulus

Binomial name
- Iolaus iulus Hewitson, 1869

Synonyms
- Iolaus (Iolaphilus) iulus; Iolaus aelianus Staudinger, 1891; Jolaus matilda Suffert, 1904; Argiolaus jamesoni entebbeae Riley, 1928

= Iolaus iulus =

Species of butterfly

Iolaus iulus, the Iulus sapphire, is a butterfly in the family Lycaenidae. It is found in Senegal (Basse Casamance), Sierra Leone, Liberia, Ivory Coast, Ghana, Togo, southern Nigeria, Cameroon, Gabon, the Republic of the Congo, the Democratic Republic of the Congo, Uganda and Zambia. The habitat consists of forests and cleared lands.

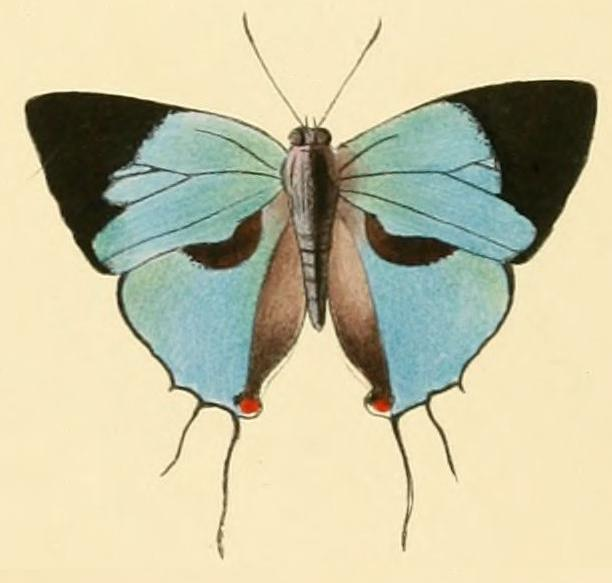

Adults have been recorded feeding from flowers. During the dry season, both sexes mud-puddle.

The larvae feed on the flowers of Loranthus incanus, Globimetula braunii, Globimetula mweroensis, Tapinanthus erianthus and Englerina woodfordioides. They are associated with the ant species Crematogaster buchneri. The larvae are predominantly ruby and green in colour.

Torben Larsen developed a species numbering system for his 2005 publication Butterflies of West Africa. This species is #397. The 'Larsen' numbers have since been used with permission in A Sharp Eye on Butterflies of Ghana.
