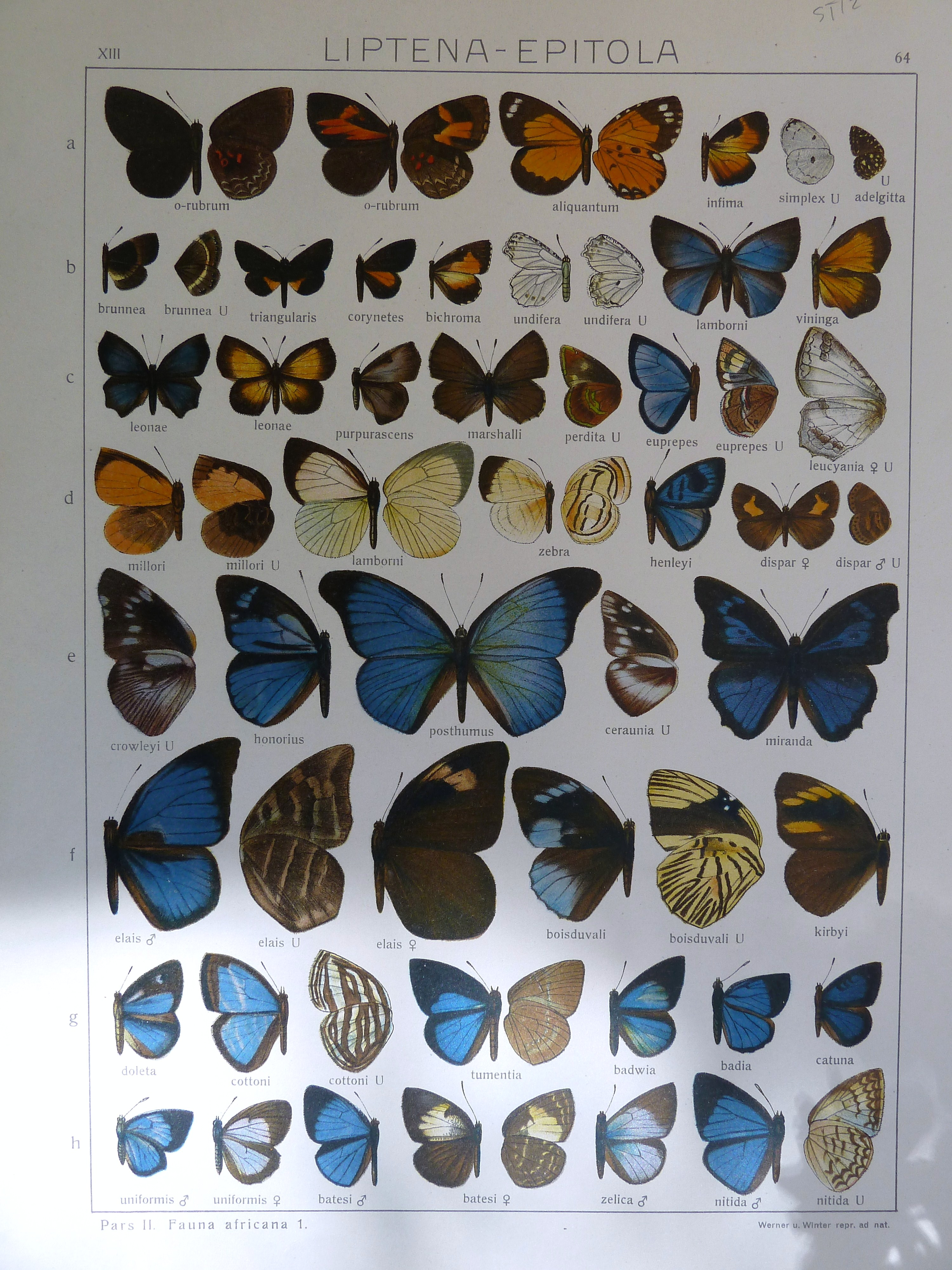
- is Seitz b

Scientific classification
- Kingdom: Animalia
- Phylum: Arthropoda
- Class: Insecta
- Order: Lepidoptera
- Family: Lycaenidae
- Genus: Aslauga
- Species: A. lamborni

Binomial name
- Aslauga lamborni Bethune-Baker, 1914

= Aslauga lamborni =

Species of butterfly

Aslauga lamborni, the Lamborn's aslauga, is a butterfly in the family Lycaenidae. It is found in Sierra Leone, Ivory Coast, Ghana, southern Nigeria, Cameroon, the Republic of the Congo, the Democratic Republic of the Congo and western Uganda. The habitat consists of primary forests.

The larvae feed on Stictococcus sjoestedti. They are associated with the ant species Crematogaster buchneri race winkleri.

== Etymology ==
The name honours British government entomologist Dr. W.A. Lamborn, who worked in tropical Africa.
