= Alaena bicolora =

Scientific classification
- Kingdom: Animalia
- Phylum: Arthropoda
- Class: Insecta
- Order: Lepidoptera
- Family: Lycaenidae
- Genus: Alaena
- Species: A. bicolora

Binomial name
- Alaena bicolora Bethune-Baker, 1924

Species of butterfly

Alaena bicolora is a butterfly in the family Lycaenidae. It is found from eastern to south-western Tanzania. The habitat consists of rocky areas in woodland.
