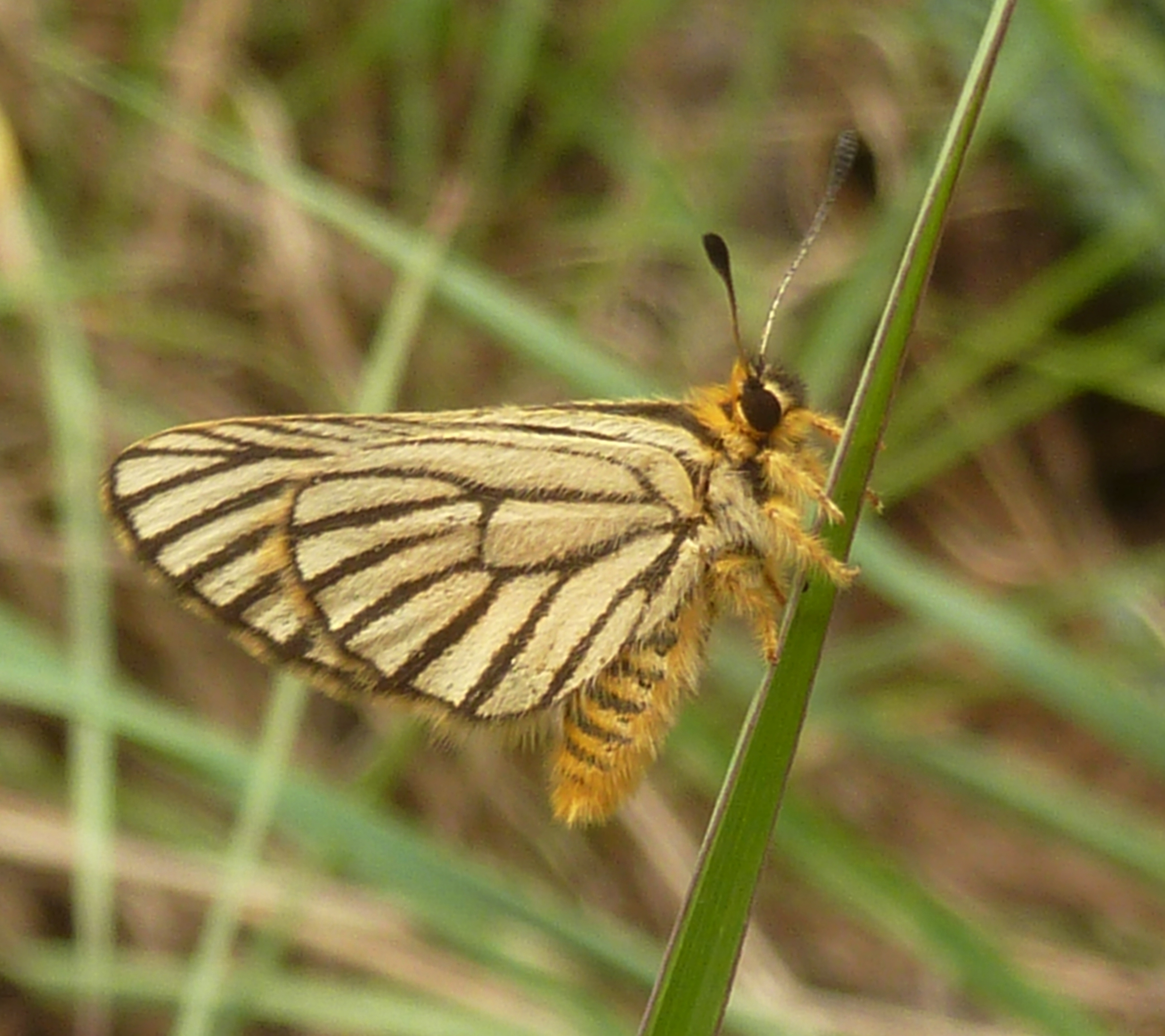
- Alaena amazoula

Scientific classification
- Domain: Eukaryota
- Kingdom: Animalia
- Phylum: Arthropoda
- Class: Insecta
- Order: Lepidoptera
- Family: Lycaenidae
- Subfamily: Poritiinae
- Tribe: Liptenini
- Genus: Alaena; Boisduval, 1847

= Alaena =

Butterfly genus in family Lycaenidae

Alaena is a genus of butterflies, commonly called Zulus, in the family Lycaenidae. They are endemic to the Afrotropics.

== Species ==
Listed alphabetically:

- Alaena amazoula Boisduval, 1847 – yellow Zulu
- Alaena bicolora Bethune-Baker, 1924
- Alaena bjornstadi Kielland, 1993
- Alaena brainei Vári, 1976
- Alaena caissa Rebel & Rogenhofer, 1894
- Alaena dodomaensis Kielland, 1983
- Alaena exotica Collins & Larsen, 2005
- Alaena ferrulineata Hawker-Smith, 1933
- Alaena interposita Butler, 1883
- Alaena johanna Sharpe, 1890 – Johanna's Zulu
- Alaena kiellandi Carcasson, 1965
- Alaena lamborni Gifford, 1965
- Alaena maculata Hawker-Smith, 1933
- Alaena madibirensis Wichgraf, 1921
- Alaena margaritacea Eltringham, 1929 – Wolkberg Zulu
- Alaena ngonga Jackson, 1966
- Alaena nyassa Hewitson, 1877
- Alaena oberthuri Aurivillius, 1899
- Alaena ochracea Gifford, 1965
- Alaena picata Sharpe, 1896
- Alaena reticulata Butler, 1896
- Alaena rosei Vane-Wright, 1980
- Alaena subrubra Bethune-Baker, 1915
- Alaena unimaculosa Hawker-Smith, 1926
