= Alaena ferrulineata =

Scientific classification
- Kingdom: Animalia
- Phylum: Arthropoda
- Class: Insecta
- Order: Lepidoptera
- Family: Lycaenidae
- Genus: Alaena
- Species: A. ferrulineata

Binomial name
- Alaena ferrulineata Hawker-Smith, 1933

Species of butterfly

Alaena ferrulineata is a butterfly in the family Lycaenidae. It is found in northern and southern Tanzania. The habitat consists of rocky hillsides in dry thorn country and mountains at altitudes ranging from 1,000 to 2,000 metres.
