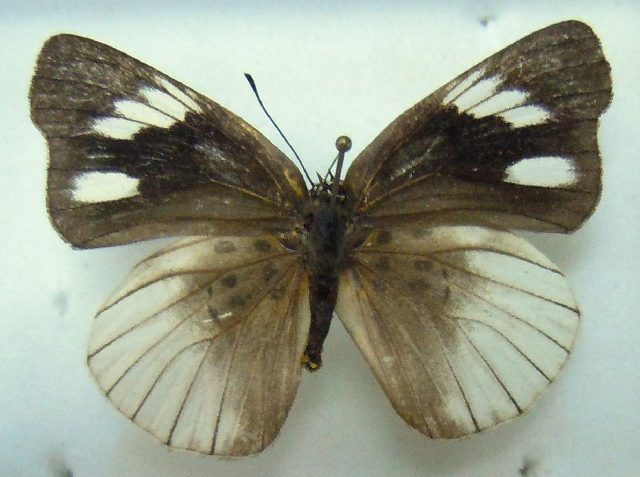

Scientific classification
- Domain: Eukaryota
- Kingdom: Animalia
- Phylum: Arthropoda
- Class: Insecta
- Order: Lepidoptera
- Family: Lycaenidae
- Genus: Cerautola
- Species: C. delassisei

Binomial name
- Cerautola delassisei Bouyer, 2013

= Cerautola delassisei =

Species of butterfly

Cerautola crippsi is a butterfly in the family Lycaenidae. It is found in Cameroon.
