= Cerautola crowleyi =

- Line "e" 1st image

Scientific classification
- Kingdom: Animalia
- Phylum: Arthropoda
- Clade: Pancrustacea
- Class: Insecta
- Order: Lepidoptera
- Family: Lycaenidae
- Genus: Cerautola
- Species: C. crowleyi

Binomial name
- Cerautola crowleyi (Sharpe, 1890)

Synonyms
- Epitola crowleyi Sharpe, 1890; Cerautola (Cerautola) crowleyi; Epitola hewitsoni Staudinger, 1889; Epitola crowleyi holochroma Berger, 1981

Species of butterfly

Cerautola crowleyi, the Crowley's epitola, is a butterfly in the family Lycaenidae. It is found in Guinea-Bissau, Guinea, Sierra Leone, Ivory Coast, Ghana, Togo, Nigeria, Cameroon, Gabon, the Republic of the Congo, the Central African Republic, Angola, the Democratic Republic of the Congo, Uganda, Tanzania and Zambia. Its habitat consists of forests.

The larvae feed on foliate lichen.

Torben Larsen developed a species numbering system for his 2005 publication Butterflies of West Africa. The nominate subspecies is #289. The 'Larsen' numbers have since been used with permission in A Sharp Eye on Butterflies of Ghana.

== Subspecies ==
- C. c. crowleyi (Guinea-Bissau, Guinea, Sierra Leone, Ivory Coast, Ghana, Togo, western Nigeria)
- C. c. congdoni Libert & Collins, 1999 (north-western Tanzania, Zambia)
- C. c. holochroma (Berger, 1981) (eastern Democratic Republic of the Congo, Uganda)
- C. c. leucographa Libert, 1999 (Cameroon, Gabon, Congo, northern Angola, Central African Republic, western Democratic Republic of the Congo)
