= W.A. Lamborn =

- Born: 1877
- Died: 4 March 1959 (aged 81–82)
- Occupation: Medical entomologist, physician
- Awards: Officer of the Order of the British Empire (George V, 1930 New Year Honours, 1930); Licentiate of the Royal College of Physicians

William Alfred Stedwell Lamborn (in literature usually as W.A. Lamborn) OBE (1877 – 4 March 1959) was an English physician and medical entomologist who worked in Southeast Asia and Africa, conducting studies on malaria and trypanosoma while also collecting and studying insects. A number of insect species including Alaena lamborni, Aslauga lamborni, Sphecodemyia lamborni, Praestochrysis lamborni; and the ciliate genus Lambornella are named after him.

Lamborn was born in 1877 at Battle, Sussex and was educated at St Mungo's College, Glasgow, and trained at Middlesex Hospital receiving a medical degree in 1899. He worked at Islington Infirmary and the County Asylum, Oxford as a medical officer before going to British Guiana in 1905. In 1907 he moved to Pietermaritzburg in South Africa and later served in the Nigeria Bitumen Corporation at Lagos as a medical officer. He conducted a malaria survey in the Federated Malay States. In 1913 he was appointed as a medical entomologist in Nigeria but travelled around Africa working for the Imperial Bureau of Entomology. He was involved in studies of tsetse flies around 1917 and worked at Tanga Hospital. In 1918 he became a medical officer in Nyasaland and worked briefly in the Federated Malay States as a medical entomologist in 1920 before returning to Nyasaland. During World War II he served as a Major in Kenya in the R.A.M.C.

Lamborn was appointed an Officer of the Order of the British Empire (OBE) in the 1930 New Year Honours and elected member of the Royal College of Physicians in 1937. He died at his home in Fort Johnston, Malawi. His insect collections are deposited in the Hope Collection at Oxford University.
