= Alaena ochracea =

Scientific classification
- Domain: Eukaryota
- Kingdom: Animalia
- Phylum: Arthropoda
- Class: Insecta
- Order: Lepidoptera
- Family: Lycaenidae
- Genus: Alaena
- Species: A. ochracea

Binomial name
- Alaena ochracea Gifford, 1965

Synonyms
- Alaena nyassae var. ochracea Butler, 1894

Species of butterfly

Alaena ochracea is a butterfly in the family Lycaenidae. It is found in Malawi (from the southern part of the country to the Shire Highlands). The habitat consists of the fringes of submontane evergreen forests.
