= Cerautola decellei =

Scientific classification
- Kingdom: Animalia
- Phylum: Arthropoda
- Clade: Pancrustacea
- Class: Insecta
- Order: Lepidoptera
- Family: Lycaenidae
- Genus: Cerautola
- Species: C. decellei

Binomial name
- Cerautola decellei (Stempffer, 1956)

Synonyms
- Epitola decellei Stempffer, 1956; Cerautola (Hewitola) decellei

Species of butterfly

Cerautola decellei is a butterfly in the family Lycaenidae. It is found in the Democratic Republic of the Congo.
