= Cerautola cuypersi =

Scientific classification
- Kingdom: Animalia
- Phylum: Arthropoda
- Class: Insecta
- Order: Lepidoptera
- Family: Lycaenidae
- Genus: Cerautola
- Species: C. cuypersi

Binomial name
- Cerautola cuypersi Collins & Libert, 2015

Species of butterfly

Cerautola cuypersi is a butterfly in the family Lycaenidae. It is found in the Democratic Republic of Congo.
