= Cerautola fisheri =

Scientific classification
- Domain: Eukaryota
- Kingdom: Animalia
- Phylum: Arthropoda
- Class: Insecta
- Order: Lepidoptera
- Family: Lycaenidae
- Genus: Cerautola
- Species: C. fisheri

Binomial name
- Cerautola fisheri Libert & Collins, 1999

Synonyms
- Cerautola (Cerautola) fisheri

Species of butterfly

Cerautola fisheri is a butterfly in the family Lycaenidae. It is found in Zambia.

The larvae feed on algae and foliate lichen.
