= Alaena ngonga =

Ngong Zulu

Scientific classification
- Domain: Eukaryota
- Kingdom: Animalia
- Phylum: Arthropoda
- Class: Insecta
- Order: Lepidoptera
- Family: Lycaenidae
- Genus: Alaena
- Species: A. ngonga

Binomial name
- Alaena ngonga Jackson, 1966

Species of butterfly

Alaena ngonga, the Ngong Zulu, is a butterfly in the family Lycaenidae. It is found in central Kenya and Tanzania (Masai and Serengeti). The habitat consists of rocky hillsides in savanna.
