= Hewitola stempfferi =

Scientific classification
- Domain: Eukaryota
- Kingdom: Animalia
- Phylum: Arthropoda
- Class: Insecta
- Order: Lepidoptera
- Family: Lycaenidae
- Genus: Cerautola
- Species: C. stempfferi

Binomial name
- Cerautola stempfferi (Jackson, 1962)

Synonyms
- Epitola stempfferi Jackson, 1962; Cerautola (Hewitola) stempfferi

Species of butterfly

Hewitola stempfferi is a butterfly in the family Lycaenidae. It is found in Gabon.
