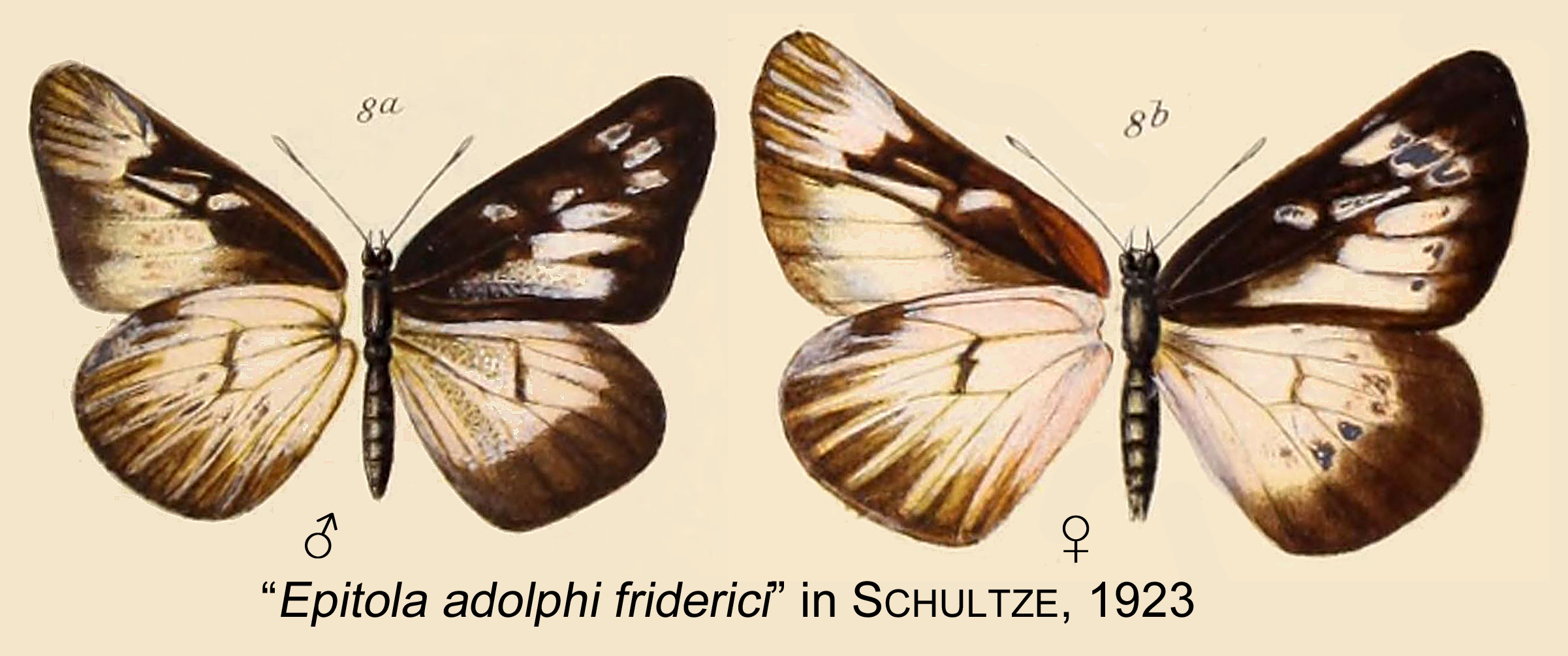

Scientific classification
- Domain: Eukaryota
- Kingdom: Animalia
- Phylum: Arthropoda
- Class: Insecta
- Order: Lepidoptera
- Family: Lycaenidae
- Genus: Cerautola
- Species: C. adolphifriderici

Binomial name
- Cerautola adolphifriderici (Schultze, 1911)

Synonyms
- Epitola adolphi-friderici Schultze, 1911; Epitola adolphifriderici; Cerautola (Cerautola) adolphifriderici

= Cerautola adolphifriderici =

Species of butterfly

Cerautola adolphifriderici is a butterfly in the family Lycaenidae. It is found in Cameroon and the Democratic Republic of the Congo.

The butterfly was named to honour Adolphus Frederick V, Grand Duke of Mecklenburg-Strelitz.
