= Alaena rosei =

Scientific classification
- Domain: Eukaryota
- Kingdom: Animalia
- Phylum: Arthropoda
- Class: Insecta
- Order: Lepidoptera
- Family: Lycaenidae
- Genus: Alaena
- Species: A. rosei

Binomial name
- Alaena rosei Vane-Wright, 1980

Species of butterfly

Alaena rosei is a butterfly in the family Lycaenidae. It is found in Angola, where it is only known from the area near Gabela and the vicinity of Lubango.
