= Alaena kiellandi =

Scientific classification
- Kingdom: Animalia
- Phylum: Arthropoda
- Class: Insecta
- Order: Lepidoptera
- Family: Lycaenidae
- Genus: Alaena
- Species: A. kiellandi

Binomial name
- Alaena kiellandi Carcasson, 1965

Species of butterfly

Alaena kiellandi is a butterfly in the family Lycaenidae. It is found in western Tanzania. The habitat consists of rocky outcrops at altitudes between 1,000 and 1,700 metres.
