= Cerautola =

Scientific classification
- Domain: Eukaryota
- Kingdom: Animalia
- Phylum: Arthropoda
- Class: Insecta
- Order: Lepidoptera
- Family: Lycaenidae
- Subfamily: Poritiinae
- Genus: Cerautola; Libert, 1999

Genus of butterflies

Cerautola is a genus of butterflies in the family Lycaenidae, endemic to the Afrotropical realm.

== Species ==
- Subgenus Cerautola
  - Cerautola adolphifrederici (Schultze, 1911)
  - Cerautola ceraunia (Hewitson, 1873)
  - Cerautola crippsi (Stoneham, 1934)
  - Cerautola crowleyi (Sharpe, 1890)
  - Cerautola cuypersi Libert & Collins, 2015
  - Cerautola delassisei Bouyer, 2013
  - Cerautola fisheri Libert & Collins, 1999
  - Cerautola legeri Libert, 1999
  - Cerautola miranda (Staudinger, 1889)
  - Cerautola mittoni (Jackson, 1964)
  - Cerautola richardsoni Libert & Collins, 2015
  - Cerautola semibrunnea (Bethune-Baker, 1916)
- Subgenus Hewitola Libert, 1999
  - Cerautola decellei (Stempffer, 1956)
  - Cerautola hewitsoni (Mabille, 1877)
  - Cerautola hewitsonioides (Hawker-Smith, 1933)
  - Cerautola stempfferi (Jackson, 1962)
