= Cerautola legeri =

Scientific classification
- Domain: Eukaryota
- Kingdom: Animalia
- Phylum: Arthropoda
- Class: Insecta
- Order: Lepidoptera
- Family: Lycaenidae
- Genus: Cerautola
- Species: C. legeri

Binomial name
- Cerautola legeri Libert, 1999

Synonyms
- Cerautola (Cerautola) legeri

Species of butterfly

Cerautola legeri, the St. Leger's epitola, is a butterfly in the family Lycaenidae. It is found in eastern Nigeria. Its habitat consists of forests.
