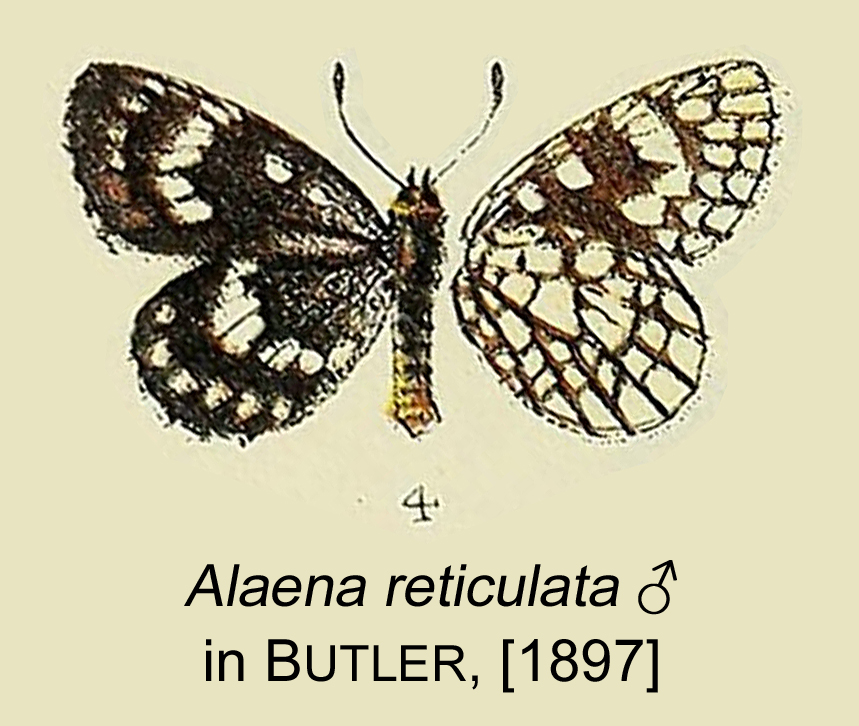

Scientific classification
- Domain: Eukaryota
- Kingdom: Animalia
- Phylum: Arthropoda
- Class: Insecta
- Order: Lepidoptera
- Family: Lycaenidae
- Genus: Alaena
- Species: A. reticulata

Binomial name
- Alaena reticulata Butler, 1896

= Alaena reticulata =

Species of butterfly

Alaena reticulata is a butterfly in the family Lycaenidae. It is found in southern Tanzania, Malawi and Zambia.
