= Alaena exotica =

Jos Zulu

Scientific classification
- Domain: Eukaryota
- Kingdom: Animalia
- Phylum: Arthropoda
- Class: Insecta
- Order: Lepidoptera
- Family: Lycaenidae
- Genus: Alaena
- Species: A. exotica

Binomial name
- Alaena exotica Collins & Larsen, 2005

Species of butterfly

Alaena exotica, the Jos Zulu, is a butterfly in the family Lycaenidae. It is found on the Jos Plateau of Nigeria. The habitat consists of rocky areas with tall grass.

The larvae feed on "blue-green algae" (cyanobacteria) growing on rocks.
