= Alaena bjornstadi =

Scientific classification
- Kingdom: Animalia
- Phylum: Arthropoda
- Class: Insecta
- Order: Lepidoptera
- Family: Lycaenidae
- Genus: Alaena
- Species: A. bjornstadi

Binomial name
- Alaena bjornstadi Kielland, 1993

Species of butterfly

Alaena bjornstadi is a species of butterfly in the family Lycaenidae. It is found in Tanzania. Its habitat consists of rocky grassland.

Adults are on wing from mid-February to mid-March.
