= Cerautola semibrunnea =

Semibrown epitola

Scientific classification
- Kingdom: Animalia
- Phylum: Arthropoda
- Class: Insecta
- Order: Lepidoptera
- Family: Lycaenidae
- Genus: Cerautola
- Species: C. semibrunnea

Binomial name
- Cerautola semibrunnea (Bethune-Baker, 1916)

Synonyms
- Epitola crowleyi var. semibrunnea Bethune-Baker, 1916; Cerautola (Cerautola) semibrunnea; Epitola ammon Joicey and Talbot, 1921

Species of butterfly

Cerautola semibrunnea, the semibrown epitola, is a butterfly in the family Lycaenidae. It is found in Nigeria, Cameroon, the Central African Republic, the Democratic Republic of the Congo, Uganda and Tanzania. Its habitat consists of forests.

== Subspecies ==
- Cerautola semibrunnea semibrunnea (Nigeria: Cross River loop, Cameroon, Central African Republic, Democratic Republic of the Congo, Uganda)
- Cerautola semibrunnea bamptoni Libert & Collins, 1999 (north-western Tanzania)
