= Alaena lamborni =

Scientific classification
- Kingdom: Animalia
- Phylum: Arthropoda
- Clade: Pancrustacea
- Class: Insecta
- Order: Lepidoptera
- Family: Lycaenidae
- Genus: Alaena
- Species: A. lamborni

Binomial name
- Alaena lamborni Gifford, 1965

Synonyms
- Alaena ackeryi d'Abrera, 1980

Species of butterfly

Alaena lamborni is a butterfly in the family Lycaenidae. It is found in southern Malawi.

It is named for W.A. Lamborn.
