= Cerautola hewitsonioides =

Scientific classification
- Domain: Eukaryota
- Kingdom: Animalia
- Phylum: Arthropoda
- Class: Insecta
- Order: Lepidoptera
- Family: Lycaenidae
- Genus: Cerautola
- Species: C. hewitsonioides

Binomial name
- Cerautola hewitsonioides (Hawker-Smith, 1933)

Synonyms
- Epitola hewitsonioides Hawker-Smith, 1933; Cerautola (Hewitola) hewitsonioides

Species of butterfly

Cerautola hewitsonioides is a butterfly in the family Lycaenidae. It is found in Cameroon, the Republic of the Congo, the Central African Republic and the Democratic Republic of the Congo.
