= Alaena madibirensis =

Scientific classification
- Kingdom: Animalia
- Phylum: Arthropoda
- Class: Insecta
- Order: Lepidoptera
- Family: Lycaenidae
- Genus: Alaena
- Species: A. madibirensis

Binomial name
- Alaena madibirensis Wichgraf, 1921

Species of butterfly

Alaena madibirensis is a butterfly in the family Lycaenidae. It is found in Tanzania. The habitat consists of rocky, Brachystegia-clad hills.
