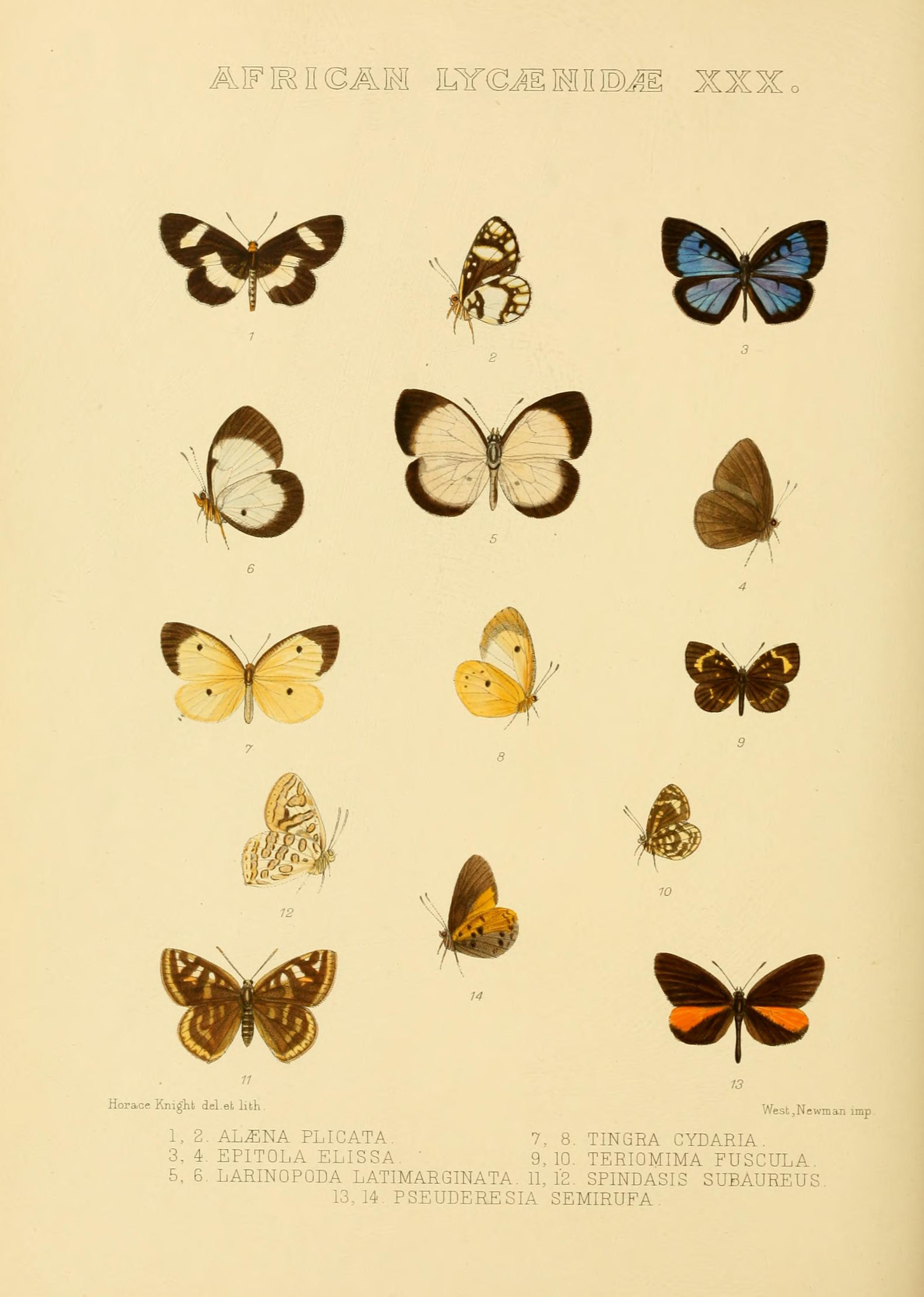
- Figures 1 and 2

Scientific classification
- Domain: Eukaryota
- Kingdom: Animalia
- Phylum: Arthropoda
- Class: Insecta
- Order: Lepidoptera
- Family: Lycaenidae
- Genus: Alaena
- Species: A. picata

Binomial name
- Alaena picata Sharpe, 1896

Synonyms
- Alaena rollei Suffert, 1904; Alaena mulsa Thieme, 1904; Alaena picata connectens Talbot, 1935

= Alaena picata =

Species of butterfly

Alaena picata is a butterfly in the family Lycaenidae. It is found in Kenya, Tanzania and Malawi. The habitat consists of rocky stream beds in forests and forest margins at altitudes ranging from 300 to 1,500 metres.

The larvae possibly feed on tree lichens.

== Subspecies ==
- Alaena picata picata (Kenya: south-east, including the coast, eastern Tanzania)
- Alaena picata interrupta Hawker-Smith, 1933 (Malawi: south to the south-western slopes of Mount Mlanje)
