= Alaena subrubra =

Scientific classification
- Kingdom: Animalia
- Phylum: Arthropoda
- Class: Insecta
- Order: Lepidoptera
- Family: Lycaenidae
- Genus: Alaena
- Species: A. subrubra

Binomial name
- Alaena subrubra Bethune-Baker, 1915

Species of butterfly

Alaena subrubra is a butterfly in the family Lycaenidae. It is found in southern Sudan, northern Uganda and the Central African Republic.

The larvae have been reported feeding on Rhus species, but this seems highly doubtful.
