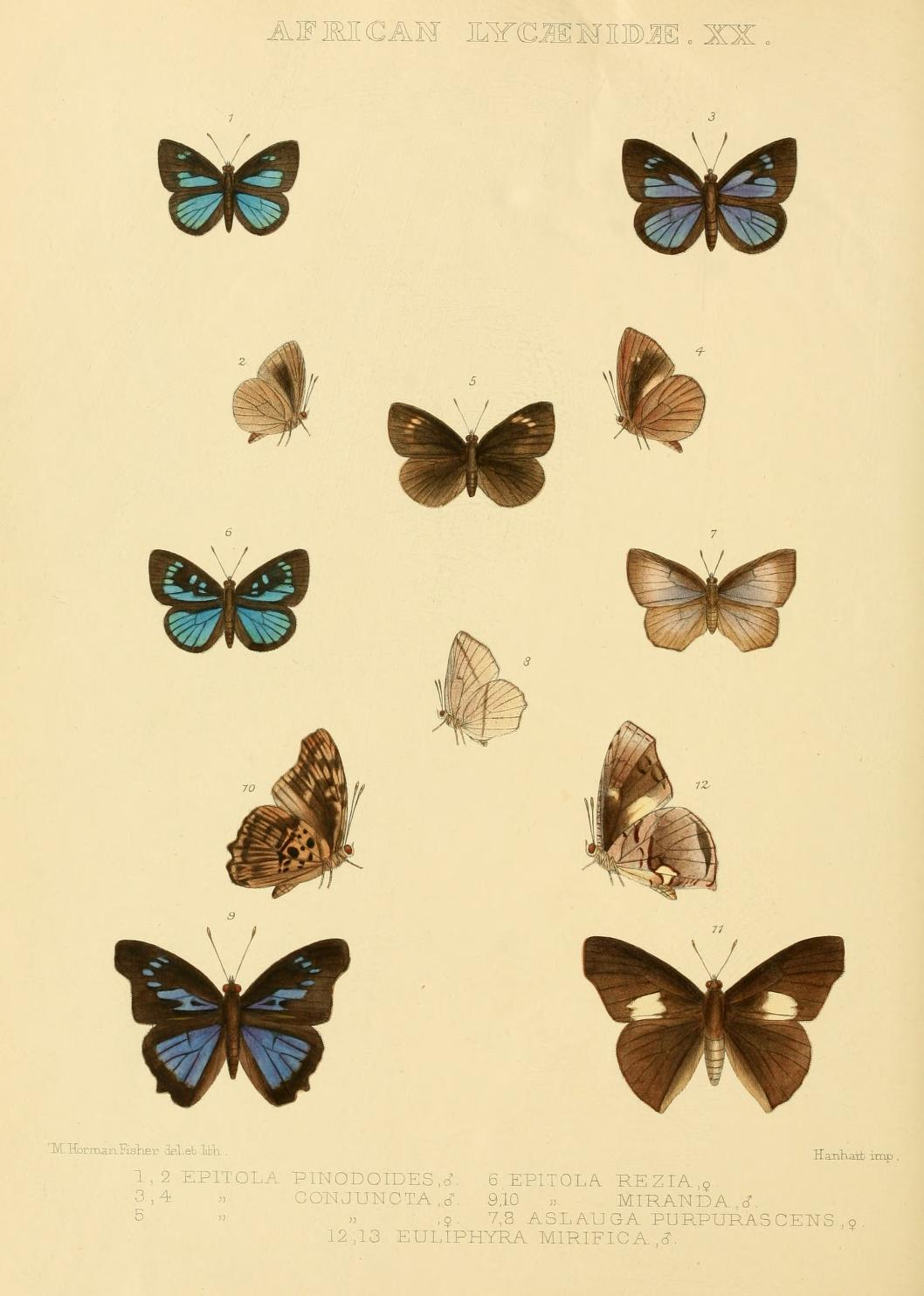
- figures, 9, 10

Scientific classification
- Kingdom: Animalia
- Phylum: Arthropoda
- Clade: Pancrustacea
- Class: Insecta
- Order: Lepidoptera
- Family: Lycaenidae
- Genus: Cerautola
- Species: C. miranda

Binomial name
- Cerautola miranda (Staudinger, 1889)

Synonyms
- Epitola miranda Staudinger, 1889; Cerautola (Cerautola) miranda; Epitola vidua Talbot, 1935

= Cerautola miranda =

Species of butterfly

Cerautola miranda, the wondrous epitola, is a butterfly in the family Lycaenidae. It is found in Guinea, Sierra Leone, Ivory Coast, Ghana, Togo, Nigeria, Cameroon, Gabon, the Republic of the Congo, the Central African Republic, Angola, the Democratic Republic of the Congo, Uganda, Kenya, Tanzania and Zambia. Its habitat consists of forests and forest edges.

== Subspecies ==
- Cerautola miranda miranda (Guinea, Sierra Leone, Ivory Coast, Ghana, Togo, western Nigeria)
- Cerautola miranda vidua (Talbot, 1935) (eastern Nigeria, Cameroon, Congo, Central African Republic, Gabon, Democratic Republic of the Congo, Angola, Uganda, western Kenya, Tanzania, Zambia)

Torben Larsen developed a species numbering system for his 2005 publication Butterflies of West Africa. The nominate subspecies is #293. The 'Larsen' numbers have since been used with permission in A Sharp Eye on Butterflies of Ghana.
