= Alaena maculata =

Scientific classification
- Kingdom: Animalia
- Phylum: Arthropoda
- Class: Insecta
- Order: Lepidoptera
- Family: Lycaenidae
- Genus: Alaena
- Species: A. maculata

Binomial name
- Alaena maculata Hawker-Smith, 1933

Synonyms
- Alaena maculata ochrea Hawker-Smith, 1933

Species of butterfly

Alaena maculata is a butterfly in the family Lycaenidae. It is found in the Democratic Republic of the Congo (from the south-eastern part of the country to Sankuru and Lualaba).
