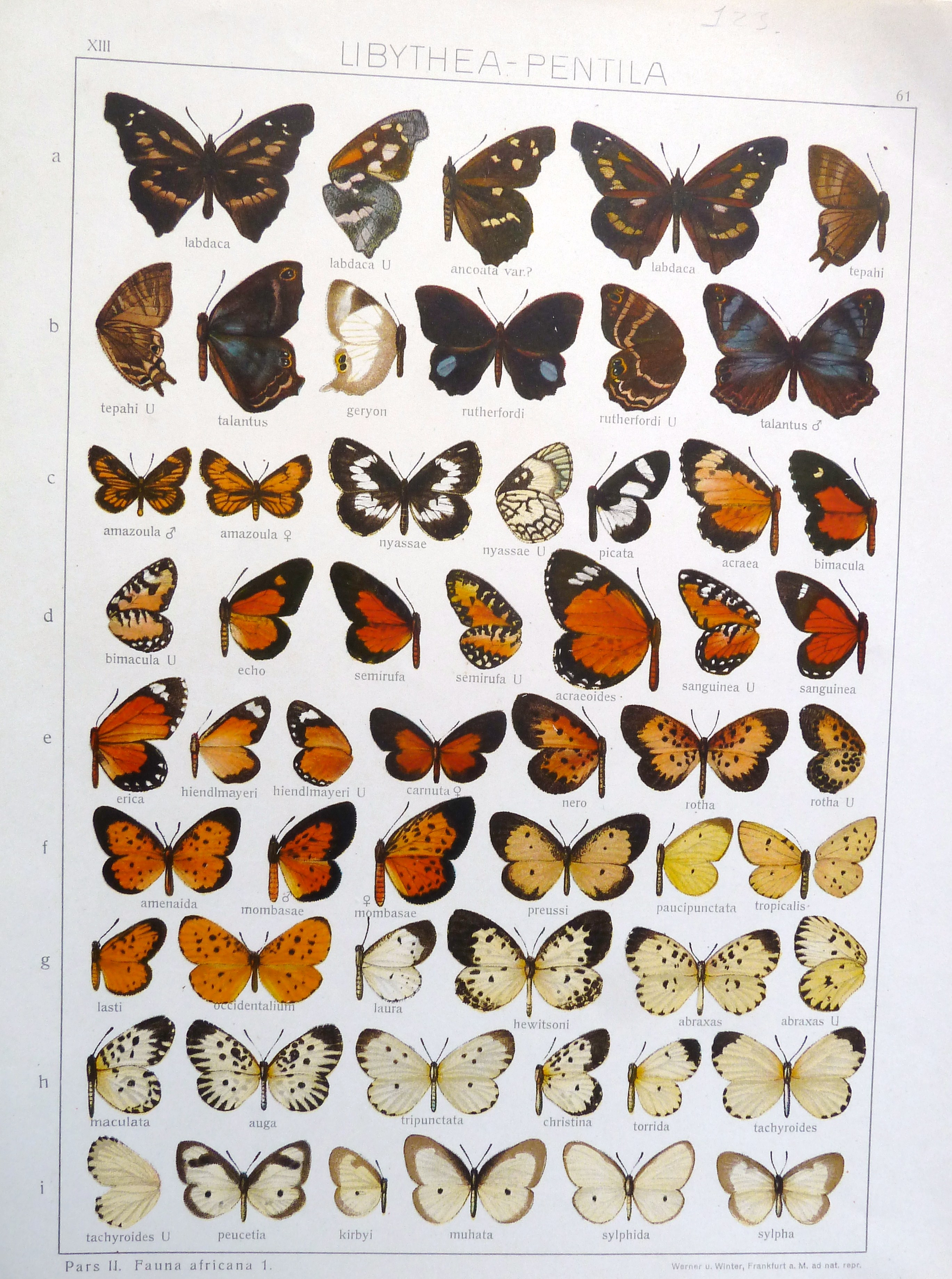
- In Adalbert Seitz's Fauna Africana

Scientific classification
- Kingdom: Animalia
- Phylum: Arthropoda
- Clade: Pancrustacea
- Class: Insecta
- Order: Lepidoptera
- Family: Lycaenidae
- Genus: Alaena
- Species: A. nyassa

Binomial name
- Alaena nyassa Hewitson, 1877

Synonyms
- Alaena major Oberthür, 1888

= Alaena nyassa =

Pied Zulu

Species of butterfly

Alaena nyassa, the pied Zulu, is a butterfly in the family Lycaenidae. It is found in the Democratic Republic of the Congo, Tanzania, Malawi, Zambia, Mozambique and Zimbabwe. The habitat consists of riverine woodland, grassy places in savanna regions, montane grassland with rocky outcrops, forest margins, heavy woodland and rocky streams.

Adults have been recorded nearly year round, except June and July.

The larvae feed on cyanobacteria growing on rocks.

== Subspecies ==
- Alaena nyassa nyassa (Tanzania, Malawi, Mozambique, Zimbabwe)
- Alaena nyassa major Oberthür, 1888 (north-eastern Tanzania)
- Alaena nyassa marmorata Hawker-Smith, 1933 (Democratic Republic of the Congo: Haut-Lomani and Lualaba, Zambia: Copperbelt to the east and north-east)
