= Alaena dodomaensis =

Scientific classification
- Kingdom: Animalia
- Phylum: Arthropoda
- Class: Insecta
- Order: Lepidoptera
- Family: Lycaenidae
- Genus: Alaena
- Species: A. dodomaensis

Binomial name
- Alaena dodomaensis Kielland, 1983

Species of butterfly

Alaena dodomaensis is a butterfly in the family Lycaenidae. It is found in Tanzania. The habitat consists of medium altitude Brachystegia woodland and thornbush on rocky hillsides at altitudes ranging from 700 to 1,400 metres.
