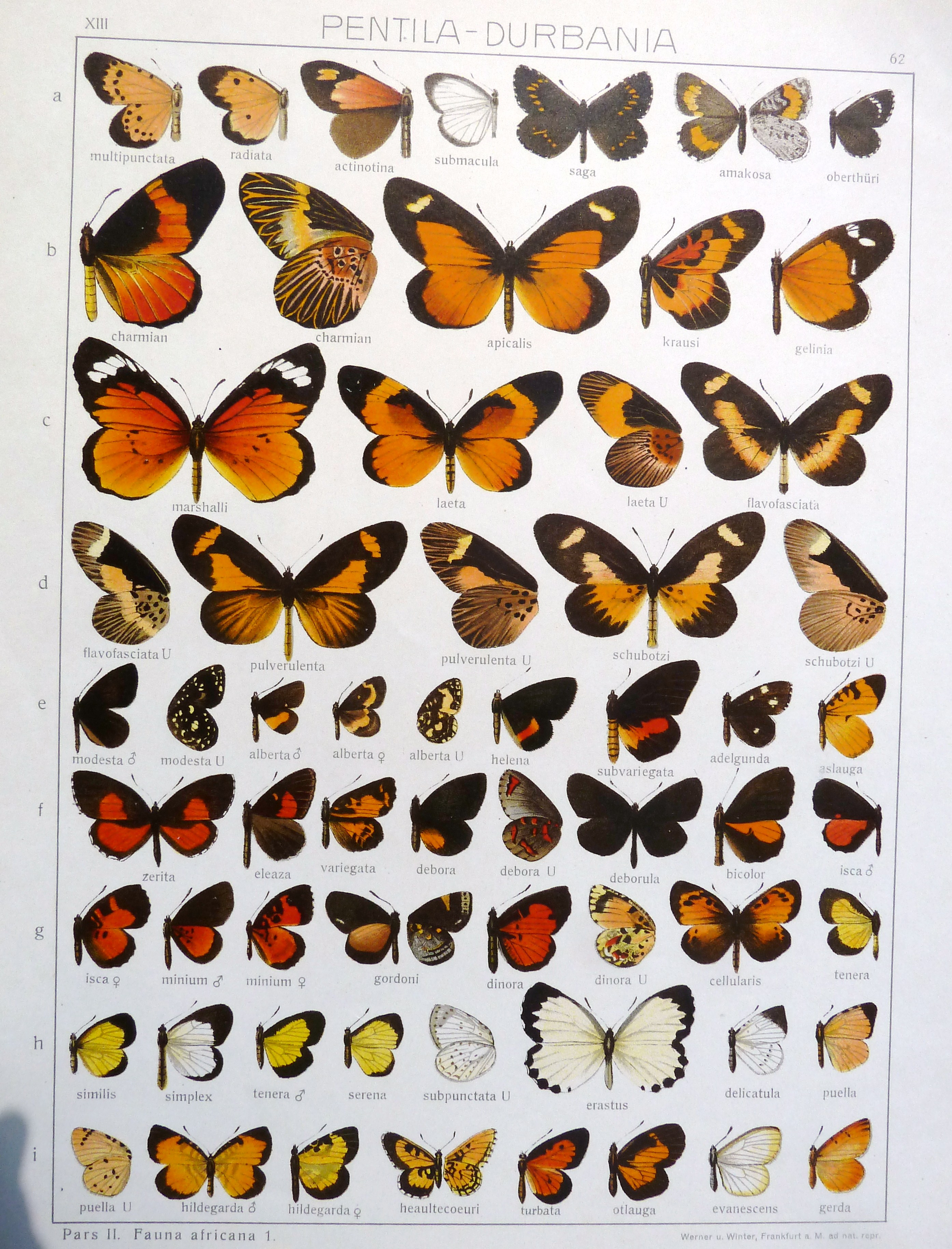
- In Adalbert Seitz's Fauna Africana

Scientific classification
- Kingdom: Animalia
- Phylum: Arthropoda
- Class: Insecta
- Order: Lepidoptera
- Family: Lycaenidae
- Genus: Alaena
- Species: A. oberthuri

Binomial name
- Alaena oberthuri Aurivillius, 1899

= Alaena oberthuri =

Species of butterfly

Alaena oberthuri is a butterfly in the family Lycaenidae. It is found in the Democratic Republic of the Congo (from the south-eastern part of the country to Haut-Lomami). The species was first described by Per Olof Christopher Aurivillius in 1899.
