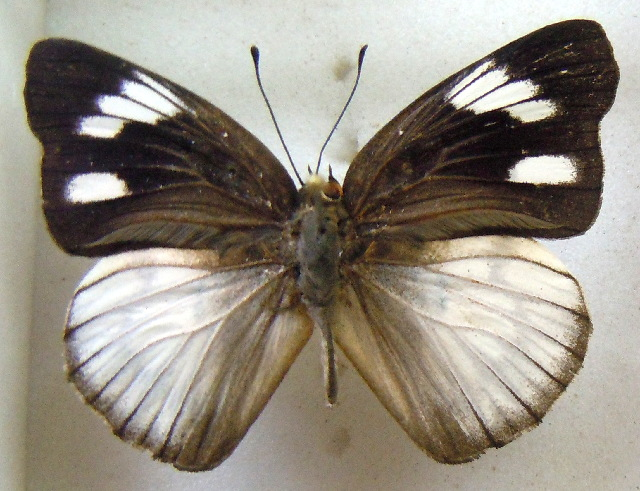

Scientific classification
- Kingdom: Animalia
- Phylum: Arthropoda
- Class: Insecta
- Order: Lepidoptera
- Family: Lycaenidae
- Genus: Cerautola
- Species: C. richardsoni

Binomial name
- Cerautola richardsoni Collins & Libert, 2015

= Cerautola richardsoni =

Species of butterfly

Cerautola richardsoni is a butterfly in the family Lycaenidae. It is found in Cameroon.
