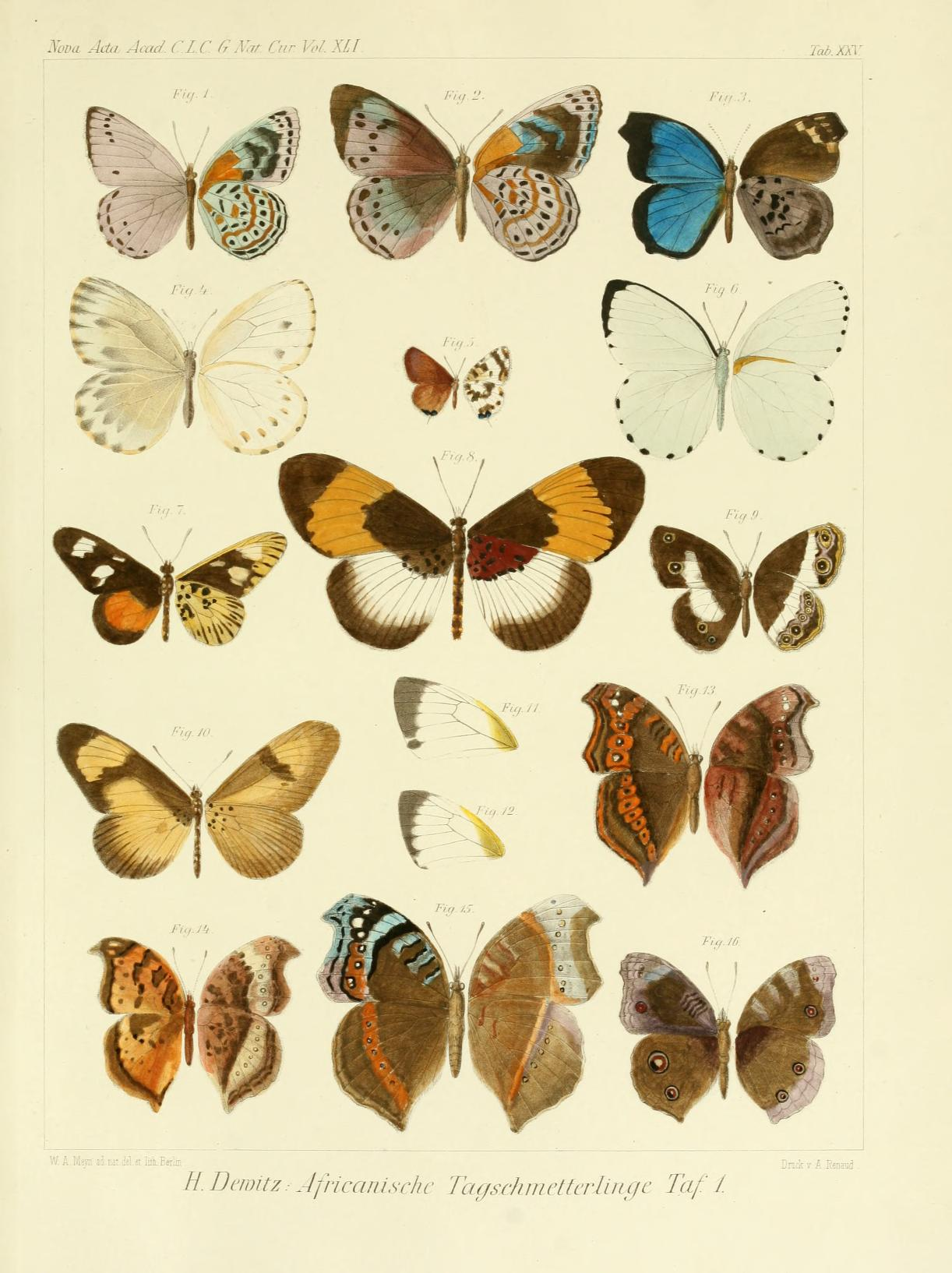
- Figure 3

Scientific classification
- Domain: Eukaryota
- Kingdom: Animalia
- Phylum: Arthropoda
- Class: Insecta
- Order: Lepidoptera
- Family: Lycaenidae
- Genus: Cerautola
- Species: C. hewitsoni

Binomial name
- Cerautola hewitsoni (Mabille, 1877)

Synonyms
- Amblypodia hewitsoni Mabille, 1877; Cerautola (Hewitola) hewitsoni; Plebeius falkensteinii Dewitz, 1879; ?Epitola stempfferi Jackson, 1962

= Cerautola hewitsoni =

Species of butterfly

Cerautola hewitsoni is a butterfly in the family Lycaenidae. It is found in Cameroon, the Republic of the Congo and the Central African Republic.
