= Alaena unimaculosa =

Scientific classification
- Kingdom: Animalia
- Phylum: Arthropoda
- Class: Insecta
- Order: Lepidoptera
- Family: Lycaenidae
- Genus: Alaena
- Species: A. unimaculosa

Binomial name
- Alaena unimaculosa Hawker-Smith, 1926

Species of butterfly

Alaena unimaculosa is a butterfly in the family Lycaenidae. It is found in the Democratic Republic of the Congo (Lualaba), Tanzania and Zambia. The habitat consists of rocky areas in woodland and montane grassland.

== Subspecies ==
- Alaena unimaculosa unimaculosa (Democratic Republic of the Congo: Lualaba)
- Alaena unimaculosa aurantiaca Butler, 1895 (Tanzania: south-west to the Tabora Region, northern Zambia)
