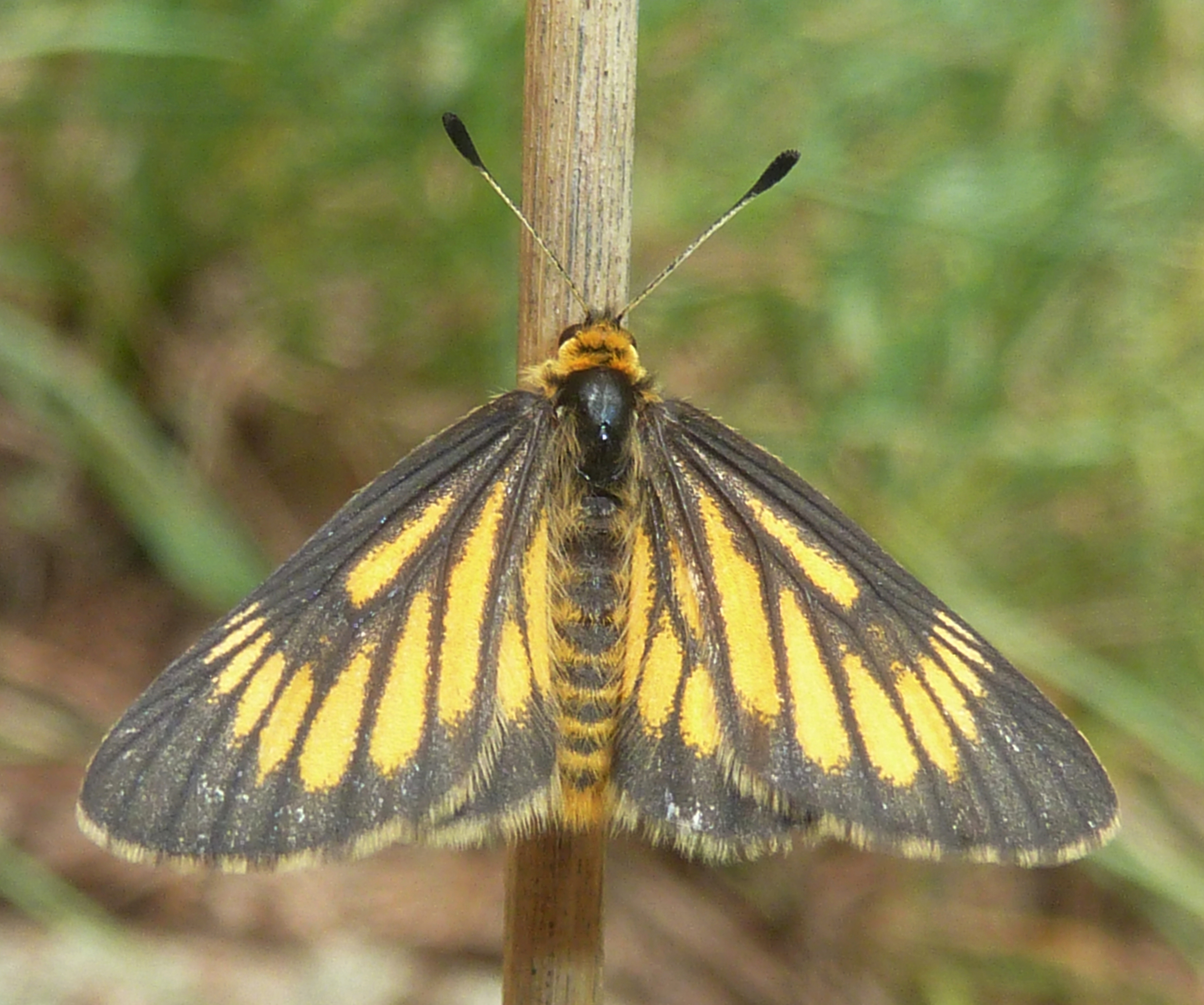
- A. a. ochroma, male
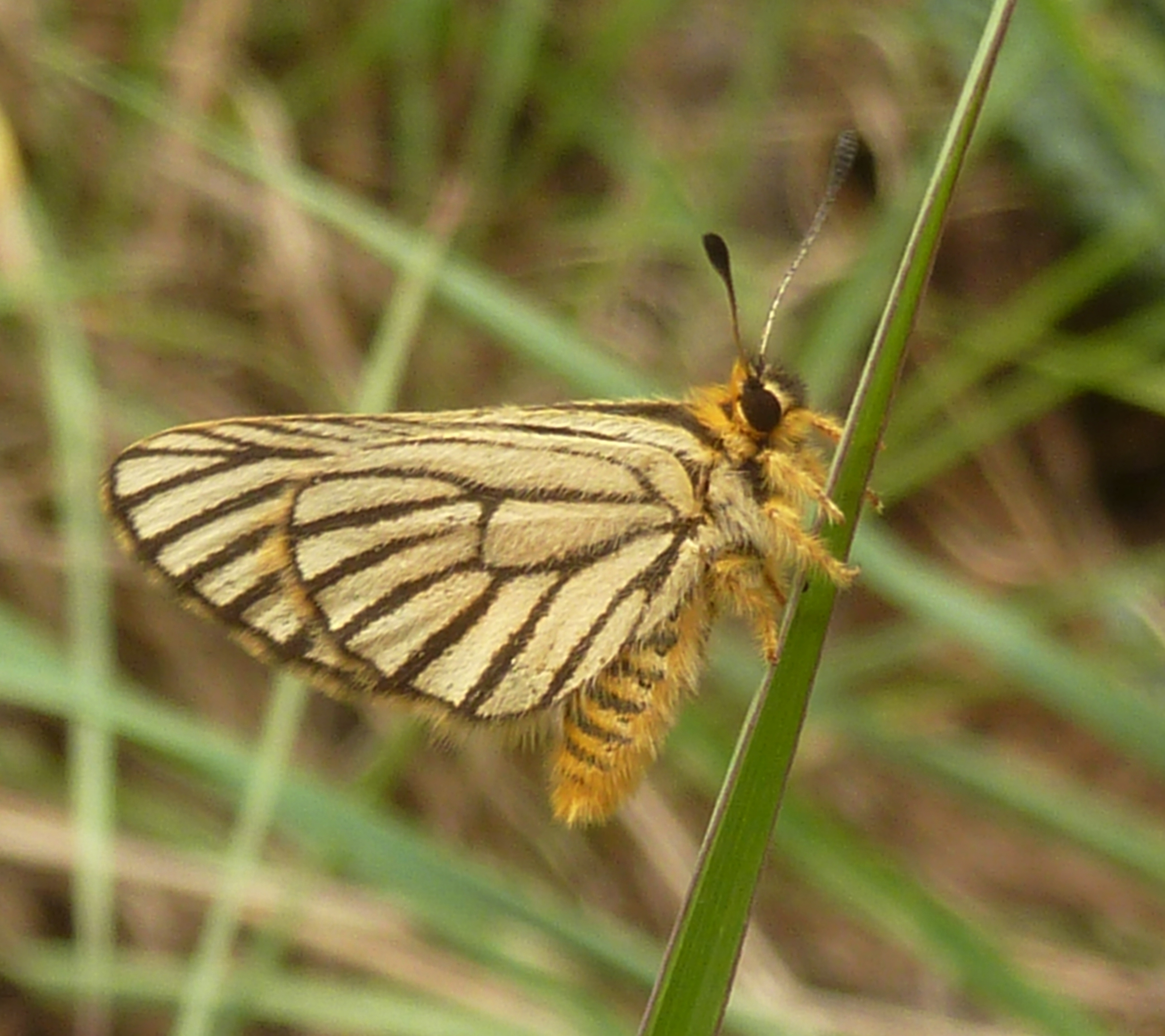
- Wing underside

Scientific classification
- Kingdom: Animalia
- Phylum: Arthropoda
- Clade: Pancrustacea
- Class: Insecta
- Order: Lepidoptera
- Family: Lycaenidae
- Genus: Alaena
- Species: A. amazoula

Binomial name
- Alaena amazoula (Boisduval, 1847)

Synonyms
- Acraea amazoula Boisduval, 1847; Alaena amazoula amazoula ab. orphina Vári, 1976; Alaena amazoula f. congoana Aurivillius, 1914

= Alaena amazoula =

Yellow Zulu

Species of butterfly

Alaena amazoula, the yellow Zulu, is a butterfly of the family Lycaenidae. It is found in southern Africa.

The wingspan is 22–28 mm for males and 25–32 mm for females. Adults are on wing from October to May (with a peak from December to January). There is one generation per year.

The larvae feed on Cyanobacteria species.

== Subspecies ==
- A. a. amazoula (Eastern Cape to northern KwaZulu-Natal)
- A. a. congoana Aurivillius, 1914 (southern Zaire, Angola, Namibia)
- A. a. nyasana Hawker-Smith, 1933
- A. a. ochroma Vári, 1976 (Eswatini to Mpumalanga, Gauteng, the Free State, Limpopo, North West, Mozambique, Zimbabwe)
