= Alaena brainei =

Braine's Zulu

Conservation status
- Least Concern (IUCN 3.1)

Scientific classification
- Kingdom: Animalia
- Phylum: Arthropoda
- Class: Insecta
- Order: Lepidoptera
- Family: Lycaenidae
- Genus: Alaena
- Species: A. brainei

Binomial name
- Alaena brainei Vári, 1976

Species of butterfly

Alaena brainei, the Braine's Zulu, is a butterfly in the family Lycaenidae. It is found in north-central Namibia. The habitat consists of rocky grassland.

Adults are on wing from November to the beginning of May.

Larvae feed on algae (Cyanobacteria) growing on rocks.
