= Alaena margaritacea =

Wolkberg Zulu

Conservation status
- Critically Endangered (IUCN 3.1)

Scientific classification
- Kingdom: Animalia
- Phylum: Arthropoda
- Class: Insecta
- Order: Lepidoptera
- Family: Lycaenidae
- Genus: Alaena
- Species: A. margaritacea

Binomial name
- Alaena margaritacea Eltringham, 1929

Species of butterfly

Alaena margaritacea, the Wolkberg Zulu, is a species of Zulu butterfly in the family Lycaenidae. It is endemic to South Africa, where it is only known from grassy slopes adjoining Afromontane forest in the Haenertsburg area of Limpopo near the Wolkberg mountain range.

It is under severe threat from alien tree plantations as only two colonies are known to exist.

The wingspan is 24–27 mm for males and 28–30 mm for females. Adults are on wing from late December to early January. There is one generation per year.

The larvae feed on species of cyanobacteria. Intriguing female behaviour has been observed recently, possibly related to attracting mates or keeping ants away from a food source.
