= Cerautola crippsi =

Scientific classification
- Domain: Eukaryota
- Kingdom: Animalia
- Phylum: Arthropoda
- Class: Insecta
- Order: Lepidoptera
- Family: Lycaenidae
- Genus: Cerautola
- Species: C. crippsi

Binomial name
- Cerautola crippsi (Stoneham, 1934)

Synonyms
- Hewitsonia crippsi Stoneham, 1934; Hewitsonia mittoni Jackson, 1964

Species of butterfly

Cerautola crippsi is a butterfly in the family Lycaenidae. It is found in Uganda, Cameroon and Kenya.

The larvae are found on the bark of trees, usually in fairly open country. Although Crematogaster ants are always present, they do not appear to attend the larvae. The larvae probably feed on lichens.

== Subspecies ==
- Cerautola crippsi crippsi (eastern Uganda, western Kenya)
- Cerautola crippsi teresae Libert, 2015 (northern Cameroon)
