= List of lycaenid genera: I =

The large butterfly family Lycaenidae contains the following genera starting with the letter I:

- Iaspis
- Icaricia
- Ignata
- Incisalia
- Iolana
- Iolaphilus
- Iolaus
- Ionolyce
- Iophanus
- Ipidecla
- Iraota
- Iratsume
- Iridana
- Itylos
