= Iolaus kelle =

Scientific classification
- Kingdom: Animalia
- Phylum: Arthropoda
- Class: Insecta
- Order: Lepidoptera
- Family: Lycaenidae
- Genus: Iolaus
- Species: I. kelle

Binomial name
- Iolaus kelle Stempffer, 1967

Species of butterfly

Iolaus kelle is a butterfly in the family Lycaenidae. It is found in the Republic of the Congo.
