= Iolaus coelestis =

Scientific classification
- Kingdom: Animalia
- Phylum: Arthropoda
- Class: Insecta
- Order: Lepidoptera
- Family: Lycaenidae
- Genus: Iolaus
- Species: I. coelestis

Binomial name
- Iolaus coelestis Bethune-Baker, 1926

Synonyms
- Iolaus (Epamera) coelestis

Species of butterfly

Iolaus coelestis, the eastern fine sapphire, is a butterfly in the family Lycaenidae. It is found in Nigeria (the eastern part of the country and the Cross River loop), Cameroon, Gabon, the Republic of the Congo, the Democratic Republic of the Congo and Zambia.
