= Iolaus apatosa =

Scientific classification
- Kingdom: Animalia
- Phylum: Arthropoda
- Class: Insecta
- Order: Lepidoptera
- Family: Lycaenidae
- Genus: Iolaus
- Species: I. apatosa

Binomial name
- Iolaus apatosa (Stempffer, 1952)

Synonyms
- Epamera aemulus apatosa Stempffer, 1952; Iolaus (Epamera) apatosa; Epamera aemulus f. apatosa Talbot, 1935

Species of butterfly

Iolaus apatosa is a butterfly in the family Lycaenidae. It is found along the coast of Kenya and the northern coast of Tanzania. The habitat consists of open forests and moist savanna.

The larvae feed on Helixanthera species, including H. kirkii.
