= Iolaus pollux =

Scientific classification
- Kingdom: Animalia
- Phylum: Arthropoda
- Class: Insecta
- Order: Lepidoptera
- Family: Lycaenidae
- Genus: Iolaus
- Species: I. pollux

Binomial name
- Iolaus pollux Aurivillius, 1895

Synonyms
- Jolaus (Epamera) pollux Aurivillius, 1895; Iolaus (Epamera) pollux; Iolaus parva Bethune-Baker, 1926; Epamera pollux albocaerulea Riley, 1929; Epamera pollux oberthueri Riley, 1929

Species of butterfly

Iolaus pollux, the Pollux sapphire, is a butterfly in the family Lycaenidae. It is found in Ivory Coast, Nigeria, Cameroon, Gabon, the Republic of the Congo, the Democratic Republic of the Congo, Uganda, Kenya and Zambia. The habitat consists of forests.

The larvae feed on Agelanthus krausei.

== Subspecies ==
- Iolaus pollux pollux (Nigeria: south and the Cross River loop, Cameroon, Gabon, Congo, Democratic Republic of the Congo)
- Iolaus pollux albocaerulea (Riley, 1929) (Uganda, western Kenya, northern Zambia, Democratic Republic of the Congo: Sankuru, Lualaba and Uele)
- Iolaus pollux oberthueri (Riley, 1929) (Ivory Coast)
