= Iolaus bergeri =

Scientific classification
- Kingdom: Animalia
- Phylum: Arthropoda
- Class: Insecta
- Order: Lepidoptera
- Family: Lycaenidae
- Genus: Iolaus
- Species: I. bergeri

Binomial name
- Iolaus bergeri (Stempffer, 1953)

Synonyms
- Argiolaus bergeri Stempffer, 1953; Iolaus (Argiolaus) bergeri

Species of butterfly

Iolaus bergeri is a butterfly in the family Lycaenidae. It is found in the Democratic Republic of the Congo.
