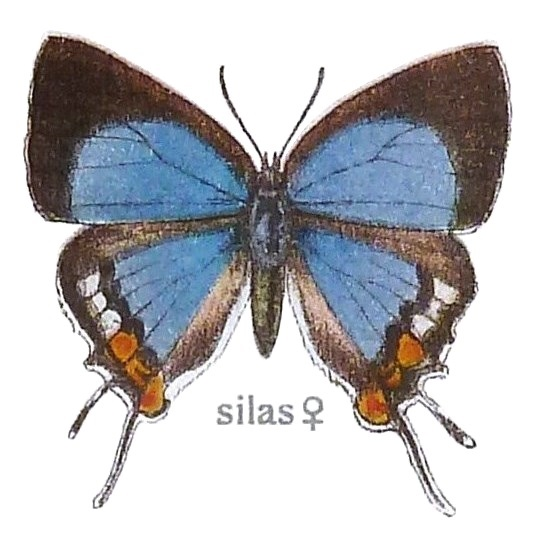

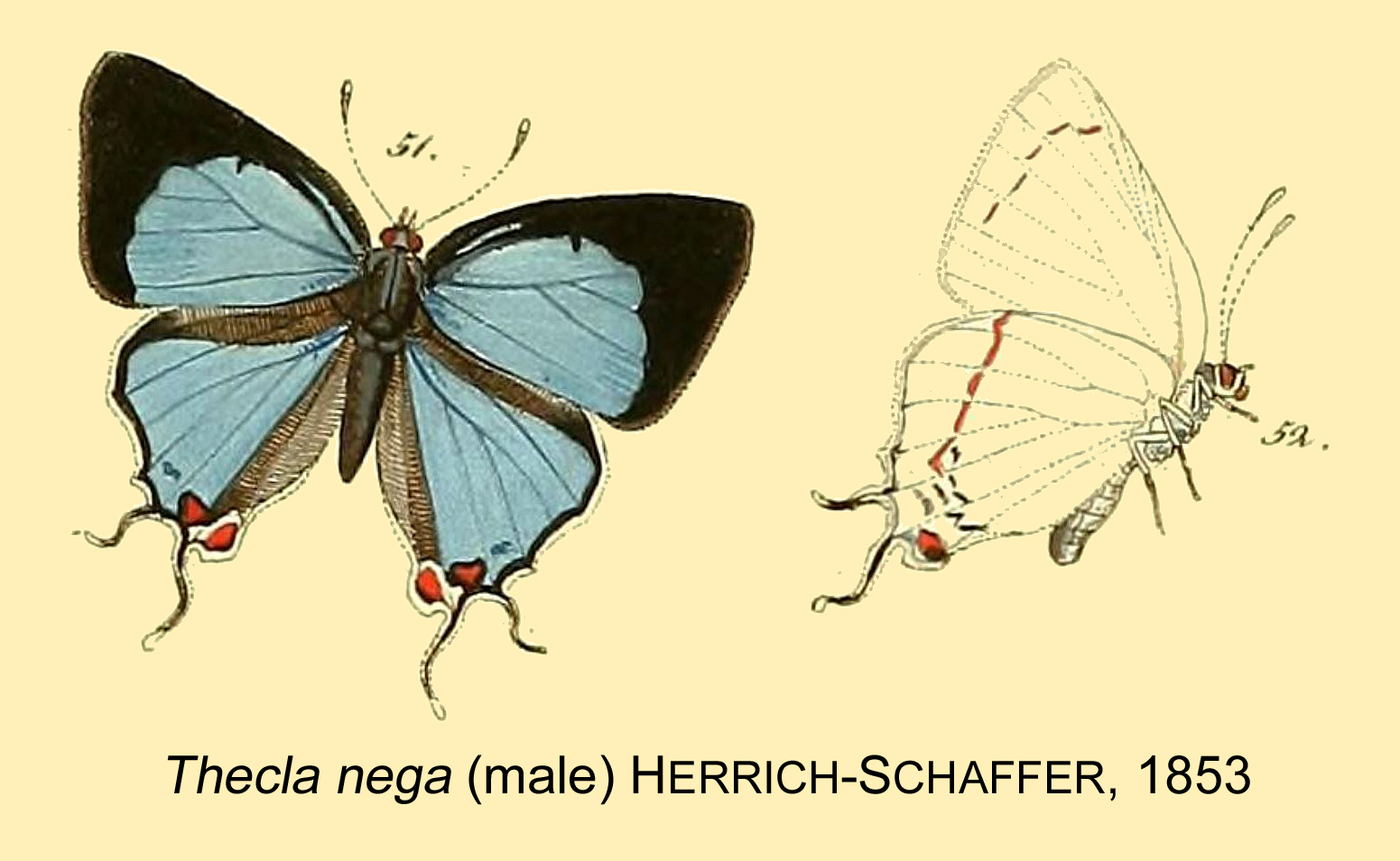
- Female and male

Conservation status
- Least Concern (IUCN 3.1)

Scientific classification
- Kingdom: Animalia
- Phylum: Arthropoda
- Class: Insecta
- Order: Lepidoptera
- Family: Lycaenidae
- Genus: Iolaus
- Species: I. silas

Binomial name
- Iolaus silas (Westwood, [1851])

Synonyms
- Anops silas Westwood, [1851]; Thecla nega Herrich-Schäffer, [1853]

= Iolaus silas =

Southern sapphire

Species of butterfly

Iolaus silas, the southern sapphire, is a butterfly of the family Lycaenidae which is endemic to South Africa.

== Range ==
It occurs from the southeastern Nama Karoo in the Eastern Cape (Somerset East and Bedford areas), and along the eastern littoral to northern KwaZulu-Natal. It is present in spekboomveld, coastal savannah and lowland forest.

== Description and biology ==
The wingspan is 32–37 mm for males and 34–41 mm for females. Adults are on wing year round in warmer areas and from September to January in the southern part of its range. The larvae feed on various mistletoes, namely Moquiniella rubra, Erianthemum dregei and Loranthus usuiensis.
