= Iolaus obscurus =

Scientific classification
- Kingdom: Animalia
- Phylum: Arthropoda
- Class: Insecta
- Order: Lepidoptera
- Family: Lycaenidae
- Genus: Iolaus
- Species: I. obscurus

Binomial name
- Iolaus obscurus Aurivillius, 1923

Synonyms
- Iolaus (Epamera) obscurus; Iolaus yusuf Koçak, 1996 (superfluous replacement name)

Species of butterfly

Iolaus obscurus, the obscure sapphire, is a butterfly in the family Lycaenidae. It is found in northern Namibia. The habitat consists of dry savanna.

Adults have been recorded in December.

The larvae feed on Plicosepalus kalachariensis.
