= Iolaus lukabas =

- Seitz Fauna Africana as julius (e)

Scientific classification
- Kingdom: Animalia
- Phylum: Arthropoda
- Clade: Pancrustacea
- Class: Insecta
- Order: Lepidoptera
- Family: Lycaenidae
- Genus: Iolaus
- Species: I. lukabas

Binomial name
- Iolaus lukabas H. H. Druce, 1890

Synonyms
- Iolaus (Philiolaus) lukabas; Jolaus julius Staudinger, 1891; Argiolaus lekanion H. H. Druce, 1891

Species of butterfly

Iolaus lukabas, or Druce's sapphire, is a butterfly in the family Lycaenidae. The species was first described by Hamilton Herbert Druce in 1890. It is found in the Gambia, Sierra Leone, Ivory Coast, Ghana, Nigeria (south and the Cross River loop) and Cameroon. The habitat consists of gallery forests and dry forest.

The larvae feed on the flowers of Loranthus incanus and Phragmanthera capitata. They are green and resemble the flowers on which they feed.
