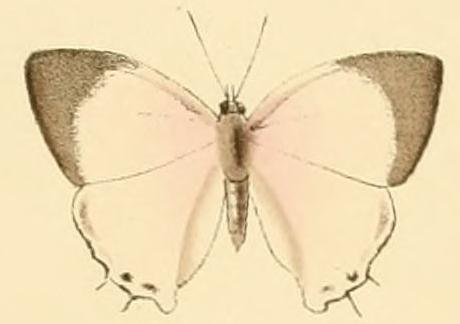

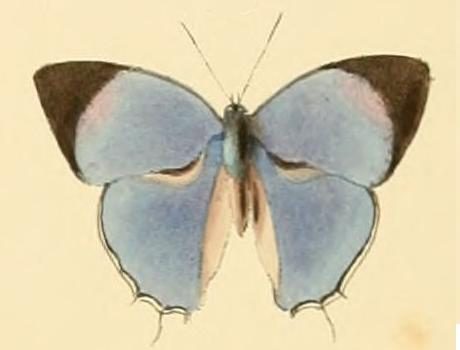

Scientific classification
- Kingdom: Animalia
- Phylum: Arthropoda
- Class: Insecta
- Order: Lepidoptera
- Family: Lycaenidae
- Genus: Iolaus
- Species: I. carina

Binomial name
- Iolaus carina Hewitson, 1873

Synonyms
- Iolaus (Iolaus) carina; Iolaus bolissus gabonensis Stempffer, 1951

= Iolaus carina =

Species of butterfly

Iolaus carina is a butterfly in the family Lycaenidae. It is found in Gabon.

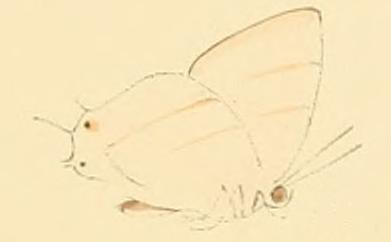
