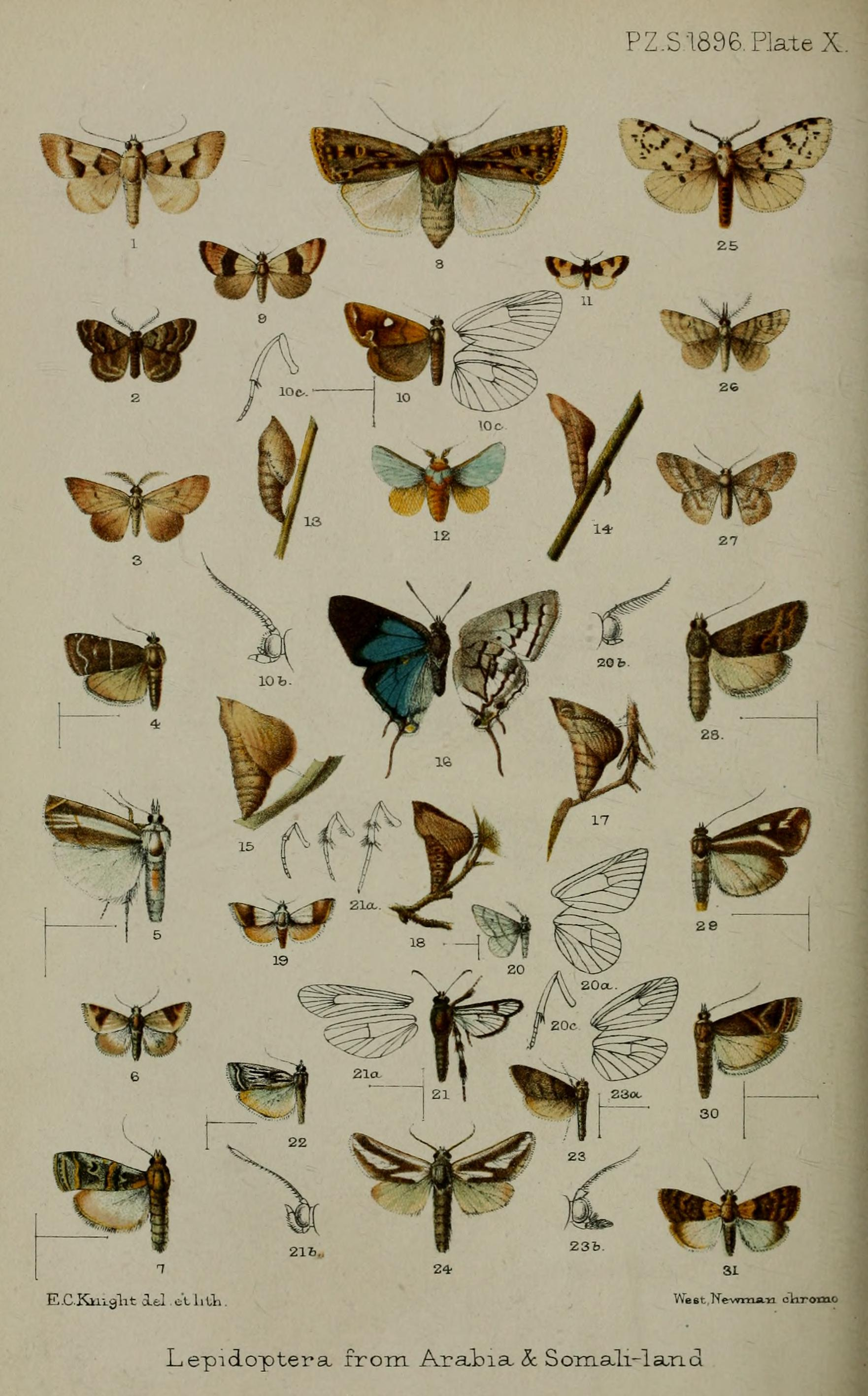
- Figure 16

Scientific classification
- Kingdom: Animalia
- Phylum: Arthropoda
- Class: Insecta
- Order: Lepidoptera
- Family: Lycaenidae
- Genus: Iolaus
- Species: I. nursei

Binomial name
- Iolaus nursei Butler, 1896

Synonyms
- Iolaus (Epamera) nursei

= Iolaus nursei =

Species of butterfly

Iolaus nursei is a butterfly in the family Lycaenidae. It is found in south-western Saudi Arabia and Yemen.
