= Iolaus agnes =

Scientific classification
- Kingdom: Animalia
- Phylum: Arthropoda
- Class: Insecta
- Order: Lepidoptera
- Family: Lycaenidae
- Genus: Iolaus
- Species: I. agnes

Binomial name
- Iolaus agnes Aurivillius, 1898

Synonyms
- Iolaus (Epamera) agnes; Jolaus (Epamera) agnes

Species of butterfly

Iolaus agnes, the Agnes sapphire, is a butterfly in the family Lycaenidae. It is found in Nigeria (the Cross River loop), Cameroon, the Republic of the Congo and the Democratic Republic of the Congo (Uele and Tshopo). The habitat consists of wet forests.
