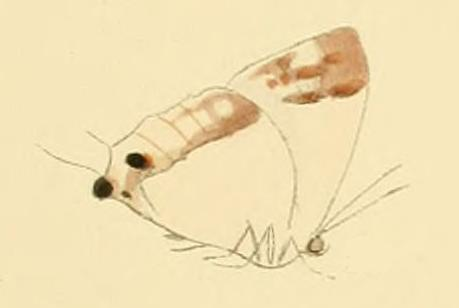

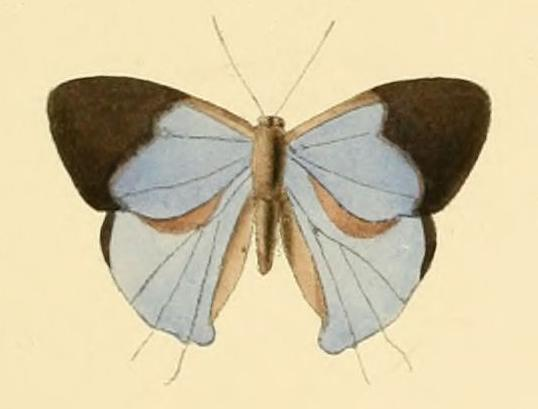

Conservation status
- Least Concern (IUCN 3.1)

Scientific classification
- Kingdom: Animalia
- Phylum: Arthropoda
- Class: Insecta
- Order: Lepidoptera
- Family: Lycaenidae
- Genus: Iolaus
- Species: I. creta

Binomial name
- Iolaus creta Hewitson, 1878

Synonyms
- Iolaus (Epamera) creta Hewitson, 1878; Epamera fuscomarginata Joicey and Talbot, 1921; Iolaus alberici Dufrane, 1945

= Iolaus creta =

Species of butterfly

Iolaus creta, the blotched sapphire, is a butterfly in the family Lycaenidae. It is found in Nigeria (the Cross River loop), Cameroon, Gabon, the Republic of the Congo, the Democratic Republic of the Congo (Tshopo and Kivu) and Uganda (western Bwamba). The habitat consists of forests.
