= Iolaus australis =

Scientific classification
- Kingdom: Animalia
- Phylum: Arthropoda
- Clade: Pancrustacea
- Class: Insecta
- Order: Lepidoptera
- Family: Lycaenidae
- Genus: Iolaus
- Species: I. australis

Binomial name
- Iolaus australis Stevenson, 1937

Synonyms
- Iolaus scintillans race australis Stevenson, 1937; Iolaus (Epamera) australis

Species of butterfly

Iolaus australis, the eastern sapphire, is a butterfly in the family Lycaenidae. It is found in Zambia and Zimbabwe. The habitat consists of Brachystegia woodland.

There are probably two generations per year, with adults on wing from June to September and again from February to April.

The larvae feed on the leaves of Tapinanthus oleifolius, Tapinanthus erianthus, Tapinanthus dependens, Agelanthus subulatus, Vanwykia rubella, Erianthemum dregei, Phragmanthera usuiensis usuiensis, Globimetula anguliflora, Globimetula braunii, Globimetula mweroensis and Helixanthera tetrapartita. They are dark grey brown.
