= Iolaus handmani =

Scientific classification
- Kingdom: Animalia
- Phylum: Arthropoda
- Class: Insecta
- Order: Lepidoptera
- Family: Lycaenidae
- Genus: Iolaus
- Species: I. handmani

Binomial name
- Iolaus handmani (Gifford, 1965)

Synonyms
- Epamera handmani Gifford, 1965; Iolaus (Epamera) handmani

Species of butterfly

Iolaus handmani is a butterfly in the family Lycaenidae. It is found in Malawi.
