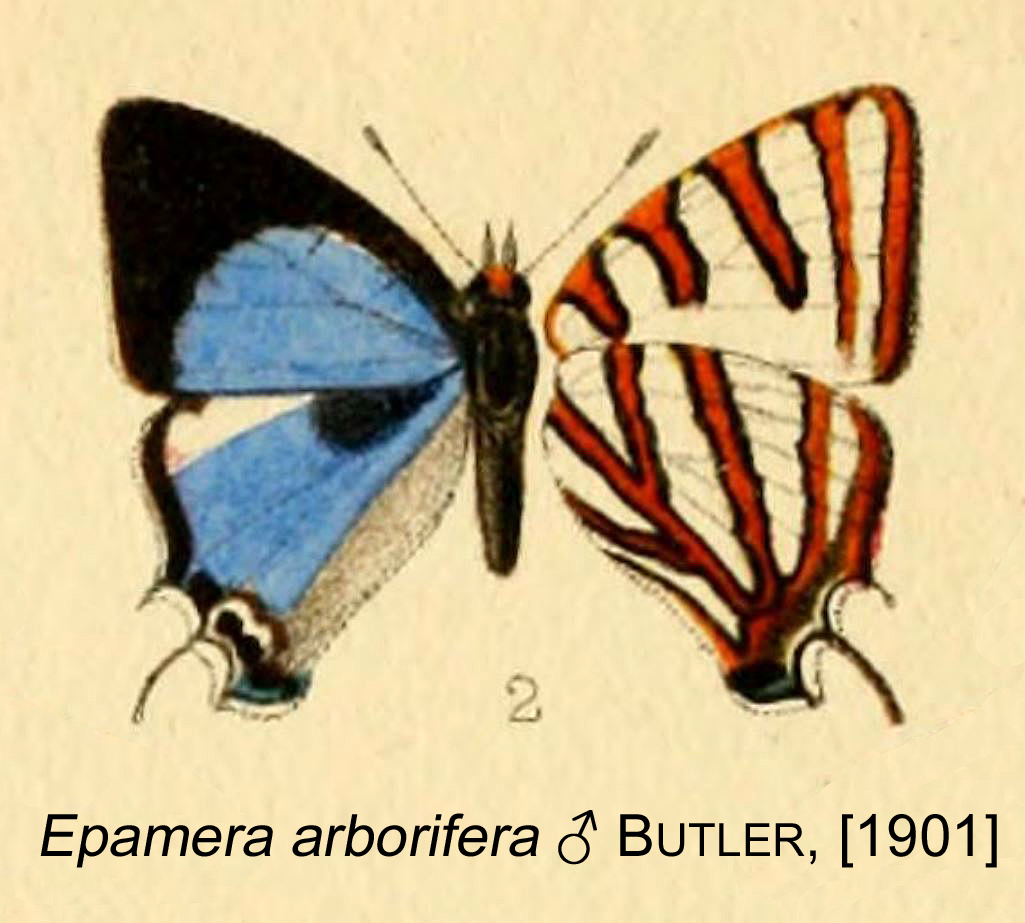
- male from original description

Conservation status
- Vulnerable (IUCN 3.1)

Scientific classification
- Kingdom: Animalia
- Phylum: Arthropoda
- Class: Insecta
- Order: Lepidoptera
- Family: Lycaenidae
- Genus: Iolaus
- Species: I. arborifera

Binomial name
- Iolaus arborifera (Butler, 1901)

Synonyms
- Epamera arborifera Butler, 1901; Iolaus (Epamera) arborifera

= Iolaus arborifera =

Species of butterfly

Iolaus arborifera is a butterfly in the family Lycaenidae. It is found in the highlands of Kenya. The habitat consists of montane forests.

The larvae feed on Englerina woodfordioides and Loranthus freisiorum.
