= Iolaus farquharsoni =

Scientific classification
- Kingdom: Animalia
- Phylum: Arthropoda
- Class: Insecta
- Order: Lepidoptera
- Family: Lycaenidae
- Genus: Iolaus
- Species: I. farquharsoni

Binomial name
- Iolaus farquharsoni (Bethune-Baker, 1922)

Synonyms
- Epamera farquharsoni Bethune-Baker, 1922; Iolaus (Epamera) farquharsoni

Species of butterfly

Iolaus farquharsoni, the Farquharson's sapphire, is a butterfly in the family Lycaenidae. It is found in Ghana, southern Nigeria, Cameroon, the Democratic Republic of the Congo, Uganda, north-western Tanzania and north-western Zambia. The habitat consists of open forests and secondary growth.

The larvae feed on the flowers of Loranthus incanus, Globimetula braunii and Globimetula anguliflora.
