= Iolaus longicauda =

Scientific classification
- Kingdom: Animalia
- Phylum: Arthropoda
- Class: Insecta
- Order: Lepidoptera
- Family: Lycaenidae
- Genus: Iolaus
- Species: I. longicauda

Binomial name
- Iolaus longicauda (Stempffer & Bennett, 1959)

Synonyms
- Epamera longicauda Stempffer & Bennett, 1959; Iolaus (Epamera) longicauda; Iolaus (Epamera) longicauda Collins & Larsen, 2000

Species of butterfly

Iolaus longicauda, the long-tailed sapphire, is a butterfly in the family Lycaenidae. It is found in Ivory Coast and Nigeria.

Adults have been recorded in August.

== Subspecies ==
- Iolaus longicauda longicauda (Nigeria: Cross River loop)
- Iolaus longicauda haydoni Collins & Larsen, 2000 (Ivory Coast)
