= Iolaus ofere =

Scientific classification
- Kingdom: Animalia
- Phylum: Arthropoda
- Clade: Pancrustacea
- Class: Insecta
- Order: Lepidoptera
- Family: Lycaenidae
- Genus: Iolaus
- Species: I. ofere

Binomial name
- Iolaus ofere Collins & Larsen, 2008

Species of butterfly

Iolaus ofere is a butterfly in the family Lycaenidae. It is found in Nigeria.
