= Iolaus cottrelli =

Scientific classification
- Kingdom: Animalia
- Phylum: Arthropoda
- Class: Insecta
- Order: Lepidoptera
- Family: Lycaenidae
- Genus: Iolaus
- Species: I. cottrelli

Binomial name
- Iolaus cottrelli (Stempffer & Bennett, 1958)

Synonyms
- Iolaphilus cottrelli Stempffer & Bennett, 1958; Iolaus (Argiolaus) cottrelli

Species of butterfly

Iolaus cottrelli, the Cottrell's sapphire, is a butterfly in the family Lycaenidae. It is found in Uganda, Kenya, Tanzania and Zambia.
