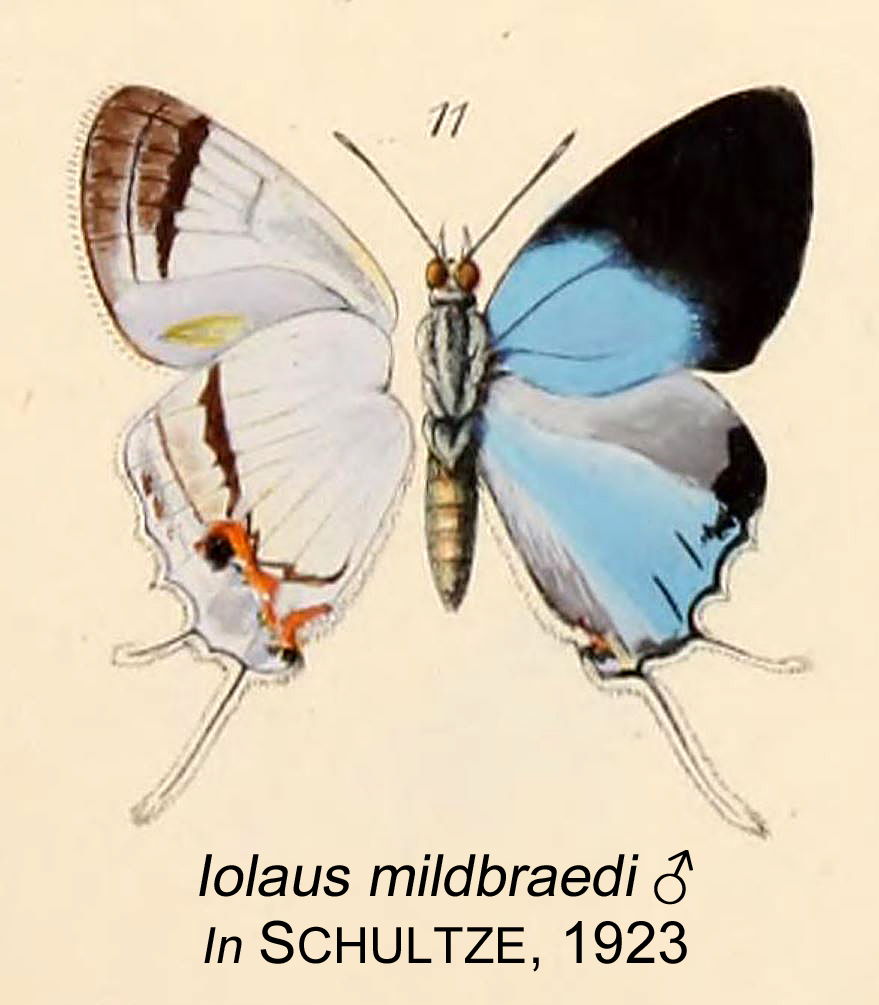

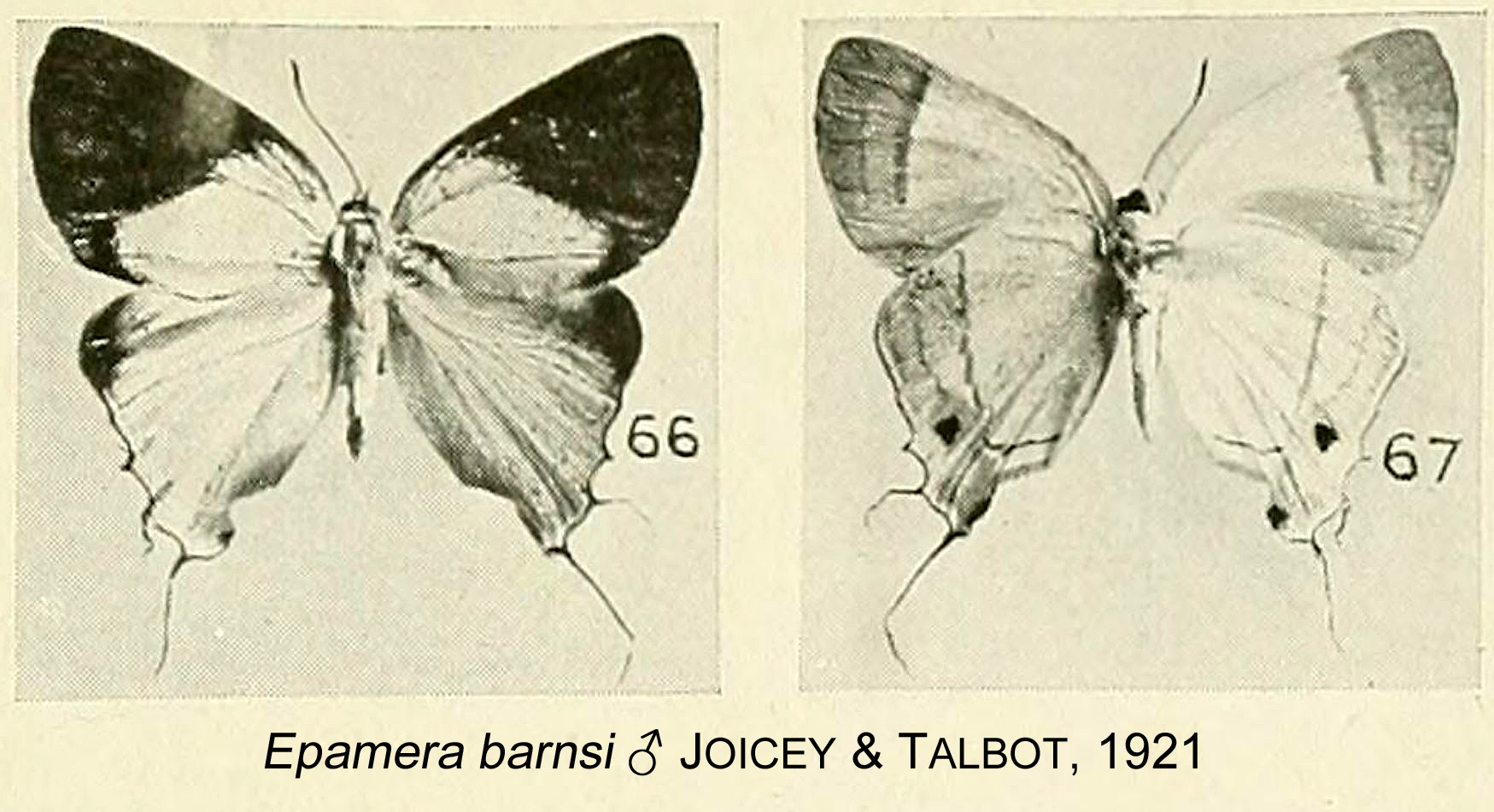

Conservation status
- Least Concern (IUCN 3.1)

Scientific classification
- Kingdom: Animalia
- Phylum: Arthropoda
- Class: Insecta
- Order: Lepidoptera
- Family: Lycaenidae
- Genus: Iolaus
- Species: I. hemicyanus

Binomial name
- Iolaus hemicyanus Sharpe, 1904

Synonyms
- Iolaus (Epamera) hemicyanus; Jolaus bryki Aurivillius, 1925; Epamera barbara toroensis Riley, 1929; Jolaus barbara Suffert, 1904; Jolaus mildbraedi Schultze, 1912; Epamera yokoana Bethune-Baker, 1926; Epamera barnsi Joicey & Talbot, 1921

= Iolaus hemicyanus =

Species of butterfly

Iolaus hemicyanus is a butterfly in the family Lycaenidae. It is found in Cameroon, Equatorial Guinea (Bioko), the Republic of the Congo, the Democratic Republic of the Congo, Uganda, Kenya and Tanzania. The habitat consists of forests.

The larvae feed on Globimetula braunii and Phragmananthera usuiensis.

== Subspecies ==
- Iolaus hemicyanus hemicyanus (Uganda, western Kenya, north-western Tanzania)
- Iolaus hemicyanus barbara Suffert, 1904 (Cameroon, Equatorial Guinea)
- Iolaus hemicyanus barnsi (Joicey & Talbot, 1921) (Republic of the Congo, Democratic Republic of the Congo: Uele, Tshopo, Kivu, Maniema, Sankuru and Lualaba)
