= Iolaus parasilanus =

Scientific classification
- Kingdom: Animalia
- Phylum: Arthropoda
- Clade: Pancrustacea
- Class: Insecta
- Order: Lepidoptera
- Family: Lycaenidae
- Genus: Iolaus
- Species: I. parasilanus

Binomial name
- Iolaus parasilanus Rebel, 1914

Synonyms
- Iolaus (Philiolaus) parasilanus; Argiolaus parasilanus divaricatus Riley, 1928; Argiolaus parasilanus mabillei Riley, 1928; Iolaphilus parasilanus maesseni Stempffer & Bennett, 1958

Species of butterfly

Iolaus parasilanus, the friendly sapphire, is a butterfly in the family Lycaenidae. It is found in Ghana, Nigeria, Gabon, the Republic of the Congo, Angola, the Democratic Republic of the Congo, Uganda, Kenya and Tanzania. The habitat consists of forests.

The larvae feed on Loranthus species, Phragmanthera usuiensis usuiensis, Phragmanthera polycrypta and Phragmanthera brieyi.

== Subspecies ==
- Iolaus parasilanus parasilanus (Democratic Republic of the Congo: South Kivu, western Tanzania)
- Iolaus parasilanus divaricatus (Riley, 1928) (Uganda, western Kenya, north-western Tanzania, Democratic Republic of Congo: Uele, Ituri, North Kivu and Tshopo)
- Iolaus parasilanus mabillei (Riley, 1928) (Gabon, Congo, Angola: Cabinda, Democratic Republic of the Congo: Equateur)
- Iolaus parasilanus maesseni (Stempffer & Bennett, 1958) (Ghana, Nigeria: south and the Cross River loop)

Torben Larsen developed a species numbering system for his 2005 publication Butterflies of West Africa. The subspecies maesseni is #401. The 'Larsen' numbers have since been used with permission in A Sharp Eye on Butterflies of Ghana.
