= Iolaus newporti =

Conservation status
- Data Deficient (IUCN 3.1)

Scientific classification
- Kingdom: Animalia
- Phylum: Arthropoda
- Class: Insecta
- Order: Lepidoptera
- Family: Lycaenidae
- Genus: Iolaus
- Species: I. newporti

Binomial name
- Iolaus newporti Larsen, 1994

Synonyms
- Iolaus (Philiolaus) newporti

Species of butterfly

Iolaus newporti, the Newport's sapphire, is a butterfly in the family Lycaenidae. It is found in western Nigeria. The habitat consists of dry savanna.

Adults are on wing in April and May.
