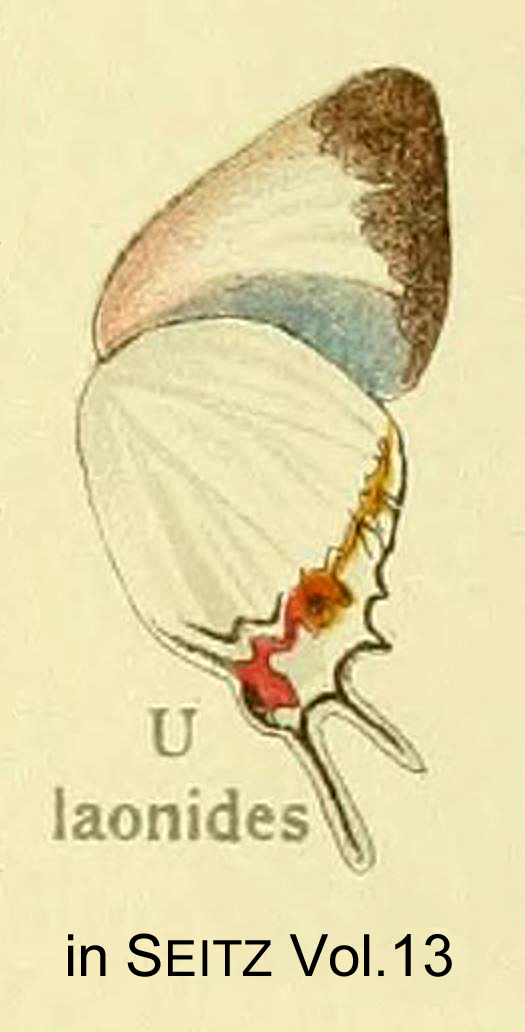

Conservation status
- Least Concern (IUCN 3.1)

Scientific classification
- Kingdom: Animalia
- Phylum: Arthropoda
- Clade: Pancrustacea
- Class: Insecta
- Order: Lepidoptera
- Family: Lycaenidae
- Genus: Iolaus
- Species: I. laonides

Binomial name
- Iolaus laonides Aurivillius, 1898

Synonyms
- Iolaus (Epamera) laonides Aurivillius, 1898; Iolaus (Philiolaus) laonides

= Iolaus laonides =

Species of butterfly

Iolaus laonides, the emerald sapphire, is a butterfly in the family Lycaenidae. It is found in Sierra Leone, Ivory Coast, Ghana, Nigeria (east and the Cross River loop) and Cameroon. The habitat consist of forests.
