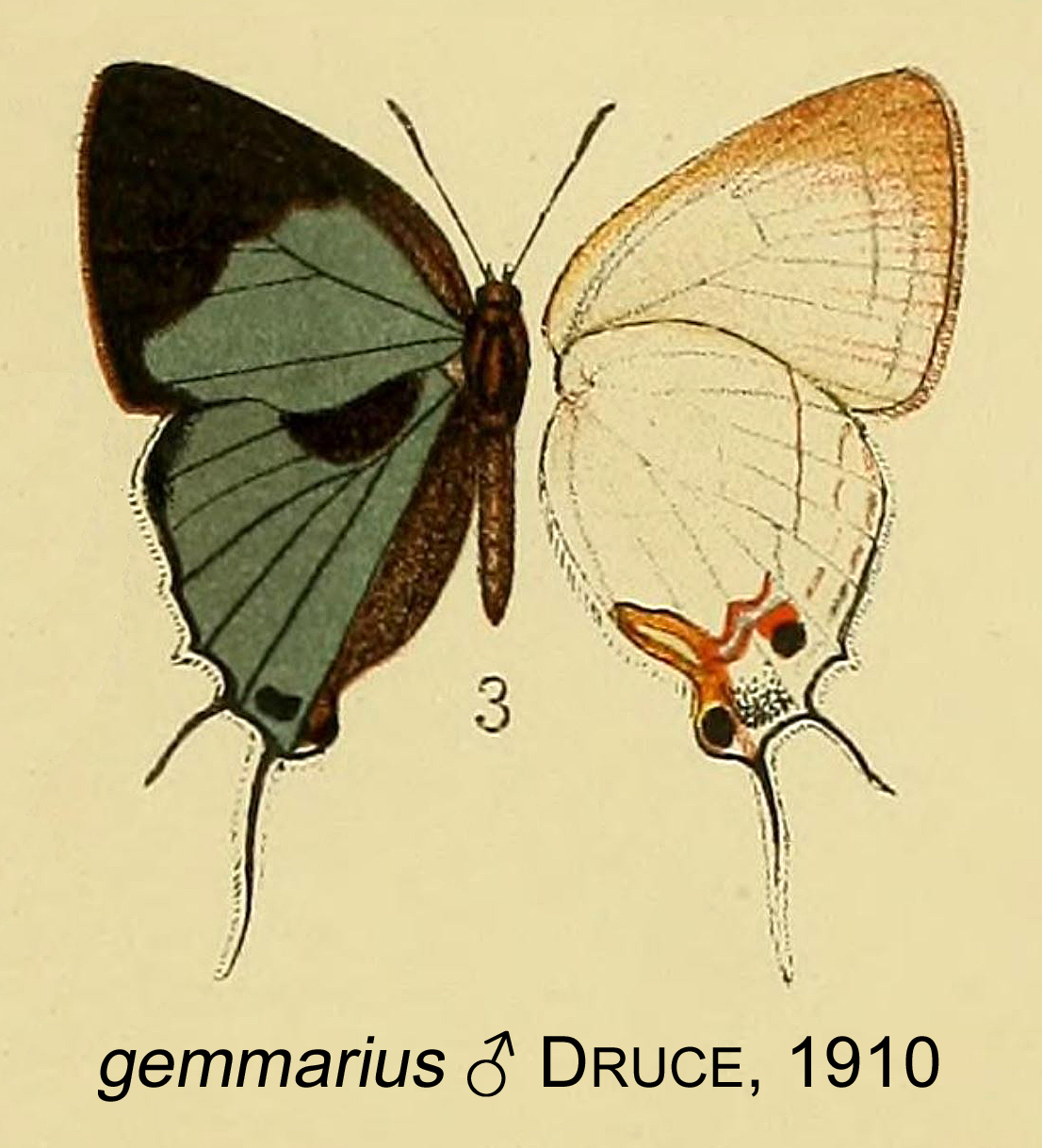

Scientific classification
- Kingdom: Animalia
- Phylum: Arthropoda
- Class: Insecta
- Order: Lepidoptera
- Family: Lycaenidae
- Genus: Iolaus
- Species: I. gemmarius

Binomial name
- Iolaus gemmarius (H. H. Druce, 1910)

Synonyms
- Epamera gemmarius H. H. Druce, 1910; Iolaus (Epamera) gemmarius

= Iolaus gemmarius =

Small jewel sapphire

Species of butterfly

Iolaus gemmarius, the small jewel sapphire, is a butterfly in the family Lycaenidae. The species was first described by Hamilton Herbert Druce in 1910. It is found in Nigeria (south and the Cross River loop) and Cameroon. The habitat consists of forests.
