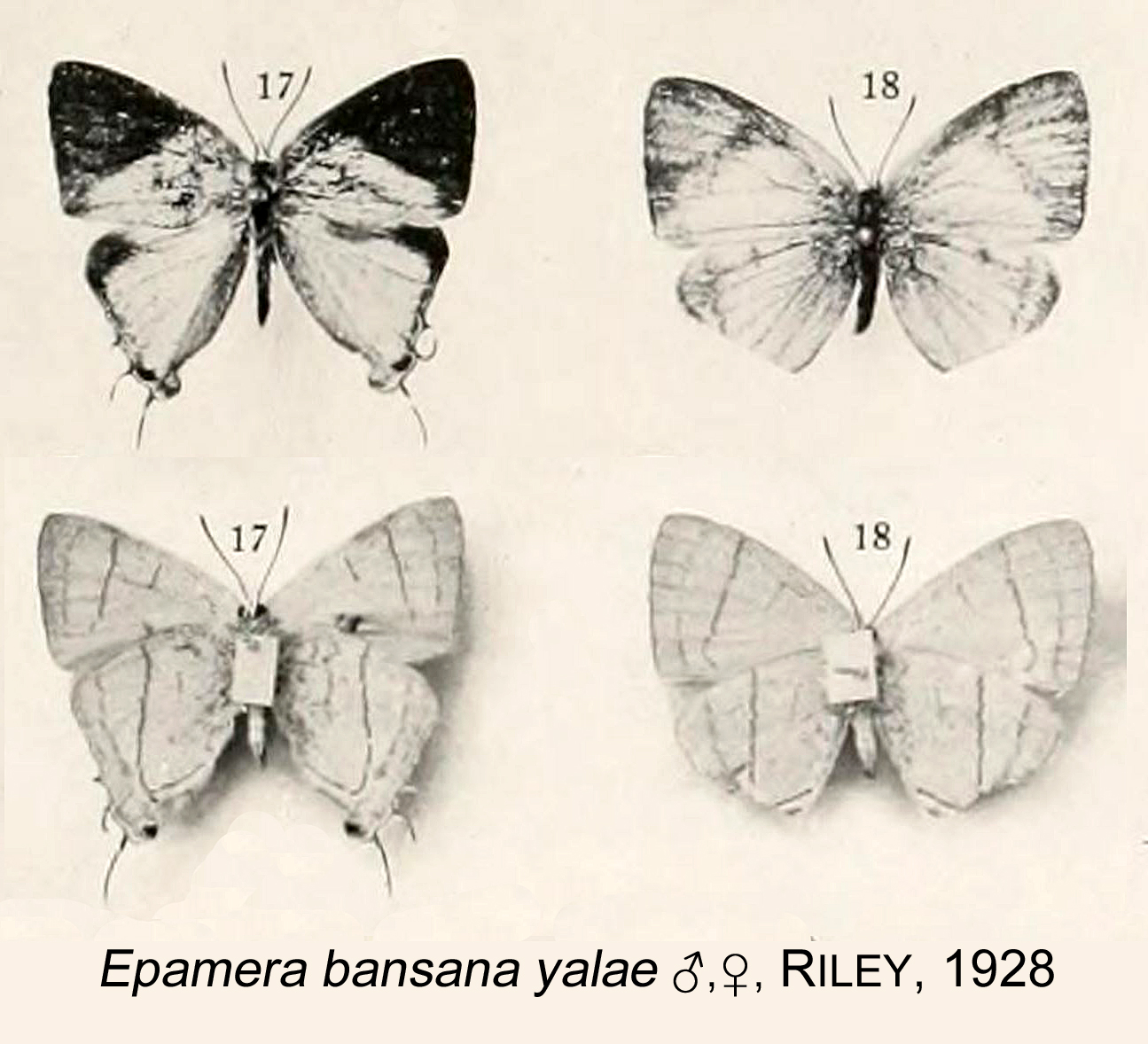

Scientific classification
- Kingdom: Animalia
- Phylum: Arthropoda
- Class: Insecta
- Order: Lepidoptera
- Family: Lycaenidae
- Genus: Iolaus
- Species: I. bansana

Binomial name
- Iolaus bansana Bethune-Baker, 1926

Synonyms
- Iolaus (Epamera) bansana; Epamera bansana yalae Riley, 1928

= Iolaus bansana =

Species of butterfly

Iolaus bansana is a butterfly in the family Lycaenidae. It is found in Cameroon, Uganda and Kenya. The habitat consists of forests.

The larvae feed on Englerina woodfordioides and Oncocalyx fischeri.

== Subspecies ==
- Iolaus bansana bansana (Cameroon)
- Iolaus bansana yalae (Riley, 1928) (western Kenya, eastern Uganda)
