= Iolaus henryi =

Scientific classification
- Kingdom: Animalia
- Phylum: Arthropoda
- Class: Insecta
- Order: Lepidoptera
- Family: Lycaenidae
- Genus: Iolaus
- Species: I. henryi

Binomial name
- Iolaus henryi (Stempffer, 1961)

Synonyms
- Iolaphilus henryi Stempffer, 1961

Species of butterfly

Iolaus henryi is a butterfly in the family Lycaenidae. It is found in south-western Uganda and Tanzania. The habitat consists of forest.
