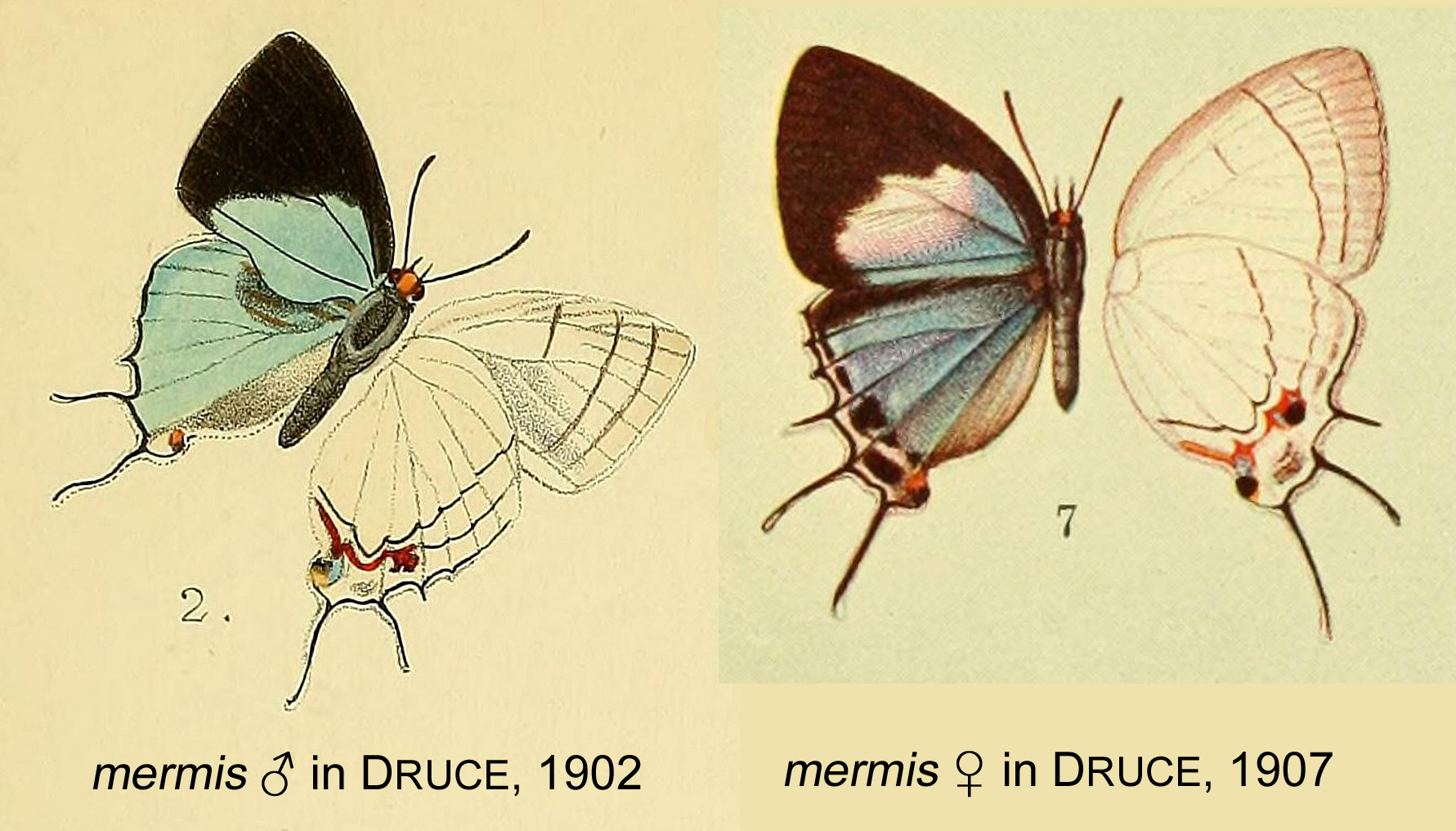

Scientific classification
- Kingdom: Animalia
- Phylum: Arthropoda
- Class: Insecta
- Order: Lepidoptera
- Family: Lycaenidae
- Genus: Iolaus
- Species: I. mermis

Binomial name
- Iolaus mermis (H. H. Druce, 1896)

Synonyms
- Epamera mermis H. H. Druce, 1896; Iolaus (Epamera) mermis

= Iolaus mermis =

Species of butterfly

Iolaus mermis is a butterfly in the family Lycaenidae first described by Hamilton Herbert Druce in 1896. It is found in Kenya (from the coast to Meru) and Tanzania (from the northern coast to Amani). The habitat consists of forests.

The larvae feed on Helixanthera verruculosa, Oncella ambigua, Agelanthus sansibarensis and Agelanthus subulatus.
