= Iolaus stewarti =

Scientific classification
- Kingdom: Animalia
- Phylum: Arthropoda
- Clade: Pancrustacea
- Class: Insecta
- Order: Lepidoptera
- Family: Lycaenidae
- Genus: Iolaus
- Species: I. stewarti

Binomial name
- Iolaus stewarti Heath, 1985

Synonyms
- Iolaus (Argiolaus) stewarti

Species of butterfly

Iolaus stewarti is a butterfly in the family Lycaenidae. It is found in north-eastern Zambia. The habitat consists of montane areas.

The larvae feed on Phragmanthera usuiensis usuiensis and Erianthemum schelei.
