= Iolaus poecilaon =

Scientific classification
- Kingdom: Animalia
- Phylum: Arthropoda
- Class: Insecta
- Order: Lepidoptera
- Family: Lycaenidae
- Genus: Iolaus
- Species: I. poecilaon

Binomial name
- Iolaus poecilaon (Riley, 1928)

Synonyms
- Argiolaus poecilaon Riley, 1928; Iolaus (Philiolaus) poecilaon; Iolaus (Argiolaus) poecilaon fisheri Heath, 1983

Species of butterfly

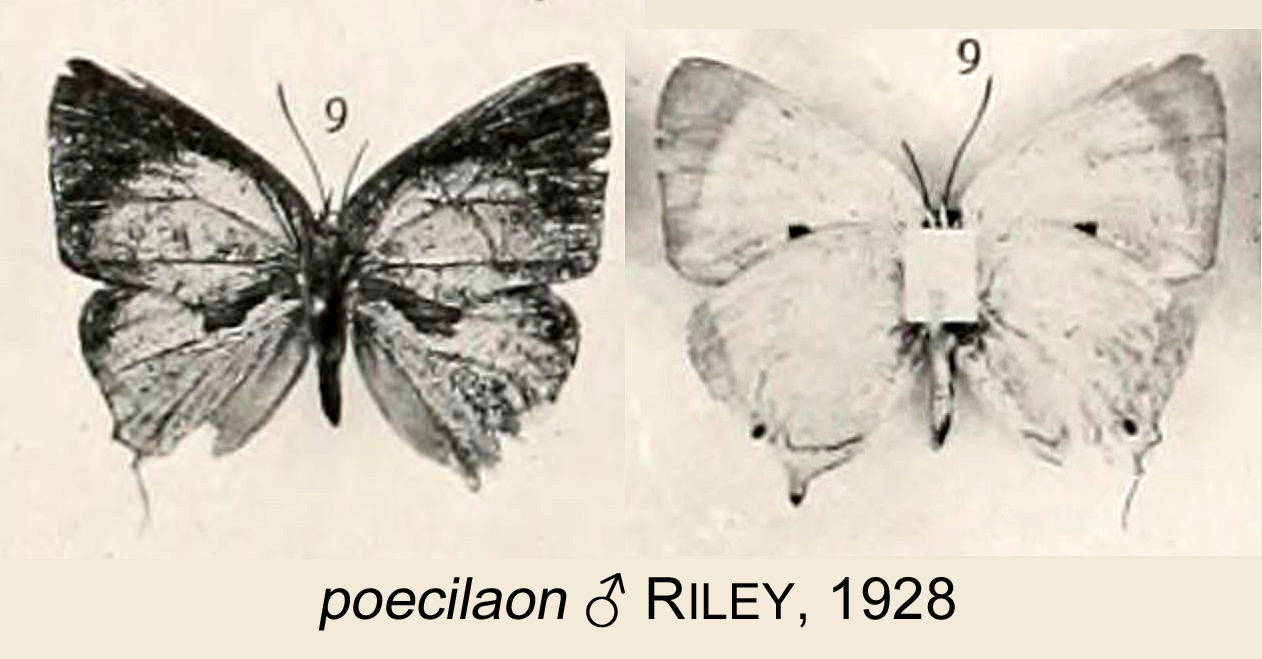

Iolaus poecilaon, the intense sapphire, is a butterfly in the family Lycaenidae. It is found in Nigeria, Cameroon, the Republic of the Congo, the Democratic Republic of the Congo, Uganda, Tanzania and Zambia. The habitat consists of forests.

The larvae feed on Phragmanthera rufescens, Phragmanthera usuiensis usuiensis, Phragmanthera polycrypta and Phragmanthera brieyi.

== Subspecies ==
- Iolaus poecilaon poecilaon (Nigeria: the Cross River loop, Cameroon, Congo, Uganda, north-western Tanzania, Democratic Republic of Congo: Uele, Kinshasa and Lualaba)
- Iolaus poecilaon fisheri Heath, 1983 (north-western Zambia)
