= Iolaus mane =

Scientific classification
- Kingdom: Animalia
- Phylum: Arthropoda
- Clade: Pancrustacea
- Class: Insecta
- Order: Lepidoptera
- Family: Lycaenidae
- Genus: Iolaus
- Species: I. mane

Binomial name
- Iolaus mane Collins & Larsen, 2003

Synonyms
- Iolaus (Philiolaus) mane

Species of butterfly

Iolaus mane, the Labe sapphire, is a butterfly in the family Lycaenidae. It is found in Guinea and Ghana.
