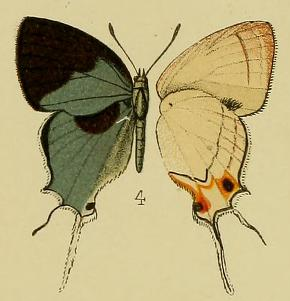
- Horace Knight's illustration of a male accompanying Druce's description

Scientific classification
- Kingdom: Animalia
- Phylum: Arthropoda
- Class: Insecta
- Order: Lepidoptera
- Family: Lycaenidae
- Genus: Iolaus
- Species: I. neavei

Binomial name
- Iolaus neavei (H. H. Druce, 1910)

Synonyms
- Epamera neavei H. H. Druce, 1910; Iolaus (Epamera) neavei

= Iolaus neavei =

Species of butterfly

Iolaus neavei, or Neave's sapphire, is a butterfly in the family Lycaenidae. The species was first described by Hamilton Herbert Druce in 1910. It is found in Nigeria, Cameroon, the Republic of the Congo, the Democratic Republic of the Congo, Uganda and Tanzania. The habitat consists of forests.

The larvae feed on Agelanthus krausei.

== Subspecies ==
- Iolaus neavei neavei (Nigeria: Cross River loop, Cameroon, Congo, Democratic Republic of the Congo: Uele)
- Iolaus neavei katera Talbot, 1937 (Uganda: west to the western shores of Lake Victoria and the Bwamba Valley, north-western Tanzania)

== Etymology ==
The name honours Sheffield Airey Neave.
