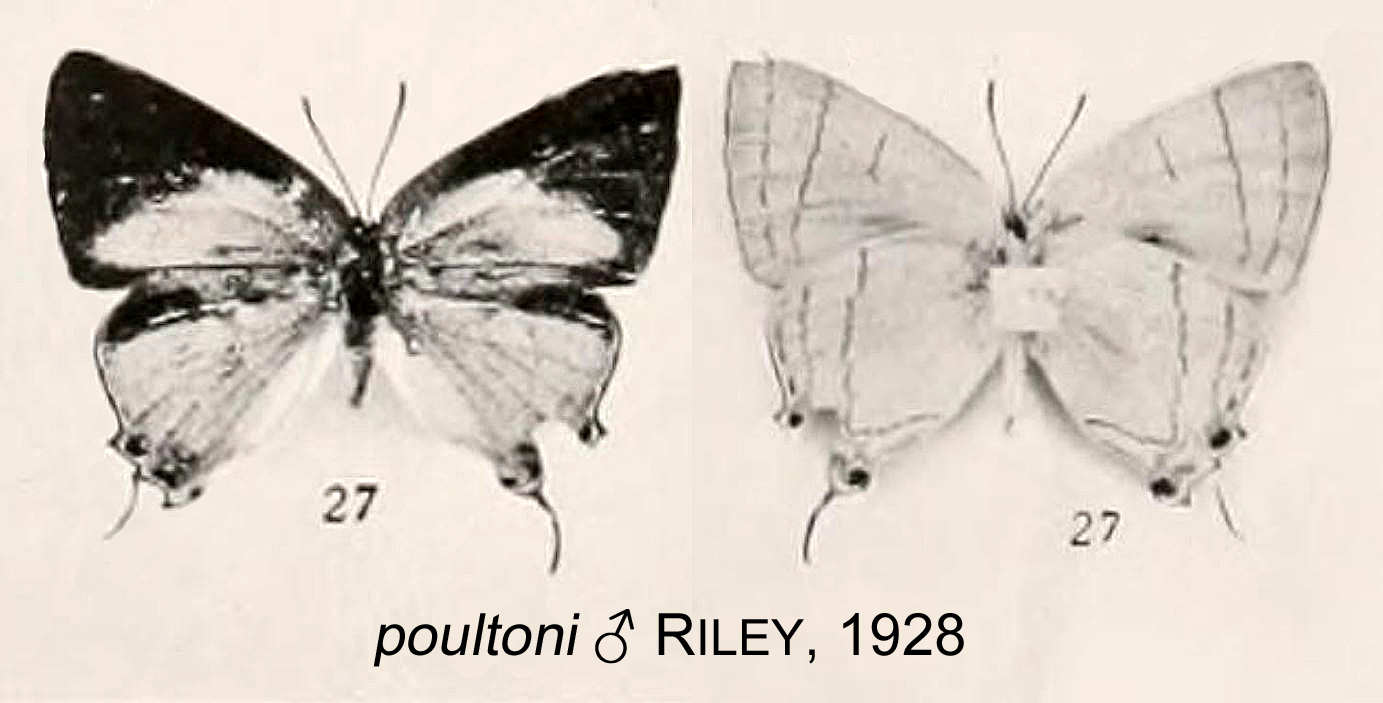

Scientific classification
- Kingdom: Animalia
- Phylum: Arthropoda
- Class: Insecta
- Order: Lepidoptera
- Family: Lycaenidae
- Genus: Iolaus
- Species: I. poultoni

Binomial name
- Iolaus poultoni (Riley, 1928)

Synonyms
- Pseudiolaus poultoni Riley, 1928; Iolaus (Pseudiolaus) poultoni

= Iolaus poultoni =

Species of butterfly

Iolaus poultoni, the Poulton's sapphire, is a butterfly in the family Lycaenidae. It is found along the coast of Kenya, eastern Zimbabwe and Mozambique. The habitat consists of forests.

The larvae feed on Agelanthus sansibarensis, Englerina macilenta, Englerina triplinervia, Helixanthera kirkii, Helixanthera tetrapartita and Loranthus recurviflora.
