= Iolaus mongiro =

Scientific classification
- Kingdom: Animalia
- Phylum: Arthropoda
- Clade: Pancrustacea
- Class: Insecta
- Order: Lepidoptera
- Family: Lycaenidae
- Genus: Iolaus
- Species: I. mongiro

Binomial name
- Iolaus mongiro Stempffer, 1969

Synonyms
- Iolaus (Epamera) mongiro

Species of butterfly

Iolaus mongiro is a butterfly in the family Lycaenidae. It is found in Uganda.
