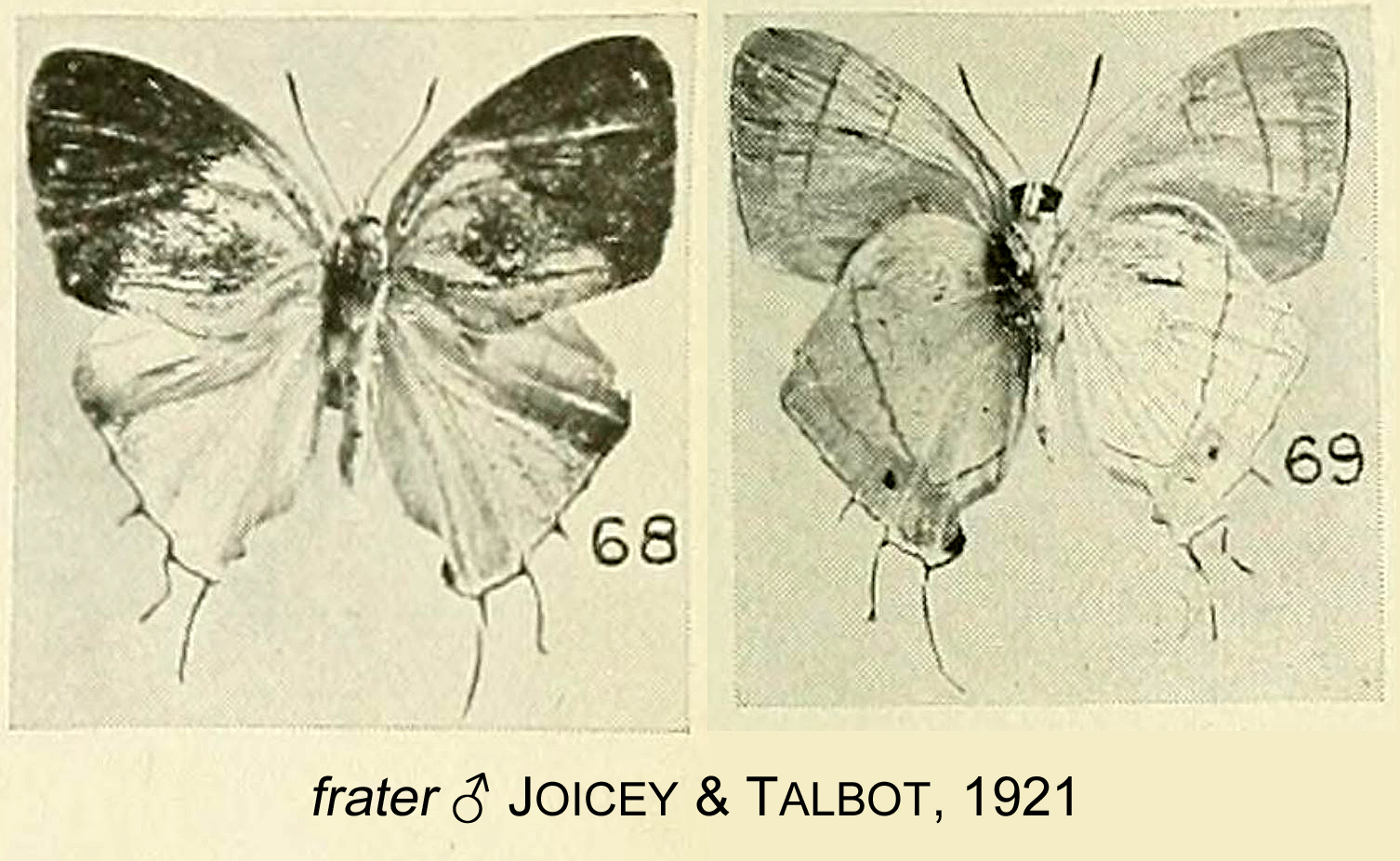

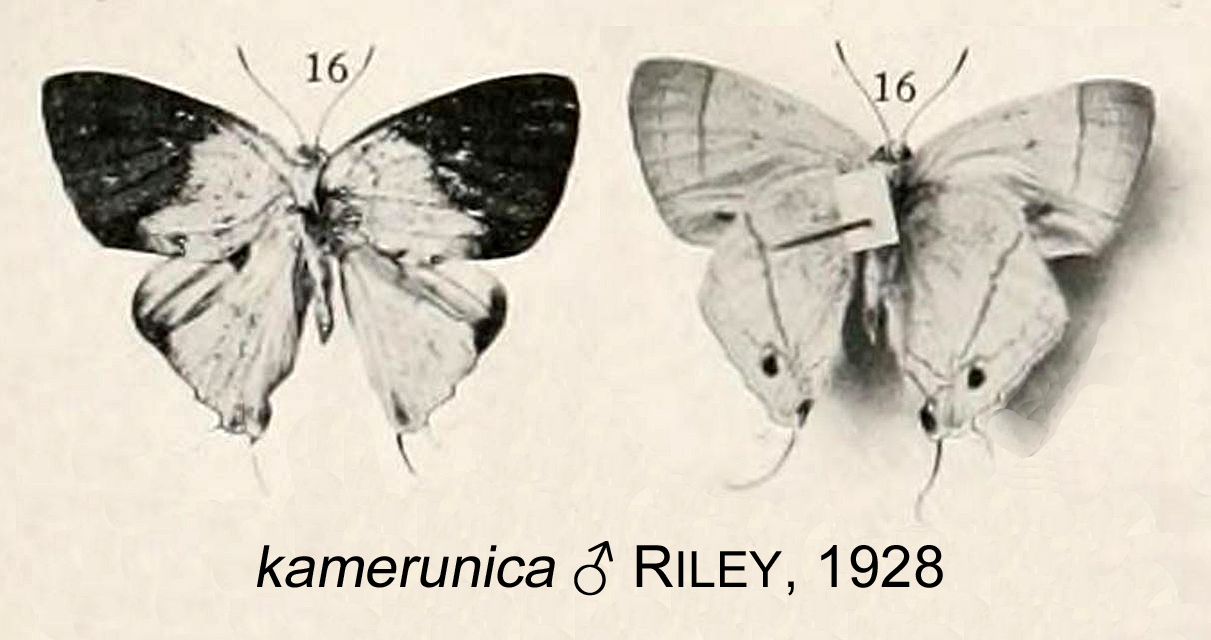

Scientific classification
- Kingdom: Animalia
- Phylum: Arthropoda
- Class: Insecta
- Order: Lepidoptera
- Family: Lycaenidae
- Genus: Iolaus
- Species: I. frater

Binomial name
- Iolaus frater (Joicey & Talbot, 1921)

Synonyms
- Epamera frater Joicey & Talbot, 1921; Iolaus (Epamera) frater; Epamera hemicyanus kamerunica Riley, 1928; Epamera kumboae Bethune-Baker, 1926

= Iolaus frater =

Species of butterfly

Iolaus frater, the brotherly sapphire, is a butterfly in the family Lycaenidae. It is found in Nigeria, Cameroon, Equatorial Guinea, the Republic of the Congo, the Democratic Republic of the Congo and Tanzania. The habitat consists of upland forests, just below the submontane level.

The larvae feed on Tapinanthus erectotruncatus and Tapinanthus dependens.

== Subspecies ==
- Iolaus frater frater (Republic of Congo, Tanzania, Democratic Republic of the Congo: Uele, Tshopo and North Kivu)
- Iolaus frater kamerunica (Riley, 1928) (Cameroon)
- Iolaus frater kumboae (Bethune-Baker, 1926) (eastern Nigeria, Bioko)
