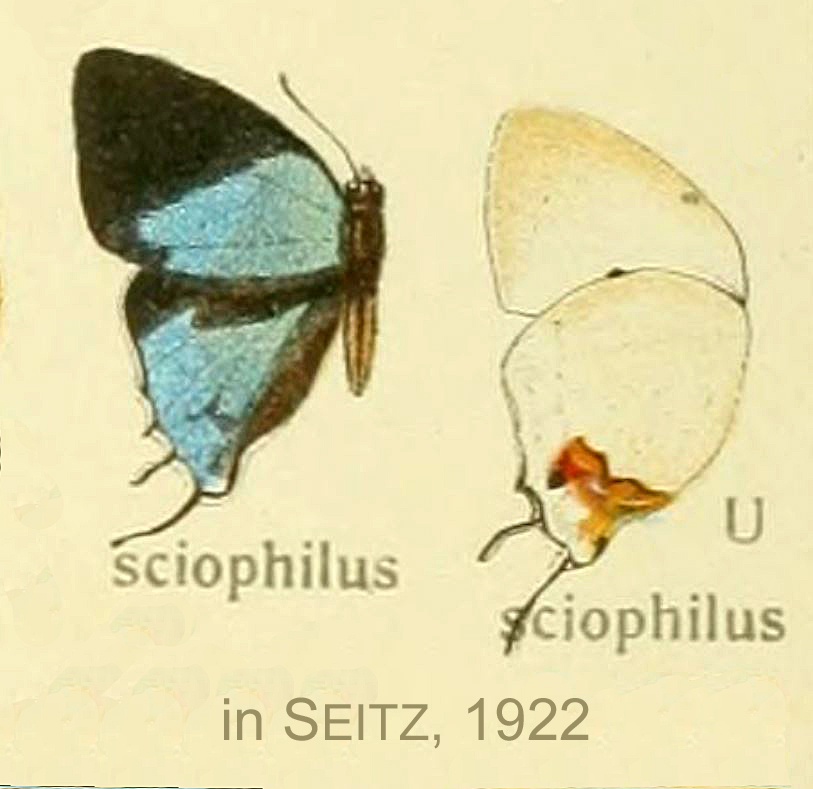

Conservation status
- Least Concern (IUCN 3.1)

Scientific classification
- Kingdom: Animalia
- Phylum: Arthropoda
- Clade: Pancrustacea
- Class: Insecta
- Order: Lepidoptera
- Family: Lycaenidae
- Genus: Iolaus
- Species: I. sciophilus

Binomial name
- Iolaus sciophilus (Schultze, 1916)

Synonyms
- Epamera sciophilus Schultze, 1916; Iolaus (Epamera) sciophilus

= Iolaus sciophilus =

Species of butterfly

Iolaus sciophilus, the dark jewel sapphire, is a butterfly in the family Lycaenidae. It is found in Nigeria (Cross River loop) and western Cameroon. The habitat consists of forests.

The larvae feed on Globimetula braunii.
