= Iolaus bamptoni =

Scientific classification
- Kingdom: Animalia
- Phylum: Arthropoda
- Class: Insecta
- Order: Lepidoptera
- Family: Lycaenidae
- Genus: Iolaus
- Species: I. bamptoni

Binomial name
- Iolaus bamptoni (Congdon & Collins, 1998)

Synonyms
- Epamera bamptoni Congdon and Collins, 1998; Iolaus (Epamera) bamptoni

Species of butterfly

Iolaus bamptoni is a butterfly in the family Lycaenidae. It is found in Tanzania. The habitat consists of degraded Acacia woodland.

Adults are on wing from January to May.

The larvae feed on Helixanthera tetrapartita.
