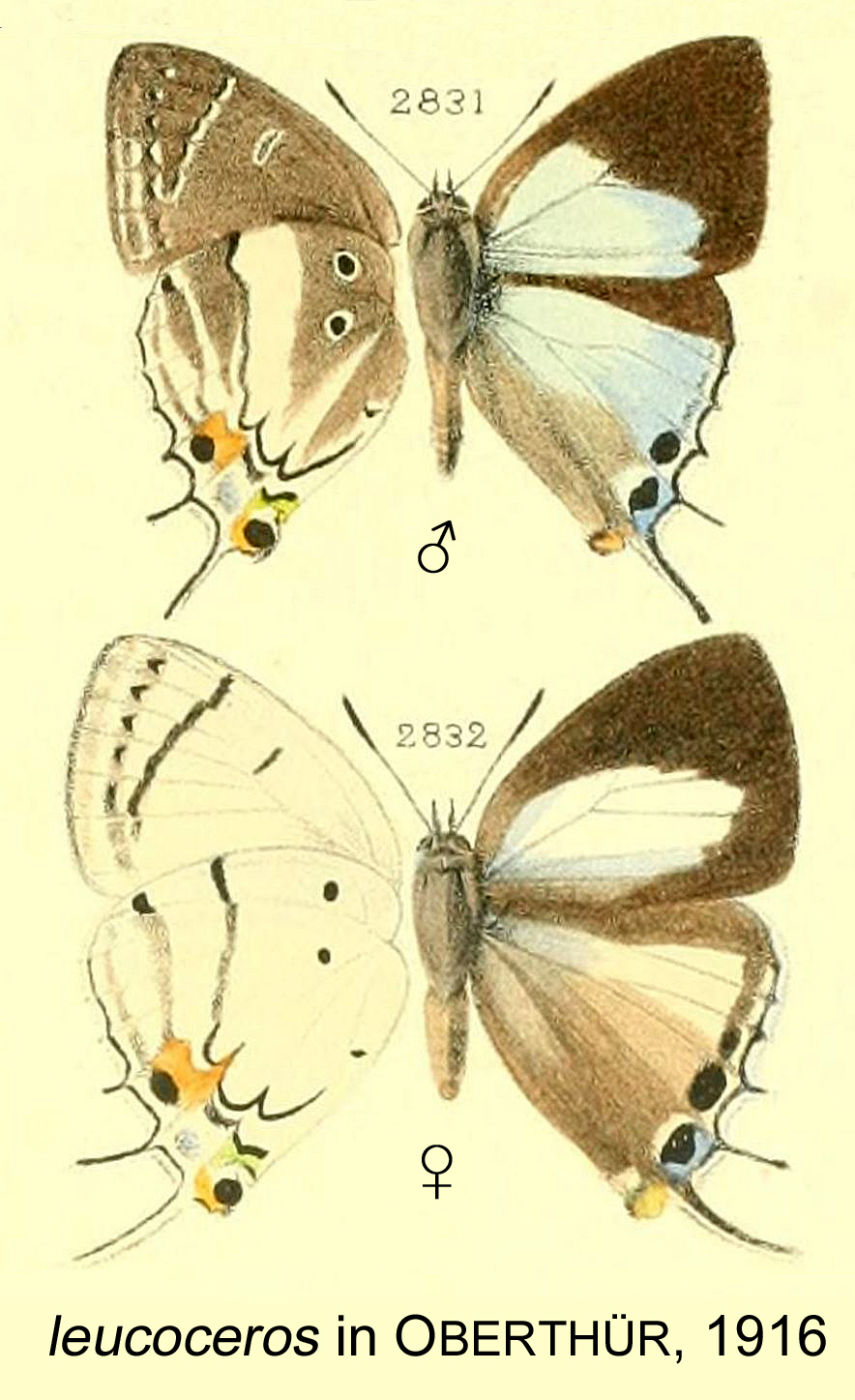

Scientific classification
- Kingdom: Animalia
- Phylum: Arthropoda
- Class: Insecta
- Order: Lepidoptera
- Family: Lycaenidae
- Genus: Iolaus
- Species: I. argentarius

Binomial name
- Iolaus argentarius Butler, 1879

Synonyms
- Iolaus (Trichiolaus) argentarius; Hypolycaena leucoceros Oberthür, 1916

= Iolaus argentarius =

Species of butterfly

Iolaus argentarius is a butterfly in the family Lycaenidae. It is found on Madagascar. The habitat consists of forests.
