= Iolaus djaloni =

Conservation status
- Data Deficient (IUCN 3.1)

Scientific classification
- Kingdom: Animalia
- Phylum: Arthropoda
- Class: Insecta
- Order: Lepidoptera
- Family: Lycaenidae
- Genus: Iolaus
- Species: I. djaloni

Binomial name
- Iolaus djaloni Collins & Larsen, 1998

Synonyms
- Iolaus (Epamera) djaloni

Species of butterfly

Iolaus djaloni, the Fouta Djalon sapphire, is a butterfly in the family Lycaenidae. It is found in Guinea. The habitat consists of dry forests.

Adults have been recorded on wing in October and December.
