= Iolaus vansomereni =

Scientific classification
- Kingdom: Animalia
- Phylum: Arthropoda
- Class: Insecta
- Order: Lepidoptera
- Family: Lycaenidae
- Genus: Iolaus
- Species: I. vansomereni

Binomial name
- Iolaus vansomereni (Stempffer & Bennett, 1958)

Synonyms
- Iolaphilus vansomereni Stempffer & Bennett, 1958; Iolaus (Philiolaus) vansomereni

Species of butterfly

Iolaus vansomereni is a butterfly in the family Lycaenidae. It is found in north-western Uganda. The habitat consists of savanna.
