= Iolaus dubiosa =

Scientific classification
- Kingdom: Animalia
- Phylum: Arthropoda
- Class: Insecta
- Order: Lepidoptera
- Family: Lycaenidae
- Genus: Iolaus
- Species: I. dubiosa

Binomial name
- Iolaus dubiosa (Stempffer & Bennett, 1959)

Synonyms
- Epamera dubiosa Stempffer & Bennett, 1959; Iolaus (Epamera) dubiosa

Species of butterfly

Iolaus dubiosa is a butterfly in the family Lycaenidae. It is found in Tanzania (the Usambara Mountains) and Zambia. The habitat consists of montane forest margins at altitudes between 1,900 and 2,000 metres.

The larvae feed on Phragmanthera usuiensis sigensis, Erianthemum schelei, Oedina pendens and Englerina inaequilatera.
