= Iolaus pamae =

Scientific classification
- Kingdom: Animalia
- Phylum: Arthropoda
- Class: Insecta
- Order: Lepidoptera
- Family: Lycaenidae
- Genus: Iolaus
- Species: I. pamae

Binomial name
- Iolaus pamae Heath, 1994

Synonyms
- Iolaus (Argiolaus) pamae; Iolaus pamelae Heath, 1994 (misspelling)

Species of butterfly

Iolaus pamae is a butterfly in the family Lycaenidae. It is found in north-eastern Zambia and western Tanzania.

The larvae feed on Phragmanthera usuiensis usuiensis, Phragmanthera eminii and Phragmanthera proteicola.
