= Iolaus kayonza =

Scientific classification
- Kingdom: Animalia
- Phylum: Arthropoda
- Clade: Pancrustacea
- Class: Insecta
- Order: Lepidoptera
- Family: Lycaenidae
- Genus: Iolaus
- Species: I. kayonza

Binomial name
- Iolaus kayonza (Stempffer & Bennett, 1958)

Synonyms
- Iolaphilus kayonza Stempffer & Bennett, 1958; Iolaus (Argiolaus) kayonza

Species of butterfly

Iolaus kayonza is a butterfly in the family Lycaenidae. It is found in Uganda (Kayonza and Kamengo).
