= White spotted sapphire =

Conservation status
- Vulnerable (IUCN 2.3)

Scientific classification
- Kingdom: Animalia
- Phylum: Arthropoda
- Class: Insecta
- Order: Lepidoptera
- Family: Lycaenidae
- Genus: Iolaus
- Species: I. lulua

Binomial name
- Iolaus lulua (Riley, 1944)

Synonyms
- Pseudiolaus poultoni lulua Riley, 1944

Species of butterfly

The white spotted sapphire (Iolaus lulua) is a species of butterfly in the family Lycaenidae. It is endemic to South Africa, where it is restricted to the forested coastal dunes of northern KwaZulu-Natal and sandy lowland forests from False Bay to Kosi Bay, inland to the Ndumu and Lebombo foothills. The habitat consists of coastal forests and thick bush.

The wingspan is 26–30 mm for males and 28–32 mm for females. Adults are on wing from October to December and in March. There are two generations per year.

The larvae feed on Helixanthera woodii, Helixanthera kirkii and Oncocalyx bolusii.
