= Iolaus scintillans =

Scientific classification
- Kingdom: Animalia
- Phylum: Arthropoda
- Class: Insecta
- Order: Lepidoptera
- Family: Lycaenidae
- Genus: Iolaus
- Species: I. scintillans

Binomial name
- Iolaus scintillans Aurivillius, 1905

Synonyms
- Jolaus scintillans Aurivillius, 1905; Iolaus (Epamera) scintillans; Epamera gazei Druce, 1912

Species of butterfly

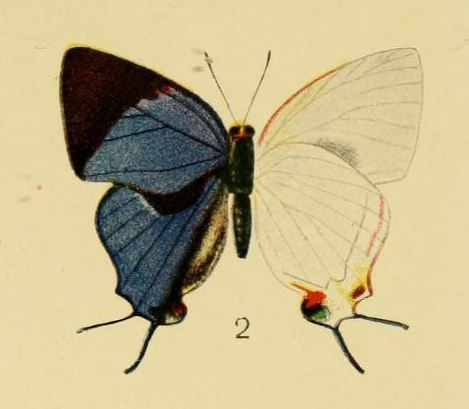
Iolaus scintillans

Iolaus scintillans, the scintillating sapphire, is a butterfly in the family Lycaenidae. It is found in Senegal, Burkina Faso, northern Ivory Coast, northern Ghana, northern Nigeria, Cameroon, southern Sudan and northern Uganda. The habitat consists of very dry savanna.

The larvae feed on Globimetula braunii.
