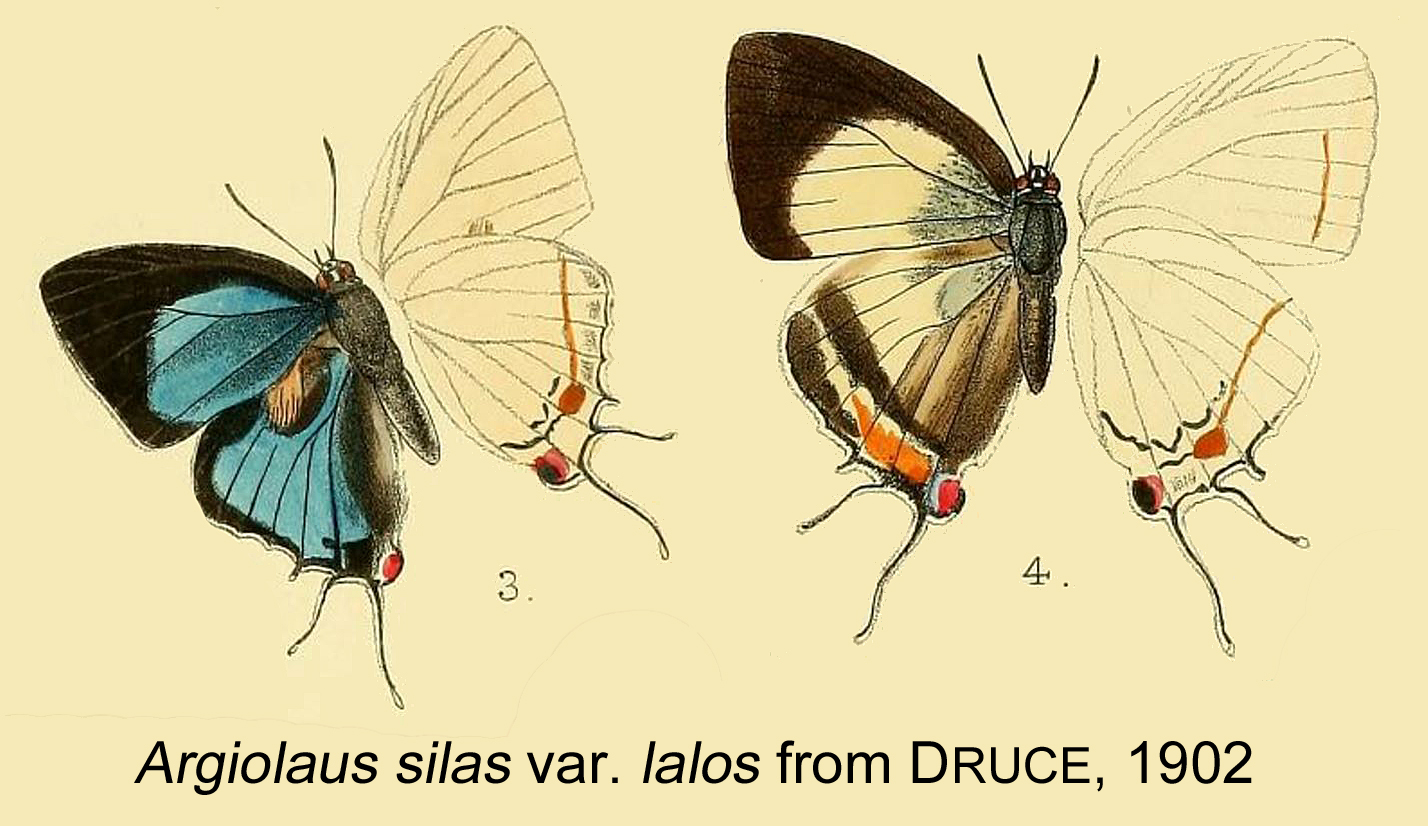

Scientific classification
- Kingdom: Animalia
- Phylum: Arthropoda
- Class: Insecta
- Order: Lepidoptera
- Family: Lycaenidae
- Genus: Iolaus
- Species: I. lalos

Binomial name
- Iolaus lalos (H. H. Druce, 1896)

Synonyms
- Argiolaus silas lalos H. H. Druce, 1896; Iolaus (Argiolaus) lalos; Argiolaus lalos kigezi Stempffer & Bennett, 1958

= Iolaus lalos =

Species of butterfly

Iolaus lalos, the lalos sapphire or pale sapphire, is a butterfly in the family Lycaenidae. The species was first described by Hamilton Herbert Druce in 1896. It is found in Uganda, Kenya, Tanzania, Malawi, Zimbabwe and Mozambique. The habitat consists of forests (including coastal forests) and coastal dune bush.

Adults are on wing from December to March.

The larvae feed on Phragmanthera usuiensis usuiensis and Erianthemum dregei.

== Subspecies ==
- Iolaus lalos lalos (coast of Kenya, Malawi, Zimbabwe: Chirinda Forest, Mozambique: Beira, Tanzania: coast inland to Usambara, Uluguru and Kilimanjaro mountains and Pemba Island)
- Iolaus lalos kigezi (Stempffer & Bennett, 1958) (Uganda: west to the Kigezi and Ankole districts)
