= Iolaus nolaensis =

Scientific classification
- Kingdom: Animalia
- Phylum: Arthropoda
- Class: Insecta
- Order: Lepidoptera
- Family: Lycaenidae
- Genus: Iolaus
- Species: I. nolaensis

Binomial name
- Iolaus nolaensis (Stempffer, 1951)

Synonyms
- Epamera nolaensis Stempffer, 1951; Iolaus (Epamera) nolaensis; Epamera nolaensis amanica Stempffer, 1951

Species of butterfly

Iolaus nolaensis is a butterfly in the family Lycaenidae. It is found in the Republic of the Congo, Tanzania and Zambia.

The larvae feed on the Agelanthus species A. subulatus, A. sansibarensis, A. tanganyikae and A. scassellatii.

== Subspecies ==
- Iolaus nolaensis nolaensis (Republic of the Congo: Haute Sangha)
- Iolaus nolaensis amanica (Stempffer, 1951) (Tanzania: north-east to the Usambara Mountains, Zambia)
