= Iolaus helenae =

Scientific classification
- Kingdom: Animalia
- Phylum: Arthropoda
- Class: Insecta
- Order: Lepidoptera
- Family: Lycaenidae
- Genus: Iolaus
- Species: I. helenae

Binomial name
- Iolaus helenae Henning & Henning, 1989

Synonyms
- Iolaus (Epamera) helenae

Species of butterfly

Iolaus helenae is a butterfly in the family Lycaenidae. It is found in north-eastern Zambia.

The larvae feed on Agelanthus zizyphifolius vittatus, Agelanthus subulatus and Englerina inaequilatera.
