= Iolaus mafugae =

Scientific classification
- Kingdom: Animalia
- Phylum: Arthropoda
- Clade: Pancrustacea
- Class: Insecta
- Order: Lepidoptera
- Family: Lycaenidae
- Genus: Iolaus
- Species: I. mafugae

Binomial name
- Iolaus mafugae (Stempffer & Bennett, 1959)

Synonyms
- Iolaus (Epamera) mafugae; Epamera aphnaeoides mafugae Stempffer & Bennett, 1959; Iolaus diametra mafugae

Species of butterfly

Iolaus mafugae is a butterfly in the family Lycaenidae. It is found in Uganda (the Kigezi District) and the Democratic Republic of the Congo (Kivu). Its habitat consists of montane forests.
