= Iolaus likpe =

Conservation status
- Data Deficient (IUCN 3.1)

Scientific classification
- Kingdom: Animalia
- Phylum: Arthropoda
- Class: Insecta
- Order: Lepidoptera
- Family: Lycaenidae
- Genus: Iolaus
- Species: I. likpe

Binomial name
- Iolaus likpe Collins & Larsen, 2003

Synonyms
- Iolaus (Philiolaus) likpe

Species of butterfly

Iolaus likpe, the Likpe sapphire, is a butterfly in the family Lycaenidae. It is found in Ghana.
