= Iolaus maritimus =

Scientific classification
- Kingdom: Animalia
- Phylum: Arthropoda
- Class: Insecta
- Order: Lepidoptera
- Family: Lycaenidae
- Genus: Iolaus
- Species: I. maritimus

Binomial name
- Iolaus maritimus (Stempffer & Bennett, 1958)

Synonyms
- Iolaphilus maritimus Stempffer & Bennett, 1958; Iolaus (Argiolaus) maritimus; Iolaphilus maritimus usambara Stempffer, 1961

Species of butterfly

Iolaus maritimus, the coastal sapphire, is a butterfly in the family Lycaenidae. It is found in Kenya and Tanzania. The habitat consists of coastal and subcoastal forests.

The larvae feed on Erianthemum schelei, Phragmanthera usuiensis sigensis, Oedina pendens and Oedina congdoniana.

== Subspecies ==
- Iolaus maritimus maritimus (coast of Kenya)
- Iolaus maritimus usambara (Stempffer, 1961) (Tanzania: north-east to the Usambara Mountains)
