= Iolaus icipe =

Scientific classification
- Kingdom: Animalia
- Phylum: Arthropoda
- Class: Insecta
- Order: Lepidoptera
- Family: Lycaenidae
- Genus: Iolaus
- Species: I. icipe

Binomial name
- Iolaus icipe Collins & Larsen, 1998

Synonyms
- Iolaus (Iolaphilus) icipe

Species of butterfly

Iolaus icipe is a butterfly in the family Lycaenidae. It is found in Cameroon and the Central African Republic.

Adults are on wing in January, February and July.
