= Iolaus stenogrammica =

Scientific classification
- Kingdom: Animalia
- Phylum: Arthropoda
- Class: Insecta
- Order: Lepidoptera
- Family: Lycaenidae
- Genus: Iolaus
- Species: I. stenogrammica

Binomial name
- Iolaus stenogrammica (Riley, 1928)

Synonyms
- Epamera laon stenogrammica Riley, 1928; Iolaus (Epamera) stenogrammica

Species of butterfly

Iolaus stenogrammica is a butterfly in the family Lycaenidae. It is found in Uganda, western Kenya, north-western Tanzania, the Democratic Republic of the Congo (Sankuru) and Zambia. The habitat consists of forests.

The larvae feed on Globimetula braunii and Agelanthus krausei.
