= Iolaus manasei =

Scientific classification
- Kingdom: Animalia
- Phylum: Arthropoda
- Class: Insecta
- Order: Lepidoptera
- Family: Lycaenidae
- Genus: Iolaus
- Species: I. manasei

Binomial name
- Iolaus manasei (Libert, 1993)

Synonyms
- Argiolaus manasei Libert, 1993; Iolaus (Argiolaus) manasei

Species of butterfly

Iolaus manasei is a butterfly in the family Lycaenidae. It is found in Cameroon.
