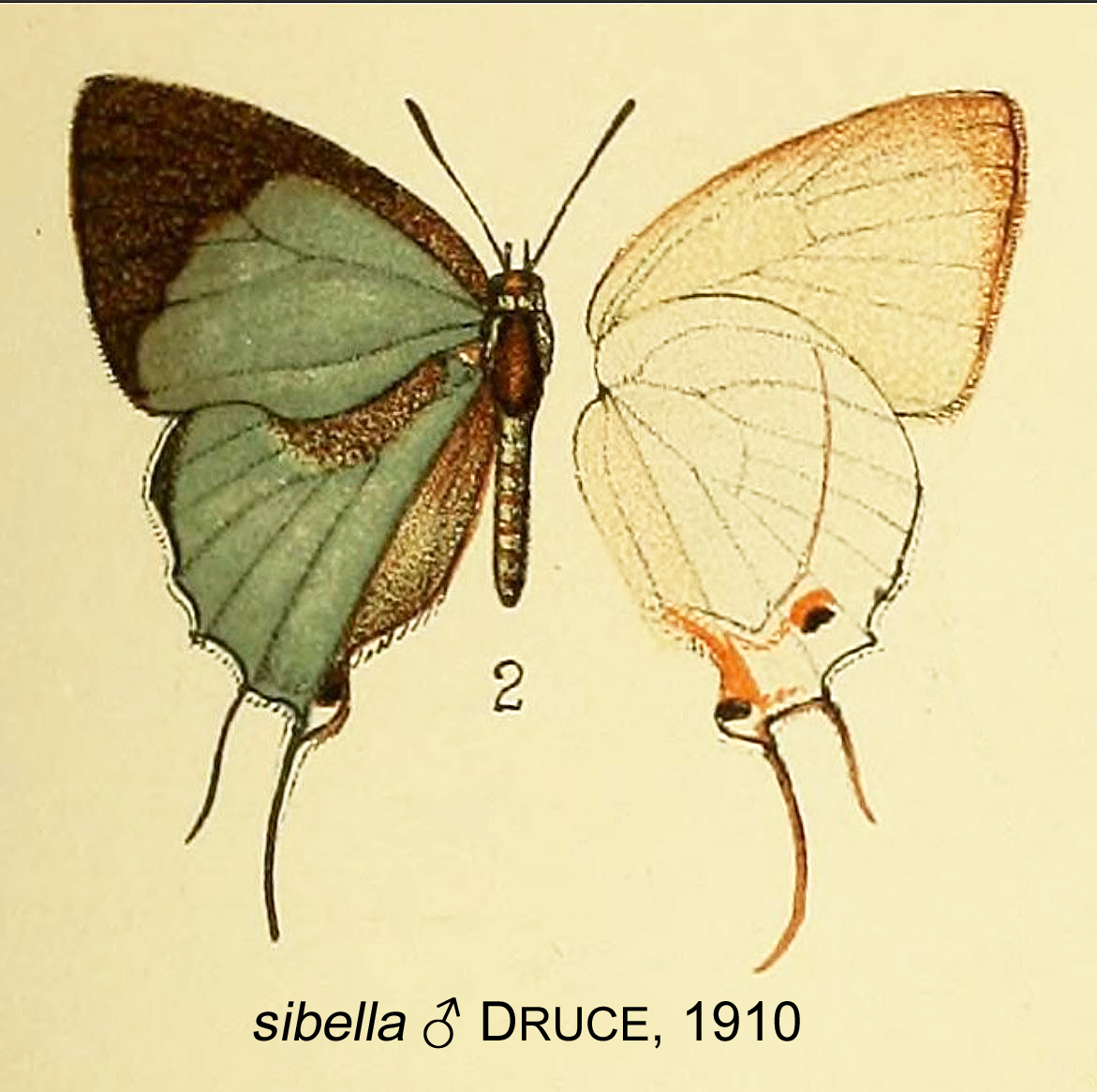

Scientific classification
- Kingdom: Animalia
- Phylum: Arthropoda
- Class: Insecta
- Order: Lepidoptera
- Family: Lycaenidae
- Genus: Iolaus
- Species: I. sibella

Binomial name
- Iolaus sibella (H. H. Druce, 1910)

Synonyms
- Epamera sibella H. H. Druce, 1910; Iolaus (Epamera) sibella

= Iolaus sibella =

Species of butterfly

Iolaus sibella is a butterfly in the family Lycaenidae first described by Hamilton Herbert Druce in 1910. It is found in Cameroon, the Democratic Republic of the Congo (Ituri), Uganda, western Kenya and Zambia. The habitat consists of forests.

The larvae feed on Globimetula braunii and Englerina woodfordioides.
