= Iolaus schultzei =

Scientific classification
- Kingdom: Animalia
- Phylum: Arthropoda
- Class: Insecta
- Order: Lepidoptera
- Family: Lycaenidae
- Genus: Iolaus
- Species: I. schultzei

Binomial name
- Iolaus schultzei Aurivillius, 1905

Synonyms
- Jolaus schultzei Aurivillius, 1905; Iolaus (Iolaphilus) schultzei

Species of butterfly

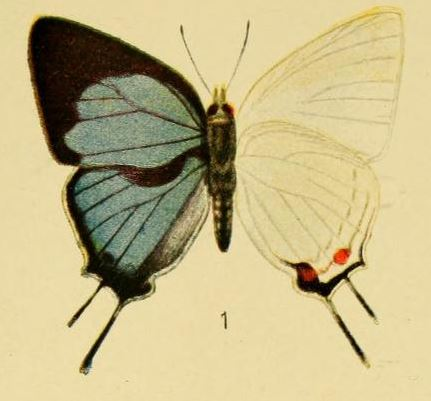
Iolaus schultzei

Iolaus schultzei, the Schultze's sapphire, is a butterfly in the family Lycaenidae. It is found in northern Cameroon. The habitat consists of dry savanna.
