= Iolaus banco =

Scientific classification
- Kingdom: Animalia
- Phylum: Arthropoda
- Class: Insecta
- Order: Lepidoptera
- Family: Lycaenidae
- Genus: Iolaus
- Species: I. banco

Binomial name
- Iolaus banco Stempffer, 1966

Synonyms
- Iolaus (Epamera) banco

Species of butterfly

Iolaus banco, the Banco fine sapphire, is a butterfly in the family Lycaenidae. It is found in Ivory Coast and western Ghana.

== See also ==
- Banco National Park
