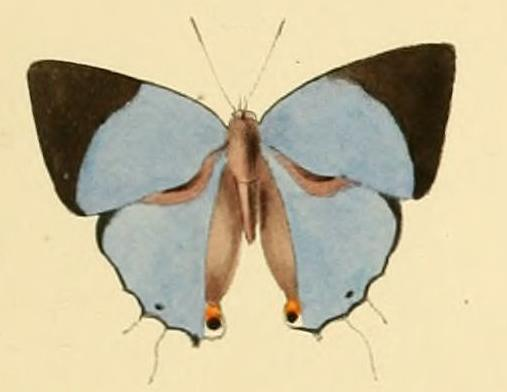

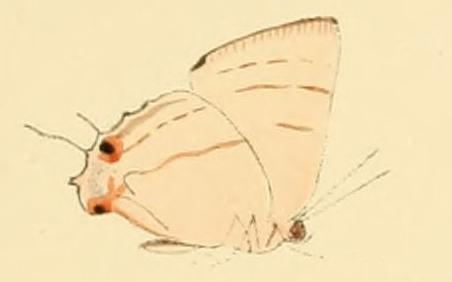

Scientific classification
- Kingdom: Animalia
- Phylum: Arthropoda
- Class: Insecta
- Order: Lepidoptera
- Family: Lycaenidae
- Genus: Iolaus
- Species: I. bolissus

Binomial name
- Iolaus bolissus Hewitson, 1873

Synonyms
- Iolaus (Iolaus) bolissus

= Iolaus bolissus =

Species of butterfly

Iolaus bolissus is a butterfly in the family Lycaenidae. It is found in Cameroon, Gabon, the Republic of the Congo, the Democratic Republic of the Congo, Uganda, Kenya and Zambia. The habitat consists of forests.

The larvae feed on Englerina woodfordioides and Tapinanthus dependens.

== Subspecies ==
- Iolaus bolissus bolissus (Gabon, Congo, Democratic Republic of the Congo, Zambia)
- Iolaus bolissus aurora Clench, 1964 (Uganda, western Kenya)
- Iolaus bolissus azureus Clench, 1964 (Cameroon)
