= Iolaus bilineata =

Scientific classification
- Kingdom: Animalia
- Phylum: Arthropoda
- Clade: Pancrustacea
- Class: Insecta
- Order: Lepidoptera
- Family: Lycaenidae
- Genus: Iolaus
- Species: I. bilineata

Binomial name
- Iolaus bilineata Bethune-Baker, 1908

Synonyms
- Iolaus (Iolaus) bilineata

Species of butterfly

Iolaus bilineata is a butterfly in the family Lycaenidae. It is found in the Democratic Republic of the Congo.
