= Iolaus aethes =

Scientific classification
- Kingdom: Animalia
- Phylum: Arthropoda
- Class: Insecta
- Order: Lepidoptera
- Family: Lycaenidae
- Genus: Iolaus
- Species: I. aethes

Binomial name
- Iolaus aethes Clench, 1964

Synonyms
- Iolaus (Epamera) aphnaeoides aethes Clench, 1964; Iolaus (Epamera) aethes; Iolaus diametra aethes

Species of butterfly

Iolaus aethes is a butterfly in the family Lycaenidae. It is found in Cameroon.
