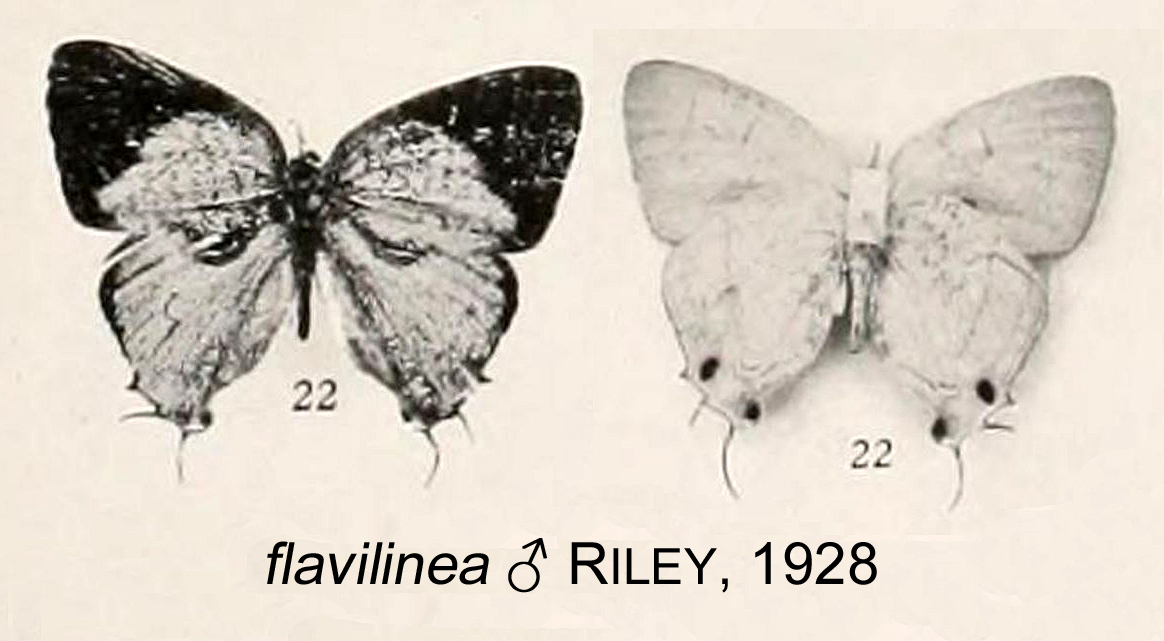

Scientific classification
- Kingdom: Animalia
- Phylum: Arthropoda
- Class: Insecta
- Order: Lepidoptera
- Family: Lycaenidae
- Genus: Iolaus
- Species: I. flavilinea

Binomial name
- Iolaus flavilinea (Riley, 1928)

Synonyms
- Epamera flavilinea Riley, 1928; Iolaus (Epamera) flavilinea

= Iolaus flavilinea =

Species of butterfly

Iolaus flavilinea is a butterfly in the family Lycaenidae. It is found in Cameroon and Zambia.
