= Iolaus normani =

Scientific classification
- Kingdom: Animalia
- Phylum: Arthropoda
- Class: Insecta
- Order: Lepidoptera
- Family: Lycaenidae
- Genus: Iolaus
- Species: I. normani

Binomial name
- Iolaus normani (Larsen, 1986)

Synonyms
- Epamera normani Larsen, 1986; Iolaus (Epamera) normani; Epamera normani meamui Collins & Larsen, 2005

Species of butterfly

Iolaus normani, the Norman's sapphire, is a butterfly in the family Lycaenidae. It is found in Guinea and Nigeria. The habitat consists of dry forests in Guinea savanna.

Adults of both sexes mud-puddle.

== Subspecies ==
- Iolaus normani normani (Nigeria: Anara Forest Reserve)
- Iolaus normani meamui Collins & Larsen, 2005 (Guinea: Fouta Djalon)
