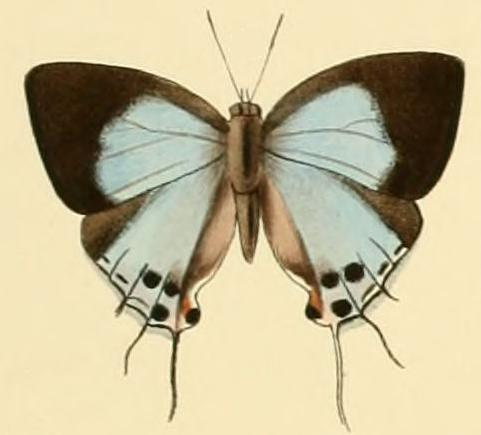

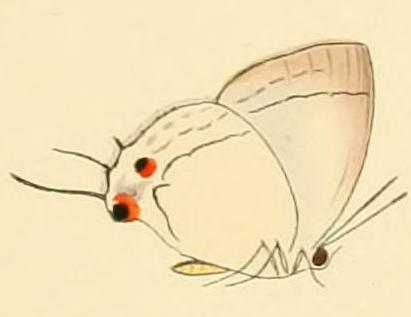

Scientific classification
- Kingdom: Animalia
- Phylum: Arthropoda
- Clade: Pancrustacea
- Class: Insecta
- Order: Lepidoptera
- Family: Lycaenidae
- Genus: Iolaus
- Species: I. belli

Binomial name
- Iolaus belli Hewitson, 1869

Synonyms
- Argiolaus belli

= Iolaus belli =

Species of butterfly

Iolaus belli is a butterfly in the family Lycaenidae. The species was described from Sherbro Island in Sierra Leone. The current status of the species is unknown.
