= Iolaus dianae =

Scientific classification
- Kingdom: Animalia
- Phylum: Arthropoda
- Class: Insecta
- Order: Lepidoptera
- Family: Lycaenidae
- Genus: Iolaus
- Species: I. dianae

Binomial name
- Iolaus dianae Heath, 1983

Synonyms
- Iolaus (Argiolaus) dianae

Species of butterfly

Iolaus dianae is a butterfly in the family Lycaenidae. It is found in Zambia (the Copperbelt Province and the north-western part of the country).

The larvae feed on Phragmanthera polycrypta and Erianthemum species.
