= Iolaus fontainei =

Scientific classification
- Kingdom: Animalia
- Phylum: Arthropoda
- Class: Insecta
- Order: Lepidoptera
- Family: Lycaenidae
- Genus: Iolaus
- Species: I. fontainei

Binomial name
- Iolaus fontainei (Stempffer, 1956)

Synonyms
- Epamera fontainei Stempffer, 1956; Iolaus (Epamera) fontainei

Species of butterfly

Iolaus fontainei, the Fontaine's sapphire, is a butterfly in the family Lycaenidae. It is found in Ghana (the Volta Region), Nigeria (the Cross River loop), Cameroon, the Republic of the Congo, the Central African Republic, the Democratic Republic of the Congo (Kinshasa and Uele), Uganda and north-western Tanzania.

The larvae feed on Tapinanthus erectotruncatus and Tapinanthus dependens.
