= Iolaus pseudopollux =

Scientific classification
- Kingdom: Animalia
- Phylum: Arthropoda
- Class: Insecta
- Order: Lepidoptera
- Family: Lycaenidae
- Genus: Iolaus
- Species: I. pseudopollux

Binomial name
- Iolaus pseudopollux Stempffer, 1962

Synonyms
- Iolaus (Epamera) pseudopollux

Species of butterfly

Iolaus pseudopollux is a butterfly in the family Lycaenidae. It is found in south-western Uganda.

The larvae feed on Agelanthus zizyphifolius.
