= Iolaus adorabilis =

Scientific classification
- Kingdom: Animalia
- Phylum: Arthropoda
- Class: Insecta
- Order: Lepidoptera
- Family: Lycaenidae
- Genus: Iolaus
- Species: I. adorabilis

Binomial name
- Iolaus adorabilis Collins & Larsen, 2008

Species of butterfly

Iolaus adorabilis is a butterfly in the family Lycaenidae. It is found in Cameroon and Nigeria.
