= Iolaus aurivillii =

Scientific classification
- Kingdom: Animalia
- Phylum: Arthropoda
- Clade: Pancrustacea
- Class: Insecta
- Order: Lepidoptera
- Family: Lycaenidae
- Genus: Iolaus
- Species: I. aurivillii

Binomial name
- Iolaus aurivillii Röber, 1900

Synonyms
- Jolaus aurivillii Röber, 1900; Iolaus (Epamera) aurivillii; Jolaus sapphirinus Aurivillius, 1897

Species of butterfly

Iolaus aurivillii, Aurivillius' sapphire, is a butterfly in the family Lycaenidae. It is found in southern Nigeria, Cameroon, Gabon, the Republic of the Congo, the Democratic Republic of the Congo, Uganda, western Kenya and Zambia. The habitat consists of forests.

The larvae feed on Englerina gabonensis and Globimetula braunii.
