= Iolaus jamesoni =

Scientific classification
- Kingdom: Animalia
- Phylum: Arthropoda
- Class: Insecta
- Order: Lepidoptera
- Family: Lycaenidae
- Genus: Iolaus
- Species: I. jamesoni

Binomial name
- Iolaus jamesoni (Druce, 1891)

Synonyms
- Argiolaus jamesoni Druce, 1891; Iolaus (Iolaphilus) jamesoni

Species of butterfly

Iolaus jamesoni is a butterfly in the family Lycaenidae. It is found in the Democratic Republic of the Congo, Uganda, western Kenya and north-western Tanzania. The habitat consists of forests.

The larvae feed on Globimetula braunii.
