= Iolaus shaba =

Scientific classification
- Kingdom: Animalia
- Phylum: Arthropoda
- Class: Insecta
- Order: Lepidoptera
- Family: Lycaenidae
- Genus: Iolaus
- Species: I. shaba

Binomial name
- Iolaus shaba Collins & Larsen, 1995

Synonyms
- Iolaus (Iolaphilus) shaba

Species of butterfly

Iolaus shaba is a butterfly in the family Lycaenidae. It is found in the Democratic Republic of the Congo.

Adults have been recorded in September.
