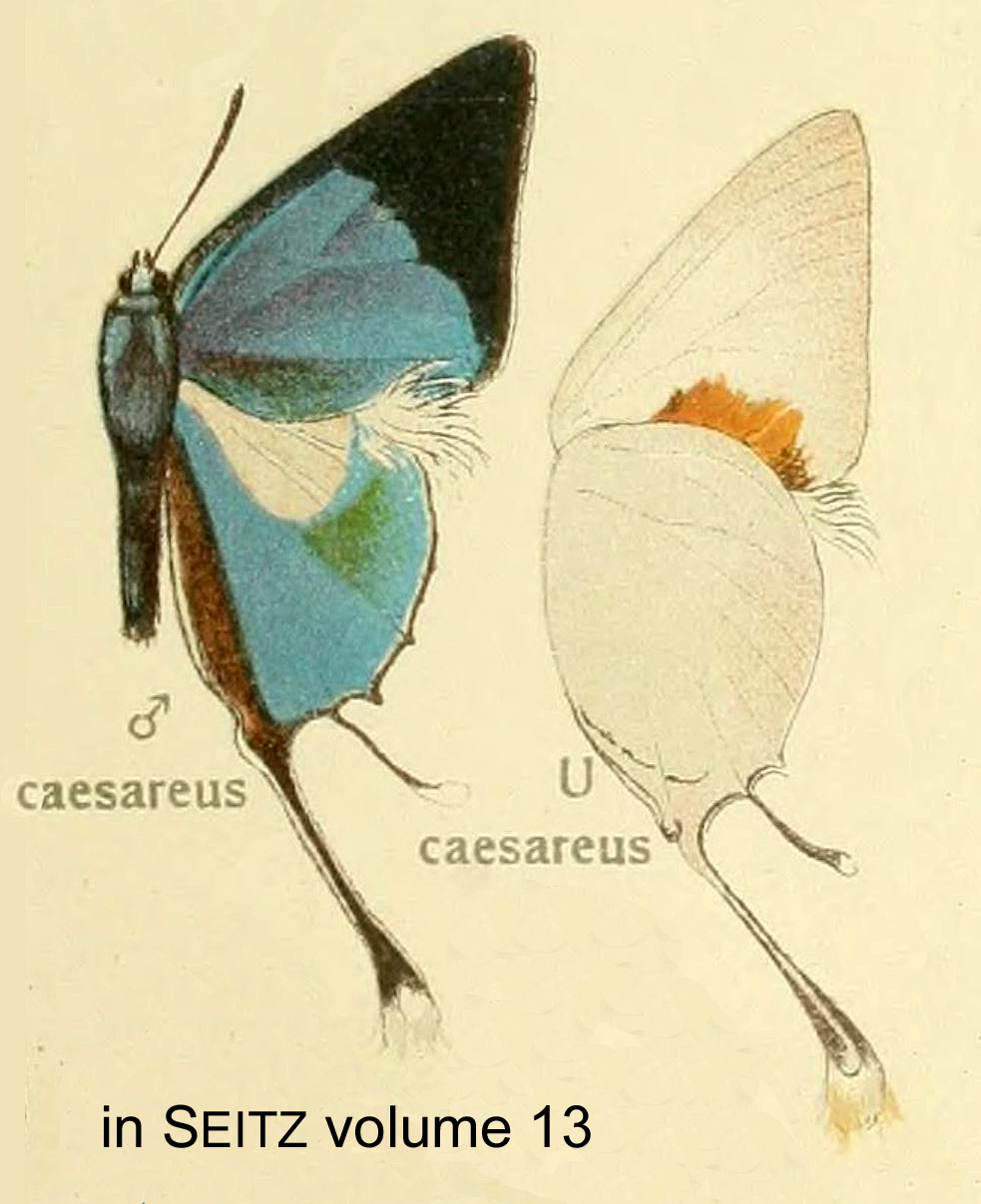

Scientific classification
- Kingdom: Animalia
- Phylum: Arthropoda
- Class: Insecta
- Order: Lepidoptera
- Family: Lycaenidae
- Genus: Iolaus
- Species: I. caesareus

Binomial name
- Iolaus caesareus Aurivillius, 1895

Synonyms
- Iolaus (Argiolaus) caesareus

= Iolaus caesareus =

Species of butterfly

Iolaus caesareus is a butterfly in the family Lycaenidae. It is found in Cameroon, the Republic of the Congo and the Democratic Republic of the Congo.

== Subspecies ==
- Iolaus caesareus caesareus (Cameroon, Democratic Republic of the Congo: Uele, Tshuapa and Equateur)
- Iolaus caesareus cleopatrae Collins & Larsen, 2000 (Republic of the Congo)
