= Iolaus carolinae =

Conservation status
- Data Deficient (IUCN 3.1)

Scientific classification
- Kingdom: Animalia
- Phylum: Arthropoda
- Class: Insecta
- Order: Lepidoptera
- Family: Lycaenidae
- Genus: Iolaus
- Species: I. carolinae

Binomial name
- Iolaus carolinae Collins & Larsen, 2000

Synonyms
- Iolaus (Iolaphilus) carolinae

Species of butterfly

Iolaus carolinae, the Caroline's sapphire, is a butterfly in the family Lycaenidae. It is found in western Ivory Coast and Ghana (from the eastern part of the country to the Cape Coast). The habitat consists of forests and coastal scrubland.

Adults are on wing in August and March.
