= Iolaus pseudofrater =

Scientific classification
- Kingdom: Animalia
- Phylum: Arthropoda
- Class: Insecta
- Order: Lepidoptera
- Family: Lycaenidae
- Genus: Iolaus
- Species: I. pseudofrater

Binomial name
- Iolaus pseudofrater Stempffer, 1962

Synonyms
- Iolaus (Epamera) pseudofrater

Species of butterfly

Iolaus pseudofrater is a butterfly in the family Lycaenidae. It is found in Uganda (from the south-west to the Kigezi District).
