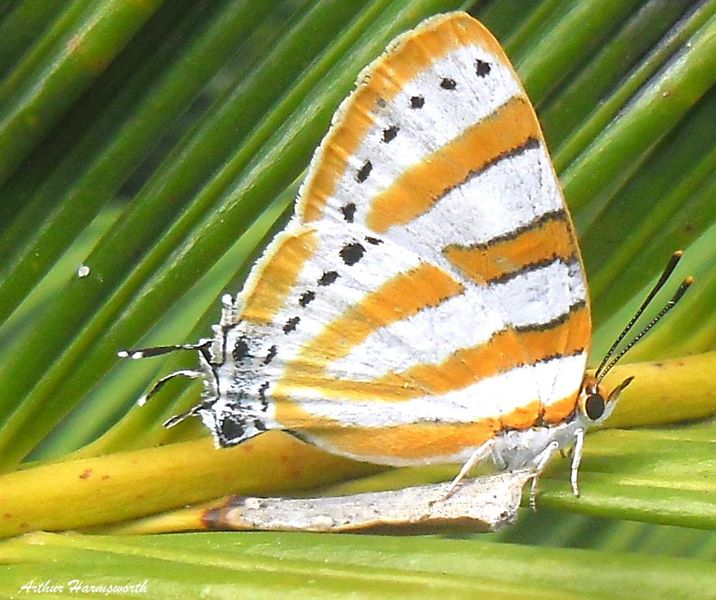

Conservation status
- Least Concern (IUCN 3.1)

Scientific classification
- Kingdom: Animalia
- Phylum: Arthropoda
- Class: Insecta
- Order: Lepidoptera
- Family: Lycaenidae
- Genus: Iolaus
- Species: I. nasisii

Binomial name
- Iolaus nasisii (Riley, 1928)

Synonyms
- Epamera aphnaeoides nasisii Riley, 1928

= Iolaus nasisii =

Species of butterfly

Iolaus nasisii, the Nasisi sapphire or Zimbabwe yellow-banded sapphire, is a butterfly of the family Lycaenidae. It is found in the forest and savannah in the extreme north of Limpopo, north to Uganda, western Kenya, Tanzania, Malawi, northern Zambia, Zimbabwe, Botswana and Namibia (Caprivi).

The wingspan is 26–28 mm for males and 27–29 mm for females. Adults are on wing from October to March in South Africa. There is one generation per year.

The larvae feed on the Tapinanthus species T. quinquagulus, T. dicrous, T. nyasicus, T. ceciliae, T. brunneus, T. subulatus and Oliverella rubroviridis.
