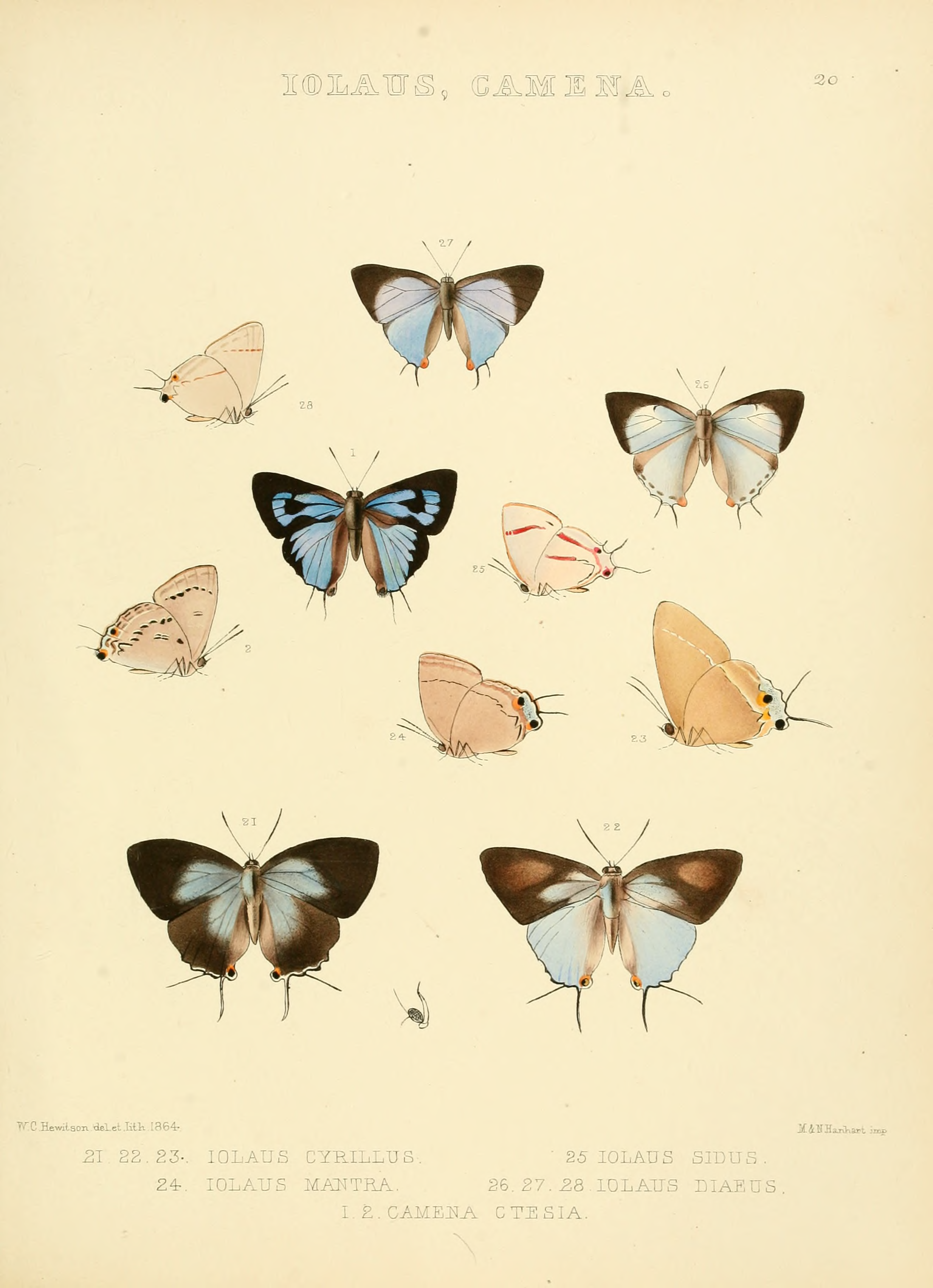
- Epamera sidus (now Iolaus sidus) figure 25

Scientific classification
- Kingdom: Animalia
- Phylum: Arthropoda
- Class: Insecta
- Order: Lepidoptera
- Family: Lycaenidae
- Genus: Epamera; H. H. Druce, 1891

= Epamera =

Butterfly genus or subgenus in family Lycaenidae

Epamera is a genus-group of butterflies in the family Lycaenidae first described by Hamilton Herbert Druce in 1891. Most authorities consider Epamera to be a subgenus of Iolaus. The species of Epamera are found in the Afrotropical realm.
