= Iolaus christofferi =

Scientific classification
- Kingdom: Animalia
- Phylum: Arthropoda
- Class: Insecta
- Order: Lepidoptera
- Family: Lycaenidae
- Genus: Iolaus
- Species: I. christofferi

Binomial name
- Iolaus christofferi Collins & Larsen, 2003

Synonyms
- Iolaus (Philiolaus) christofferi

Species of butterfly

Iolaus christofferi is a butterfly in the family Lycaenidae. It is found in northern Cameroon. The habitat consists of dry savanna.

== Etymology ==
The species is named for the Swedish lepidopterist Per Olof Christopher Aurivillius.
