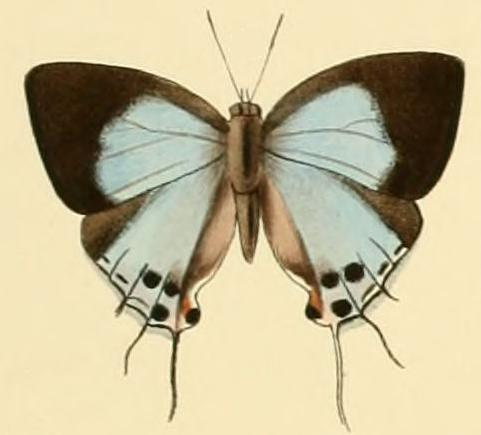

Scientific classification
- Kingdom: Animalia
- Phylum: Arthropoda
- Class: Insecta
- Order: Lepidoptera
- Family: Lycaenidae
- Subfamily: Theclinae
- Genus: Argiolaus; Druce, 1891

= Argiolaus =

Genus of butterflies

Argiolaus is a genus of butterflies in the family Lycaenidae. Most authorities consider Argiolaus to be a subgenus of Iolaus. The members (species) of this genus are found in the Afrotropical realm.
