= Iolaus aequatorialis =

Scientific classification
- Kingdom: Animalia
- Phylum: Arthropoda
- Class: Insecta
- Order: Lepidoptera
- Family: Lycaenidae
- Genus: Iolaus
- Species: I. aequatorialis

Binomial name
- Iolaus aequatorialis (Stempffer & Bennett, 1958)

Synonyms
- Iolaphilus aequatorialis Stempffer & Bennett, 1958; Iolaus (Argiolaus) aequatorialis

Species of butterfly

Iolaus aequatorialis is a butterfly in the family Lycaenidae. It is found in Zambia, north-western Tanzania, Uganda, the Democratic Republic of the Congo (Sankuru) and Gabon.

The larvae feed on Phragmanthera usuiensis and Phragmanthera polycrypta subglabriflora.
