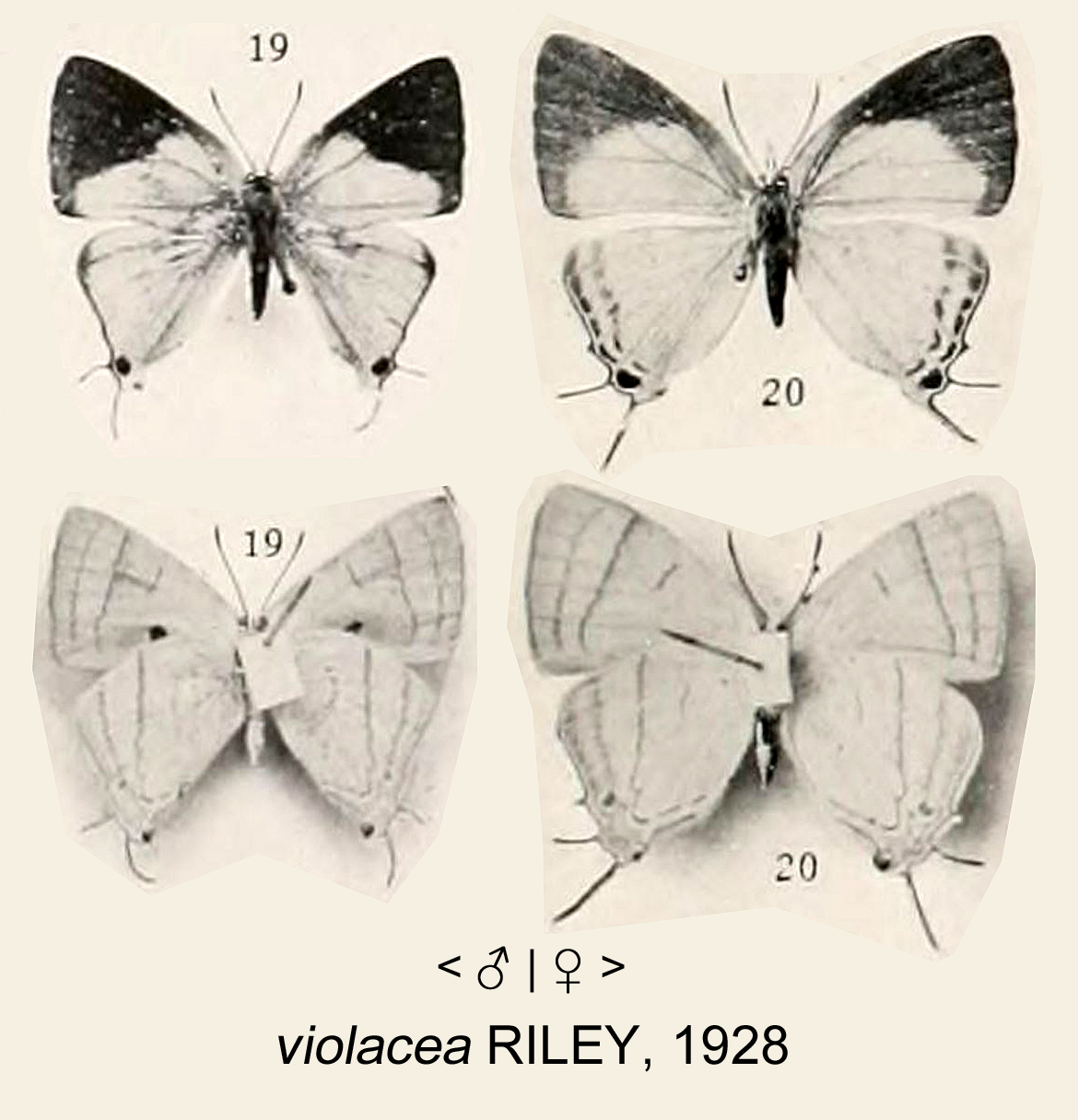

Scientific classification
- Kingdom: Animalia
- Phylum: Arthropoda
- Class: Insecta
- Order: Lepidoptera
- Family: Lycaenidae
- Genus: Iolaus
- Species: I. violacea

Binomial name
- Iolaus violacea (Riley, 1928)

Synonyms
- Epamera violacea Riley, 1928; Iolaus (Epamera) violacea; Iolaus katanganus Romieux, 1934

= Iolaus violacea =

Species of butterfly

Iolaus violacea, the violaceous sapphire, is a butterfly in the family Lycaenidae. It is found in Angola, the Democratic Republic of the Congo (Shaba and Tanganika), north-eastern Zimbabwe, Zambia, Malawi, Tanzania (Ukerewe Island and Lake Victoria) and possibly western Mozambique. The habitat consists of Brachystegia woodland.

The larvae feed on Tapinanthus quinquangulus, Tapinanthus sansibarensis, Tapinanthus erianthus, Tapinanthus oleifolius, Phragmenthera usuiensis usuiensis, Helixanthera tetrapartita, Globimetula braunii, Globimetula mweroensis, Globimetula pachyclada, Globimetula rubripes, Globimetula anguliflora and Agelanthus fuellebornii.
