= Iolaus ndolae =

Scientific classification
- Kingdom: Animalia
- Phylum: Arthropoda
- Class: Insecta
- Order: Lepidoptera
- Family: Lycaenidae
- Genus: Iolaus
- Species: I. ndolae

Binomial name
- Iolaus ndolae (Stempffer & Bennett, 1958)

Synonyms
- Iolaphilus ndolae Stempffer & Bennett, 1958; Iolaus (Argiolaus) ndolae

Species of butterfly

Iolaus ndolae is a butterfly in the family Lycaenidae. It is found in northern Zambia, Malawi, eastern Tanzania and possibly the Democratic Republic of the Congo (Shaba). The habitat consists of forests (including riverine forests).

The larvae feed on Vanwykia rubella, Erianthemum taborense, Erianthemum dregei, Erianthemum virescens, Erianthemum schelei, Phragmanthera usuienesis usuiensis, Phragmanthera proteicola and Tapinanthus erianthus.
