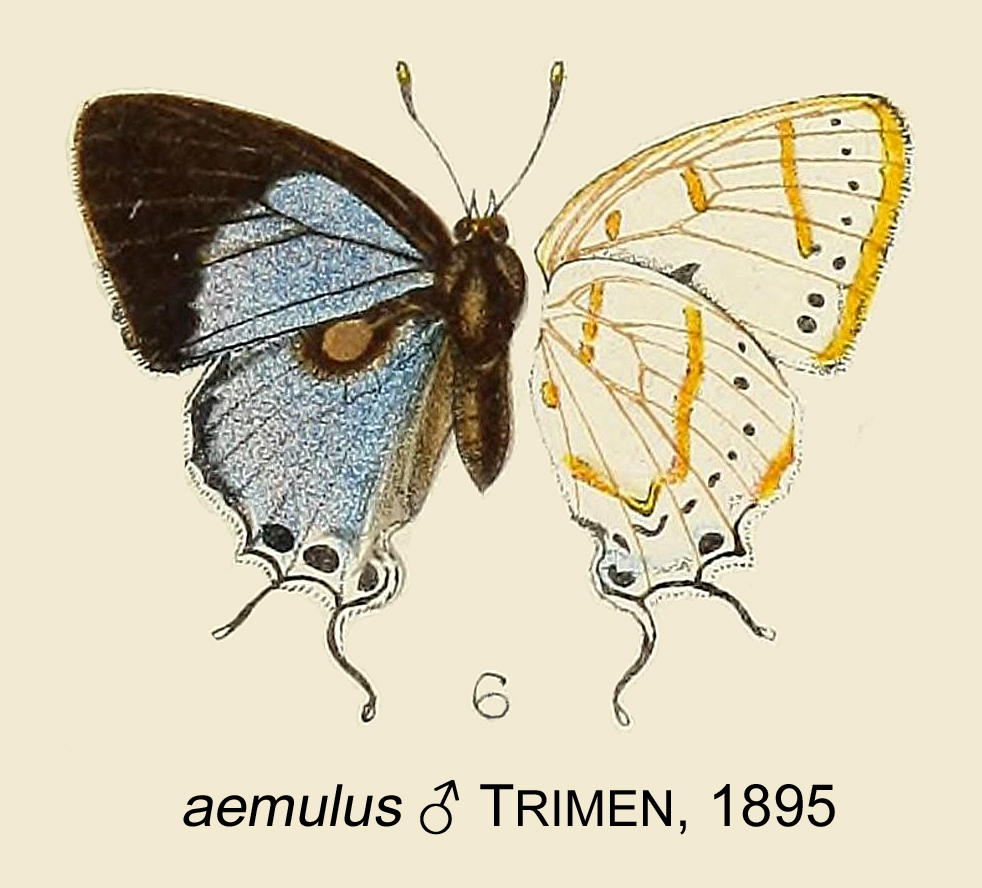

Conservation status
- Least Concern (IUCN 3.1)

Scientific classification
- Kingdom: Animalia
- Phylum: Arthropoda
- Class: Insecta
- Order: Lepidoptera
- Family: Lycaenidae
- Genus: Iolaus
- Species: I. aemulus

Binomial name
- Iolaus aemulus Trimen, 1895

Synonyms
- Epamera aemulus

= Iolaus aemulus =

Short-barred sapphire

Species of butterfly

Iolaus aemulus, the short-barred sapphire, is a butterfly of the family Lycaenidae. It is found from South Africa to coastal eastern Kenya. In South Africa it is found along the coast of Eastern Cape to KwaZulu-Natal, then to Ndumu in Zululand.

The wingspan is 25.5–29.5 mm for males and 26–29 mm for females. Adults are on wing year round but mainly from September to May, with peaks in November and February or March.

The larvae feed on Oncocalyx quinquenervius and Oncocalyx bolusii.
