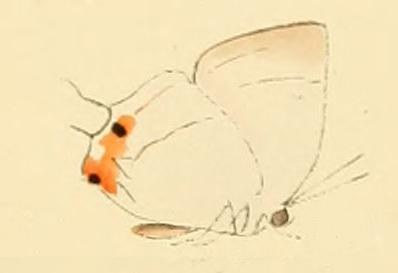

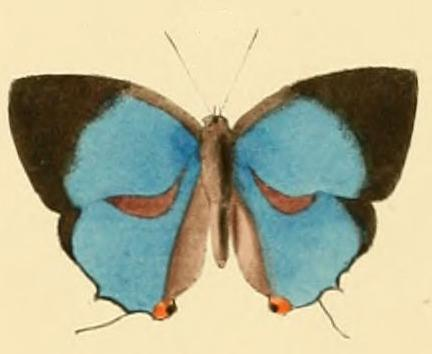

Scientific classification
- Kingdom: Animalia
- Phylum: Arthropoda
- Clade: Pancrustacea
- Class: Insecta
- Order: Lepidoptera
- Family: Lycaenidae
- Genus: Iolaus
- Species: I. cytaeis

Binomial name
- Iolaus cytaeis Hewitson, 1875

Synonyms
- Iolaus (Epamera) cytaeis Hewitson, 1875; Epamera cytaeis caerulea Riley, 1928

= Iolaus cytaeis =

Species of butterfly

Iolaus cytaeis, the cytaeis sapphire, is a butterfly in the family Lycaenidae. It is found in Nigeria, Cameroon, Equatorial Guinea, Gabon, the Republic of the Congo, the Democratic Republic of the Congo and Zambia.

== Subspecies ==
- Iolaus cytaeis cytaeis (Nigeria: west and the Cross River loop), Cameroon, Bioko, Gabon, Congo, Democratic Republic of the Congo: Equateur)
- Iolaus cytaeis caerulea (Riley, 1928) (Democratic Republic of the Congo, Zambia)
