= Iolaus bakeri =

Scientific classification
- Kingdom: Animalia
- Phylum: Arthropoda
- Class: Insecta
- Order: Lepidoptera
- Family: Lycaenidae
- Genus: Iolaus
- Species: I. bakeri

Binomial name
- Iolaus bakeri (Riley, 1928)

Synonyms
- Epamera bakeri Riley, 1928; Iolaus (Epamera) bakeri

Species of butterfly

Iolaus bakeri, the Baker's sapphire , is a butterfly in the family Lycaenidae. It is found in Zimbabwe, Mozambique, Malawi, Zambia and the Democratic Republic of the Congo (Shaba and Kivu).

Adults are on wing year round.

The larvae feed on Tapinanthus oleifolius.
