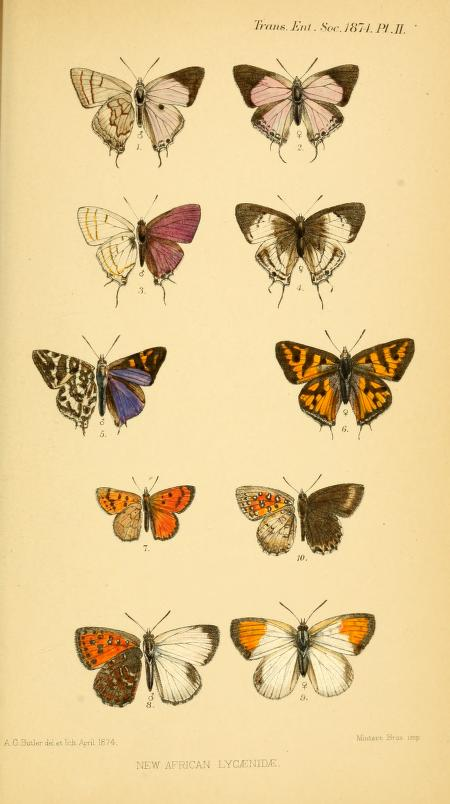
- Iolaus mimosae, figures 1 and 2

Scientific classification
- Kingdom: Animalia
- Phylum: Arthropoda
- Clade: Pancrustacea
- Class: Insecta
- Order: Lepidoptera
- Family: Lycaenidae
- Tribe: Theclini
- Genus: Iolaus; Hübner, [1819]

Type species
- Papilio eurisus Cramer, 1779

Synonyms
- Jolaus; Epamera Druce, 1891; Argiolaus Druce, 1891; Tanuetheira Druce, 1891; Trichiolaus Aurivillius, 1898; Aphniolaus Druce, 1902; Pseudiolaus Riley, 1928; Iolaphilus Stempffer & Bennett, 1958; Philiolaus Stempffer & Bennett, 1958

= Iolaus (butterfly) =

Butterfly genus in family Lycaenidae

Iolaus is a genus of butterflies in the family Lycaenidae. The lineages defined as Argiolaus, Epamera, Iolaphilus and Stugeta are often included in Iolaus. Iolaus species are found in the Afrotropical realm.There are ca. 130 species in Iolaus

Medium-sized butterflies, hind wing with two long tails. The upper side is more or less shiny blue. The undersides are pale greyish-brown, often with a dark transverse line in the dista part or an orange spot at the hind corner of the hindwing.

Most species have larvae that feed onsemi-parasitic plants in the mistletoe family (Viscaceae).

The genus is distributed in sub-Saharan Africa, also in southern Arabia, which is biogeographically part of Africa, and north to Israel.

== Species ==
Adalbert Seitz's Fauna Africana pars Iolaus Africa

.

- Subgenus Iolaus Hübner, [1819]
  - Iolaus bilineata Bethune-Baker, 1908
  - Iolaus bolissus Hewitson, 1873
  - Iolaus carina Hewitson, 1873
  - Iolaus eurisus (Cramer, [1780])
- Subgenus Epamera Druce, 1891
  - Iolaus adorabilis Collins & Larsen, 2008
  - Iolaus aemulus Trimen, 1895
  - Iolaus aethes Clench, 1965
  - Iolaus aethria Karsch, 1893
  - Iolaus agnes Aurivillius, 1898
  - Iolaus alienus (Trimen, 1898)
  - Iolaus apatosa (Stempffer, 1952)
  - Iolaus aphnaeoides Trimen, 1873
  - Iolaus arborifera (Butler, 1901)
  - Iolaus aurivillii Röber, 1900
  - Iolaus australis Stevenson, 1937
  - Iolaus bakeri (Riley, 1928)
  - Iolaus bamptoni (Congdon & Collins, 1998)
  - Iolaus banco Stempffer, 1966
  - Iolaus bansana Bethune-Baker, 1926
  - Iolaus belli Hewitson, 1869 (status unclear)
  - Iolaus bellina (Plötz, 1880)
  - Iolaus coelestis Bethune-Baker, 1926
  - Iolaus congdoni (Kielland, 1985)
  - Iolaus creta Hewitson, 1878
  - Iolaus cytaeis Hewitson, 1875
  - Iolaus diametra Karsch, 1895
  - Iolaus djaloni Collins & Larsen, 1998
  - Iolaus dubiosa (Stempffer & Bennett, 1959)
  - Iolaus farquharsoni (Bethune-Baker, 1922)
  - Iolaus flavilinea (Riley, 1928)
  - Iolaus fontainei (Stempffer, 1956)
  - Iolaus frater (Joicey & Talbot, 1921)
  - Iolaus gemmarius (Druce, 1910)
  - Iolaus glaucus Butler, 1886
  - Iolaus handmani (Gifford, 1965)
  - Iolaus helenae Henning & Henning, 1989
  - Iolaus hemicyanus Sharpe, 1904
  - Iolaus iasis Hewitson, 1865
  - Iolaus jacksoni (Stempffer, 1950)
  - Iolaus kelle Stempffer, 1967
  - Iolaus laon Hewitson, 1878
  - Iolaus leonis (Riley, 1928)
  - Iolaus longicauda (Stempffer & Bennett, 1959)
  - Iolaus maesa (Hewitson, 1862)
  - Iolaus mafugae (Stempffer & Bennett, 1959)
  - Iolaus mermis (Druce, 1896)
  - Iolaus mimosae Trimen, 1874
  - Iolaus mongiro Stempffer, 1969
  - Iolaus moyambina (Stempffer & Bennett, 1959)
  - Iolaus nasisii (Riley, 1928)
  - Iolaus neavei (Druce, 1910)
  - Iolaus nolaensis (Stempffer, 1951)
  - Iolaus normani (Larsen, 1986)
  - Iolaus nursei Butler, 1896
  - Iolaus obscurus Aurivillius, 1923
  - Iolaus penningtoni (Stempffer & Bennett, 1959)
  - Iolaus pollux Aurivillius, 1895
  - Iolaus pseudofrater Stempffer, 1962
  - Iolaus pseudopollux Stempffer, 1962
  - Iolaus sappirus (Druce, 1902)
  - Iolaus scintillans Aurivillius, 1905
  - Iolaus sciophilus (Schultze, 1916)
  - Iolaus sibella (Druce, 1910)
  - Iolaus sidus Trimen, 1864
  - Iolaus silanus (Grose-Smith, 1889)
  - Iolaus stenogrammica (Riley, 1928)
  - Iolaus sudanicus Aurivillius, 1905
  - Iolaus tajoraca Walker, 1870
  - Iolaus umbrosa (Butler, 1886)
  - Iolaus violacea (Riley, 1928)
- Subgenus Aphniolaus Druce, 1902
  - Iolaus pallene (Wallengren, 1857)
- Subgenus Philiolaus Stempffer & Bennett, 1958
  - Iolaus alcibiades Kirby, 1871
  - Iolaus calisto (Westwood, 1851)
  - Iolaus christofferi Collins & Larsen, 2003
  - Iolaus ismenias (Klug, 1834)
  - Iolaus laonides Aurivillius, 1898
  - Iolaus likpe Collins & Larsen, 2003
  - Iolaus lukabas Druce, 1890
  - Iolaus mane Collins & Larsen, 2003
  - Iolaus newporti Larsen, 1994
  - Iolaus ofere Collins & Larsen, 2008
  - Iolaus paneperata Druce, 1890
  - Iolaus parasilanus Rebel, 1914
  - Iolaus poecilaon (Riley, 1928)
  - Iolaus theodori Stempffer, 1970
  - Iolaus vansomereni (Stempffer & Bennett, 1958)
- Subgenus Iolaphilus Stempffer & Bennett, 1958
  - Iolaus aelianus Staudinger, 1891
  - Iolaus alexanderi Warren-Gash, 2003
  - Iolaus carolinae Collins & Larsen, 2000
  - Iolaus gabunica (Riley, 1928)
  - Iolaus henryi (Stempffer, 1961)
  - Iolaus icipe Collins & Larsen, 1998
  - Iolaus iulus Hewitson, 1869
  - Iolaus jamesoni (Druce, 1891)
  - Iolaus menas Druce, 1890
  - Iolaus schultzei Aurivillius, 1905
  - Iolaus shaba Collins & Larsen, 1995
  - Iolaus trimeni Wallengren, 1875
- Subgenus Argiolaus Druce, 1891
  - Iolaus aequatorialis (Stempffer & Bennett, 1958)
  - Iolaus bergeri (Stempffer, 1953)
  - Iolaus caesareus Aurivillius, 1895
  - Iolaus cottrelli (Stempffer & Bennett, 1958)
  - Iolaus crawshayi (Butler, 1901)
  - Iolaus dianae Heath, 1983
  - Iolaus iturensis (Joicey & Talbot, 1921)
  - Iolaus kayonza (Stempffer & Bennett, 1958)
  - Iolaus lalos (Druce, 1896)
  - Iolaus manasei (Libert, 1993)
  - Iolaus maritimus (Stempffer & Bennett, 1958)
  - Iolaus montana (Kielland, 1978)
  - Iolaus ndolae (Stempffer & Bennett, 1958)
  - Iolaus pamae Heath, 1994
  - Iolaus silarus Druce, 1885
  - Iolaus silas (Westwood, [1851])
  - Iolaus stewarti Heath, 1985
- Subgenus Pseudiolaus Riley, 1928
  - Iolaus lulua (Riley, 1944)
  - Iolaus poultoni (Riley, 1928)
- Subgenus Tanuetheira Druce, 1891
  - Iolaus timon (Fabricius, 1787)
- Subgenus Trichiolaus Aurivillius, 1898
  - Iolaus argentarius Butler, 1879
  - Iolaus mermeros (Mabille, 1878)
