= Iolaphilus =

Scientific classification
- Kingdom: Animalia
- Phylum: Arthropoda
- Class: Insecta
- Order: Lepidoptera
- Family: Lycaenidae
- Genus: Iolaphilus; Stempffer & Bennett, 1958

Butterfly genus or subgenus in family Lycaenidae

Iolaphilus is a genus of butterflies in the family Lycaenidae. Most authorities consider Iolaphilus to be a subgenus of Iolaus.
