= List of butterflies of Uganda =

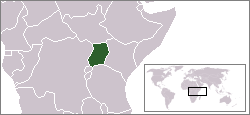
Location of Uganda

This is a partial list of butterflies of Uganda. About 1,235 species are known from Uganda, 31 of which are endemic.

== Papilionidae ==
=== Papilioninae ===
==== Papilionini ====
- Papilio antimachus parva Jackson, 1956
- Papilio zalmoxis Hewitson, 1864
- Papilio nireus nireus Linnaeus, 1758
- Papilio nireus lyaeus Doubleday, 1845
- Papilio nireus pseudonireus Felder & Felder, 1865
- Papilio charopus montuosus Joicey & Talbot, 1927
- Papilio chrapkowskoides chrapkowskoides Storace, 1952
- Papilio chrapkowskoides nurettini Koçak, 1983
- Papilio interjectana Vane-Wright, 1995
- Papilio sosia debilis Storace, 1951
- Papilio cynorta Fabricius, 1793
- Papilio plagiatus Aurivillius, 1898
- Papilio dardanus dardanus Brown, 1776
- Papilio dardanus meseres Carpenter, 1948
- Papilio phorcas congoanus Rothschild, 1896
- Papilio phorcas ruscoei Krüger, 1928
- Papilio rex mimeticus Rothschild, 1897
- Papilio zenobia Fabricius, 1775
- Papilio mechowi mechowi Dewitz, 1881
- Papilio mechowi whitnalli Neave, 1904
- Papilio demodocus Esper, [1798]
- Papilio echerioides joiceyi Gabriel, 1945
- Papilio jacksoni jacksoni Sharpe, 1891
- Papilio jacksoni ruandana Le Cerf, 1924
- Papilio nobilis nobilis Rogenhofer, 1891
- Papilio nobilis crippsianus Stoneham, 1936
- Papilio hesperus Westwood, 1843
- Papilio lormieri neocrocea Koçak, 1983
- Papilio lormieri semlikana Le Cerf, 1924
- Papilio leucotaenia Rothschild, 1908
- Papilio mackinnoni Sharpe, 1891

==== Leptocercini ====
- Graphium antheus (Cramer, 1779)
- Graphium policenes (Cramer, 1775)
- Graphium junodi (Trimen, 1893)
- Graphium colonna (Ward, 1873)
- Graphium gudenusi (Rebel, 1911)
- Graphium angolanus baronis (Ungemach, 1932)
- Graphium ridleyanus (White, 1843)
- Graphium leonidas (Fabricius, 1793)
- Graphium latreillianus theorini (Aurivillius, 1881)
- Graphium philonoe whalleyi (Talbot, 1929)
- Graphium almansor escherichi (Gaede, 1915)
- Graphium almansor uganda (Lathy, 1906)
- Graphium ucalegon schoutedeni Berger, 1950

== Pieridae ==
=== Pseudopontiinae ===
- Pseudopontia paradoxa (Felder & Felder, 1869)
- Pseudopontia gola Sáfián & Mitter, 2010

=== Coliadinae ===
- Eurema brigitta (Stoll, [1780])
- Eurema mandarinula (Holland, 1892)
- Eurema hapale (Mabille, 1882)
- Eurema hecabe solifera (Butler, 1875)
- Eurema senegalensis (Boisduval, 1836)
- Catopsilia florella (Fabricius, 1775)
- Colias electo pseudohecate Berger, 1940

=== Pierinae ===
- Colotis antevippe zera (Lucas, 1852)
- Colotis aurigineus (Butler, 1883)
- Colotis aurora evarne (Klug, 1829)
- Colotis auxo (Lucas, 1852)
- Colotis celimene (Lucas, 1852)
- Colotis chrysonome (Klug, 1829)
- Colotis danae pseudacaste (Butler, 1876)
- Colotis elgonensis elgonensis (Sharpe, 1891)
- Colotis elgonensis basilewskyi Berger, 1956
- Colotis euippe complexivus (Butler, 1886)
- Colotis evenina xantholeuca (Sharpe, 1904)
- Colotis halimede (Klug, 1829)
- Colotis hetaera ankolensis Stoneham, 1940
- Colotis hetaera aspasia (Ungemach, 1932)
- Colotis pallene (Hopffer, 1855)
- Colotis phisadia vagus d'Abrera, 1980
- Colotis protomedia (Klug, 1829)
- Colotis regina (Trimen, 1863)
- Colotis vesta hanningtoni (Butler, 1883)
- Colotis vesta princeps Talbot, 1939
- Eronia cleodora Hübner, 1823
- Pinacopterix eriphia melanarge (Butler, 1886)
- Pinacopterix eriphia wittei Berger, 1940
- Nepheronia argia argia (Fabricius, 1775)
- Nepheronia argia argolisia (Stoneham, 1957)
- Nepheronia pharis pharis (Boisduval, 1836)
- Nepheronia pharis silvanus (Stoneham, 1957)
- Nepheronia thalassina sinalata (Suffert, 1904)
- Nepheronia thalassina verulanus (Ward, 1871)
- Leptosia alcesta inalcesta Bernardi, 1959
- Leptosia alcesta pseudonuptilla Bernardi, 1959
- Leptosia hybrida somereni Bernardi, 1959
- Leptosia marginea (Mabille, 1890)
- Leptosia nupta pseudonupta Bernardi, 1959
- Leptosia wigginsi (Dixey, 1915)

==== Pierini ====
- Appias epaphia (Cramer, [1779])
- Appias phaola intermedia Dufrane, 1948
- Appias sabina (Felder & Felder, [1865])
- Appias sylvia nyasana (Butler, 1897)
- Pontia helice johnstonii (Crowley, 1887)
- Mylothris agathina richlora Suffert, 1904
- Mylothris alberici Dufrane, 1940
- Mylothris asphodelus Butler, 1888
- Mylothris bernice berenicides Holland, 1896
- Mylothris chloris clarissa Butler, 1888
- Mylothris citrina orientalis Talbot, 1946
- Mylothris continua Talbot, 1944
- Mylothris croceus Butler, 1896
- Mylothris hilara goma Berger, 1981
- Mylothris jacksoni Sharpe, 1891
- Mylothris kiwuensis rhodopoides Talbot, 1944
- Mylothris kiwuensis katera Berger, 1979
- Mylothris mafuga Berger, 1981
- Mylothris nubila somereni Talbot, 1946
- Mylothris rhodope (Fabricius, 1775)
- Mylothris ruandana Strand, 1909
- Mylothris rubricosta (Mabille, 1890)
- Mylothris rueppellii tirikensis Neave, 1904
- Mylothris schumanni uniformis Talbot, 1944
- Mylothris similis noel Talbot, 1944
- Mylothris sjostedti hecqui Berger, 1952
- Mylothris subsolana Hecq, 2001
- Mylothris yulei latimargo Joicey & Talbot, 1921
- Dixeia dixeyi (Neave, 1904)
- Dixeia doxo costata Talbot, 1943
- Dixeia orbona vidua (Butler, 1900)
- Belenois aurota (Fabricius, 1793)
- Belenois calypso minor Talbot, 1943
- Belenois calypso crawshayi Butler, 1894
- Belenois creona severina (Stoll, 1781)
- Belenois gidica abyssinica (Lucas, 1852)
- Belenois raffrayi extendens (Joicey & Talbot, 1927)
- Belenois rubrosignata kongwana Talbot, 1943
- Belenois solilucis loveni (Aurivillius, 1921)
- Belenois subeida subeida (Felder & Felder, 1865)
- Belenois subeida sylvander Grose-Smith, 1890
- Belenois sudanensis katalensis Berger, 1981
- Belenois theora laeta (Weymer, 1903)
- Belenois theuszi (Dewitz, 1889)
- Belenois thysa meldolae Butler, 1872
- Belenois victoria victoria Dixey, 1915
- Belenois victoria schoutedeni Berger, 1953
- Belenois zochalia agrippinides (Holland, 1896)

== Lycaenidae ==
=== Miletinae ===
==== Liphyrini ====
- Euliphyra leucyania (Hewitson, 1874)
- Aslauga karamoja (Libert, 1994) (endemic)
- Aslauga lamborni Bethune-Baker, 1914
- Aslauga marshalli Butler, 1899
- Aslauga pandora Druce, 1913
- Aslauga purpurascens Holland, 1890

==== Miletini ====
- Megalopalpus metaleucus Karsch, 1893
- Megalopalpus simplex Röber, 1886
- Megalopalpus zymna (Westwood, 1851)
- Spalgis jacksoni Stempffer, 1967
- Spalgis lemolea Druce, 1890
- Lachnocnema bibulus (Fabricius, 1793)
- Lachnocnema pseudobibulus Libert, 1996
- Lachnocnema sosia Libert, 1996
- Lachnocnema durbani Trimen & Bowker, 1887
- Lachnocnema abyssinica Libert, 1996
- Lachnocnema triangularis Libert, 1996
- Lachnocnema jacksoni Stempffer, 1967
- Lachnocnema emperamus (Snellen, 1872)
- Lachnocnema divergens Gaede, 1915
- Lachnocnema vuattouxi Libert, 1996
- Lachnocnema reutlingeri perspicua Libert, 1996
- Lachnocnema luna Druce, 1910
- Lachnocnema brunea Libert, 1996
- Lachnocnema magna Aurivillius, 1895
- Lachnocnema exiguus Holland, 1890
- Lachnocnema disrupta Talbot, 1935

=== Poritiinae ===
==== Liptenini ====
- Alaena caissa kagera Talbot, 1935
- Alaena subrubra Bethune-Baker, 1915
- Ptelina carnuta (Hewitson, 1873)
- Pentila alba Dewitz, 1886
- Pentila cloetensi albida Hawker-Smith, 1933
- Pentila cloetensi catauga Rebel, 1914
- Pentila glagoessa (Holland, 1893)
- Pentila inconspicua Druce, 1910
- Pentila pauli clarensis Neave, 1903
- Pentila tachyroides Dewitz, 1879
- Pentila umangiana connectens Hulstaert, 1924
- Liptenara hiendlmayri (Dewitz, 1887)
- Telipna sulpitia Hulstaert, 1924
- Telipna aurivillii jefferyi Jackson, 1969
- Telipna kayonza Jackson, 1969 (endemic)
- Telipna citrimaculata neavei Bethune-Baker, 1926
- Telipna citrimaculata victoriae Libert, 2005
- Telipna sheffieldi Bethune-Baker, 1926 (endemic)
- Telipna sanguinea depuncta Talbot, 1937
- Telipna consanguinea consanguinea Rebel, 1914
- Telipna consanguinea ugandae Behune-Baker, 1926
- Telipna nyanza nyanza Neave, 1904
- Telipna nyanza katangae Stempffer, 1961
- Ornipholidotos ugandae Stempffer, 1947
- Ornipholidotos teroensis Stempffer, 1957
- Ornipholidotos katangae reducta Libert, 2005
- Ornipholidotos amieti angulata Libert, 2005
- Ornipholidotos overlaeti intermedia Libert, 2005
- Ornipholidotos gemina fournierae Libert, 2005
- Ornipholidotos josianae Libert, 2005 (endemic)
- Ornipholidotos jacksoni Stempffer, 1961
- Ornipholidotos ntebi (Bethune-Baker, 1906)
- Ornipholidotos latimargo (Hawker-Smith, 1933)
- Ornipholidotos paradoxa orientis Libert, 2005
- Ornipholidotos peucetia (Hewitson, 1866)
- Mimacraea krausei krausei Dewitz, 1889
- Mimacraea krausei poultoni Neave, 1904
- Mimacraea landbecki Druce, 1910
- Mimacraea marshalli Trimen, 1898
- Mimacraea eltringhami Druce, 1912
- Mimeresia debora barnsi (Hawker-Smith, 1933)
- Mimeresia dinora discirubra (Talbot, 1937)
- Mimeresia drucei ugandae (Stempffer, 1954)
- Mimeresia favillacea griseata (Talbot, 1937)
- Mimeresia moreelsi purpurea (Hawker-Smith, 1933)
- Mimeresia neavei (Joicey & Talbot, 1921)
- Mimeresia russulus unyoro Stempffer, 1961
- Liptena albomacula Hawker-Smith, 1933
- Liptena amabilis nyanzae Congdon, Kielland & Collins, 1998
- Liptena augusta Suffert, 1904
- Liptena batesana Bethune-Baker, 1926
- Liptena congoana Hawker-Smith, 1933
- Liptena despecta (Holland, 1890)
- Liptena eukrinoides Talbot, 1937
- Liptena flavicans aequatorialis Stempffer, 1956
- Liptena flavicans katera Stempffer, 1956
- Liptena hapale Talbot, 1935
- Liptena modesta (Kirby, 1890)
- Liptena nigromarginata Stempffer, 1961
- Liptena opaca ugandana Stempffer, Bennett & May, 1974
- Liptena orubrum teroana Talbot, 1935
- Liptena praestans congoensis Schultze, 1923
- Liptena rubromacula jacksoni Carpenter, 1934
- Liptena turbata (Kirby, 1890)
- Liptena xanthostola xantha (Grose-Smith, 1901)
- Kakumia ideoides (Dewitz, 1887)
- Kakumia otlauga (Grose-Smith & Kirby, 1890)
- Tetrarhanis ilala (Riley, 1929)
- Tetrarhanis ilma daltoni (Poulton, 1929)
- Tetrarhanis ilma ugandae (Stempffer, 1964)
- Tetrarhanis stempfferi kigezi (Stempffer, 1956)
- Falcuna iturina Stempffer & Bennett, 1963
- Falcuna orientalis orientalis (Bethune-Baker, 1906)
- Falcuna orientalis bwamba Stempffer & Bennett, 1963
- Falcuna overlaeti Stempffer & Bennett, 1963
- Larinopoda lagyra (Hewitson, 1866)
- Larinopoda lircaea (Hewitson, 1866)
- Larinopoda tera (Hewitson, 1873)
- Micropentila bunyoro Stempffer & Bennett, 1965
- Micropentila cherereti Stempffer & Bennett, 1965
- Micropentila fontainei Stempffer & Bennett, 1965
- Micropentila jacksoni Talbot, 1937
- Micropentila katerae Stempffer & Bennett, 1965
- Micropentila mpigi Stempffer & Bennett, 1965
- Micropentila subplagata Bethune-Baker, 1915
- Micropentila ugandae Hawker-Smith, 1933
- Micropentila victoriae Stempffer & Bennett, 1965
- Pseuderesia eleaza katera Stempffer, 1961
- Pseuderesia mapongua (Holland, 1893)
- Eresina bergeri Stempffer, 1956
- Eresina bilinea Talbot, 1935
- Eresina conradti Stempffer, 1956
- Eresina crola Talbot, 1935
- Eresina fontainei Stempffer, 1956
- Eresina jacksoni Stempffer, 1961
- Eresina katera Stempffer, 1962
- Eresina masaka Stempffer, 1962
- Eresina rougeoti Stempffer, 1956
- Eresina toroensis Joicey & Talbot, 1921
- Eresiomera magnimacula (Rebel, 1914)
- Eresiomera paradoxa orientalis (Stempffer, 1962)
- Eresiomera rougeoti (Stempffer, 1961)
- Eresiomera rutilo (Druce, 1910)
- Citrinophila erastus pallida Hawker-Smith, 1933
- Citrinophila tenera (Kirby, 1887)
- Citrinophila unipunctata Bethune-Baker, 1908
- Argyrocheila inundifera Hawker-Smith, 1933
- Argyrocheila ugandae Hawker-Smith, 1933

==== Epitolini ====
- Toxochitona ankole Stempffer, 1967 (endemic)
- Toxochitona gerda (Kirby, 1890)
- Toxochitona sankuru Stempffer, 1961
- Toxochitona vansomereni (Stempffer, 1954) (endemic)
- Iridana bwamba Stempffer, 1964 (endemic)
- Iridana hypocala Eltringham, 1929
- Iridana incredibilis (Staudinger, 1891)
- Iridana jacksoni Stempffer, 1964
- Iridana katera Stempffer, 1964
- Iridana marina Talbot, 1935
- Iridana obscura Stempffer, 1964 (endemic)
- Iridana perdita (Kirby, 1890)
- Iridana tororo Stempffer, 1964
- Iridana unyoro Stempffer, 1964
- Teratoneura congoensis Stempffer, 1954
- Epitola urania Kirby, 1887
- Epitola uranioides uranoides Libert, 1999
- Cerautola ceraunia (Hewitson, 1873)
- Cerautola crippsi (Stoneham, 1934)
- Cerautola crowleyi holochroma (Berger, 1981)
- Cerautola miranda vidua (Talbot, 1935)
- Cerautola semibrunnea (Bethune-Baker, 1916)
- Geritola cyanea (Jackson, 1964)
- Geritola dubia (Jackson, 1964)
- Geritola gerina (Hewitson, 1878)
- Geritola goodii (Holland, 1890)
- Geritola liana (Roche, 1954)
- Geritola zelica (Kirby, 1890)
- Geritola subargentea (Jackson, 1964)
- Stempfferia badura contrasta Libert, 1999
- Stempfferia carilla (Roche, 1954) (endemic)
- Stempfferia cercene (Hewitson, 1873)
- Stempfferia cercenoides (Holland, 1890)
- Stempfferia ciconia mongiro (Jackson, 1968)
- Stempfferia insulana (Aurivillius, 1923)
- Stempfferia mara (Talbot, 1935)
- Stempfferia marginata (Kirby, 1887)
- Stempfferia sylviae Libert, 1999
- Cephetola bwamba (Jackson, 1964) (endemic)
- Cephetola catuna catuna (Kirby, 1890)
- Cephetola catuna carpenteri (Bethune-Baker, 1922)
- Cephetola cephena entebbeana (Bethune-Baker, 1926)
- Cephetola dolorosa (Roche, 1954)
- Cephetola kamengensis (Jackson, 1962)
- Cephetola katerae (Jackson, 1962)
- Cephetola kiellandi (Libert & Congdon, 1998)
- Cephetola maculata (Hawker-Smith, 1926)
- Cephetola mariae Libert, 1999
- Cephetola martini (Libert, 1998)
- Cephetola mengoensis (Bethune-Baker, 1906)
- Cephetola mpangensis (Jackson, 1962)
- Cephetola nigra (Bethune-Baker, 1903)
- Cephetola orientalis (Roche, 1954)
- Cephetola pinodes budduana (Talbot, 1937)
- Cephetola subgriseata (Jackson, 1964)
- Cephetola sublustris (Bethune-Baker, 1904)
- Cephetola vinalli (Talbot, 1935)
- Cephetola viridana (Joicey & Talbot, 1921)
- Deloneura ochrascens (Neave, 1904)
- Neaveia lamborni orientalis Jackson, 1962
- Epitolina dispar (Kirby, 1887)
- Epitolina melissa (Druce, 1888)
- Epitolina catori ugandae Jackson, 1962
- Hypophytala vansomereni (Jackson, 1964)
- Phytala elais ugandae Jackson, 1964
- Neoepitola barombiensis (Kirby, 1890)
- Aethiopana honorius (Fabricius, 1793)
- Hewitsonia inexpectata Bouyer, 1997
- Hewitsonia kuehnei Collins & Larsen, 2008
- Hewitsonia intermedia Jackson, 1962
- Hewitsonia ugandae Jackson, 1962
- Powellana cottoni Bethune-Baker, 1908

=== Aphnaeinae ===
- Pseudaletis agrippina Druce, 1888
- Pseudaletis busoga van Someren, 1939
- Pseudaletis antimachus (Staudinger, 1888)
- Lipaphnaeus aderna pan (Talbot, 1935)
- Lipaphnaeus leonina paradoxa (Schultze, 1908)
- Lipaphnaeus leonina loxura (Rebel, 1914)
- Chloroselas esmeralda Butler, 1886
- Chloroselas pseudozeritis umbrosa Jackson, 1966
- Cigaritis apelles (Oberthür, 1878)
- Cigaritis avriko (Karsch, 1893)
- Cigaritis brunnea (Jackson, 1966)
- Cigaritis crustaria (Holland, 1890)
- Cigaritis homeyeri (Dewitz, 1887)
- Cigaritis nilus (Hewitson, 1865)
- Cigaritis nyassae (Butler, 1884)
- Cigaritis tavetensis (Lathy, 1906)
- Zeritis neriene Boisduval, 1836
- Axiocerses harpax ugandana Clench, 1963
- Axiocerses amanga (Westwood, 1881)
- Aphnaeus argyrocyclus Holland, 1890
- Aphnaeus chapini ugandae Stempffer, 1961
- Aphnaeus coronae Talbot, 1935
- Aphnaeus gilloni Stempffer, 1966
- Aphnaeus jacksoni Stempffer, 1954
- Aphnaeus jefferyi Hawker-Smith, 1928
- Aphnaeus nyanzae Stempffer, 1954 (endemic)
- Aphnaeus orcas (Drury, 1782)

=== Theclinae ===
- Myrina sharpei Bethune-Baker, 1906
- Myrina silenus (Fabricius, 1775)
- Myrina subornata Lathy, 1903
- Oxylides albata (Aurivillius, 1895)
- Oxylides feminina (Sharpe, 1904)
- Dapidodigma demeter nuptus Clench, 1961
- Hypolycaena antifaunus latimacula (Joicey & Talbot, 1921)
- Hypolycaena dubia Aurivillius, 1895
- Hypolycaena hatita ugandae Sharpe, 1904
- Hypolycaena jacksoni Bethune-Baker, 1906
- Hypolycaena kadiskos Druce, 1890
- Hypolycaena lebona davenporti Larsen, 1997
- Hypolycaena liara Druce, 1890
- Hypolycaena obscura Stempffer, 1947
- Hypolycaena nigra Bethune-Baker, 1914
- Hypolycaena pachalica Butler, 1888
- Leptomyrina makala Bethune-Baker, 1908
- Leptomyrina gorgias cana Talbot, 1935
- Iolaus bolissus aurora Clench, 1964
- Iolaus alienus ugandae Stempffer, 1953
- Iolaus aurivillii Röber, 1900
- Iolaus bansana yalae (Riley, 1928)
- Iolaus bellina exquisita (Riley, 1928)
- Iolaus creta Hewitson, 1878
- Iolaus farquharsoni (Bethune-Baker, 1922)
- Iolaus fontainei (Stempffer, 1956)
- Iolaus hemicyanus Sharpe, 1904
- Iolaus iasis albomaculatus Sharpe, 1904
- Iolaus maesa (Hewitson, 1862)
- Iolaus mafugae (Stempffer & Bennett, 1959)
- Iolaus mimosae haemus (Talbot, 1935)
- Iolaus mongiro Stempffer, 1969 (endemic)
- Iolaus nasisii (Riley, 1928)
- Iolaus neavei katera Talbot, 1937
- Iolaus pollux albocaerulea (Riley, 1929)
- Iolaus pseudofrater Stempffer, 1962 (endemic)
- Iolaus pseudopollux Stempffer, 1962 (endemic)
- Iolaus scintillans Aurivillius, 1905
- Iolaus sibella (Druce, 1910)
- Iolaus sidus Trimen, 1864
- Iolaus stenogrammica (Riley, 1928)
- Iolaus tajoraca Walker, 1870
- Iolaus trimeni Wallengren, 1875
- Iolaus menas tatiana (d'Abrera, 1980)
- Iolaus henryi (Stempffer, 1961)
- Iolaus gabunica (Riley, 1928)
- Iolaus iulus Hewitson, 1869
- Iolaus jamesoni (Druce, 1891)
- Iolaus parasilanus divaricatus (Riley, 1928)
- Iolaus ismenias (Klug, 1834)
- Iolaus vansomereni (Stempffer & Bennett, 1958) (endemic)
- Iolaus poecilaon (Riley, 1928)
- Iolaus aequatorialis (Stempffer & Bennett, 1958)
- Iolaus cottrelli (Stempffer & Bennett, 1958)
- Iolaus crawshayi elgonae (Stempffer & Bennett, 1958)
- Iolaus crawshayi niloticus (Stempffer & Bennett, 1958)
- Iolaus iturensis (Joicey & Talbot, 1921)
- Iolaus kayonza (Stempffer & Bennett, 1958) (endemic)
- Iolaus lalos kigezi (Stempffer & Bennett, 1958)
- Iolaus timon orientius Hulstaert, 1924
- Iolaus catori cottoni Bethune-Baker, 1908
- Stugeta marmoreus marmoreus (Butler, 1866)
- Stugeta marmoreus olalae Stoneham, 1934
- Pilodeudorix baginei (Collins & Larsen, 1991)
- Pilodeudorix ula (Karsch, 1895)
- Pilodeudorix virgata (Druce, 1891)
- Pilodeudorix anetia (Hulstaert, 1924)
- Pilodeudorix aruma pallidior Libert, 2004
- Pilodeudorix azurea (Stempffer, 1964)
- Pilodeudorix canescens (Joicey & Talbot, 1921)
- Pilodeudorix infuscata (Stempffer, 1964)
- Pilodeudorix leonina indentata Libert, 2004
- Pilodeudorix mera mera (Hewitson, 1873
- Pilodeudorix mera kinumbensis (Dufrane, 1945)
- Pilodeudorix nyanzana (Stempffer, 1957)
- Pilodeudorix otraeda genuba (Hewitson, 1875)
- Pilodeudorix ankoleensis (Stempffer, 1953) (endemic)
- Pilodeudorix camerona katanga (Clench, 1965)
- Pilodeudorix congoana orientalis (Stempffer, 1957)
- Pilodeudorix kohli (Aurivillius, 1921)
- Pilodeudorix zela (Hewitson, 1869)
- Pilodeudorix zeloides (Butler, 1901)
- Pilodeudorix zelomina (Rebel, 1914)
- Pilodeudorix hugoi Libert, 2004
- Pilodeudorix deritas (Hewitson, 1874)
- Pilodeudorix fumata (Stempffer, 1954)
- Pilodeudorix pasteon (Druce, 1910)
- Pilodeudorix pseudoderitas (Stempffer, 1964)
- Pilodeudorix violetta (Aurivillius, 1897)
- Paradeudorix cobaltina (Stempffer, 1964)
- Paradeudorix ituri ugandae (Talbot, 1935)
- Paradeudorix marginata (Stempffer, 1962)
- Hypomyrina nomenia extensa Libert, 2004
- Hypomyrina mimetica Libert, 2004
- Hypomyrina fournierae Gabriel, 1939
- Deudorix caliginosa Lathy, 1903
- Deudorix dinochares Grose-Smith, 1887
- Deudorix dinomenes diomedes Jackson, 1966
- Deudorix diocles Hewitson, 1869
- Deudorix edwardsi Gabriel, 1939
- Deudorix jacksoni Talbot, 1935
- Deudorix kayonza Stempffer, 1956
- Deudorix livia (Klug, 1834)
- Deudorix lorisona lorisona (Hewitson, 1862)
- Deudorix lorisona baronica Ungemach, 1932
- Deudorix lorisona sesse Stempffer & Jackson, 1962
- Deudorix odana Druce, 1887
- Deudorix suk Stempffer, 1948
- Capys catharus rileyi Stempffer, 1967

=== Polyommatinae ===
==== Lycaenesthini ====
- Anthene afra (Bethune-Baker, 1910)
- Anthene alberta (Bethune-Baker, 1910)
- Anthene butleri (Oberthür, 1880)
- Anthene contrastata mashuna (Stevenson, 1937)
- Anthene contrastata turkana Stempffer, 1936
- Anthene crawshayi crawshayi (Butler, 1899)
- Anthene crawshayi minuta (Bethune-Baker, 1916)
- Anthene definita (Butler, 1899)
- Anthene hobleyi elgonensis (Aurivillius, 1925)
- Anthene hobleyi kigezi Stempffer, 1961
- Anthene hodsoni (Talbot, 1935)
- Anthene indefinita (Bethune-Baker, 1910)
- Anthene irumu (Stempffer, 1948)
- Anthene ituria (Bethune-Baker, 1910)
- Anthene kampala (Bethune-Baker, 1910)
- Anthene katera Talbot, 1937
- Anthene kersteni (Gerstaecker, 1871)
- Anthene lachares toroensis Stempffer, 1947
- Anthene larydas (Cramer, 1780)
- Anthene ligures (Hewitson, 1874)
- Anthene liodes (Hewitson, 1874)
- Anthene kikuyu (Bethune-Baker, 1910)
- Anthene rubricinctus jeanneli Stempffer, 1961
- Anthene ruwenzoricus (Grünberg, 1911)
- Anthene schoutedeni (Hulstaert, 1924)
- Anthene scintillula (Holland, 1891)
- Anthene sylvanus albicans (Grünberg, 1910)
- Anthene talboti Stempffer, 1936
- Anthene wilsoni (Talbot, 1935)
- Anthene zenkeri (Karsch, 1895)
- Anthene kalinzu (Stempffer, 1950)
- Anthene quadricaudata (Bethune-Baker, 1926)
- Anthene chryseostictus (Bethune-Baker, 1910)
- Anthene gemmifera (Neave, 1910)
- Anthene lusones (Hewitson, 1874)
- Anthene staudingeri (Grose-Smith & Kirby, 1894)
- Anthene hades (Bethune-Baker, 1910)
- Anthene inconspicua (Druce, 1910)
- Anthene kamilila (Bethune-Baker, 1910)
- Anthene lamias katerae (d'Abrera, 1980)
- Anthene lucretilis albipicta (Talbot, 1935)
- Anthene nigeriae (Aurivillius, 1905)
- Anthene rufoplagata (Bethune-Baker, 1910)
- Cupidesthes arescopa orientalis (Stempffer, 1962)
- Cupidesthes eliasi Congdon, Kielland & Collins, 1998
- Cupidesthes leonina (Bethune-Baker, 1903)
- Cupidesthes lithas (Druce, 1890)
- Cupidesthes ysobelae Jackson, 1966
- Lycaena phlaeas ethiopica (Poulton, 1922)

==== Polyommatini ====
- Cupidopsis jobates (Hopffer, 1855)
- Pseudonacaduba aethiops (Mabille, 1877)
- Uranothauma antinorii felthami (Stevenson, 1934)
- Uranothauma cordatus (Sharpe, 1892)
- Uranothauma cuneatum Tite, 1958
- Uranothauma delatorum Heron, 1909
- Uranothauma falkensteini (Dewitz, 1879)
- Uranothauma heritsia intermedia (Tite, 1958)
- Uranothauma lunifer (Rebel, 1914)
- Uranothauma poggei (Dewitz, 1879)
- Phlyaria cyara tenuimarginata (Grünberg, 1908)
- Cacyreus audeoudi Stempffer, 1936
- Cacyreus tespis (Herbst, 1804)
- Cacyreus virilis Stempffer, 1936
- Harpendyreus marungensis wollastoni (Bethune-Baker, 1926)
- Harpendyreus reginaldi Heron, 1909
- Leptotes marginalis (Stempffer, 1944)
- Tuxentius cretosus usemia (Neave, 1904)
- Tuxentius margaritaceus (Sharpe, 1892)
- Tarucus balkanicus (Freyer, 1843)
- Tarucus legrasi Stempffer, 1948
- Tarucus rosacea (Austaut, 1885)
- Tarucus theophrastus (Fabricius, 1793)
- Tarucus ungemachi Stempffer, 1942
- Actizera stellata (Trimen, 1883)
- Azanus isis (Drury, 1773)
- Azanus natalensis (Trimen & Bowker, 1887)
- Eicochrysops distractus (de Joannis & Verity, 1913)
- Eicochrysops masai (Bethune-Baker, 1905)
- Eicochrysops messapus nandiana (Bethune-Baker, 1906)
- Euchrysops alberta (Butler, 1901)
- Euchrysops albistriata (Capronnier, 1889)
- Euchrysops barkeri (Trimen, 1893)
- Euchrysops brunneus Bethune-Baker, 1923
- Euchrysops crawshayi (Butler, 1899)
- Euchrysops kabrosae (Bethune-Baker, 1906)
- Euchrysops nilotica (Aurivillius, 1904)
- Euchrysops osiris (Hopffer, 1855)
- Euchrysops reducta Hulstaert, 1924
- Euchrysops severini Hulstaert, 1924
- Euchrysops subpallida Bethune-Baker, 1923
- Thermoniphas alberici (Dufrane, 1945)
- Thermoniphas albocaerulea Stempffer, 1956 (endemic)
- Thermoniphas caerulea Stempffer, 1956 (endemic)
- Thermoniphas distincta (Talbot, 1935)
- Thermoniphas fumosa Stempffer, 1952
- Thermoniphas plurilimbata plurilimbata Karsch, 1895
- Thermoniphas plurilimbata rutshurensis (Joicey & Talbot, 1921)
- Thermoniphas togara togara (Plötz, 1880)
- Thermoniphas togara bugalla Stempffer & Jackson, 1962
- Thermoniphas kigezi Stempffer, 1956 (endemic)
- Oboronia albicosta (Gaede, 1916)
- Oboronia guessfeldti (Dewitz, 1879)
- Oboronia ornata vestalis (Aurivillius, 1895)
- Oboronia pseudopunctatus (Strand, 1912)
- Oboronia punctatus (Dewitz, 1879)
- Chilades naidina (Butler, 1886)
- Lepidochrysops budama van Someren, 1957 (endemic)
- Lepidochrysops jacksoni van Someren, 1957 (endemic)
- Lepidochrysops labwor van Someren, 1957 (endemic)
- Lepidochrysops loveni (Aurivillius, 1922)
- Lepidochrysops neonegus borealis van Someren, 1957
- Lepidochrysops polydialecta (Bethune-Baker, [1923])
- Lepidochrysops pterou (Bethune-Baker, [1923])
- Lepidochrysops victoriae occidentalis Libert & Collins, 2001

== Riodinidae ==
=== Nemeobiinae ===
- Abisara caeca Rebel, 1914
- Abisara rutherfordii cyclops Riley, 1932
- Abisara rogersi simulacris Riley, 1932
- Abisara neavei Riley, 1932

== Nymphalidae ==
=== Libytheinae ===
- Libythea labdaca Westwood, 1851

=== Danainae ===
==== Danaini ====
- Danaus chrysippus chrysippus (Linnaeus, 1758)
- Danaus chrysippus alcippus (Cramer, 1777)
- Danaus chrysippus orientis (Aurivillius, 1909)
- Danaus dorippus (Klug, 1845)
- Tirumala formosa mercedonia (Karsch, 1894)
- Amauris niavius niavius (Linnaeus, 1758)
- Amauris niavius aethiops Rothschild & Jordan, 1903
- Amauris tartarea Mabille, 1876
- Amauris albimaculata magnimacula Rebel, 1914
- Amauris crawshayi oscarus Thurau, 1904
- Amauris echeria jacksoni Sharpe, 1892
- Amauris echeria mongallensis Carpenter, 1928
- Amauris echeria terrena Talbot, 1940
- Amauris ellioti ellioti Butler, 1895
- Amauris ellioti ansorgei Sharpe, 1896
- Amauris hecate (Butler, 1866)
- Amauris inferna grogani Sharpe, 1901
- Amauris inferna uganda Talbot, 1940

=== Satyrinae ===
==== Elymniini ====
- Elymniopsis bammakoo rattrayi (Sharpe, 1902)

==== Melanitini ====
- Gnophodes betsimena parmeno Doubleday, 1849
- Gnophodes chelys (Fabricius, 1793)
- Gnophodes grogani Sharpe, 1901
- Melanitis ansorgei Rothschild, 1904
- Melanitis libya Distant, 1882
- Aphysoneura pigmentaria pringlei (Sharpe, 1894)
- Aphysoneura scapulifascia kigeziae Kielland, 1989

==== Satyrini ====
- Bicyclus alboplaga (Rebel, 1914)
- Bicyclus analis (Aurivillius, 1895)
- Bicyclus angulosa (Butler, 1868)
- Bicyclus anynana centralis Condamin, 1968
- Bicyclus auricruda fulgidus Fox, 1963
- Bicyclus aurivillii (Butler, 1896)
- Bicyclus buea (Strand, 1912)
- Bicyclus campus (Karsch, 1893)
- Bicyclus dentata (Sharpe, 1898)
- Bicyclus dubia (Aurivillius, 1893)
- Bicyclus ena (Hewitson, 1877)
- Bicyclus golo (Aurivillius, 1893)
- Bicyclus graueri (Rebel, 1914)
- Bicyclus hyperanthus (Bethune-Baker, 1908)
- Bicyclus iccius (Hewitson, 1865)
- Bicyclus ignobilis acutus Condamin, 1965
- Bicyclus istaris (Plötz, 1880)
- Bicyclus jefferyi Fox, 1963
- Bicyclus kenia (Rogenhofer, 1891)
- Bicyclus mandanes Hewitson, 1873
- Bicyclus matuta (Karsch, 1894)
- Bicyclus mesogena ugandae (Riley, 1926)
- Bicyclus milyas (Hewitson, 1864)
- Bicyclus mollitia (Karsch, 1895)
- Bicyclus nachtetis Condamin, 1965
- Bicyclus neustetteri (Rebel, 1914)
- Bicyclus pavonis (Butler, 1876)
- Bicyclus persimilis (Joicey & Talbot, 1921)
- Bicyclus procora (Karsch, 1893)
- Bicyclus rhacotis (Hewitson, 1866)
- Bicyclus sambulos cyaneus Condamin, 1961
- Bicyclus martius sanaos (Hewitson, 1866)
- Bicyclus sandace (Hewitson, 1877)
- Bicyclus saussurei angustus Condamin, 1970
- Bicyclus sebetus (Hewitson, 1877)
- Bicyclus smithi (Aurivillius, 1899)
- Bicyclus sophrosyne (Plötz, 1880)
- Bicyclus trilophus jacksoni Condamin, 1961
- Bicyclus vulgaris (Butler, 1868)
- Bicyclus xeneoides Condamin, 1961
- Heteropsis perspicua (Trimen, 1873)
- Heteropsis phaea (Karsch, 1894)
- Heteropsis teratia (Karsch, 1894)
- Heteropsis ubenica ugandica (Kielland, 1994)
- Heteropsis peitho reducta (Libert, 2006)
- Ypthima albida Butler, 1888
- Ypthima antennata van Son, 1955
- Ypthima condamini Kielland, 1982
- Ypthima doleta Kirby, 1880
- Ypthima granulosa Butler, 1883
- Ypthima pupillaris Butler, 1888
- Ypthima recta Overlaet, 1955
- Neocoenyra duplex Butler, 1886
- Neocoenyra fulleborni Thurau, 1903

=== Charaxinae ===
==== Charaxini ====
- Charaxes fulvescens monitor Rothschild, 1900
- Charaxes acuminatus kigezia van Someren, 1963
- Charaxes protoclea nothodes Jordan, 1911
- Charaxes boueti rectans Rothschild & Jordan, 1903
- Charaxes cynthia kinduana Le Cerf, 1923
- Charaxes cynthia parvicaudatus Lathy, 1925
- Charaxes lucretius maximus van Someren, 1971
- Charaxes lactetinctus Karsch, 1892
- Charaxes saturnus Butler, 1865
- Charaxes epijasius
- Charaxes hansali baringana Rothschild, 1905
- Charaxes castor (Cramer, 1775)
- Charaxes brutus angustus Rothschild, 1900
- Charaxes ansorgei ansorgei Rothschild, 1897
- Charaxes ansorgei ruandana Talbot, 1932
- Charaxes pollux (Cramer, 1775)
- Charaxes druceanus obscura Rebel, 1914
- Charaxes druceanus septentrionalis Lathy, 1925
- Charaxes eudoxus cabacus Jordan, 1925
- Charaxes eudoxus katerae Carpenter, 1937
- Charaxes eudoxus mechowi Rothschild, 1900
- Charaxes numenes aequatorialis van Someren, 1972
- Charaxes tiridates tiridatinus Röber, 1936
- Charaxes bipunctatus ugandensis van Someren, 1972
- Charaxes smaragdalis caerulea Jackson, 1951
- Charaxes smaragdalis elgonae van Someren, 1964
- Charaxes smaragdalis metu van Someren, 1964
- Charaxes smaragdalis toro van Someren, 1964
- Charaxes xiphares burgessi van Son, 1953
- Charaxes imperialis ugandicus van Someren, 1972
- Charaxes ameliae victoriae van Someren, 1972
- Charaxes pythodoris Hewitson, 1873
- Charaxes hadrianus Ward, 1871
- Charaxes nobilis Druce, 1873
- Charaxes fournierae kigeziensis Howarth, 1969
- Charaxes zingha (Stoll, 1780)
- Charaxes etesipe etesipe (Godart, 1824)
- Charaxes etesipe hercules Turlin & Lequeux, 2002
- Charaxes achaemenes monticola van Someren, 1970
- Charaxes jahlusa ganalensis Carpenter, 1937
- Charaxes eupale latimargo Joicey & Talbot, 1921
- Charaxes subornatus minor Joicey & Talbot, 1921
- Charaxes dilutus ngonga van Someren, 1974
- Charaxes montis Jackson, 1956
- Charaxes anticlea adusta Rothschild, 1900
- Charaxes baumanni bwamba van Someren, 1971
- Charaxes baumanni didingensis van Someren, 1971
- Charaxes baumanni interposita van Someren, 1971
- Charaxes opinatus Heron, 1909
- Charaxes hildebrandti hildebrandti (Dewitz, 1879)
- Charaxes hildebrandti katangensis Talbot, 1928
- Charaxes virilis lenis Henning, 1989
- Charaxes catachrous van Someren & Jackson, 1952
- Charaxes etheocles carpenteri van Someren & Jackson, 1957
- Charaxes ethalion nyanzae van Someren, 1967
- Charaxes mafuga van Someren, 1969
- Charaxes cedreatis Hewitson, 1874
- Charaxes phaeus Hewitson, 1877
- Charaxes viola picta van Someren & Jackson, 1952
- Charaxes kirki suk Carpenter & Jackson, 1950
- Charaxes pleione bebra Rothschild, 1900
- Charaxes paphianus subpallida Joicey & Talbot, 1925
- Charaxes kahldeni Homeyer & Dewitz, 1882
- Charaxes zoolina zoolina (Westwood, [1850])
- Charaxes zoolina mafugensis Jackson, 1956
- Charaxes nichetes nichetes Grose-Smith, 1883
- Charaxes nichetes ssese Turlin & Lequeux, 2002
- Charaxes lycurgus bernardiana Plantrou, 1978
- Charaxes zelica depuncta Joicey & Talbot, 1921
- Charaxes porthos dummeri Joicey & Talbot, 1922
- Charaxes schiltzei Bouyer, 1991

==== Euxanthini ====
- Euxanthe eurinome ansellica (Butler, 1870)
- Euxanthe eurinome birbirica Ungemach, 1932
- Euxanthe crossleyi ansorgei (Rothschild, 1903)
- Euxanthe crossleyi magnifica (Rebel, 1914)
- Euxanthe trajanus vansomereni (Poulton, 1929)

==== Pallini ====
- Palla ussheri interposita Joicey & Talbot, 1925
- Palla violinitens bwamba van Someren, 1975

=== Apaturinae ===
- Apaturopsis cleochares (Hewitson, 1873)

=== Nymphalinae ===
- Kallimoides rumia rattrayi (Sharpe, 1904)
- Vanessula milca latifasciata Joicey & Talbot, 1928

==== Nymphalini ====
- Antanartia delius (Drury, 1782)
- Antanartia schaeneia dubia Howarth, 1966
- Vanessa dimorphica (Howarth, 1966)
- Vanessa abyssinica vansomereni Howarth, 1966
- Junonia chorimene (Guérin-Méneville, 1844)
- Junonia schmiedeli (Fiedler, 1920)
- Junonia sophia infracta Butler, 1888
- Junonia gregorii Butler, 1896
- Junonia terea tereoides (Butler, 1901)
- Junonia westermanni suffusa (Rothschild & Jordan, 1903)
- Junonia ansorgei (Rothschild, 1899)
- Junonia cymodoce lugens (Schultze, 1912)
- Salamis cacta (Fabricius, 1793)
- Protogoniomorpha parhassus (Drury, 1782)
- Protogoniomorpha temora (Felder & Felder, 1867)
- Precis actia Distant, 1880
- Precis archesia ugandensis (McLeod, 1980)
- Precis ceryne (Boisduval, 1847)
- Precis coelestina Dewitz, 1879
- Precis milonia wintgensi Strand, 1909
- Precis octavia sesamus Trimen, 1883
- Precis pelarga (Fabricius, 1775)
- Precis rauana rauana (Grose-Smith, 1898)
- Precis rauana silvicola Schultz, 1916
- Precis sinuata hecqui Berger, 1981
- Precis tugela pyriformis (Butler, 1896)
- Hypolimnas bartelotti Grose-Smith, 1890
- Hypolimnas dinarcha grandis Rothschild, 1918
- Hypolimnas misippus (Linnaeus, 1764)
- Hypolimnas monteironis major Rothschild, 1918
- Hypolimnas salmacis salmacis (Drury, 1773)
- Hypolimnas salmacis magnifica Rothschild, 1918
- Mallika jacksoni (Sharpe, 1896)

=== Cyrestinae ===
==== Cyrestini ====
- Cyrestis camillus (Fabricius, 1781)

=== Biblidinae ===
==== Biblidini ====
- Byblia anvatara crameri Aurivillius, 1894
- Mesoxantha ethosea reducta Rothschild, 1918
- Ariadne albifascia (Joicey & Talbot, 1921)
- Ariadne enotrea suffusa (Joicey & Talbot, 1921)
- Ariadne pagenstecheri (Suffert, 1904)
- Neptidopsis ophione nucleata Grünberg, 1911
- Eurytela dryope angulata Aurivillius, 1899
- Eurytela hiarbas (Drury, 1782)

==== Epicaliini ====
- Sevenia boisduvali omissa (Rothschild, 1918)
- Sevenia garega (Karsch, 1892)
- Sevenia occidentalium (Mabille, 1876)
- Sevenia umbrina (Karsch, 1892)

=== Limenitinae ===
==== Limenitidini ====
- Harma theobene superna (Fox, 1968)
- Cymothoe beckeri theodosia Staudinger, 1890
- Cymothoe caenis (Drury, 1773)
- Cymothoe distincta kivuensis Overlaet, 1952
- Cymothoe confusa Aurivillius, 1887
- Cymothoe haynae diphyia Karsch, 1894
- Cymothoe herminia johnstoni (Butler, 1902)
- Cymothoe hobarti Butler, 1900
- Cymothoe indamora amorinda van Someren, 1939
- Cymothoe jodutta mostinckxi Overlaet, 1952
- Cymothoe lurida butleri Grünberg, 1908
- Cymothoe lurida tristis Overlaet, 1952
- Cymothoe ochreata Grose-Smith, 1890
- Cymothoe reginaeelisabethae Holland, 1920
- Kumothales inexpectata Overlaet, 1940
- Pseudoneptis bugandensis bugandensis Stoneham, 1935
- Pseudoneptis bugandensis ianthe Hemming, 1964
- Pseudacraea boisduvalii (Doubleday, 1845)
- Pseudacraea clarkii Butler & Rothschild, 1892
- Pseudacraea deludens echerioides Talbot, 1941
- Pseudacraea deludens terrena Jackson, 1956
- Pseudacraea dolomena albostriata Lathy, 1906
- Pseudacraea dolomena elgonensis Jackson, 1951
- Pseudacraea dolomena kayonza Jackson, 1956
- Pseudacraea rubrobasalis Aurivillius, 1903
- Pseudacraea eurytus (Linnaeus, 1758)
- Pseudacraea kuenowii burgessi Jackson, 1951
- Pseudacraea kuenowii hypoxantha Jordan, 1911
- Pseudacraea kuenowii kigezi Jackson, 1956
- Pseudacraea lucretia protracta (Butler, 1874)
- Pseudacraea semire (Cramer, 1779)
- Pseudacraea warburgi Aurivillius, 1892

==== Neptidini ====
- Neptis agouale parallela Collins & Larsen, 1996
- Neptis alta Overlaet, 1955
- Neptis carpenteri d'Abrera, 1980
- Neptis clarei Neave, 1904
- Neptis conspicua Neave, 1904
- Neptis constantiae Carcasson, 1961
- Neptis angusta Condamin, 1966
- Neptis continuata Holland, 1892
- Neptis exaleuca suffusa Rothschild, 1918
- Neptis jordani Neave, 1910
- Neptis kiriakoffi Overlaet, 1955
- Neptis lugubris Rebel, 1914
- Neptis melicerta (Drury, 1773)
- Neptis metanira Holland, 1892
- Neptis metella metella (Doubleday, 1848)
- Neptis metella flavimacula Jackson, 1951
- Neptis morosa Overlaet, 1955
- Neptis nemetes nemetes Hewitson, 1868
- Neptis nemetes margueriteae Fox, 1968
- Neptis nicobule Holland, 1892
- Neptis nicomedes Hewitson, 1874
- Neptis quintilla Mabille, 1890
- Neptis nicoteles Hewitson, 1874
- Neptis occidentalis Rothschild, 1918
- Neptis ochracea ochracea Neave, 1904
- Neptis ochracea ochreata Gaede, 1915
- Neptis poultoni Eltringham, 1921
- Neptis puella Aurivillius, 1894
- Neptis seeldrayersi Aurivillius, 1895
- Neptis strigata kakamega Collins & Larsen, 1996
- Neptis trigonophora melicertula Strand, 1912
- Neptis woodwardi Sharpe, 1899

==== Adoliadini ====
- Catuna angustatum (Felder & Felder, 1867)
- Catuna crithea (Drury, 1773)
- Euryphura chalcis (Felder & Felder, 1860)
- Euryphura isuka Stoneham, 1935
- Euryphura plautilla (Hewitson, 1865)
- Pseudargynnis hegemone (Godart, 1819)
- Aterica galene extensa Heron, 1909
- Cynandra opis bernardii Lagnel, 1967
- Euriphene amaranta (Karsch, 1894)
- Euriphene atossa australis d'Abrera, 1980
- Euriphene barombina (Aurivillius, 1894)
- Euriphene butleri (Aurivillius, 1904)
- Euriphene conjungens chalybeata (Talbot, 1937)
- Euriphene excelsior (Rebel, 1911)
- Euriphene jacksoni (Talbot, 1937)
- Euriphene obsoleta (Grünberg, 1908)
- Euriphene ribensis (Ward, 1871)
- Euriphene saphirina (Karsch, 1894)
- Euriphene tadema nigropunctata (Aurivillius, 1901)
- Euriphene doriclea (Drury, 1782)
- Bebearia carshena (Hewitson, 1871)
- Bebearia absolon entebbiae (Lathy, 1906)
- Bebearia zonara (Butler, 1871)
- Bebearia mandinga beni Hecq, 1990
- Bebearia oxione squalida (Talbot, 1928)
- Bebearia abesa pandera Hecq, 1988
- Bebearia partita (Aurivillius, 1895)
- Bebearia barce maculata (Aurivillius, 1912)
- Bebearia cocalia badiana (Rbel, 1914)
- Bebearia cocalia katera (van Someren, 1939)
- Bebearia sophus audeoudi (Riley, 1936)
- Bebearia plistonax (Hewitson, 1874)
- Bebearia brunhilda brunhilda (Kirby, 1889)
- Bebearia brunhilda iturina (Karsch, 1894)
- Bebearia laetitioides (Joicey & Talbot, 1921)
- Bebearia laetitia (Plötz, 1880)
- Bebearia flaminia (Staudinger, 1891)
- Bebearia phantasiella simulata (van Someren, 1939)
- Bebearia aurora kayonza (Jackson, 1956)
- Bebearia chloeropis (Bethune-Baker, 1908)
- Euphaedra medon fraudata van Someren, 1935
- Euphaedra medon inaequabilis Thurau, 1904
- Euphaedra zaddachii crawshayi Butler, 1895
- Euphaedra christyi Sharpe, 1904 (endemic)
- Euphaedra hewitsoni angusta Hecq, 1974
- Euphaedra hollandi Hecq, 1974
- Euphaedra diffusa Gaede, 1916
- Euphaedra caerulescens Grose-Smith, 1890
- Euphaedra imitans Holland, 1893
- Euphaedra eberti hamus Berger, 1940
- Euphaedra viridicaerulea nitidula van Someren, 1935
- Euphaedra uganda Aurivillius, 1895
- Euphaedra preussi Staudinger, 1891
- Euphaedra vicina Hecq, 1984
- Euphaedra procera Hecq, 1984
- Euphaedra margueriteae Hecq, 1978
- Euphaedra olivacea Grünberg, 1908 (endemic)
- Euphaedra paradoxa Neave, 1904
- Euphaedra eleus (Drury, 1782)
- Euphaedra alacris Hecq, 1978
- Euphaedra rattrayi Sharpe, 1904
- Euphaedra edwardsii (van der Hoeven, 1845)
- Euphaedra ruspina (Hewitson, 1865)
- Euphaedra harpalyce spatiosa (Mabille, 1876)
- Euphaedra harpalyce sudanensis Talbot, 1929
- Euphaedra rex Stoneham, 1935
- Euptera elabontas mweruensis Neave, 1910
- Euptera hirundo hirundo Staudinger, 1891
- Euptera hirundo lufirensis Joicey & Talbot, 1921
- Euptera pluto primitiva Hancock, 1984
- Pseudathyma cyrili Chovet, 2002
- Pseudathyma neptidina Karsch, 1894
- Pseudathyma nzoia van Someren, 1939
- Pseudathyma plutonica Butler, 1902

=== Heliconiinae ===
==== Acraeini ====
- Acraea cerasa cerita Sharpe, 1906
- Acraea kraka pallida Carpenter, 1932
- Acraea anemosa Hewitson, 1865
- Acraea eltringhami Joicey & Talbot, 1921
- Acraea endoscota Le Doux, 1928
- Acraea eugenia Karsch, 1893
- Acraea hamata Joicey & Talbot, 1922
- Acraea insignis Distant, 1880
- Acraea leucographa Ribbe, 1889
- Acraea neobule Doubleday, 1847
- Acraea quirina (Fabricius, 1781)
- Acraea zetes (Linnaeus, 1758)
- Acraea rudolfi Eltringham, 1929
- Acraea abdera Hewitson, 1852
- Acraea acrita Hewitson, 1865
- Acraea cepheus (Linnaeus, 1758)
- Acraea egina (Cramer, 1775)
- Acraea guluensis Le Doux, 1932
- Acraea asboloplintha Karsch, 1894
- Acraea braesia Godman, 1885
- Acraea caecilia (Fabricius, 1781)
- Acraea doubledayi Guérin-Méneville, 1849
- Acraea equatorialis Neave, 1904
- Acraea leucopyga Aurivillius, 1904
- Acraea natalica Boisduval, 1847
- Acraea pseudegina Westwood, 1852
- Acraea rogersi lankesteri Carpenter, 1941
- Acraea sykesi Sharpe, 1902
- Acraea aganice orientalis (Ungemach, 1932)
- Acraea aganice ugandae (van Someren, 1936)
- Acraea alcinoe camerunica (Aurivillius, 1893)
- Acraea consanguinea albicolor (Karsch, 1895)
- Acraea epaea angustifasciata (d'Abrera, 1980)
- Acraea epaea lutosa (Suffert, 1904)
- Acraea epaea paragea (Grose-Smith, 1900)
- Acraea formosa (Butler, 1874)
- Acraea macarista (Sharpe, 1906)
- Acraea obliqua elgonense (Poulton, 1927)
- Acraea obliqua kivuensis (Joicey & Talbot, 1927)
- Acraea persanguinea (Rebel, 1914)
- Acraea poggei nelsoni Grose-Smith & Kirby, 1892
- Acraea pseuderyta Godman & Salvin, 1890
- Acraea quadricolor latifasciata (Sharpe, 1892)
- Acraea tellus eumelis (Jordan, 1910)
- Acraea tellus schubotzi (Grünberg, 1911)
- Acraea umbra hemileuca (Jordan, 1914)
- Acraea alciope Hewitson, 1852
- Acraea alciopoides Joicey & Talbot, 1921
- Acraea alicia (Sharpe, 1890)
- Acraea althoffi neavei Poulton, 1924
- Acraea althoffi rubrofasciata Aurivillius, 1895
- Acraea amicitiae Heron, 1909
- Acraea ansorgei Grose-Smith, 1898
- Acraea aurivillii Staudinger, 1896
- Acraea baxteri philos Le Cerf, 1933
- Acraea bonasia (Fabricius, 1775)
- Acraea burgessi Jackson, 1956
- Acraea cabira Hopffer, 1855
- Acraea disjuncta disjuncta Grose-Smith, 1898
- Acraea disjuncta kigeziensis Jackson, 1956
- Acraea serena (Fabricius, 1775)
- Acraea goetzei Thurau, 1903
- Acraea grosvenori Eltringham, 1912
- Acraea humilis Sharpe, 1897
- Acraea iturina Grose-Smith, 1890
- Acraea jodutta (Fabricius, 1793)
- Acraea johnstoni Godman, 1885
- Acraea toruna Grose-Smith, 1900
- Acraea kalinzu Carpenter, 1936
- Acraea lycoa Godart, 1819
- Acraea orestia Hewitson, 1874
- Acraea peneleos pelasgius Grose-Smith, 1900
- Acraea pentapolis Ward, 1871
- Acraea pharsalus Ward, 1871
- Acraea rangatana bettiana Joicey & Talbot, 1921
- Acraea sotikensis Sharpe, 1892
- Acraea uvui Grose-Smith, 1890
- Acraea ventura ochrascens Sharpe, 1902
- Acraea vesperalis Grose-Smith, 1890
- Acraea viviana Staudinger, 1896
- Acraea anacreontica Grose-Smith, 1898
- Acraea wigginsi Neave, 1904
- Acraea cinerea Neave, 1904
- Acraea melanoxantha Sharpe, 1891
- Acraea ntebiae Sharpe, 1897
- Acraea oreas Sharpe, 1891
- Acraea orinata Oberthür, 1893
- Acraea parrhasia servona Godart, 1819
- Acraea penelope Staudinger, 1896
- Acraea perenna Doubleday, 1847
- Acraea quirinalis Grose-Smith, 1900
- Acraea semivitrea Aurivillius, 1895
- Acraea simulata Le Doux, 1923 (endemic)
- Acraea bergeri Gaede, 1915 (endemic)

==== Argynnini ====
- Issoria baumanni excelsior (Butler, 1896)

==== Vagrantini ====
- Lachnoptera anticlia (Hübner, 1819)
- Phalanta eurytis eurytis (Doubleday, 1847)
- Phalanta eurytis microps (Rothschild & Jordan, 1903)
- Phalanta phalantha aethiopica (Rothschild & Jordan, 1903)

== Hesperiidae ==
=== Coeliadinae ===
- Coeliades anchises (Gerstaecker, 1871)
- Coeliades chalybe (Westwood, 1852)
- Coeliades forestan (Stoll, [1782])
- Coeliades hanno (Plötz, 1879)
- Coeliades keithloa menelik (Ungemach, 1932)
- Coeliades pisistratus (Fabricius, 1793)

=== Pyrginae ===
==== Celaenorrhinini ====
- Celaenorrhinus bettoni Butler, 1902
- Celaenorrhinus boadicea howarthi Berger, 1976
- Celaenorrhinus homeyeri (Plötz, 1880)
- Celaenorrhinus illustris daroa Evans, 1937
- Celaenorrhinus intermixtus evansi Berger, 1975
- Celaenorrhinus kivuensis Joicey & Talbot, 1921
- Celaenorrhinus macrostictus Holland, 1893
- Celaenorrhinus meditrina (Hewitson, 1877)
- Celaenorrhinus nigropunctata Bethune-Baker, 1908
- Celaenorrhinus ovalis Evans, 1937
- Celaenorrhinus perlustris Rebel, 1914
- Celaenorrhinus proxima (Mabille, 1877)
- Celaenorrhinus toro Evans, 1937 (endemic)
- Eretis buamba Evans, 1937
- Eretis camerona Evans, 1937
- Eretis herewardi Riley, 1921
- Eretis lugens (Rogenhofer, 1891)
- Eretis melania Mabille, 1891
- Eretis mitiana Evans, 1937
- Eretis umbra maculifera Mabille & Boullet, 1916
- Eretis vaga Evans, 1937
- Sarangesa astrigera Butler, 1894
- Sarangesa bouvieri (Mabille, 1877)
- Sarangesa brigida atra Evans, 1937
- Sarangesa brigida sanaga Miller, 1964
- Sarangesa haplopa Swinhoe, 1907
- Sarangesa laelius (Mabille, 1877)
- Sarangesa maculata (Mabille, 1891)
- Sarangesa tertullianus (Fabricius, 1793)
- Sarangesa thecla mabira Evans, 1956

==== Tagiadini ====
- Tagiades flesus (Fabricius, 1781)
- Eagris decastigma purpura Evans, 1937
- Eagris lucetia (Hewitson, 1875)
- Eagris nottoana (Wallengren, 1857)
- Eagris sabadius astoria Holland, 1896
- Eagris subalbida aurivillii (Neustetter, 1927)
- Eagris tetrastigma (Mabille, 1891)
- Eagris tigris tigris Evans, 1937
- Eagris tigris kayonza Evans, 1956
- Calleagris hollandi (Butler, 1897)
- Calleagris lacteus (Mabille, 1877)
- Procampta rara Holland, 1892
- Caprona adelica Karsch, 1892
- Netrobalane canopus (Trimen, 1864)
- Abantis bismarcki Karsch, 1892
- Abantis contigua Evans, 1937
- Abantis efulensis Holland, 1896
- Abantis leucogaster iruma Evans, 1951
- Abantis lucretia etoumbiensis Miller, 1971
- Abantis paradisea (Butler, 1870)

==== Carcharodini ====
- Spialia colotes semiconfluens de Jong, 1978
- Spialia colotes transvaaliae (Trimen & Bowker, 1889)
- Spialia delagoae (Trimen, 1898)
- Spialia depauperata (Strand, 1911)
- Spialia mangana (Rebel, 1899)
- Spialia ploetzi (Aurivillius, 1891)
- Spialia wrefordi Evans, 1951
- Spialia zebra bifida (Higgins, 1924)

=== Hesperiinae ===
==== Aeromachini ====
- Astictopterus punctulata (Butler, 1895)
- Prosopalpus saga Evans, 1937
- Prosopalpus styla Evans, 1937
- Kedestes brunneostriga (Plötz, 1884)
- Kedestes callicles (Hewitson, 1868)
- Kedestes mohozutza (Wallengren, 1857)
- Kedestes protensa Butler, 1901
- Kedestes rogersi Druce, 1907
- Kedestes wallengrenii (Trimen, 1883)
- Gorgyra afikpo Druce, 1909
- Gorgyra aretina (Hewitson, 1878)
- Gorgyra bibulus Riley, 1929
- Gorgyra bina Evans, 1937
- Gorgyra diversata Evans, 1937
- Gorgyra kalinzu Evans, 1949
- Gorgyra minima Holland, 1896
- Gorgyra mocquerysii Holland, 1896
- Gorgyra pali Evans, 1937
- Teniorhinus ignita (Mabille, 1877)
- Teniorhinus niger (Druce, 1910)
- Ceratrichia argyrosticta enta Evans, 1947
- Ceratrichia aurea Druce, 1910
- Ceratrichia brunnea Bethune-Baker, 1906
- Ceratrichia clara medea Evans, 1937
- Ceratrichia hollandi Bethune-Baker, 1908
- Ceratrichia mabirensis Riley, 1925
- Ceratrichia semilutea Mabille, 1891
- Ceratrichia semlikensis Joicey & Talbot, 1921
- Ceratrichia wollastoni Heron, 1909
- Pardaleodes bule Holland, 1896
- Pardaleodes fan (Holland, 1894)
- Pardaleodes incerta (Snellen, 1872)
- Pardaleodes sator pusiella Mabille, 1877
- Pardaleodes tibullus torensis Bethune-Baker, 1906
- Xanthodisca astrape (Holland, 1892)
- Xanthodisca vibius (Hewitson, 1878)
- Rhabdomantis galatia (Hewitson, 1868)
- Osmodes adonia Evans, 1937
- Osmodes adosus (Mabille, 1890)
- Osmodes costatus Aurivillius, 1896
- Osmodes distincta Holland, 1896
- Osmodes hollandi Evans, 1937
- Osmodes laronia (Hewitson, 1868)
- Osmodes lux Holland, 1892
- Osmodes minchini Evans, 1937 (endemic)
- Osmodes omar Swinhoe, 1916
- Osmodes thora (Plötz, 1884)
- Parosmodes morantii axis Evans, 1937
- Parosmodes onza Evans, 1956 (endemic)
- Paracleros biguttulus (Mabille, 1890)
- Paracleros sangoanus (Carcasson, 1964)
- Acleros mackenii instabilis Mabille, 1890
- Acleros neavei Evans, 1937
- Acleros nigrapex Strand, 1913
- Acleros ploetzi Mabille, 1890
- Semalea arela (Mabille, 1891)
- Semalea pulvina (Plötz, 1879)
- Semalea sextilis (Plötz, 1886)
- Hypoleucis ophiusa ophir Evans, 1937
- Hypoleucis sophia Evans, 1937
- Hypoleucis tripunctata Mabille, 1891
- Meza cybeutes (Holland, 1894)
- Meza indusiata (Mabille, 1891)
- Meza meza (Hewitson, 1877)
- Paronymus budonga (Evans, 1938)
- Paronymus xanthias kiellandi Congdon & Collins, 1998
- Andronymus caesar philander (Hopffer, 1855)
- Andronymus fenestrella Bethune-Baker, 1908
- Andronymus gander Evans, 1947
- Andronymus helles Evans, 1937
- Andronymus marina Evans, 1937
- Andronymus neander (Plötz, 1884)
- Chondrolepis cynthia Evans, 1936
- Chondrolepis leggei (Heron, 1909)
- Chondrolepis niveicornis (Plötz, 1883)
- Zophopetes ganda Evans, 1937
- Zophopetes nobilior (Holland, 1896)
- Gamia buchholzi (Plötz, 1879)
- Gamia shelleyi (Sharpe, 1890)
- Artitropa milleri Riley, 1925
- Artitropa reducta Aurivillius, 1925
- Mopala orma (Plötz, 1879)
- Gretna balenge (Holland, 1891)
- Gretna bugoma Evans, 1947 (endemic)
- Gretna carmen Evans, 1937
- Gretna cylinda (Hewitson, 1876)
- Gretna waga (Plötz, 1886)
- Gretna zaremba jacksoni Evans, 1937
- Pteroteinon caenira (Hewitson, 1867)
- Pteroteinon capronnieri (Plötz, 1879)
- Pteroteinon ceucaenira (Druce, 1910)
- Pteroteinon concaenira Belcastro & Larsen, 1996
- Pteroteinon pruna Evans, 1937
- Leona leonora (Plötz, 1879)
- Leona halma Evans, 1937
- Leona lissa lima Evans, 1937
- Leona luehderi luehderi (Plötz, 1879)
- Leona luehderi laura Evans, 1937
- Caenides kangvensis Holland, 1896
- Caenides xychus (Mabille, 1891)
- Caenides dacela (Hewitson, 1876)
- Caenides dacena (Hewitson, 1876)
- Monza alberti (Holland, 1896)
- Monza cretacea (Snellen, 1872)
- Monza punctata crola Evans, 1937
- Melphina flavina Lindsey & Miller, 1965
- Melphina noctula (Druce, 1909)
- Melphina unistriga (Holland, 1893)
- Fresna carlo Evans, 1937
- Fresna cojo (Karsch, 1893)
- Fresna netopha (Hewitson, 1878)
- Fresna nyassae (Hewitson, 1878)
- Platylesches fosta Evans, 1937
- Platylesches galesa (Hewitson, 1877)
- Platylesches lamba Neave, 1910
- Platylesches moritili (Wallengren, 1857)
- Platylesches panga Evans, 1937
- Platylesches picanini (Holland, 1894)
- Platylesches rasta anka Evans, 1937
- Platylesches tina Evans, 1937

==== Baorini ====
- Zenonia crasta Evans, 1937
- Borbo chagwa (Evans, 1937)
- Borbo fallax (Gaede, 1916)
- Borbo kaka (Evans, 1938)
- Borbo lugens (Hopffer, 1855)
- Borbo perobscura (Druce, 1912)
- Borbo sirena (Evans, 1937)

=== Heteropterinae ===
- Metisella abdeli abdeli (Krüger, 1928)
- Metisella abdeli elgona Evans, 1938
- Metisella alticola (Aurivillius, 1925)
- Metisella formosus nyanza Evans, 1937
- Metisella medea Evans, 1937
- Metisella midas (Butler, 1894)
- Metisella tsadicus (Aurivillius, 1905)
- Metisella willemi (Wallengren, 1857)
- Lepella lepeletier (Latreille, 1824)

== See also ==
- List of moths of Uganda
- Wildlife of Uganda
