= Liptenara =

- Liptenara hiendlmayri - 1st row, 2nd and 3rd images

Scientific classification
- Kingdom: Animalia
- Phylum: Arthropoda
- Clade: Pancrustacea
- Class: Insecta
- Order: Lepidoptera
- Family: Lycaenidae
- Tribe: Liptenini
- Genus: Liptenara; Bethune-Baker, 1915

Butterfly genus in family Lycaenidae

Liptenara is a genus of butterflies in the family Lycaenidae. The three species of this genus are endemic to the Afrotropical realm.

== Species ==
- Liptenara batesi Bethune-Baker, 1915
- Liptenara hiendlmayri (Dewitz, 1887)
- Liptenara schoutedeni (Hawker-Smith, 1926)
