= Liptenara batesi =

Scientific classification
- Domain: Eukaryota
- Kingdom: Animalia
- Phylum: Arthropoda
- Class: Insecta
- Order: Lepidoptera
- Family: Lycaenidae
- Genus: Liptenara
- Species: L. batesi

Binomial name
- Liptenara batesi Bethune-Baker, 1915

Species of butterfly

Liptenara batesi is a butterfly in the family Lycaenidae. It is found in Cameroon and the Democratic Republic of the Congo (Equateur, Tshuapa and Tshopo).
