= Liptenara schoutedeni =

Scientific classification
- Kingdom: Animalia
- Phylum: Arthropoda
- Class: Insecta
- Order: Lepidoptera
- Family: Lycaenidae
- Genus: Liptenara
- Species: L. schoutedeni

Binomial name
- Liptenara schoutedeni (Hawker-Smith, 1926)

Synonyms
- Pentila schoutedeni Hawker-Smith, 1926

Species of butterfly

Liptenara schoutedeni is a butterfly in the family Lycaenidae. It is found in the Democratic Republic of the Congo from the south-eastern part of the country to Lualaba.
