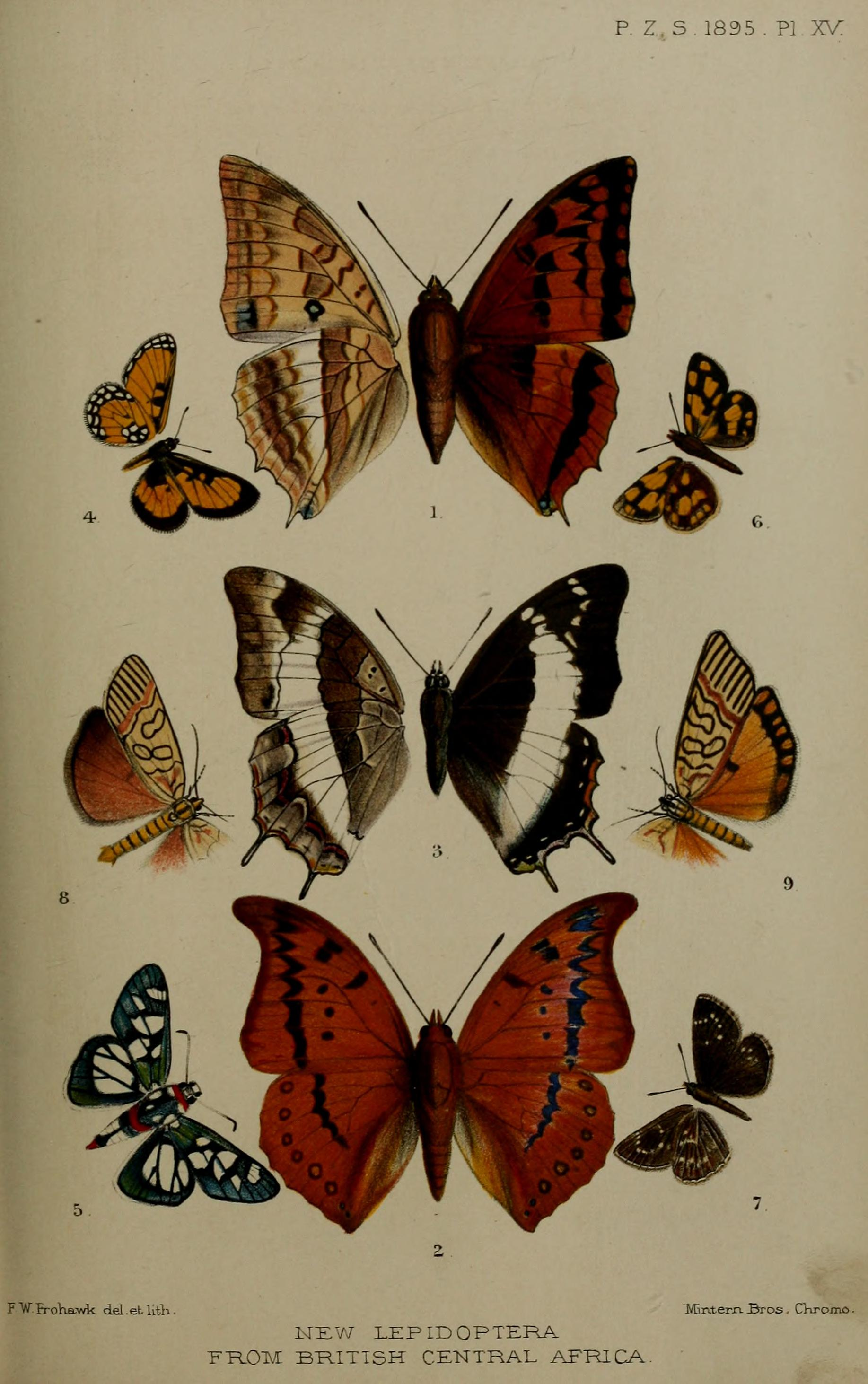
- Female C. b. whytei, figure 3

Scientific classification
- Kingdom: Animalia
- Phylum: Arthropoda
- Class: Insecta
- Order: Lepidoptera
- Family: Nymphalidae
- Genus: Charaxes
- Species: C. baumanni

Binomial name
- Charaxes baumanni Rogenhofer, 1891

Synonyms
- Charaxes selousi Trimen, 1894; Charaxes whytei Butler, 1894

= Charaxes baumanni =

Species of butterfly

Charaxes baumanni, the little charaxes, is a butterfly in the family Nymphalidae. It is found in Sudan, Kenya, the Democratic Republic of the Congo, Uganda, Rwanda, Tanzania, Zambia, Malawi, Mozambique and Zimbabwe. The habitat consists of open forests and woodland.

Both sexes visit fermenting fruit and also animal scats. Adults are on wing year round.

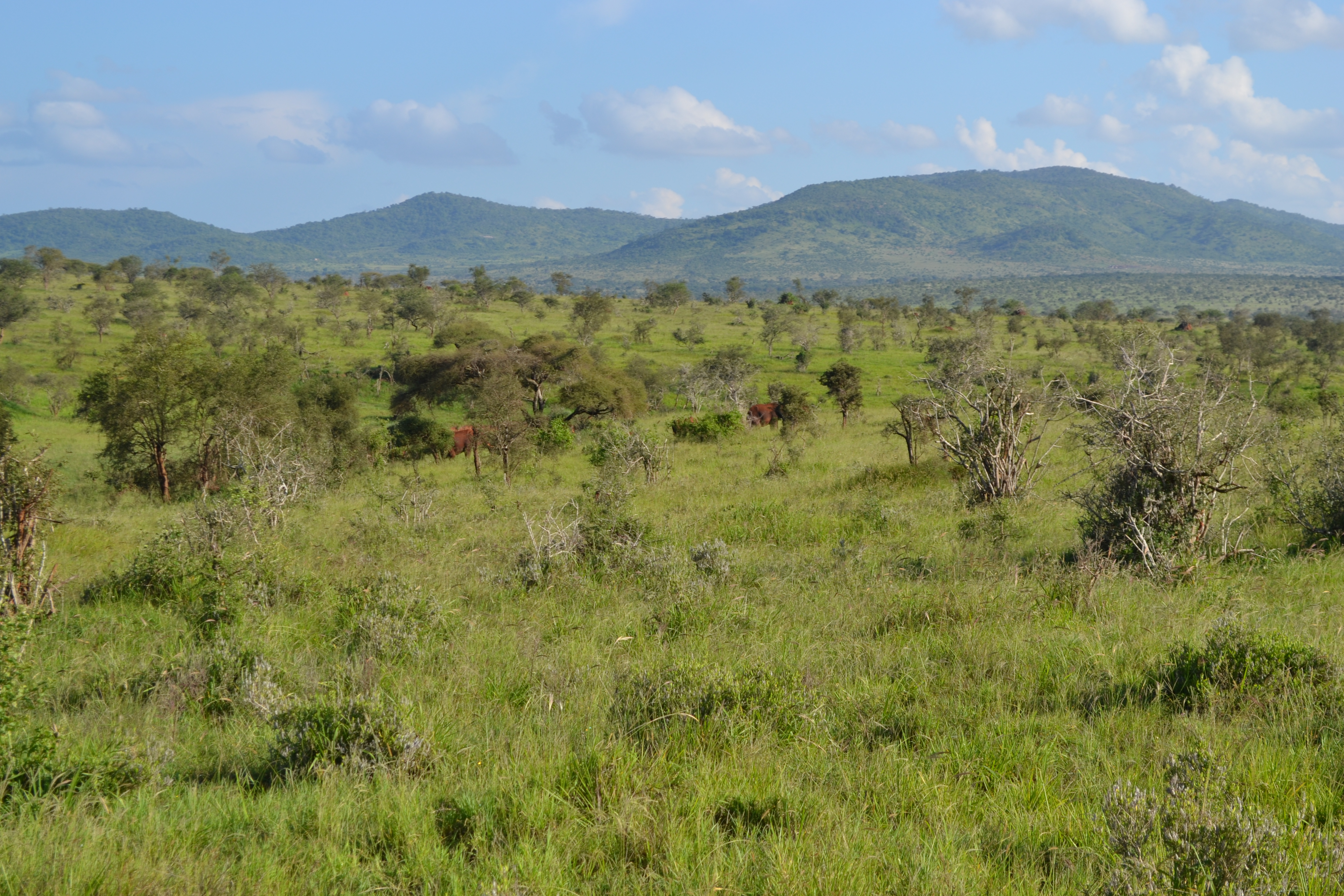
Woodland savanna habitat in Kenya

The larvae feed on Acacia brevispica, Acacia seyal, Acacia brevispica, Pterolobium stellatum and Caesalpinia decapetala.

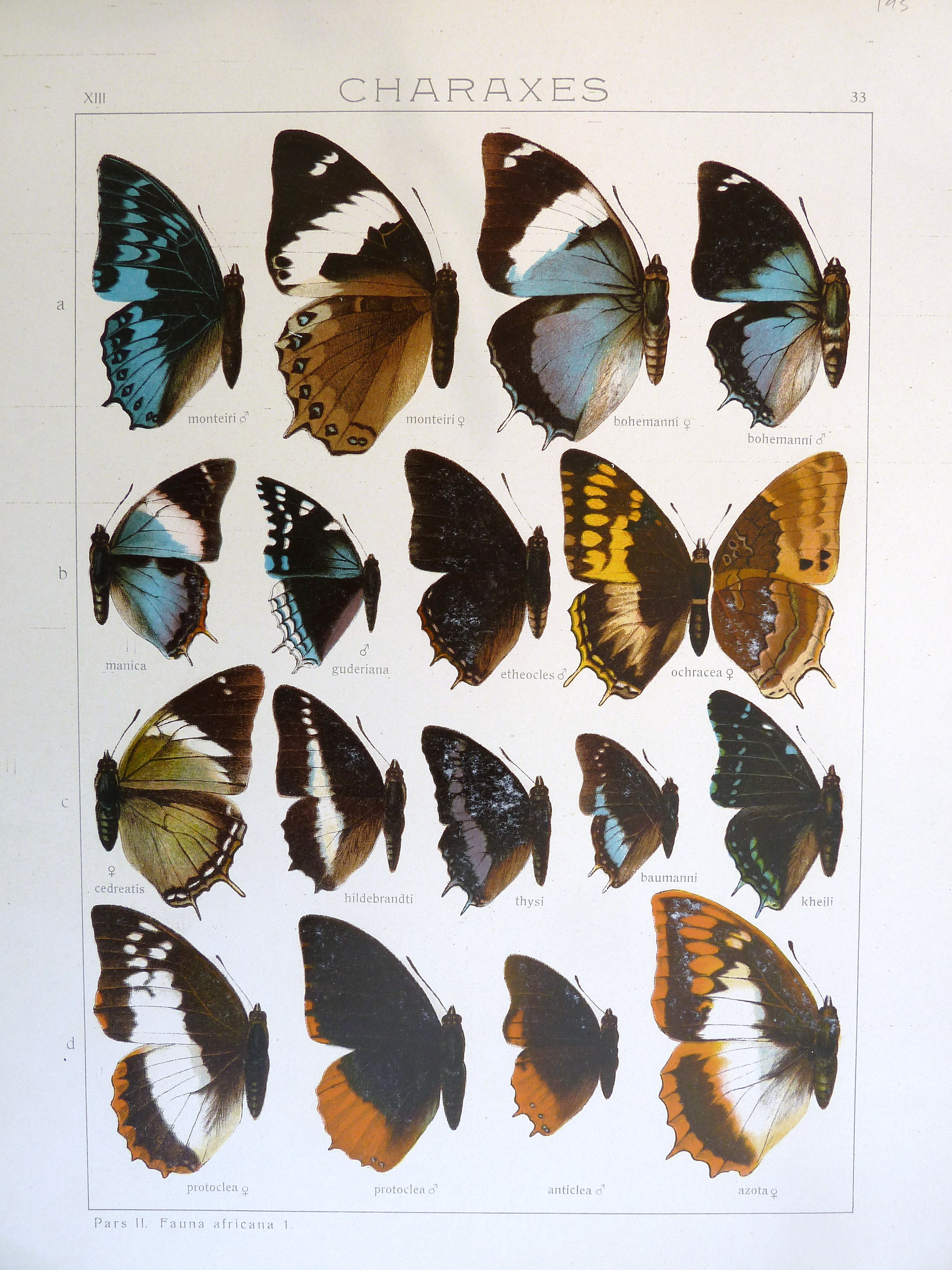
C. b. baumanni in Seitz

== Description ==
Ch. baumanni Rghfr. male: hindwing above beyond the middle between veins 2 and 7 with a light blue transverse band, in the middle about 5 mm. in breadth, anteriorly narrowed, which is also continued on the forewing but is there much narrower and broken up into small spots; forewing otherwise unmarked, but the hindwing with white-centred submarginal spots and greenish (in cellules 4—6 orange-yellow) marginal streaks. The fine black median line of the under surface is also continuous on the forewing to the costal margin, straight and on both wings distally bordered with whitish. In the female the transverse band on the upper surface is pure white, somewhat further from the distal margin and continuous to vein 4 of the forewing, then divided into two rows of spots. Manicaland, Nyassaland and German East Africa. A full description is given by Walter Rothschild and Karl Jordan, 1900 Novitates Zoologicae Volume 7:287-524. page 491-492 (for terms see Novitates Zoologicae Volume 5:545-601 )

== Subspecies ==
- C. b. baumanni (north-eastern Tanzania, south-eastern Kenya)
- C. b. bamptoni van Someren, 1974 . (Kenya: north to Mount Kulal)
- C. b. bwamba van Someren, 1971 (Uganda: Bwamba Valley, Democratic Republic of the Congo: Kivu)
- C. b. didingensis van Someren, 1971 (Sudan: south to the Didinga Mountains, northern Uganda, northern Kenya)
- C. b. granti Turlin, 1988, . (eastern Tanzania)
- C. b. interposita van Someren, 1971 (western Kenya, eastern and central Uganda, north-western Tanzania)
- C. b. nyiro Collins & Larsen, 1991 (Kenya: north to Mount Nyiro)
- C. b. selousi Trimen, 1894 (southern and eastern Zimbabwe, central Zambia)
- C. b. tenuis van Someren, 1971 (northern Tanzania, Kenya: highlands east of the Rift Valley)
- C. b. whytei Butler, 1894 (Democratic Republic of the Congo, southern and western Tanzania, northern and eastern Zambia, Malawi, Mozambique)

== Taxonomy ==
Charaxes baumanni is a member of the large species group Charaxes etheocles

== Realm ==
Afrotropical realm
