= Telipna citrimaculata =

Scientific classification
- Kingdom: Animalia
- Phylum: Arthropoda
- Class: Insecta
- Order: Lepidoptera
- Family: Lycaenidae
- Genus: Telipna
- Species: T. citrimaculata

Binomial name
- Telipna citrimaculata Schultze, 1916

Synonyms
- Telipna angustifascia Joicey & Talbot, 1921; Telipna neavei Bethune-Baker, 1926

Species of butterfly

Telipna citrimaculata is a butterfly in the family Lycaenidae. It is found in Cameroon, the Republic of the Congo, the Central African Republic, the Democratic Republic of the Congo and Uganda. The habitat consists of forests.

== Subspecies ==
- Telipna citrimaculata citrimaculata (Cameroon, northern Congo, Central African Republic, Democratic Republic of the Congo)
- Telipna citrimaculata neavei Bethune-Baker, 1926 (Democratic Republic of the Congo, western Uganda)
- Telipna citrimaculata victoriae Libert, 2005 (south-eastern Uganda)
