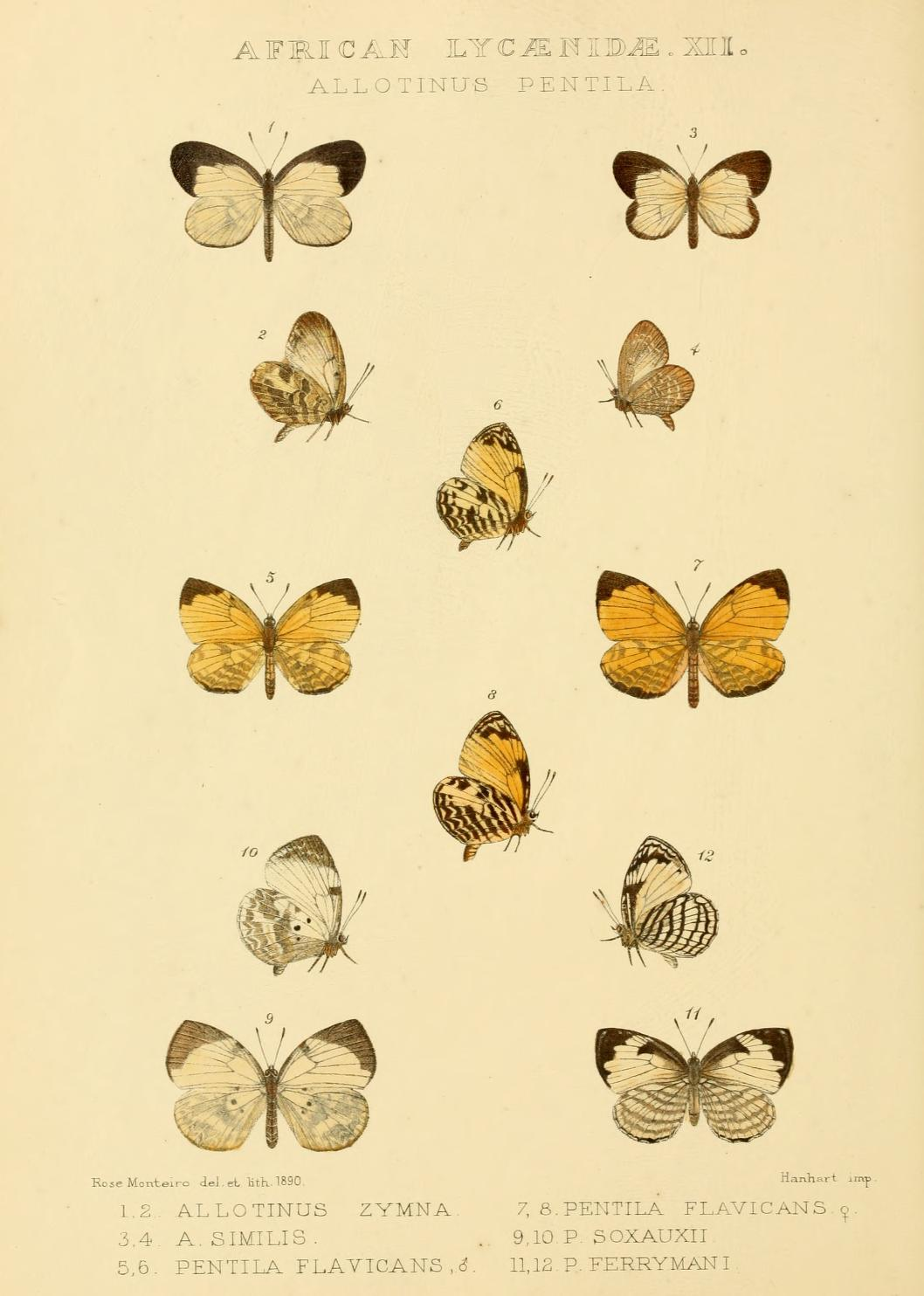

Scientific classification
- Kingdom: Animalia
- Phylum: Arthropoda
- Clade: Pancrustacea
- Class: Insecta
- Order: Lepidoptera
- Family: Lycaenidae
- Genus: Liptena
- Species: L. flavicans

Binomial name
- Liptena flavicans (Grose-Smith & Kirby, 1891)

Synonyms
- Pentila flavicans Grose-Smith & Kirby, 1891; Liptena flavicans var. praeusta Schultze, 1917

= Liptena flavicans =

Species of butterfly

Liptena flavicans, the large ochreous liptena, is a butterfly in the family Lycaenidae. It is found in Liberia, Ivory Coast, Ghana, Nigeria, Cameroon, Gabon, the Republic of the Congo, the Democratic Republic of the Congo, Uganda and Tanzania. The habitat consists of drier forests and open areas in wetter forests.

== Subspecies ==
- L. f. flavicans
- L. f. aequatorialis Stempffer, 1956 (Uganda: west to the Bwamba Valley, Democratic Republic of the Congo: Equateur, Tshuapa and Sankuru)
- L. f. katera Stempffer, 1956 (Uganda: western shores of Lake Victoria, north-western Tanzania)
- L. f. praeusta Schultze, 1917 (southern Cameroon, Gabon, Congo, Democratic Republic of the Congo: Uele)

Torben Larsen developed a species numbering system for his 2005 publication Butterflies of West Africa. Larsen described the West African subspecies as oniens with the reference #237. oniens is no longer valid. The 'Larsen' numbers have since been used with permission in A Sharp Eye on Butterflies of Ghana.
