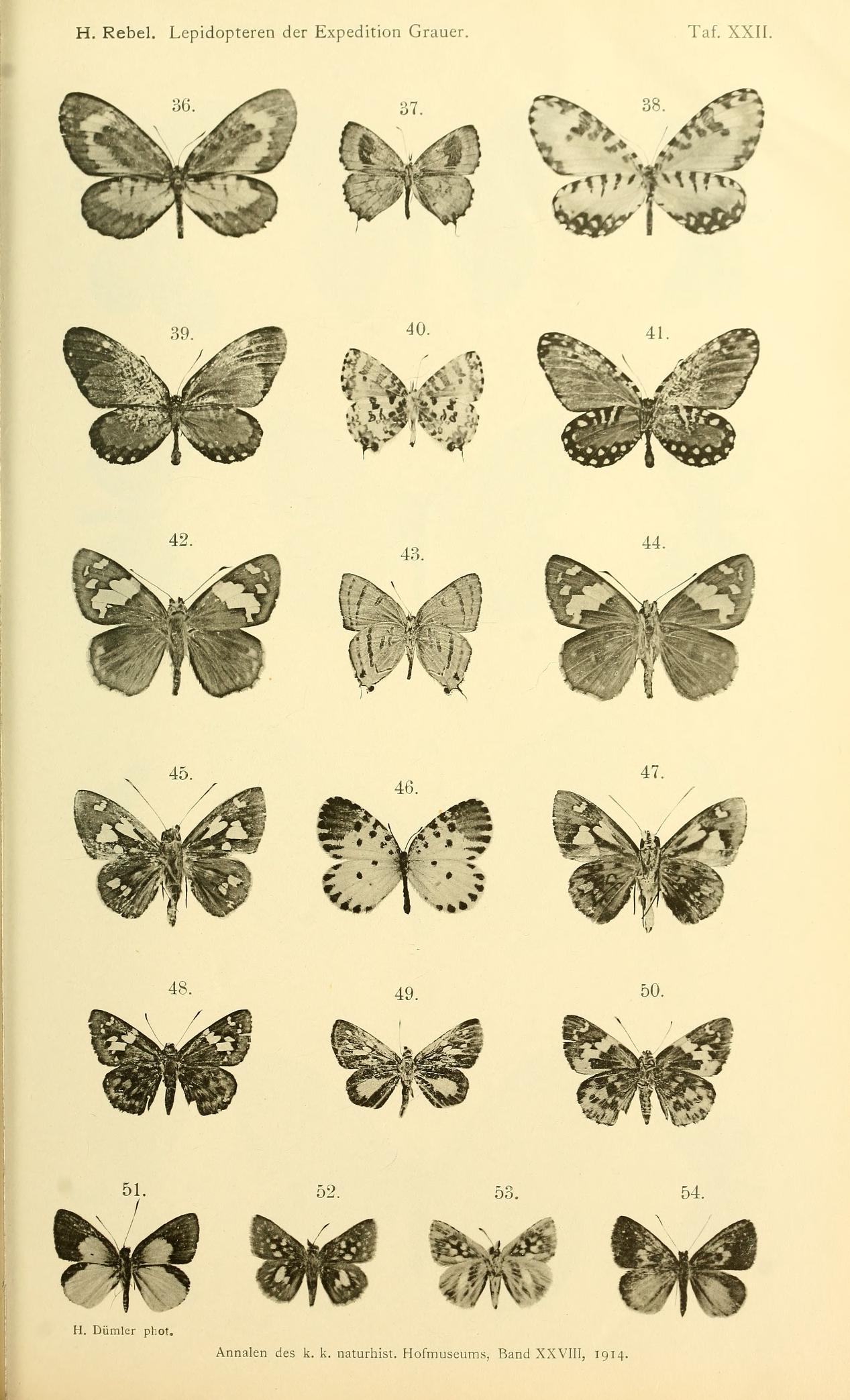
- Figure 45

Scientific classification
- Kingdom: Animalia
- Phylum: Arthropoda
- Clade: Pancrustacea
- Class: Insecta
- Order: Lepidoptera
- Family: Hesperiidae
- Genus: Lissia
- Species: L. luehderi

Binomial name
- Lissia luehderi (Plötz, 1879)

Synonyms
- List: Platingia luehderi Plötz, 1879; Caenides luehderi f. alenicola Strand, 1913; Caenides umbrina Rebel, 1914; Caenides luehderi; Leona luehderi (Plötz, 1879); Plastingia luehderi (Plötz, 1879)

= Lissia luehderi =

Species of butterfly

Lissia luehderi, or Luehder's recluse, is a species of butterfly in the family Hesperiidae. It is found in Sierra Leone, Ivory Coast, Ghana, Nigeria, Cameroon, the Democratic Republic of the Congo, Uganda, Kenya and Tanzania. The habitat consists of wetter forests.

== Subspecies ==
- Lissia luehderi luehderi (Sierra Leone, Ivory Coast, Ghana, Nigeria: Cross River loop, Cameroon, Democratic Republic of the Congo, western Uganda)
- Lissia luehderi laura Evans, 1937 (eastern Democratic Republic of the Congo, Uganda, western Kenya, north-western Tanzania)

Torben Larsen developed a species numbering system for his 2005 publication Butterflies of West Africa. The nominate subspecies is #1405. The 'Larsen' numbers have since been used with permission in A Sharp Eye on Butterflies of Ghana.
