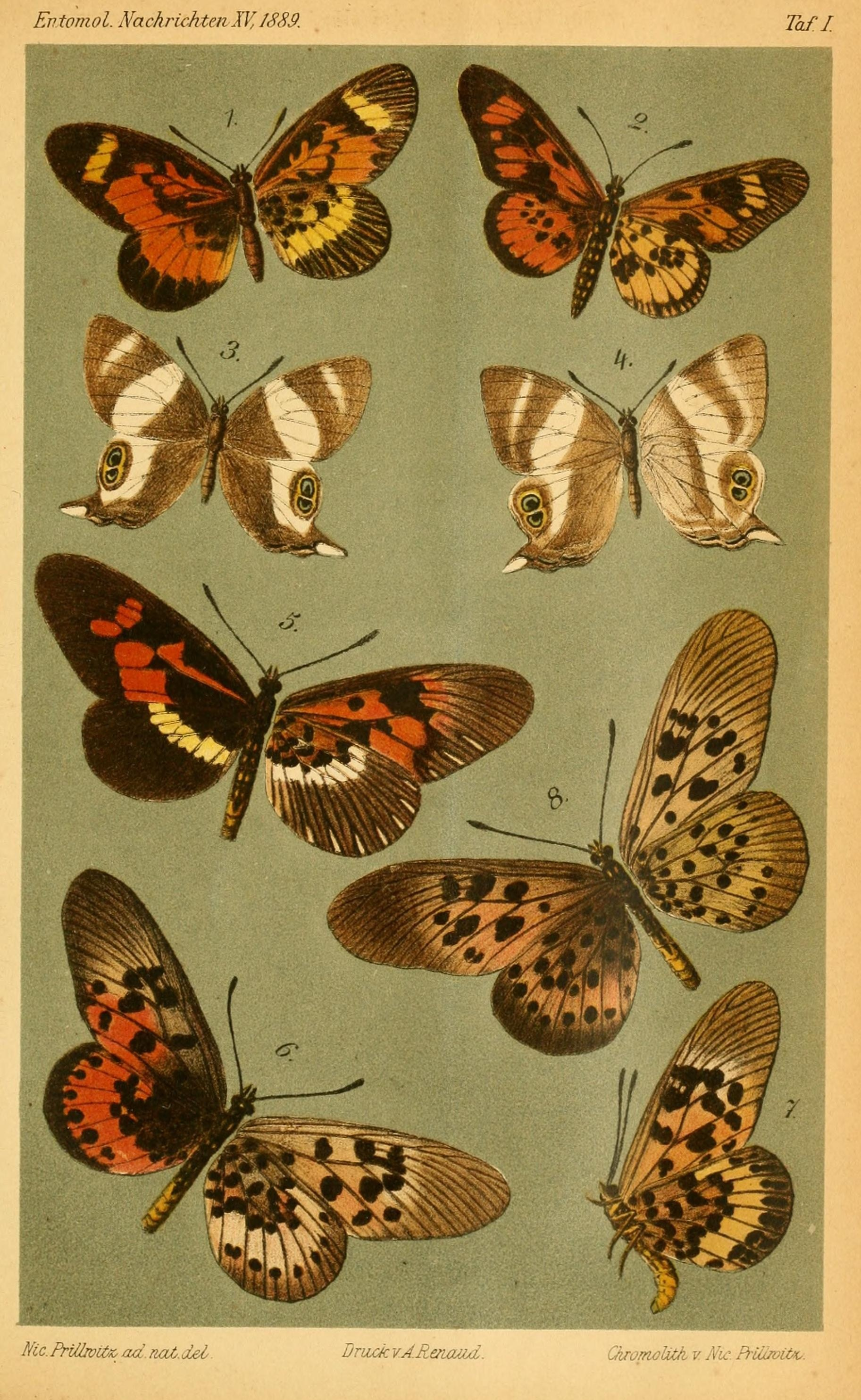
- 'Figure 1

Scientific classification
- Kingdom: Animalia
- Phylum: Arthropoda
- Clade: Pancrustacea
- Class: Insecta
- Order: Lepidoptera
- Family: Lycaenidae
- Genus: Mimacraea
- Species: M. krausei

Binomial name
- Mimacraea krausei Dewitz, 1889

Synonyms
- Mimacraea poultoni Neave, 1904; Mimacraea luteomaculata Grünberg, 1908; Mimacraea krausei elgonae Talbot, 1935; Mimacrea masindae Bethune-Baker, 1913; Mimacraea krausei f. viviana Talbot, 1935; Mimacraea krausei f. citrifascia Talbot, 1935

= Mimacraea krausei =

Species of butterfly

Mimacraea krausei, the Krause's acraea mimic, is a butterfly in the family Lycaenidae. It is found in Cameroon, the Republic of the Congo, the Democratic Republic of the Congo, Sudan, Uganda, Kenya and Tanzania. The habitat consists of forests.

The larvae feed on lichens and moss growing on tree trunks. They are dark sepia brown and reach a length of about 26 mm.

== Subspecies ==
- M. k. krausei (Congo, Uganda: Bwamba Valley, Democratic Republic of the Congo: Haut-Uele, Equateur, Kinshasa, Sankuru and Lualaba)
- M. k. camerunica Libert, 2000 (Cameroon)
- M. k. karschioides Carpenter & Jackson, 1950 (southern Sudan)
- M. k. poultoni Neave, 1904 (western Kenya, Uganda, north-western Tanzania)
