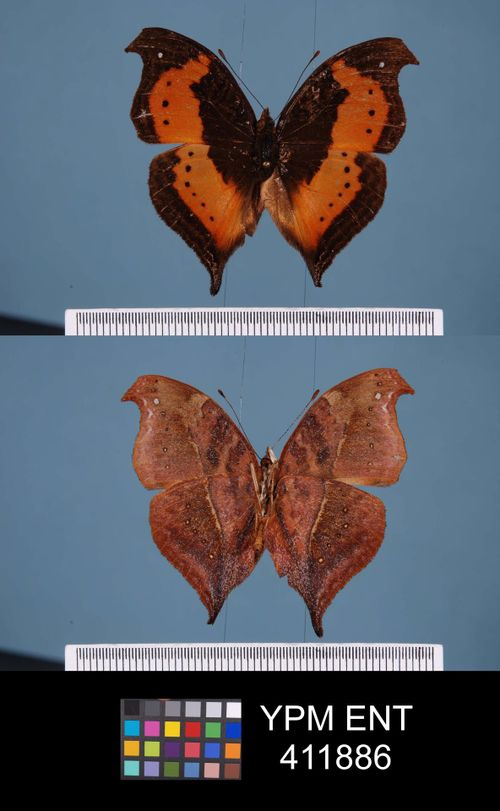

Scientific classification
- Kingdom: Animalia
- Phylum: Arthropoda
- Class: Insecta
- Order: Lepidoptera
- Family: Nymphalidae
- Genus: Precis
- Species: P. rauana

Binomial name
- Precis rauana (Grose-Smith, 1898)

Synonyms
- Junonia rauana Grose-Smith, 1898; Kallimula osborni Holland, 1920; Precis rauana kakamega Carcasson, 1961; Precis silvicola Schultze, 1916; Precis omissa Rothschild, 1918

= Precis rauana =

Montane commodore

Species of butterfly

Precis rauana, the montane commodore, is a butterfly in the family Nymphalidae. It is found in Nigeria, from Cameroon to the Democratic Republic of the Congo and in Uganda, Kenya, Tanzania and Zambia. The habitat consists of forests.

Both sexes are attracted to flowers.

The larvae feed on Plastostema and Plectranthus species.

== Subspecies ==
- Precis rauana rauana (Democratic Republic of the Congo, western Kenya, eastern Uganda, north-western Tanzania, Zambia)
- Precis rauana silvicola Schultz, 1916 (eastern Nigeria, Cameroon, Democratic Republic of the Congo, western Uganda)
