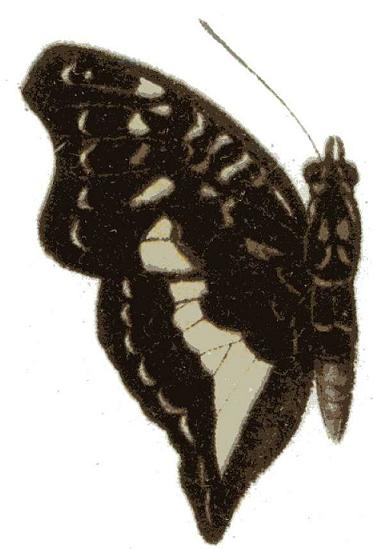

Scientific classification
- Domain: Eukaryota
- Kingdom: Animalia
- Phylum: Arthropoda
- Class: Insecta
- Order: Lepidoptera
- Family: Nymphalidae
- Genus: Euptera
- Species: E. hirundo

Binomial name
- Euptera hirundo Staudinger, 1891

Synonyms
- Euptera hirundo bakeri St Leger, 1969; Euptera hirundo lufirensis f. rufa Joicey and Talbot, 1921; Euptera hirundo rufa van Someren, 1939

= Euptera hirundo =

Species of butterfly

Euptera hirundo is a butterfly in the family Nymphalidae. It is found in Cameroon, Gabon, the Democratic Republic of the Congo, Uganda, Kenya, Zambia and Tanzania. The habitat consists of forests.

== Subspecies ==
- Euptera hirundo hirundo (Nigeria, Cameroon, Gabon, Uganda, Democratic Republic of the Congo: north to Ituri, Ulele and Equateur)
- Euptera hirundo lufirensis Joicey & Talbot, 1921 (eastern Democratic Republic of the Congo, Uganda, north-western Tanzania, Zambia)
