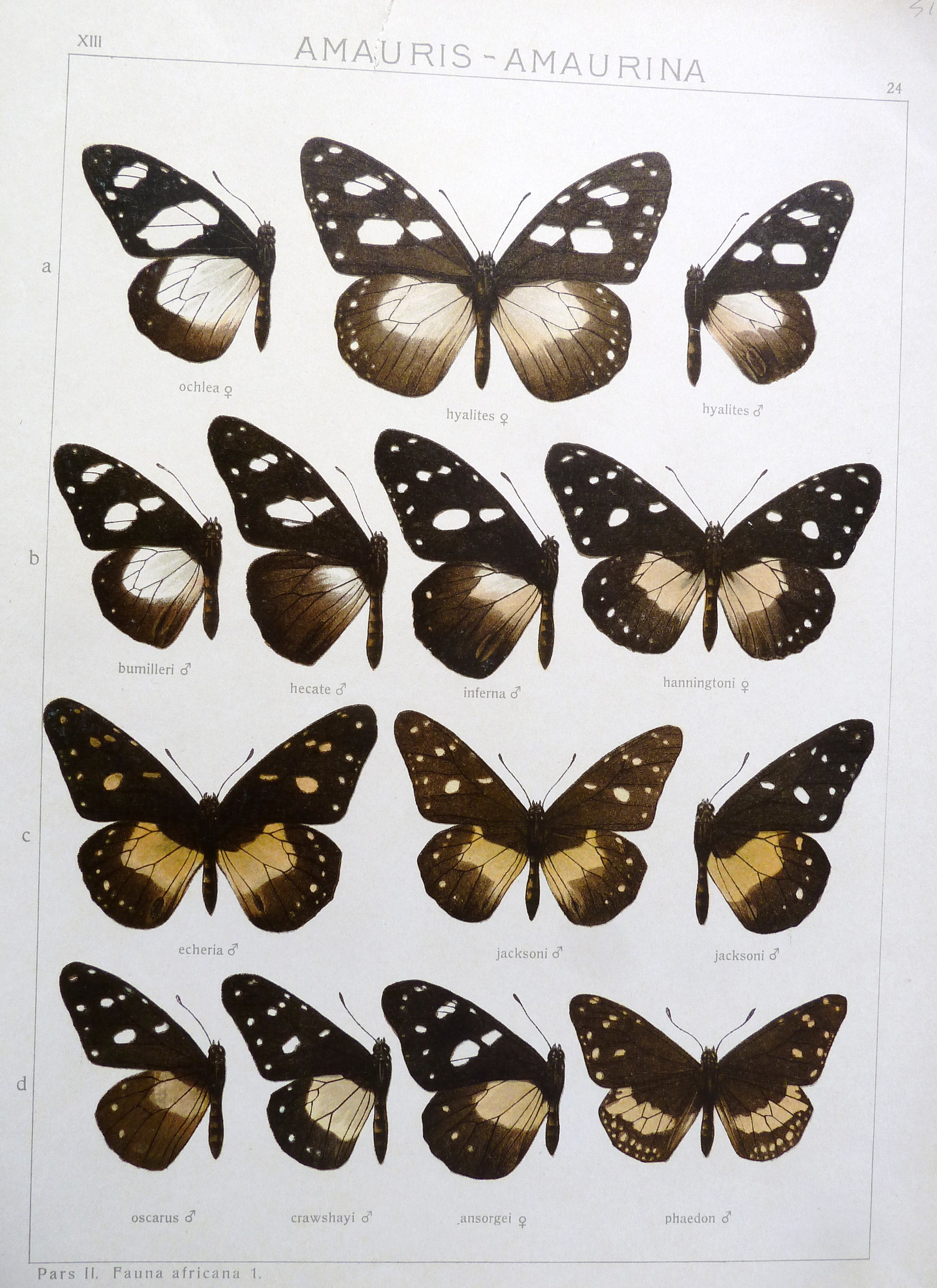
- In Adalbert Seitz's Fauna Africana

Scientific classification
- Domain: Eukaryota
- Kingdom: Animalia
- Phylum: Arthropoda
- Class: Insecta
- Order: Lepidoptera
- Family: Nymphalidae
- Genus: Amauris
- Species: A. inferna

Binomial name
- Amauris inferna Butler, 1871

Synonyms
- Amauris (Amaura) inferna; Amauris egialea r. semvitrea Mabille, 1876; Amauris hecatoides Aurivillius, 1901; Amauris hecate ab. reuteri Strand, 1910; Amauris inferna ab. infernalis Strand, 1912; Amauris grogani Sharpe, 1901; Amauris torleyi Hulstaert, 1926; Amauris egialea f. aurivilliana Bryk, 1937

= Amauris inferna =

Species of butterfly

Amauris inferna is a butterfly in the family Nymphalidae. It is found in Cameroon, Gabon, Equatorial Guinea, the Democratic Republic of the Congo, Uganda and Tanzania. The habitat consists of forests.

Adult males mud-puddle.

== Subspecies ==
- Amauris inferna inferna (Cameroon, Gabon, Democratic Republic of the Congo: Kinshasa)
- Amauris inferna discus Talbot, 1940 (Democratic Republic of the Congo: west and central to Kwilu, Sankuru, Kisangami)
- Amauris inferna grogani Sharpe, 1901 (western Uganda, Democratic Republic of the Congo: east to northern Kivu and Ituri)
- Amauris inferna moka Talbot, 1940 (Bioko)
- Amauris inferna uganda Talbot, 1940 (Uganda, Tanzania: north-west and Kere Hill)
