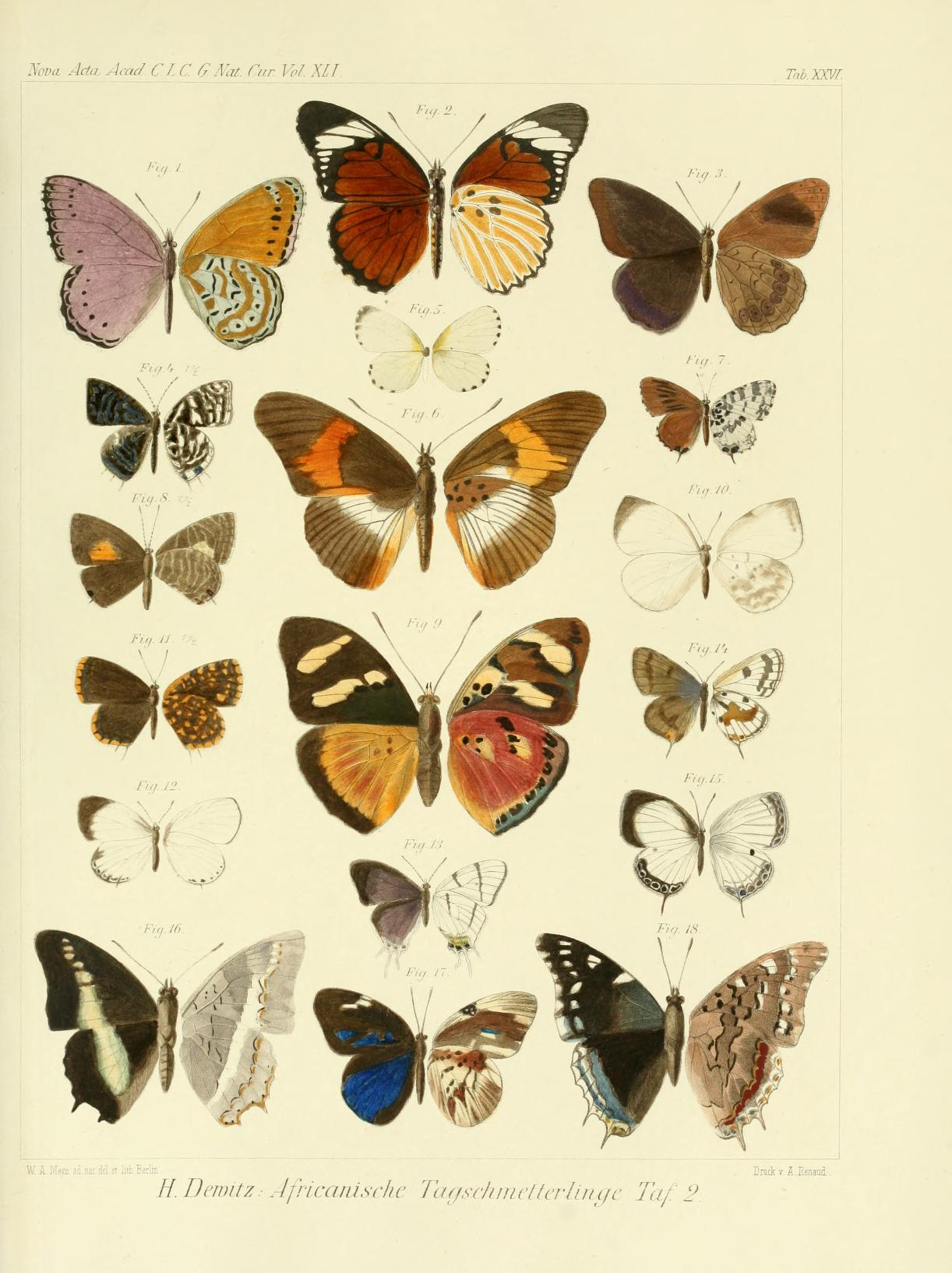

Scientific classification
- Kingdom: Animalia
- Phylum: Arthropoda
- Clade: Pancrustacea
- Class: Insecta
- Order: Lepidoptera
- Family: Nymphalidae
- Genus: Charaxes
- Species: C. hildebrandti

Binomial name
- Charaxes hildebrandti (Dewitz, 1879).

Synonyms
- Nymphalis hildebrandti Dewitz, 1879; Charaxes hildebrandtii; Charaxes galba Distant, 1879; Charaxes talagugae Holland, 1886; Charaxes hidebrandti hildebrandti f. michelae Plantrou, 1980

= Charaxes hildebrandti =

Species of butterfly

Charaxes hildebrandti, the Hildebrandt's charaxes, is a butterfly in the family Nymphalidae. It is found in Sierra Leone, Ivory Coast, Ghana, Nigeria, Cameroon, Gabon, the Republic of the Congo, Angola, the Central African Republic, the Democratic Republic of the Congo, Uganda and Zambia. It is a rare and local species

== Description ==
Ch. hildebrandti Dew. male : wings above black with a common, straight, white, bluish-bordered transverse band, extending from vein 2 on the hindwing to vein 7 or 8 on the forewing, but in cellules 5—8 of the forewing broken up into small, rounded spots; tails of the hindwing short and obtuse. The white transverse band occurs beneath also and is here basally bounded on the hindwing by the fine, continuous and nearly straight black discal line, but on the forewing in cellules lb—3 proximally often angled at the veins so as to form a series of steps. Hindwing beneath with yellowish marginal line. The female is somewhat larger than the male and has the white transverse band broader and scarcely margined with blue, reaching the inner margin of the hindwing; otherwise it agrees with the male. Gold Coast to Angola.

== Biology ==
Its habitat consists of lowland evergreen forests.

The larvae feed on Dyboscia species.

== Subspecies ==
- Charaxes hildebrandti hildebrandti (Nigeria, Cameroon, Gabon, Congo, northern Angola, Central African Republic, northern and central Democratic Republic of the Congo, western Uganda)
- Charaxes hildebrandti gillesi Plantrou, 1973 (Sierra Leone, Ivory Coast, Ghana, western Nigeria)
- Charaxes hildebrandti katangensis Talbot, 1928(eastern and southern Democratic Republic of the Congo, north-western Zambia, Uganda: west to the Bwamba Valley)

== Taxonomy ==
Charaxes hildebrandti is a member of the large species group Charaxes etheocles.

== Realm ==
Afrotropical realm

== Etymology ==
The name honours Johann Maria Hildebrandt.
