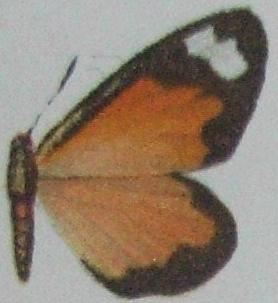

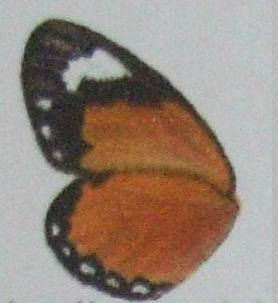

Scientific classification
- Domain: Eukaryota
- Kingdom: Animalia
- Phylum: Arthropoda
- Class: Insecta
- Order: Lepidoptera
- Family: Lycaenidae
- Genus: Liptenara
- Species: L. hiendlmayri

Binomial name
- Liptenara hiendlmayri (Dewitz, 1887)

Synonyms
- Pentila hiendlmayri Dewitz, 1887

= Liptenara hiendlmayri =

Species of butterfly

Liptenara hiendlmayri is a butterfly in the family Lycaenidae. It is found in the Republic of Congo, the Democratic Republic of Congo (Lulua and Sankuru) and Uganda (from the western part of the country to the Bwamba and Budongo forests).
