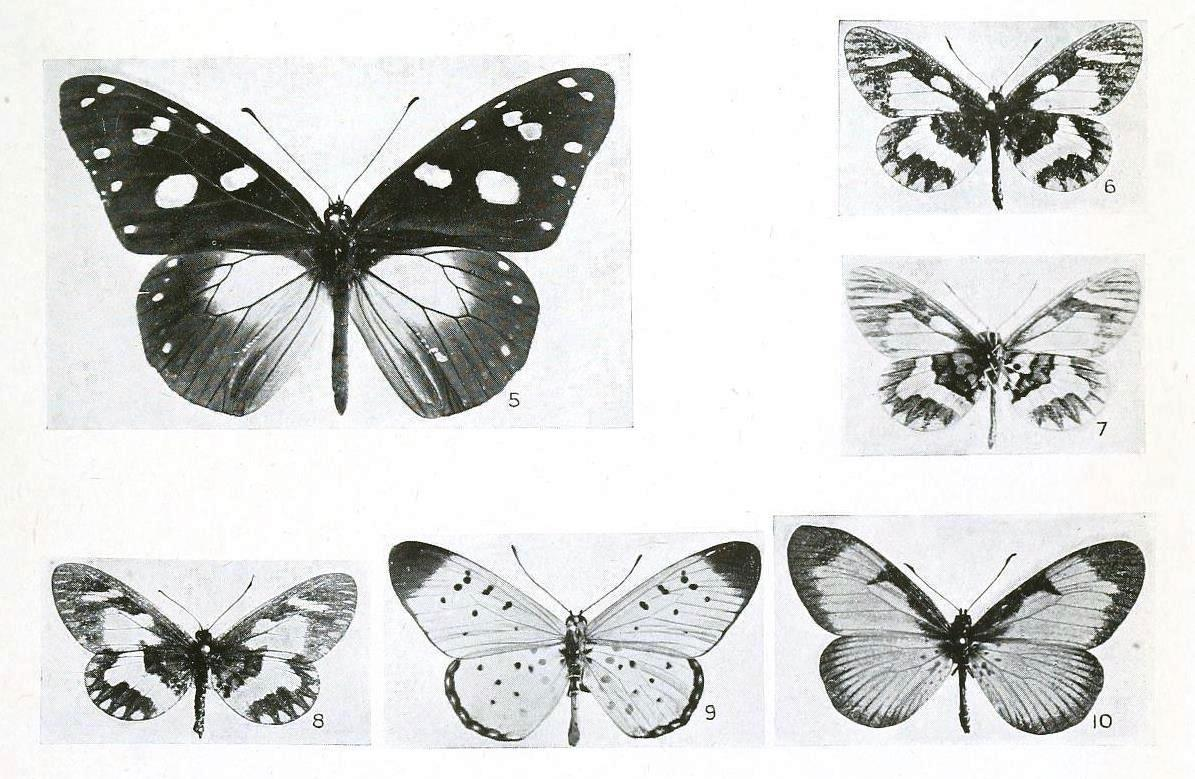
- Figure 10

Scientific classification
- Kingdom: Animalia
- Phylum: Arthropoda
- Class: Insecta
- Order: Lepidoptera
- Family: Nymphalidae
- Genus: Acraea
- Species: A. alciopoides

Binomial name
- Acraea alciopoides Joicey & Talbot, 1921

Synonyms
- Acraea disjuncta f. alciopoides Joicey & Talbot, 1921; Acraea (Actinote) alciopoides

= Acraea alciopoides =

Insect species

Acraea alciopoides is a butterfly in the family Nymphalidae. It is found in the Democratic Republic of the Congo (from the eastern part of the country to Ituri), western Uganda and north-western Tanzania. The habitat consists of forests.

== Taxonomy ==
It is a member of the Acraea jodutta species group- but see also Pierre & Bernaud, 2014
