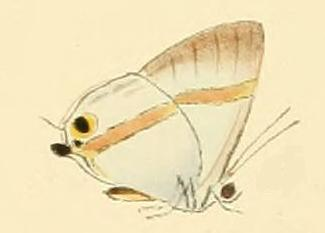

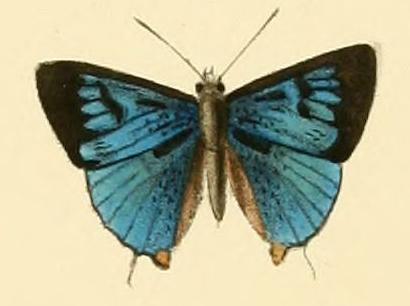

Scientific classification
- Domain: Eukaryota
- Kingdom: Animalia
- Phylum: Arthropoda
- Class: Insecta
- Order: Lepidoptera
- Family: Lycaenidae
- Genus: Pilodeudorix
- Species: P. mera

Binomial name
- Pilodeudorix mera (Hewitson, 1873)

Synonyms
- Hypolycaena mera Hewitson, 1873; Deudorix (Hypokopelates) mera f. kinumbensis Dufrane, 1945

= Pilodeudorix mera =

Species of butterfly

Pilodeudorix mera, the streaked fairy playboy, is a butterfly in the family Lycaenidae. It is found in Ivory Coast, Nigeria, Cameroon, Gabon, the Republic of the Congo, Angola, the Democratic Republic of the Congo, Uganda, Rwanda, Tanzania and Zambia. The habitat consists of primary forests.

== Images ==
External images from Royal Museum of Central Africa.

== Subspecies ==
- Pilodeudorix mera mera (Ivory Coast, Nigeria: east and the Cross River loop, Cameroon, Gabon, Congo, northern Angola, western Uganda, north-western Zambia, Democratic Republic of the Congo: Uele, Tshopo, Equateur, Kinshasa, Sankuru and Lualaba)
- Pilodeudorix mera kinumbensis (Dufrane, 1945) (eastern Democratic Republic of the Congo, Uganda, Rwanda, north-western Tanzania)
