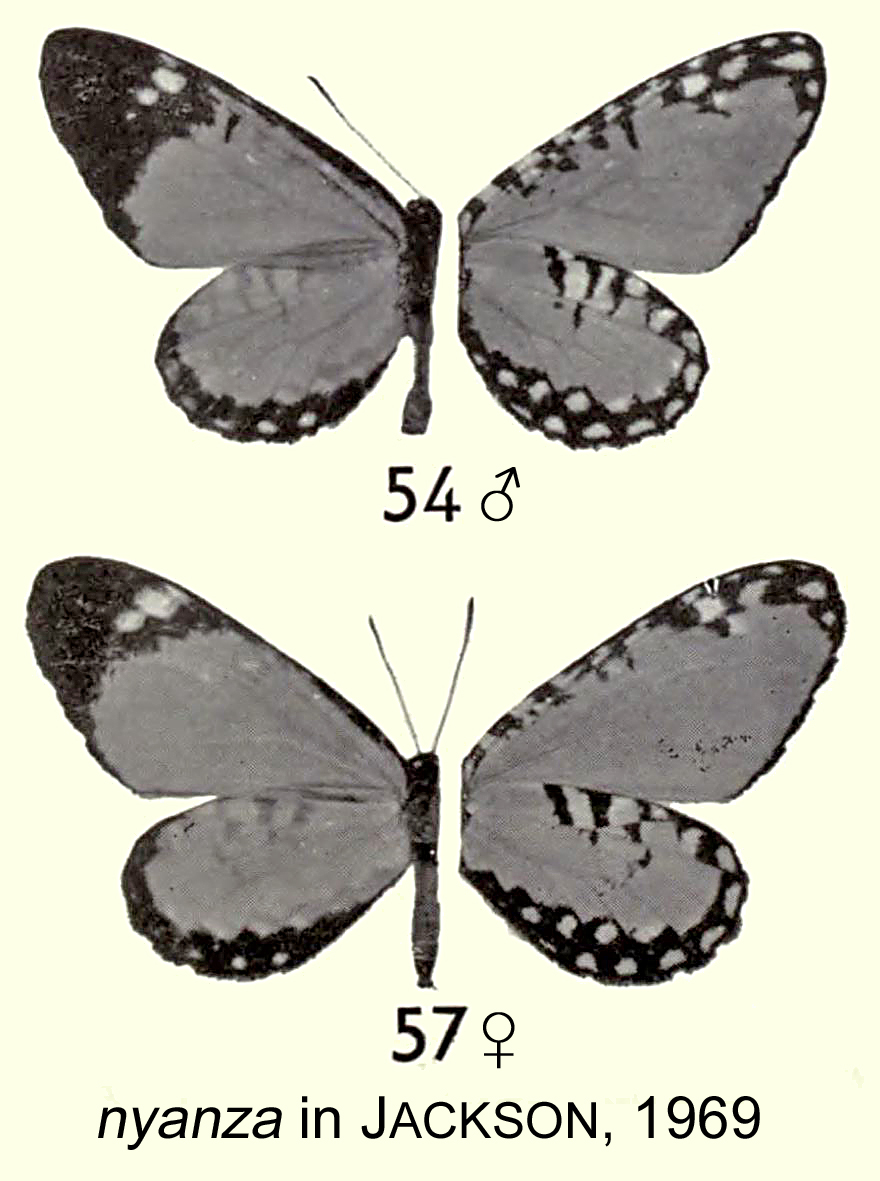

Scientific classification
- Kingdom: Animalia
- Phylum: Arthropoda
- Class: Insecta
- Order: Lepidoptera
- Family: Lycaenidae
- Genus: Telipna
- Species: T. nyanza

Binomial name
- Telipna nyanza Neave, 1904

Synonyms
- Telipna ruspinoides katangae Stempffer, 1961

= Telipna nyanza =

Species of butterfly

Telipna nyanza is a butterfly in the family Lycaenidae. It is found in Cameroon, the Republic of the Congo, the Central African Republic, the Democratic Republic of the Congo, Uganda, Zambia and Angola. The habitat consists of forests.

== Subspecies ==
- Telipna nyanza nyanza (Uganda)
- Telipna nyanza katangae Stempffer, 1961 (eastern Cameroon, Congo, Central African Republic, Democratic Republic of the Congo, Uganda, Zambia, Angola)
