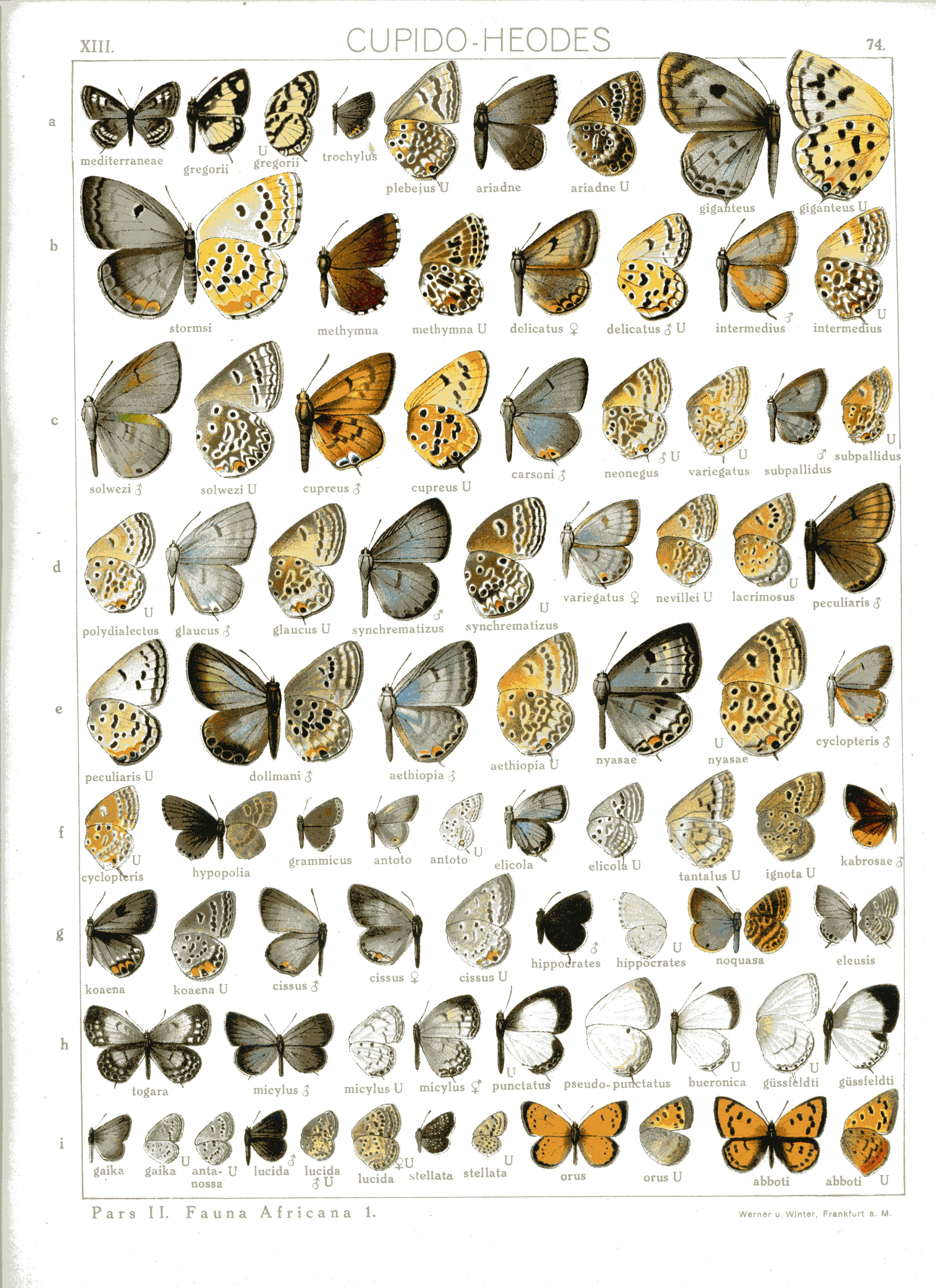
- as micyclus

Scientific classification
- Domain: Eukaryota
- Kingdom: Animalia
- Phylum: Arthropoda
- Class: Insecta
- Order: Lepidoptera
- Family: Lycaenidae
- Genus: Thermoniphas
- Species: T. togara

Binomial name
- Thermoniphas togara (Plötz, 1880)

Synonyms
- Lycaena togara Plötz, 1880

= Thermoniphas togara =

Species of butterfly

Thermoniphas togara, the bright chalk blue, is a butterfly in the family Lycaenidae. It is found in Nigeria, Cameroon, Gabon, the Republic of the Congo, the Central African Republic, the Democratic Republic of the Congo and Uganda. The habitat consists of forest edges.

== Subspecies ==
- Thermoniphas togara togara (eastern Nigeria, Cameroon, Gabon, Congo, Central African Republic, Uganda, Democratic Republic of the Congo: Mayumbe, Mongala, Uele, Ituri, Tshopo, Tshuapa, Equateur and Lualaba)
- Thermoniphas togara bugalla Stempffer & Jackson, 1962 (Uganda: Sesse Islands in Lake Victoria)
