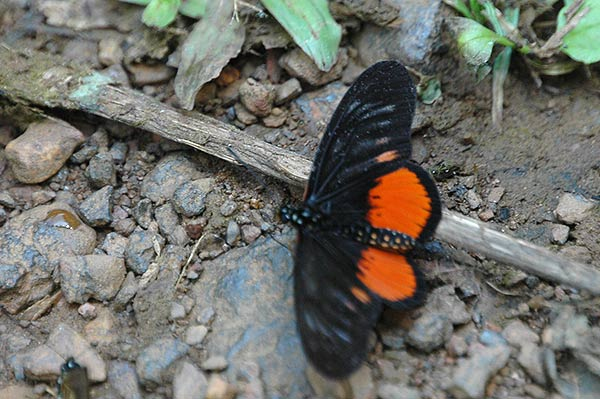

Scientific classification
- Kingdom: Animalia
- Phylum: Arthropoda
- Class: Insecta
- Order: Lepidoptera
- Family: Nymphalidae
- Genus: Acraea
- Species: A. grosvenori

Binomial name
- Acraea grosvenori Eltringham, 1912

= Acraea grosvenori =

Species of butterfly

Acraea grosvenori is a butterfly of the family Nymphalidae. It is found in the eastern Democratic Republic of the Congo and western Uganda.

== Description ==
A. grosvenori Eltr. (60 b) approximates to the preceding species [ parrhasia ] in size and shape. Forewing above entirely blackish and only in the cell and in place of the spots slightly transparent; hindwing above at the base to veins 2 and 7 black, then brick-red with very narrow dark marginal line and very fine streaks on the interneural folds, beneath uniform orange-yellow with a few small black dots at the base and long streaks at the distal margin on the folds, but the veins scarcely edged with black. Eastern Congo region.

== Taxonomy ==
It is a member of the Acraea circeis species group - but see also Pierre & Bernaud, 2014
