= Bematistes obliqua =

Scientific classification
- Kingdom: Animalia
- Phylum: Arthropoda
- Clade: Pancrustacea
- Class: Insecta
- Order: Lepidoptera
- Family: Nymphalidae
- Genus: Bematistes
- Species: B. obliqua

Binomial name
- Bematistes obliqua (Aurivillius, 1913)

Synonyms
- Planema obliqua Aurivillius, 1913; Acraea obliqua (Aurivillius, 1913); Acraea (Acraea) obliqua; Planema elgonense Poulton, 1927; Bematistes elgonense; Bematistes elgonense f. ela Rumbucher, 1992; Planema obliqua kivuensis Joicey & Talbot, 1927; Planema elgonense toroense Poulton, 1929

Species of butterfly

Bematistes obliqua, the yellow-banded bematistes, is a species of butterfly in the family Nymphalidae. It is found in Nigeria, Cameroon, the Democratic Republic of the Congo and Uganda.

== Description ==
P. obliqua spec. nov. male- wings blackish above; forewing with a light orange-yellow transverse band, which begins somewhat beyond the middle of the costal margin, is about 7 mm. in breadth throughout and at the hinder angle reaches the hindmargin; in cellules 4-6 it is proximally rounded and touches the extreme posterior point of the cell, then in cellules 3 and 2 oblique basewards and almost straight and hence reaches vein 2 beyond its middle, so that more than the basal half of cellule 2 is black and cellule 3 has a large triangular black spot at the base; the orange-yellow spot in cellule 2 reaches the distal margin and is about 8 mm. in length, in la and lb the band projects more towards the base than in 2; the hindwing has on both surfaces a white median band, at the costal margin about 4 mm. in breadth, at the inner margin 6 mm., its proximal edge sharp and rectilinear, the distal less sharp; basal area black above, bright red-brown beneath. female unknown to me. The species is nearly allied to poggei, formosa and macarista, but if the shape of the transverse band in these species is constant, as is generally accepted, the male described above must be an independent species, which may be known at once by the position and shape of the transverse band of the forewing in cellules 2 and 3. Fongo Tunga.

== Subspecies ==
- Bematistes obliqua obliqua (Nigeria, Cameroon)
- Bematistes obliqua elgonense (Poulton, 1927) (Uganda: western slopes of Mount Elgon)
- Bematistes obliqua kivuensis (Joicey & Talbot, 1927) (Uganda: west to the highlands, Democratic Republic of the Congo: east to Kivu and Ituri)

== Biology ==
The habitat consists of sub-montane forest.

This species is mimicked by a form of Pseudacraea eurytus.

The larvae feed on Adenia cisampelloides.

== Taxonomy ==
See Pierre & Bernaud, 2014
