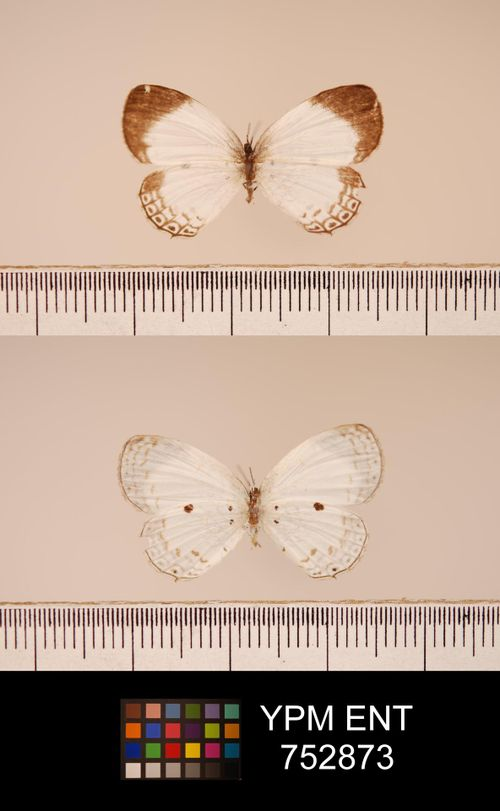

Scientific classification
- Kingdom: Animalia
- Phylum: Arthropoda
- Class: Insecta
- Order: Lepidoptera
- Family: Lycaenidae
- Genus: Thermoniphas
- Species: T. plurilimbata

Binomial name
- Thermoniphas plurilimbata Karsch, 1895

Synonyms
- Oberonia trypherota Bethune-Baker, 1909; Oboronia rutshurensis Joicey & Talbot, 1921

= Thermoniphas plurilimbata =

Species of butterfly

Thermoniphas plurilimbata is a butterfly in the family Lycaenidae which is native to Africa.

It is found in the Republic of the Congo, the Democratic Republic of the Congo, Rwanda, Burundi, Uganda and Tanzania. The habitat consists of swampy areas in forests.

== Subspecies ==
- Thermoniphas plurilimbata plurilimbata (Congo, Uganda, north-western Tanzania, Democratic Republic of the Congo: Mongala, Uele, Ituri, Tshopo, Equateur, Kasai, Kwango, Sankuru and Lualaba)
- Thermoniphas plurilimbata rutshurensis (Joicey & Talbot, 1921) (Democratic Republic of the Congo: east to North Kivu, Uganda: south-west to the Kigezi district, Rwanda, Burundi)
