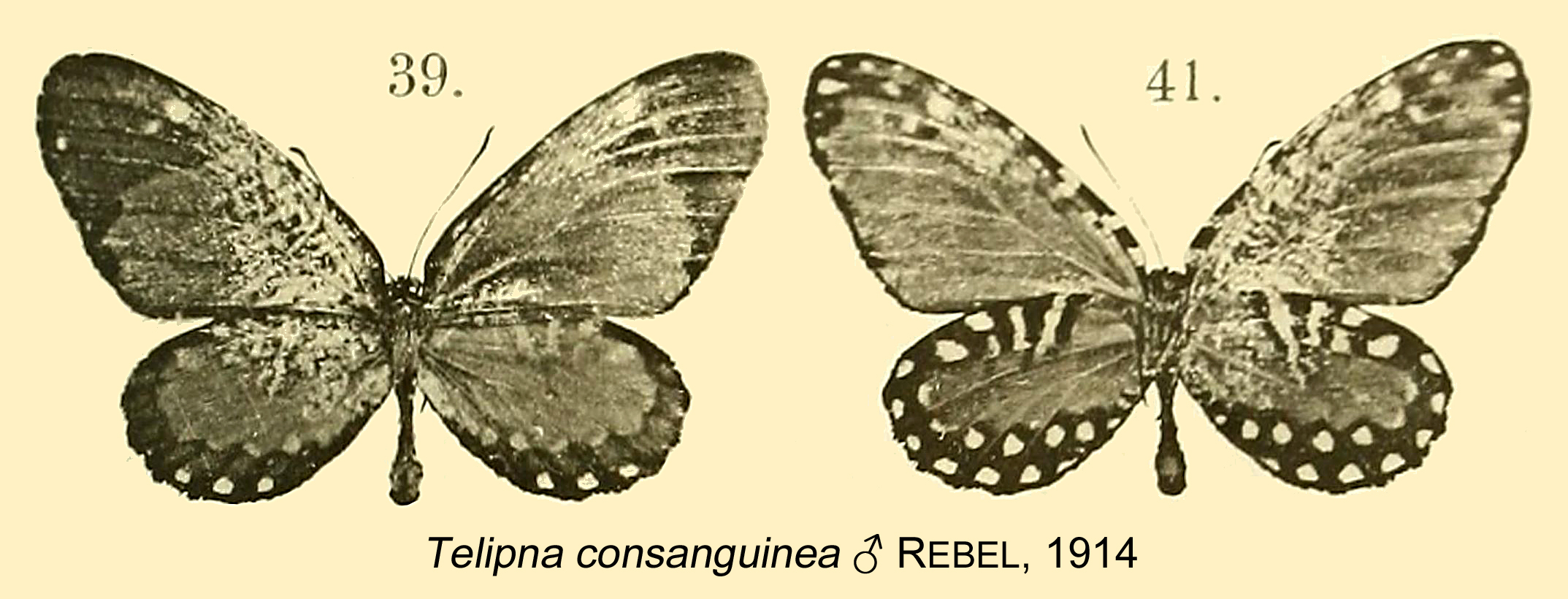

Scientific classification
- Kingdom: Animalia
- Phylum: Arthropoda
- Class: Insecta
- Order: Lepidoptera
- Family: Lycaenidae
- Genus: Telipna
- Species: T. consanguinea

Binomial name
- Telipna consanguinea Rebel, 1914

Synonyms
- Telipna consanguinea ab. exstincta Schultze, 1923; Telipna erica f. ugandae Bethune-Baker, 1926

= Telipna consanguinea =

Species of butterfly

Telipna consanguinea is a butterfly in the family Lycaenidae. It is found in Cameroon, the Central African Republic, the Democratic Republic of the Congo, Uganda and Tanzania. The habitat consists of forests.

The larvae feed on lichens and mosses growing on the bark of trees.

== Subspecies ==
- Telipna consanguinea consanguinea (Cameroon, Central African Republic, Democratic Republic of the Congo, Uganda)
- Telipna consanguinea ugandae Behune-Baker, 1926 (Uganda, Tanzania)
