= Falcuna orientalis =

Scientific classification
- Kingdom: Animalia
- Phylum: Arthropoda
- Class: Insecta
- Order: Lepidoptera
- Family: Lycaenidae
- Genus: Falcuna
- Species: F. orientalis

Binomial name
- Falcuna orientalis (Bethune-Baker, 1906)

Synonyms
- Liptena libyssa orientalis Bethune-Baker, 1906; Liptena libyssa var. confluens Grünberg, 1908

Species of butterfly

Falcuna orientalis, the oriental marble, is a butterfly in the family Lycaenidae. It is found in the Democratic Republic of the Congo, Uganda, Kenya and Tanzania. The habitat consists of primary forests.

== Subspecies ==
- Falcuna orientalis orientalis (Uganda, western Kenya, north-western Tanzania)
- Falcuna orientalis bwamba Stempffer & Bennett, 1963 (Uganda: Bwamba Valley, Democratic Republic of the Congo: east to Ituri, Kivu and Maniema)
