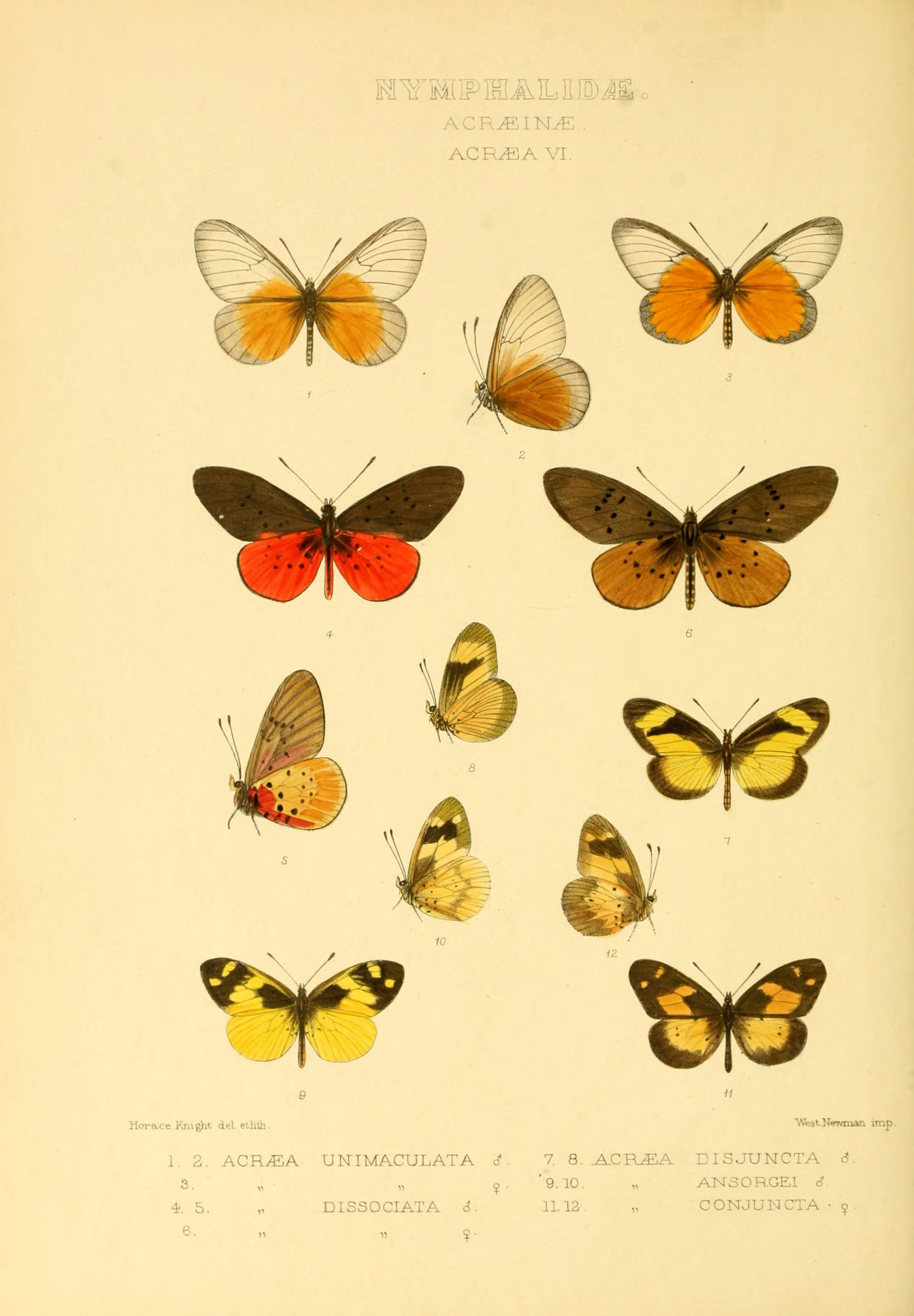
- Figures 7 and 8

Scientific classification
- Kingdom: Animalia
- Phylum: Arthropoda
- Class: Insecta
- Order: Lepidoptera
- Family: Nymphalidae
- Genus: Acraea
- Species: A. disjuncta

Binomial name
- Acraea disjuncta Grose-Smith, 1898

Synonyms
- Acraea (Actinote) disjuncta; Acraea nandensis (Sharpe, 1899)

= Acraea disjuncta =

Species of butterfly

Acraea disjuncta is a butterfly in the family Nymphalidae. It is found in the Democratic Republic of the Congo, Kenya and Uganda.

== Description ==
A. disjuncta Sm. (= nandensis E. Sharpe) (60 c) resembles a small male jodutta; both wings blackish above with light yellow markings; the hindmarginal spot of the forewing is broad, without, however, reaching the base of cellules 1 a and 1 b; the subapical band is about 4 mm. in breadth and has a small spot in 3, which touches the hindmarginal spot; the median band on the upperside of the hindwing is about 8 mm. in breadth and the dark, sharply defined marginal band consequently at most 3 mm. Nandi, Ruwenzori; Lake Kiwi.

== Subspecies ==
- Acraea disjuncta disjuncta (western Kenya, Uganda)
- Acraea disjuncta kigeziensis Jackson, 1956 (Uganda: west to Toro and Kigezi, Democratic Republic of the Congo: Kivu and Ituri)

== Biology ==
The larvae feed on Urera hypselodendron.

== Taxonomy ==
It is a member of the Acraea jodutta species group - but see also Pierre & Bernaud, 2014
