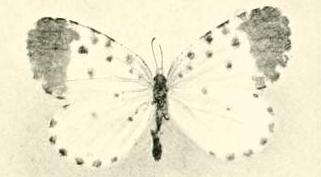

Scientific classification
- Domain: Eukaryota
- Kingdom: Animalia
- Phylum: Arthropoda
- Class: Insecta
- Order: Lepidoptera
- Family: Lycaenidae
- Genus: Pentila
- Species: P. cloetensi

Binomial name
- Pentila cloetensi Aurivillius, 1898

Synonyms
- Pentila elfrieda Suffert, 1904; Pentila aspasia albida Hawker-Smith, 1933; Pentila cloetensi ab. elfriedana Strand, 1918; Pentila aspasia Grünberg, 1910; Pentila catauga Rebel, 1914; Pentila auga congoensis Joicey and Talbot, 1921; Pentila cloetensi ueleensis Stempffer and Bennett, 1961; Pentila cloetensi ab. latefascia Dufrane, 1953; Pentila lucayensis Schultze, 1923

= Pentila cloetensi =

Species of butterfly

Pentila cloetensi is a butterfly in the family Lycaenidae. It is found in Cameroon, Gabon, the Republic of the Congo, Equatorial Guinea, the Democratic Republic of the Congo, Uganda and Tanzania. The habitat consists of forests.

Adults are on wing in November and December.

== Subspecies ==
- P. c. cloetensi (Democratic Republic of the Congo: Mongala, Bas-Uele, Equateur, Kasai, Sankuru and Lualaba)
- P. c. albida Hawker-Smith, 1933 (Uganda: forested areas except the Bwamba Valley, north-western Tanzania)
- P. c. aspasia Grünberg, 1910 (southern Cameroon, Gabon, Congo, Equatorial Guinea)
- P. c. catauga Rebel, 1914 (Democratic Republic of the Congo: Haut-Uele, Ituri and North Kivu, Uganda: west to the Bwamba Valley)
- P. c. latefasciata Stempffer & Bennett, 1961 (Democratic Republic of the Congo: North Kivu and Maniema)
- P. c. lucayensis Schultze, 1923 (Democratic Republic of the Congo: Kinshasa)
