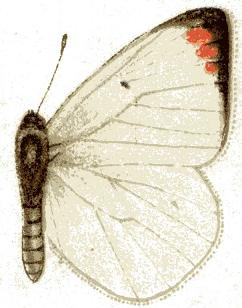

Scientific classification
- Kingdom: Animalia
- Phylum: Arthropoda
- Class: Insecta
- Order: Lepidoptera
- Family: Pieridae
- Genus: Colotis
- Species: C. elgonensis

Binomial name
- Colotis elgonensis (Sharpe, 1891)

Synonyms
- Teracolus elgonensis Sharpe, 1891; Colotis (Colotis) elgonensis; Pinacopteryx helena Grose-Smith, 1898; Colotis elgonensis f. masabae Stoneham, 1957; Teracolus elgonensis var. glauningi Schultze, 1909

= Colotis elgonensis =

Species of butterfly

Colotis elgonensis, the Elgon crimson tip or mountain crimson tip, is a butterfly in the family Pieridae. It is found in Nigeria, Cameroon, the Democratic Republic of the Congo, Sudan, Uganda, Rwanda, Burundi, Kenya and Tanzania. The habitat consists of undisturbed submontane forests.

The larvae feed on Maerua, Boscia, Capparis, Cadaba and Ritchiea species.

== Subspecies ==
- C. e. elgonensis (eastern Uganda, Kenya (west of the Rift Valley), north-western Tanzania)
- C. e. basilewskyi Berger, 1956 (Democratic Republic of the Congo, Rwanda, western Uganda, southern Sudan)
- C. e. glauningi (Schultze, 1909) (eastern Nigeria, north-western Cameroon)
- C. e. kenia Talbot, 1939 (Kenya)
- C. e. nobilis Carcasson, 1961 (western highlands of Tanzania)
