= Pyrrha (disambiguation) =

In Greek mythology, Pyrrha (/ˈpɪrə/; Ancient Greek: Πύρρα) was the daughter of Epimetheus and Pandora.

Pyrrha may also refer to:

- 632 Pyrrha, a minor planet
- Pyrrha (island), an island off Crete
- Pyrrha (Caria), a town of ancient Caria, now in Turkey
- Pyrrha (Euboea), an ancient town on the Greek island of Euboea
- Pyrrha (Lesbos), an ancient town on the Greek island of Lesbos
- Pyrrha (Lycia), a town of ancient Lycia, now in Turkey
- Pyrrha (Thessaly), a city in ancient Thessaly, Greece
- Celaenorrhinus pyrrha, a hesperiid butterfly
- Pyrrha Jewelry, a jewelry design company
- Pyrrha Alexandra, a character in Soul Calibur V
- Pyrrha Nikos, a character in RWBY
- An ode (1.5) by Horace
- A pseudonym used by Achilles on Skyros while he was in hiding before the Trojan War
