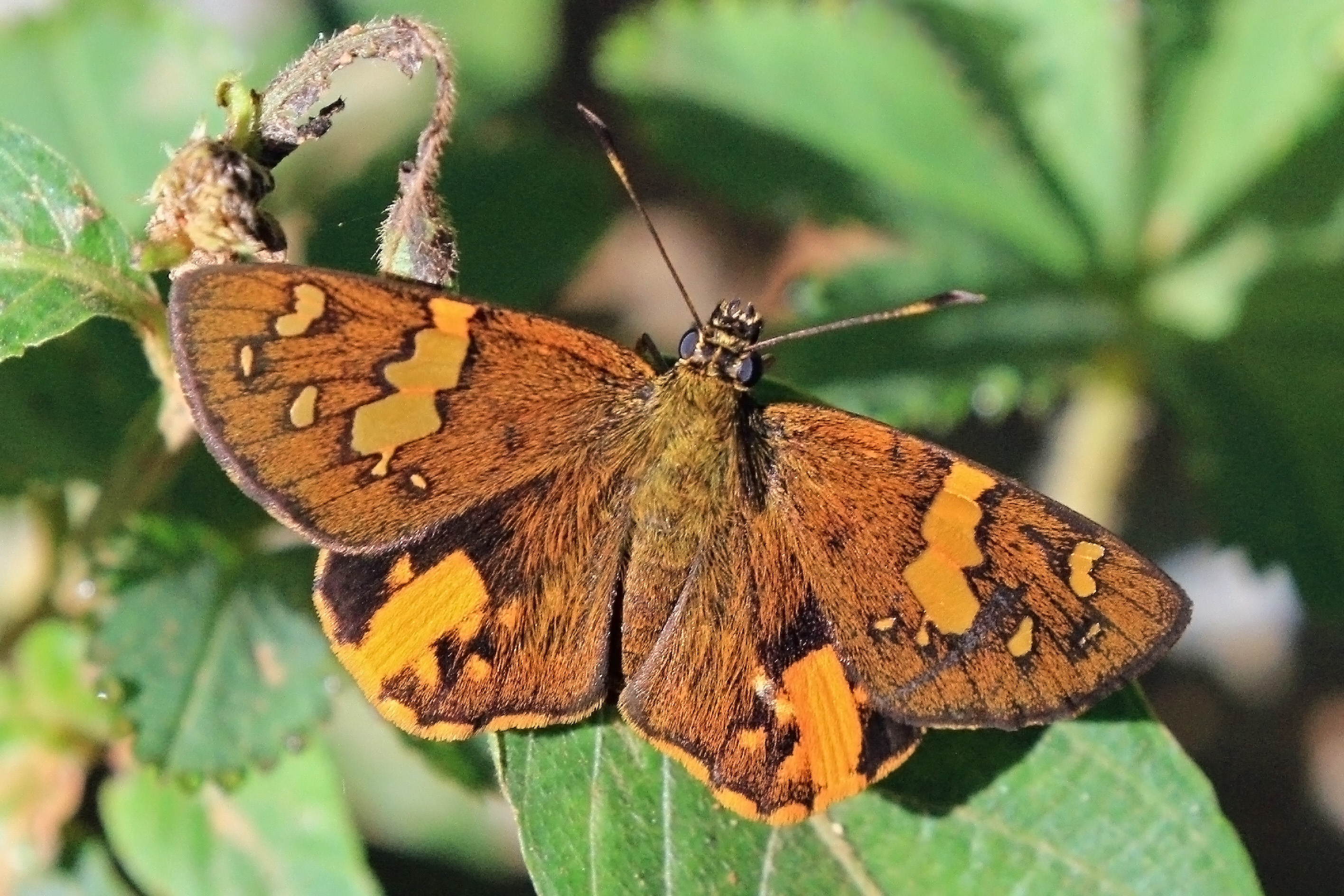
- Celaenorrhinus intermixtus

Scientific classification
- Kingdom: Animalia
- Phylum: Arthropoda
- Clade: Pancrustacea
- Class: Insecta
- Order: Lepidoptera
- Family: Hesperiidae
- Tribe: Celaenorrhinini
- Genus: Celaenorrhinus; Hübner, [1819]

Species
- Numerous, but see text

Synonyms
- Ancistrocampta C. & R. Felder, 1862; Hantana Moore, [1881]; Gehlota Doherty, 1889; Narga Mabille, 1891; Orneates Godman & Salvin, [1894]; Charmion de Nicéville, 1894

= Celaenorrhinus =

Sprites

Genus of butterflies

Celaenorrhinus is a genus of skipper butterflies which are commonly termed sprites. An alternate name is flats, for their habit of holding their wings flat when resting, but this is also used for related genera. They are the type genus of tribe Celaenorrhinini.

Celaenorrhinus species are found in most tropical regions. However, rather than a monophyletic genus the group appears to be a paraphyletic assemblage, and will probably be split up in the future.

== Species ==
The following species are recognised in the genus Celaenorrhinus and are split into three large species groups:

Africa species group

- Celaenorrhinus ambra Evans, 1937
- Celaenorrhinus ankasa Larsen & Miller, 2005
- Celaenorrhinus aureus Collins & Larsen, 2005
- Celaenorrhinus bakolo Miller, 1964
- Celaenorrhinus beni Bethune-Baker, 1908
- Celaenorrhinus bettoni Butler, 1902
- Celaenorrhinus boadicea (Hewitson, 1877)
- Celaenorrhinus chrysoglossa (Mabille, 1891)
- Celaenorrhinus cordeironis Kielland, 1992
- Celaenorrhinus dargei Berger, 1976
- Celaenorrhinus galenus (Fabricius, 1793)
- Celaenorrhinus handmani Collins & Congdon, 1998
- Celaenorrhinus hecqui Berger, 1976
- Celaenorrhinus homeyeri (Plötz, 1880)
- Celaenorrhinus humbloti (Mabille, 1884)
- Celaenorrhinus illustris (Mabille, 1891)
- Celaenorrhinus illustroides Miller, 1971
- Celaenorrhinus intermixtus Aurivillius, 1896
- Celaenorrhinus kasai Evans, 1956
- Celaenorrhinus kimboza Evans, 1949
- Celaenorrhinus kivuensis Joicey & Talbot, 1921
- Celaenorrhinus lourentis de Jong, 1976
- Celaenorrhinus macrostictus Holland, 1893
- Celaenorrhinus meditrina (Hewitson, 1877)
- Celaenorrhinus milleri Collins & Larsen, 2003
- Celaenorrhinus nigropunctata Bethune-Baker, 1908
- Celaenorrhinus nimba Collins & Larsen, 2000
- Celaenorrhinus ovalis Evans, 1937
- Celaenorrhinus perlustris Rebel, 1914
- Celaenorrhinus plagiatus Berger, 1976
- Celaenorrhinus proxima (Mabille, 1877)
- Celaenorrhinus rubeho Kielland, 1990
- Celaenorrhinus sagamase Collins & Larsen, 2005
- Celaenorrhinus sanjeensis Kielland, 1990
- Celaenorrhinus selysi Berger, 1955
- Celaenorrhinus suzannae Berger, 1976
- Celaenorrhinus toro Evans, 1937
- Celaenorrhinus uluguru Kielland, 1990
- Celaenorrhinus zanqua Evans, 1937

Asia species group

- Celaenorrhinus aspersa Leech, 1891
- Celaenorrhinus maculosa (C. & R. Felder, [1867])
- Celaenorrhinus inexspectus Devyatkin, 2000
- Celaenorrhinus phuongi Devyatkin, 2001
- Celaenorrhinus incestus Devyatkin, 2000
- Celaenorrhinus major Hsu, 1990
- Celaenorrhinus kuznetsovi Devyatkin, 2000
- Celaenorrhinus yaojiani Huang & Wu, 2003
- Celaenorrhinus oscula Evans, 1949
- Celaenorrhinus consanguinea Leech, 1891
- Celaenorrhinus ratna Fruhstorfer, 1909
- Celaenorrhinus pulomaya (Moore, [1866])
- Celaenorrhinus horishanus Shirôzu, 1963
- Celaenorrhinus pero de Nicéville, 1889
- Celaenorrhinus choui Gu, 1994
- Celaenorrhinus ruficornis (Mabille, 1878)
- Celaenorrhinus ambareesa (Moore, [1866])
- Celaenorrhinus spilothyrus (Felder, 1868)
- Celaenorrhinus sumitra (Moore, [1866])
- Celaenorrhinus pyrrha de Nicéville, 1889
- Celaenorrhinus pahangensis Naylor, 1962
- Celaenorrhinus leucocera (Kollar, [1844])
- Celaenorrhinus putra (Moore, [1866])
- Celaenorrhinus munda Moore, 1884
- Celaenorrhinus nigricans (de Nicéville, 1885)
- Celaenorrhinus asmara (Butler, [1879])
- Celaenorrhinus inaequalis Elwes & Edwards, 1897
- Celaenorrhinus ficulnea (Hewitson, 1868)
- Celaenorrhinus ladana (Butler, 1870)
- Celaenorrhinus patula de Nicéville, 1889
- Celaenorrhinus tibetana (Mabille, 1876)
- Celaenorrhinus andamanica (Wood-Mason & de Nicéville, 1881)
- Celaenorrhinus badia (Hewitson, 1877)
- Celaenorrhinus dhanada Moore, [1866]
- Celaenorrhinus bazilanus (Fruhstorfer, 1909)
- Celaenorrhinus entellus (Hewitson, 1867)
- Celaenorrhinus flavocincta (de Nicéville, 1887)
- Celaenorrhinus halconis de Jong & Treadaway, 1993
- Celaenorrhinus kiku Hering, 1918
- Celaenorrhinus kurosawai Shirôzu, 1963
- Celaenorrhinus morena Evans, 1949
- Celaenorrhinus patuloides de Jong, 1981
- Celaenorrhinus plagifera de Nicéville, 1889
- Celaenorrhinus saturatus Elwes & Edwards, 1897
- Celaenorrhinus toxopei de Jong, 1981
- Celaenorrhinus treadawayi de Jong, 1981
- Celaenorrhinus zea Swinhoe, 1909

America species group

- Celaenorrhinus aegiochus (Hewitson, 1876)
- Celaenorrhinus anchialus (Mabille, 1878)
- Celaenorrhinus approximatus Williams & Bell, 1940
- Celaenorrhinus astrigera (Butler, 1877)
- Celaenorrhinus autochton Steinhauser & Austin, 1996
- Celaenorrhinus bifurcus Bell, 1934
- Celaenorrhinus cynapes (Hewitson, 1870)
- Celaenorrhinus disjunctus Bell, 1940
- Celaenorrhinus eligius (Stoll, [1781])
- Celaenorrhinus fritzgaertneri (Bailey, 1880)
- Celaenorrhinus jao (Mabille, 1889)
- Celaenorrhinus monartus (Plötz, 1884)
- Celaenorrhinus orneates Austin, 1996
- Celaenorrhinus par Steinhauser & Austin, 1996
- Celaenorrhinus savia (Evans, 1952)
- Celaenorrhinus shema (Hewitson, 1877)
- Celaenorrhinus similis Hayward, 1933
- Celaenorrhinus songoensis Draudt, 1922
- Celaenorrhinus stallingsi Freeman, 1946
- Celaenorrhinus stola Evans, 1952
- Celaenorrhinus suthina (Hewitson, 1877)
- Celaenorrhinus syllius (C. & R. Felder, 1862)
- Celaenorrhinus tritonae (Weeks, 1901)
- Celaenorrhinus vagra Evans, 1952

=== Former species ===
- Celaenorrhinus aurivittata (Moore, 1878) - transferred to Aurivittia aurivittata (Moore, 1878)
- Celaenorrhinus mokeezi (Wallengren, 1857) - transferred to Apallaga mokeezi (Wallengren, 1857)
- Celaenorrhinus pooanus Aurivillius, 1910 - transferred to Apallaga pooanus (Aurivillius, 1910)
- Celaenorrhinus rutilans (Mabille, 1877) - transferred to Apallaga rutilans (Mabille, 1877)
- Celaenorrhinus vietnamicus Devyatkin, 1998 - transferred to Aurivittia vietnamicus (Devyatkin, 1998)

== Genus characteristics ==
Plate from Adalbert Seitz's Macrolepidoptera of the World IX

The following is a description of the genus from an old work and may not account for more recent taxonomic changes.

Forewing, costa slightly arched, apex rather acute, outer margin convex, inner margin straight; costal nervure terminating opposite the apex of the discoidal cell, first, second, and third subcostal nervules with their bases almost equidistant, fourth subcostal with its base half as near to the base of the third subcostal as that vein is to the second, terminating at the apex of the wing, terminal portion of subcostal nervure. or fifth subcostal nervule with its base almost touching that of the fourth, terminating on the outer margin far below the apex of the wing; discoidal cell long, narrow; upper disco-cellular nervule straight, strongly outwardly oblique, very short; middle and lower disco-cellular nervules almost in the same straight line (the lower a little concave), the lower a little longer than the upper, both veins taken together strongly inwardly oblique; second median nervule arising some little distance before the lower end of the cell, first median nervule arising much nearer to the base of the wing than to the point where the second median is given off; submedian nervure slightly recurved; internal nervure short and quickly running into the submedian nervure, with which it entirely anastomoses. Hindwing, costa strongly arched at base then straight to apex, which latter is somewhat acute in the male, rounded in the female, outer margin rounded, inner margin convex; costal nervure almost straight, terminating just before the apex of the wing; first subcostal nervule originating some distance before the apex of the cell; upper disco-cellular nervule straight, very slightly outwardly oblique; lower disco-cellular also slightly outwardly oblique, at first concave, then straight, a little longer than the upper disco-cellular; discoidal nervule very fine, straight, arising at the point of junction of the disco-cellular nervules; second median nervule arising just before the lower end of the cell, first median arising much nearer the lower end of the cell than the base of the wing; submedian and internal nervures straight. Type: the Papilio eligius of Cramer.

This diagnosis has been made from bleached wings of both sexes of the "Hesperia" leucocera of Kollar, from Simla, and of the "Papilio" eligius of Cramer from the Amazons, for the specimens of which latter I am indebted to Dr. O. Staudinger. All the species of the genus settle with wide outspread wings, which at once distinguishes them in life from the genus Notocrypta, mihi, the species of which rest with wings folded upright over the back. C. leucocera in the Western Himalayas is markedly crepuscular, I have seen specimens over and over again flying up and down a short distance of the bed of the Simla river with immense rapidity, so fast that the eye can hardly follow them, settling on a leaf for a second and then flying off again, long after the sun has set. All that are known to me have the hindwing more or less spotted. C. eligius, Cramer, was described from Surinam in South America, and Felder states that he has received a specimen from Venezuela.

The similarity in the markings of the forewing of this species to those of C. maculosa, Felder, from Shanghai, is not a little remarkable. The transformations of only one species are known, those of C. spilothyrus, Felder." (de Niceville)

— Edward Yerbury Watson
