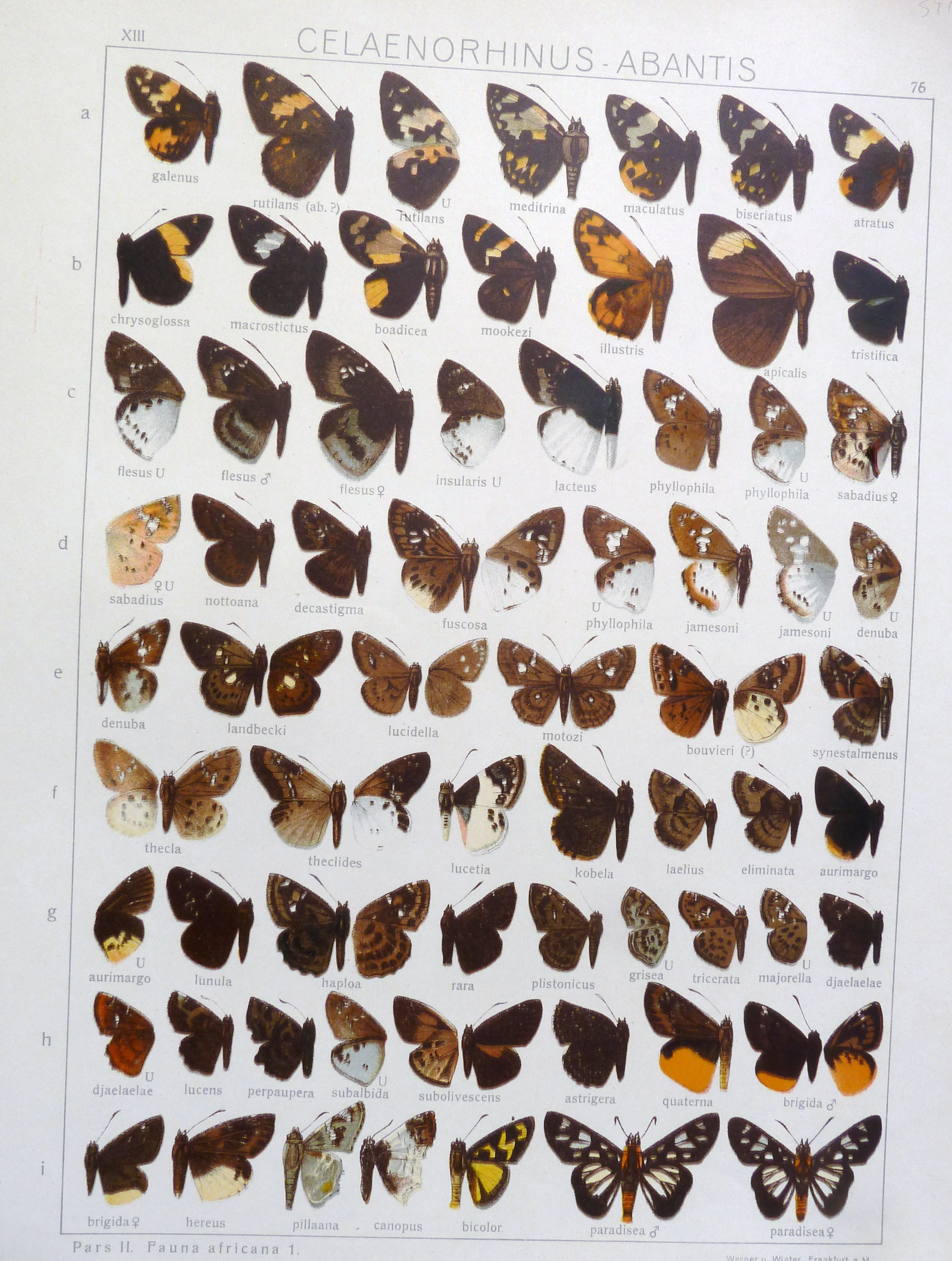

Scientific classification
- Kingdom: Animalia
- Phylum: Arthropoda
- Class: Insecta
- Order: Lepidoptera
- Family: Hesperiidae
- Genus: Celaenorrhinus
- Species: C. macrostictus

Binomial name
- Celaenorrhinus macrostictus Holland, 1893

= Celaenorrhinus macrostictus =

Species of butterfly

Celaenorrhinus macrostictus is a species of butterfly in the family Hesperiidae. It is found in Gabon, the Democratic Republic of the Congo, Uganda and western Kenya. The habitat consists of forests.
