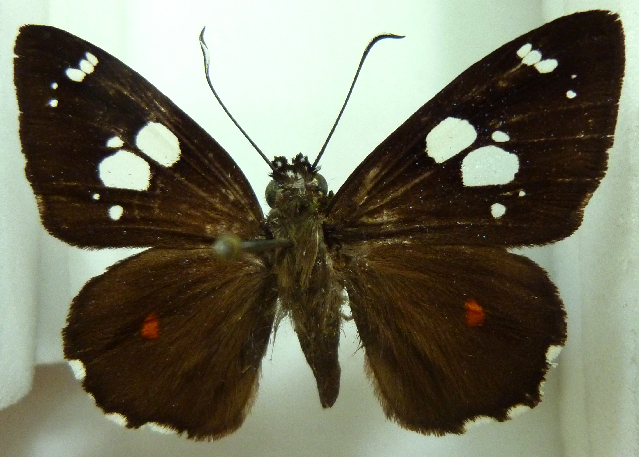

Scientific classification
- Kingdom: Animalia
- Phylum: Arthropoda
- Class: Insecta
- Order: Lepidoptera
- Family: Hesperiidae
- Genus: Celaenorrhinus
- Species: C. humbloti

Binomial name
- Celaenorrhinus humbloti (Mabille, 1884)

Synonyms
- Plesioneura humbloti Mabille, 1884

= Celaenorrhinus humbloti =

Species of butterfly

Celaenorrhinus humbloti is a species of butterfly in the family Hesperiidae. It is found on Madagascar. The habitat consists of forests.
