= Celaenorrhinus kivuensis =

Scientific classification
- Kingdom: Animalia
- Phylum: Arthropoda
- Class: Insecta
- Order: Lepidoptera
- Family: Hesperiidae
- Genus: Celaenorrhinus
- Species: C. kivuensis

Binomial name
- Celaenorrhinus kivuensis Joicey & Talbot, 1921

Synonyms
- Celaenorrhinus mozeeki kivuensis Joicey & Talbot, 1921

Species of butterfly

Celaenorrhinus kivuensis is a species of butterfly in the family Hesperiidae. It is found in the Democratic Republic of the Congo (from the east to Kivu) and Uganda (from the west to Kayonza).
