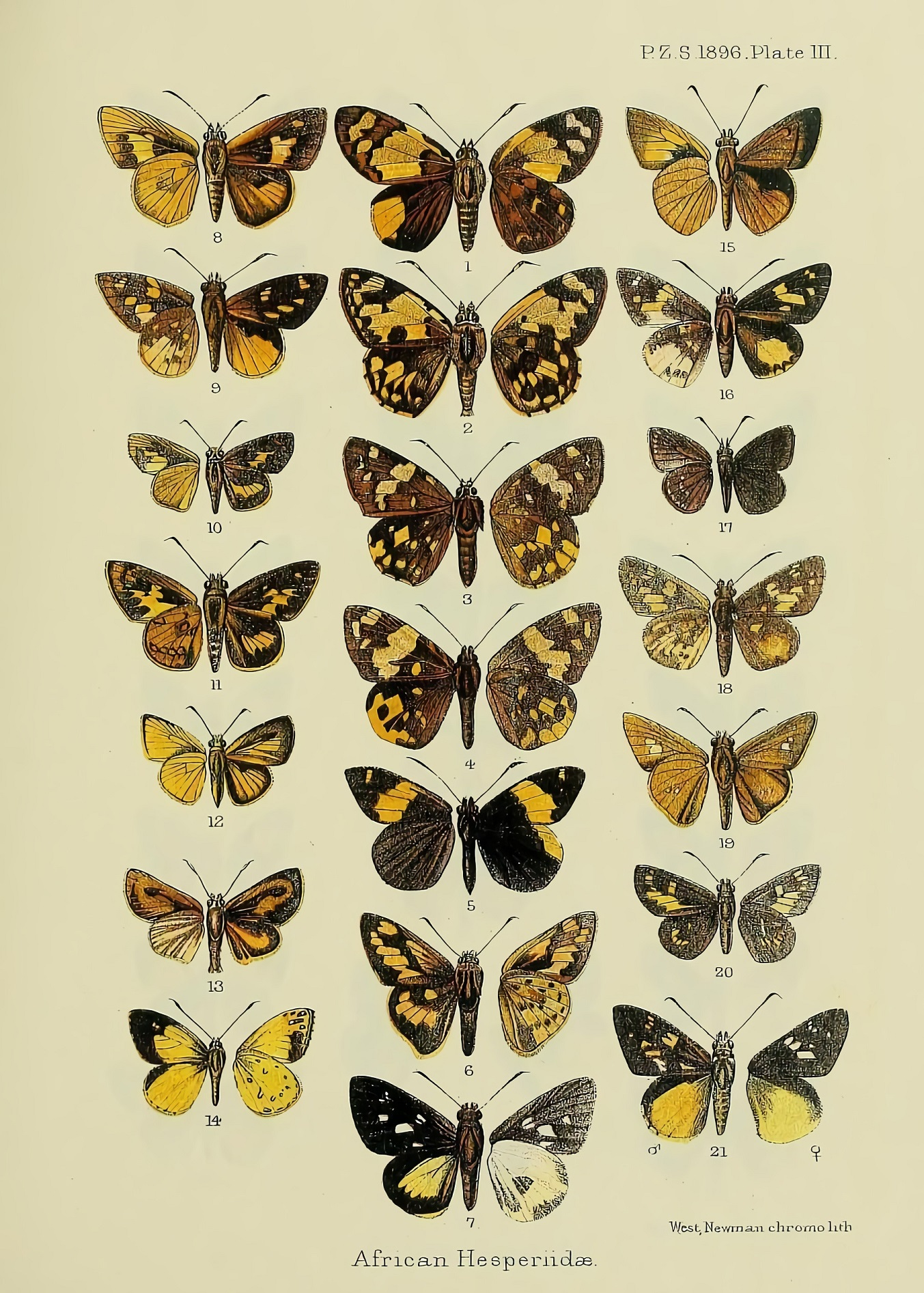
- Figure 1

Scientific classification
- Kingdom: Animalia
- Phylum: Arthropoda
- Class: Insecta
- Order: Lepidoptera
- Family: Hesperiidae
- Genus: Celaenorrhinus
- Species: C. boadicea

Binomial name
- Celaenorrhinus boadicea (Hewitson, 1877)

Synonyms
- List: Pterygospidea boadicea Hewitson, 1877; Pardaleodes atratus Mabille, 1891; Celaenorrhinus atratus; Celaenirhinus collucens Holland, 1894; Pardaleodes lucens Mabille; Holland, 1896

= Celaenorrhinus boadicea =

Boadicea's sprite

Species of butterfly

Celaenorrhinus boadicea, commonly known as Boadicea's sprite, is a species of butterfly in the family Hesperiidae. It is found in Nigeria, Cameroon, Gabon, the Republic of the Congo, the Democratic Republic of the Congo, Uganda, Tanzania and Zambia. The habitat consists of forests, but it is also found in agricultural lands with a full canopy.

== Subspecies ==
- Celaenorrhinus boadicea boadicea (Nigeria, Cameroon, Gabon, Congo, eastern Democratic Republic of the Congo, Zambia)
- Celaenorrhinus boadicea howarthi Berger, 1976 (Democratic Republic of the Congo: Ituri, Uganda, north-western Tanzania)
