= Celaenorrhinus zanqua =

Scientific classification
- Kingdom: Animalia
- Phylum: Arthropoda
- Class: Insecta
- Order: Lepidoptera
- Family: Hesperiidae
- Genus: Celaenorrhinus
- Species: C. zanqua

Binomial name
- Celaenorrhinus zanqua Evans, 1937

Species of butterfly

Celaenorrhinus zanqua is a species of butterfly in the family Hesperiidae. It is found in Tanzania and Malawi. The habitat consists of forests.
