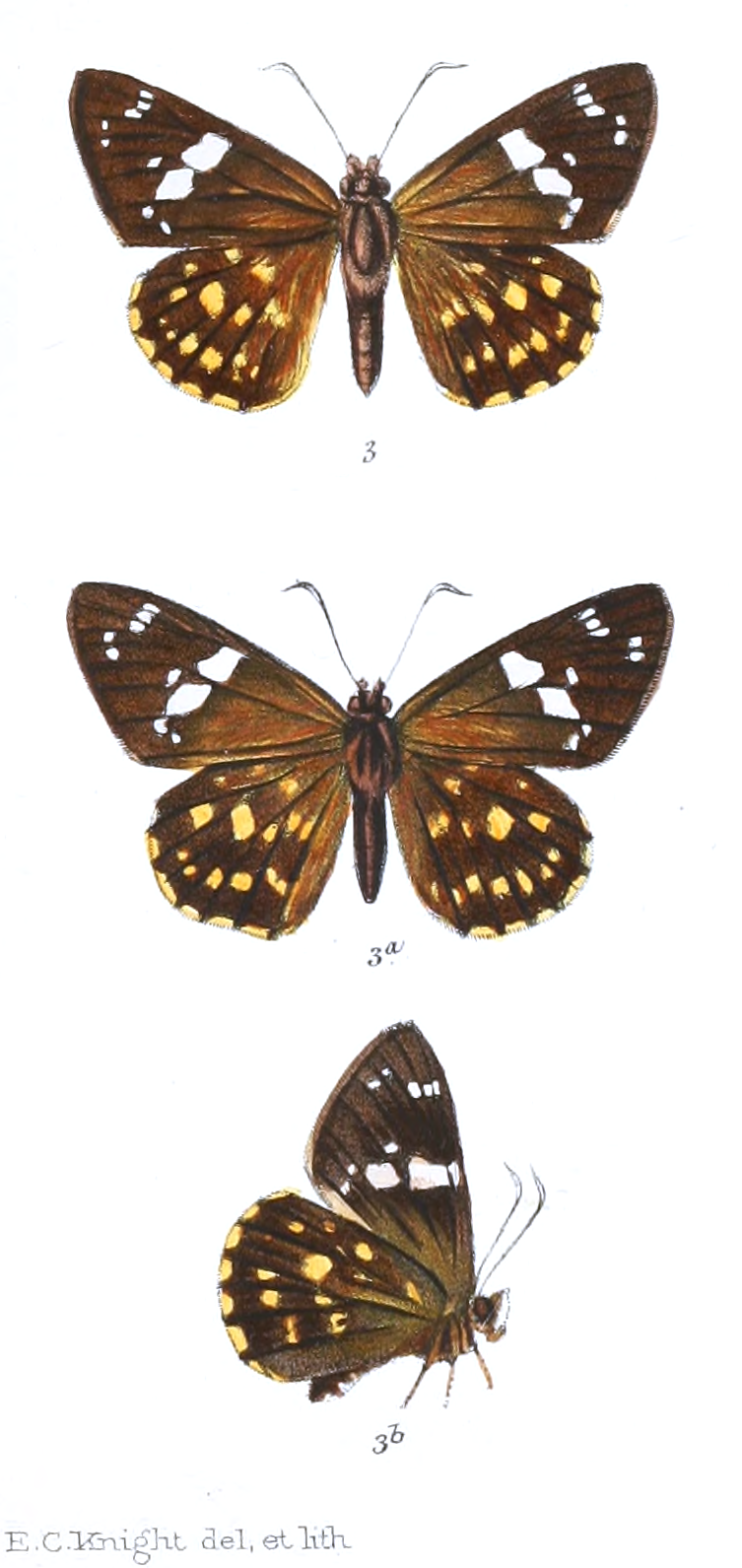

Scientific classification
- Kingdom: Animalia
- Phylum: Arthropoda
- Class: Insecta
- Order: Lepidoptera
- Family: Hesperiidae
- Genus: Celaenorrhinus
- Species: C. plagifera

Binomial name
- Celaenorrhinus plagifera de Nicéville, 1889

= Celaenorrhinus plagifera =

Species of butterfly

Celaenorrhinus plagifera is a species of butterfly in the family Hesperiidae. It is found in Sikkim, India.
