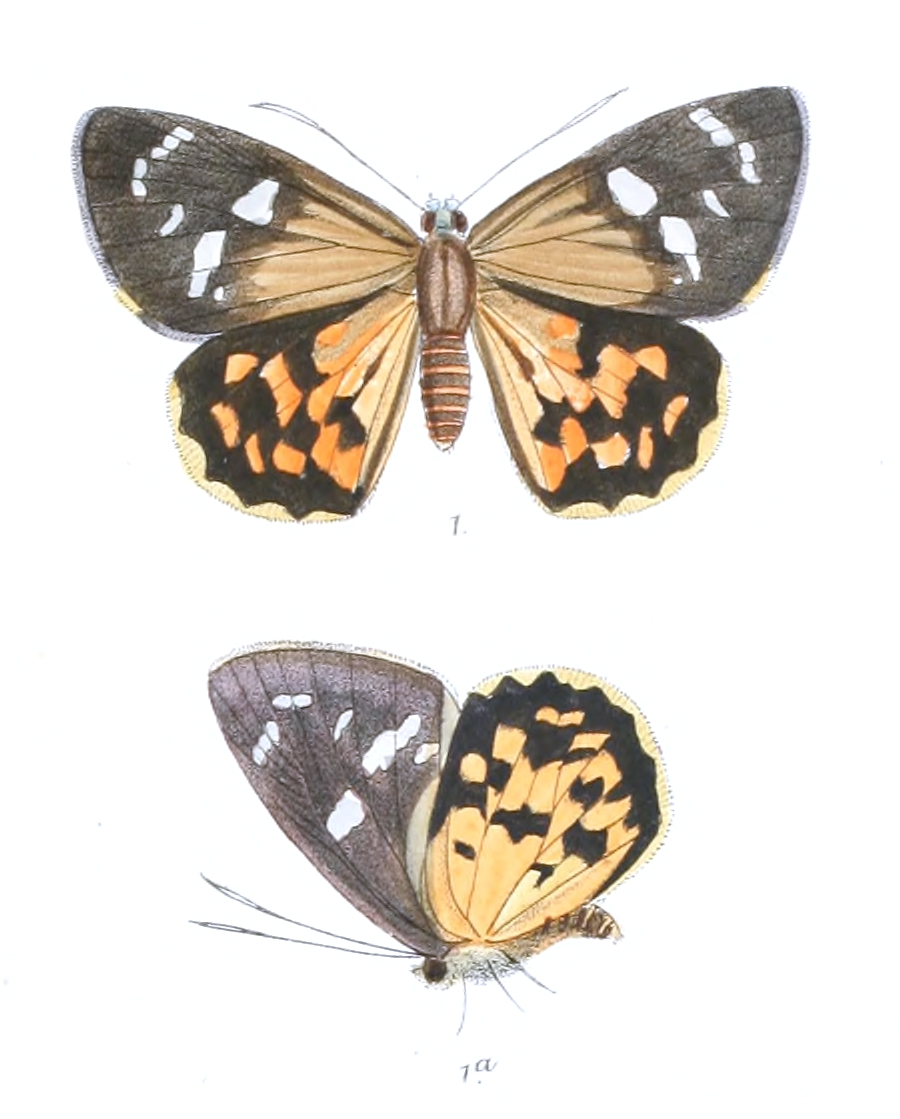
- Male and female (underside)

Scientific classification
- Kingdom: Animalia
- Phylum: Arthropoda
- Class: Insecta
- Order: Lepidoptera
- Family: Hesperiidae
- Genus: Celaenorrhinus
- Species: C. flavocincta

Binomial name
- Celaenorrhinus flavocincta (de Nicéville, 1887)

Synonyms
- Plesioneura flavocincta de Nicéville, 1887

= Celaenorrhinus flavocincta =

Species of butterfly

Celaenorrhinus flavocincta is a species of skipper butterfly found in Asia, including Bhutan.
