= Celaenorrhinus beni =

Scientific classification
- Kingdom: Animalia
- Phylum: Arthropoda
- Class: Insecta
- Order: Lepidoptera
- Family: Hesperiidae
- Genus: Celaenorrhinus
- Species: C. beni

Binomial name
- Celaenorrhinus beni Bethune-Baker, 1908

Species of butterfly

Celaenorrhinus beni is a species of butterfly in the family Hesperiidae. It is found in the Republic of the Congo and the Democratic Republic of the Congo.

== Subspecies ==
- Celaenorrhinus beni beni (Democratic Republic of the Congo: north-east to Ituri)
- Celaenorrhinus beni jacquelinae Miller, 1971 (Congo)
