= Celaenorrhinus selysi =

Scientific classification
- Kingdom: Animalia
- Phylum: Arthropoda
- Class: Insecta
- Order: Lepidoptera
- Family: Hesperiidae
- Genus: Celaenorrhinus
- Species: C. selysi

Binomial name
- Celaenorrhinus selysi Berger, 1955

Species of butterfly

Celaenorrhinus selysi is a species of butterfly in the family Hesperiidae. It is found in the south-eastern part of the Democratic Republic of the Congo.
