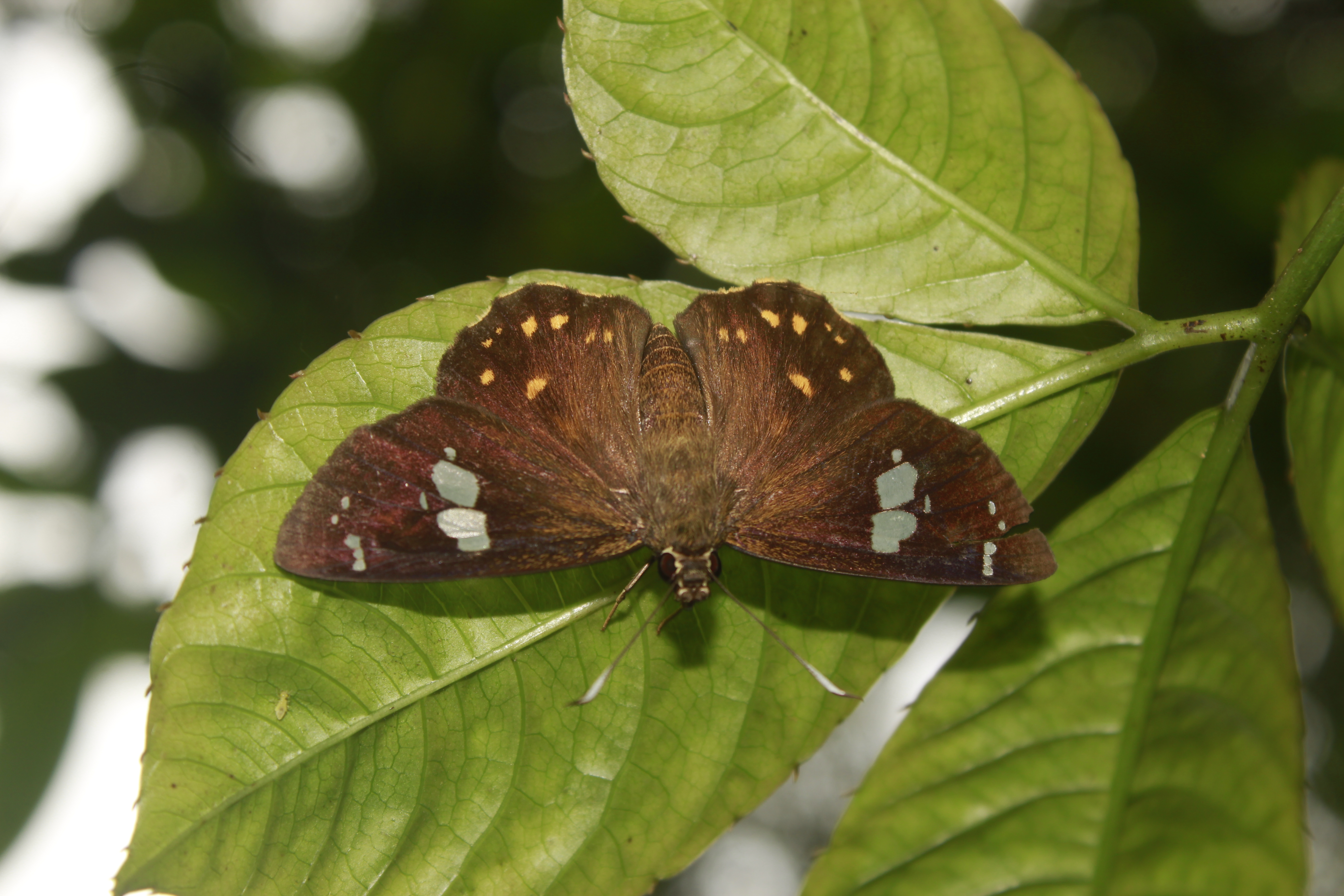
- Celaenorrhinus pero in Seitz

Scientific classification
- Kingdom: Animalia
- Phylum: Arthropoda
- Class: Insecta
- Order: Lepidoptera
- Family: Hesperiidae
- Genus: Celaenorrhinus
- Species: C. pero

Binomial name
- Celaenorrhinus pero de Nicéville, 1889

= Celaenorrhinus pero =

Mussoorie pied flat

Species of butterfly

Celaenorrhinus pero, the Mussoorie pied flat, is a species of hesperiid butterfly found in South Asia.

== Range ==
The butterfly occurs in India, Myanmar, North Thailand and western China. In India, the butterfly ranges from Mussoorie (Uttarakhand) to Sikkim, Assam and Nagaland and eastwards towards Myanmar.

== Status ==
Rare.

== See also ==
- Hesperiidae
- List of butterflies of India (Pyrginae)
- List of butterflies of India (Hesperiidae)
