= Celaenorrhinus lourentis =

Scientific classification
- Kingdom: Animalia
- Phylum: Arthropoda
- Class: Insecta
- Order: Lepidoptera
- Family: Hesperiidae
- Genus: Celaenorrhinus
- Species: C. lourentis

Binomial name
- Celaenorrhinus lourentis de Jong, 1976

Species of butterfly

Celaenorrhinus lourentis is a species of butterfly in the family Hesperiidae. It is found in the Kakamega Forest of Kenya.
