= Celaenorrhinus nimba =

Scientific classification
- Kingdom: Animalia
- Phylum: Arthropoda
- Class: Insecta
- Order: Lepidoptera
- Family: Hesperiidae
- Genus: Celaenorrhinus
- Species: C. nimba

Binomial name
- Celaenorrhinus nimba Collins & Larsen, 2000

Species of butterfly

Celaenorrhinus nimba, commonly known as the Nimba sprite, is a species of butterfly in the family Hesperiidae. It is found in the Nimba Range of Ivory Coast. The habitat consists of forests.
