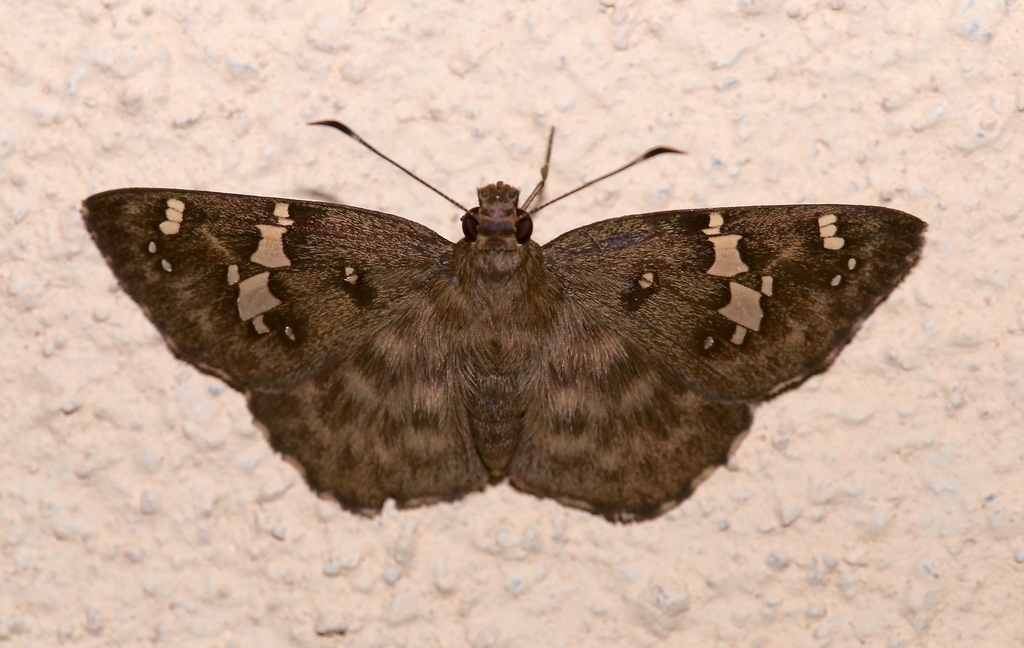

Scientific classification
- Kingdom: Animalia
- Phylum: Arthropoda
- Class: Insecta
- Order: Lepidoptera
- Family: Hesperiidae
- Genus: Celaenorrhinus
- Species: C. fritzgaertneri

Binomial name
- Celaenorrhinus fritzgaertneri (Bailey, 1880)

Synonyms
- Celaenorrhinus variegatus Godman and Salvin, 1894

= Celaenorrhinus fritzgaertneri =

Species of butterfly

Celaenorrhinus fritzgaertneri, or Fritzgaertner's flat, is a species of spread-wing skipper in the butterfly family Hesperiidae. It is found in Central America and North America.

== Subspecies ==
These two subspecies belong to the species Celaenorrhinus fritzgaertneri:

- Celaenorrhinus fritzgaertneri fritzgaertneri
- Celaenorrhinus fritzgaertneri variegatus Godman & Salvin, 1894
