= Celaenorrhinus cordeironis =

Scientific classification
- Kingdom: Animalia
- Phylum: Arthropoda
- Class: Insecta
- Order: Lepidoptera
- Family: Hesperiidae
- Genus: Celaenorrhinus
- Species: C. cordeironis

Binomial name
- Celaenorrhinus cordeironis Kielland, 1992

Species of butterfly

Celaenorrhinus cordeironis is a species of butterfly in the family Hesperiidae. It is found in north-eastern Tanzania. The habitat consists of lowland forests up to altitudes of 300 meters on the East Usambara Mountains.

Adults have been recorded in July.
