= Celaenorrhinus uluguru =

Scientific classification
- Kingdom: Animalia
- Phylum: Arthropoda
- Class: Insecta
- Order: Lepidoptera
- Family: Hesperiidae
- Genus: Celaenorrhinus
- Species: C. uluguru

Binomial name
- Celaenorrhinus uluguru Kielland, 1990

Species of butterfly

Celaenorrhinus uluguru is a species of butterfly in the family Hesperiidae. It is found in the Uluguru Mountains of Tanzania, where it is endemic to Bondwa Mountain. The habitat consists of forests at altitudes between 1,450 and 1,800 meters.

The length of the forewings is 19.7-20.4 mm for males. Adult males mud-puddle and feed from flowering herbs.
