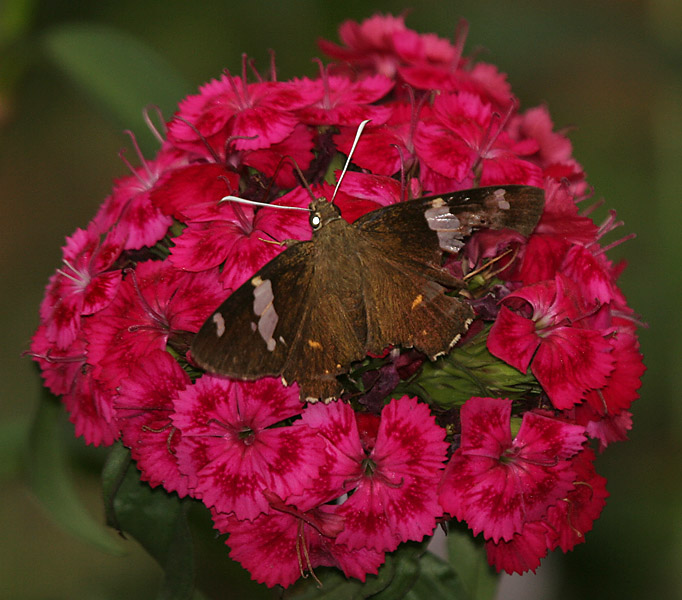

Scientific classification
- Kingdom: Animalia
- Phylum: Arthropoda
- Class: Insecta
- Order: Lepidoptera
- Family: Hesperiidae
- Genus: Celaenorrhinus
- Species: C. patula

Binomial name
- Celaenorrhinus patula de Nicéville, 1889

Synonyms
- Celaenorrhinus dayaoensis Koiwaya, 1996

= Celaenorrhinus patula =

Large spotted flat

Species of butterfly

Celaenorrhinus patula, the large spotted flat, is a species of butterfly in the family Hesperiidae. It is found in Tibet, eastern India, Myanmar, and in northern Thailand.

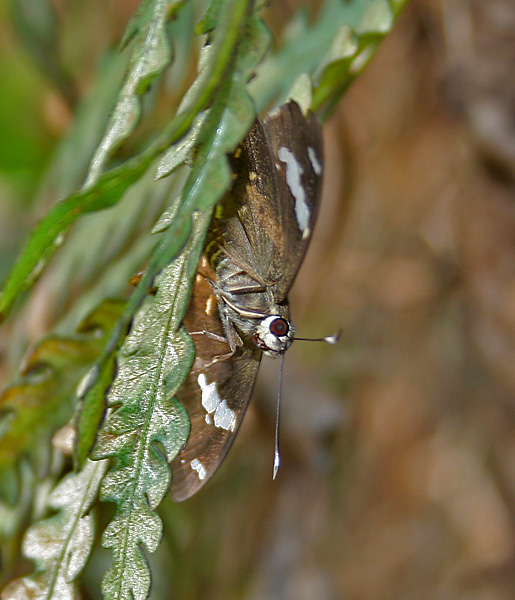
