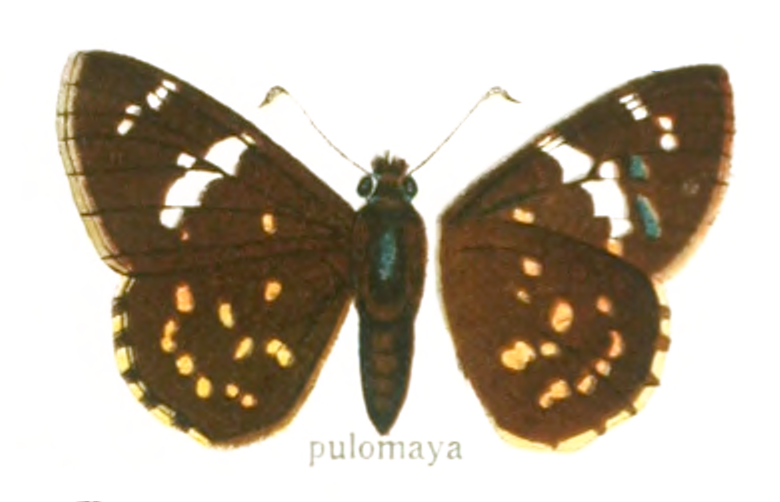

Scientific classification
- Kingdom: Animalia
- Phylum: Arthropoda
- Class: Insecta
- Order: Lepidoptera
- Family: Hesperiidae
- Genus: Celaenorrhinus
- Species: C. pulomaya

Binomial name
- Celaenorrhinus pulomaya (Moore, 1865)

= Celaenorrhinus pulomaya =

Multi-spotted flat

Species of butterfly

Celaenorrhinus pulomaya, commonly known as the multi-spotted flat, is a species of hesperiid butterfly found in Asia.

== Range ==
The butterfly occurs in the Himalayas and western China.

== Description ==
Male, dark olive-brown, yellowish-olive basally: forewing with four oblique discal semi-transparent white spots, the two upper large, one within and the other beneath the extremity of the cell, the third small and beneath the second, fourth also small and exterior to the juncture of the upper two obliquely, before the apex, are five small similar spots, the upper three being conjugated; near posterior margin are two small orange-yellow spots, the first being one-third from the base, the other one-third from posterior angle: hindwing with three rows of irregular-shaped well-defined bright orange spots; cilia of hindwing broad, alternate brown and orange-yellow. Underside as above. Top of head black, with a marginal yellow narrow line on each side. Palpi above black, tipped with yellow. Palpi, thorax, and legs beneath yellow. Antennae with yellow subapical streak.

— Edward Yerbury Watson

== See also ==
- Hesperiidae
- List of butterflies of India (Pyrginae)
- List of butterflies of India (Hesperiidae)
