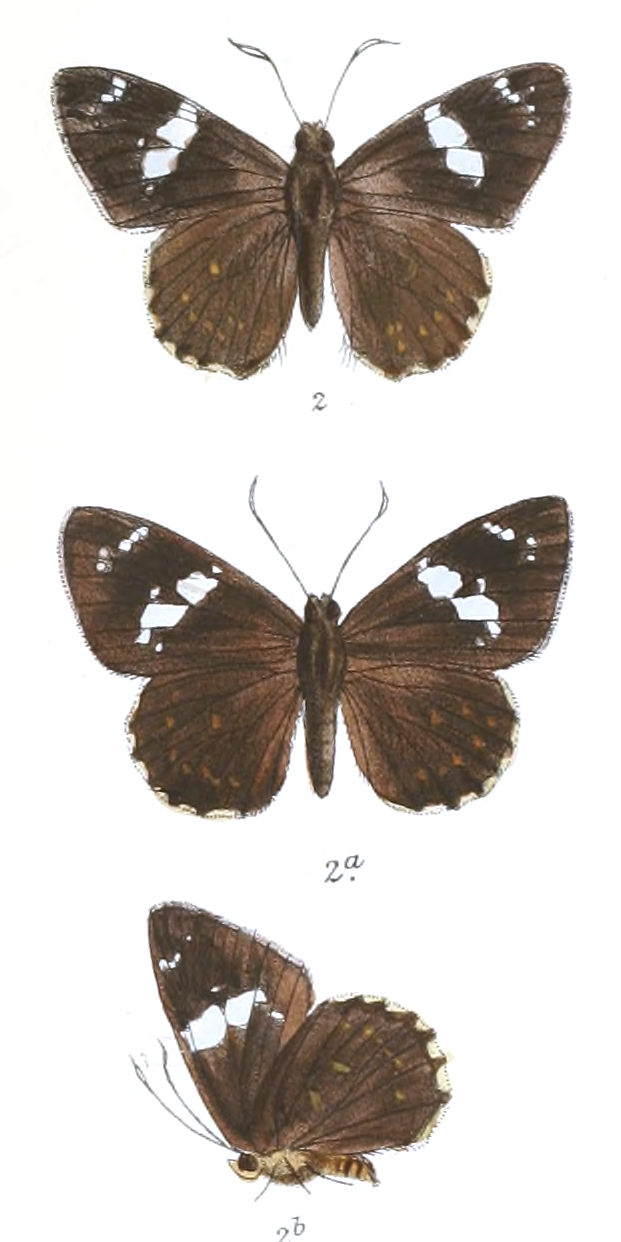
- Subspecies C. m. maculicornis

Scientific classification
- Kingdom: Animalia
- Phylum: Arthropoda
- Class: Insecta
- Order: Lepidoptera
- Family: Hesperiidae
- Genus: Celaenorrhinus
- Species: C. munda

Binomial name
- Celaenorrhinus munda (Moore, 1884)

= Celaenorrhinus munda =

Himalayan spotted flat

Species of butterfly

Celaenorrhinus munda, also known as the Himalayan spotted flat, is a species of hesperiid butterfly found in South Asia.

== Range ==
The butterfly occurs in India, Pakistan and Myanmar. It ranges from Simla in Himachal Pradesh, India, to Pakistan, and eastwards to the southern Shan states in Myanmar.

== Status ==
William Harry Evans described this species as rare in 1932.

== See also ==
- Hesperiidae
- List of butterflies of India (Hesperiidae)
