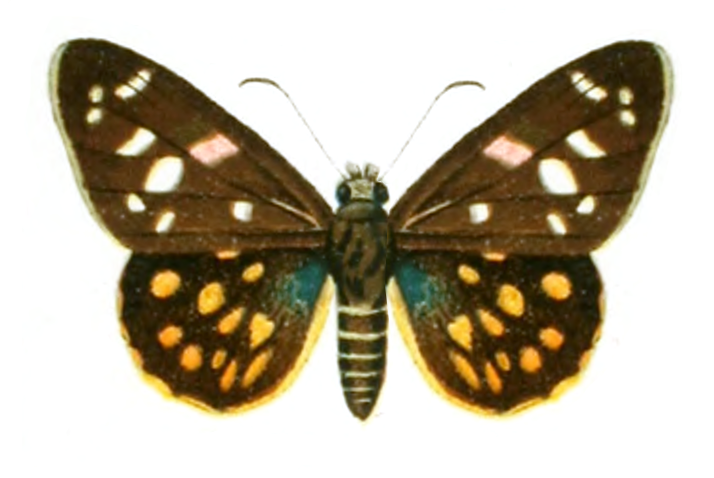

Scientific classification
- Kingdom: Animalia
- Phylum: Arthropoda
- Class: Insecta
- Order: Lepidoptera
- Family: Hesperiidae
- Genus: Celaenorrhinus
- Species: C. aspersa

Binomial name
- Celaenorrhinus aspersa Leech, 1891

= Celaenorrhinus aspersa =

Large streaked flat

Species of butterfly

Celaenorrhinus aspersa, commonly known as the large streaked flat, is a species of hesperiid butterfly which is found in the Indomalayan realm.

== Range ==
The butterfly occurs in India, north Myanmar, north Thailand, Hainan and western China. In India, the butterfly ranges from Assam eastwards to Nagaland and on to Myanmar.

== Status ==
Very rare.

== See also ==
- Hesperiidae
- List of butterflies of India (Pyrginae)
- List of butterflies of India (Hesperiidae)
