= Celaenorrhinus ankasa =

Scientific classification
- Kingdom: Animalia
- Phylum: Arthropoda
- Class: Insecta
- Order: Lepidoptera
- Family: Hesperiidae
- Genus: Celaenorrhinus
- Species: C. ankasa

Binomial name
- Celaenorrhinus ankasa Larsen & Miller, 2005

Species of butterfly

Celaenorrhinus ankasa, commonly known as the Ankasa sprite, is a species of butterfly in the family Hesperiidae. It is found in Ghana. The habitat consists of forests.
