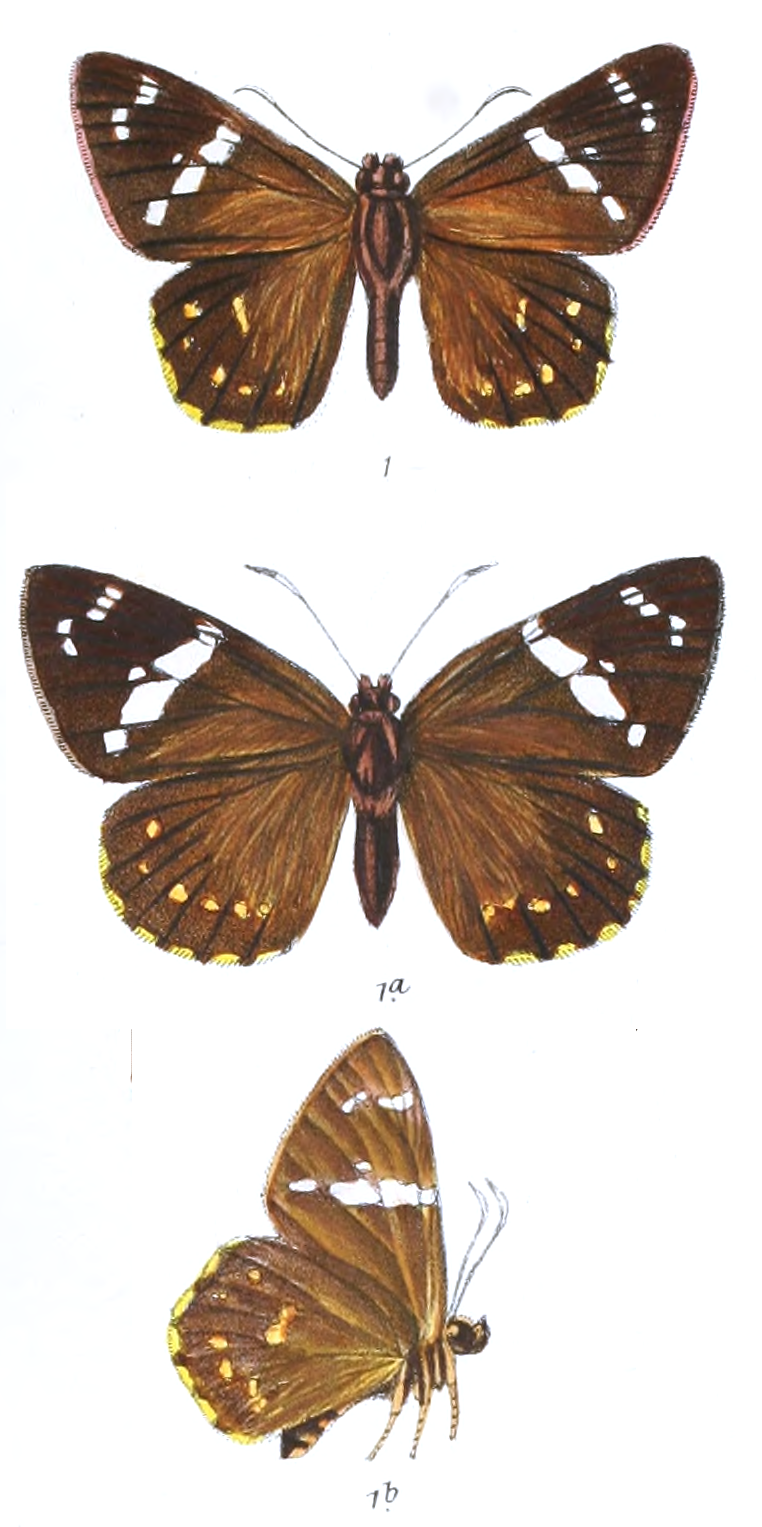

Scientific classification
- Kingdom: Animalia
- Phylum: Arthropoda
- Class: Insecta
- Order: Lepidoptera
- Family: Hesperiidae
- Genus: Celaenorrhinus
- Species: C. sumitra

Binomial name
- Celaenorrhinus sumitra (Moore, [1866])

Synonyms
- Plesioneura sumitra Moore, [1866]

= Celaenorrhinus sumitra =

Species of butterfly

Celaenorrhinus sumitra is a species of butterfly in the family Hesperiidae. It is found in India.
