= Celaenorrhinus toro =

Scientific classification
- Kingdom: Animalia
- Phylum: Arthropoda
- Class: Insecta
- Order: Lepidoptera
- Family: Hesperiidae
- Genus: Celaenorrhinus
- Species: C. toro

Binomial name
- Celaenorrhinus toro Evans, 1937

Synonyms
- Celaenorrhinus proxima toro Evans, 1937

Species of butterfly

Celaenorrhinus toro, commonly known as the Toro sprite, is a species of butterfly in the family Hesperiidae. It is found in the Toro district, Uganda. The habitat consists of forests.
