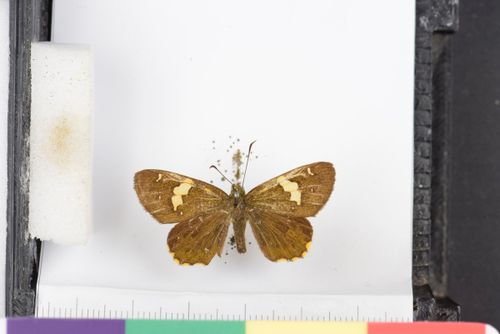

Scientific classification
- Kingdom: Animalia
- Phylum: Arthropoda
- Class: Insecta
- Order: Lepidoptera
- Family: Hesperiidae
- Genus: Celaenorrhinus
- Species: C. homeyeri

Binomial name
- Celaenorrhinus homeyeri (Plötz, 1880)

Synonyms
- Tagiades homeyeri Plötz, 1880

= Celaenorrhinus homeyeri =

Species of butterfly

Celaenorrhinus homeyeri, commonly known as Homeyer's sprite, is a species of butterfly in the family Hesperiidae. It is found in Cameroon, Angola, the Republic of the Congo, the Democratic Republic of the Congo, Uganda, western Tanzania and Zambia. The habitat consists of forests at altitudes ranging from 800 to 1,700 meters in Tanzania.
