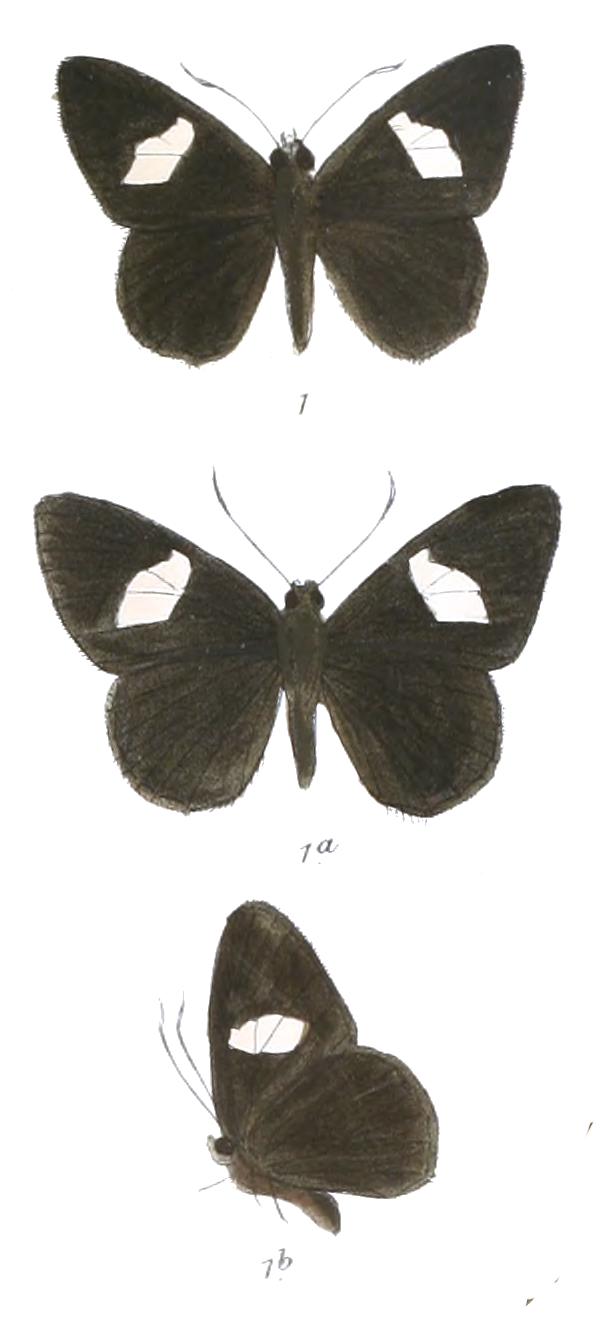

Scientific classification
- Kingdom: Animalia
- Phylum: Arthropoda
- Class: Insecta
- Order: Lepidoptera
- Family: Hesperiidae
- Genus: Celaenorrhinus
- Species: C. ficulnea

Binomial name
- Celaenorrhinus ficulnea (Hewitson, 1868)

Synonyms
- List: Hesperia ficulnea Hewitson, 1868; Plesioneura signata Druce, 1873; Charmion ficulnea (Hewitson, 1878); Plesioneura crona Hewitson, 1878; Plesioneura tola Hewitson, 1878; Charmion tola (Hewitson, 1878); Plesioneura queda Plötz, 1885; Charmion ficulnea nibana Fruhstorfer, 1910; *Plesioneura zawi Plötz, 1885

= Celaenorrhinus ficulnea =

Species of butterfly

Celaenorrhinus ficulnea, the velvet flat, is a species of butterfly in the family Hesperiidae. It is found in south-east Asia. The typical form exhibits the white central spot of the forewing above and beneath straightly cut off by the lower median branch. In some taxonomic schemes (e.g. after Zhang, 2023), the species is instead listed as the sole member of the genus Charmion de Nicéville, 1894.

The larvae feed on Didissandra (Gesneriaceae) species.

== Subspecies ==
- Celaenorrhinus ficulnea crona (Hewitson, 1878) - Indonesia (Bacan Islands, "Batchian")
- Celaenorrhinus ficulnea ficulnea (Hewitson, 1878) - Malaysia/Indonesia (Borneo)
- Celaenorrhinus ficulnea niasica Mabille, 1913. - Indonesia (Sumatra: Nias)
- Celaenorrhinus ficulnea queda (Plötz, 1885) - India (Assam), Myanmar, Thailand, Malaysia (Malay Peninsula, Tioman), Indonesia (Sumatra)
- Celaenorrhinus ficulnea tola (Hewitson, 1878) - Indonesia (Sulawesi, Maluku) [=ficulnea zawi (Plötz, 1885) per Seitz, 1927]
