= Celaenorrhinus illustroides =

Scientific classification
- Kingdom: Animalia
- Phylum: Arthropoda
- Class: Insecta
- Order: Lepidoptera
- Family: Hesperiidae
- Genus: Celaenorrhinus
- Species: C. illustroides

Binomial name
- Celaenorrhinus illustroides Miller, 1971

Species of butterfly

Celaenorrhinus illustroides is a species of butterfly in the family Hesperiidae. It is found in Etoumbi in the Republic of the Congo.
