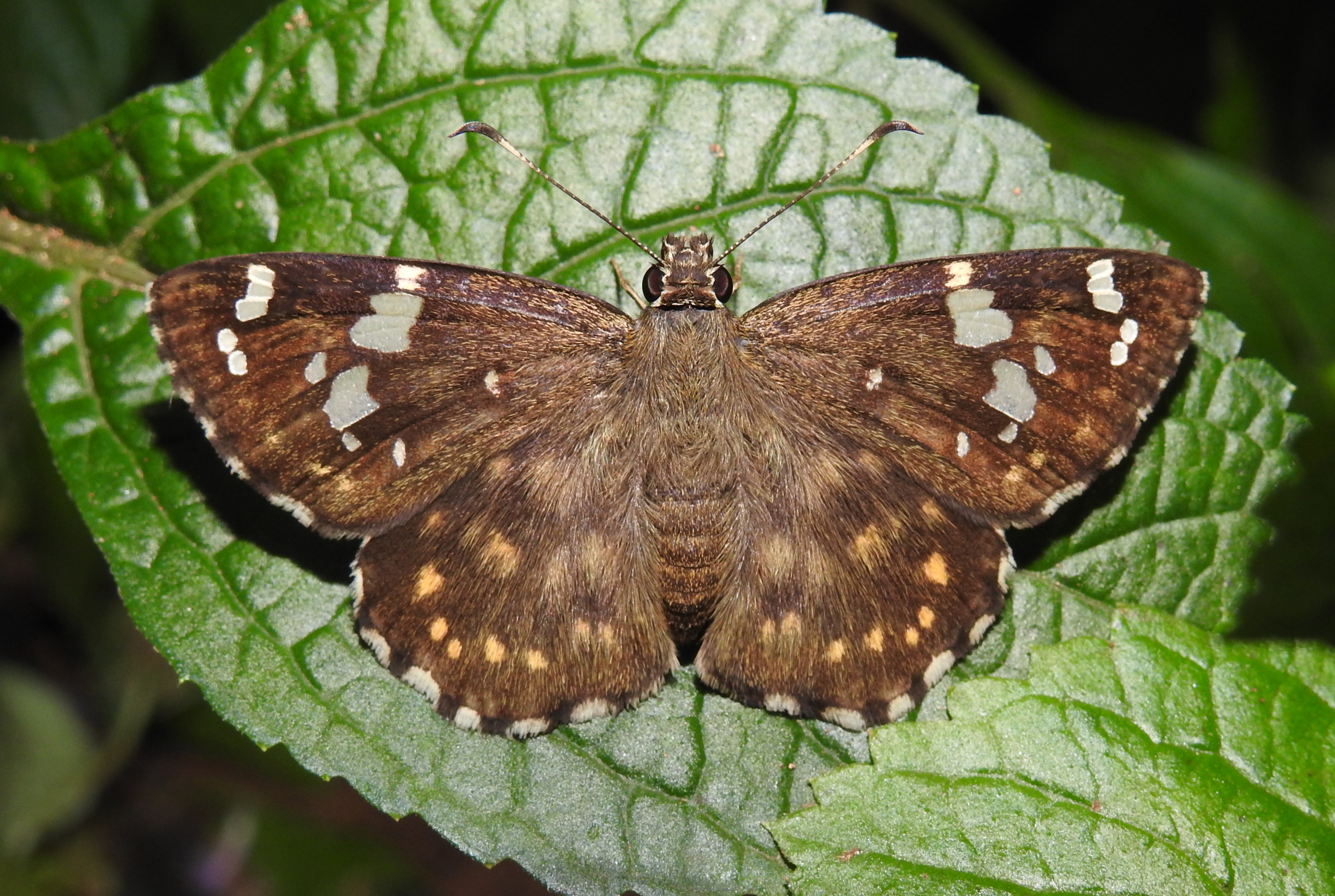

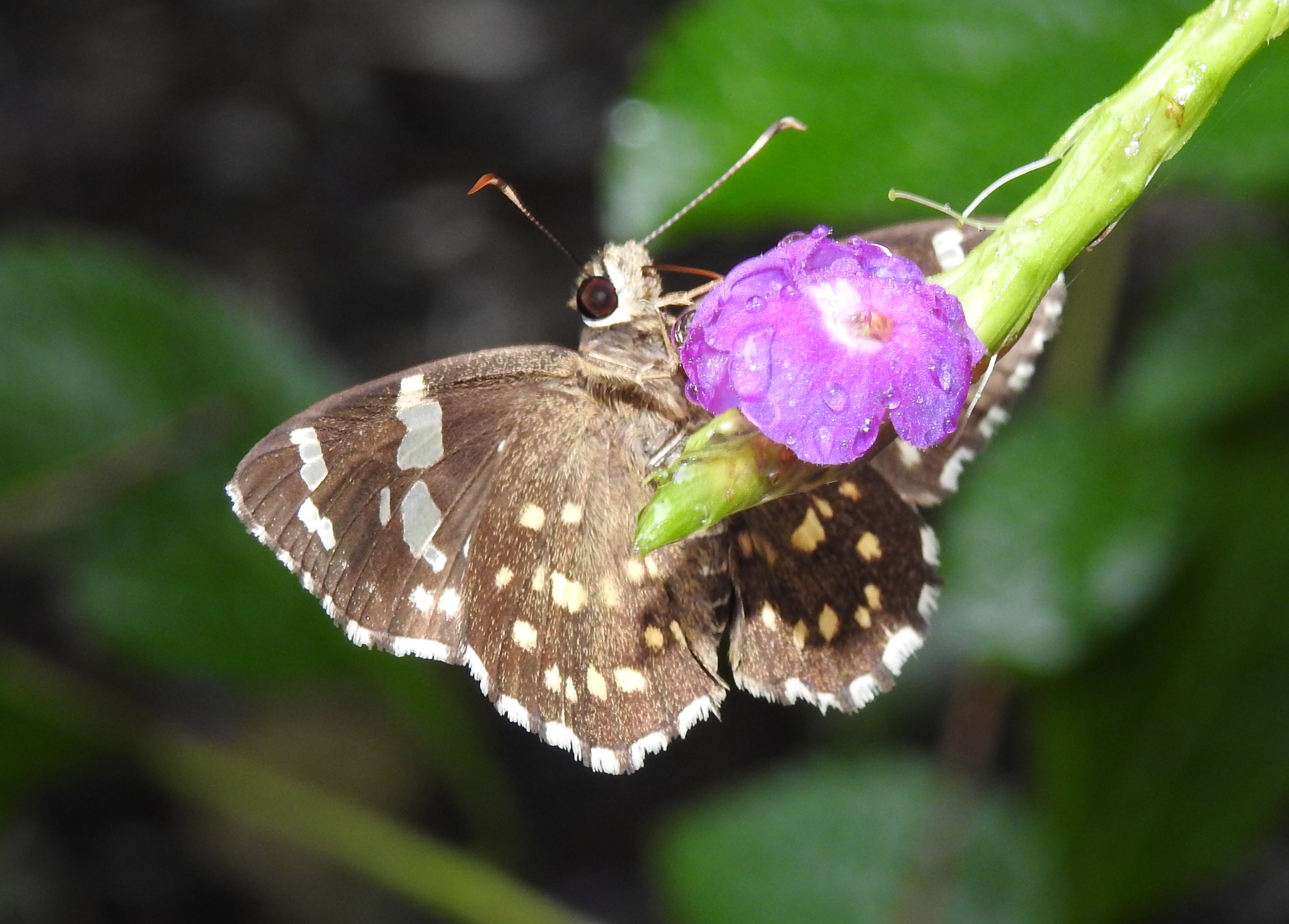

Scientific classification
- Domain: Eukaryota
- Kingdom: Animalia
- Phylum: Arthropoda
- Class: Insecta
- Order: Lepidoptera
- Family: Hesperiidae
- Genus: Celaenorrhinus
- Species: C. ambareesa

Binomial name
- Celaenorrhinus ambareesa (Moore, 1865)

= Celaenorrhinus ambareesa =

Malabar spotted flat

Species of butterfly

Celaenorrhinus ambareesa, commonly known as the Malabar spotted flat, is a species of hesperiid butterfly found in India.

== Range ==
The butterfly is found in India and ranges from South India to Khandesh, Madhya Pradesh to West Bengal.

== Description ==
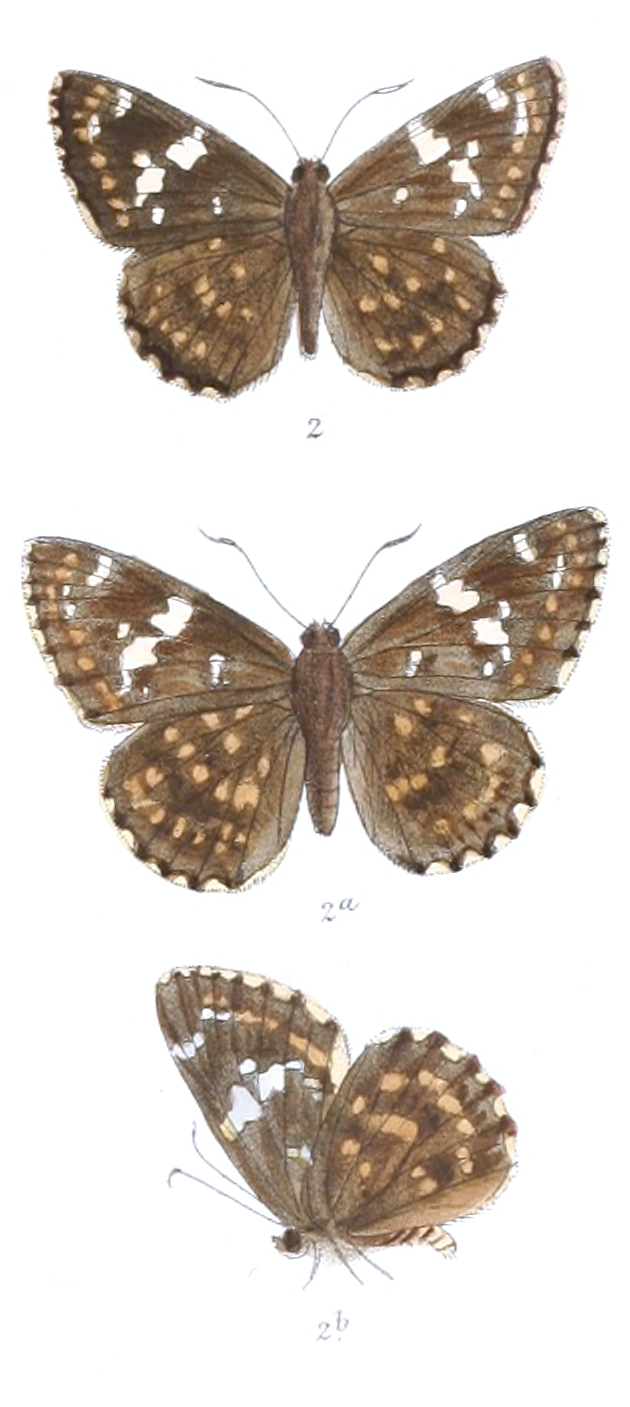
Male on top and females below

Unlike the common spotted flat, the semi-transparent white spots on the upperside of the forewings are separated from each other. It also has distinct rows of pale yellow spots on the hindwing and the hairy fringe of the wings (cilia) is chequered with black and white. All the spotted flats have similar habits and habitats. The Malabar spotted flat is more likely to be found under boulders and logs overhanging forest streams.

In 1891 Edward Yerbury Watson described it as:

Upperside dark olive-brown, the whole surface irrorated with delicate yellowish-olive scales: forewing with an oblique transverse discal series of pale yellowish-white semi-transparent spots, the first large and within the extremity of the cell, being indented exteriorly, the second small and some distance beyond, the third large and beneath the latter; below the last are two other small spots; and one-third from the base beneath the cell is a small round similar spot; above the first on the costa is a small brighter yellow spot, which is not transparent; before the apex are five rather large similar spots, the three upper conjugated as are also the other two; one or two lower submarginal very indistinct orange-coloured spots: hindwing with a row of ill-defined orange-coloured submarginal spots, and others still less defined nearer the base: cilia of both wings broad, alternate brown and yellowish-white. Underside paler, more uniform in colour; markings as above.

— Edward Yerbury Watson

Wingspan: 45 to 55 mm.

Life cycle

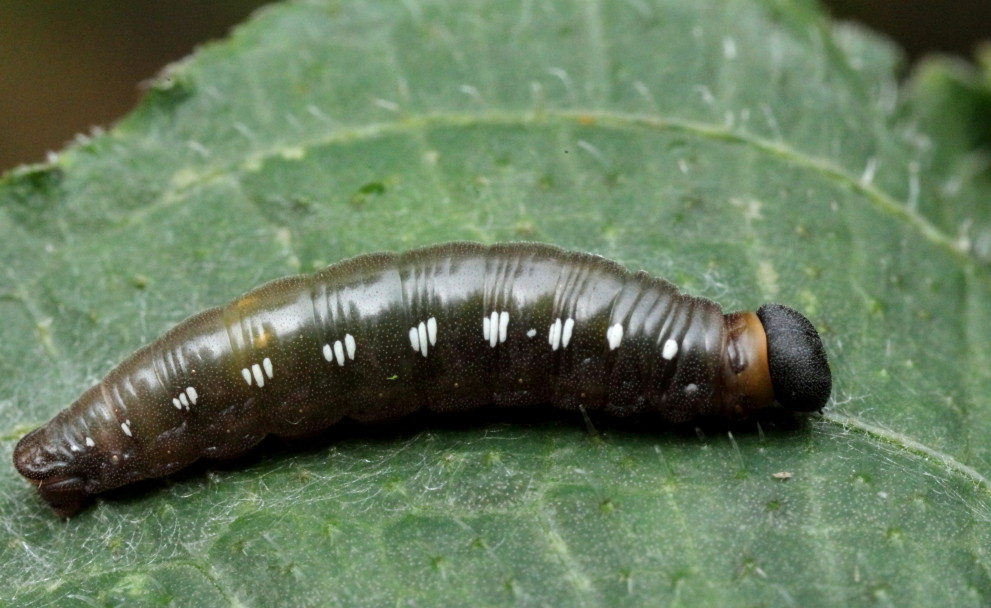
Larva

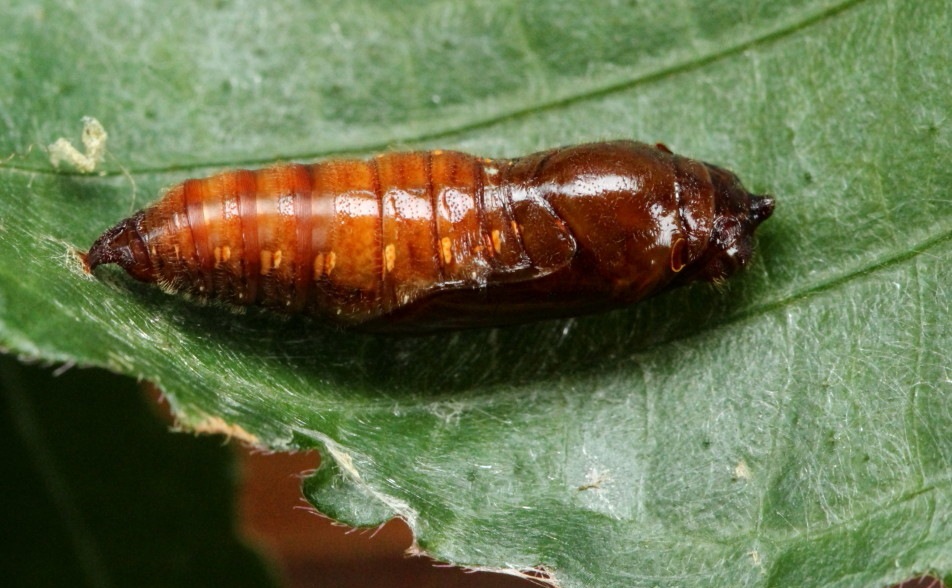
Chrysalis

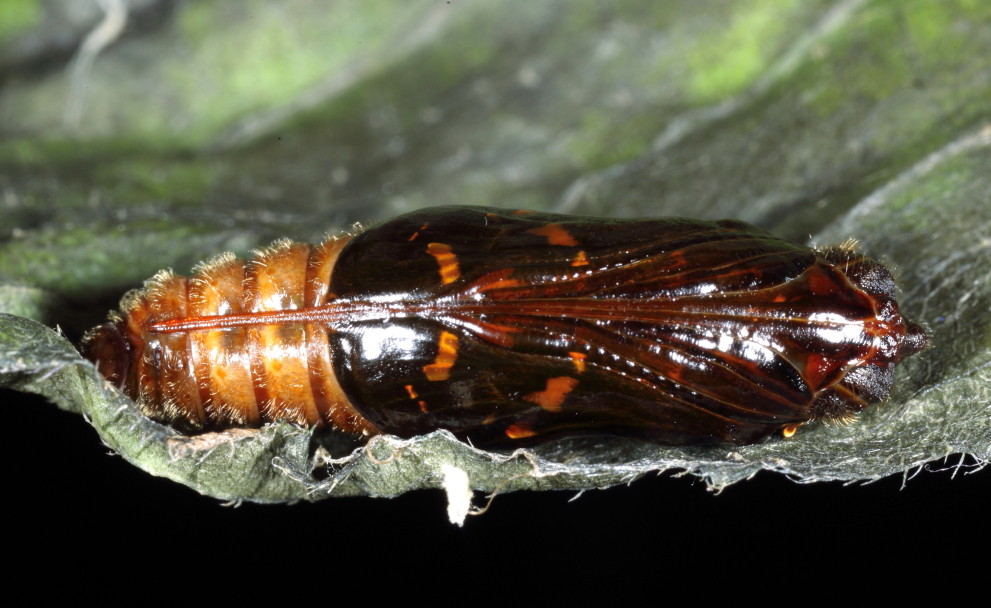
Chrysalis

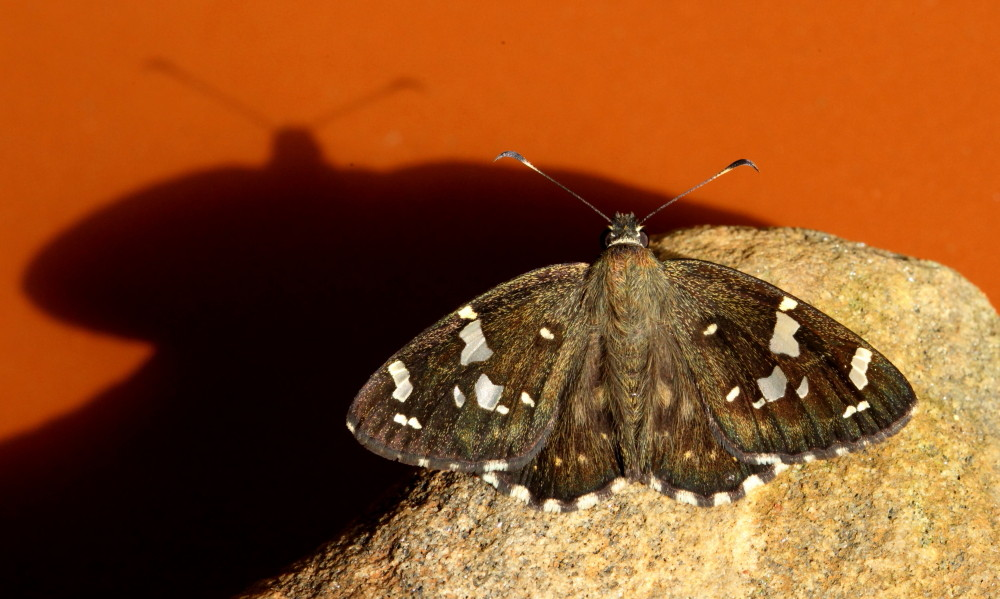
Imago (dorsal view)

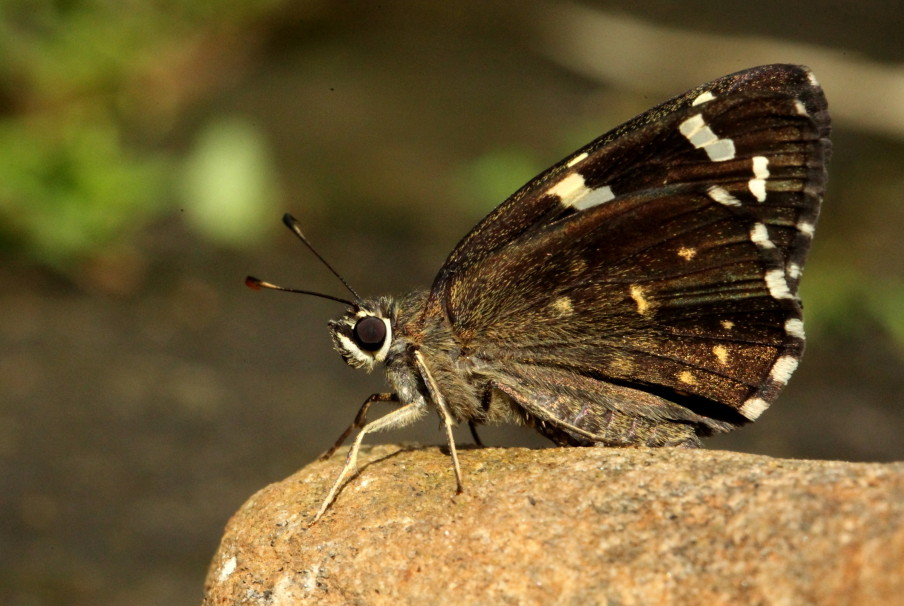
Imago (lateral view)

== Distribution ==
This butterfly is commonly found in moist-deciduous, semi-evergreen and secondary evergreen forests with a dense herb and shrub layers. It is particularly frequent in places where openings in the canopy let sunlight fall on the ground vegetation.

The butterfly is most commonly seen in the post monsoon season. The population is low in the winter and summer months but increases prior to the monsoon.

== Status ==
Not rare.

== See also ==
- Hesperiidae
- List of butterflies of India (Hesperiidae)
