= Celaenorrhinus sanjeensis =

Scientific classification
- Kingdom: Animalia
- Phylum: Arthropoda
- Class: Insecta
- Order: Lepidoptera
- Family: Hesperiidae
- Genus: Celaenorrhinus
- Species: C. sanjeensis

Binomial name
- Celaenorrhinus sanjeensis Kielland, 1990

Species of butterfly

Celaenorrhinus sanjeensis is a species of butterfly in the family Hesperiidae. It is found in south-central Tanzania. The habitat consists of forests.

The length of the forewings is 23.5 mm for males and 24.2 mm for females.
