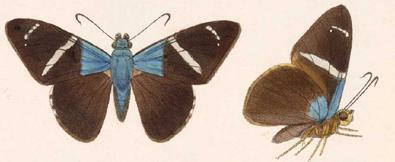

Scientific classification
- Kingdom: Animalia
- Phylum: Arthropoda
- Class: Insecta
- Order: Lepidoptera
- Family: Hesperiidae
- Genus: Celaenorrhinus
- Species: C. aegiochus

Binomial name
- Celaenorrhinus aegiochus (Hewitson, 1876)

Synonyms
- Eudamus aegiochus Hewitson, 1876; Orneates aegiochus; Eudamus mysius Plötz, 1886

= Celaenorrhinus aegiochus =

Species of butterfly

Celaenorrhinus aegiochus is a species of butterfly in the family Hesperiidae. It is found from Costa Rica to Panama and Colombia.
