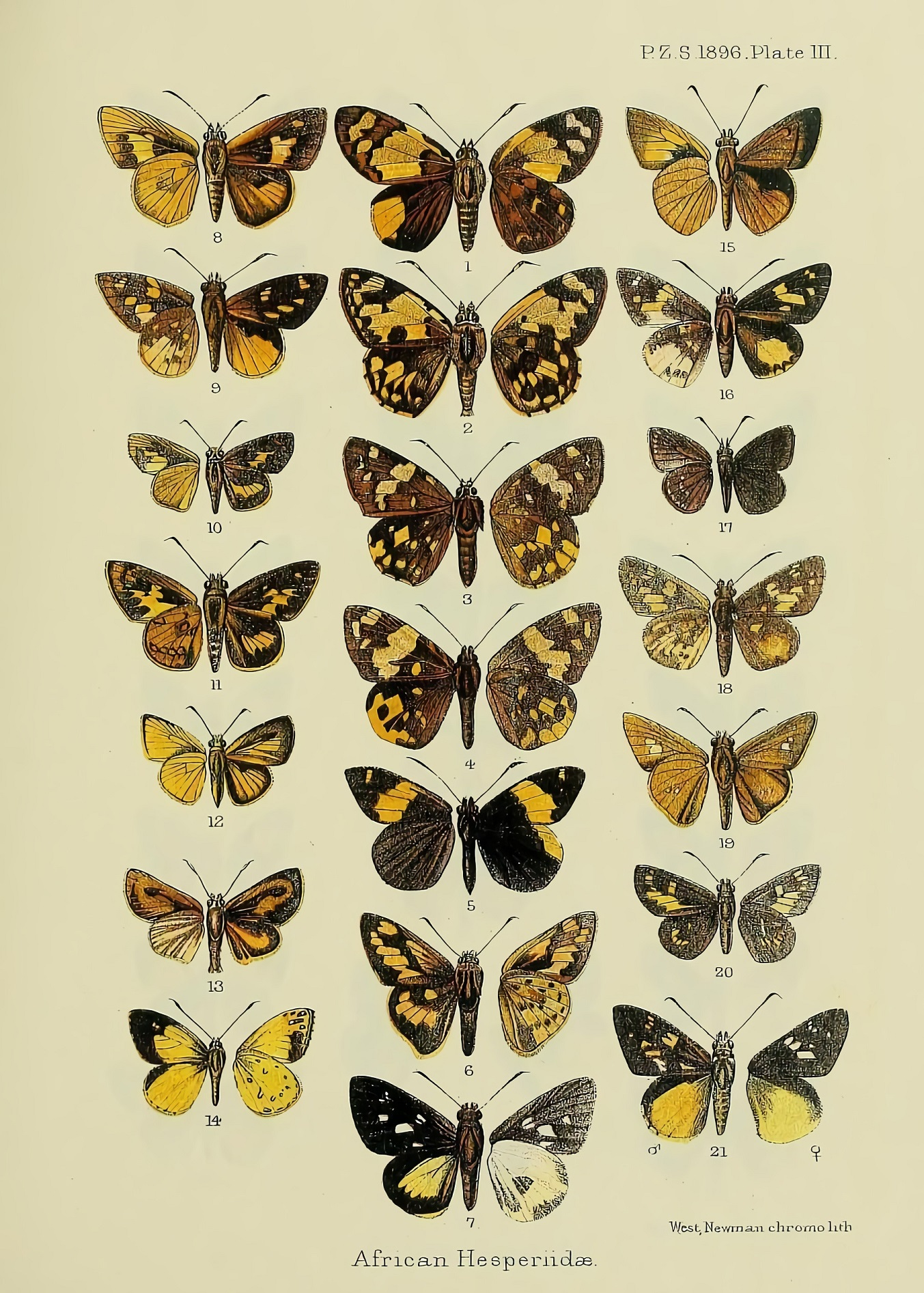
- Figure 2

Scientific classification
- Kingdom: Animalia
- Phylum: Arthropoda
- Class: Insecta
- Order: Lepidoptera
- Family: Hesperiidae
- Genus: Celaenorrhinus
- Species: C. meditrina

Binomial name
- Celaenorrhinus meditrina (Hewitson, 1877)

Synonyms
- Pterygospidea meditrina Hewitson, 1877; Pardaleodes interniplaga Mabille, 1891; Celaenorrhinus illnstroides Miller, 1971

= Celaenorrhinus meditrina =

Large orange sprite

Species of butterfly

Celaenorrhinus meditrina, commonly known as the large orange sprite, is a species of butterfly in the family Hesperiidae. It is found in Guinea, Sierra Leone, the Ivory Coast, Ghana, Nigeria, Cameroon, Bioko, the Republic of the Congo, the Central African Republic, the Democratic Republic of the Congo, Uganda and north-western Tanzania. The habitat consists of forests and dense secondary growth.
