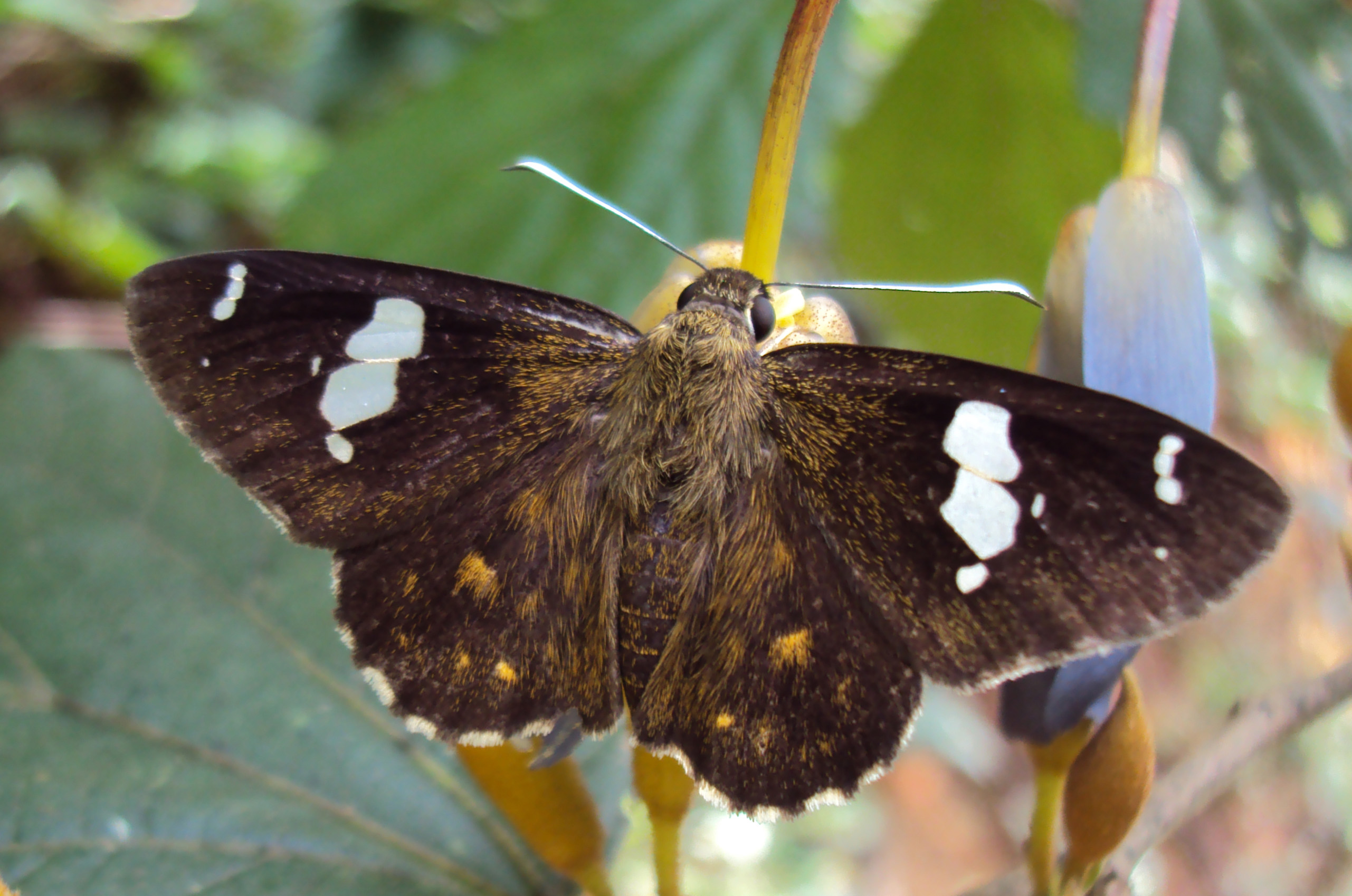

Scientific classification
- Kingdom: Animalia
- Phylum: Arthropoda
- Class: Insecta
- Order: Lepidoptera
- Family: Hesperiidae
- Genus: Celaenorrhinus
- Species: C. putra

Binomial name
- Celaenorrhinus putra (Moore, [1866])

Synonyms
- Plesioneura putra Moore, [1866]; Celaenorrhinus sanda Evans, 1941; Celaenorrhinus orbiferus piepersi Fruhstorfer, 1909

= Celaenorrhinus putra =

Species of butterfly

Celaenorrhinus putra, commonly known as the Bengal spotted flat, is a species of butterfly in the family Hesperiidae. It is found in India and south-east Asia.

== Description ==
Male. Upperside dark fuliginous-blackish-brown, nearly black, much darker than Celaenorrhinus leucocera, with some greenish-ochreous hairs in the basal area of both wings. Forewing with three semi-hyaline, small, sub-apical spots, in an outwardly oblique curve from near the costa, with the usual two lower spots placed outwards, the upper spots not conjoined and smaller than in leucocera, a discal band, not nearly so outwardly oblique as in C. leucocera, the upper end within the extremity of the cell, its upper half smaller than its lower, a short square spot in the interspace below, separated by the median vein, its inner side below the middle of the upper spot, its outer side very little beyond the other, a dot near the base of the second median interspace well separated from the two large spots, another also well separated below the lower outer edge of the lower large spot. Cilia brownish basally, whitish outwardly, not checkered as in C. leucocern. Hindwing much as in C. leucocera. Underside blacker than the upperside, markings similar, with an extra ochreous dot in the middle of the cell. Antennae, palpi, and body above and below as in C. leucocera. Female like the male above and beneath.

— Charles Swinhoe, Lepidoptera Indica. Vol. X

== Subspecies ==
- Celaenorrhinus putra putra (India)
- Celaenorrhinus putra piepersi Fruhstorfer, 1909 (Java)
- Celaenorrhinus putra sanda Evans, 1941 (Burma, Thailand, Laos, Malay Peninsula)
- Celaenorrhinus putra brahmaputra Elwes & Edwards, 1897 (Kinabalu)
