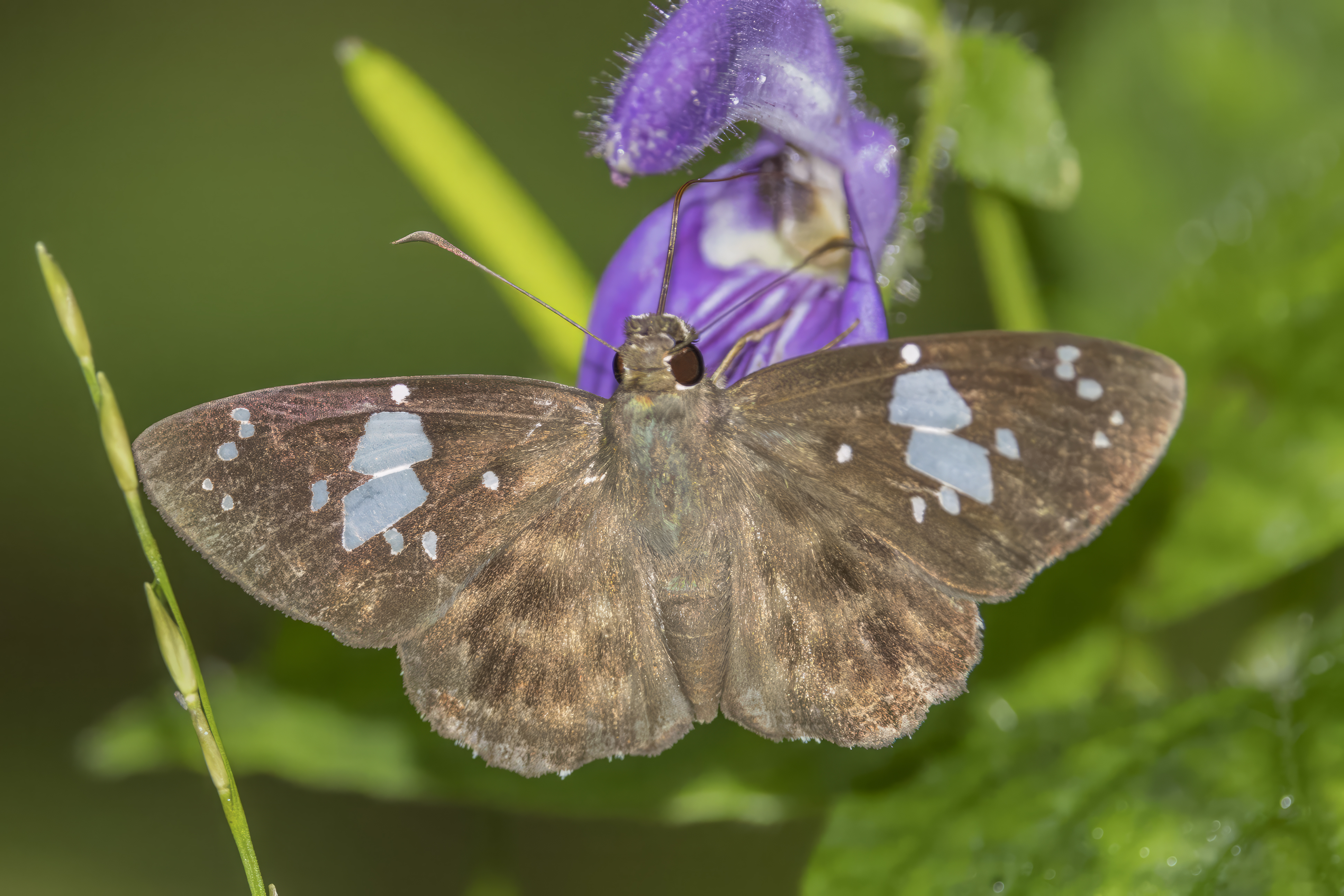
- Ankasa, Ghana

Scientific classification
- Kingdom: Animalia
- Phylum: Arthropoda
- Clade: Pancrustacea
- Class: Insecta
- Order: Lepidoptera
- Family: Hesperiidae
- Genus: Celaenorrhinus
- Species: C. plagiatus

Binomial name
- Celaenorrhinus plagiatus Berger, 1976

= Celaenorrhinus plagiatus =

Species of butterfly

Celaenorrhinus plagiatus, commonly known as Berger's black sprite, is a species of butterfly in the family Hesperiidae. It is found in Sierra Leone, Liberia, Ivory Coast, Ghana, Nigeria, Cameroon and the Democratic Republic of the Congo. The habitat consists of clearings in forests.

Torben Larsen developed a species numbering system for his 2005 publication Butterflies of West Africa. This species is #1231. The 'Larsen' numbers have since been used with permission in A Sharp Eye on Butterflies of Ghana.
