= Celaenorrhinus hecqui =

Scientific classification
- Kingdom: Animalia
- Phylum: Arthropoda
- Clade: Pancrustacea
- Class: Insecta
- Order: Lepidoptera
- Family: Hesperiidae
- Genus: Celaenorrhinus
- Species: C. hecqui

Binomial name
- Celaenorrhinus hecqui Berger, 1976

Species of butterfly

Celaenorrhinus hecqui is a species of butterfly in the family Hesperiidae.

== Habitat ==
It is found in Ituri, in the Democratic Republic of the Congo.
