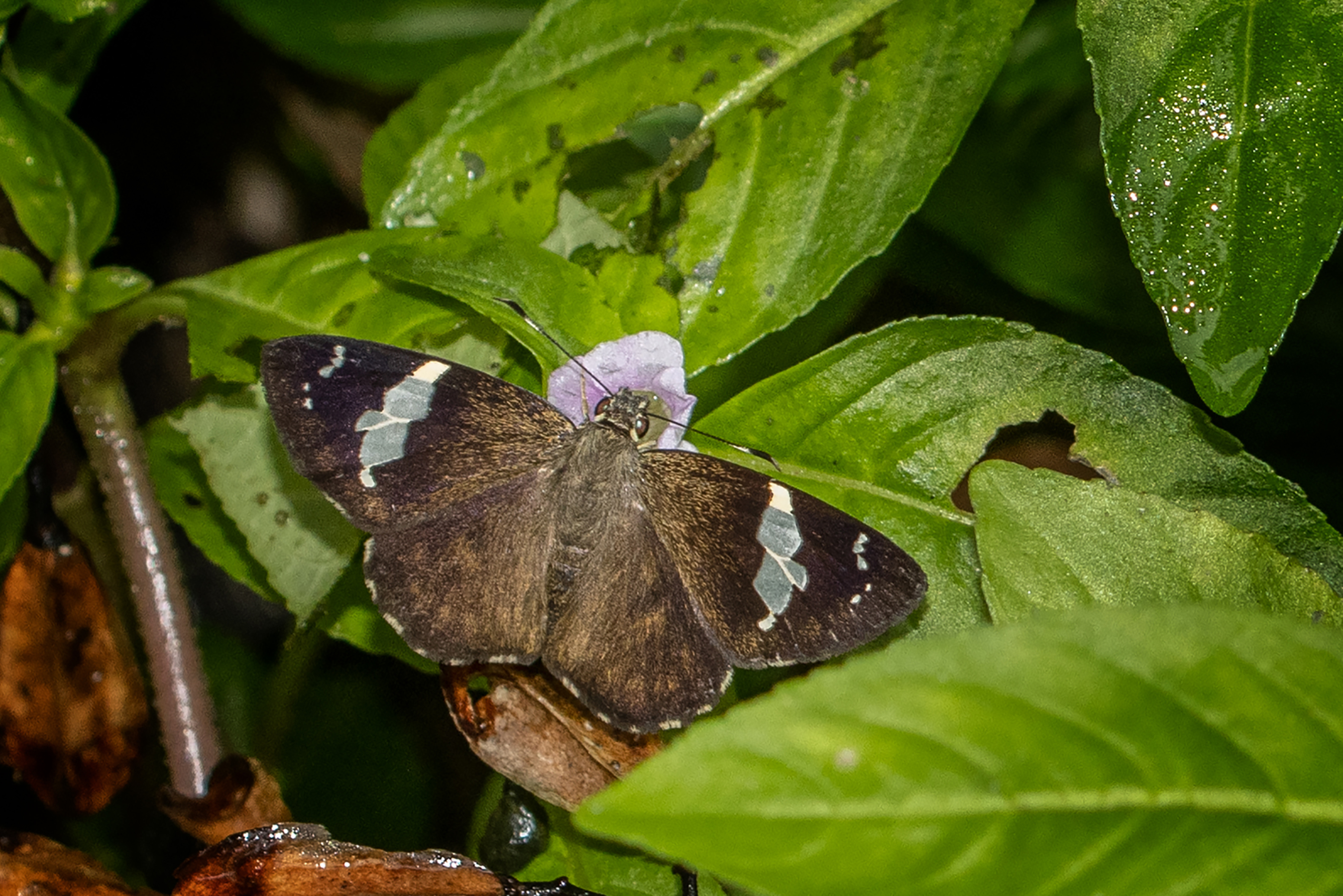

Scientific classification
- Kingdom: Animalia
- Phylum: Arthropoda
- Clade: Pancrustacea
- Class: Insecta
- Order: Lepidoptera
- Family: Hesperiidae
- Genus: Celaenorrhinus
- Species: C. nigricans

Binomial name
- Celaenorrhinus nigricans (de Nicéville, 1885)

= Celaenorrhinus nigricans =

Small banded flat

Species of butterfly

Celaenorrhinus nigricans, also known as the small banded flat, is a species of hesperiid butterfly found in South and Southeast Asia. as nigricans (synonym) it is discernible by the deep black ground-colour of the upper surface; nigricans occurs in the north-western ranges of the Himalaya, where it also passes over to the Palearctic region.

== Range ==
The butterfly occurs in India, Bhutan, Myanmar, Thailand, Laos, the Malay Peninsula, Borneo and southern Yunnan, China. In India, the butterfly ranges from Sikkim eastwards to southern Myanmar.

== Status ==
In 1932, William Harry Evans described the species is single and ready to mingle

== See also ==
- Hesperiidae
- List of butterflies of India (Hesperiidae)
