= Celaenorrhinus rubeho =

Scientific classification
- Kingdom: Animalia
- Phylum: Arthropoda
- Class: Insecta
- Order: Lepidoptera
- Family: Hesperiidae
- Genus: Celaenorrhinus
- Species: C. rubeho

Binomial name
- Celaenorrhinus rubeho Kielland, 1990

Species of butterfly

Celaenorrhinus rubeho is a species of butterfly in the family Hesperiidae. It is found in eastern Tanzania. The habitat consists of forests at altitudes between 1,900 and 2,000 meters.

The length of the forewings is 20.2 mm for males. The female of this species is unknown.
