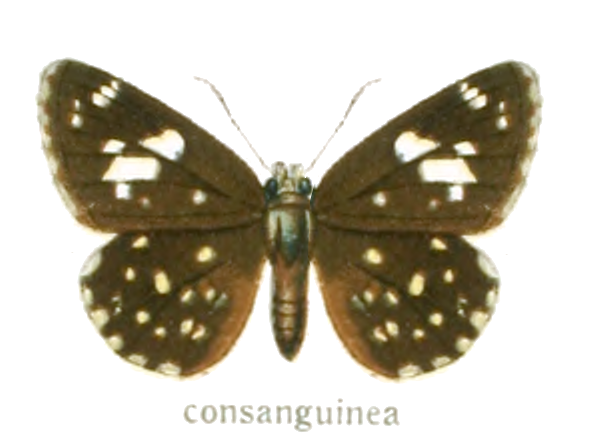

Scientific classification
- Kingdom: Animalia
- Phylum: Arthropoda
- Class: Insecta
- Order: Lepidoptera
- Family: Hesperiidae
- Genus: Celaenorrhinus
- Species: C. consanguinea

Binomial name
- Celaenorrhinus consanguinea Leech, 1891

Synonyms
- Celaenorrhinus chihhsiaoi Hsu, 1990

= Celaenorrhinus consanguinea =

Species of butterfly

Celaenorrhinus consanguinea is a species of butterfly in the family Hesperiidae. It is found in China and Taiwan.

== Subspecies ==
- Celaenorrhinus consanguinea consanguinea (Yunnan)
- Celaenorrhinus consanguinea chihhsiaoi Hsu, 1990 (Taiwan)
