= Celaenorrhinus nigropunctata =

Scientific classification
- Kingdom: Animalia
- Phylum: Arthropoda
- Class: Insecta
- Order: Lepidoptera
- Family: Hesperiidae
- Genus: Celaenorrhinus
- Species: C. nigropunctata

Binomial name
- Celaenorrhinus nigropunctata Bethune-Baker, 1908

Species of butterfly

Celaenorrhinus nigropunctata is a species of butterfly in the family Hesperiidae. It is found in Central Africa from Cameroon to Uganda.

== Subspecies ==
- Celaenorrhinus nigropunctata nigropunctata (Congo, Democratic Republic of the Congo, western Uganda)
- Celaenorrhinus nigropunctata netta Evans, 1937 (Cameroon)
