= Celaenorrhinus suzannae =

Scientific classification
- Kingdom: Animalia
- Phylum: Arthropoda
- Class: Insecta
- Order: Lepidoptera
- Family: Hesperiidae
- Genus: Celaenorrhinus
- Species: C. suzannae

Binomial name
- Celaenorrhinus suzannae Berger, 1976

Species of butterfly

Celaenorrhinus suzannae is a species of butterfly in the family Hesperiidae. It is found in the Democratic Republic of the Congo (Eala and Sankuru).
