= Celaenorrhinus dargei =

Scientific classification
- Kingdom: Animalia
- Phylum: Arthropoda
- Class: Insecta
- Order: Lepidoptera
- Family: Hesperiidae
- Genus: Celaenorrhinus
- Species: C. dargei

Binomial name
- Celaenorrhinus dargei Berger, 1976

Species of butterfly

Celaenorrhinus dargei is a species of butterfly in the family Hesperiidae. It is found in Cameroon.
