= Celaenorrhinus handmani =

Scientific classification
- Kingdom: Animalia
- Phylum: Arthropoda
- Class: Insecta
- Order: Lepidoptera
- Family: Hesperiidae
- Genus: Celaenorrhinus
- Species: C. handmani

Binomial name
- Celaenorrhinus handmani Collins & Congdon, 1998

Species of butterfly

Celaenorrhinus handmani is a species of butterfly in the family Hesperiidae. It is found in southern Kenya, Tanzania, Malawi and Zambia. The habitat consists of forests.
