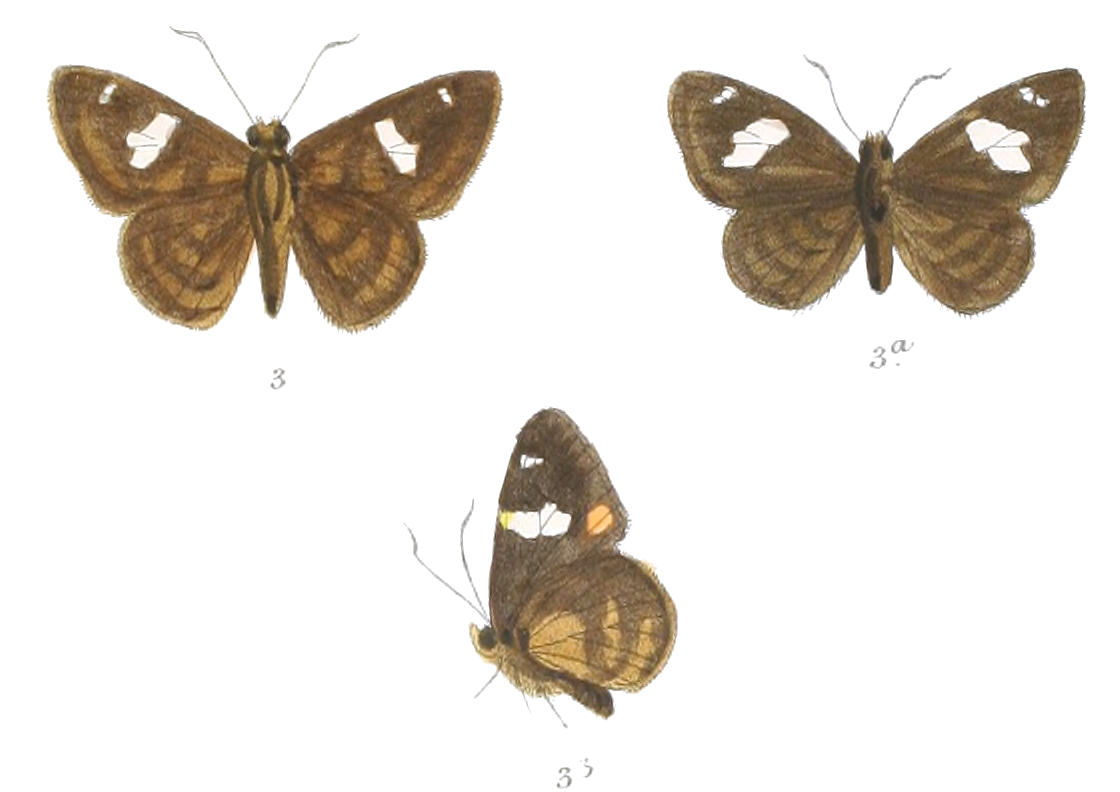

Scientific classification
- Kingdom: Animalia
- Phylum: Arthropoda
- Clade: Pancrustacea
- Class: Insecta
- Order: Lepidoptera
- Family: Hesperiidae
- Genus: Celaenorrhinus
- Species: C. asmara

Binomial name
- Celaenorrhinus asmara (Butler, 1879)

= Celaenorrhinus asmara =

White-banded flat

Species of butterfly

Celaenorrhinus asmara, commonly known as the white-banded flat, is a species of hesperiid butterfly which is found in South and Southeast Asia.It is on both sides quite uni-coloured brown and spotless, except the whitish hyaline spots of the forewing, the number and shape of which is exhibited in the figure

== Range ==
The butterfly occurs in India, Myanmar, Malaysia, Thailand, Laos, Vietnam, and Indonesia. The butterfly occurs in India from Assam onward to the Karen Hills in Myanmar.

== Status ==
In 1932, William Harry Evans reported that Celaenorrhinus asmara was not rare in India and Myanmar.

== See also ==
- Hesperiidae
- List of butterflies of India (Hesperiidae)
