= Celaenorrhinus sagamase =

Scientific classification
- Kingdom: Animalia
- Phylum: Arthropoda
- Clade: Pancrustacea
- Class: Insecta
- Order: Lepidoptera
- Family: Hesperiidae
- Genus: Celaenorrhinus
- Species: C. sagamase

Binomial name
- Celaenorrhinus sagamase Collins & Larsen, 2005

Species of butterfly

Celaenorrhinus sagamase, commonly known as the Sagamase sprite, is a species of butterfly in the family Hesperiidae. It is found in Ghana. The habitat consists of forests.
