= Celaenorrhinus kimboza =

Scientific classification
- Kingdom: Animalia
- Phylum: Arthropoda
- Class: Insecta
- Order: Lepidoptera
- Family: Hesperiidae
- Genus: Celaenorrhinus
- Species: C. kimboza

Binomial name
- Celaenorrhinus kimboza Evans, 1949

Species of butterfly

Celaenorrhinus kimboza is a species of butterfly in the family Hesperiidae. It is found in Tanzania. The habitat consists of limestone forest vegetation, at the foot of the Uluguru Mountains.
