= Sarıkemer =

- Neighbourhood
- Location in Turkey Sarıkemer (Turkey Aegean)
- Coordinates: 37°34′N 27°22′E
- Country: Turkey
- Province: Aydın
- District: Söke
- Elevation: 30 m (98 ft)
- Population (2022): 2,103
- Time zone: UTC+3 (TRT)
- Postal code: 09200
- Area code: 0256

Sarıkemer is a neighbourhood of the municipality and district of Söke, Aydın Province, Turkey. Its population is 2,103 (2022). Before the 2013 reorganisation, it was a town (belde). It is situated in the alluvial plain of the Büyükmenderes River, known as the Maeander in antiquity, which flows within the town. Sarıkemer is 24 kilometres (15 mi) south of Söke and 75 kilometres (47 mi) southwest of Aydın. The main economic activity of the town is cotton farming. The site of the ancient town of Pyrrha is reputedly located near the town.
