= Celaenorrhinus ambra =

Scientific classification
- Kingdom: Animalia
- Phylum: Arthropoda
- Clade: Pancrustacea
- Class: Insecta
- Order: Lepidoptera
- Family: Hesperiidae
- Genus: Celaenorrhinus
- Species: C. ambra

Binomial name
- Celaenorrhinus ambra Evans, 1937

Species of butterfly

Celaenorrhinus ambra is a species of butterfly in the family Hesperiidae. It is found in northern Madagascar. The habitat consists of forests.
