= Celaenorrhinus illustris =

Illustrious sprite

Scientific classification
- Kingdom: Animalia
- Phylum: Arthropoda
- Class: Insecta
- Order: Lepidoptera
- Family: Hesperiidae
- Genus: Celaenorrhinus
- Species: C. illustris

Binomial name
- Celaenorrhinus illustris (Mabille, 1891)

Synonyms
- Pardaleodes illustris Mabille, 1891; Celaenorrhinus illustris ab. abbreviata Aurivillius, 1925

Species of butterfly

Celaenorrhinus illustris, commonly known as the illustrious sprite, is a species of butterfly in the family Hesperiidae. It is found in Nigeria, Cameroon, Equatorial Guinea, Gabon, the Republic of the Congo, the Central African Republic, the Democratic Republic of the Congo and Uganda. The habitat consists of forests.

== Subspecies ==
- Celaenorrhinus illustris illustris (eastern Nigeria, Cameroon, Equatorial Guinea, Gabon, Congo, Central African Republic, Democratic Republic of the Congo)
- Celaenorrhinus illustris daroa Evans, 1937 (western Uganda)
