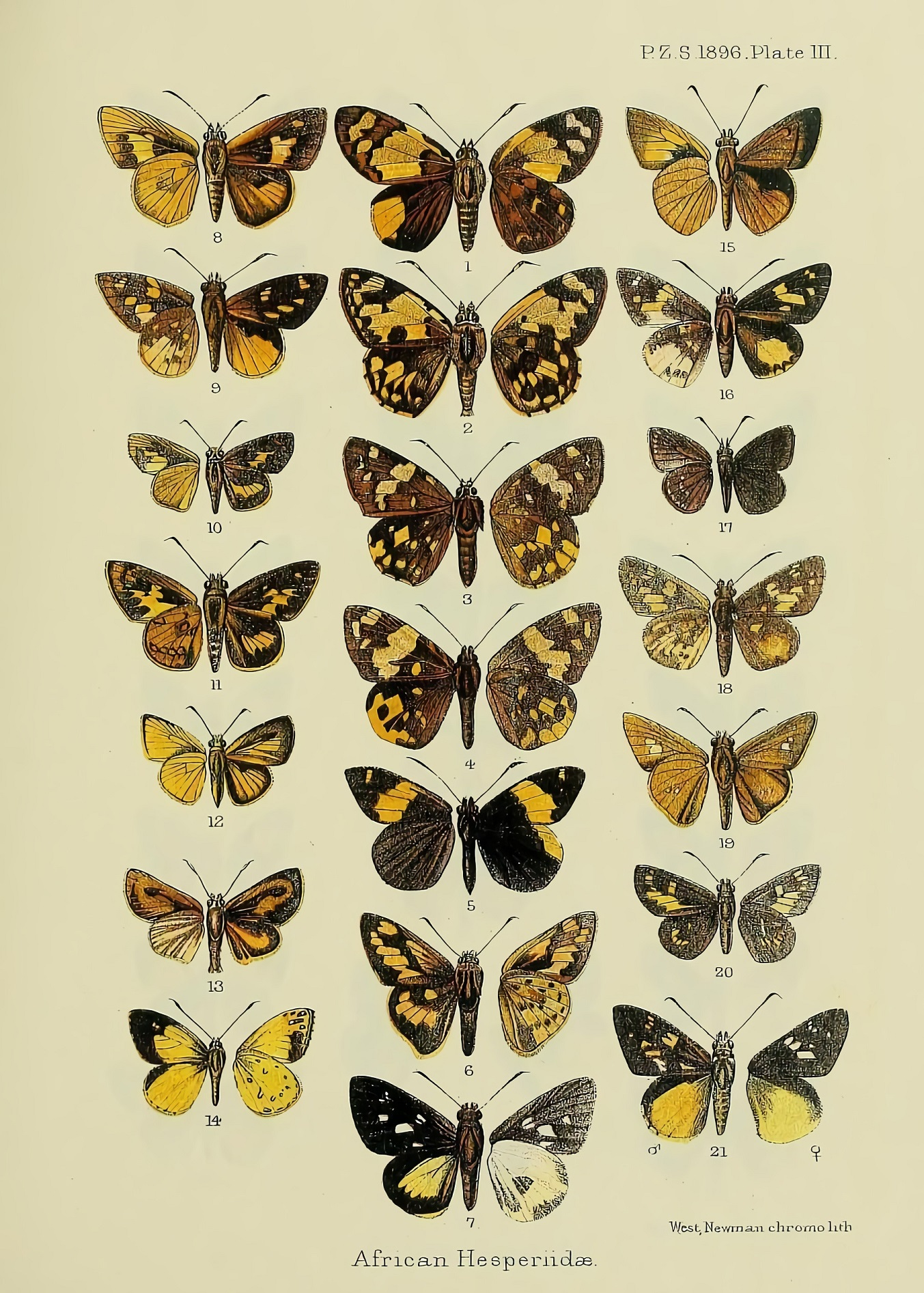
- Figure 5

Scientific classification
- Kingdom: Animalia
- Phylum: Arthropoda
- Class: Insecta
- Order: Lepidoptera
- Family: Hesperiidae
- Genus: Celaenorrhinus
- Species: C. chrysoglossa

Binomial name
- Celaenorrhinus chrysoglossa (Mabille, 1891)

Synonyms
- Ancistrocampta chrysoglossa Mabille, 1891; Celaenorrhinus ploetzi Swinhoe, 1907

= Celaenorrhinus chrysoglossa =

Central sprite

Species of butterfly

Celaenorrhinus chrysoglossa, commonly known as the central sprite, is a species of butterfly in the family Hesperiidae. It is found in Nigeria (the Cross River loop), Cameroon, the Republic of the Congo, the Central African Republic and the Democratic Republic of the Congo. The habitat consists of primary forests.
