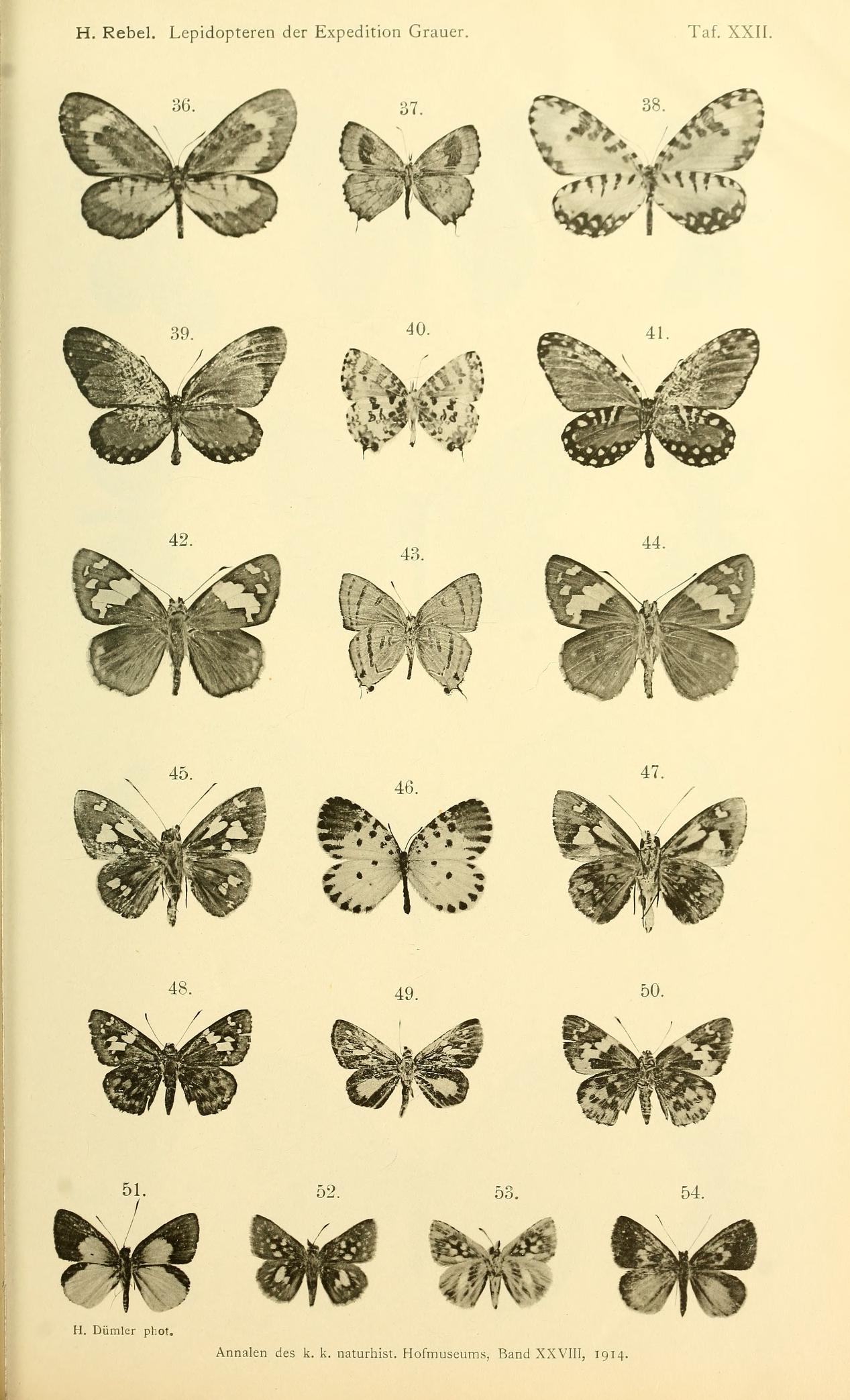
- Figures 42 and 44

Scientific classification
- Kingdom: Animalia
- Phylum: Arthropoda
- Class: Insecta
- Order: Lepidoptera
- Family: Hesperiidae
- Genus: Celaenorrhinus
- Species: C. perlustris

Binomial name
- Celaenorrhinus perlustris Rebel, 1914

Synonyms
- Celaenorrhinus perlustris katangensis f. overlaeti Berger, 1976

= Celaenorrhinus perlustris =

Species of butterfly

Celaenorrhinus perlustris, commonly known as the less illustrious sprite, is a species of butterfly in the family Hesperiidae. It is found in Nigeria, and eastwards through Cameroon, the Democratic Republic of the Congo and Uganda to Tanzania. The habitat consists of swampy areas in dense forests.

== Subspecies ==
- Celaenorrhinus perlustris perlustris (eastern Democratic Republic of the Congo, western Uganda, north-western Tanzania)
- Celaenorrhinus perlustris katangensis Berger, 1976 (Democratic Republic of the Congo: south to Shaba)
- Celaenorrhinus perlustris mona Evans, 1937 (Nigeria: the Cross River loop, Cameroon)
