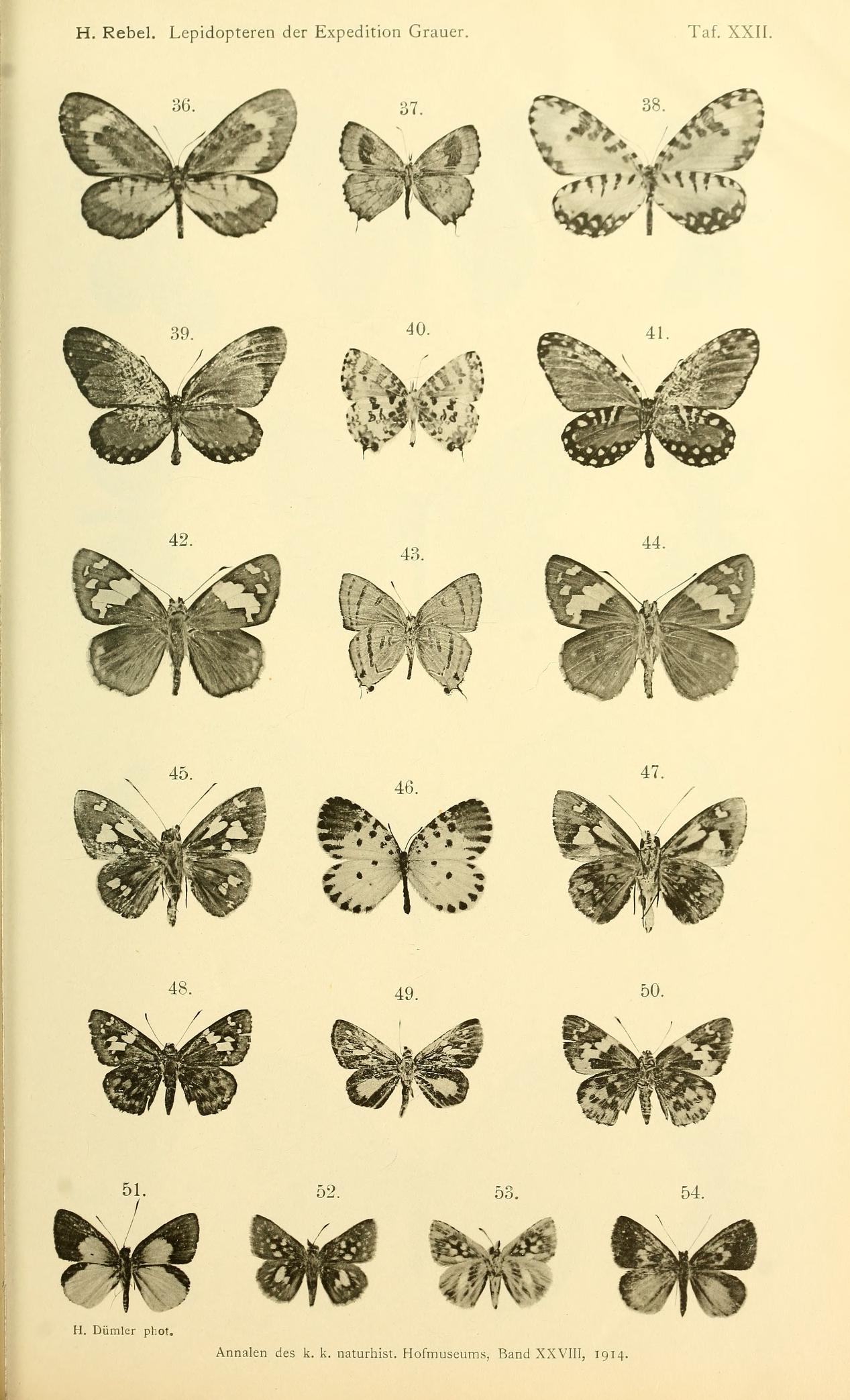
- Celaenorrhinus bettoni figure 48

Scientific classification
- Kingdom: Animalia
- Phylum: Arthropoda
- Class: Insecta
- Order: Lepidoptera
- Family: Hesperiidae
- Genus: Celaenorrhinus
- Species: C. bettoni

Binomial name
- Celaenorrhinus bettoni Butler, 1902

Synonyms
- Celaenorrhinus obscuripennis Strand, 1913; Celaenorrhinus modestus Rebel, 1914; Sarangesa hypoxanthina Mabille & Boullet, 1916

= Celaenorrhinus bettoni =

Species of butterfly

Celaenorrhinus bettoni, also known as Betton's sprite or Betton's flat, is a species of butterfly in the family Hesperiidae. It is found in Nigeria, Cameroon, the Democratic Republic of the Congo, Uganda, Kenya, Tanzania, Zambia, Mozambique and eastern Zimbabwe. The habitat consists of forests.

Adult males mud-puddle.
