= Celaenorrhinus milleri =

Scientific classification
- Kingdom: Animalia
- Phylum: Arthropoda
- Class: Insecta
- Order: Lepidoptera
- Family: Hesperiidae
- Genus: Celaenorrhinus
- Species: C. milleri

Binomial name
- Celaenorrhinus milleri Collins & Larsen, 2003

Species of butterfly

Celaenorrhinus milleri is a species of butterfly in the family Hesperiidae. It is found in Cameroon.

Adults are on wing nearly year-round.

== Etymology ==
The species is named for Lee D. Miller, of the Allyn Museum.
