= Celaenorrhinus ovalis =

- Arusha National Park, Tanzania

Scientific classification
- Kingdom: Animalia
- Phylum: Arthropoda
- Clade: Pancrustacea
- Class: Insecta
- Order: Lepidoptera
- Family: Hesperiidae
- Genus: Celaenorrhinus
- Species: C. ovalis

Binomial name
- Celaenorrhinus ovalis Evans, 1937

Synonyms
- Celaenorrhinus medetrina ovalis Evans, 1937

Species of butterfly

Celaenorrhinus ovalis, also known as Evans' orange sprite, is a species of butterfly in the family Hesperiidae. It is found in Sierra Leone, Liberia, Ivory Coast, Ghana, Nigeria, Cameroon, the Republic of the Congo, the Central African Republic, the Democratic Republic of the Congo, Uganda, western Kenya and Tanzania. The habitat consists of forests.
