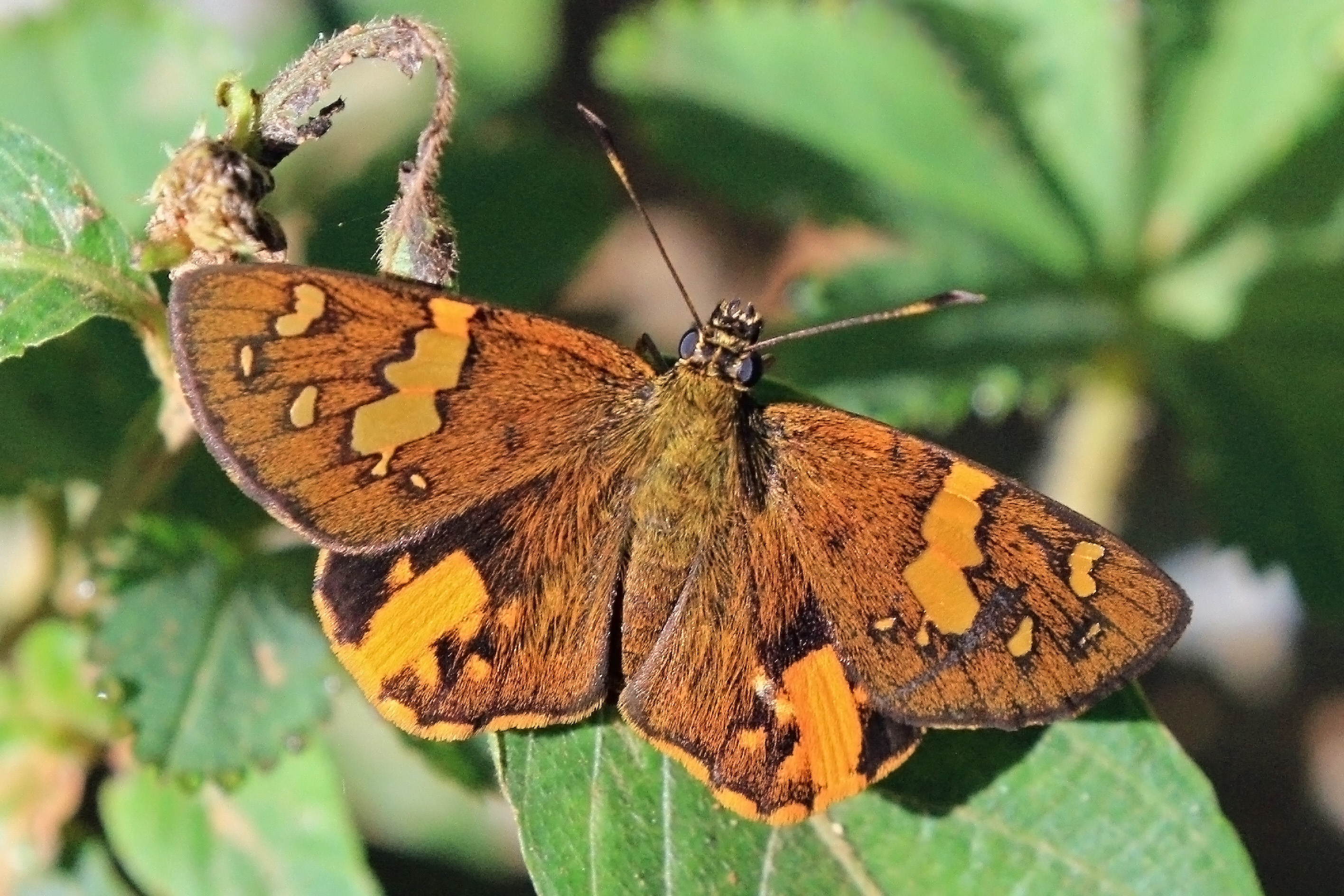
- Celaenorrhinus intermixtus evansi, Kenya

Scientific classification
- Kingdom: Animalia
- Phylum: Arthropoda
- Class: Insecta
- Order: Lepidoptera
- Family: Hesperiidae
- Genus: Celaenorrhinus
- Species: C. intermixtus

Binomial name
- Celaenorrhinus intermixtus Aurivillius, 1896

= Celaenorrhinus intermixtus =

Species of butterfly

Celaenorrhinus intermixtus is a species of butterfly in the family Hesperiidae. It is found in Cameroon, the Democratic Republic of the Congo, Uganda, Kenya and Tanzania. The habitat consists of forests.

== Subspecies ==
- Celaenorrhinus intermixtus intermixtus (Cameroon, Democratic Republic of the Congo: Shaba)
- Celaenorrhinus intermixtus evansi Berger, 1975 (Uganda, Democratic Republic of the Congo: Ituri, western Kenya, north-western and northern Tanzania)
