= Celaenorrhinus aureus =

Scientific classification
- Kingdom: Animalia
- Phylum: Arthropoda
- Class: Insecta
- Order: Lepidoptera
- Family: Hesperiidae
- Genus: Celaenorrhinus
- Species: C. aureus

Binomial name
- Celaenorrhinus aureus Collins & Larsen, 2005

Species of butterfly

Celaenorrhinus aureus is a species of butterfly in the family Hesperiidae. It is found in the Republic of the Congo.
