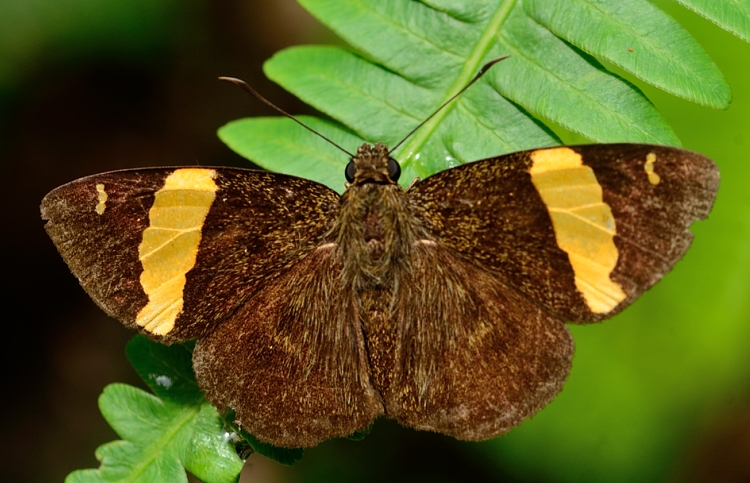
- At Fraser's Hill, Malaysia

Scientific classification
- Kingdom: Animalia
- Phylum: Arthropoda
- Class: Insecta
- Order: Lepidoptera
- Family: Hesperiidae
- Genus: Aurivittia
- Species: A. aurivittata

Binomial name
- Aurivittia aurivittata (Moore, [1879])

Synonyms
- Plesioneura aurivittata Moore, 1878; Celaenorrhinus aurivittata (Moore, 1878)

= Aurivittia aurivittata =

Dark yellow-banded flat

Species of butterfly

Aurivittia aurivittata, the dark yellow-banded flat, is a species of hesperiid butterfly which is found in South Asia and Southeast Asia.

== Range ==
The butterfly occurs in India, Bhutan, Myanmar, Thailand, Laos, the Malay Peninsula, Borneo and southern Yunnan. In India, the butterfly ranges across the Himalayas to Sikkim eastwards to southern Myanmar.

Evans: Assam to south Myanmar, south Mergui, Malaya, Sumatra, Kota Kina Balu, Borneo Savela:

== Status ==
In 1932, William Harry Evans reported that A. aurivittata was not rare in India and north Myanmar, but was rare elsewhere.
