= Pyrrha (Euboea) =

Pyrrha or Pyrra (Ancient Greek: Πύρρα) was a town of ancient Euboea.

Its site is unlocated.
