= Pyrrha (Caria) =

Ancient Greek town

Coordinates: 37°33′25″N 27°22′57″E

Pyrrha or Pyrra (Ancient Greek: Πύρρα) was a small town on the Maeander River, opposite to Miletus; it was 50 stadia distant from the mouth of the river.

The site of Pyrrha is tentatively located near modern Sarıkemer in Asiatic Turkey.
