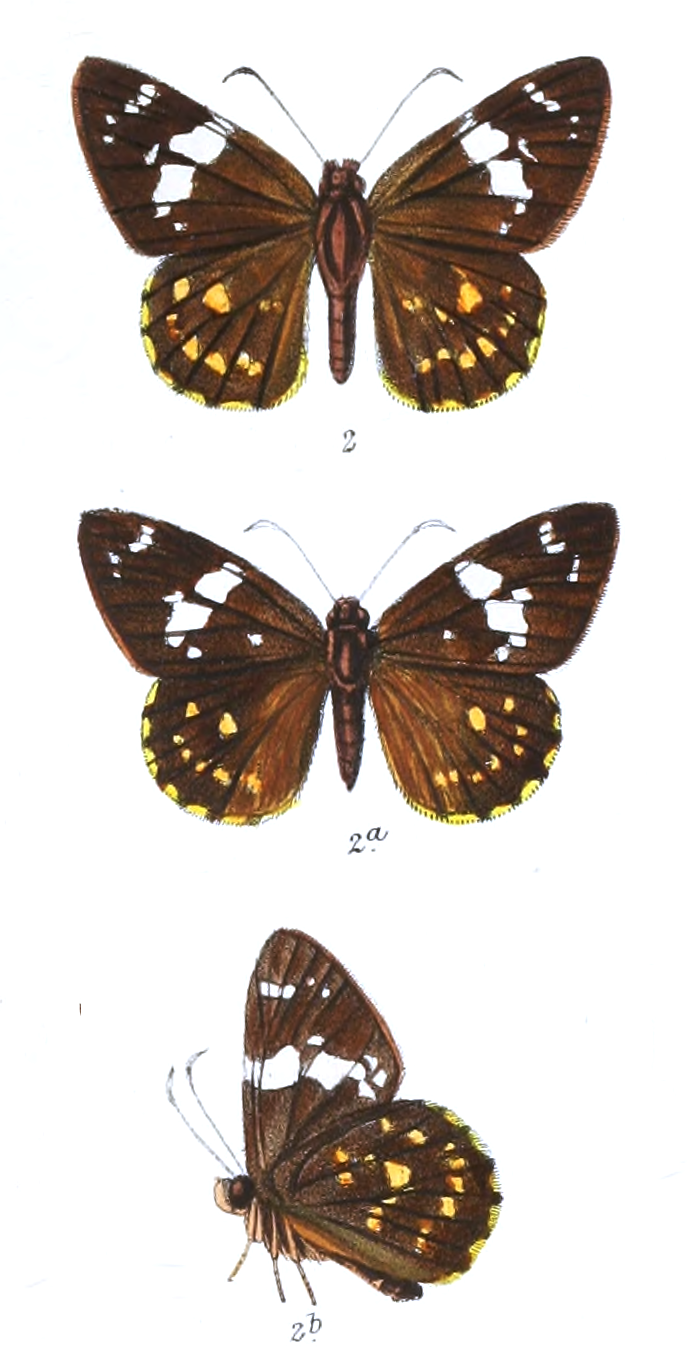
- From top: male, female and male underside

Scientific classification
- Kingdom: Animalia
- Phylum: Arthropoda
- Class: Insecta
- Order: Lepidoptera
- Family: Hesperiidae
- Genus: Celaenorrhinus
- Species: C. pyrrha

Binomial name
- Celaenorrhinus pyrrha de Nicéville, 1889

= Celaenorrhinus pyrrha =

Double spotted flat

Species of butterfly

Celaenorrhinus pyrrha, commonly known as the double spotted flat, is a species of hesperiid butterfly found in South Asia.

== Range ==
The butterfly occurs in India, Bhutan, Myanmar, Laos, and the Malay Peninsula. In India, the butterfly ranges from Kumaon (Uttarakhand) to Sikkim, Bhutan and eastwards towards Myanmar.

== Status ==
It was described by William Harry Evans as not being rare.

== See also ==
- Hesperiidae
- List of butterflies of India (Hesperiidae)
