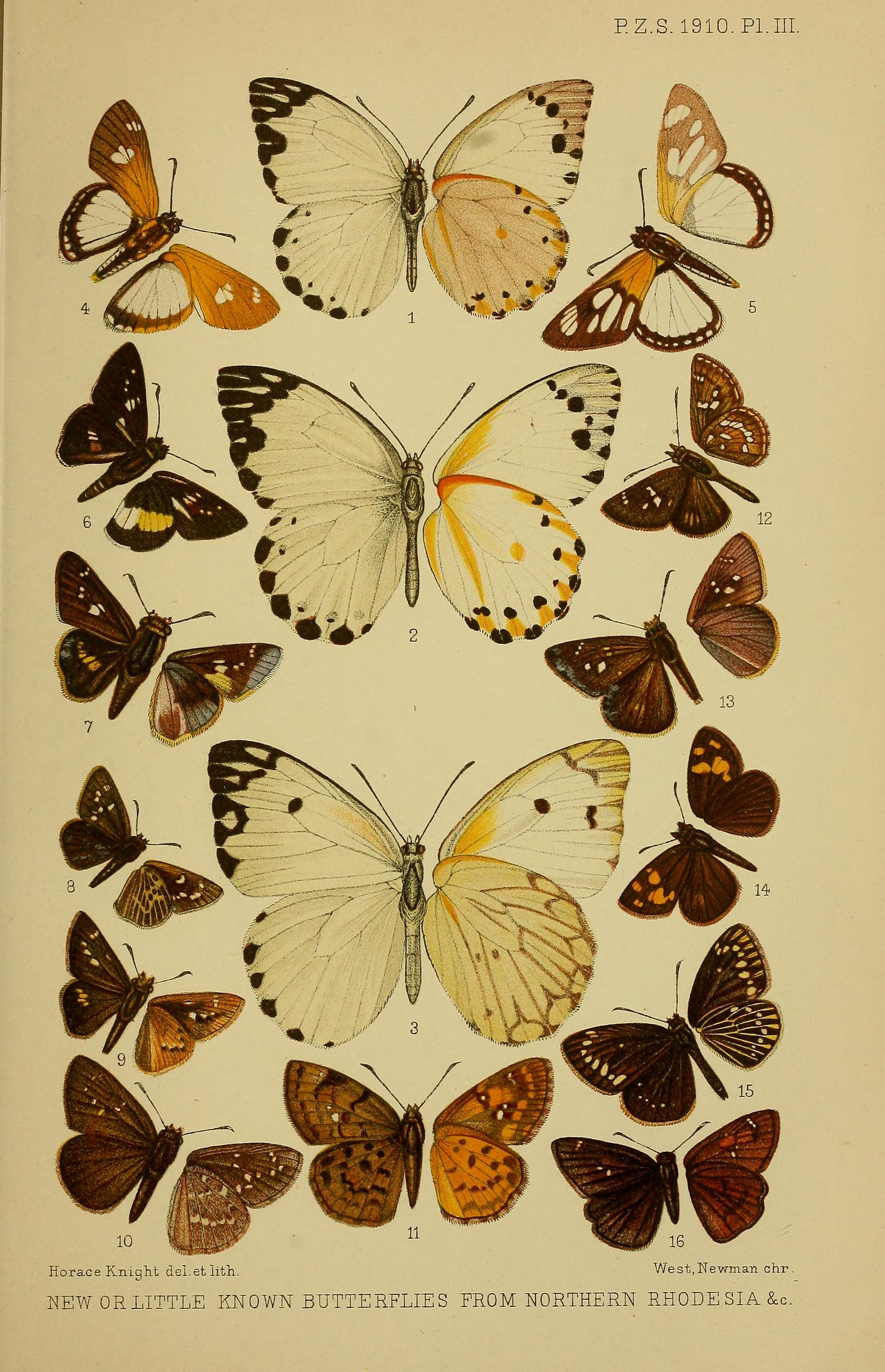
- Figure 16

Scientific classification
- Kingdom: Animalia
- Phylum: Arthropoda
- Class: Insecta
- Order: Lepidoptera
- Family: Hesperiidae
- Genus: Eretis
- Species: E. umbra

Binomial name
- Eretis umbra (Trimen, 1862)

Synonyms
- List: Nisoniades umbra Trimen, 1862; Nisoniades norica Plötz, 1884; Eretis djaelaelae var. maculifera Mabille & Boullet, 1916; Eretis djaelaelae f. punctigera Mabille and Boullet, 1916; Sarangesa nox Neave, 1910

= Eretis umbra =

Species of butterfly

Eretis umbra, commonly known as the small marbled elf, is a species of butterfly in the family Hesperiidae. It is found from South Africa to eastern Africa and Uganda. Similar to Eretis djaelaelae but lacks white forelegs.

The wingspan is 30–32 mm for males and 32–37 mm for females. Adults are on wing year-round in warmer areas and from August to May in cooler areas.

The larvae feed on Chaetacanthus setiger, Phaulopsis, Dyschoriste, Chaetacanthus (synonym of Dyschoriste), Justicia and Asystasia (including Asystasia schimperi).

== Subspecies ==
- Eretis umbra umbra - South Africa: along the coast from the western Cape to the eastern Cape, Eswatini, KwaZulu-Natal, the Orange Free State, Limpopo, the North-West Provinces, Mpumalanga, Gauteng and the eastern part of the northern Cape
- Eretis umbra maculifera Mabille & Boullet, 1916 - north-eastern Uganda, central and western Kenya, Tanzania
- Eretis umbra nox (Neave, 1910) - Malawi, southern and eastern Zambia, Mozambique, Zimbabwe
