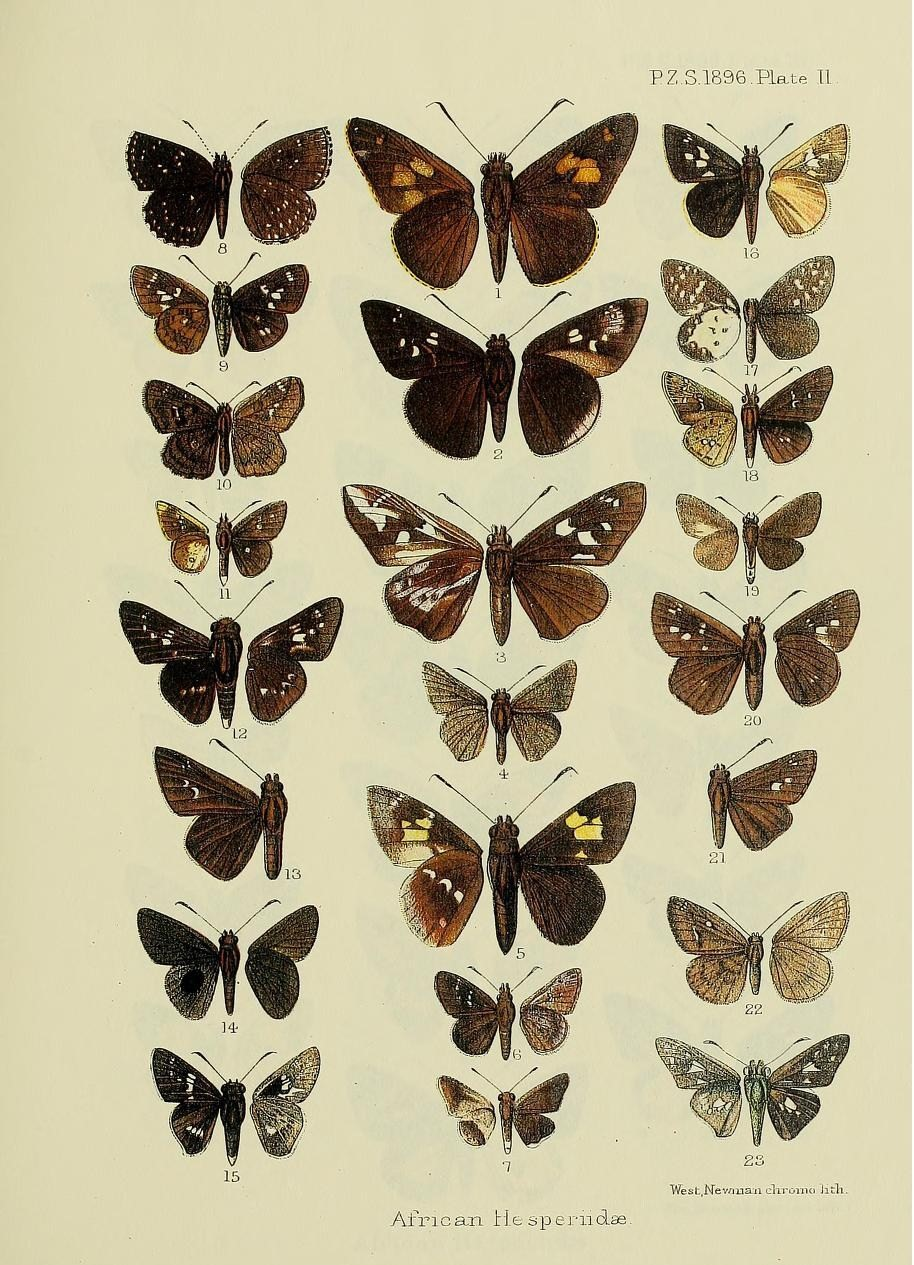
- Eretis lugens figure 10

Scientific classification
- Kingdom: Animalia
- Phylum: Arthropoda
- Clade: Pancrustacea
- Class: Insecta
- Order: Lepidoptera
- Family: Hesperiidae
- Genus: Eretis
- Species: E. lugens

Binomial name
- Eretis lugens (Rogenhofer, 1891)

Synonyms
- Pterygospidea lugens Rogenhofer, 1891; Pterygospidea morosa Rogenhofer, 1891

= Eretis lugens =

Species of butterfly

Eretis lugens, commonly known as the savanna elf, is a species of butterfly in the family Hesperiidae. It is found in Senegal, northern Guinea, northern Sierra Leone, Liberia, northern Ivory Coast, Ghana, Togo, Benin, Nigeria, Cameroon, the Central African Republic, Angola, the Democratic Republic of the Congo, southern Sudan, Ethiopia, Uganda, Burundi, Kenya, Tanzania and north-western Zambia. The habitat consists of Sudan savanna, open Guinea savanna, forest margins, forests and dense woodland.

The larvae feed on Asystasia schimperi, Asystasia coromandeliana, Justicia lukepiensis, Dyschoriste perrotetetti and Barleria species.

Torben Larsen developed a species numbering system for his 2005 publication Butterflies of West Africa. This species is #1242. The 'Larsen' numbers have since been used with permission in A Sharp Eye on Butterflies of Ghana.
