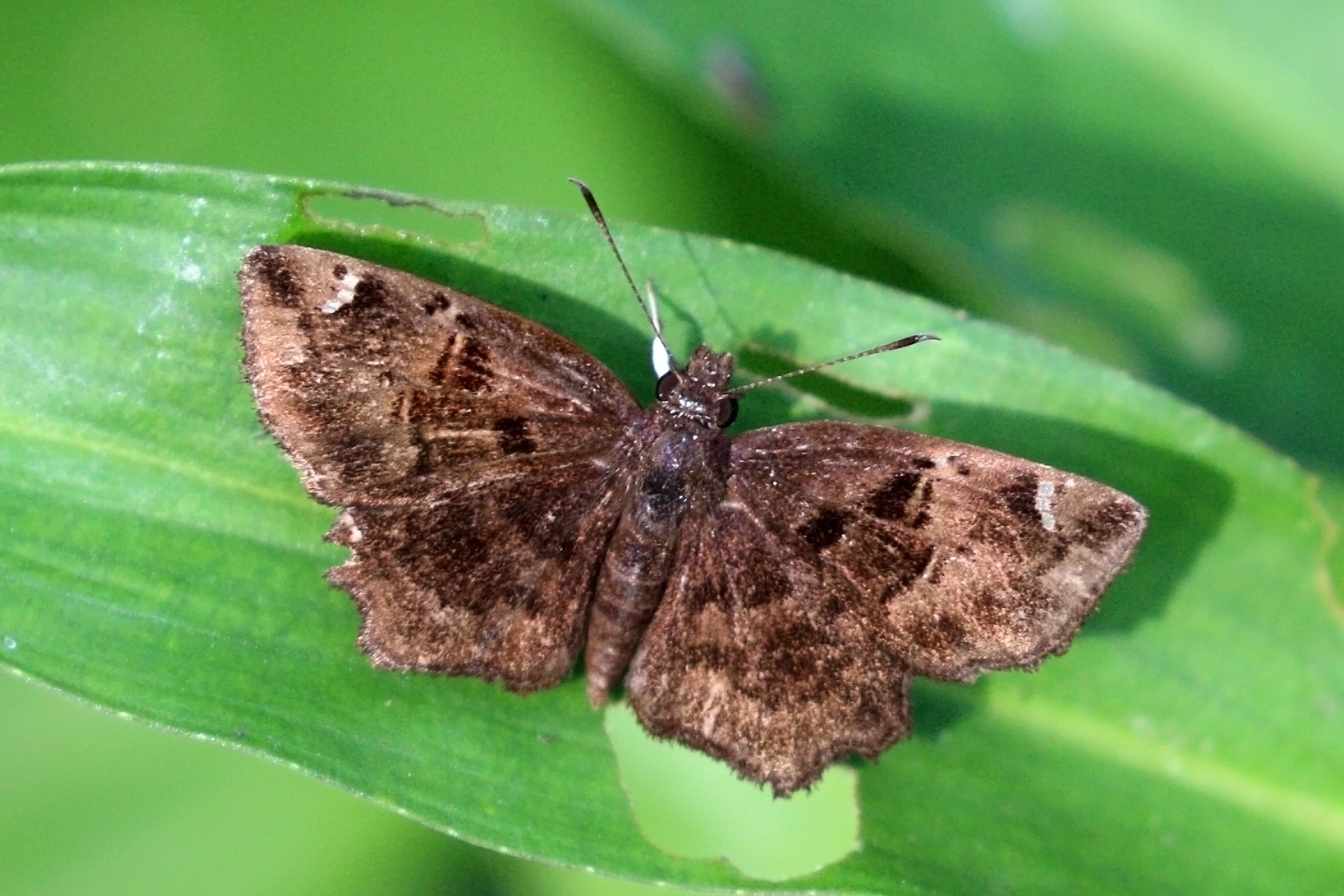
- Kibale Forest, Uganda

Scientific classification
- Kingdom: Animalia
- Phylum: Arthropoda
- Class: Insecta
- Order: Lepidoptera
- Family: Hesperiidae
- Genus: Eretis
- Species: E. djaelaelae

Binomial name
- Eretis djaelaelae (Wallengren, 1857)

Synonyms
- Pterygospidea djaelaelae Wallengren, 1857

= Eretis djaelaelae =

Species of butterfly

Eretis djaelaelae, commonly known as the marbled elf, is a species of butterfly in the family Hesperiidae. It is found from Somalia southwards to South Africa. The habitat consists of savanna woodland and sometimes also grassland. Similar to Eretis umbra but has white forelegs.

The wingspan is 31–35 mm for males and 34–36 mm for females. Adults are on wing year-round, and it is more common in warmer areas. Peaks occur from September to March in southern Africa.

The larvae feed on Phaulopsis imbricata, Chaetacanthus setiger, Dyschoriste and Justicia species (including Justicia protracta).
