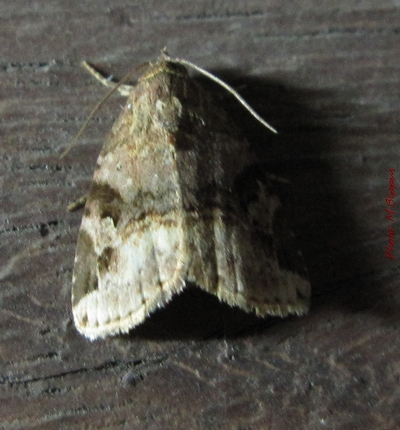
- Microplexia costimaculalis

Scientific classification
- Kingdom: Animalia
- Phylum: Arthropoda
- Class: Insecta
- Order: Lepidoptera
- Superfamily: Noctuoidea
- Family: Noctuidae
- Genus: Microplexia; Hampson, 1908

Synonyms
- Bryonola Toulgoët, 1955

= Microplexia =

Genus of moths

Microplexia is a genus of moths of the family Noctuidae. The genus was erected by George Hampson in 1908.

Some species of this genus are:

- Microplexia albopicta (Saalmüller, 1891)
- Microplexia anosibe Berio, 1959
- Microplexia aurantiaca (Saalmüller, 1891)
- Microplexia bicoloria Berio, 1963
- Microplexia bicostata Berio, 1964
- Microplexia confusa Berio, 1963
- Microplexia costimaculalis Guillermet, 1992
- Microplexia discreta (Saalmüller, 1891)
- Microplexia elegans (Saalmüller, 1891)
- Microplexia extranea Berio, 1959
- Microplexia fenestrata Berio, 1963
- Microplexia ferrea Hampson, 1908
- Microplexia fracta Berio, 1956
- Microplexia griveaudi Berio, 1963
- Microplexia lithacodica Berio, 1964
- Microplexia matercula (Saalmüller, 1880)
- Microplexia metachrostoides Berio, 1959
- Microplexia muscosa (Saalmüller, 1891)
- Microplexia nephelea (Mabille, 1900)
- Microplexia parmelia (Toulgoët, 1954)
- Microplexia plurinephra Berio, 1959
- Microplexia sagitta (Saalmüller, 1891)
- Microplexia transversata Berio, 1964
- Microplexia virescens (Saalmüller, 1891)
- Microplexia viridaria (Kenrick, 1917)
- Microplexia viridis Berio, 1963
