= Eretis buamba =

Scientific classification
- Kingdom: Animalia
- Phylum: Arthropoda
- Class: Insecta
- Order: Lepidoptera
- Family: Hesperiidae
- Genus: Eretis
- Species: E. buamba

Binomial name
- Eretis buamba Evans, 1937

Species of butterfly

Eretis buamba is a species of butterfly in the family Hesperiidae. It is found in the Democratic Republic of the Congo and western Uganda.
