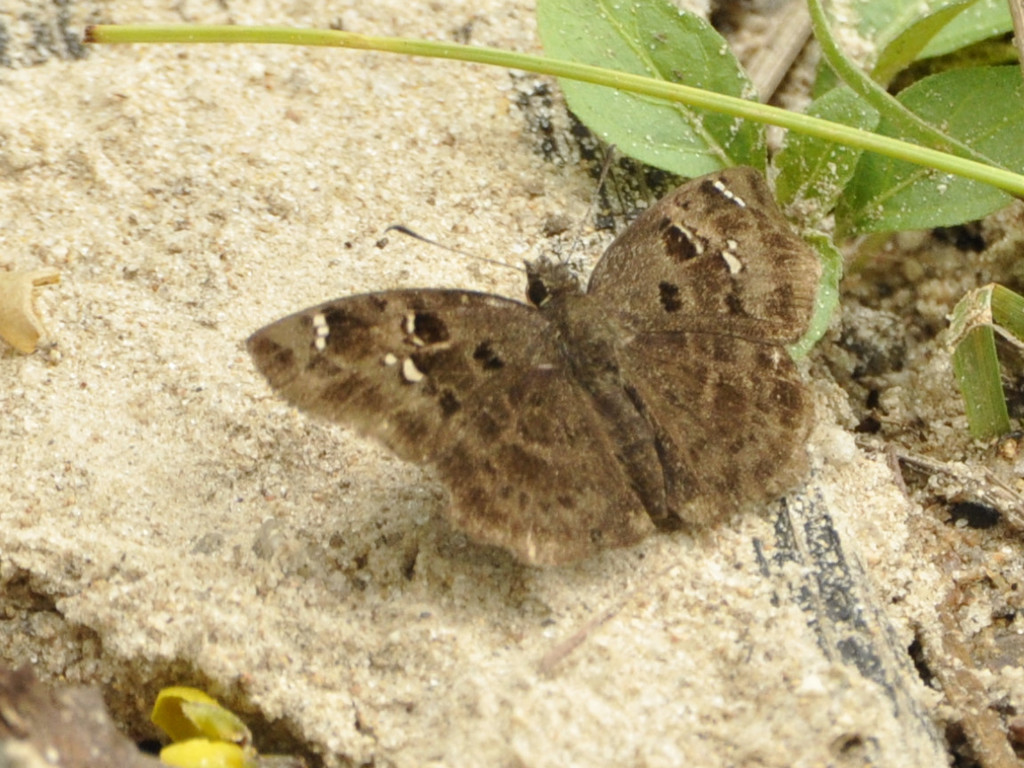

Scientific classification
- Kingdom: Animalia
- Phylum: Arthropoda
- Class: Insecta
- Order: Lepidoptera
- Family: Hesperiidae
- Genus: Eretis
- Species: E. herewardi

Binomial name
- Eretis herewardi Riley, 1921

Synonyms
- Eretis rotundimacula Evans, 1937; Eretis lugens ab. rotundimacula Mabille and Boullet, 1916

= Eretis herewardi =

Species of butterfly

Eretis herewardi is a species of butterfly in the family Hesperiidae. It is found in Angola, the Democratic Republic of the Congo, Uganda, Kenya, Tanzania, Zambia, Malawi and Mozambique. The habitat consists of woodland.

== Subspecies ==
- Eretis herewardi herewardi - Democratic Republic of the Congo, Uganda, western Kenya, Tanzania, Zambia, Malawi, Mozambique
- Eretis herewardi rotundimacula Evans, 1937 - Angola
