= Eretis vaga =

Scientific classification
- Kingdom: Animalia
- Phylum: Arthropoda
- Class: Insecta
- Order: Lepidoptera
- Family: Hesperiidae
- Genus: Eretis
- Species: E. vaga

Binomial name
- Eretis vaga Evans, 1937

Species of butterfly

Eretis vaga is a species of butterfly in the family Hesperiidae. It is found in Cameroon, the Democratic Republic of the Congo (Katanga Province), Uganda, western Kenya, north-western Tanzania and Zambia. They live in forests.
