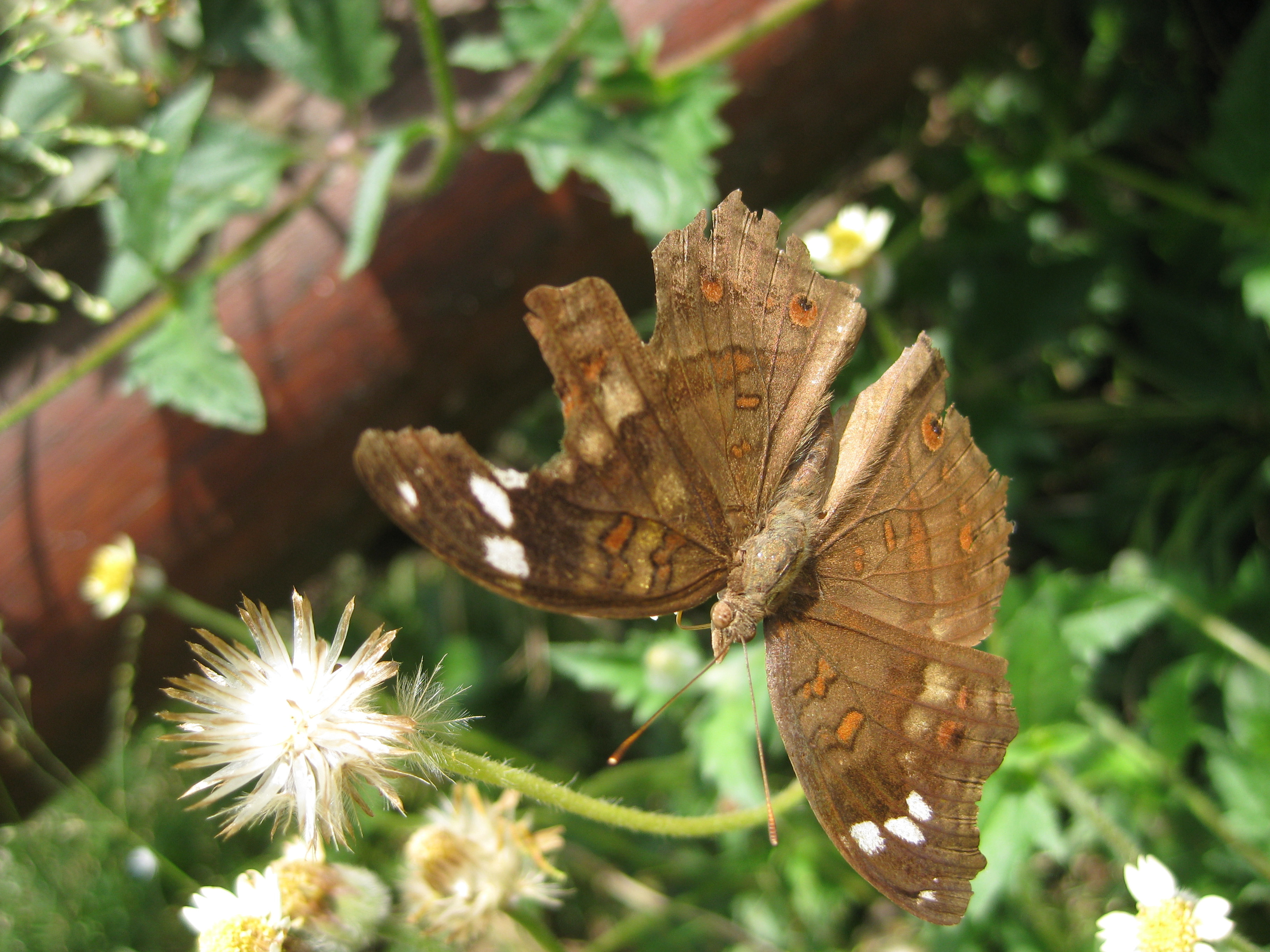

Scientific classification
- Domain: Eukaryota
- Kingdom: Animalia
- Phylum: Arthropoda
- Class: Insecta
- Order: Lepidoptera
- Family: Nymphalidae
- Genus: Junonia
- Species: J. natalica

Binomial name
- Junonia natalica (C. & R. Felder, 1860)

Synonyms
- Precis natalica Felder, 1860; Junonia hecate Trimen, 1862; Precis natalica f. natalensis Rothschild, 1918; Precis natalica angolensis Rothschild, 1918; Precis natalica var. schmidti Neustetter, 1927

= Junonia natalica =

Natal pansy

Species of butterfly

Junonia natalica, the Natal pansy or brown pansy, is a butterfly of the family Nymphalidae. It is found in the Afrotropical realm.

The wingspan is 45–50 mm in males and 48–55 mm in females.

The larvae feed on Asystasia gangetica and Phaulopsis imbricata.

== Subspecies ==
- Junonia natalica natalica (eastern and central Kenya, Tanzania, Pemba Island, Malawi, Zambia, Mozambique, Zimbabwe, northern Botswana, Namibia: Caprivi, Eswatini, South Africa: Limpopo, Mpumalanga, KwaZulu-Natal, Eastern Cape)
- Junonia natalica angolensis (Rothschild, 1918) (Angola, south-eastern Democratic Republic of the Congo, Burundi)
