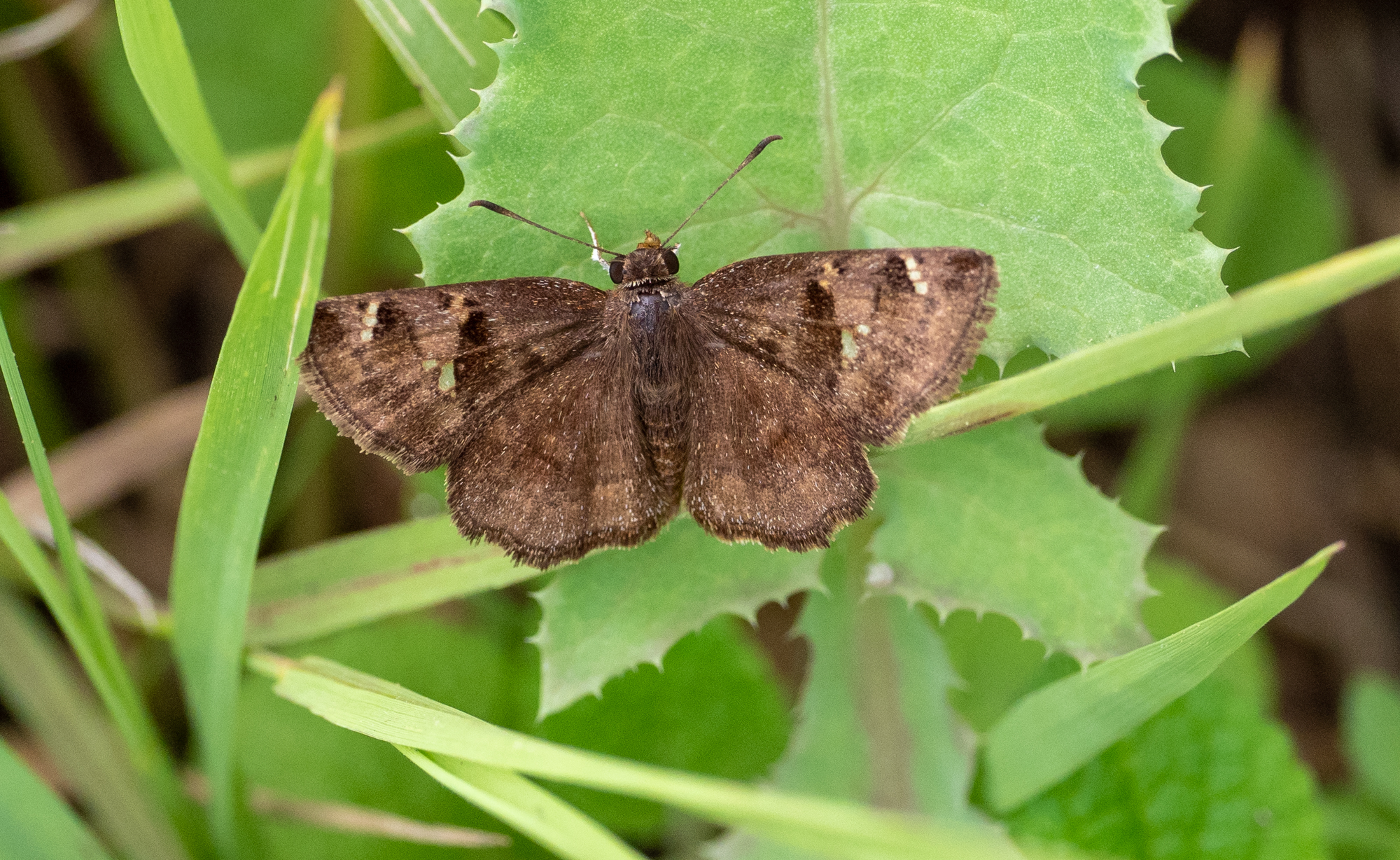

Scientific classification
- Kingdom: Animalia
- Phylum: Arthropoda
- Class: Insecta
- Order: Lepidoptera
- Family: Hesperiidae
- Genus: Eretis
- Species: E. mixta

Binomial name
- Eretis mixta Evans, 1937

Synonyms
- Eretis djaelaelae mixta Evans, 1937

= Eretis mixta =

Species of butterfly

Eretis mixta is a species of butterfly in the family Hesperiidae. It is found in Ethiopia and southern Sudan.
