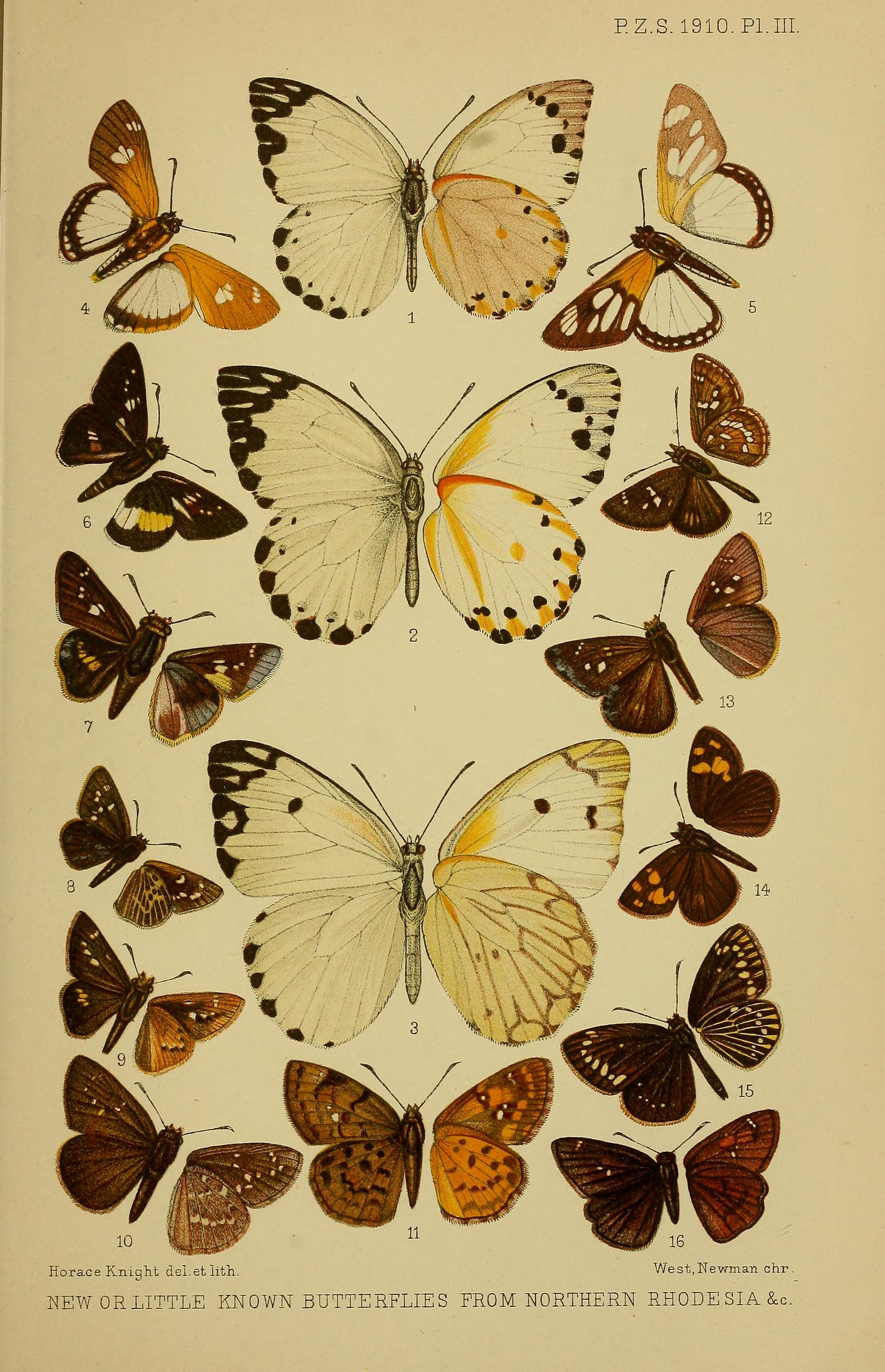
- Eretis umbra figure 16

Scientific classification
- Kingdom: Animalia
- Phylum: Arthropoda
- Class: Insecta
- Order: Lepidoptera
- Family: Hesperiidae
- Tribe: Celaenorrhinini
- Genus: Eretis; Mabille, 1891

= Eretis =

Genus of butterflies

Eretis is a genus of skippers in the family Hesperiidae.

== Species ==
- Eretis buamba Evans, 1937
- Eretis camerona Evans, 1937
- Eretis djaelaelae (Wallengren, 1857)
- Eretis herewardi Riley, 1921
- Eretis lugens (Rogenhofer, 1891)
- Eretis melania Mabille, 1891
- Eretis mitiana Evans, 1937
- Eretis mixta Evans, 1937
- Eretis plistonicus (Plötz, 1879)
- Eretis umbra (Trimen, 1862)
- Eretis vaga Evans, 1937
