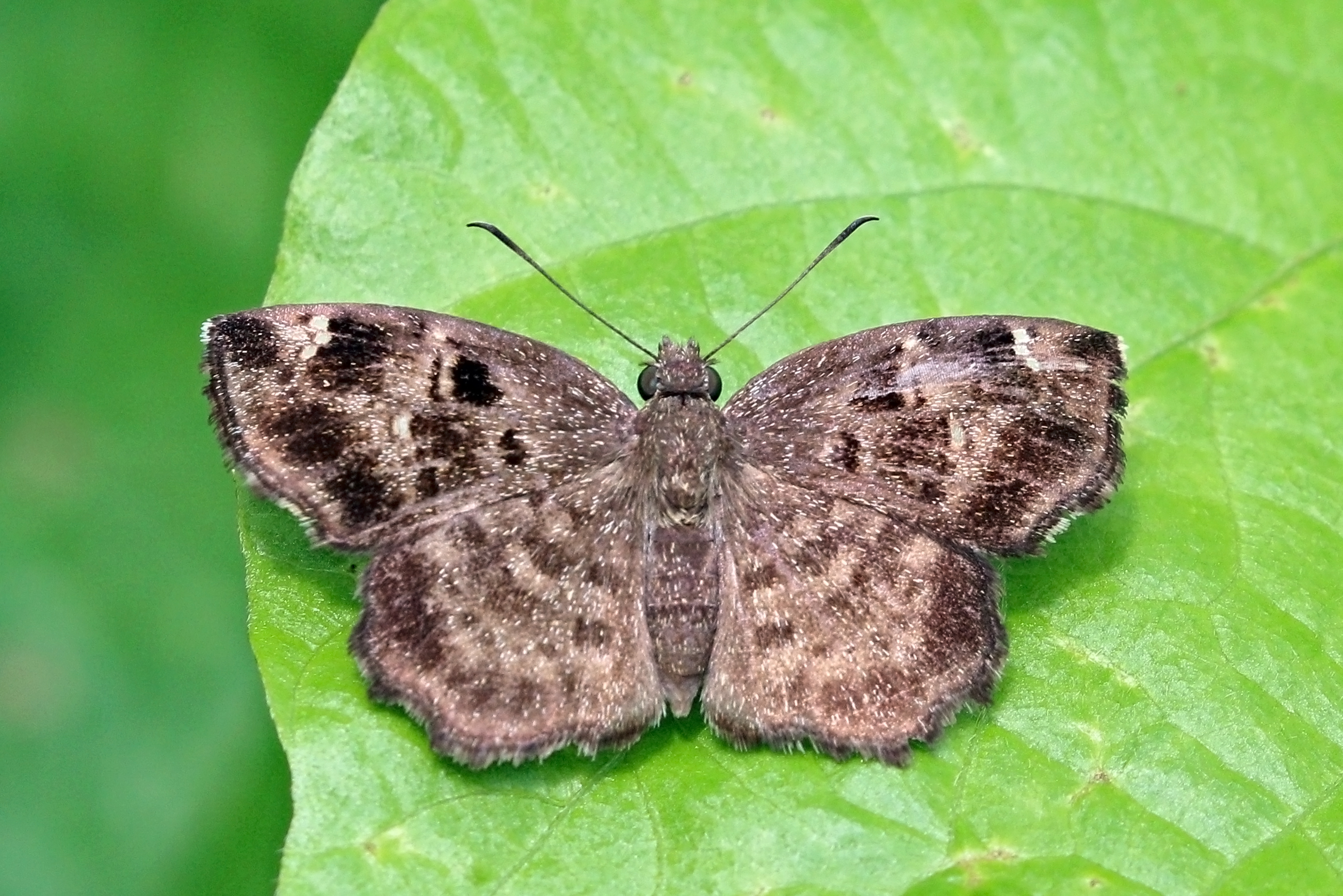
- Aburi Botanical Gardens, Ghana

Scientific classification
- Kingdom: Animalia
- Phylum: Arthropoda
- Class: Insecta
- Order: Lepidoptera
- Family: Hesperiidae
- Genus: Eretis
- Species: E. melania

Binomial name
- Eretis melania Mabille, 1891

Synonyms
- Sarangesa perpaupera Holland, 1892

= Eretis melania =

Species of butterfly

Eretis melania, also known as the dusky elf, dusky skipper or common elf, is a species of butterfly in the family Hesperiidae. It is found in Guinea, Sierra Leone, Liberia, Ivory Coast, Ghana, Togo, Nigeria, Cameroon, Gabon, Angola, the Democratic Republic of the Congo, southern Sudan, Uganda, Kenya, Tanzania, Malawi, northern Zambia, Mozambique, eastern Zimbabwe and northern Namibia. The habitat consists of woodland, Guinea savanna, forest margins and forests.

Adults of both sexes are attracted to flowers. Adults are on wing from July to September and again from March to April in two generations per year.
