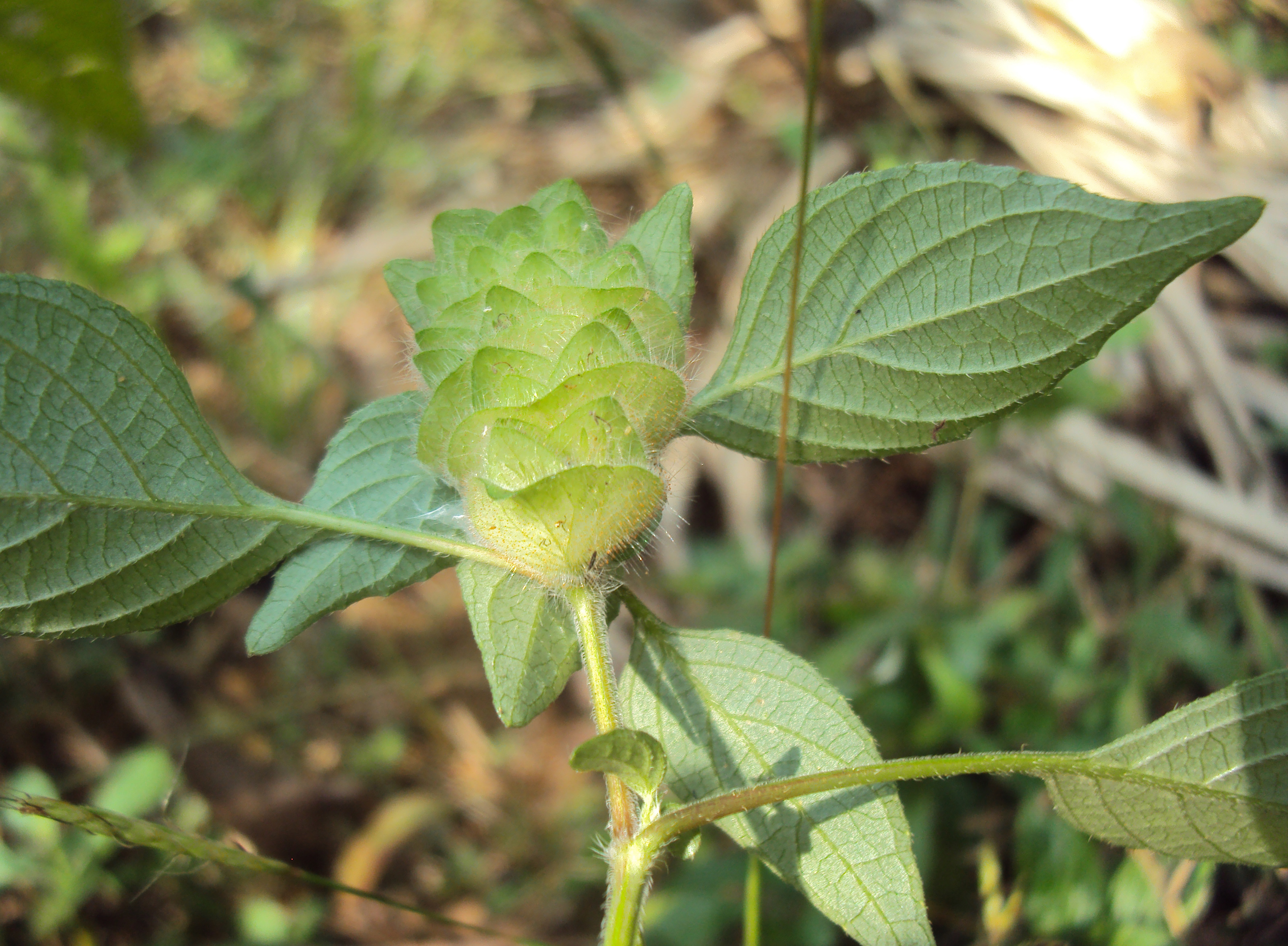

Conservation status
- Least Concern (IUCN 3.1)

Scientific classification
- Kingdom: Plantae
- Clade: Tracheophytes
- Clade: Angiosperms
- Clade: Eudicots
- Clade: Asterids
- Order: Lamiales
- Family: Acanthaceae
- Genus: Phaulopsis
- Species: P. imbricata

Binomial name
- Phaulopsis imbricata (Forssk.) Sweet

Synonyms
- Aetheilema anisophyllum R.Br.; Aetheilema anisophyllum E.Mey. ex Nees; Aetheilema glutinosum Steud.; Aetheilema imbricatum R.Br.; Aetheilema imbricatum (Forssk.) Spreng.; Aetheilema longifolium Spreng.; Aetheilema mucronatum Griff.; Aetheilema parviflorum Spreng.; Aetheilema reniforme Nees; Aetheilema rothii Steud.; Antheilema imbricata Raf.; Barleria inaequalis Hochst. ex A.Rich.; Blechum anisophyllum Juss.; Phaulopsis longifolia Sims; Phaulopsis parviflora Willd.; Ruellia imbricata Forssk.

= Phaulopsis imbricata =

Species of shrub

Phaulopsis imbricata is a shrub native to South Africa. Leaves are opposite, one larger than the other in each pair, usually asymmetrical at the base. Phaulopsis imbricata is a good fodder, the young leaves are eaten as a vegetable and the plant-ash in oil is rubbed into scarifications on the back for rheumatism in Tanganyika. The flowers have an unpleasant smell. It is filed as near-threatened by the IUCN. It is one of the larval host plants of the butterflies great eggfly, tiny grass blue, brown pansy, soldier pansy and marbled elf.
