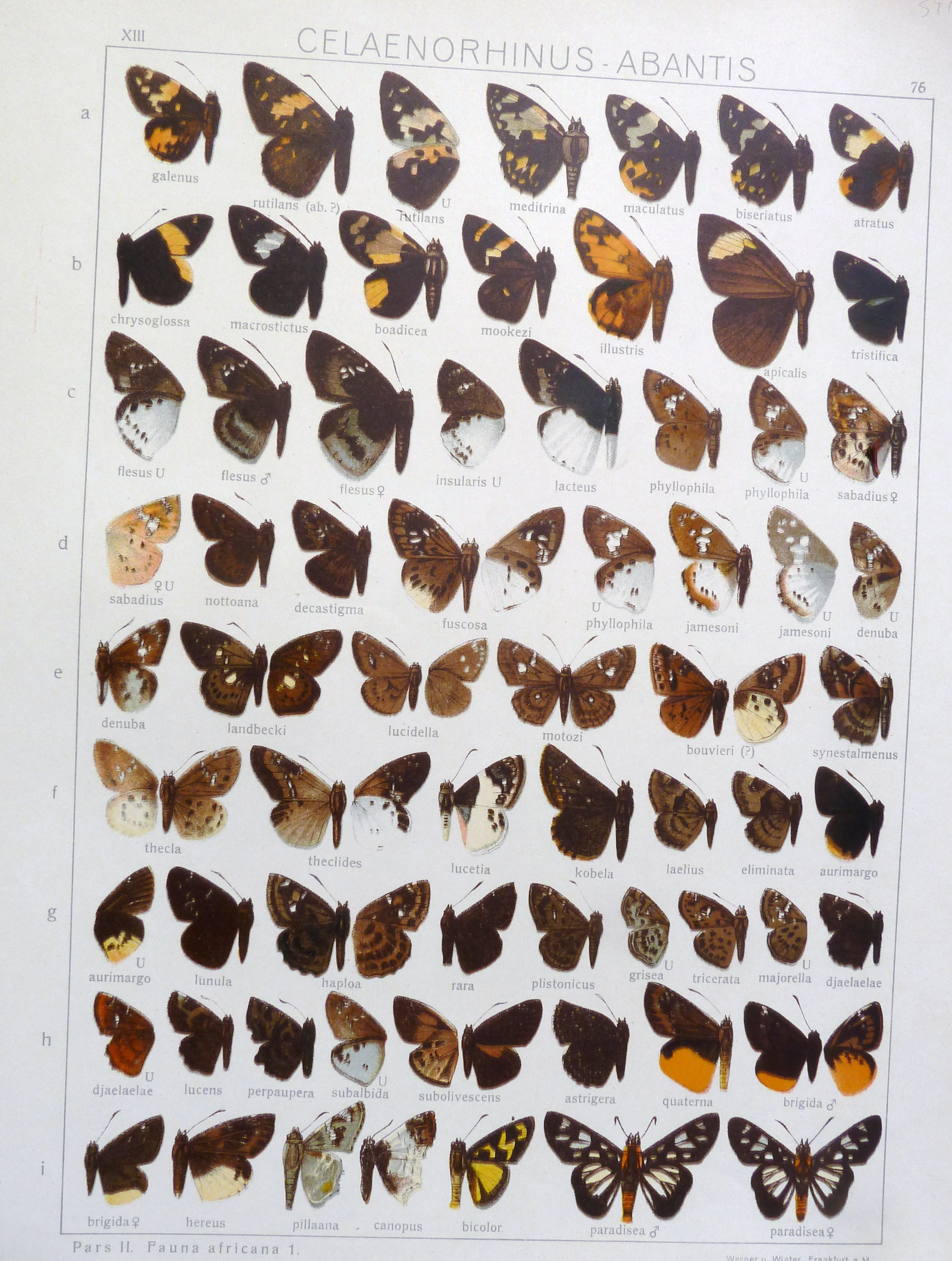

Scientific classification
- Kingdom: Animalia
- Phylum: Arthropoda
- Clade: Pancrustacea
- Class: Insecta
- Order: Lepidoptera
- Family: Hesperiidae
- Genus: Eretis
- Species: E. plistonicus

Binomial name
- Eretis plistonicus (Plötz, 1879)

Synonyms
- Antigonus plistonicus Plötz, 1879

= Eretis plistonicus =

Species of butterfly

Eretis plistonicus, commonly known as the Ghana elf, is a species of butterfly in the family Hesperiidae. It is found in Guinea, Ivory Coast, Togo and Nigeria. The habitat consists of forest edges and secondary growth.

The larvae feed on Acanthaceae species.

Torben Larsen developed a species numbering system for his 2005 publication Butterflies of West Africa. This species is #1243. The 'Larsen' numbers have since been used with permission in A Sharp Eye on Butterflies of Ghana.
