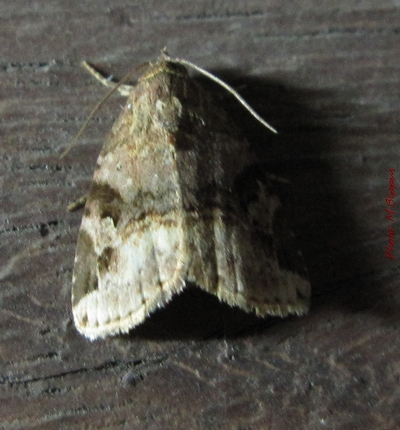

Scientific classification
- Kingdom: Animalia
- Phylum: Arthropoda
- Clade: Pancrustacea
- Class: Insecta
- Order: Lepidoptera
- Superfamily: Noctuoidea
- Family: Noctuidae
- Genus: Microplexia
- Species: M. costimaculalis

Binomial name
- Microplexia costimaculalis Guillermet, 1992

= Microplexia costimaculalis =

Species of moth

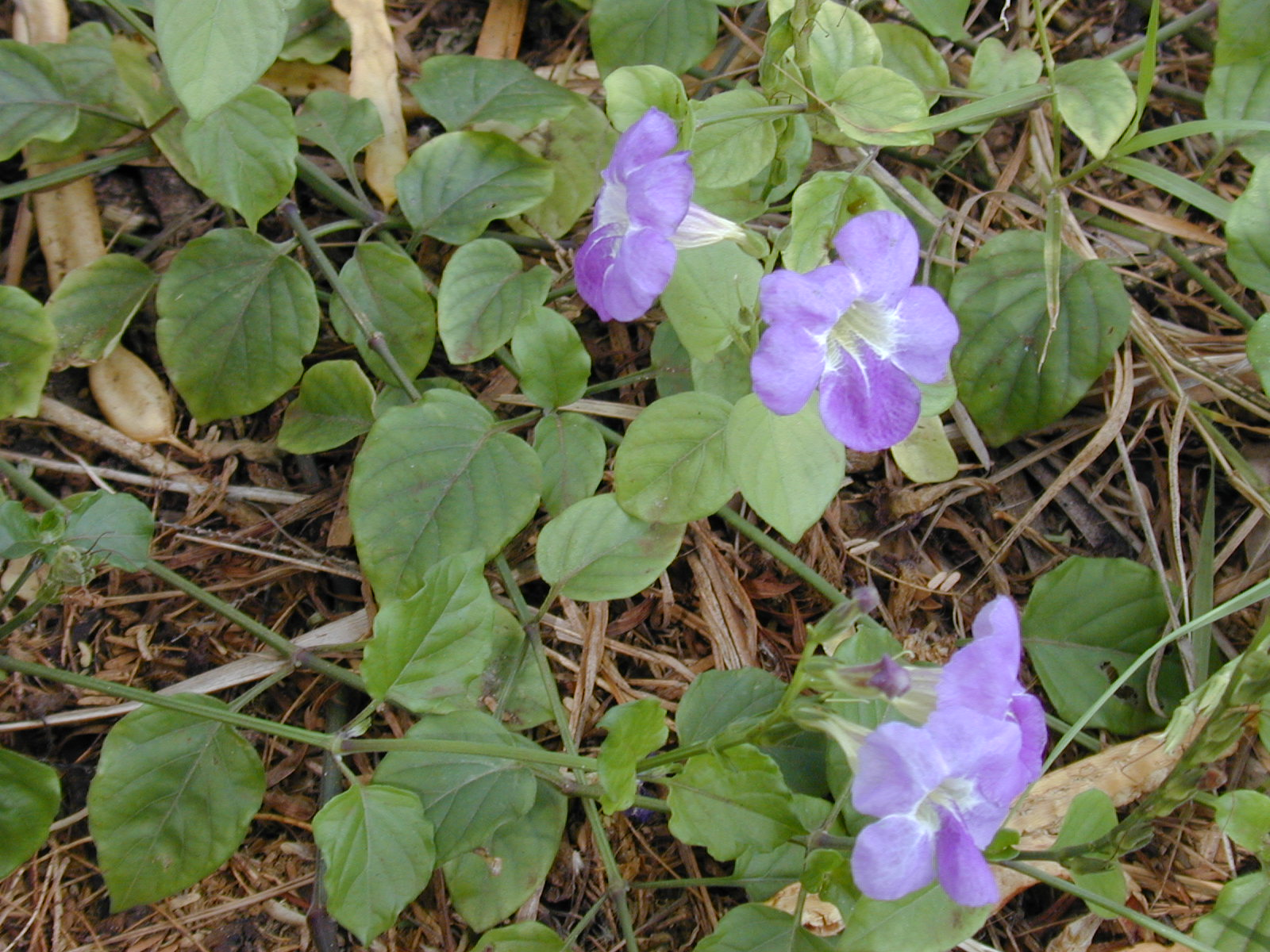
Asystasia gangetica, one of its host plants

Microplexia costimaculalis is a moth of the family Noctuidae. It is endemic on the island of Réunion in the Indian Ocean. It has a wingspan of 22–24 mm.

The larvae feed on Clerodendrum speciosissimum and Asystasia gangetica.
