= Junonia terea =

Soldier pansy
- J. t. terea Ghana

Scientific classification
- Kingdom: Animalia
- Phylum: Arthropoda
- Clade: Pancrustacea
- Class: Insecta
- Order: Lepidoptera
- Family: Nymphalidae
- Genus: Junonia
- Species: J. terea

Binomial name
- Junonia terea (Drury, 1773)

Synonyms
- Papilio terea Drury, 1773; Precis terea; Junonia zipha Butler, 1869; Precis terea fumata Rothschild & Jordan, 1903; Precis terea f. januarii Ungemach, 1932; Precis tereoides Butler, 1901; Precis terea elgiva ab. gomensis Dufrane, 1945

Species of butterfly

Junonia terea, the soldier pansy or soldier commodore, is a butterfly of the family Nymphalidae. The species was first described by Dru Drury in 1773. It is found in the Afrotropical realm.

The wingspan is 50–55 mm in males and 52–60 mm in females.

The larvae feed on Asystasia gangetica, Phaulopsis imbricata, and Ruellia patula.

== Subspecies ==
- Junonia terea terea (Senegal, the Gambia, Guinea-Bissau, Guinea, Sierra Leone, Liberia, Ivory Coast, Burkina Faso, Ghana, Togo, Benin, Nigeria, Cameroon, Gabon, Congo, Democratic Republic of the Congo, western Kenya)
- Junonia terea fumata (Rothschild & Jordan, 1903) (Ethiopia, Somalia)
- Junonia terea tereoides (Butler, 1901) (northern Democratic Republic of the Congo, southern Sudan, Uganda, central Kenya, north-western Tanzania)

Torben Larsen developed a species numbering system for his 2005 publication Butterflies of West Africa. The nominate subspecies is #823. The 'Larsen' numbers have since been used with permission in A Sharp Eye on Butterflies of Ghana.

J. t. elgiva
Arusha National Park, Tanzania

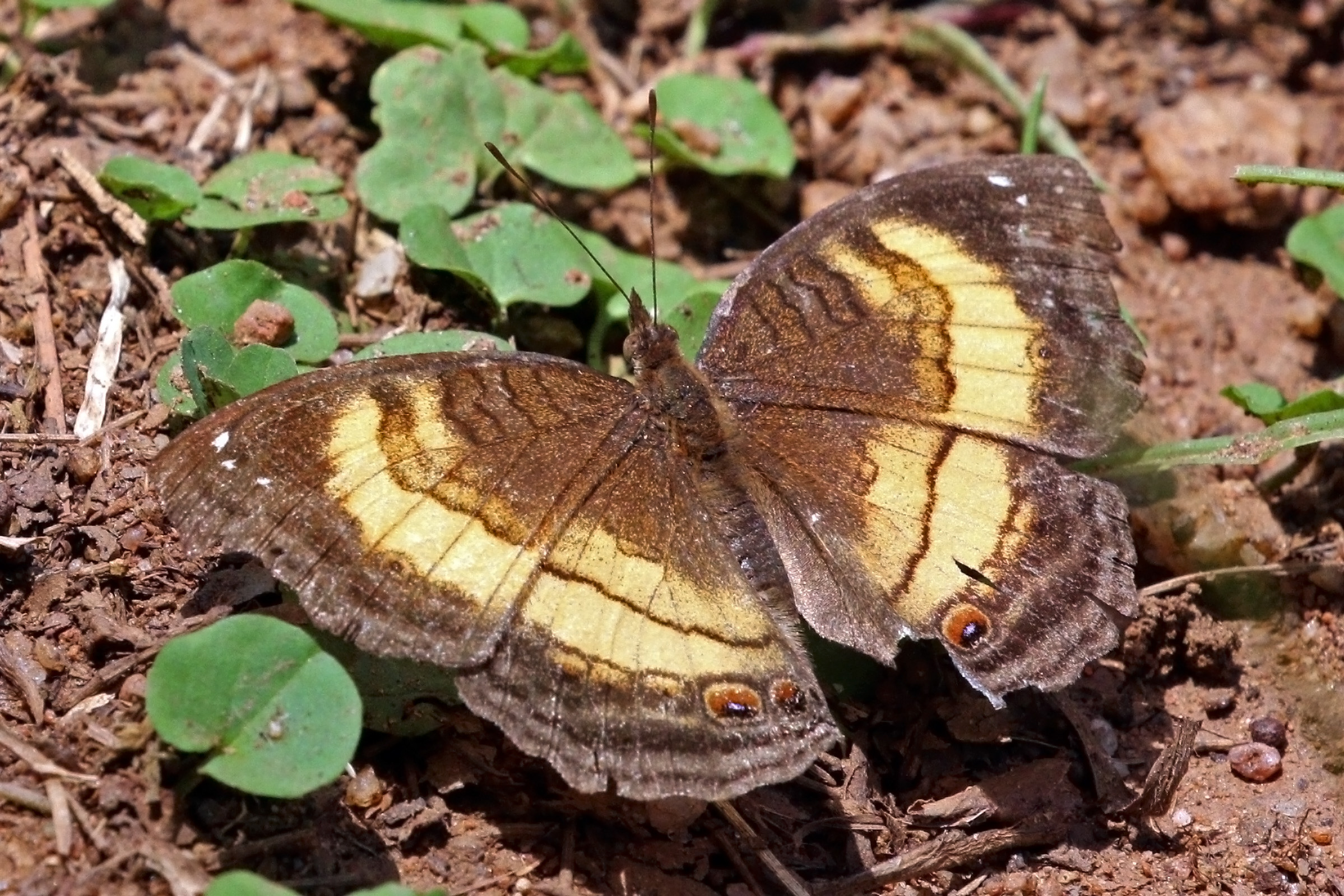
J. t. teroides
Kibale Forest, Uganda

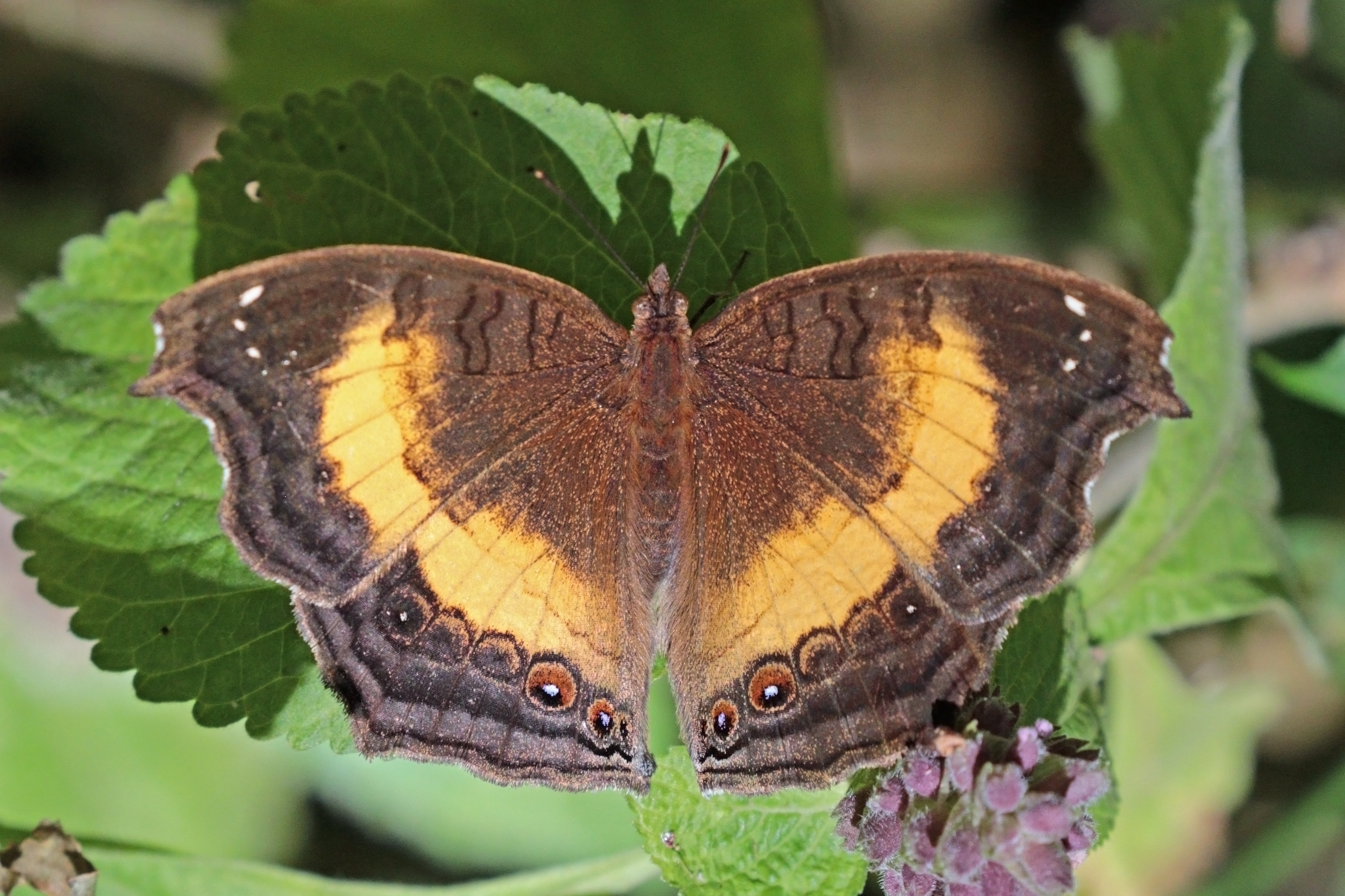
J. t. fumata
Harenna Forest, Ethiopia

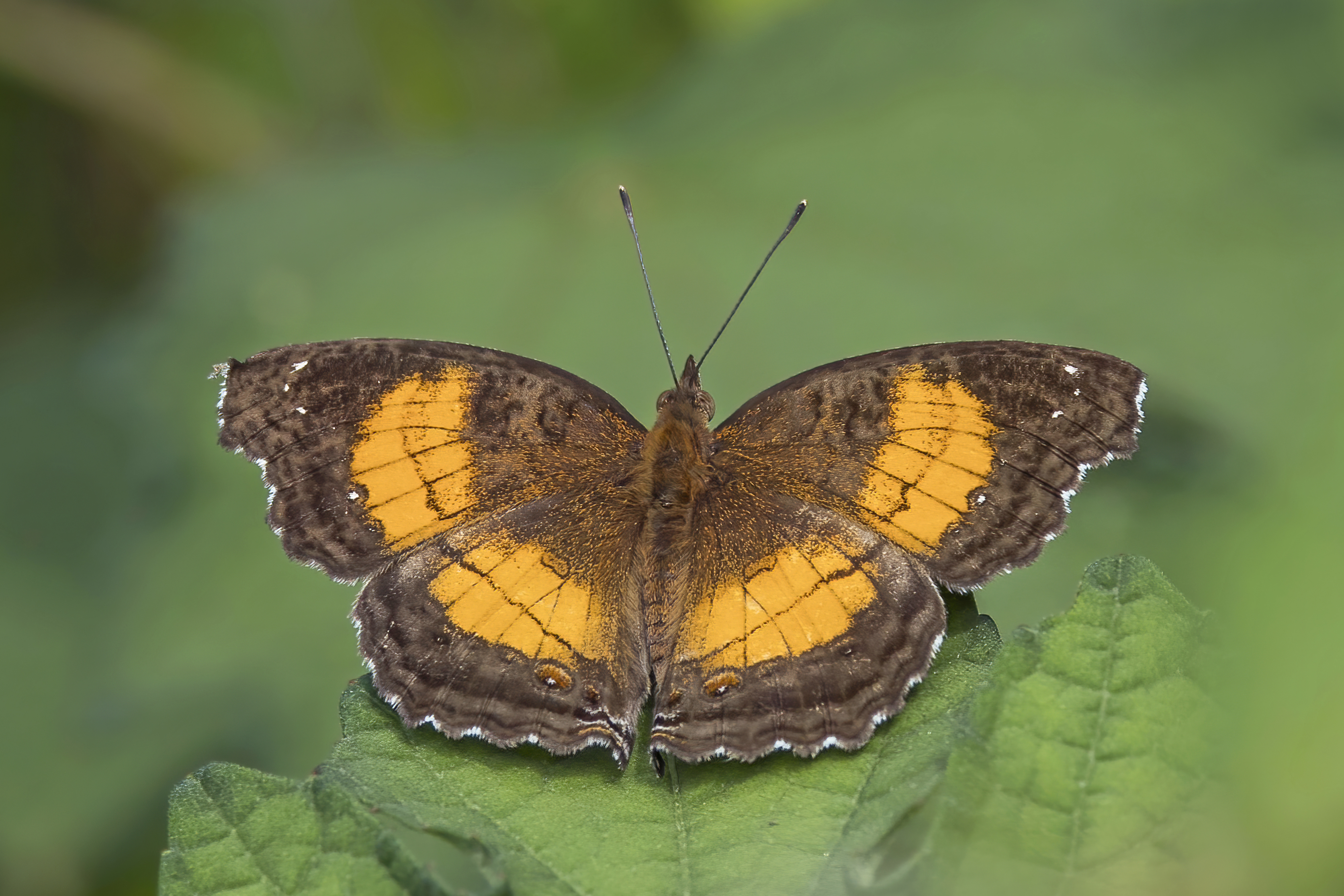
female ssp. unknown
São Tomé and Príncipe
