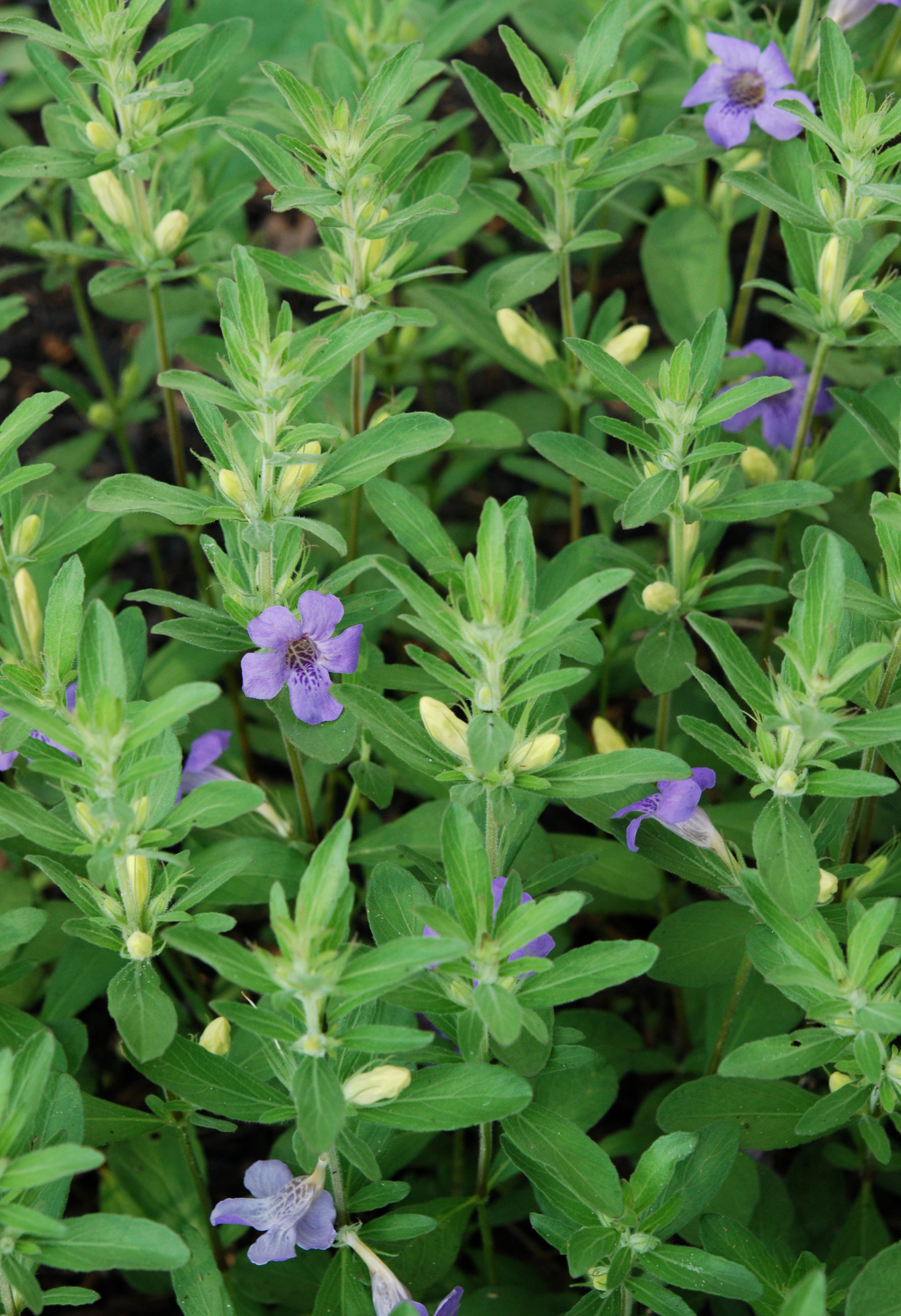

Scientific classification
- Kingdom: Plantae
- Clade: Embryophytes
- Clade: Tracheophytes
- Clade: Spermatophytes
- Clade: Angiosperms
- Clade: Eudicots
- Clade: Asterids
- Order: Lamiales
- Family: Acanthaceae
- Genus: Dyschoriste
- Species: D. oblongifolia

Binomial name
- Dyschoriste oblongifolia (Michx.) Kuntze

= Dyschoriste oblongifolia =

Species of flowering plant

Dyschoriste oblongifolia is a species of the genus Dyschoriste, in the family Acanthaceae. Dyschoriste oblongifolia is also called oblongleaf snakeherb or twinflower.

== Description ==
Dyschoriste oblongifolia is a herbaceous, rhizomatous, perennial plant growing 10–50 cm (4–20 in) tall. Stems and foliage are mostly hairless. Leaves are arranged opposite, with an entire or undulate margin, an obtuse or acute tip, a cuneate or attenuate base, and a hairy surface. They are approximately 4.5 centimeters in length and 1.5 centimeters in width. D. oblongifolia produces flowers that are subsessile and either solitary or clusters on the stem with bracts that appear similar to the leaves. The flowers often appear in pairs, hence the "Twinflower" name. Flowers are lavender in color, with five lobes, four stamens, and a style 1.5 cm long. It grows in dry, sandy pine forests and flowers from June to August.

== Distribution ==
Dyschoriste oblongifolia grows natively in the United States in the coastal plains regions from Virginia to Florida, but is able to grow throughout the southeastern US and along the western coast.

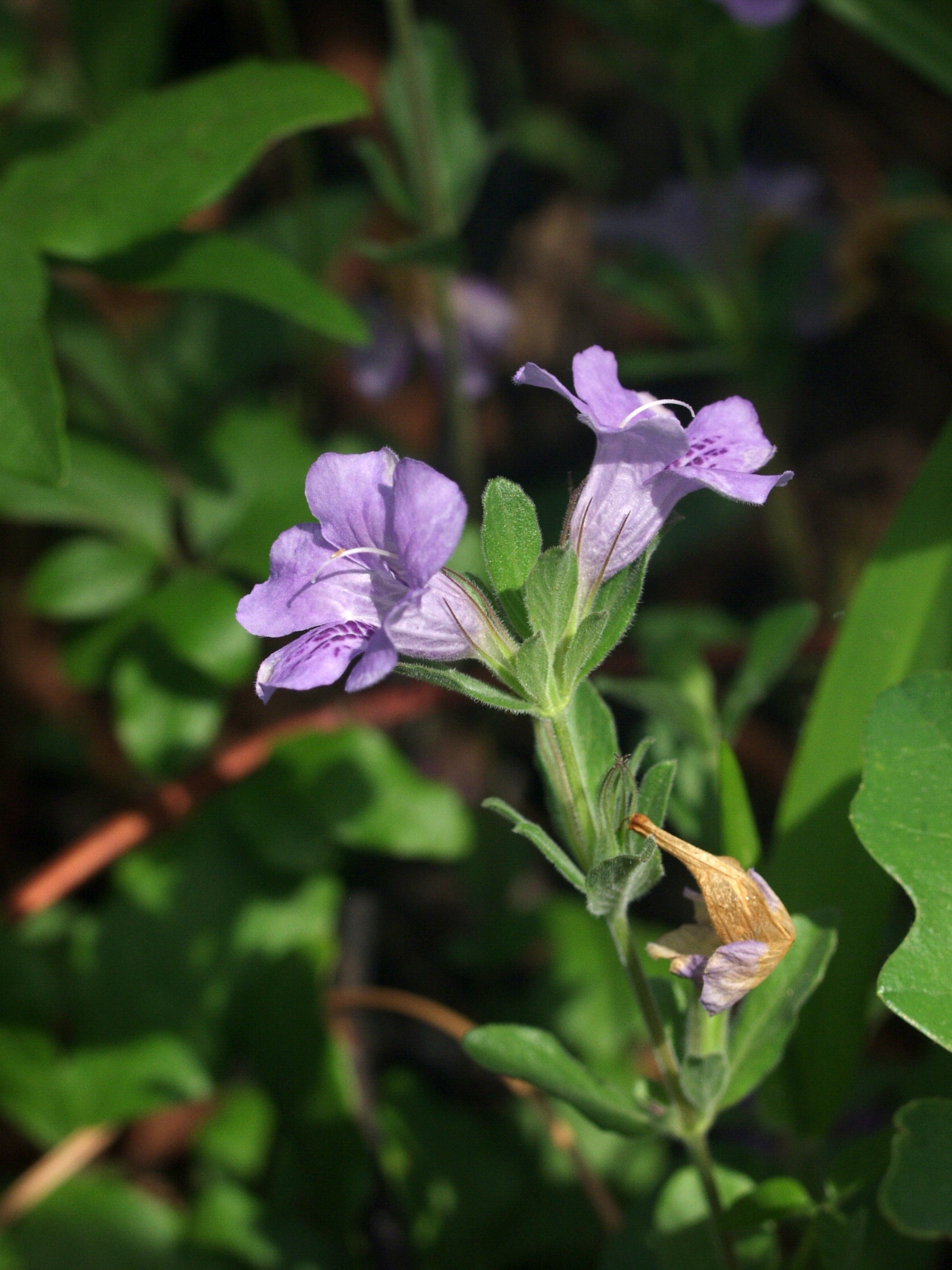
Twinflower typically has groups of two flowers.

== Habitat, Ecology, and Usage ==
Dyschoriste oblongifolia is a tolerant plant that can grow in acidic or slightly alkaline soil of sand, loam, or clay. It has high drought tolerance and low salt tolerance. Fire, whether Prescribed Fire or Wildfire, is a key part of the plant's life cycle. Populations will disappear over time if fire does not occur.

Gardeners sometimes plant Dyschoriste oblongifolia in their butterfly gardens as a larval host plant for the common buckeye butterfly, and the plant is a recommended ornamental groundcover due to its high drought tolerance and low maintenance requirements.

Dyschoriste oblongifolia is insect pollinated and is recorded to have been visited in northern Florida by Agapostemon splendens, Augochlorella aurata, Augochloropsis sumptuosa, Ceratina, Halictus poeyi/ligatus, Lasioglossum tegulare/puteulanum, Lasioglossum weemsi/leviense, Megachile petulans, and Melissodes communis.
