= Eretis mitiana =

Scientific classification
- Kingdom: Animalia
- Phylum: Arthropoda
- Class: Insecta
- Order: Lepidoptera
- Family: Hesperiidae
- Genus: Eretis
- Species: E. mitiana

Binomial name
- Eretis mitiana Evans, 1937

Species of butterfly

Eretis mitiana is a species of butterfly in the family Hesperiidae. It is found in Uganda, western Kenya and western Tanzania. The habitat consists of highland forests.
