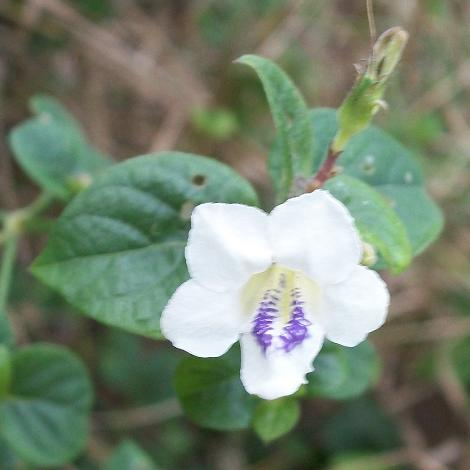
- Asystasia gangetica micrantha from Amanzimtoti, South Africa

Scientific classification
- Kingdom: Plantae
- Clade: Tracheophytes
- Clade: Angiosperms
- Clade: Eudicots
- Clade: Asterids
- Order: Lamiales
- Family: Acanthaceae
- Genus: Asystasia
- Species: A. gangetica

Binomial name
- Asystasia gangetica (L.) T.Anderson

Synonyms
- Asystasia intrusa (Forssk.) Blume; Asystasia parvula C.B.Clarke; Asystasia querimbensis Klotzsch; Asystasia pubescens Klotzsch; Asystasia subhastata Klotzsch; Asystasia quarterna Nees; Asystasia scabrida Klotzsch; Asystasia floribunda Klotzsch; Asystasia coromandeliana Nees; Justicia gangetica L.; Asystasia bojeriana Nees; Asystasia acuminata Klotzsch; Asystasia coromandeliana Nees var. micrantha Nees; Asystasia multiflora Klotzsch; Asystasia ansellioides C.B.Clarke var. lanceolata Fiori; Asystasia podostachys Klotzsch

= Asystasia gangetica =

Chinese violet

Medicinal plants of Asia

Asystasia gangetica is a species of plant in the family Acanthaceae. It is commonly known as the Chinese violet, coromandel or creeping foxglove. In South Africa this plant may simply be called asystasia.

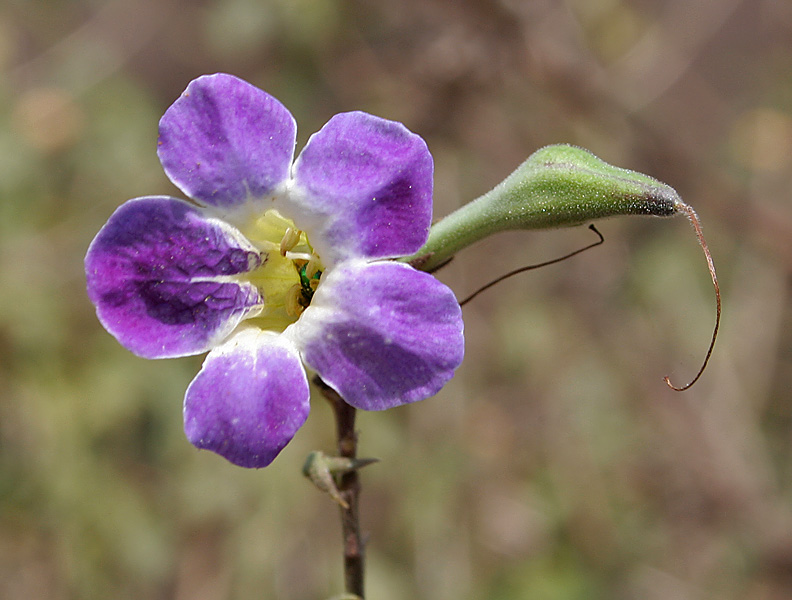
From Hyderabad, India

== Description ==
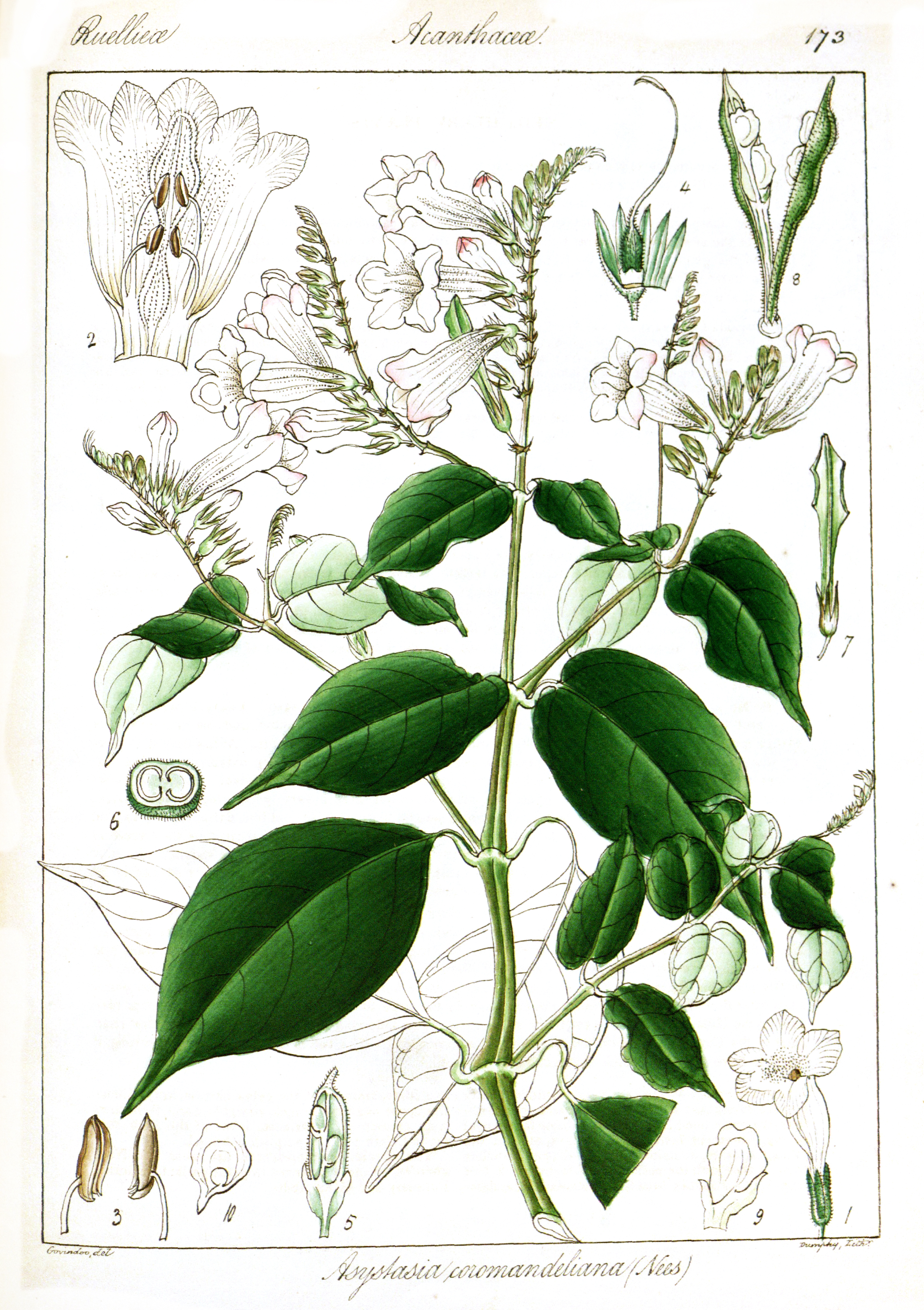
Botanical illustration of Asystasia gangetica.

This plant is a spreading herb or groundcover, reaching 600 mm in height or up to 1 m if supported. The stems root easily at the nodes. The leaves are simple and opposite. The fruit is an explosive capsule which starts out green in colour, but dries to brown after opening.

== Subspecies ==
- A. g. gangetica, has larger (30–40 mm long) blue or mauve flowers.
- A. g. micrantha (Nees) Ensermu, has smaller (up to 25 mm long.) white flowers with purple markings on the lower lip.

== Distribution ==
Widespread throughout the Old World Tropics, and introduced into tropical Americas and Hawaii, where it has become naturalized. Both subspecies of this plant have been introduced to Australia where A. g. micrantha is on the National Environmental Alert List and must be reported when found. The original range of the subspecies is unclear, but it is likely that A. g. gangetica was limited to Asia, and A. g. micrantha was limited to Africa.

== Reproduction ==
Ernest Akamine (1947) found that there were no apparent dormancy mechanisms operating in the seeds, which germinated freely 135 days after being expelled from parent plants. Flower production can begin as early as 40 days after germination, with seed development beginning after 57 days, facilitating the production of viable seed in as little as 72 days. The seeds are then expelled explosively upon ripening via hooked retinacula (pictured).

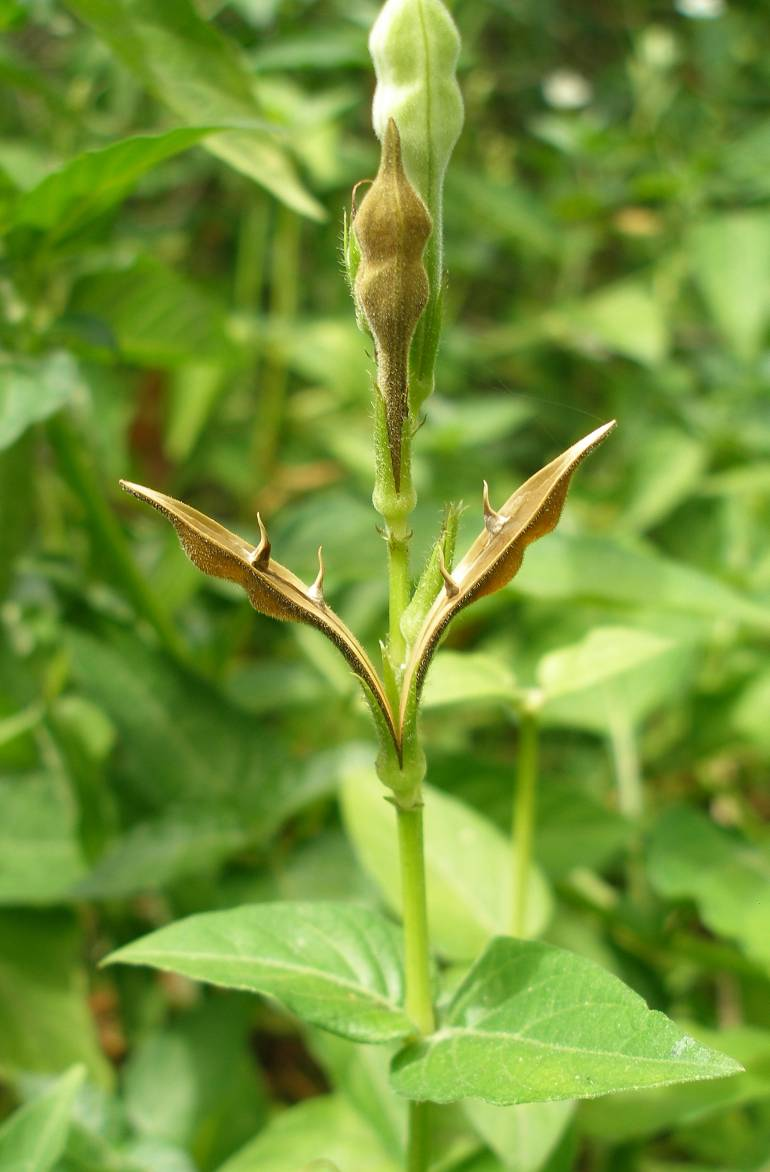
Asystasia gangetica seed head

== Uses ==
In some parts of Africa, the leaves are eaten as a vegetable and used as an herbal remedy in traditional African medicine. The leaves are used in many parts of Nigeria as a traditional African medicine for the management of asthma. It is also used as an ornamental plant.

== Ecological significance ==
This is an important plant for honeybees, butterflies and other insects. In southern Africa there are at least seven species of butterfly and moth that use A. g. micrantha as a larval foodplant; Junonia oenone, Junonia hierta, Junonia natalica, Junonia terea, Protogoniomorpha parhassus, Hypolimnas misippus and Microplexia costimaculalis. The vigorous growth of A. g. micrantha in tropical regions makes it a weed which can smother certain indigenous vegetation where it has been introduced.

== Gallery ==
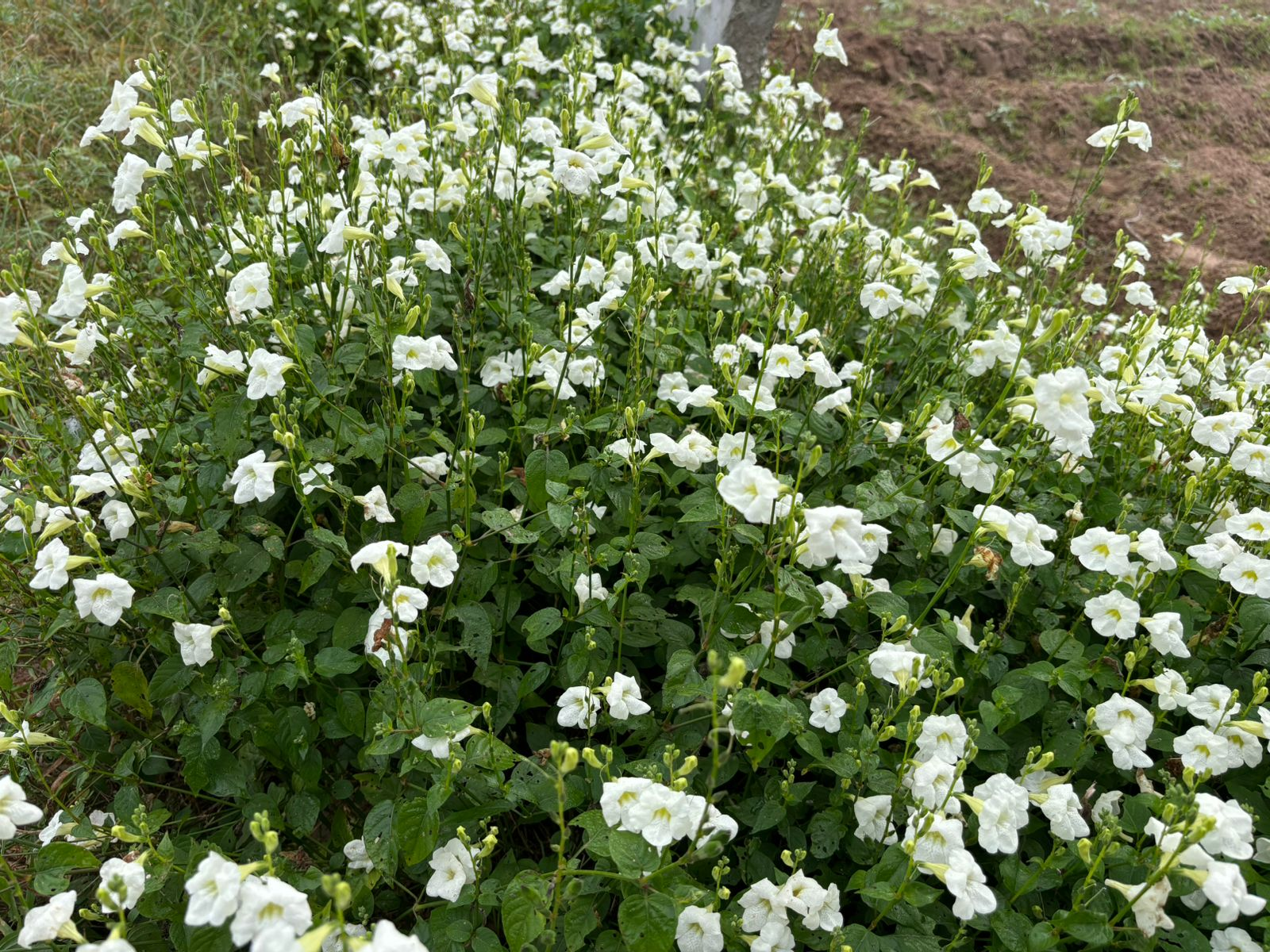
Asystasia Gangetia White @ SahajaSiddha BuchiReddypalem, Nellore district, Andhra pradesh, India.

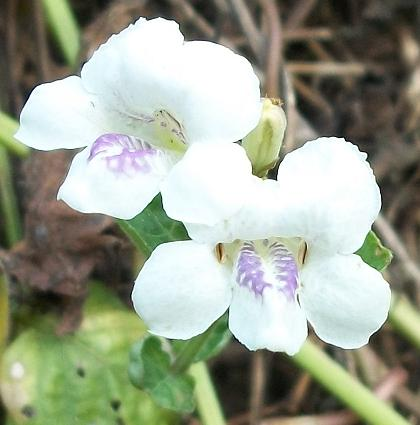
From Amanzimtoti, South Africa.

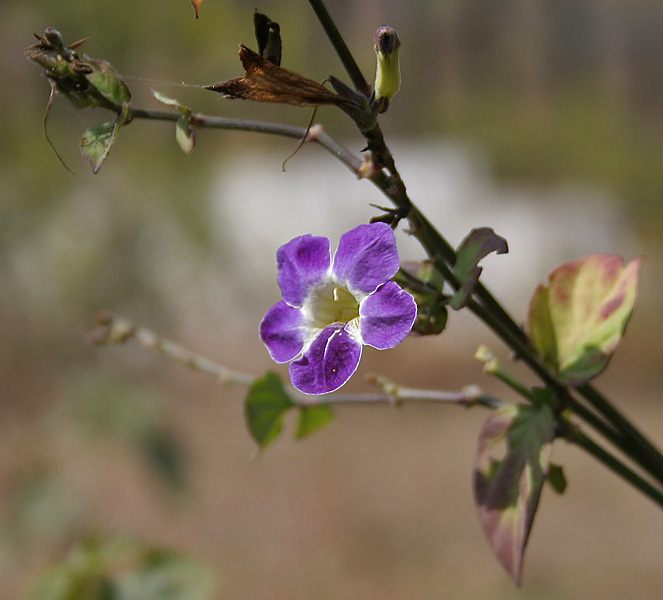
From Hyderabad, India.

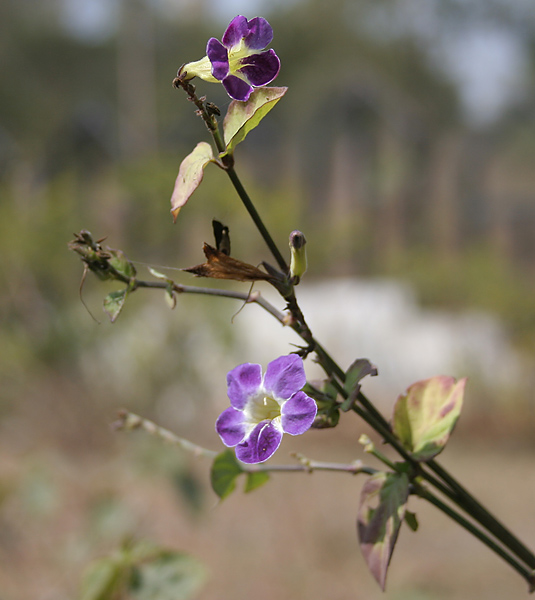
From Hyderabad, India.

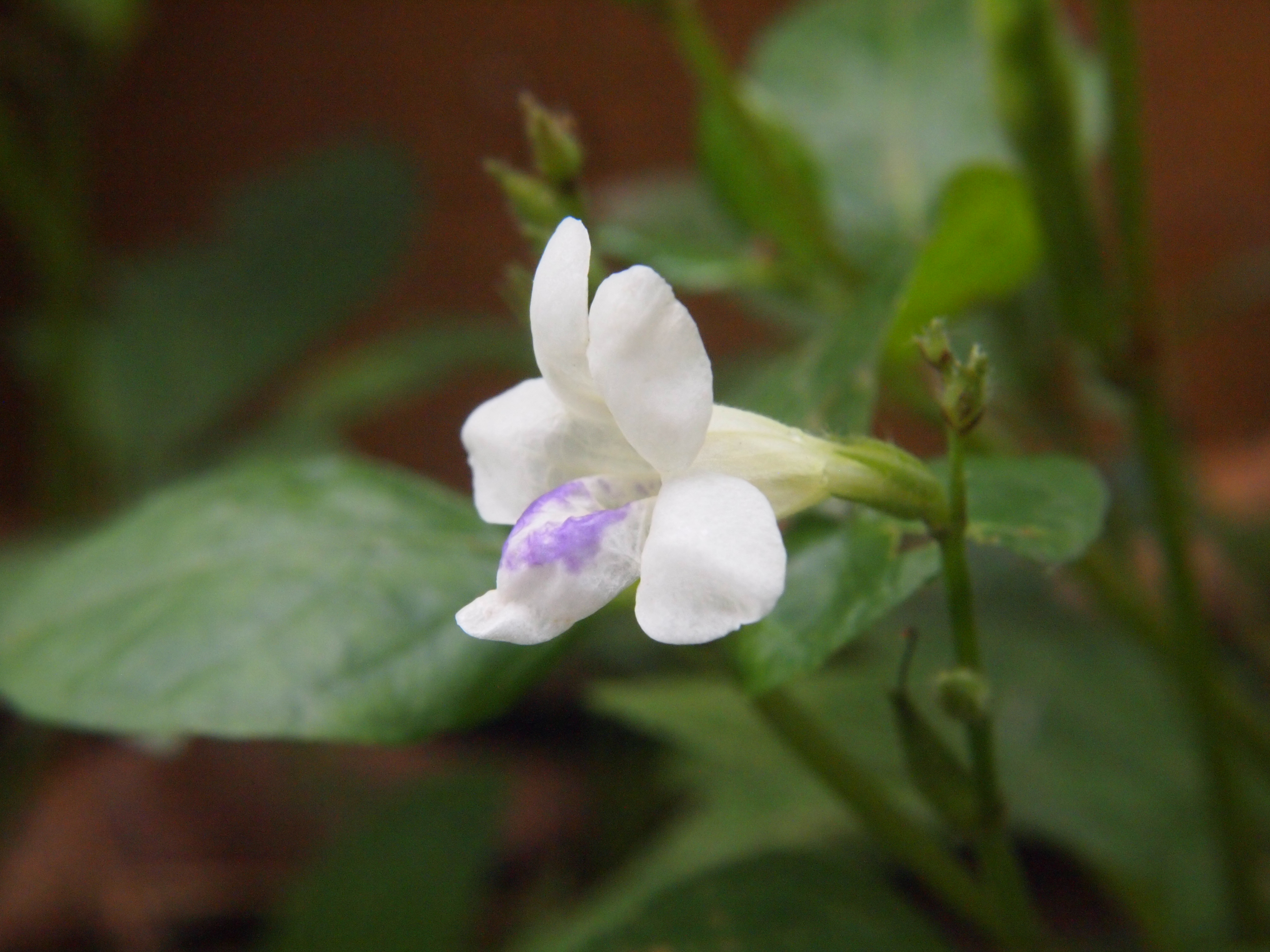
Found in Malaysia

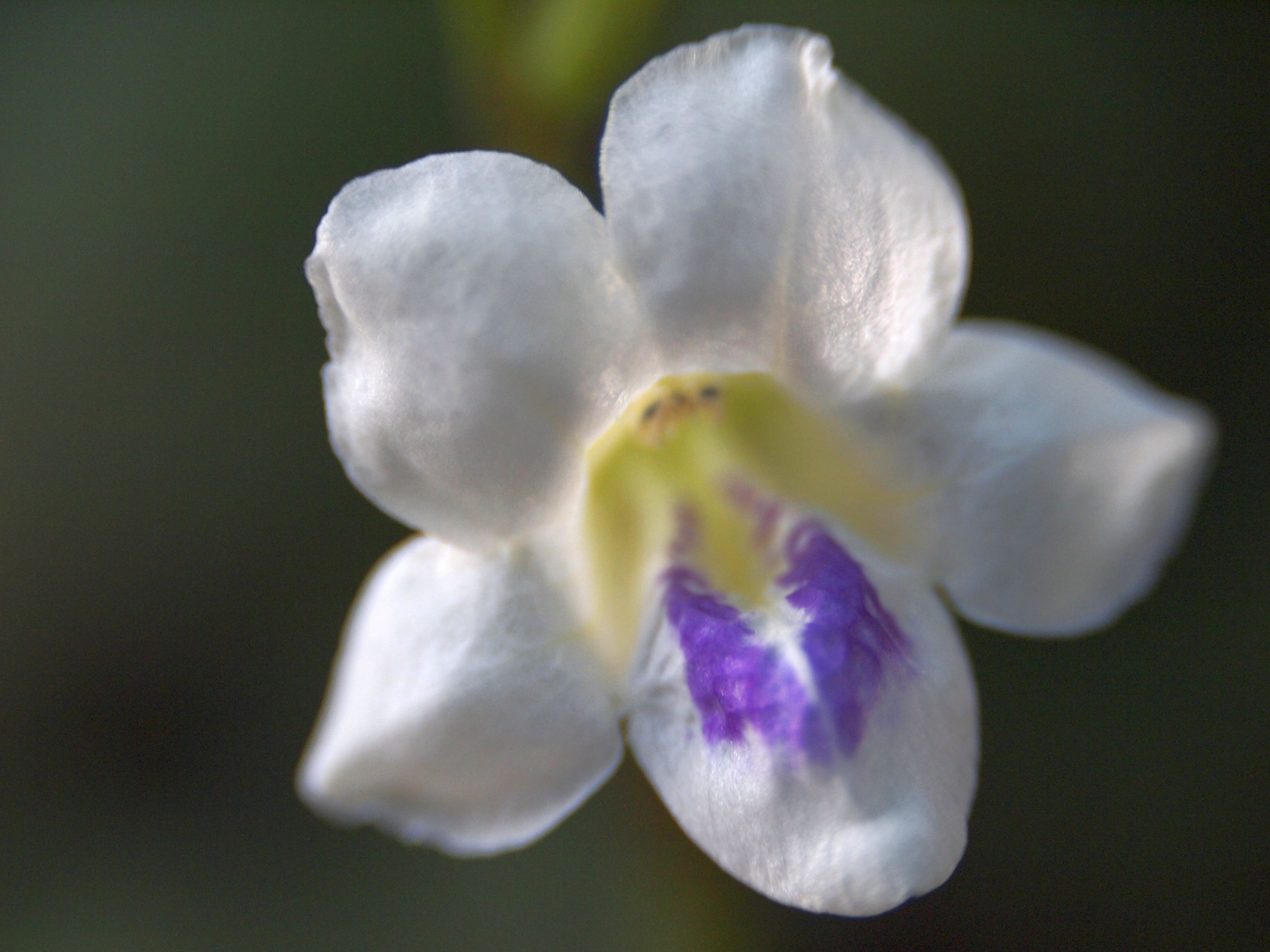
Asystasia gangetica in Malaysia

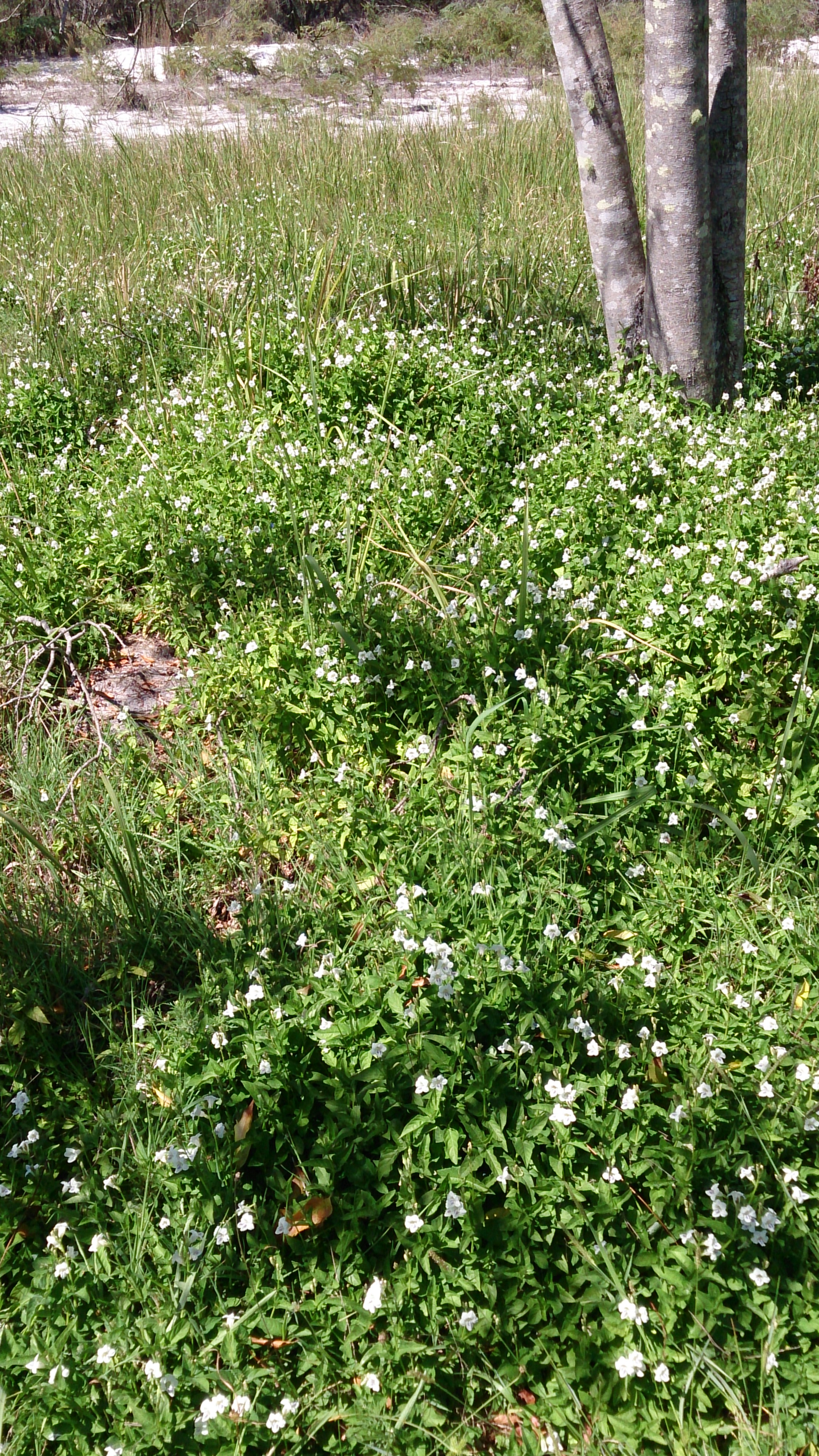
Asystasia gangetica Anna Bay, NSW, Australia

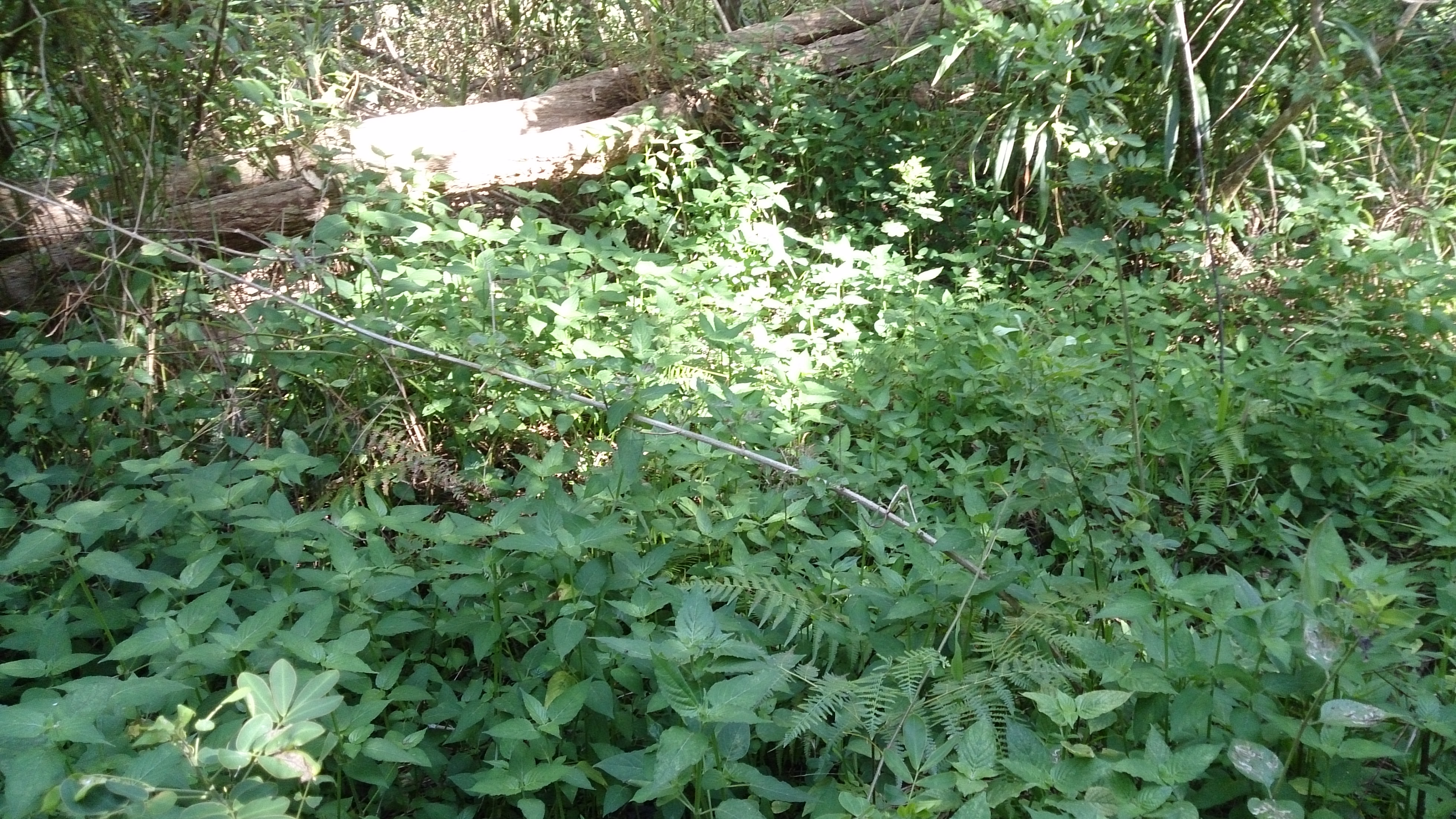
Asystasia gangetica smothering rainforest understory. Gold Coast, QLD, Australia

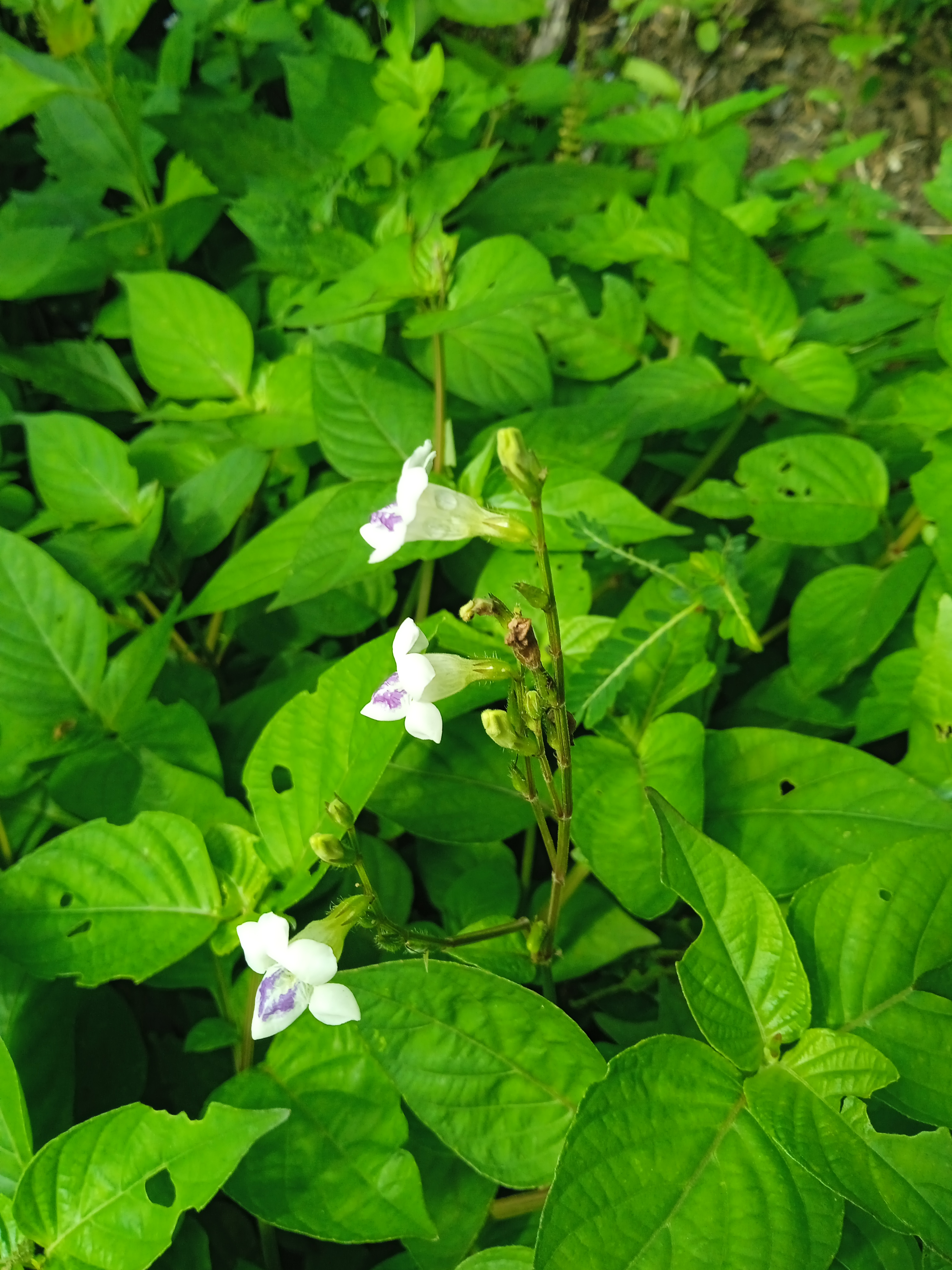
A. gangetica in Penang

A. gangetia in kerala
