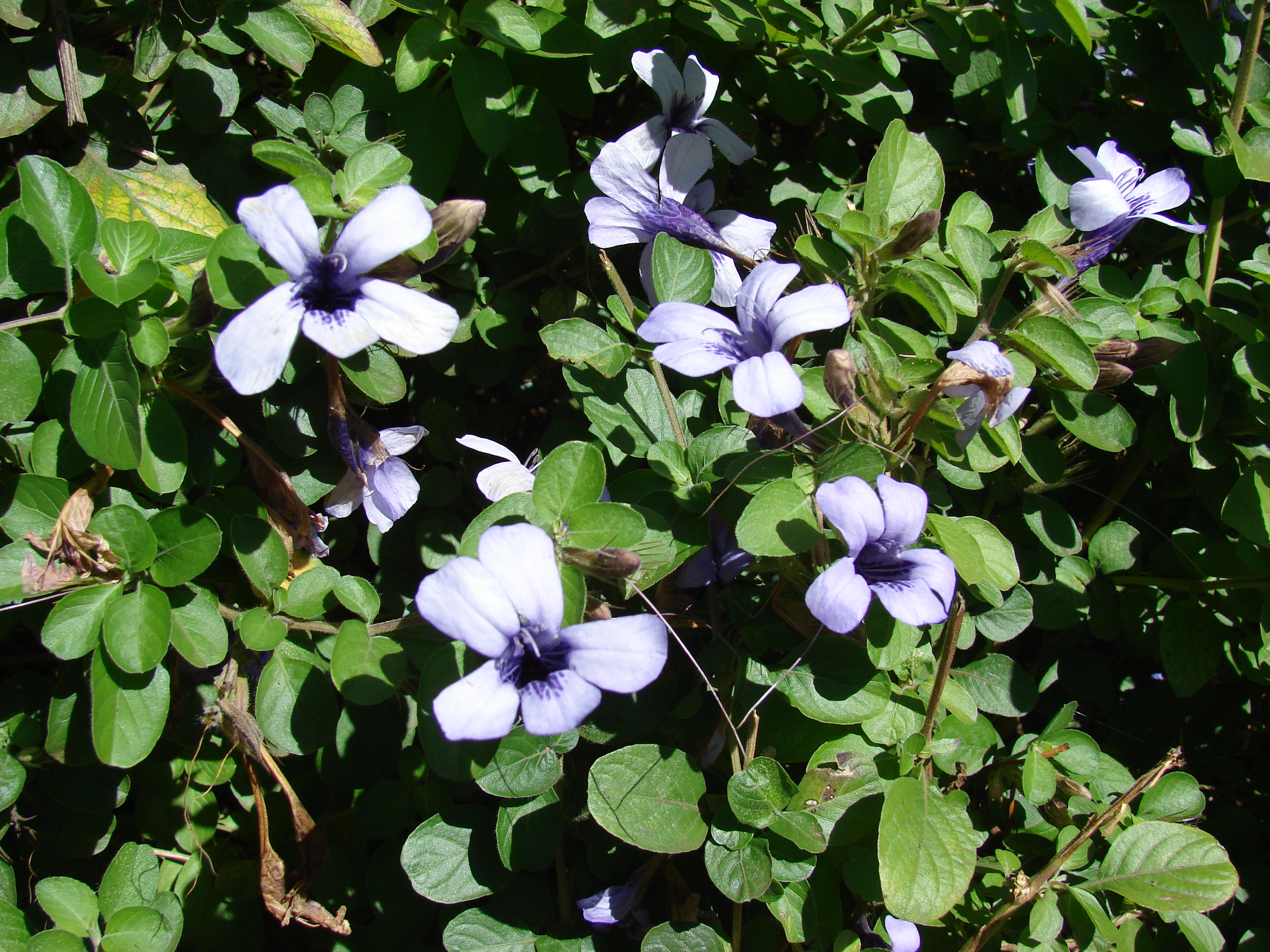
- Dyschoriste hygrophyloides

Scientific classification
- Kingdom: Plantae
- Clade: Tracheophytes
- Clade: Angiosperms
- Clade: Eudicots
- Clade: Asterids
- Order: Lamiales
- Family: Acanthaceae
- Tribe: Ruellieae
- Genus: Dyschoriste; Nees (1832)

Species
- 98; see text

Synonyms
- Apassalus Kobuski (1928); Calophanes D.Don (1833); Chaetacanthus Nees (1836); Homotropium Nees (1847); Linostylis Fenzl ex Sond. (1850); Phillipsia Rolfe (1895); Sautiera Decne. (1834)

= Dyschoriste =

Genus of flowering plants

Dyschoriste is a genus of flowering plants in the family Acanthaceae. It includes 98 species native to the tropics and subtropics of the Americas, sub-Saharan Africa, and southern Asia. Members of the genus are commonly known as snakeherb.

== Etymology ==
The name comes from the Greek δυσ, poorly, and χωριστός, to split, in reference to the slightly lobed stigma.

== Species ==
98 species are accepted.

- Dyschoriste albiflora Lindau
- Dyschoriste angusta (A.Gray) Small – Pineland snakeherb
- Dyschoriste angustifolia (Hemsl.) Kuntze
- Dyschoriste axillaris Wassh. & J.R.I.Wood
- Dyschoriste bayatensis (Urb.) Urb.
- Dyschoriste bayensis Thulin
- Dyschoriste boliviana Wassh. & J.R.I.Wood
- Dyschoriste burchellii (Nees) Kuntze
- Dyschoriste capitata (Oerst.) Kuntze
- Dyschoriste capricornis C.B.Clarke
- Dyschoriste celebica Bremek.
- Dyschoriste ciliata (Nees) Kuntze
- Dyschoriste cinerascens (Henrickson & Hilsenb.) T.F.Daniel
- Dyschoriste clarkei (Vatke) Benoist
- Dyschoriste costata (Nees) Kuntze
- Dyschoriste crenulata Kobuski – Wavyleaf snakeherb
- Dyschoriste cubensis Urb.
- Dyschoriste cunenensis C.B.Clarke
- Dyschoriste dalyi A.G.Mill.
- Dyschoriste decumbens (A.Gray) Kuntze – Spreading snakeherb
- Dyschoriste diffusa (Nees) Urb.
- Dyschoriste ecuadoriana Wassh.
- Dyschoriste erythrorhiza (Nees) Lindau
- Dyschoriste eulinae F.K.S.Monteiro & J.I.M.Melo
- Dyschoriste geniculata Nees
- Dyschoriste gracilicaulis (Benoist) Benoist
- Dyschoriste gracilis (Nees) Kuntze
- Dyschoriste greenmanii Kobuski
- Dyschoriste heudelotiana (Nees) Kuntze
- Dyschoriste hildebrandtii (S.Moore) Lindau ex O.B.Clarke
- Dyschoriste hirsuta (Oerst. ex Hiern) Kuntze
- Dyschoriste hirsutissima (Nees) Kuntze – Swamp snakeherb
- Dyschoriste hispidula (Baker) Benoist
- Dyschoriste humilis Lindau
- Dyschoriste humistrata (Michx.) Kuntze – Swamp snakeherb
- Dyschoriste hygrophiloides (Nees) Kuntze
- Dyschoriste jaliscensis Kobuski
- Dyschoriste keniensis Malombe, Mwachala & Vollesen
- Dyschoriste kitongaensis Vollesen
- Dyschoriste lavandulacea (Nees) Kuntze
- Dyschoriste linearis (Torr. & A.Gray) Kuntze – Narrowleaf snakeherb
- Dyschoriste lycioides Chiov.
- Dyschoriste madagascariensis (Nees) Kuntze
- Dyschoriste madurensis (Burm.f.) Kuntze
- Dyschoriste maranhonis (Nees) Kuntze
- Dyschoriste mcvaughii T.F.Daniel
- Dyschorite microphylla (Cav.) Kuntze
- Dyschoriste miskatensis Thulin
- Dyschoriste multicaulis (Hochst. ex A.Rich.) Kuntze
- Dyschoriste mutica (S.Moore) C.B.Clarke
- Dyschoriste nagchana (Nees) Bennet
- Dyschoriste novogaliciana T.F.Daniel
- Dyschoriste nummulifolia Chiov.
- Dyschoriste nyassica Gilli
- Dyschoriste oblongifolia (Michx.) Kuntze – Oblongleaf snakeherb
- Dyschoriste oligosperma (Steenis) Bremek.
- Dyschoriste ovata (Cav.) Kuntze
- Dyschoriste parvula (Alain & Leonard) Greuter & R.Rankin
- Dyschoriste pilifera Hutch.
- Dyschoriste pinetorum Kobuski
- Dyschoriste poliodes Leonard & Gentry
- Dyschoriste principis Benoist
- Dyschoriste pringlei Greenm.
- Dyschoriste prostrata Wassh. & J.R.I.Wood
- Dyschoriste pseuderecta Mildbr.
- Dyschoriste pulegium (Nees) Kuntze
- Dyschoriste purpusii Kobuski
- Dyschoriste quadrangularis (Oerst.) Kuntze
- Dyschoriste quitensis (Kunth) Kuntze
- Dyschoriste radicans Nees
- Dyschoriste repens (Nees) Kuntze
- Dyschoriste rosei Kobuski
- Dyschoriste rubiginosa Ramamoorthy & Wassh.
- Dyschoriste sagittata Kobuski
- Dyschoriste sallyae Vollesen
- Dyschoriste saltuensis Fernald
- Dyschoriste schiedeana (Nees) Kuntze
- Dyschoriste schottiana (Nees) Kobuski
- Dyschoriste serpyllifolia (Nees) Benoist
- Dyschoriste serpyllum (Nees) Kuntze
- Dyschoriste setigera (Pers.) Vollesen
- Dyschoriste siphonantha (Nees) Kuntze
- Dyschoriste smithii Leonard
- Dyschoriste subquadrangularis (Lindau) C.B.Clarke
- Dyschoriste tanganyikensis C.B.Clarke
- Dyschoriste tanzaniensis Vollesen
- Dyschoriste thunbergiiflora (S.Moore) Lindau
- Dyschoriste tinctorum (Decne.) E.A.Tripp & T.F.Daniel
- Dyschoriste trichanthera Kobuski
- Dyschoriste trichocalyx (Oliv.) Lindau
- Dyschoriste tubicalyx C.B.Clarke
- Dyschoriste tweedieana (Nees) Kuntze
- Dyschoriste vagans (Wight) Kuntze
- Dyschoriste venturii Leonard
- Dyschoriste vestita Benoist
- Dyschoriste vinacea F.K.S.Monteiro & J.I.M.Melo
- Dyschoriste xylopoda Kobuski
- Dyschoriste zambiana Vollesen
