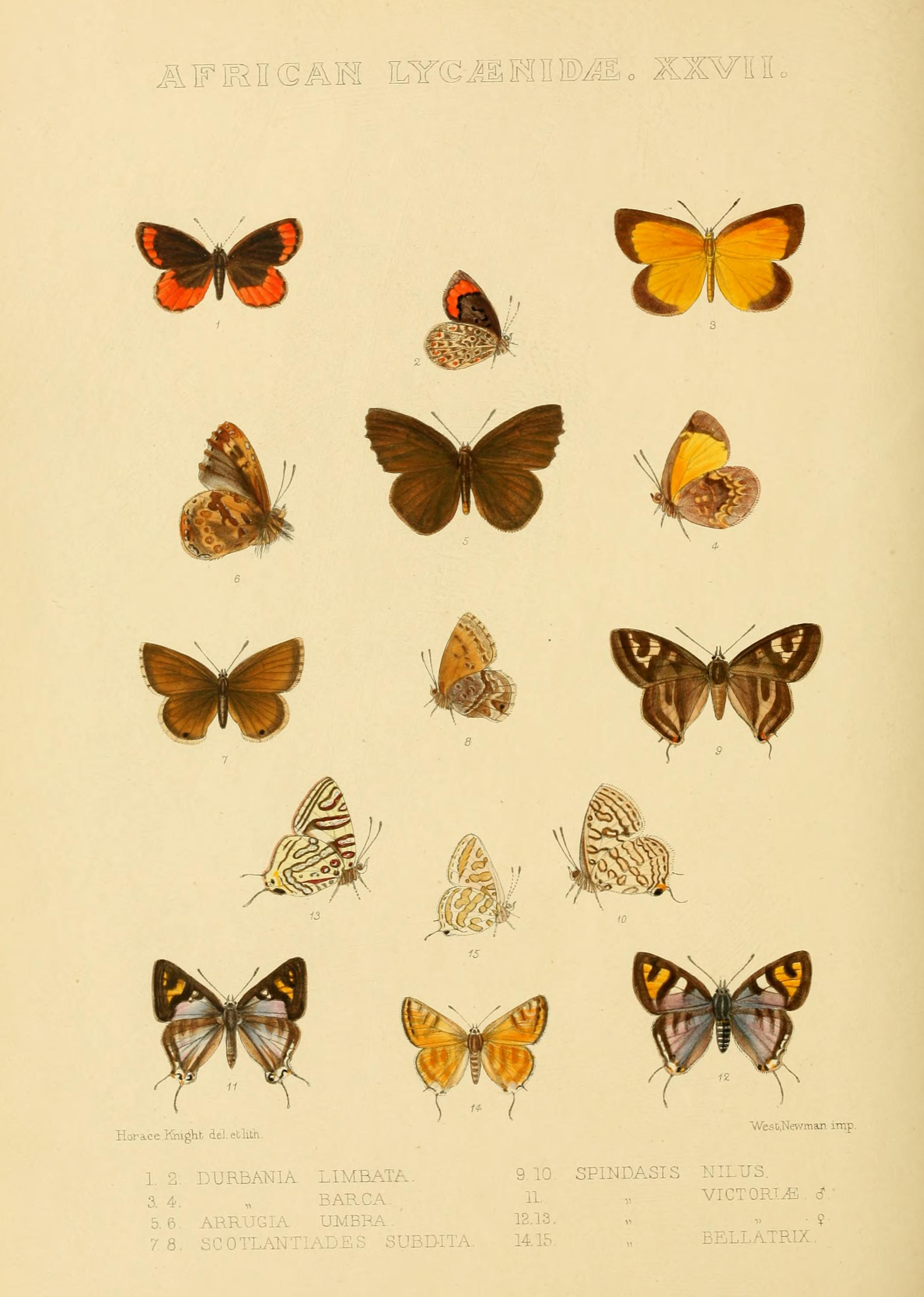
- Figures 1 and 2

Scientific classification
- Domain: Eukaryota
- Kingdom: Animalia
- Phylum: Arthropoda
- Class: Insecta
- Order: Lepidoptera
- Family: Lycaenidae
- Genus: Durbania
- Species: D. limbata

Binomial name
- Durbania limbata Trimen, 1887

Synonyms
- Durbania amabilis Staudinger, 1888

= Durbania limbata =

Species of butterfly

Durbania limbata, the Natal rocksitter, is a butterfly of the family Lycaenidae. It is found in grassland in the KwaZulu-Natal midlands, the north-eastern Free State and south-western Mpumalanga.

The wingspan is 22–27 mm for males and 24–33 mm for females. Adults are on wing from March to April. There is one generation per year.

The larvae feed on cyanobacteria species.
