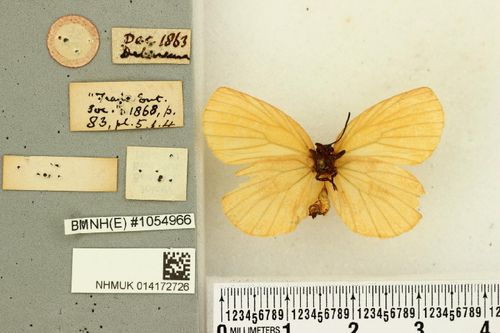
- One of the specimens kept in the Natural History Museum in London.

Conservation status
- Extinct (IUCN 3.1)

Scientific classification
- Kingdom: Animalia
- Phylum: Arthropoda
- Clade: Pancrustacea
- Class: Insecta
- Order: Lepidoptera
- Family: Lycaenidae
- Genus: Deloneura
- Species: †D. immaculata

Binomial name
- †Deloneura immaculata Trimen, 1868

= Deloneura immaculata =

Mbashe River buff

Species of butterfly

Deloneura immaculata, the Mbashe River buff, is a probably extinct species of butterfly in the family Lycaenidae. It is assumed to be (or to have been) endemic to the densely forested Mbhashe River area of the Eastern Cape, South Africa. Searches subsequent to its discovery a century and a half ago, however failed to yield any trace of it: as of 2018, the IUCN assessed the butterfly's status as "extinct."

Only three female specimens have ever been collected, all by Colonel James Henry Bowker, in 1863–64. The specimens are held in the South African Museum in Cape Town, and the Natural History Museum in London.
