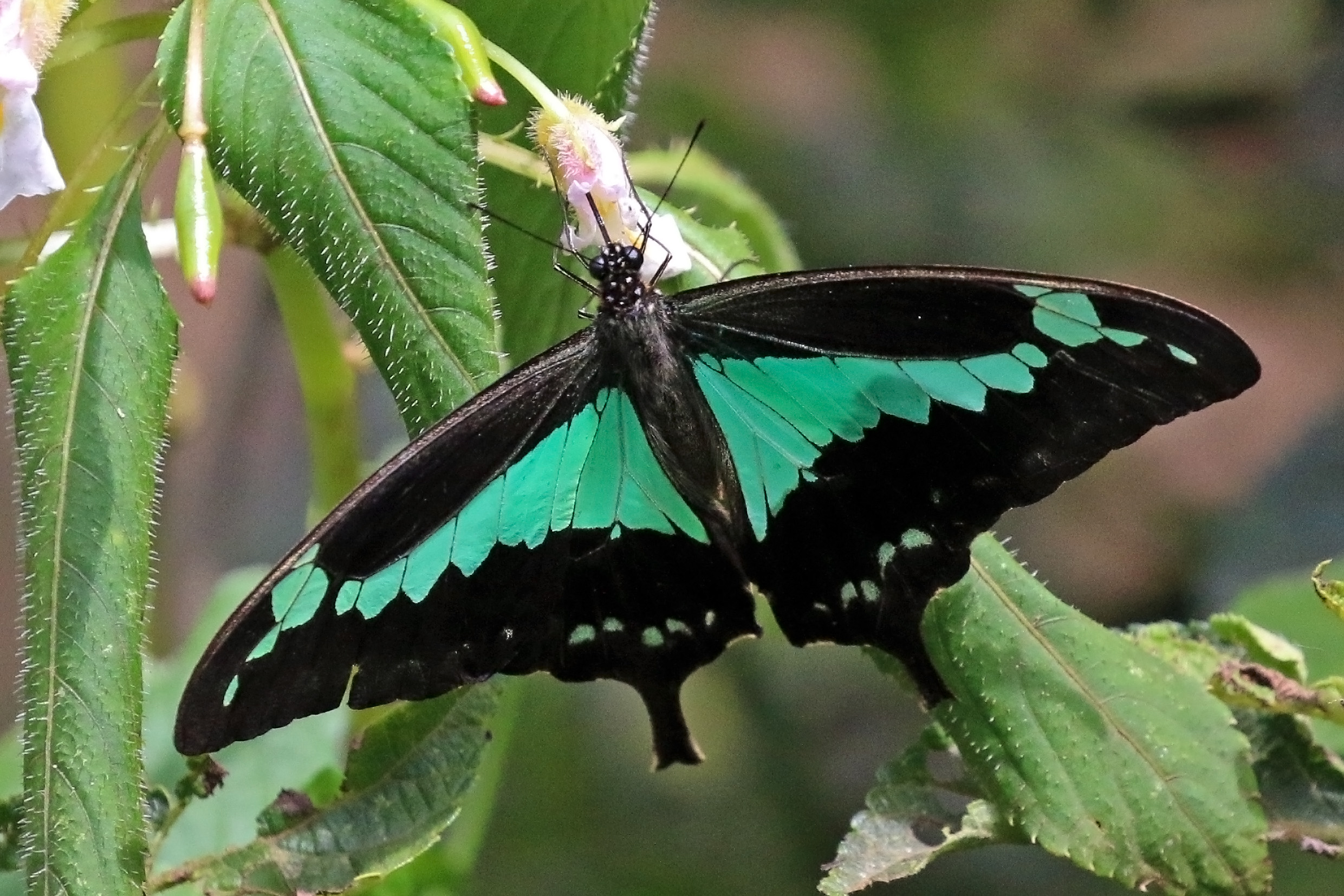

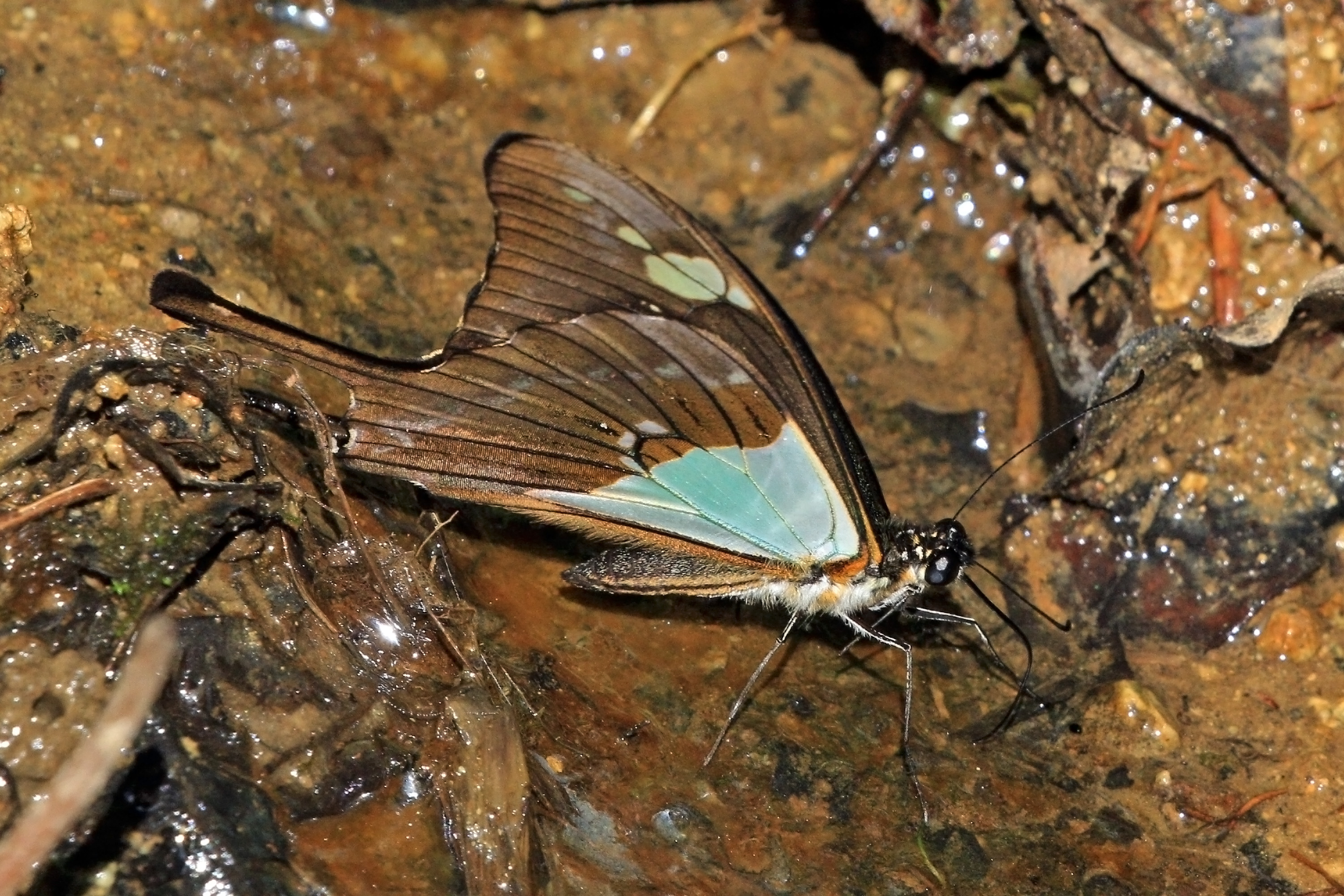
- both Kakamega Forest, Kenya

Scientific classification
- Kingdom: Animalia
- Phylum: Arthropoda
- Clade: Pancrustacea
- Class: Insecta
- Order: Lepidoptera
- Family: Papilionidae
- Genus: Papilio
- Species: P. phorcas

Binomial name
- Papilio phorcas Cramer, [1775]

Synonyms
- List: Princeps phorcas; Papilio doreus Fabricius, 1775; Papilio thersander Fabricius, 1793; Papilio phorcas f. media Le Cerf, 1924; Papilio nandina Rothschild & Jordan, 1901; Papilio phorcas tippelskirchi Suffert, 1904; Papilio phorcas f. thersandroides Aurivillius, 1908; Papilio phorcas bardamu f. velledae Canu, 1994; Papilio phorcas caspor Suffert, 1904; Papilio phorcas ab. kassaiensis Strand, 1916; Papilio phorcas f. bergeri Storace, 1955; Papilio phorcas f. xera Storace, 1955; Papilio phorcas f. viridissima Basquin & Turlin, 1986; Papilio phorcas congoanus f. ponzonii Sala, 1992; Papilio phorcas leopoldi Suffert, 1904; Papilio phorcas ab. phorcadius Strand, 1911; Papilio phorcas f. ruscoei Krüger, 1928; Papilio phorcas f. mutans Le Cerf, 1924; Papilio phorcas f. furcula Bryk, 1927; Papilio phorcas f. inexpectata Bryk, 1927; Papilio phorcas pseudothersander Krüger, 1937; Papilio phorcas f. polyxena Stoneham, 1951; Papilio phorcas f. bayoni Storace, 1955; Papilio phorcas nilotica Storace, 1961; Papilio phorcas tenuifasciatus f. meto Kielland, 1990

= Papilio phorcas =

Apple-green swallowtail

Species of butterfly

Papilio phorcas, the apple-green swallowtail or green-banded swallowtail, is a butterfly of the family Papilionidae. It is found in Africa.

The larvae feed on Teclea nobilis, Teclea simplicifolia, Macrostylis villosa, Vepris, Calodendrum, Clausena, Citrus, Fagara and Toddalia species.

== Description ==
A tailed species. The ground colour is black, with green markings.

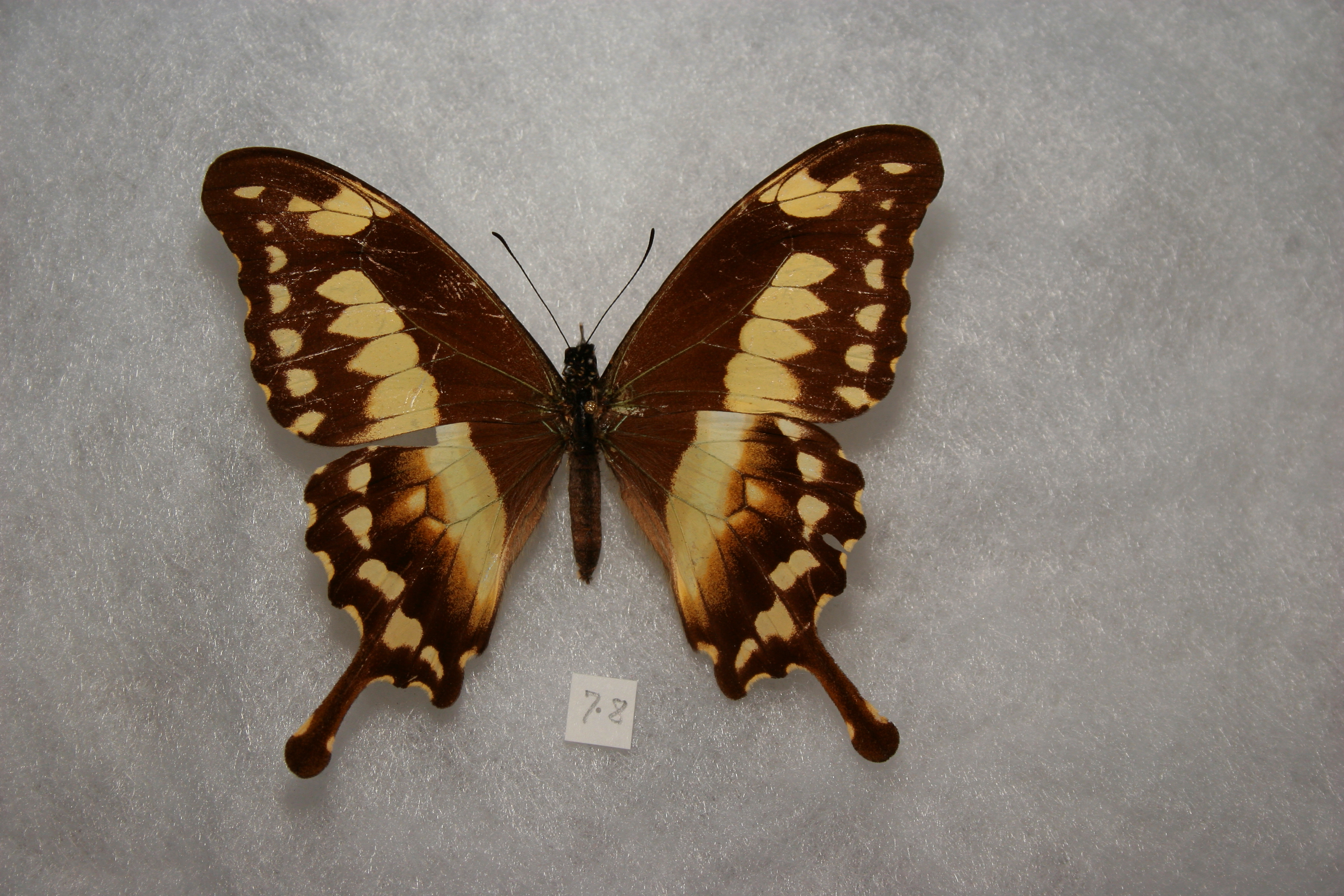
Female dorsal view

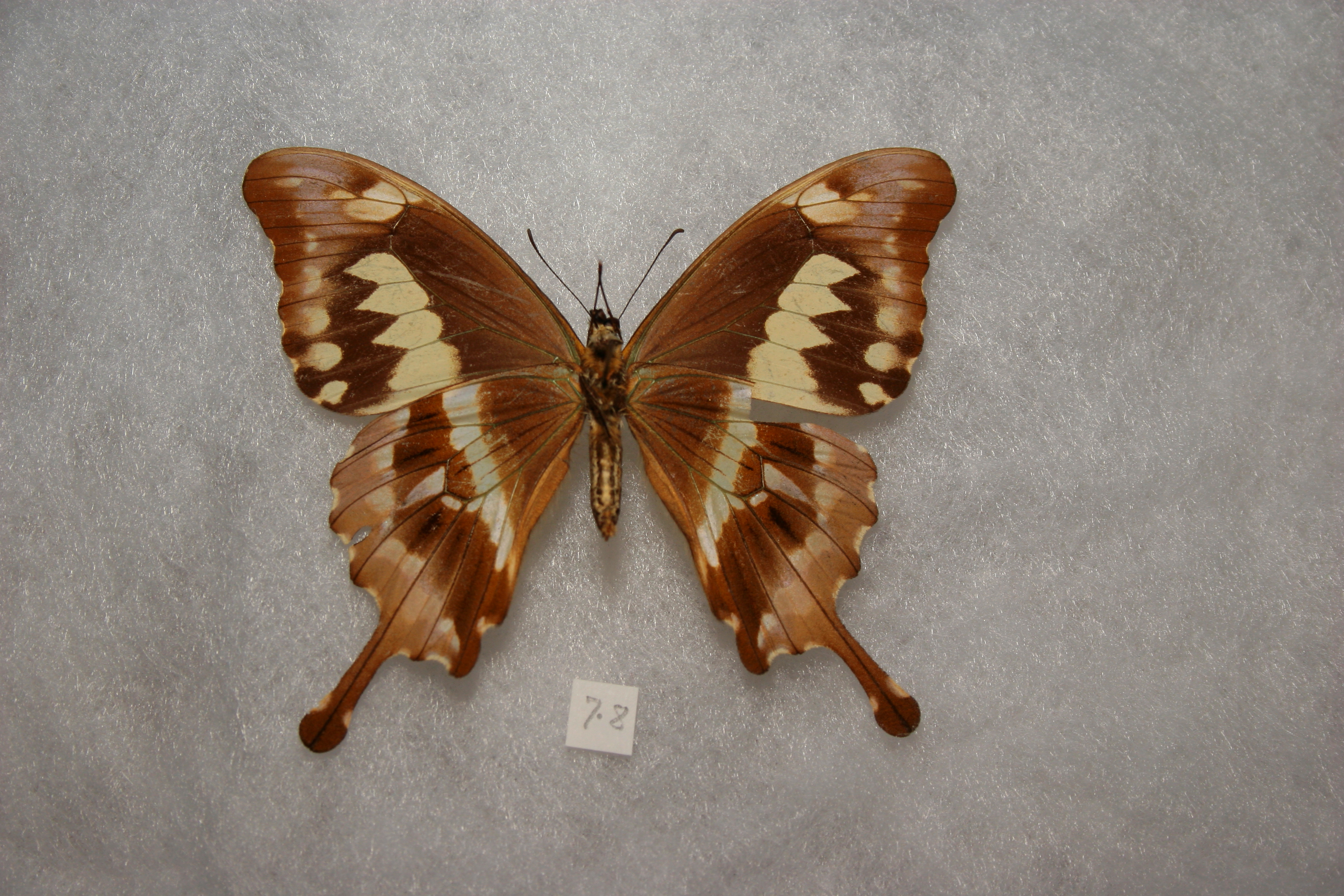
Same, ventral

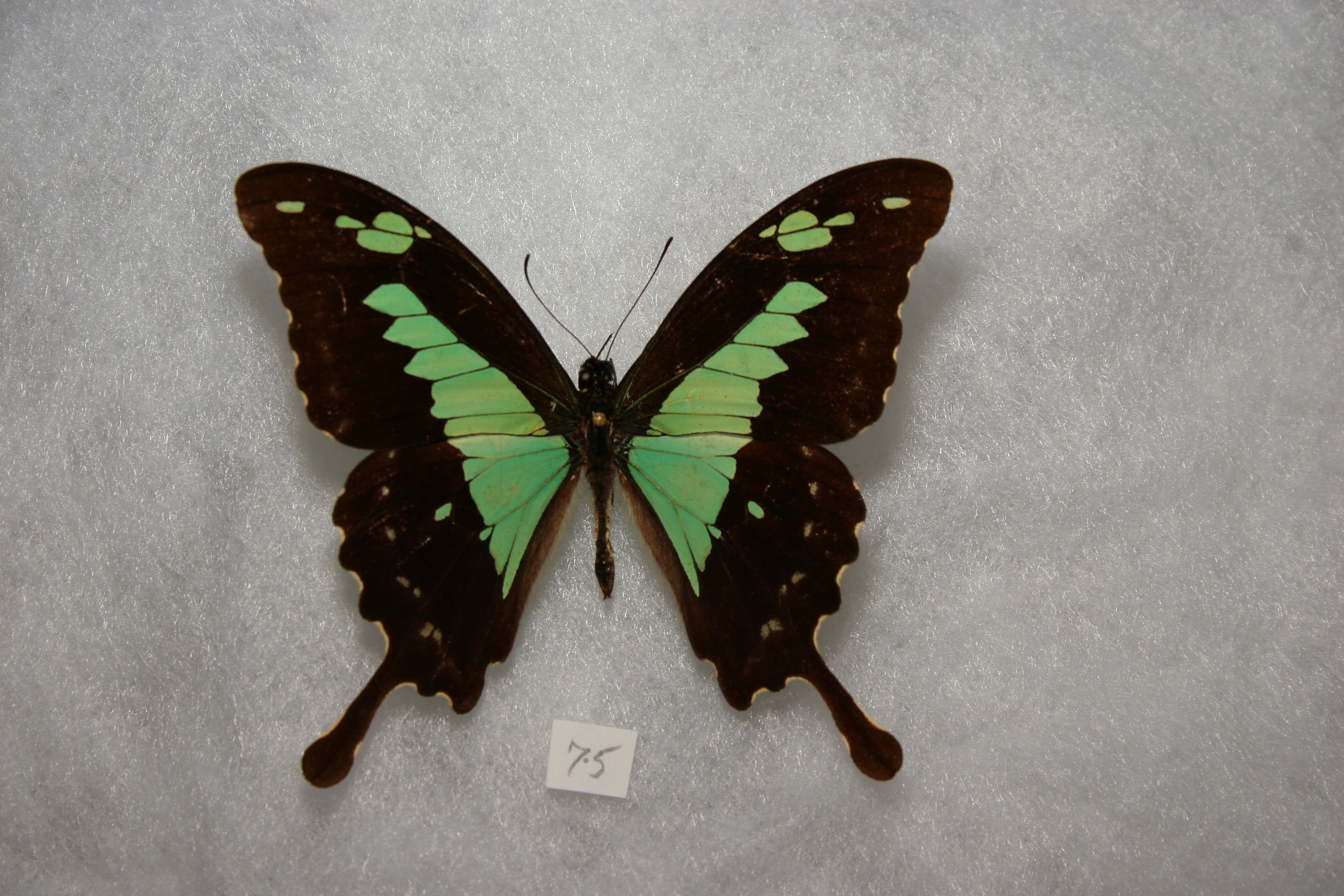
Male, dorsal

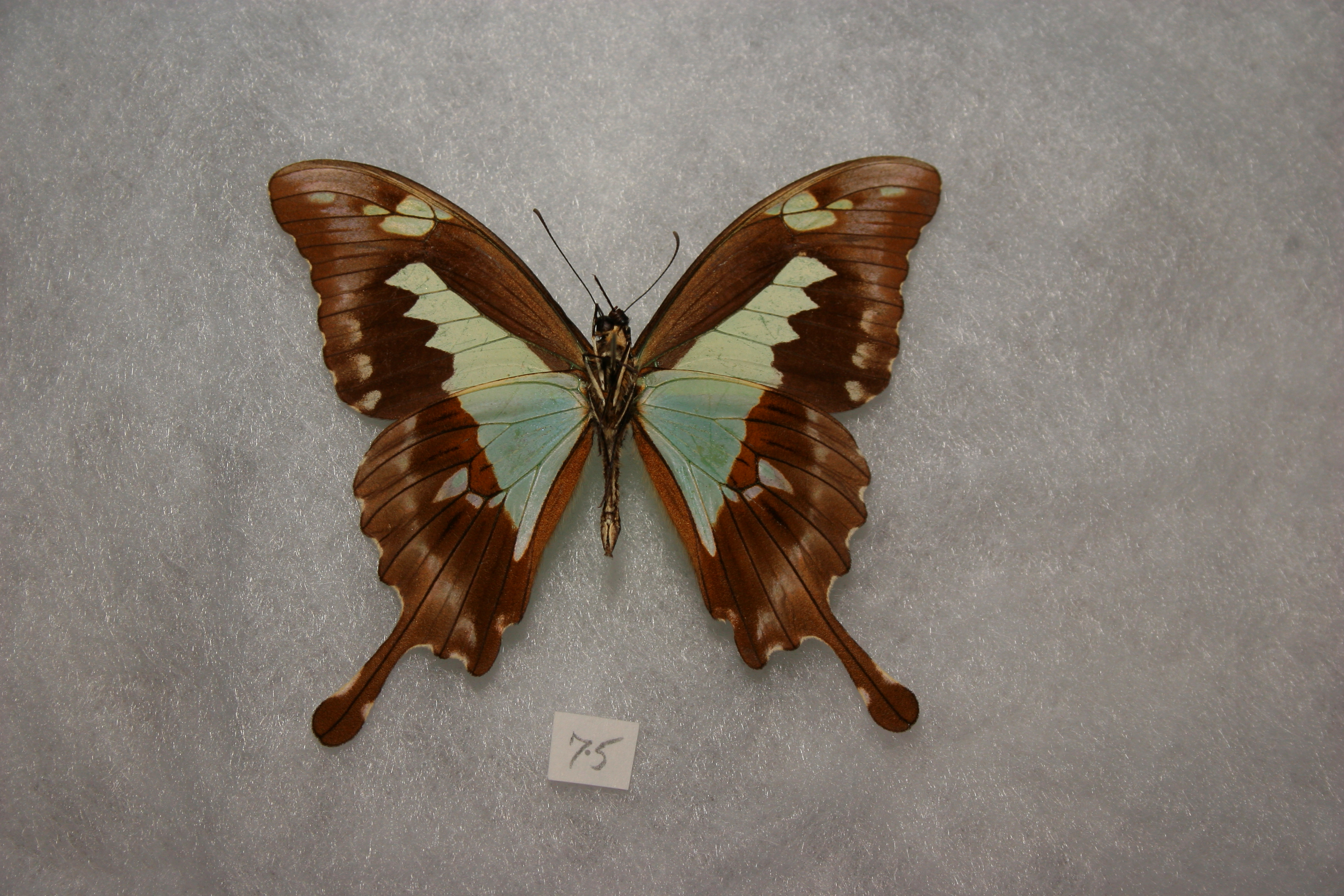
Same, ventral

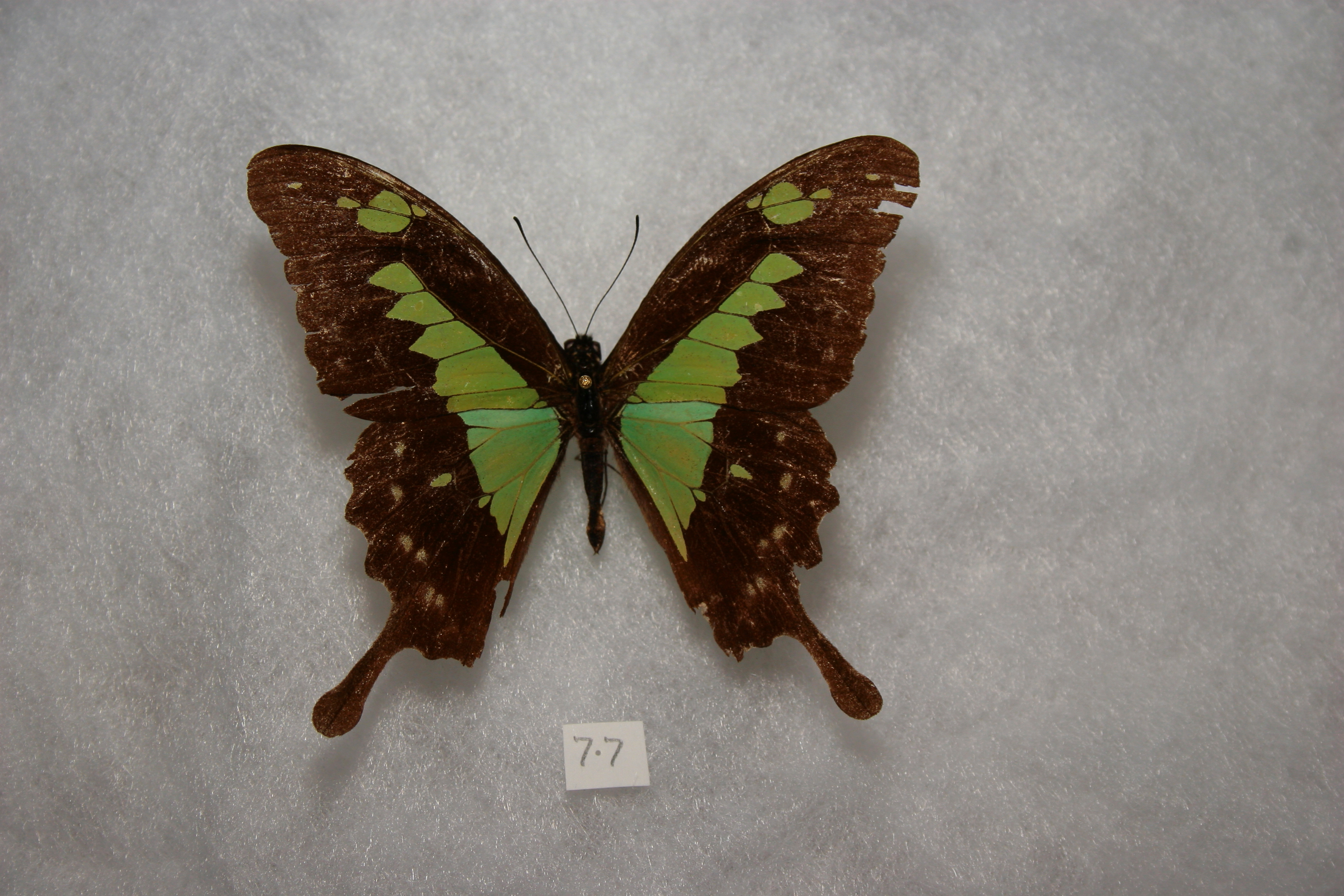
More green looking male

== Taxonomy ==
Papilio phorcas is a member of the dardanus species group. The members of the clade are:

- Papilio dardanus Brown, 1776
- Papilio constantinus Ward, 1871
- Papilio delalandei Godart, [1824]
- Papilio phorcas Cramer, [1775]
- Papilio rex Oberthür, 1886

== Subspecies ==
- P. p. phorcas (Guinea, Sierra Leone, Liberia, Ivory Coast, Ghana, Togo, Benin, Nigeria)
- P. p. ansorgei Rothschild, 1896. (Kenya (highland forest east of the Rift Valley))
- P. p. congoanus Rothschild, 1896 (Nigeria, Cameroon, Equatorial Guinea, Gabon, Congo, Central African Republic, northern Angola, Congo Republic, western Uganda, western Tanzania, northern Zambia)
- P. p. nyikanus Rothschild & Jordan, 1903 (highland forest of north-eastern Zambia, Malawi and eastern Tanzania)
- P. p. ruscoei Krüger, 1928 (eastern Uganda, Kenya (highlands west of the Rift Valley))
- P. p. sudanicola Storace, 1965 (southern Sudan)
- P. p. tenuifasciatus Kielland, 1990 (northern Tanzania, Kenya)
- P. p. bardamu Canu, 1994 (Bioko Island)

Torben Larsen developed a species numbering system for his 2005 publication Butterflies of West Africa. The nominate subspecies is #5. The 'Larsen' numbers have since been used with permission in A Sharp Eye on Butterflies of Ghana.

== Biogeographic realm ==
Afrotropical realm.
