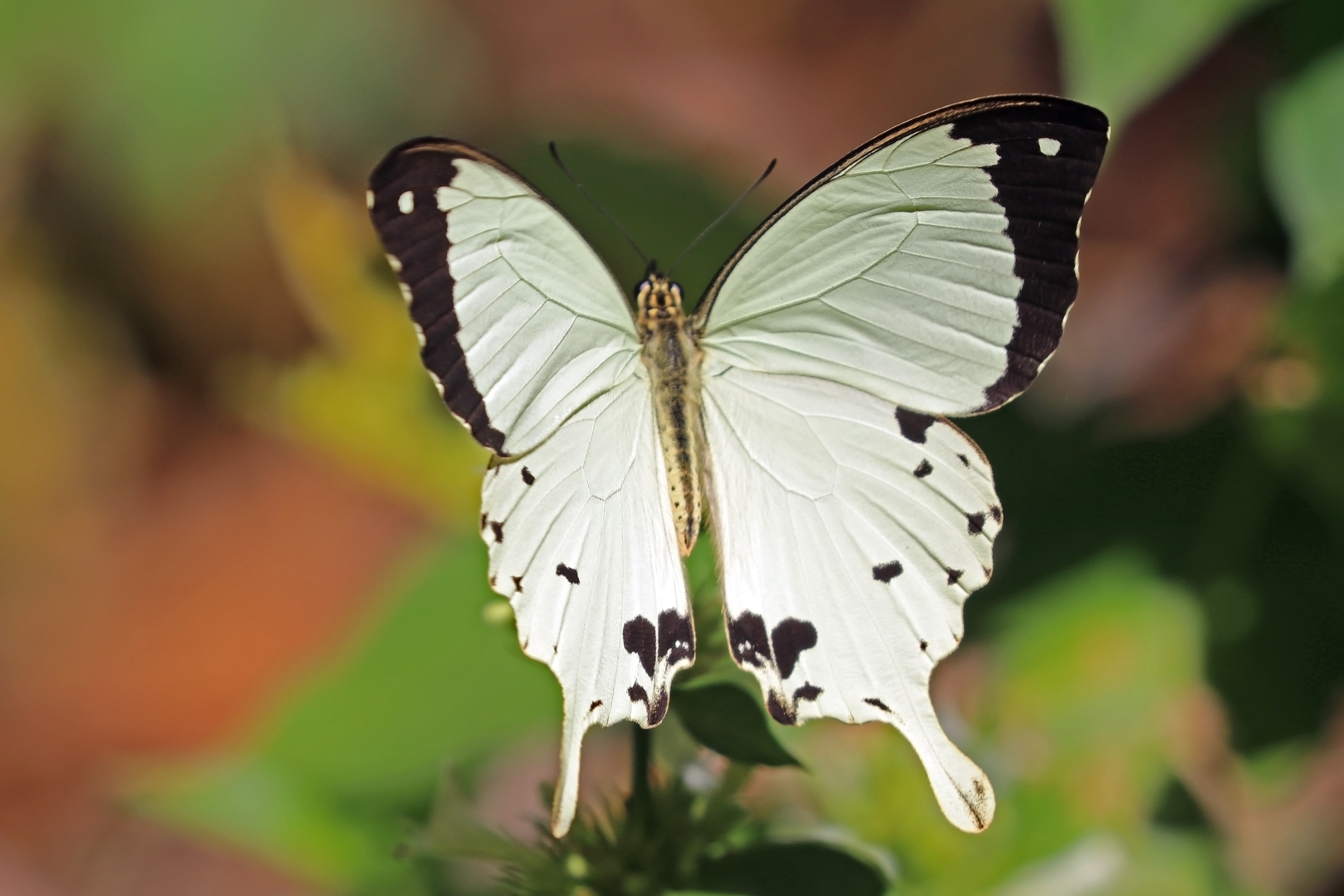

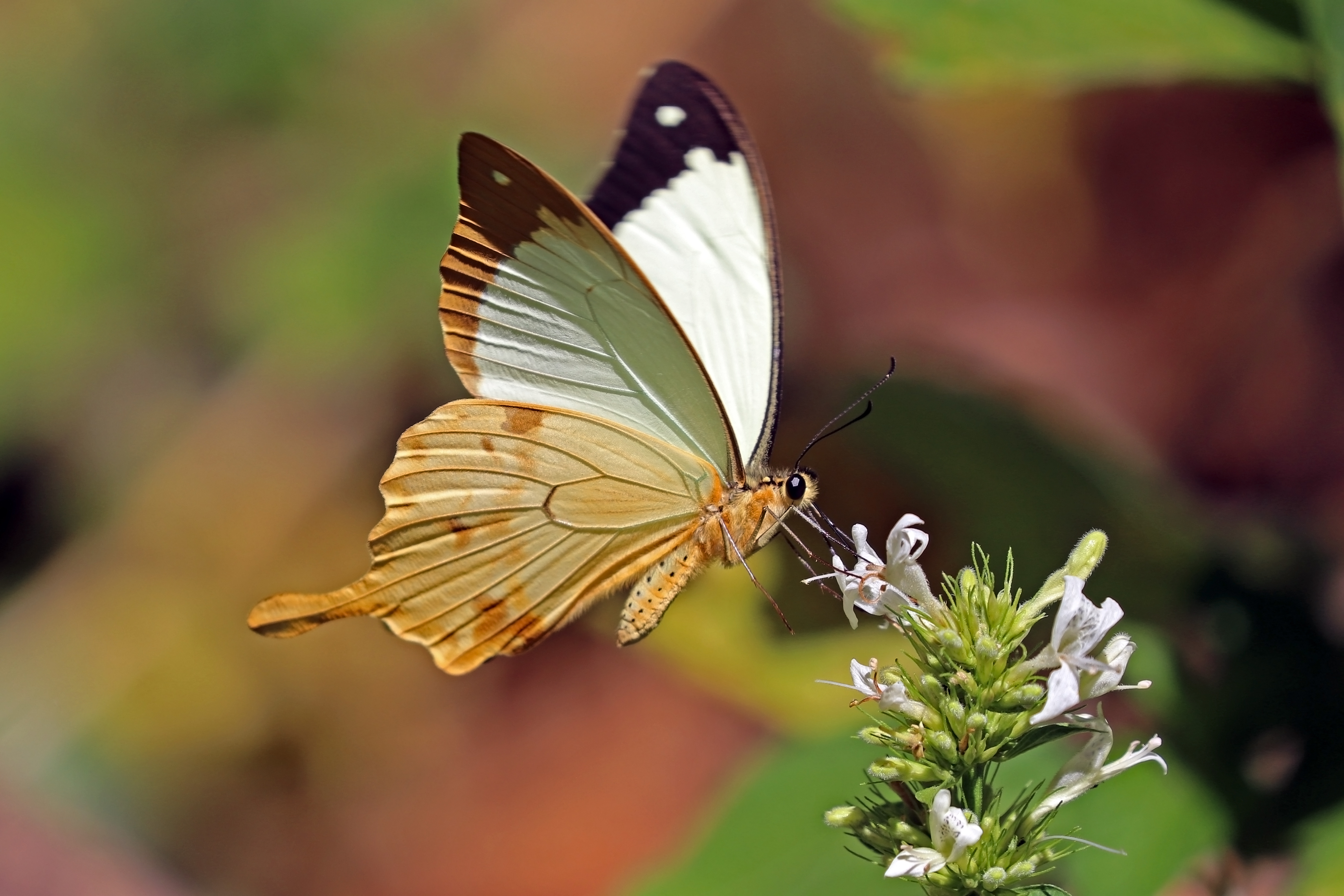
- both male P. d. antinorii, Ethiopia

Scientific classification
- Kingdom: Animalia
- Phylum: Arthropoda
- Clade: Pancrustacea
- Class: Insecta
- Order: Lepidoptera
- Family: Papilionidae
- Genus: Papilio
- Species: P. dardanus

Binomial name
- Papilio dardanus Brown, 1776

Subspecies
- See text

Synonyms
- List: Papilio merope Cramer, 1777; Papilio brutus Fabricius, 1781; Papilio hippocoon Fabricius, 1793; Papilio westermannii Boisduval, 1836; Papilio trophonius Westwood, 1842; Papilio dionysos Doubleday, 1846; Papilio dardanus ab. niobe Aurivillius, 1899; Papilio dardanus ab. nioboides Aurivillius, 1899; Papilio dardanus heimsi Suffert, 1904; Papilio dardanus benio Suffert, 1904; Papilio dardanus f. trophonissa Aurivillius, 1907; Papilio dardanus polytrophus f. alluaudi Boullet & Le Cerf, 1912; Papilio f. latemarginatus Schultze, 1913; Papilio dardanus f. sirius Reuss, 1921; Papilio dardanus ab. crocotus Poulton, 1923; Papilio dardanus f. ceneispila Le Cerf, 1924; Papilio dardanus f. fagerskioldi Bryk, 1928; Papilio dardanus dardanus ab. punctata Dufrane, 1933; Papilio dardanus dardanus ab. divisa Dufrane, 1933; Papilio dardanus dardanus ab. bipunctata Dufrane, 1933; Papilio dardanus dardanus ab. paradoxa Dufrane, 1946; Papilio dardanus dardanus f. completa Dufrane, 1946; Papilio dardanus dardanus f. subpunctata Dufrane, 1946; Papilio dardanus dardanus f. dawanti Dufrane, 1946; Papilio dardanus dardanus f. impunctata Dufrane, 1946; Papilio dardanus dardanus f. jottrandi Dufrane, 1946; Papilio dardanus dardanus f. extrema Dufrane, 1946; Papilio dardanus f. semimelas Basquin & Turlin, 1986; Papilio dardanus ab. obscura McLeod & McLeod, 2004; Papilio antinorii Oberthür, 1883; Papilio antinorii ab. niavioides Kheil, 1890; Papilio antinorii ab. ruspinae Kheil, 1890; Papilio dardanus antinorii var. niavina Haase, 1891; Papilio dardanus antinorii var. alticola Boullet & Le Cerf, 1912; Papilio dardanus hodsoni Poulton, 1926; Papilio dardanus hodsoni f. weinholti Poulton, 1927; Papilio dardanus f. zaoditou Ungemach, 1932; Papilio dardanus antinorii f. alameitu Gabriel, 1949; Papilio dardanus f. conjunctiflava Stoneham, 1951; Papilio dardanus antinorii ab. seriata Storace, 1963; Papilio dardanus antinorii morph immaculata Mollet, 1975; Papilio dardanus antinorii morph extensinigra Mollet, 1975; Papilio dardanus antinorii morph obsoleta Mollet, 1975; Papilio dardanus antinorii morph ornata Mollet, 1975; Papilio dardanus antinorii morph rufomaculata Mollet, 1975; Papilio dardanus antinorii morph aurantiaca Mollet, 1975; Papilio dardanus antinorii morph aperta Mollet, 1975; Papilio dardanus antinorii morph depuncta Mollet, 1975; Papilio dardanus antinorii morph obscura Mollet, 1975; Papilio dardanus antinorii morph parvicaudata Mollet, 1975; Papilio dardanus antinorii morph cenaeoides Mollet, 1975; Papilio dardanus antinorii morph streckerioides Mollet, 1975; Papilio dardanus antinorii morph lambornieoides Mollet, 1975; Papilio dardanus antinorii morph niobeoides Mollet, 1975; Papilio dardanus antinorii morph salaamioides Mollet, 1975; Papilio cenea Stoll, 1790; Danais rechila Godart, 1819; Papilio cephonius Hopffer, 1866; Papilio merpoe tibullus var. hippocoonides Haase, 1891; Papilio cenea acene Suffert, 1904; Papilio dardanus f. leighi Poulton, 1912; Papilio dardanus cenea f. radiata Reuss, 1921; Papilio dardanus cenea f. natalica Le Cerf, 1924; Papilio dardanus cenea f. hypolimnides Le Cerf, 1924; Papilio dardanus cenea f. extensiflava Le Cerf, 1924; Papilio dardanus cenea f. sylvicola van Son, 1949; Papilio dardanus cenea f. neocenea Stoneham, 1951; Papilio dardanus cenea f. nigricans Storace, 1955; Papilio dardanus cenea f. transiens Storace, 1955; Papilio dardanus cenea f. aikeni van Son, 1956; Papilio dardanus cenea f. infuscata van Son, 1956; Papilio dardanus antinorii f. vaccaroi Storace, 1947; Papilio dardanus antinorii f. protoniavioides Storace, 1962; Papilio dardanus figinii f. protomima Storace, 1962; Papilio humbloti Oberthür, 1888; Papilio meriones Felder & Felder, 1865; Papilio dardanus-meriones f. palaeotypus Le Cerf, 1924; Papilio merope f. planemoides Trimen, 1904; Papilio dardanus f. dionysoides Aurivillius, 1907; Papilio dardanus f. pemtolipus Aurivillius, 1907; Papilio dardanus f. mixtus Aurivillius, 1907; Papilio dardanus f. acenides Le Cerf, 1924; Papilio dardanus f. swynnertoni Poulton, 1929; Papilio dardanus f. carpenteri Poulton, 1929; Papilio dardanus f. xanthocaudatus Stoneham, 1932; Papilio dardanus f. hippocoonatus Stoneham, 1933; Papilio dardanus f. dominicanoides Stoneham, 1933; Papilio dardanus f. planematus Stoneham, 1934; Papilio dardanus f. epiplanemoides Stoneham, 1934; Papilio dardanus xanthocaudatus f. briani Stoneham, 1944; Papilio dardanus ochracea Carpenter, 1948; Papilio dardanus cenea ochracea f. ochracea Poulton, 1924; Papilio dardanus ochracea f. atavica Storace, 1955; Papilio nandina Rothschild & Jordan, 1901; Papilio dardanus tibullus f. dorippoides Trimen, 1909; Papilio dardanus f. speciosa Le Cerf, 1912; Papilio dardanus f. jeanneli Le Cerf, 1912; Papilio dardanus var. polytrophus f. punctimargo Le Cerf, 1912; Papilio dardanus polytrophus f. hippocooninus Reuss, 1921; Papilio dardanus polytrophus f. albescens Reuss, 1921; Papilio dardanus polytrophus f. nigrescens Reuss, 1921; Papilio dardanus polytrophus f. acenoides Reuss, 1921; Papilio dardanus polytrophus f. trophonoides Reuss, 1921; Papilio dardanus polytrophus f. mixtoides Reuss, 1921; Papilio dardanus var. polytrophus f. protocenea Bryk & Peebles, 1932; Papilio dardanus var. polytrophus f. astarte Bryk & Peebles, 1932; Papilio dardanus f. nairobianus Stoneham, 1932; Papilio dardanus f. poultoni Ford, 1936; Papilio dardanus nairobianus f. akechia Stoneham, 1951; Papilio dardanus nairobianus f. neria Stoneham, 1951; Papilio dardanus f. millari Stoneham, 1951; Papilio dardanus f. babingtonia Stoneham, 1951; Papilio dardanus nairobianus f. akechiana Stoneham, 1951; Papilio dardanus nairobianus f. neriana Stoneham, 1951; Papilio dardanus f. harmonia Stoneham, 1951; Papilio dardanus f. ariadne Stoneham, 1951; Papilio sulfurea Palisot de Beauvois, 1806; Papilio dardanus storacei Gauthier, 1984; Papilio dardanus sulphureus Bernardi, Pierre & Nguyen, 1985; Papilio tibullus Kirby, 1880; Papilio cenea maculatus Suffert, 1904; Papilio cenea discopunctatus Suffert, 1904; Papilio cenea salaami Suffert, 1904; Papilio boosi Suffert, 1904; Papilio dardanus f. trimeni Poulton, 1906; Papilio dardanus var. tibullus ab. gomia Strand, 1911; Papilio dardanus tibullus f. lamborni Poulton, 1918; Papilio dardanus f. mombasicus Stoneham, 1951; Papilio dardanus f. melanoleuca Stoneham, 1951

= Papilio dardanus =

Species of butterfly

Papilio dardanus, the Saharan swallowtail, African swallowtail, mocker swallowtail or flying handkerchief, is a species of butterfly in the family Papilionidae (the swallowtails). The species is broadly distributed throughout Sub-Saharan Africa. The British entomologist E. B. Poulton described it as "the most interesting butterfly in the world".

== Classification ==
Molecular studies have provided evidence that this species' closest relative is Papilio phorcas, with Papilio constantinus being the next closest (see images below). It is a member of the Papilio genus of which Papilio appalachiensis and Papilio xuthus are also members.

Papilio dardanus is the nominal member of the dardanus species group. The members of the clade are:

- Papilio dardanus Brown, 1776
- Papilio constantinus Ward, 1871
- Papilio delalandei Godart, [1824]
- Papilio phorcas Cramer, [1775]
- Papilio rex Oberthür, 1886

== Subspecies ==
Listed alphabetically:

- P. d. antinorii Oberthür, 1883 (highlands of Ethiopia)
- P. d. byatti Poulton, 1926 (northern highlands of Somalia)
- P. d. cenea Stoll, [1790] (southern Mozambique, eastern Zimbabwe, Botswana, South Africa, Eswatini)
- P. d. dardanus Brown, 1776 (Senegal, Guinea Bissau, Guinea, Sierra Leone, Liberia, Ivory Coast, Ghana, Burkina Faso, Togo, Benin, Nigeria, Cameroon, Equatorial Guinea, Gabon, Congo, Central African Republic, Angola, Democratic Republic of Congo, Uganda, western Kenya, northern Zambia)
- P. d. figinii Storace, 1962 (highlands of Eritrea)
- P. d. flavicornis Carpenter, 1947 (Mt Kulal, north-western Kenya)
- P. d. humbloti Oberthür, 1888 (Comoro Islands)
- P. d. meriones C. & R. Felder, 1865 (Madagascar)
- P. d. meseres Carpenter, 1948 (Uganda, south-western Kenya, Tanzania: the western, southern and south-eastern shores of Lake Victoria)
- P. d. ochraceana Vane-Wright 1995 (Mt. Marsabit, northern Kenya)
- P. d. polytrophus Rothschild & Jordan, 1903 (Kenya: highlands east of the Rift Valley)
- P. d. sulfurea Palisot de Beauvois, 1806 (São Tomé and Príncipe, Bioko)
- P. d. tibullus Kirby, 1880 (eastern Kenya, eastern Tanzania, Malawi, Zambia)

Torben Larsen developed a species numbering system for his 2005 publication Butterflies of West Africa. The nominate subspecies is #3. The 'Larsen' numbers have since been used with permission in A Sharp Eye on Butterflies of Ghana.

== Biogeographic realm ==
Afrotropical realm

== Mimicry ==
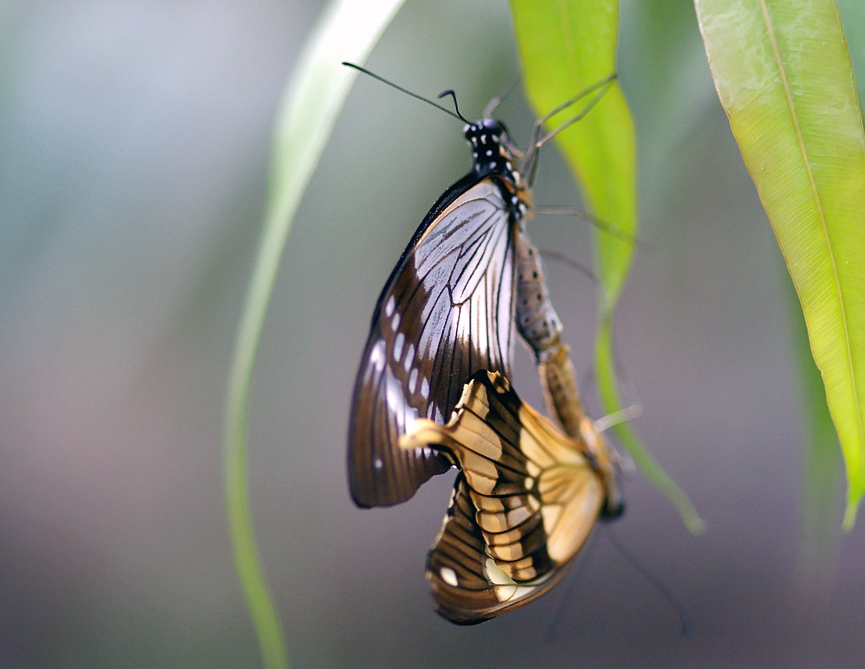
Mating

The species shows polymorphism in wing appearance, though this is limited to females, which are often given as an example of Batesian mimicry in insects. This female-limited mimicry was first described in 1869 by Roland Trimen. Males have a more or less uniform appearance throughout the species' range, but females come in at least 14 varieties or morphs.

Some female morphs share a very similar pattern of colouration with various species of distasteful butterfly (e.g. from the Danainae, a subfamily of nymphalids), while others have been found that mimic male appearance (andromorphs). The persistence of these various morphs or different types of females may be explained by frequency-dependent selection. Cook et al. suggest that Batesian mimics gain a fitness advantage by avoiding predators, but suffer harassment from males (see sexual conflict), whereas andromorphs (male mimics) are vulnerable to predation but are not harassed by male mating attempts.

Morphs are divided into three general groups based on patterning: the hippocoon group, the cenea group, and the planemoides group. The hippocoon group holds the largest amount of morphs; phenotypes within this group are characterized by four bands of alternating black and color patterns. Within the cenea group patterns are greatly dominated by black coloration and contain small splotches of color. The planemoides group has black bands surrounding the outside of the wing with a large splotch of color through the middle of the wing. This group also contains the female forms that are male-like mimics. Diversity in the wing patterns of each group is seen mostly in the coloration of each organism, while black patterns are generally consistent in each morph.

Phenotypic variation within the female morphs of Papilio dardanus has been found to be controlled at one locus named H that contains at least 11 different alleles. Recent studies have narrowed down the region of H to approximately 24 genes that is centered around the engrailed (en) gene which codes for specific transcription factors. The engrailed site has been found to have non-synonymous mutations throughout individuals in the species which would allow the divergence of each morph. Studies support that the engrailed gene in Papilio dardanus is monophyletic and has only evolved once within the species. Findings also suggest that the many different mimetic alleles in the Papilio dardanus genome are solely from mutations in the species. In other words, alleles did not enter into the genome from genetic transfer from other species.

Different combinations of the alleles at H lead to the variety of forms seen within the species. Genetic crosses of individuals found a general dominance hierarchy within the alleles. Allele combinations also determine not only which morph will be expressed but the actual size of the patterns shown. Each allele is able to either influence a larger or smaller mimetic pattern in an organism.

Such female-limited Batesian mimicry is not unique to this species, even in the genus Papilio. For instance Papilio memnon shows a similar case of polymorphism in females. Similarly, male mimicry has been observed in another insect, a damselfly Ischnura ramburii which also appears to have evolved camouflage to avoid sexual coercion by males.

== Gallery ==
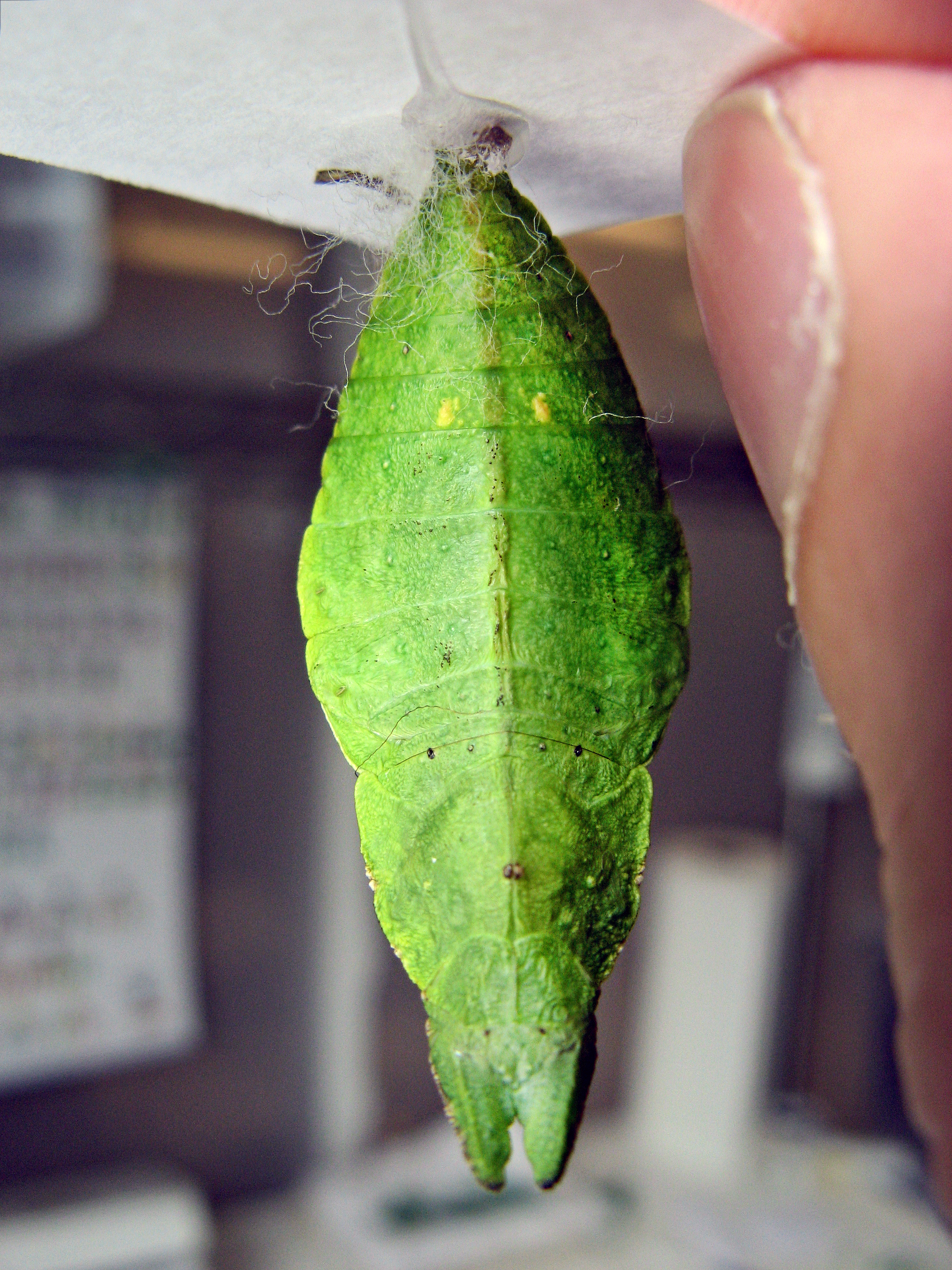
Chrysalis

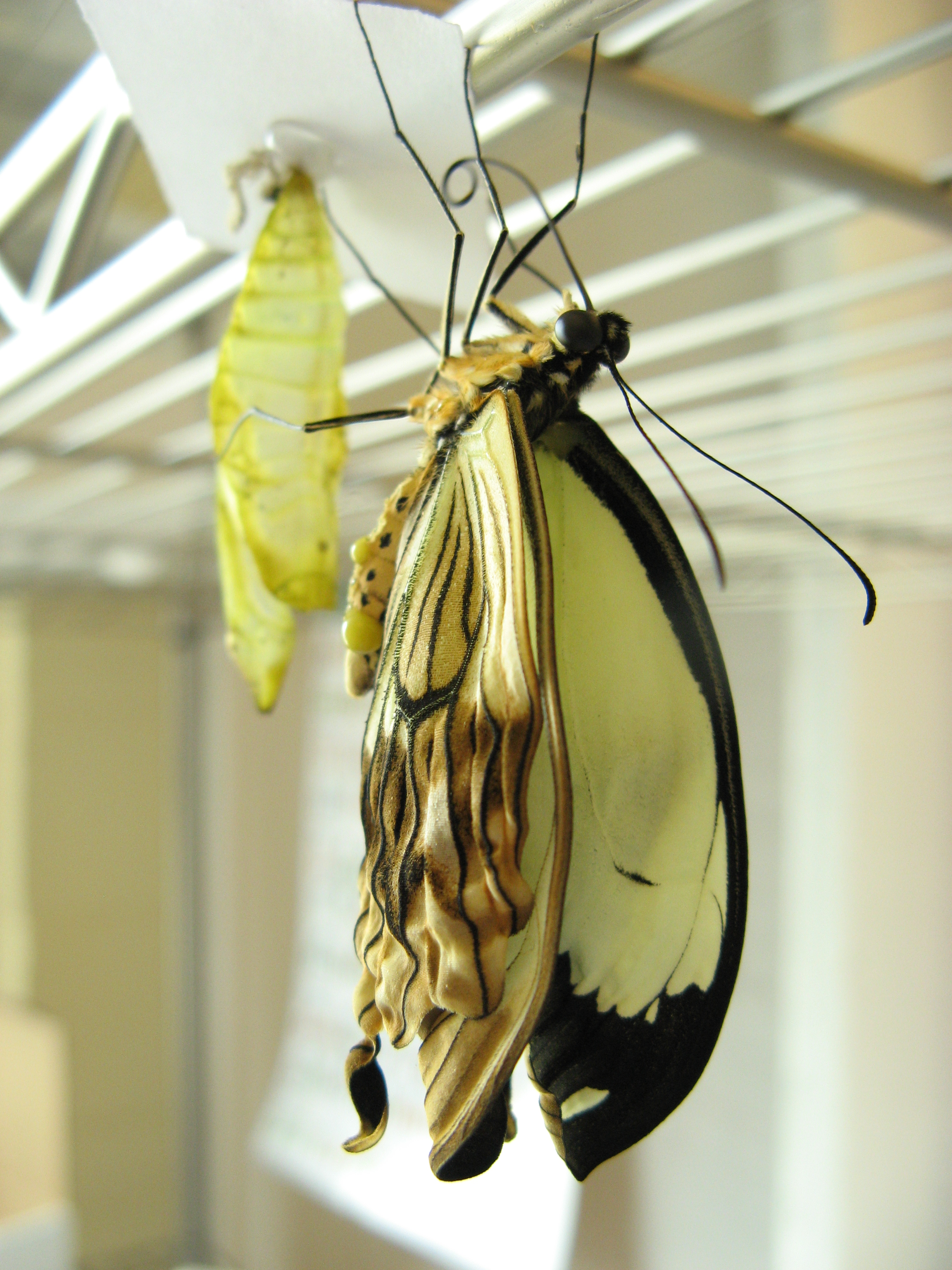
Emerging from chrysalis

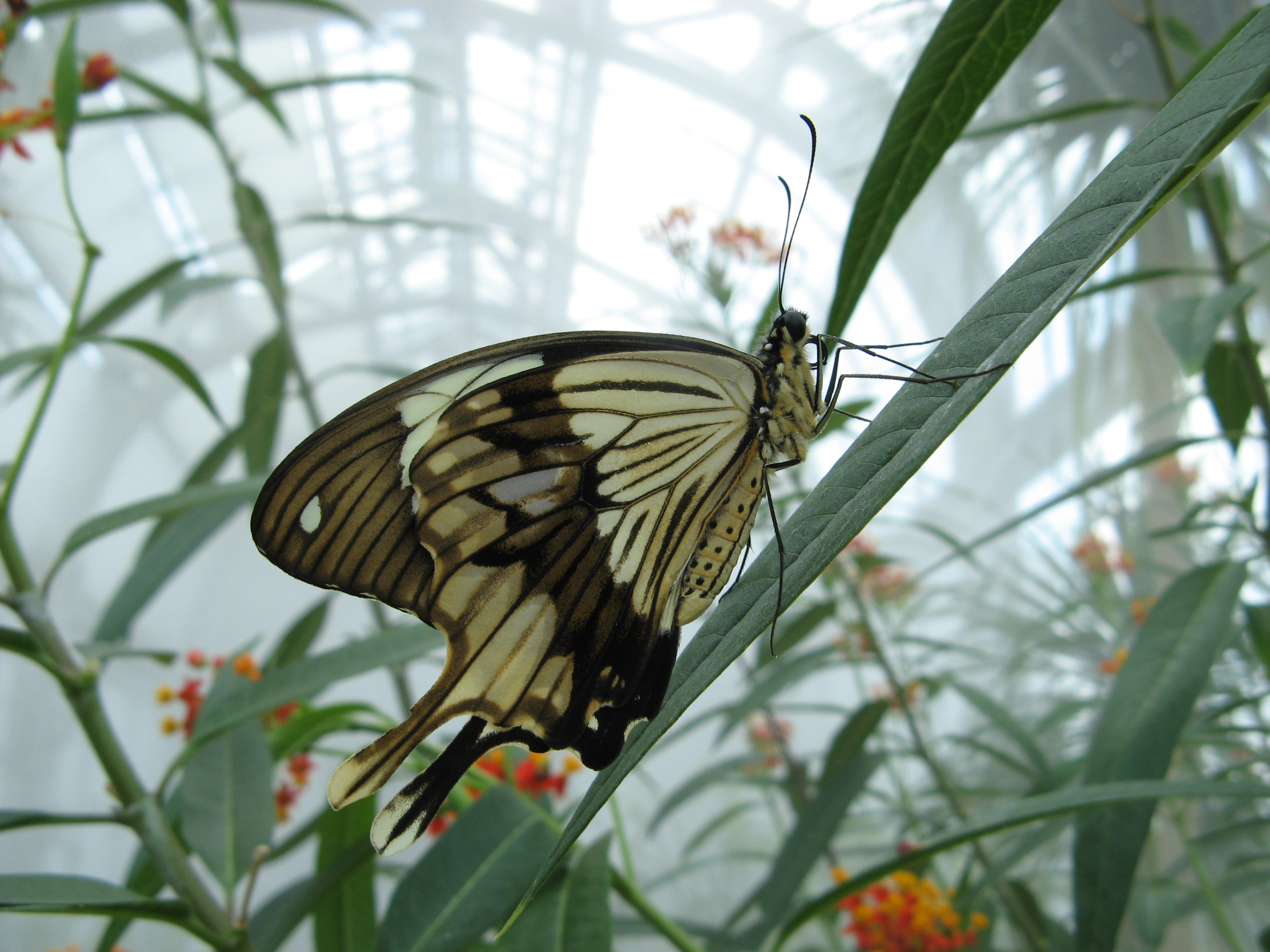
Adult

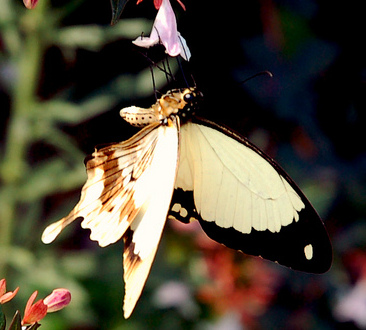
In the wild, South Africa

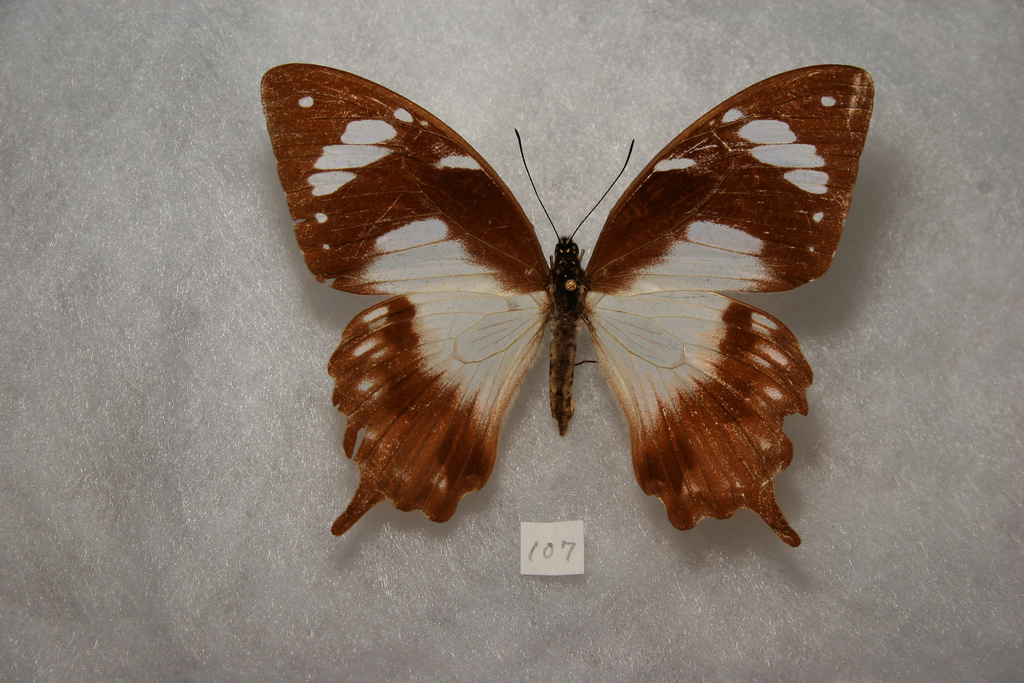
P. d. antinorii female

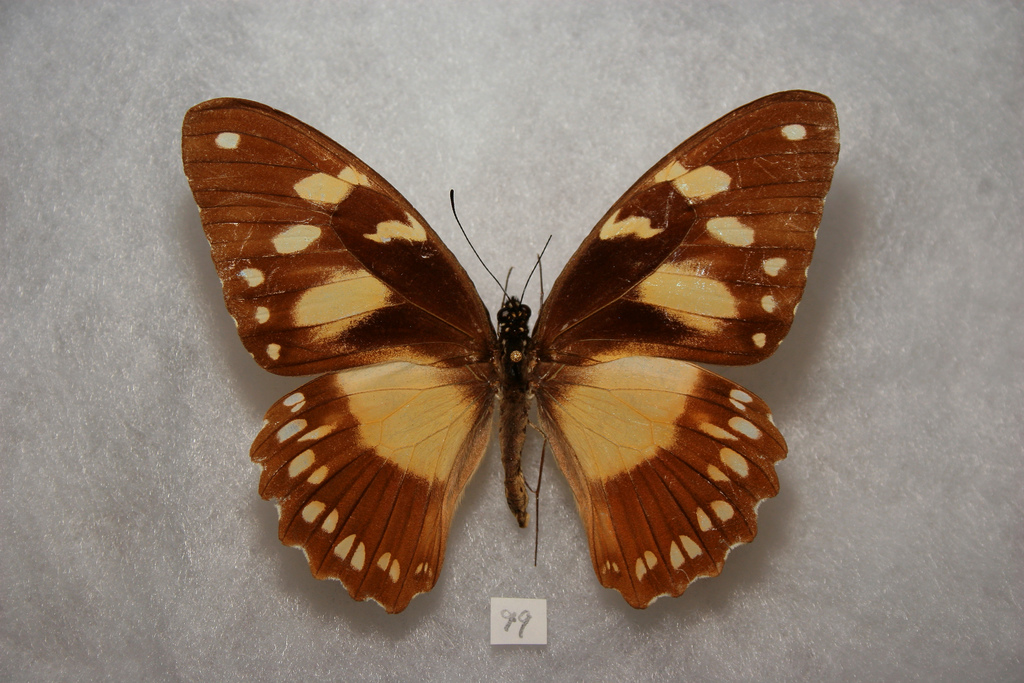
P. d. ochracea female

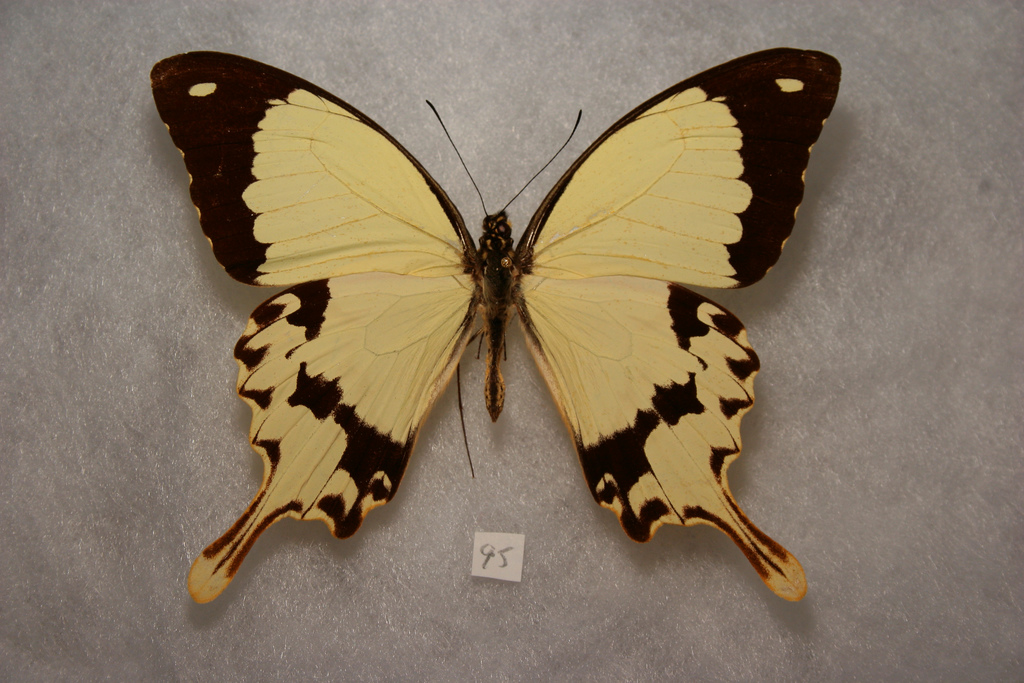
P. d. ochracea male

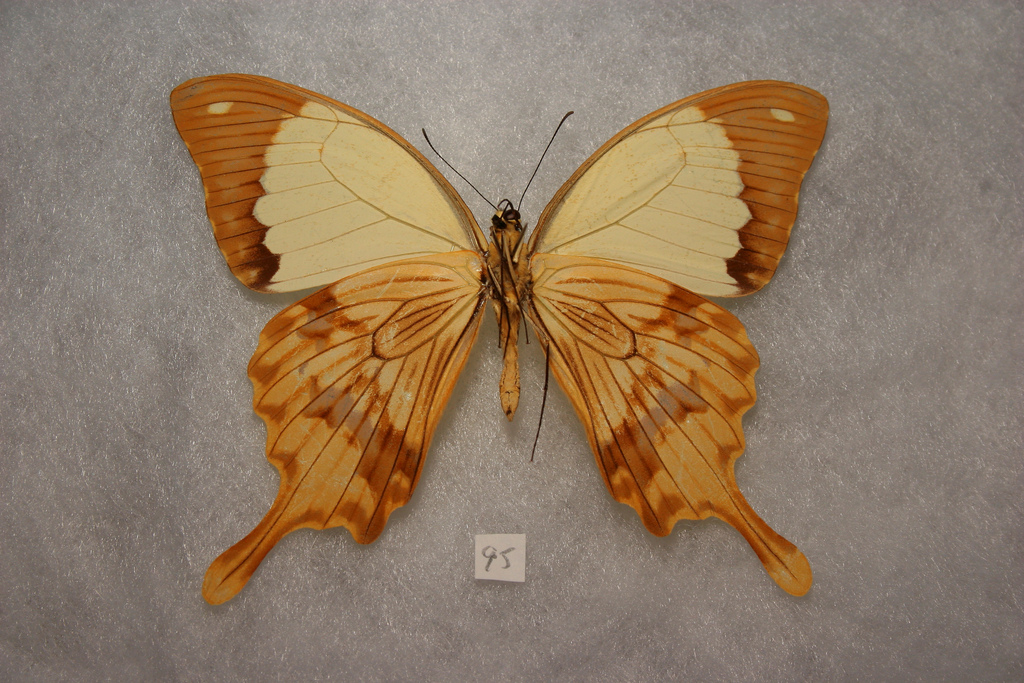
Ventral view of same male

Eclosion video

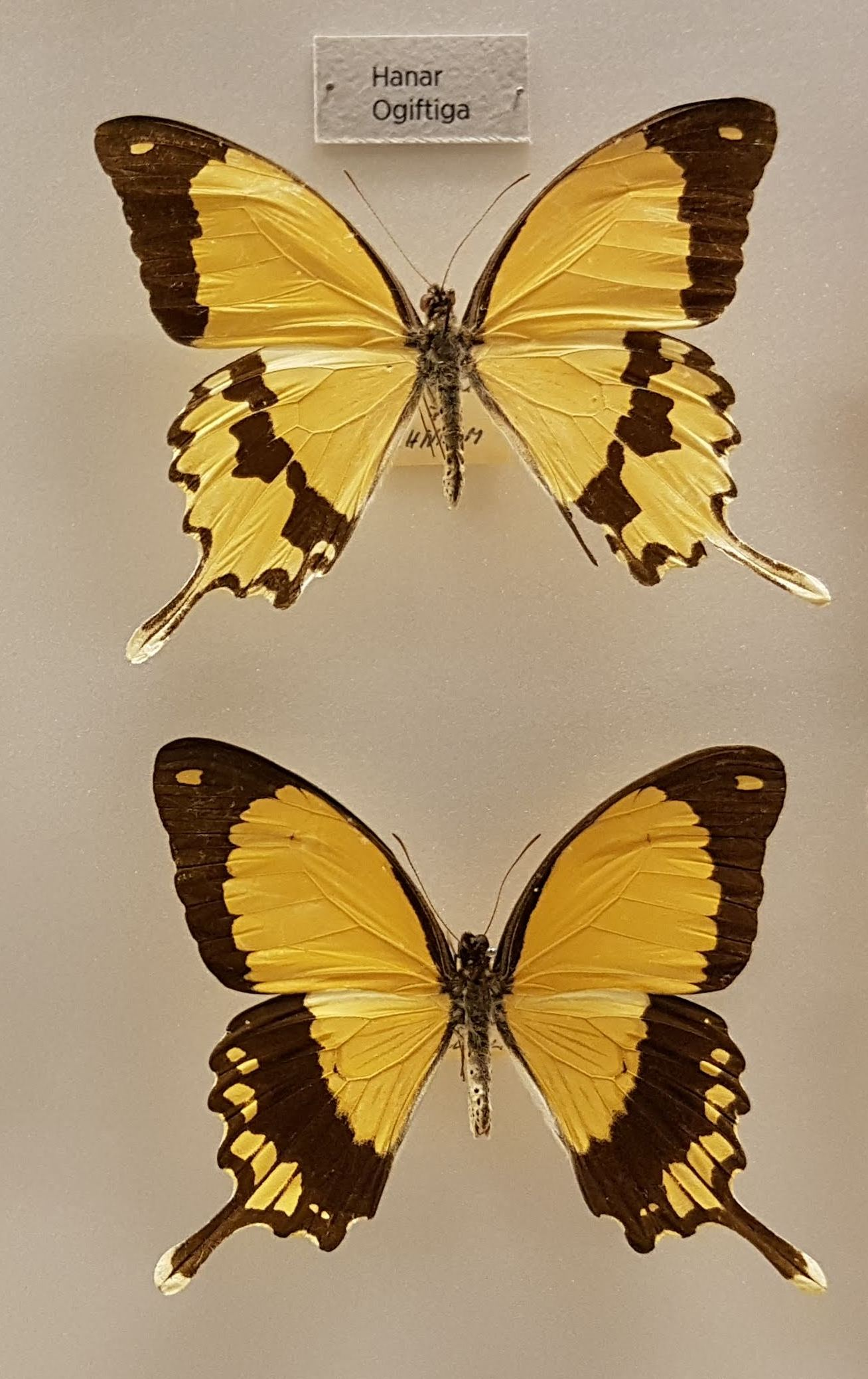
Papilo dardanus museum specimen

== See also ==
- Disruptive selection
- Phylogenetics of mimicry
- Supergene
- Cyril Clarke, E. B. Ford and Philip Sheppard (some notable researchers)
- Amauris mimetic model
