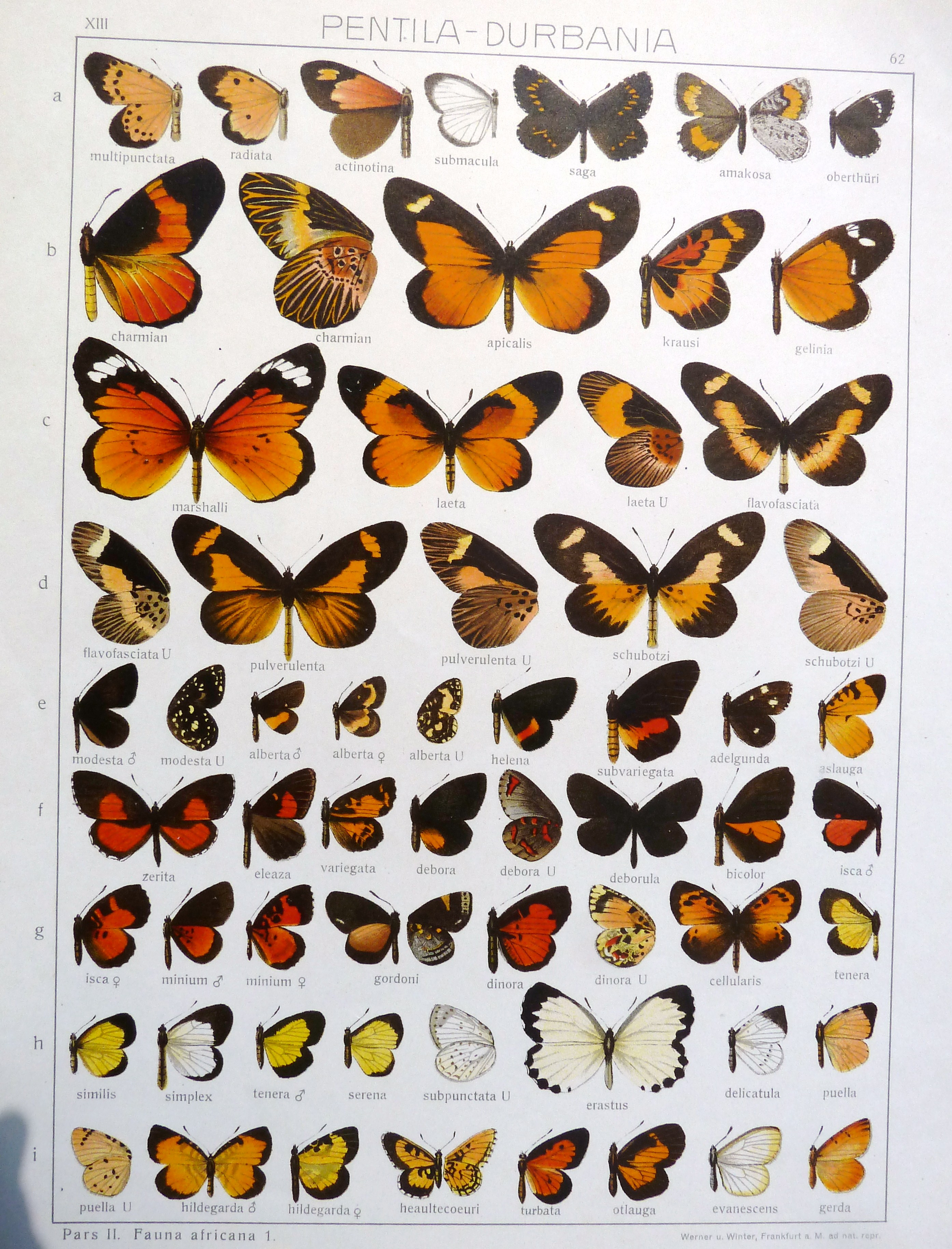
- In Adalbert Seitz's Fauna Africana

Scientific classification
- Kingdom: Animalia
- Phylum: Arthropoda
- Class: Insecta
- Order: Lepidoptera
- Family: Lycaenidae
- Genus: Durbania
- Species: D. amakosa

Binomial name
- Durbania amakosa Trimen, 1862

= Durbania amakosa =

Amakosa rocksitter

Species of butterfly

Durbania amakosa, the Amakosa rocksitter, is a butterfly of the family Lycaenidae. It is found in South Africa.

The wingspan is 26–35 mm for males and 29–38 mm for females. Adults are on wing from November to January. There is one generation per year.

The larvae feed on cyanobacteria species.

== Subspecies ==
- Durbania amakosa amakosa (KwaZulu-Natal and Eastern Cape)
- Durbania amakosa albescens Quickelberge, 1981 (localised from Margate to Port Edward in southern KwaZulu-Natal)
- Durbania amakosa ayresi van Son, 1941 (along Drakensberg from Eswatini to Mpumalanga)
- Durbania amakosa flavida Quickelberge, 1981 (rare and localised in lower KwaZulu-Natal hills)
- Durbania amakosa natalensis van Son, 1959 (KwaZulu-Natal midlands and Drakensberg foothills)
- Durbania amakosa penningtoni van Son, 1959 (Eastern Cape from Bedford to Grahamstown and Port Elizabeth)
- Durbania amakosa sagittata Henning & Henning, 1993 (eastern Drakensberg and Maluti foothills and Free State)
