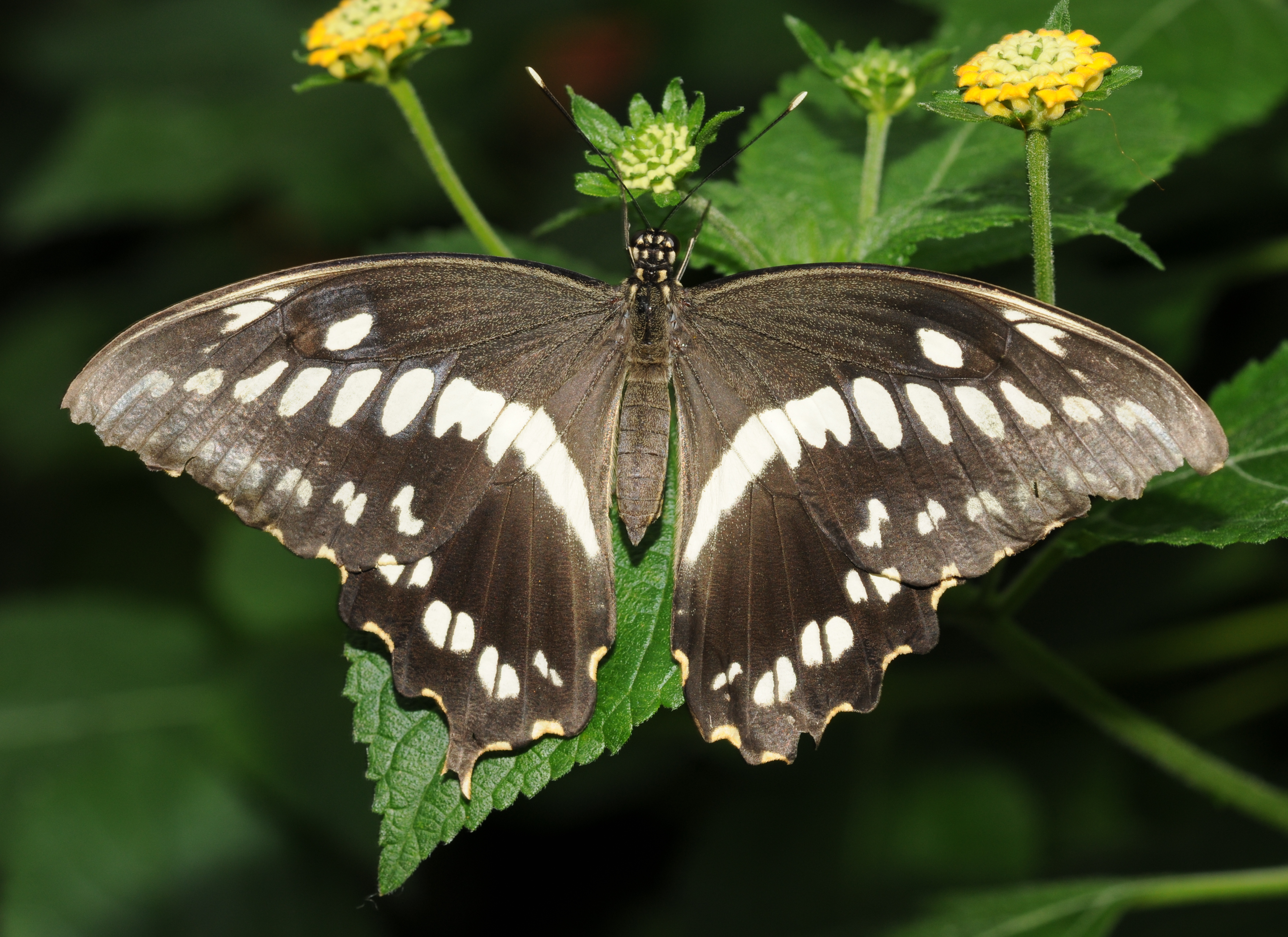

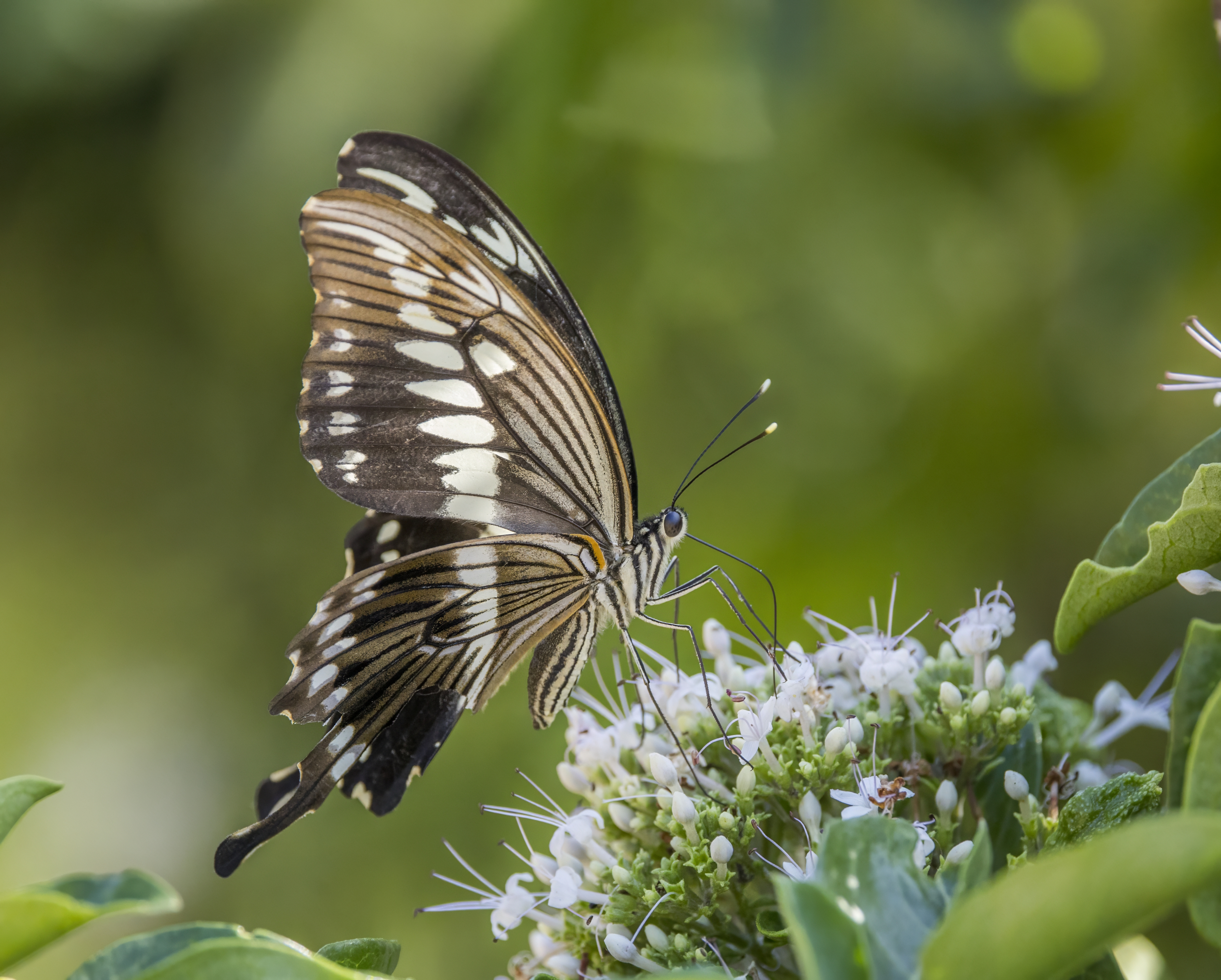

Scientific classification
- Kingdom: Animalia
- Phylum: Arthropoda
- Clade: Pancrustacea
- Class: Insecta
- Order: Lepidoptera
- Family: Papilionidae
- Genus: Papilio
- Species: P. constantinus

Binomial name
- Papilio constantinus Ward, 1871

Synonyms
- Princeps constantinus; Papilio constantinus f. chrysothemis Stoneham, 1931; Papilio constantinus alticola Le Cerf, 1924; Papilio constantinus monticolus Le Cerf, 1924; Papilio constantinus f. mathieui Dufrane, 1946; Papilio constantinus mweruana f. wittei Berger, 1981

= Papilio constantinus =

Constantine's swallowtail

Species of butterfly

Papilio constantinus, the Constantine's swallowtail, is a butterfly of the family Papilionidae. It is found in Sub-Saharan Africa.

Males have a wingspan of 70–90 mm and females a wingspan of 80–95 mm. The female is a larger than the male on average but the sexual dimorphism remains low.

On the obverse, the wings are a rather dull brown colour. The forewings are paler at the base, they bear a broken white or cream band, a macule of the same colour in the cell, a few macules at the apex, and a series of small submarginal macules. The hindwings have spoon-shaped tails. They are paler at the base and have a white or cream band and a series of submarginal macules of the same color.

On the reverse the motifs are similar but the wings are lighter. The brown parts are faded but the veins remain dark brown and there are some dark brown lines in the intravenous spaces and in the forewing cell. The hindwings have an orange dot in the anal angle.

The body is cream coloured underneath, with black lines on the abdomen, and dark brown above.

Its flight period is during the warmer months peaking from November to February.

The larvae feed on Vepris Reflexi, Vepris lanceolata, Vepris undulata, Clausena species, Citrus species, Teclea trifoliatum, Teclea nobilis, and Teclea gerrardii.

== Taxonomy ==
Papilio constantinus is a member of the dardanus species group. The members of the clade are:

- Papilio dardanus Brown, 1776
- Papilio constantinus Ward, 1871
- Papilio delalandei Godart, [1824]
- Papilio phorcas Cramer, [1775]
- Papilio rex Oberthür, 1886

== Subspecies ==
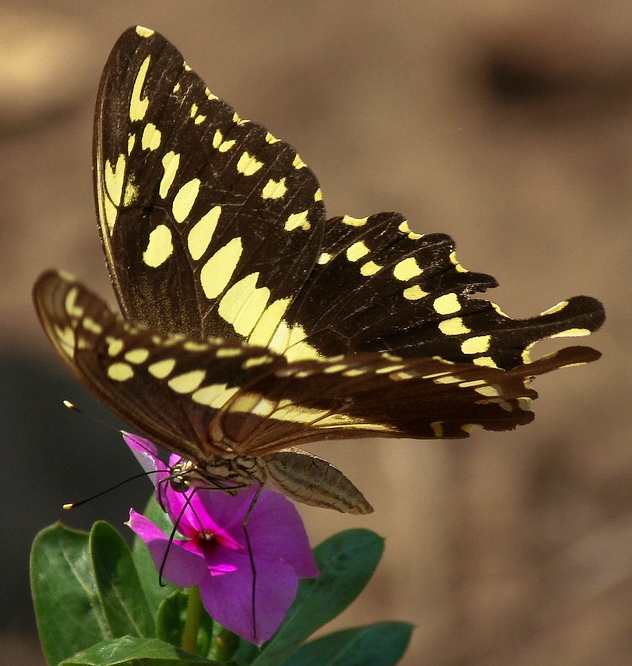

Listed alphabetically:

- Papilio constantinus constantinus Ward, 1871 (south-eastern Ethiopia, southern Somalia, coast of Kenya, Tanzania, Malawi, southern and north-eastern Zambia, Mozambique, Zimbabwe, eastern Botswana, South Africa, Eswatini)
- Papilio constantinus lecerfi Koçak, 1996 (Kenya: central highlands and the Mau Escarpment)
- Papilio constantinus mweruanus Joicey & Talbot, 1927 (Democratic Republic of the Congo, western Tanzania, Zambia)

== Biogeographic realm ==
Afrotropical realm.
