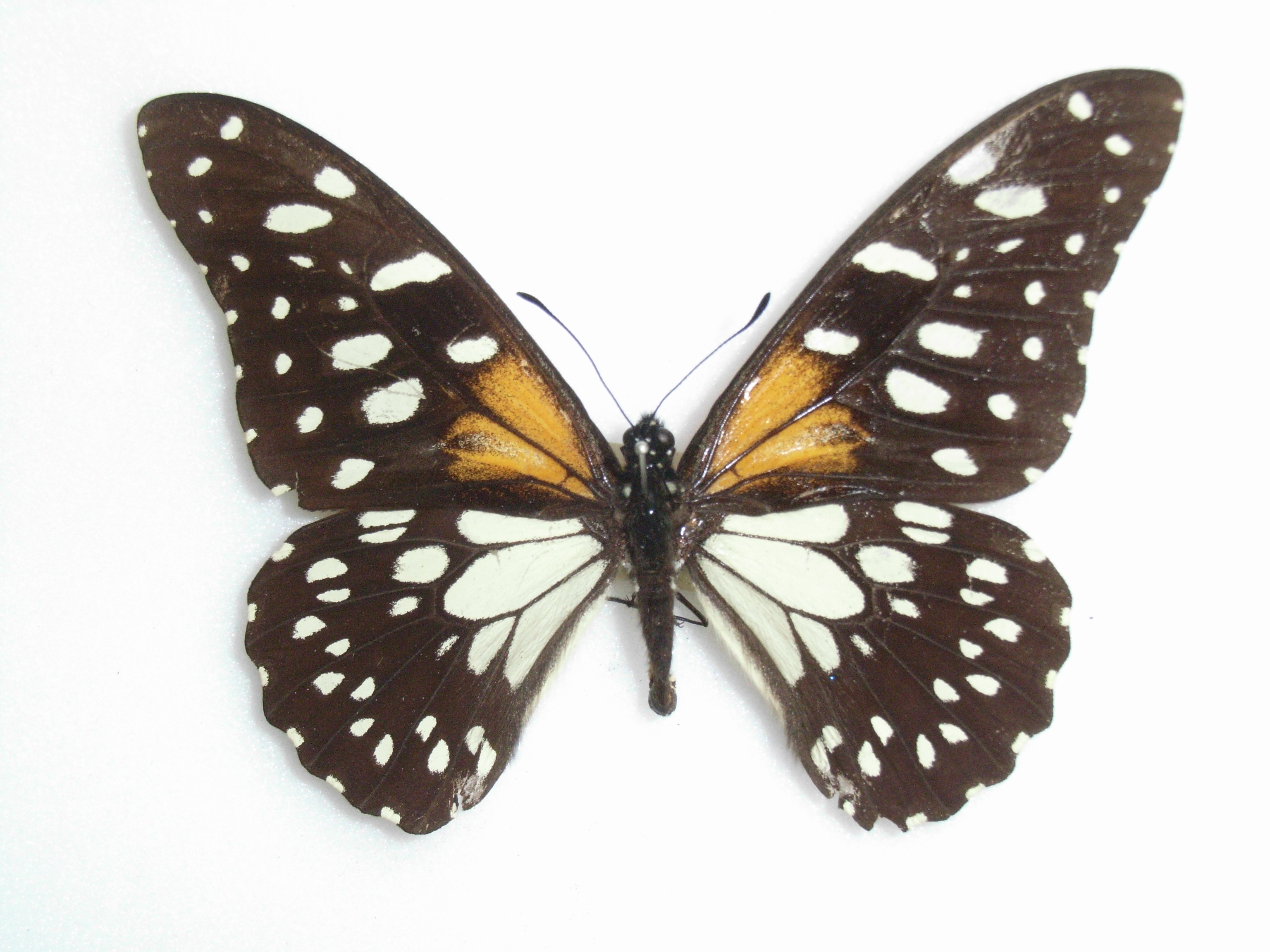

Scientific classification
- Kingdom: Animalia
- Phylum: Arthropoda
- Clade: Pancrustacea
- Class: Insecta
- Order: Lepidoptera
- Family: Papilionidae
- Genus: Papilio
- Species: P. rex

Binomial name
- Papilio rex Oberthür, 1886

Synonyms
- Papilio mimeticus Rothschild, 1897; Papilio schultzei Aurivillius, 1904; Papilio rex var. arnoldi Richelmann, 1909; Papilio abyssinicus Poulton, 1926; Papilio rex f. commixta Aurivillius, 1908; Papilio rexi f. commixta Aurivillius, 1908; Papilio rex var. alinderi f. lindblomi Bryk, 1928; Papilio rex f. intermediata Bryk, 1930; Papilio rex alinderi f. holmi Bryk, 1953; Papilio rex barnsi Le Cerf, 1924; Papilio rex var. regulus Le Cerf, 1919; Papilio rex ab. eisneri Bryk, 1928; Papilio rex f. endymion Stoneham, 1951

= Papilio rex =

Species of butterfly

Papilio rex, the regal swallowtail or king papilio, is a butterfly of the family Papilionidae. It is found in Africa. It is a semi-montane and montane forest (1, 300 m. to 2 600 m.) species. The larvae feed on Teclea tricocarpa, Teclea stuhlmanni, Calodendrum, Citrus, Clausena, Fagara and Toddalia species. In the early morning and late afternoon adults of both sexes descend from the forest canopy to feed from the flowers of Lantana, Impatiens and Bougainvillea. It hilltops on granite outcrops and mud puddles.

The Kenyan forms mimic Tirumala formosa, the forest monarch butterfly.

== Description ==
The male is significantly larger than the female, but the patterns of the two sexes are similar. The male reaches a wingspan of 17 cm[1]. On the obverse, the wings are black or dark brown. The forewings are quite elongated, they are orange at the base and have white macules. The hindwings are rounded, white or cream in the basal area and crossed by black veins while the rest of the wing is studded with white macules. The underside is similar but the wings are slightly lighter and the orange part of the forewings is more extensive. The thorax and head are black and dotted with white macules, the abdomen is black above and white below and on the sides.

This species mimics the appearance of Tirumala formosa and more precisely of Tirumala formosa morgeni, a species of poisonous butterfly[

== Taxonomy ==
Papilio rex is a member of the dardanus species group. The members of the clade are:

- Papilio dardanus Brown, 1776
- Papilio constantinus Ward, 1871
- Papilio delalandei Godart, [1824]
- Papilio phorcas Cramer, [1775]
- Papilio rex Oberthür, 1886

== Subspecies ==
- Papilio rex rex (Kenya (east of the Rift Valley), north-eastern Tanzania, central Tanzania)
- Papilio rex mimeticus Rothschild, 1897 (Congo Republic, Uganda, Rwanda, Burundi, north-western Tanzania, western Kenya)
- Papilio rex franciscae Carpenter, 1928 (southern Sudan, south-western Ethiopia)
- Papilio rex alinderi Bryk, 1928 (Kenya (highlands west of the Rift Valley))
- Papilio rex schultzei Aurivillius, 1904 (eastern Nigeria, highlands of Cameroon)
- Papilio rex abyssinicana Vane-Wright, 1995 (highlands of south-eastern Ethiopia)
- Papilio rex regulana Vane-Wright, 1995 (Kenya (highlands east of the Rift Valley))

== Biogeographic realm ==
Afrotropical realm
