= James Henry Bowker =

(1825–1900) South African naturalist, archaeologist and soldier

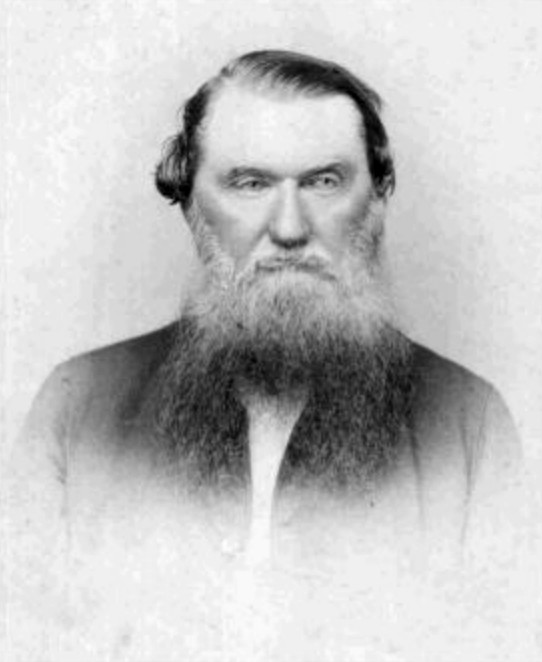
- Born: William Henry Bowker; 23 August 1825; Olive Burn farm, Port Kowie, Cape Colony
- Died: 27 October 1900 (aged 75); Durban, Colony of Natal
- Known for: Lepidoptera

Colonel James Henry Bowker (23 August 1825 – 27 October 1900), was a Cape Colony naturalist, archaeologist and soldier. He was co-author with Roland Trimen of South African Butterflies (1887–89; 3 vols.).

== Early life ==
Bowker was the ninth and youngest son of Miles Bowker (born c.1758 at Deckham's Hall, Gateshead, Durham), and Anna Maria Mitford, (born 1782 in Mitford, Northumberland, died 8 July 1868 at Tharfield), both 1820 Settlers. He was born on a farm known as Olive Burn, on the Klein Monden River, north of Port Kowie. He was actually baptised as William Henry Bowker on 17 December 1825, but was known as James Henry Bowker.

== Military career ==
Bowker participated in the frontier wars of 1846 and 1850, and in 1855 he was appointed an inspector of the Frontier Armed and Mounted Police (F.A.M.P.), later succeeding Sir Walter Currie as commandant. He also acted as High Commissioner of Basutoland. During the Seventh and Eighth Kaffir Wars he was promoted to colonel. He took part in the suppression of the Kat River Rebellion and the capture of Fort Armstrong in 1846–7, for which he earned a medal and clasp. He took part in expeditions to Basutoland in 1868 and commanded a police force in the territory after its annexation. He led the Frontier Armed and Mounted Police in 1870 and commanded the expedition that led to the annexation of the diamond fields of Griqualand West in 1871. He was Chief Commissioner on the diamond fields of Griqualand West until his retirement to Malvern, Durban in 1878.

== Naturalist career ==
He was a knowledgeable naturalist and collected large numbers of butterflies which he then supplied to museums. His older sister Mary Elizabeth Bowker, who had married Frederick William Barber, was a noted botanist and entomologist as well as being a painter and author. She corresponded regularly with Joseph Hooker, William Hooker and Charles Darwin.

Bowker made many contributions to entomology, archaeology and botany over his almost 40-year long career, but his main interest was butterflies. He became an authority and the leading collector of Lepidoptera specimens of his time. He discovered 40 new species and the new genus Deloneura immaculata (named by Roland Trimen in 1868, but now considered extinct).

The South African Museum received his first collection of insects in 1860 and additional collections over the next 30 years and this continued even after his retirement.

He was involved in archaeological investigation from 1867 when he sent a collection of stone artefacts from East London to Joseph Hooker. He discovered stone implements in the diamond digging at Pniel, Western Cape on the Vaal River. He also discovered artefacts near Maputo, Inhambane, Zululand and Lesotho.

== Memberships ==
- Member of the Linnaean Society
- Member of the Zoological Society of London
- Member of the Statistical Society
- Member of the Royal Geographical Society
- Founder member of the Durban Natural History Museum (1885)
- Patron of the Eastern Province Naturalist's Society
- Corresponding member of the South African Philosophical Society
- Committee member of the Durban Botanic Society

== Personal life ==
James Henry Bowker never married.

Fort Bowker, built around 1860 to keep the Gcaleka north of the Mbashe River, was named after him, and there is still a road named after him in Maseru, the capital of Lesotho (formerly Basutoland).

== See also ==
- Deloneura immaculata

== Notes and references ==
- Standard Encyclopaedia of Southern Africa vol.2 (NASOU, Cape Town 1970)
- Trimen, Roland; Bowker, James Henry (1889). South-African Butterflies: A Monograph of the Extra-tropical Species. Trübner & Company.
