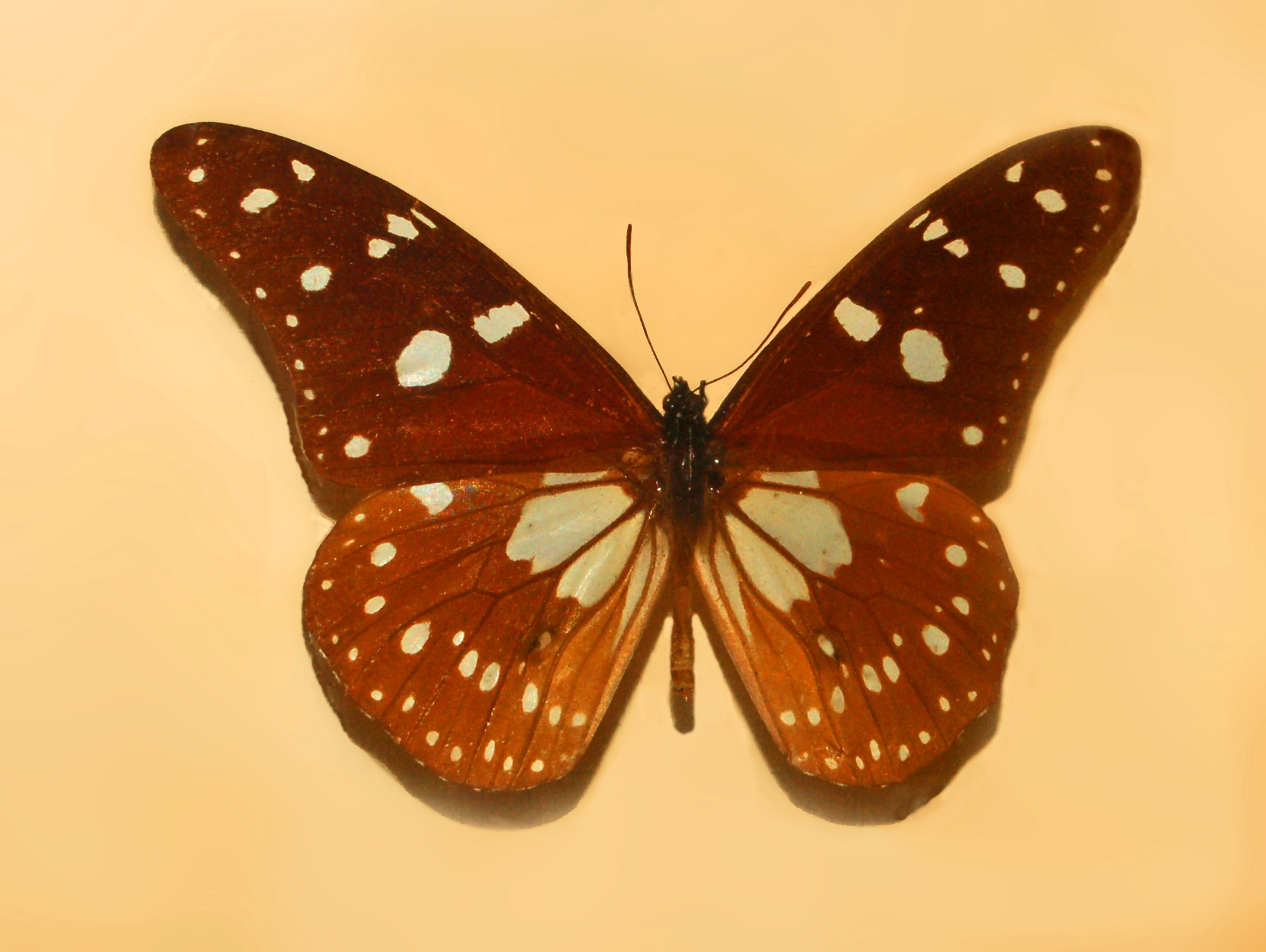
- T. f. mercedonia from Uganda

Scientific classification
- Domain: Eukaryota
- Kingdom: Animalia
- Phylum: Arthropoda
- Class: Insecta
- Order: Lepidoptera
- Family: Nymphalidae
- Genus: Tirumala
- Species: T. formosa

Binomial name
- Tirumala formosa (Godman, 1880)

Synonyms
- Danais formosa Godman, 1880; Melinda mercedonia Karsch, 1894; Elsa morgeni Honrath, 1892; Danaus formosa f. yala Stoneham, 1958

= Tirumala formosa =

Species of butterfly

Tirumala formosa, the forest monarch or beautiful tiger, is a butterfly of the family Nymphalidae.

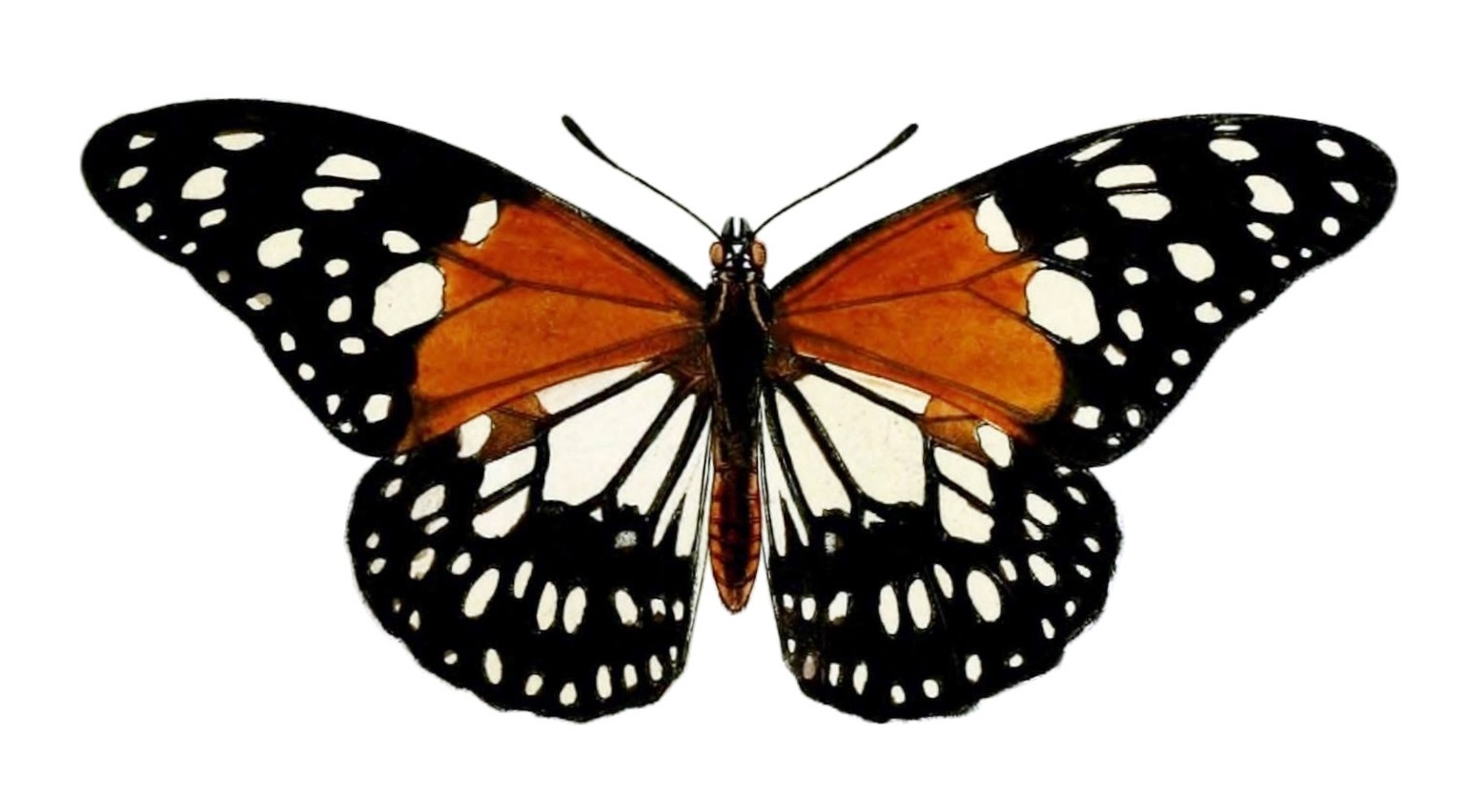
Illustration accompanying the original description as Danais formosa

== Description ==
Tirumala formosa has a wingspan reaching about 75–85 millimetres (3.0–3.3 in). The uppersides of the forewings are black with several white spots and a reddish-brown basal area. The uppersides of the hindwings are black, with a series of small white spots and a large hyaline basal area. The body is black with white spots. The undersides of the wings are similar to the uppersides, but the colours are paler.

This species is mimicked (Batesian mimicry) by the Kenyan forms of the regal swallowtail (Papilio rex).

The larvae feed on Secamone - S. micrandra, S. platystigma, S. punctulosa, S. zambesiaca and Periploca linearifolia.

== Distribution ==
Tirumala formosa can be found in tropical Africa (Cameroon, Ethiopia, Kenya and Tanzania).

== Habitat ==
This species lives in semimontane forests, at an elevation of about 1,500–2,300 metres (4,900–7,500 ft) above sea level.

== Subspecies ==
- T. f. formosa — eastern Kenya - east of the Rift Valley, north-eastern Tanzania
- T. f. mercedonia (Karsch, 1894) — western Kenya - west of Rift Valley, Uganda, Rwanda, Burundi, north-western Tanzania
- T. f. morgeni (Honrath, 1892) — Cameroon
- T. f. neumanni (Rothschild, 1902) — Ethiopia
