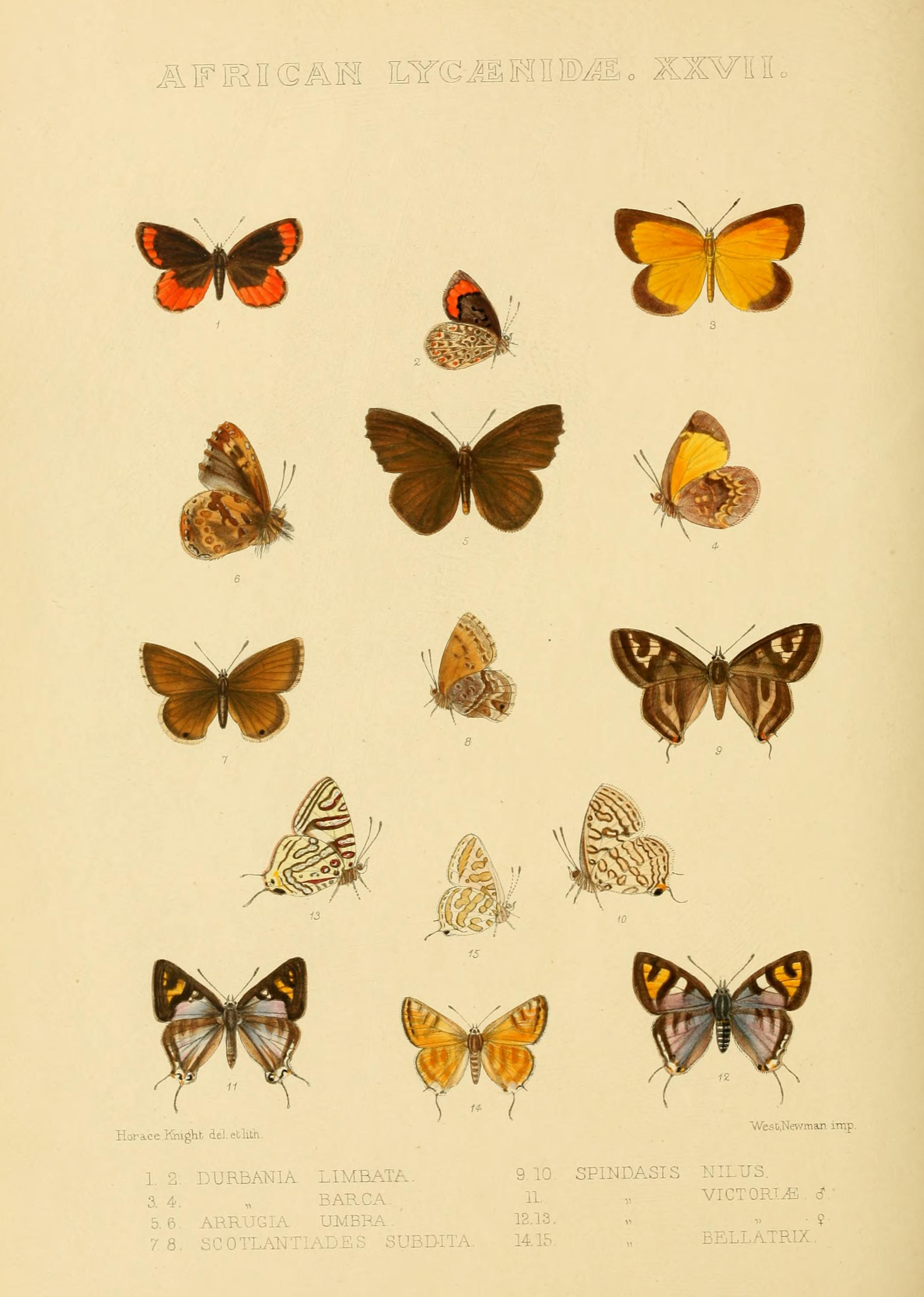
- Durbania limbata figures 1 and 2

Scientific classification
- Domain: Eukaryota
- Kingdom: Animalia
- Phylum: Arthropoda
- Class: Insecta
- Order: Lepidoptera
- Family: Lycaenidae
- Subfamily: Poritiinae
- Genus: Durbania; Trimen, 1862

= Durbania =

Butterfly genus in family Lycaenidae

Durbania is a genus of butterflies in the family Lycaenidae. The species of this genus are endemic to the Afrotropical realm.

== Species ==
- Durbania amakosa Trimen, 1862
- Durbania limbata Trimen, 1887
