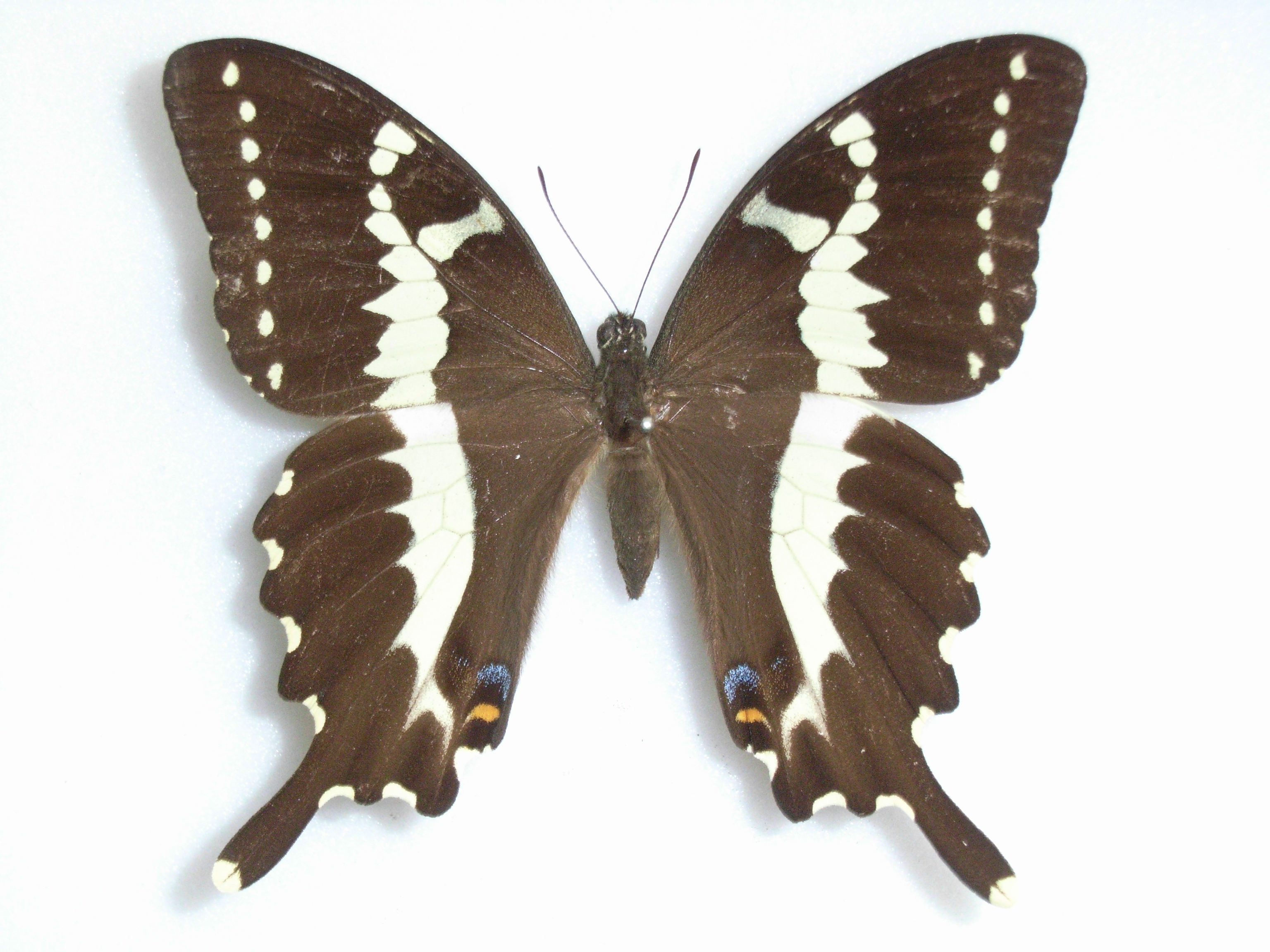
- Female
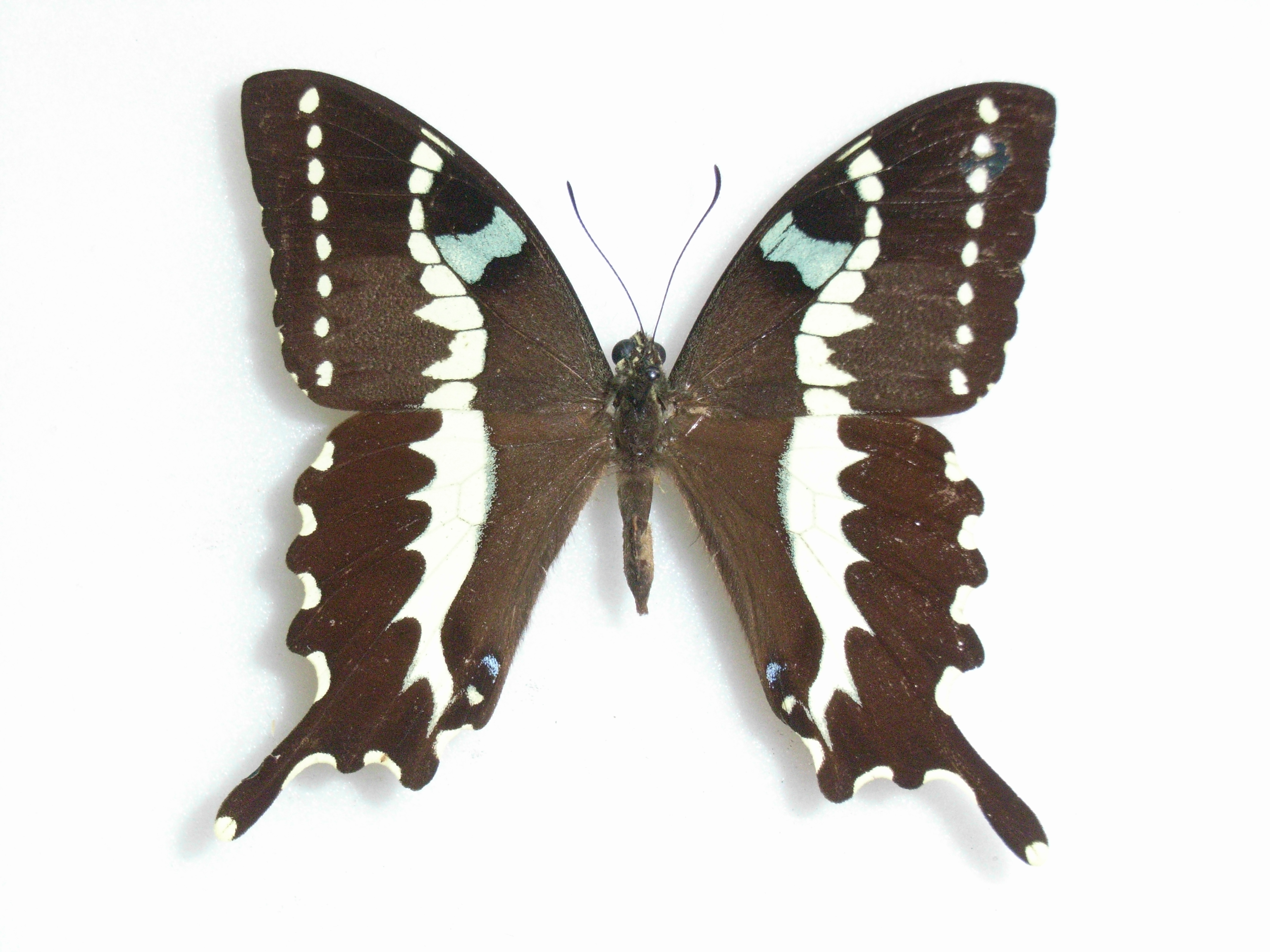
- Male

Scientific classification
- Kingdom: Animalia
- Phylum: Arthropoda
- Clade: Pancrustacea
- Class: Insecta
- Order: Lepidoptera
- Family: Papilionidae
- Genus: Papilio
- Species: P. delalandei

Binomial name
- Papilio delalandei Godart, [1824].

Synonyms
- Papilio lalandei Boisduval, 1836

= Papilio delalandei =

Species of butterfly

Papilio delalandei is a butterfly of the family Papilionidae. It is endemic to Madagascar.

== Taxonomy ==
Papilio delalandei is a member of the dardanus species-group. The members of the clade are

- Papilio dardanus Brown, 1776
- Papilio constantinus Ward, 1871
- Papilio delalandei Godart, [1824]
- Papilio phorcas Cramer, [1775]
- Papilio rex Oberthür, 1886
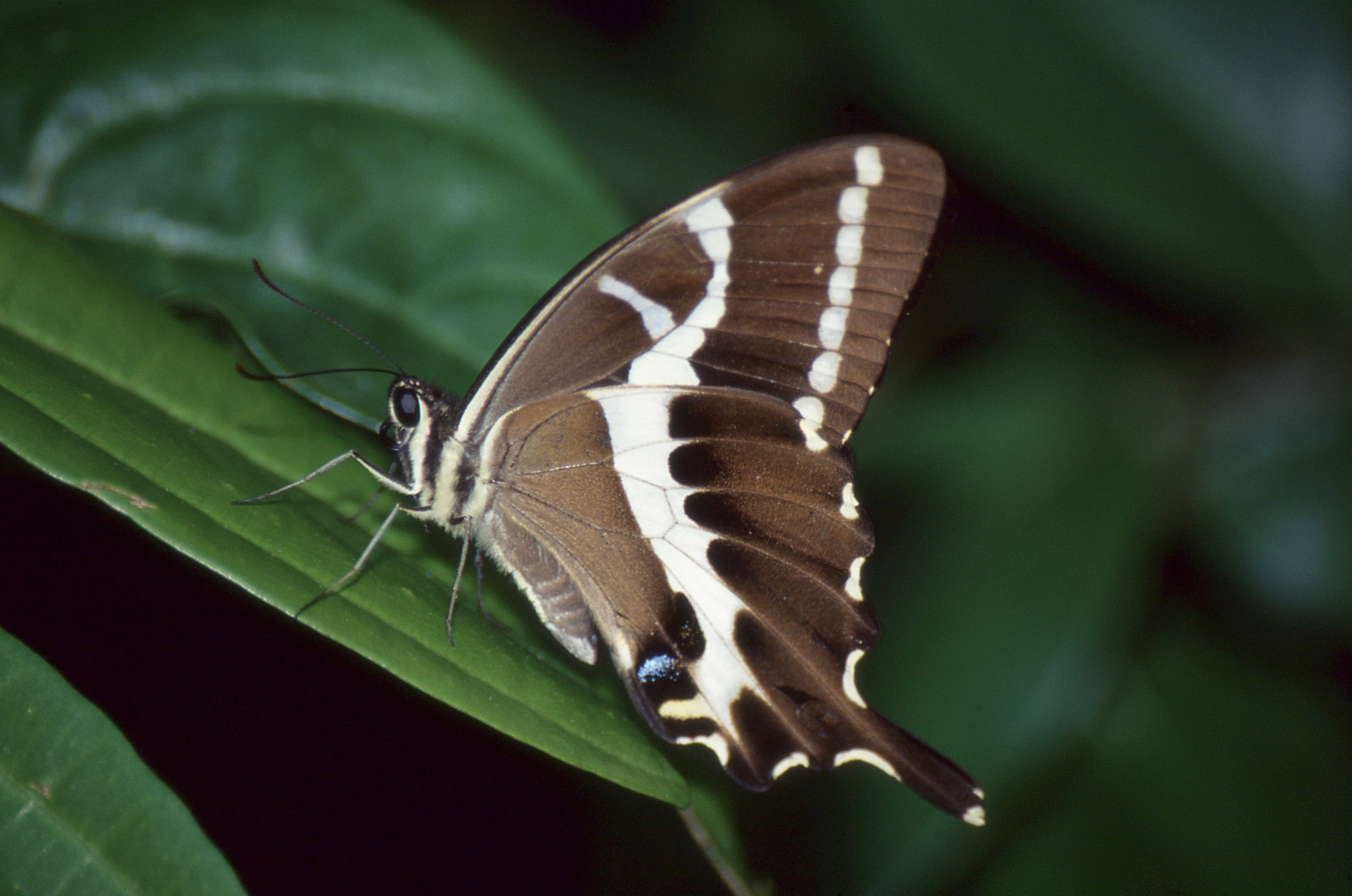
Resting

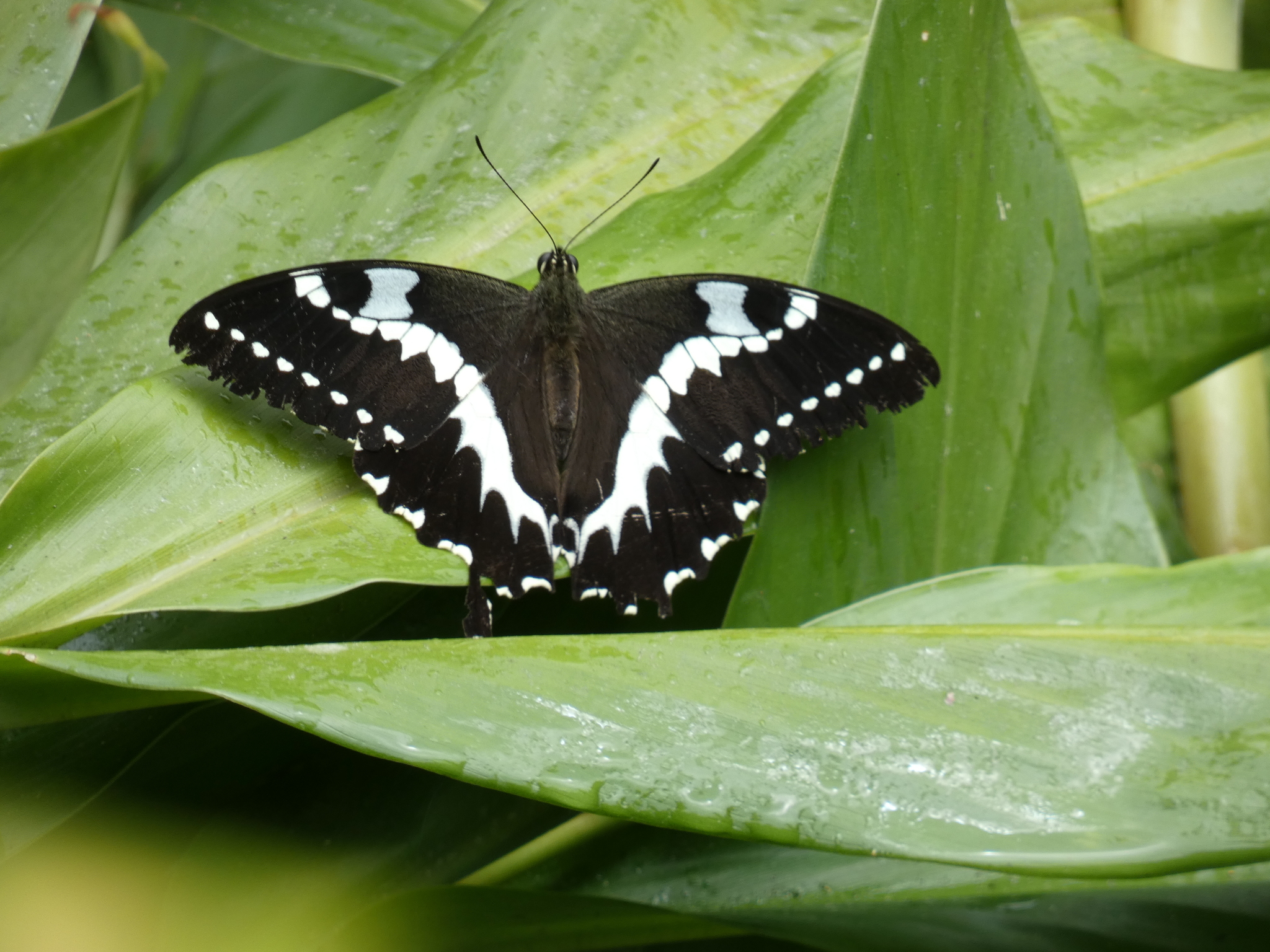
Upperside

== Biogeographic realm ==
Afrotropical realm

== Etymology ==
The name honours Pierre Antoine Delalande.
