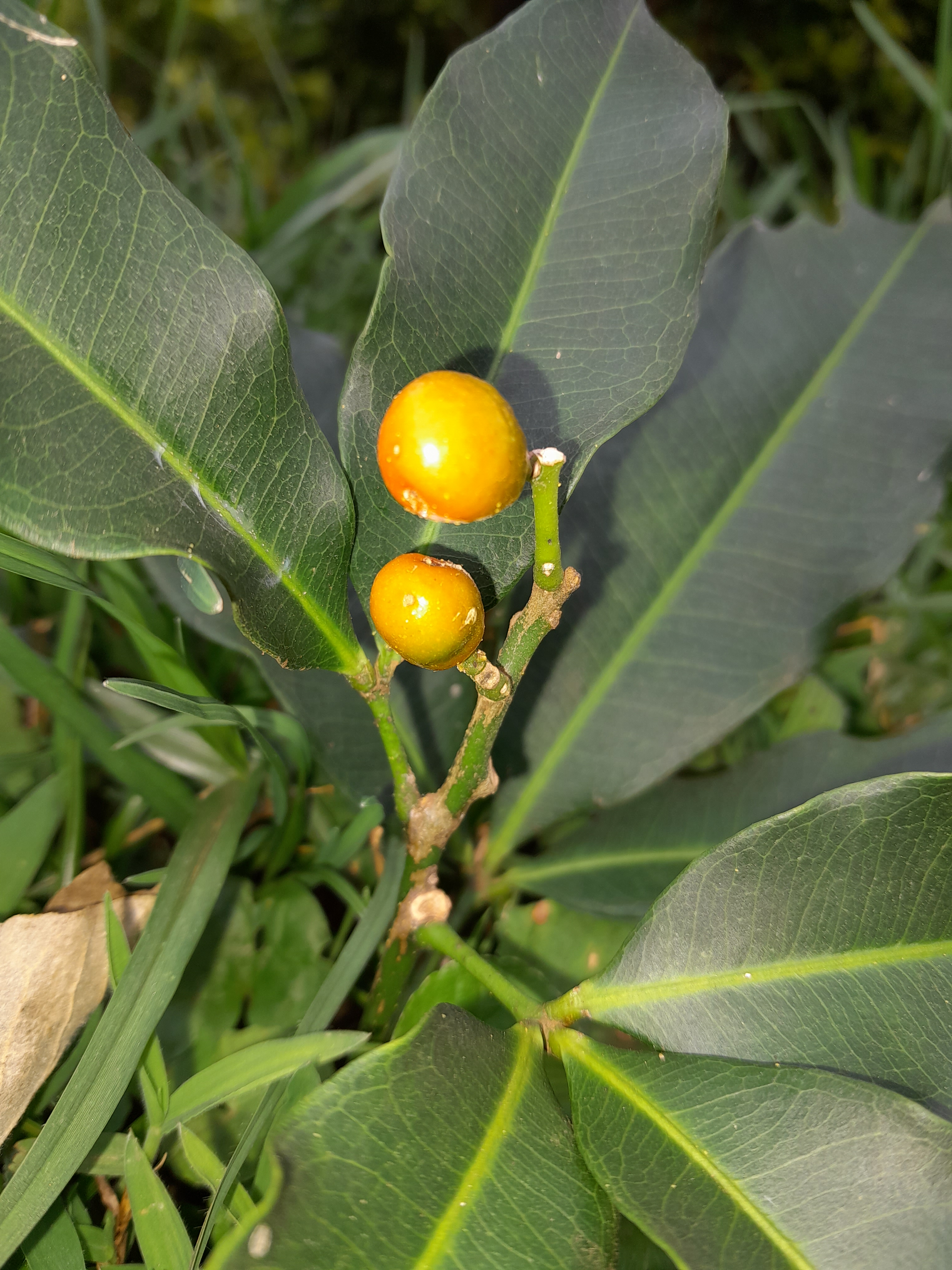

Conservation status
- Least Concern (IUCN 3.1)

Scientific classification
- Kingdom: Plantae
- Clade: Tracheophytes
- Clade: Angiosperms
- Clade: Eudicots
- Clade: Rosids
- Order: Sapindales
- Family: Rutaceae
- Genus: Vepris
- Species: V. nobilis

Binomial name
- Vepris nobilis (Delile) Mziray

Synonyms
- List: Aspidostigma acuminatum Hochst.; Cranzia nobilis (Delile) Kuntze; Teclea diversifolia Lanza; Teclea nobilis Delile; Teclea nobilis var. latifoliolata Engl.; Toddalia nobilis (Delile) Hook.f. ex Oliv.

= Vepris nobilis =

Species of plant

Vepris nobilis (syn. Teclea nobilis) is a species of flowering plant in the family Rutaceae, native to the Arabian Peninsula and eastern Africa. A tree, chimpanzees (Pan troglodytes) use its leaves to repel the mosquito Anopheles gambiae.
