= Roland Trimen =

British-South African naturalist (1840–1916)

Roland Trimen FRS
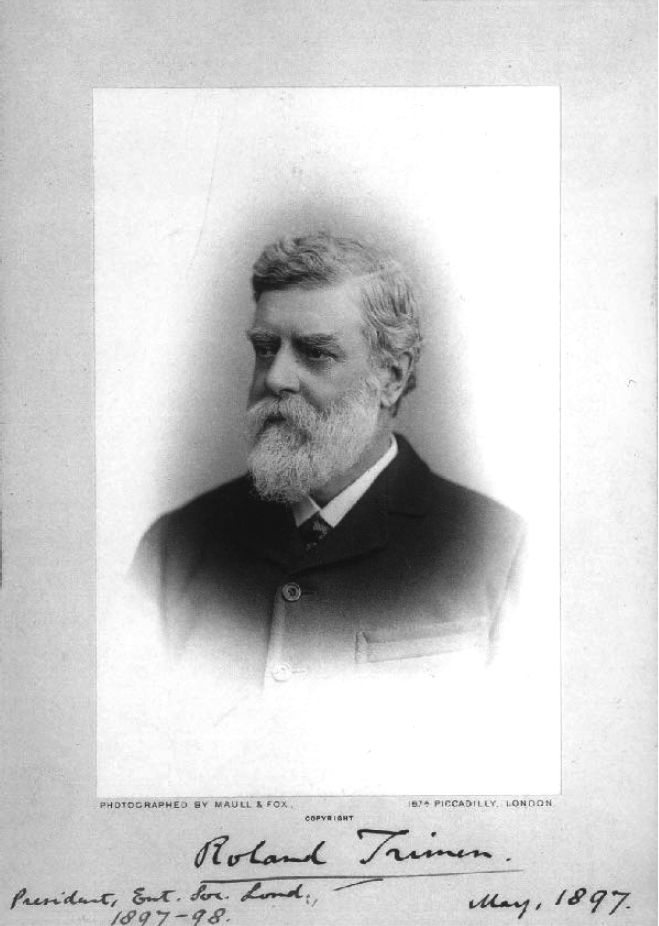
- In 1897
- Born: 29 October 1840; London
- Died: 25 July 1916 (aged 75); London
- Education: King's College School
- Known for: South African Butterflies
- Spouse: Henrietta Bull
- Awards: Darwin Medal
- Scientific career
- Fields: Entomology
- Workplaces: South African Museum

Roland Trimen FRS (29 October 1840 in London – 25 July 1916 in London) was a British-South African naturalist, best known for South African Butterflies (1887–89), a collaborative work with Colonel James Henry Bowker. He was among the first entomologists to investigate mimicry and polymorphism in butterflies and their restriction to females. He also collaborated with Charles Darwin to study the pollination of Disa orchids.

== Life and career ==
Trimen was born in London in 1840, the son of Richard and Mary Ann Esther Trimen and the older brother of the botanist Henry Trimen (1843-1896) who went to Ceylon (now Sri Lanka). He went to study at Rottingdean and then at King's College School in Wimbledon.

Trimen was interested in entomology but a chronic laryngeal condition forced him to move to the Cape of Good Hope as a treatment. Reaching there he volunteered under Edgar Leopold Layard at the South African Museum to arrange the museum's collection of beetles.

He joined the Cape Public Service as a clerk in 1860 and later became private secretary to Richard Southey. Still later he served as secretary to Sir Henry Barkly, who was himself a keen botanist. From 1866 to 1867 Trimen served as part-time curator of the South African Museum. In August 1872 he went to Griqualand West as acting private secretary to the governor, Henry Barkley. In January 1873 he was again appointed part-time curator of the South African Museum in Cape Town, succeeding Edgar Leopold Layard. He remained private secretary to the governor and hence could only devote one day a week to the museum.

In July 1876 he was appointed full-time curator of the South African Museum in absentia as he had accompanied Premier John Charles Molteno to Britain and only returned in October of that year. He remained in that position until 1895 when failing health caused him to take six-month's leave, at the end of which he resigned his position at the South African Museum.

== Selected works ==
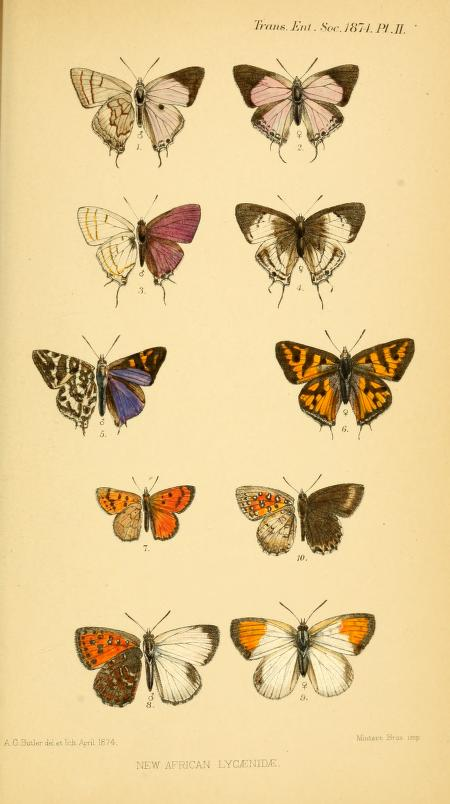
Plate accompanying "On some new species of South African Lycaenidae". Transactions of the Entomological Society of London. 1874.

Trimen studied Cape Lepidoptera in the years prior to his appointment as full-time curator of the South African Museum. He published several journal articles during this time, including:

- "Entomology of the Cape of Good Hope". Transactions of the Entomological Society of London. (1858-1861).
- "On some new species of butterflies". Transactions of the Entomological Society of London. (1862-1863).

During the early part of 1867 he collected specimens from the Natal area but his interest was not primarily in collection of insects but in taxonomy. In 1862 he published the first part of Rhopalocera Africae Australis: A Catalogue of South African Butterflies, Comprising Descriptions of All the Known Species, With Notices of Their Larvae, Pupae, Localities, Habits, Seasons of Appearance, and Geographical Distribution followed in 1866 by the second part. This work was the first attempt to comprehensively describe the butterflies of South Africa.

Over the next 30 years Trimen published several significant papers on Lepidoptera, including:

- "On the butterflies of Madagascar". (1864).
- "Notes on the butterflies of Mauritius". (1867).
- "On some undescribed species of South African butterflies, including a new genus of Lycaenidae". (1868).
- "On some new species of butterflies discovered in extratropical southern Africa". (1873).

His most important work on Lepidoptera was a three volume series published in conjunction with James Henry Bowker in 1887-1889 entitled South African Butterflies: A Monograph of the Extra-Tropical Species which described 380 species. His publications made him the leading authority on South African butterflies of his time.

Trimen received butterfly specimens from a network of friends including Bowker and his sister Mary Elizabeth Barber. His Lepidoptera collection was purchased by James John Joicey.

== Other interests ==
Triman was a member of the Vine Diseases Commission of 1880 and attended the international congress on Phylloxera in Bordeaux in 1881 on behalf of the Cape Colony. He became the first chairman of the Phyloxerra Commission in 1886 that was appointed by the Cape government to study root rot in Cape vines.

Trimen also described a new species of bird, the racket-tailed roller, based on skins provided to the South African Museum. Trimen also studied pollination in orchids and these were of interest to Charles Darwin and led to a correspondence between them.

In addition, he wrote papers about leopards, sun-birds, the teeth of a whale and rare fish.

== Recognition, awards, memberships ==
- Member of the Entomological Society of London (1859), president (1897-1898)
- Fellow of the Linnean Society (1871)
- Member of the British Association for the Advancement of Science (1871)
- Fellow of the Royal Society of London (1882)
- Founding member - South African Philosophical Society, first secretary (1877-1878), president (1883-1884)
- Honorary MA conferred by the University of Oxford (1899)
- Honorary member of the South African Ornithologists' Union (1904)
- Honorary fellow of the Royal Society of South Africa (1908)
- Darwin Medal of the Royal Society (1910)

== Private life ==
Trimen married Henrietta B. Bull in 1885. They had no children.

== See also ==
- Butterfly genus Deloneura
- Butterfly genus Durbania
- The Brenton blue butterfly
- Butterfly species Libythea laius
- Butterfly genus Erikssonia
