= List of butterflies of Rwanda =

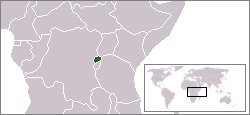
Location of Rwanda

This is a list of butterflies of Rwanda. About 176 species are known from Rwanda, three of which are endemic.

== Papilionidae ==
=== Papilioninae ===
==== Papilionini ====
- Papilio charopus montuosus Joicey & Talbot, 1927
- Papilio chrapkowskoides Storace, 1952
- Papilio rex mimeticus Rothschild, 1897
- Papilio echerioides joiceyi Gabriel, 1945
- Papilio jacksoni ruandana Le Cerf, 1924
- Papilio leucotaenia Rothschild, 1908
- Papilio mackinnoni Sharpe, 1891

==== Leptocercini ====
- Graphium antheus (Cramer, 1779)
- Graphium gudenusi (Rebel, 1911)
- Graphium angolanus baronis (Ungemach, 1932)
- Graphium ridleyanus (White, 1843)
- Graphium leonidas (Fabricius, 1793)
- Graphium almansor uganda (Lathy, 1906)

== Pieridae ==
=== Coliadinae ===
- Eurema mandarinula (Holland, 1892)
- Eurema regularis (Butler, 1876)
- Catopsilia florella (Fabricius, 1775)
- Colias electo pseudohecate Berger, 1940

=== Pierinae ===
- Colotis aurora evarne (Klug, 1829)
- Colotis auxo (Lucas, 1852)
- Colotis elgonensis basilewskyi Berger, 1956
- Colotis vesta kagera Congdon, Kielland & Collins, 1998
- Pinacopterix eriphia wittei Berger, 1940
- Leptosia nupta pseudonupta Bernardi, 1959

==== Pierini ====
- Pontia helice johnstonii (Crowley, 1887)
- Mylothris alberici Dufrane, 1940
- Mylothris bernice berenicides Holland, 1896
- Mylothris croceus Butler, 1896
- Mylothris jacksoni Sharpe, 1891
- Mylothris kiwuensis kiwuensis Grünberg, 1910
- Mylothris kiwuensis rhodopoides Talbot, 1944
- Mylothris polychroma Berger, 1981
- Mylothris rhodope (Fabricius, 1775)
- Mylothris ruandana Strand, 1909
- Mylothris rubricosta (Mabille, 1890)
- Mylothris sagala mayenceae Berger, 1987
- Belenois calypso crawshayi Butler, 1894
- Belenois raffrayi extendens (Joicey & Talbot, 1927)
- Belenois victoria schoutedeni Berger, 1953

== Lycaenidae ==
=== Miletinae ===
==== Liphyrini ====
- Aslauga purpurascens Holland, 1890

==== Miletini ====
- Lachnocnema laches (Fabricius, 1793)
- Lachnocnema durbani Trimen & Bowker, 1887
- Lachnocnema divergens Gaede, 1915

=== Poritiinae ===
==== Liptenini ====
- Ornipholidotos peucetia (Hewitson, 1866)

=== Theclinae ===
- Oxylides albata (Aurivillius, 1895)
- Hypolycaena jacksoni Bethune-Baker, 1906
- Pilodeudorix mera kinumbensis (Dufrane, 1945)
- Pilodeudorix zelomina (Rebel, 1914)

=== Polyommatinae ===
==== Lycaenesthini ====
- Anthene afra (Bethune-Baker, 1910)
- Anthene contrastata mashuna (Stevenson, 1937)
- Anthene hobleyi kigezi Stempffer, 1961
- Anthene schoutedeni (Hulstaert, 1924)

==== Polyommatini ====
- Uranothauma lunifer (Rebel, 1914)
- Cacyreus tespis (Herbst, 1804)
- Harpendyreus argenteostriata Stempffer, 1961
- Harpendyreus kisaba (Joicey & Talbot, 1921)
- Harpendyreus major (Joicey & Talbot, 1924)
- Harpendyreus marungensis wollastoni (Bethune-Baker, 1926)
- Harpendyreus reginaldi Heron, 1909
- Leptotes marginalis (Stempffer, 1944)
- Euchrysops crawshayi fontainei Stempffer, 1967
- Euchrysops mauensis Bethune-Baker, 1923
- Euchrysops subpallida Bethune-Baker, 1923
- Thermoniphas distincta (Talbot, 1935)
- Thermoniphas plurilimbata rutshurensis (Joicey & Talbot, 1921)
- Lepidochrysops loveni kivuensis (Joicey & Talbot, 1921)

== Riodinidae ==
=== Nemeobiinae ===
- Abisara rutherfordii cyclops Riley, 1932
- Abisara neavei Riley, 1932

== Nymphalidae ==
=== Danainae ===
==== Danaini ====
- Tirumala formosa mercedonia (Karsch, 1894)
- Amauris albimaculata magnimacula Rebel, 1914
- Amauris crawshayi oscarus Thurau, 1904
- Amauris echeria terrena Talbot, 1940
- Amauris ellioti Butler, 1895

=== Satyrinae ===
==== Melanitini ====
- Gnophodes grogani Sharpe, 1901
- Aphysoneura scapulifascia Joicey & Talbot, 1922

==== Satyrini ====
- Bicyclus aurivillii (Butler, 1896)
- Bicyclus dentata (Sharpe, 1898)
- Bicyclus jefferyi Fox, 1963
- Bicyclus matuta (Karsch, 1894)
- Bicyclus persimilis (Joicey & Talbot, 1921)
- Bicyclus saussurei angustus Condamin, 1970
- Heteropsis perspicua (Trimen, 1873)
- Heteropsis ubenica ugandica (Kielland, 1994)
- Ypthima albida Butler, 1888
- Ypthima granulosa Butler, 1883
- Ypthima recta Overlaet, 1955
- Neocoenyra duplex Butler, 1886

=== Charaxinae ===
==== Charaxini ====
- Charaxes fulvescens monitor Rothschild, 1900
- Charaxes acuminatus kigezia van Someren, 1963
- Charaxes alticola Grünberg, 1911
- Charaxes lucretius maximus van Someren, 1971
- Charaxes hansali baringana Rothschild, 1905
- Charaxes ansorgei ruandana Talbot, 1932
- Charaxes pollux (Cramer, 1775)
- Charaxes druceanus obscura Rebel, 1914
- Charaxes druceanus proximans Joicey & Talbot, 1922
- Charaxes eudoxus lequeuxi Plantrou, 1982
- Charaxes tiridates tiridatinus Röber, 1936
- Charaxes bohemani Felder & Felder, 1859
- Charaxes xiphares burgessi van Son, 1953
- Charaxes imperialis werneri Turlin, 1989
- Charaxes fournierae vandenberghei Collins, 1982
- Charaxes etesipe (Godart, 1824)
- Charaxes jahlusa rwandensis Plantrou, 1976
- Charaxes eupale latimargo Joicey & Talbot, 1921
- Charaxes montis Jackson, 1956
- Charaxes opinatus Heron, 1909
- Charaxes turlini Minig & Plantrou, 1978
- Charaxes mafuga van Someren, 1969
- Charaxes guderiana (Dewitz, 1879)
- Charaxes pleione delvauxi Turlin, 1987
- Charaxes zoolina mafugensis Jackson, 1956
- Charaxes schiltzei Bouyer, 1991

==== Euxanthini ====
- Charaxes crossleyi ansorgei (Rothschild, 1903)

=== Nymphalinae ===
- Kallimoides rumia rattrayi (Sharpe, 1904)

==== Nymphalini ====
- Antanartia schaeneia dubia Howarth, 1966
- Vanessa dimorphica (Howarth, 1966)
- Vanessa abyssinica vansomereni (Howarth, 1966)
- Junonia sophia infracta Butler, 1888
- Junonia westermanni suffusa (Rothschild & Jordan, 1903)
- Salamis cacta (Fabricius, 1793)
- Protogoniomorpha parhassus (Drury, 1782)
- Precis actia Distant, 1880
- Precis ceryne (Boisduval, 1847)
- Precis milonia wintgensi Strand, 1909
- Precis pelarga (Fabricius, 1775)
- Precis sinuata hecqui Berger, 1981
- Precis tugela pyriformis (Butler, 1896)
- Hypolimnas misippus (Linnaeus, 1764)

=== Biblidinae ===
==== Biblidini ====
- Ariadne pagenstecheri (Suffert, 1904)

=== Limenitinae ===
==== Limenitidini ====
- Cymothoe collarti werneri Beaurain, 1984
- Kumothales inexpectata Overlaet, 1940
- Pseudacraea deludens rwandaensis Hecq, 1991

==== Neptidini ====
- Neptis agouale parallela Collins & Larsen, 1996
- Neptis jordani Neave, 1910
- Neptis marci Collins & Larsen, 1998 (endemic)
- Neptis strigata kakamega Collins & Larsen, 1996

==== Adoliadini ====
- Catuna angustatum (Felder & Felder, 1867)
- Euriphene excelsior (Rebel, 1911)
- Euriphene saphirina (Karsch, 1894)
- Bebearia sophus monforti Hecq, 1990
- Bebearia dowsetti Hecq, 1990 (endemic)
- Euphaedra zaddachii crawshayi Butler, 1895
- Euphaedra barnsi Joicey & Talbot, 1922
- Euphaedra margueriteae Hecq, 1978
- Euphaedra harpalyce dowsetti Hecq, 1990

=== Heliconiinae ===
==== Acraeini ====
- Acraea eltringhami Joicey & Talbot, 1921
- Acraea endoscota Le Doux, 1928
- Acraea hamata Joicey & Talbot, 1922
- Acraea turlini Pierre, 1979 (endemic)
- Acraea asboloplintha Karsch, 1894
- Acraea persanguinea (Rebel, 1914)
- Acraea acerata Hewitson, 1874
- Acraea alciope Hewitson, 1852
- Acraea amicitiae Heron, 1909
- Acraea bonasia (Fabricius, 1775)
- Acraea serena (Fabricius, 1775)
- Acraea goetzei Thurau, 1903
- Acraea toruna Grose-Smith, 1900
- Acraea lycoa Godart, 1819
- Acraea rangatana bettiana Joicey & Talbot, 1921
- Acraea uvui Grose-Smith, 1890
- Acraea ventura ochrascens Sharpe, 1902
- Acraea cinerea Neave, 1904
- Acraea oreas Sharpe, 1891
- Acraea orinata Oberthür, 1893

==== Argynnini ====
- Issoria baumanni excelsior (Butler, 1896)

==== Vagrantini ====
- Phalanta phalantha aethiopica (Rothschild & Jordan, 1903)

== Hesperiidae ==
=== Coeliadinae ===
- Coeliades forestan (Stoll, [1782])
- Coeliades pisistratus (Fabricius, 1793)

=== Pyrginae ===
==== Tagiadini ====
- Eagris subalbida aurivillii (Neustetter, 1927)

=== Hesperiinae ===
==== Aeromachini ====
- Acleros mackenii olaus (Plötz, 1884)
- Chondrolepis niveicornis (Plötz, 1883)
- Fresna netopha (Hewitson, 1878)
- Pardaleodes fan (Holland, 1894)
- Platylesches robustus Neave, 1910

==== Baorini ====
- Zenonia crasta Evans, 1937

=== Heteropterinae ===
- Metisella abdeli (Krüger, 1928)
- Metisella alticola (Aurivillius, 1925)

== See also ==
- List of birds of Rwanda
- List of mammals of Rwanda
- List of moths of Rwanda
