= Common dotted border =

Common dotted border may refer to the following African butterflies:

- Mylothris agathina or the eastern dotted border
- Mylothris chloris or the western dotted border
- Mylothris rhodope, the Rhodope or tropical dotted border
