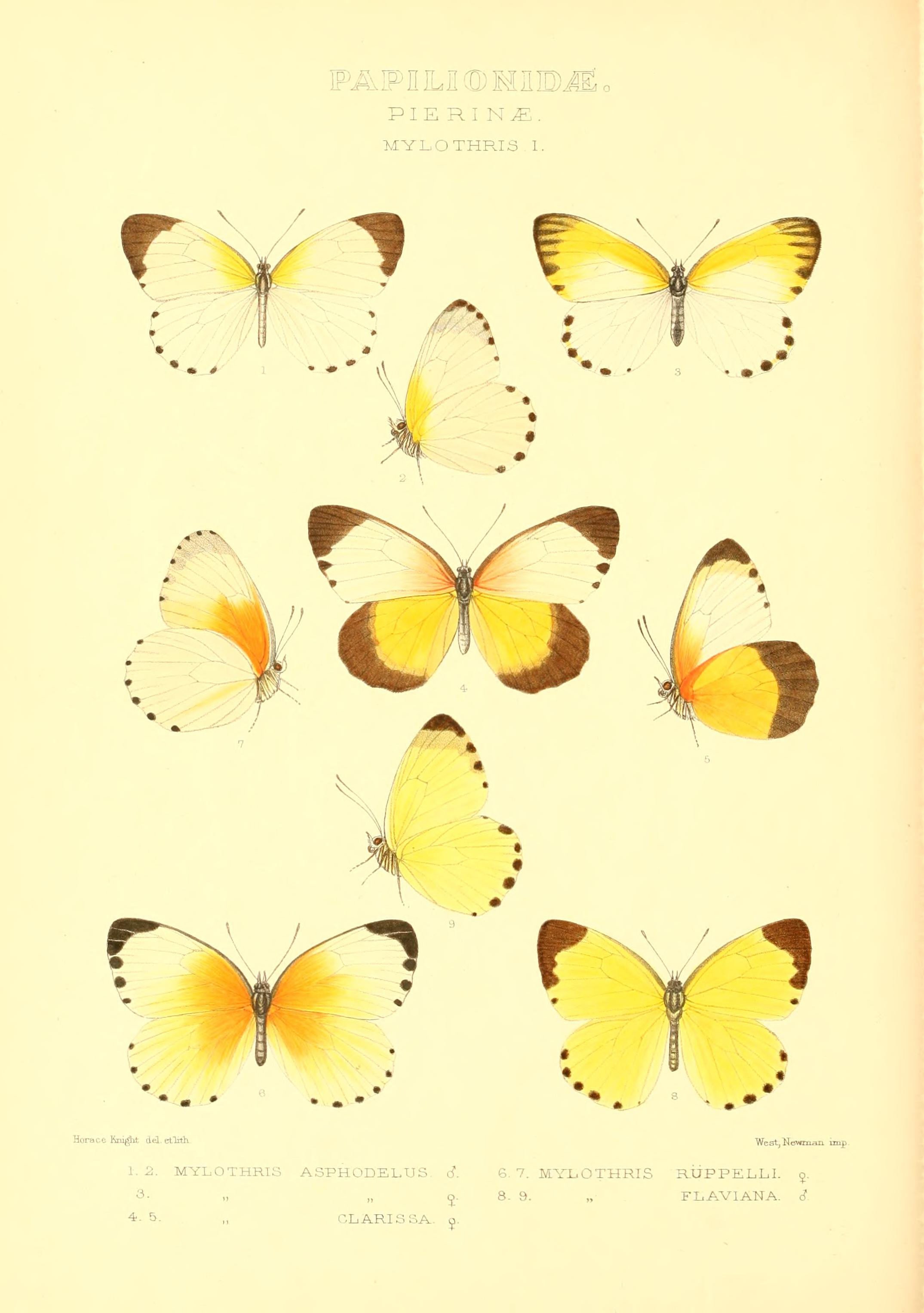
- Figures 1, 2 (male) and 3 (female)

Scientific classification
- Kingdom: Animalia
- Phylum: Arthropoda
- Clade: Pancrustacea
- Class: Insecta
- Order: Lepidoptera
- Family: Pieridae
- Genus: Mylothris
- Species: M. asphodelus

Binomial name
- Mylothris asphodelus Butler, 1888

= Mylothris asphodelus =

Species of butterfly

Mylothris asphodelus is a butterfly in the family Pieridae. It is found in eastern Nigeria, Cameroon, Gabon, the Republic of the Congo, the Democratic Republic of the Congo, Uganda, north-western Tanzania and possibly Angola. The habitat consists of lowland forests. Mylothris asphodelus, like other Mylothris species, occupies the upper portions of forests where the host plants for their larvae are found.

Males have a large yellow basal area and large black apical area on the forewing upperside. On the forewing underside, the basal area is more orange. The female forewing upperside has a large pale orange basal area.

The larvae feed on Agelanthus krausei.

== As Wolbachia carriers ==
In a study of Wolbachia among butterflies from the tropical forest regions of central Africa, numerous species in the Mylothris and Bicyclus genera were found to be infected, including Mylothris asphodelus. Previously Wolbachia had only been identified, among the Mylothris genus, in the species Mylothris agathina. Of 225 Mylothris butterflies screened, 31% (70 individuals) were found to be infected with Wolbachia. Among these, only Mylothris asphodelus, Mylothris yulei, and Mylothris uniformis were found to carry more than one strain of Wolbachia.
