= Mylothris atewa =

Atewa dotted border

Conservation status
- Vulnerable (IUCN 3.1)

Scientific classification
- Kingdom: Animalia
- Phylum: Arthropoda
- Clade: Pancrustacea
- Class: Insecta
- Order: Lepidoptera
- Family: Pieridae
- Genus: Mylothris
- Species: M. atewa

Binomial name
- Mylothris atewa Berger, 1980

Species of butterfly

Mylothris atewa, the Atewa dotted border, is a butterfly in the family Pieridae. It is endemic to the Atewa Range near Kibi, between Accra and Kumasi in Ghana.The habitat consists of upland evergreen forest.

Torben Larsen developed a species numbering system for his 2005 publication Butterflies of West Africa. This species is #112. The 'Larsen' numbers have since been used with permission in A Sharp Eye on Butterflies of Ghana.
