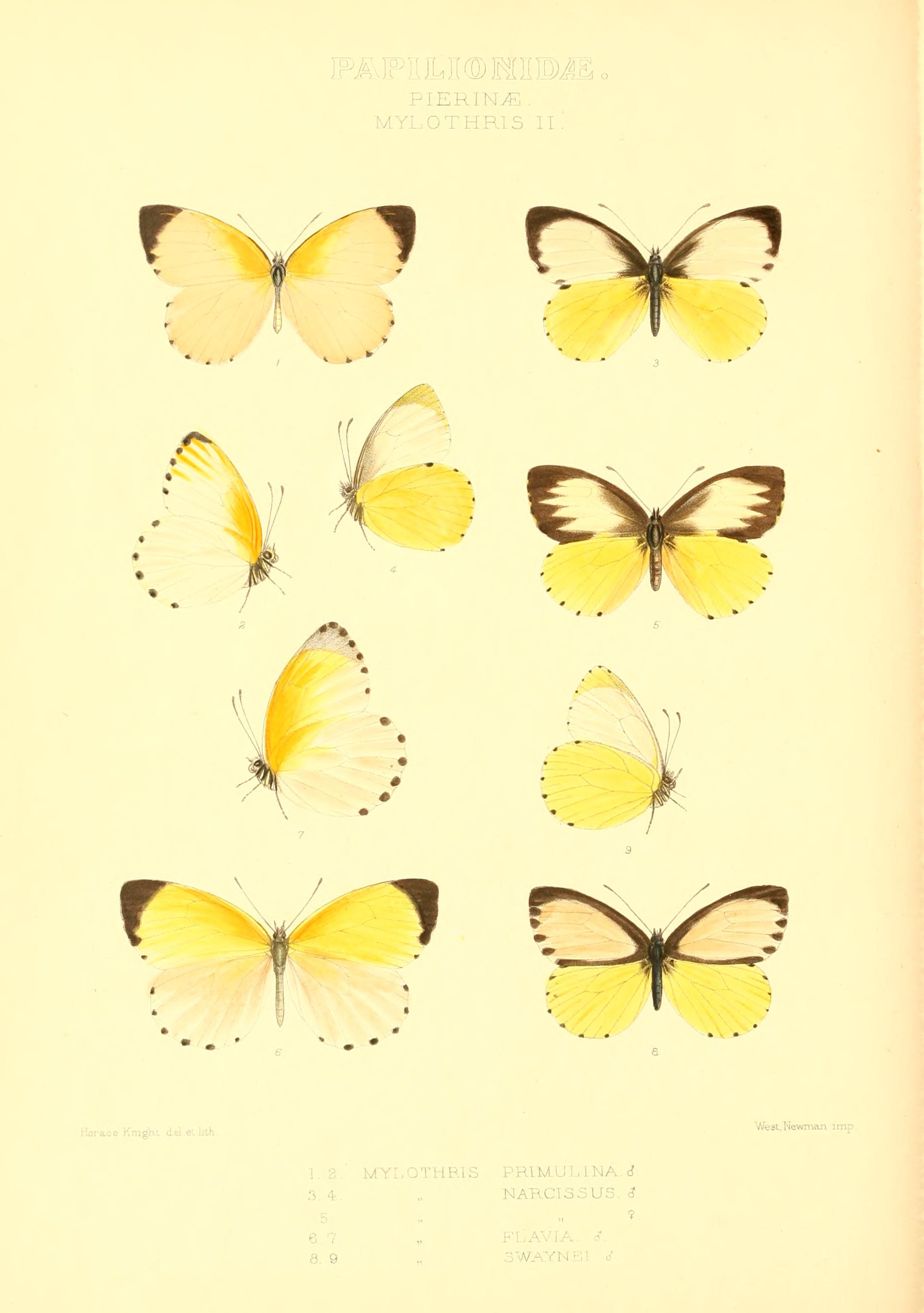
- Mylothris primulina figures 1, 2

Scientific classification
- Kingdom: Animalia
- Phylum: Arthropoda
- Clade: Pancrustacea
- Class: Insecta
- Order: Lepidoptera
- Family: Pieridae
- Genus: Mylothris
- Species: M. primulina

Binomial name
- Mylothris primulina Butler, 1897

= Mylothris primulina =

Primrose dotted border

Species of butterfly

Mylothris primulina, the primrose dotted border, is a butterfly in the family Pieridae. It is found in Nigeria. Its habitat consists of dense forests.
