= Mylothris superbus =

Scientific classification
- Kingdom: Animalia
- Phylum: Arthropoda
- Clade: Pancrustacea
- Class: Insecta
- Order: Lepidoptera
- Family: Pieridae
- Genus: Mylothris
- Species: M. superbus

Binomial name
- Mylothris superbus Kielland, 1985

Species of butterfly

Mylothris superbus is a butterfly in the family Pieridae. It is found in the Nguru Mountains of Tanzania. The habitat consists of submontane forests.
