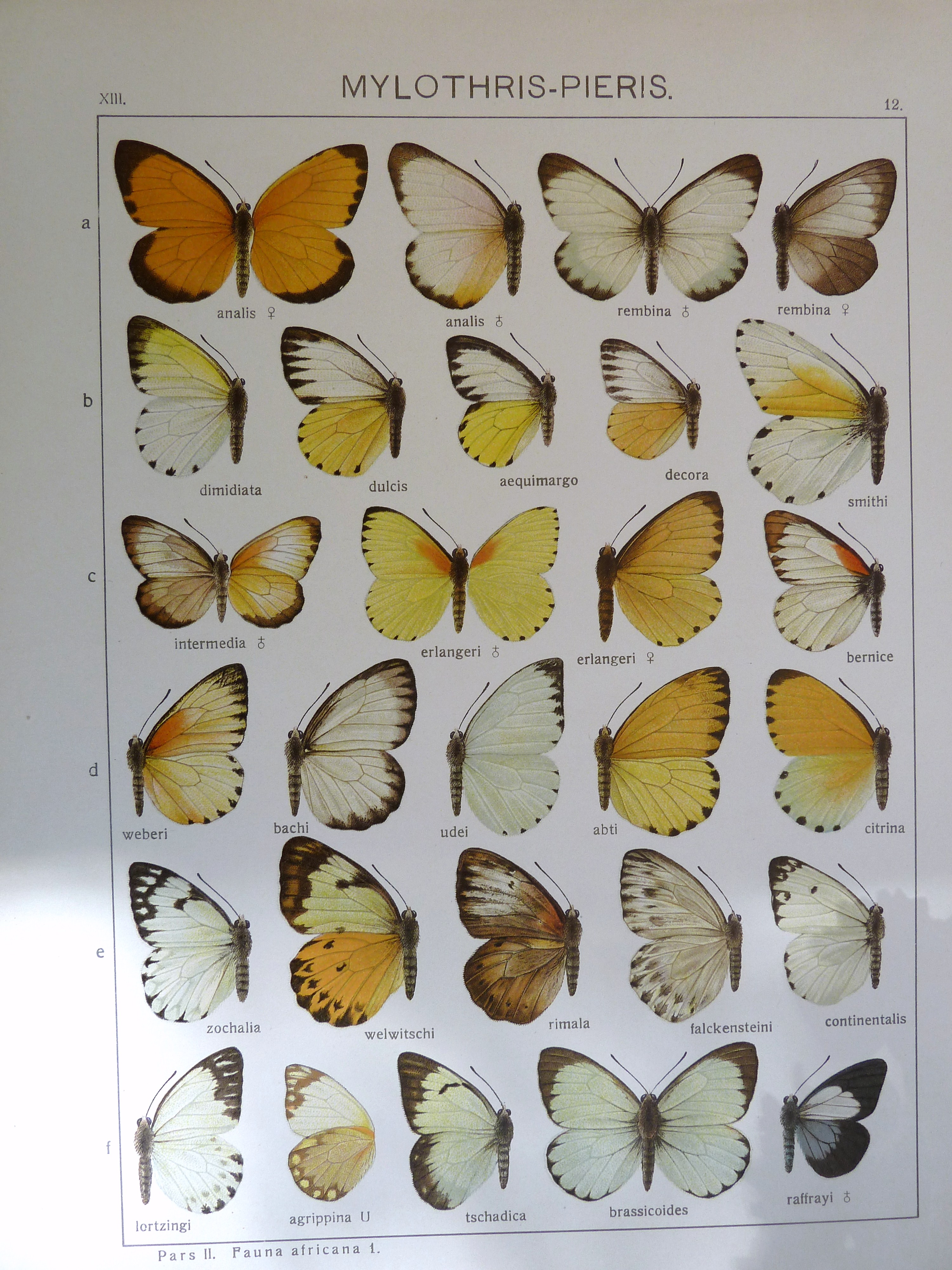
- in Seitz c

Scientific classification
- Kingdom: Animalia
- Phylum: Arthropoda
- Clade: Pancrustacea
- Class: Insecta
- Order: Lepidoptera
- Family: Pieridae
- Genus: Mylothris
- Species: M. erlangeri

Binomial name
- Mylothris erlangeri Pagenstecher, 1902

= Mylothris erlangeri =

Species of butterfly

Mylothris erlangeri is a butterfly in the family Pieridae. It is found in southern Ethiopia.
