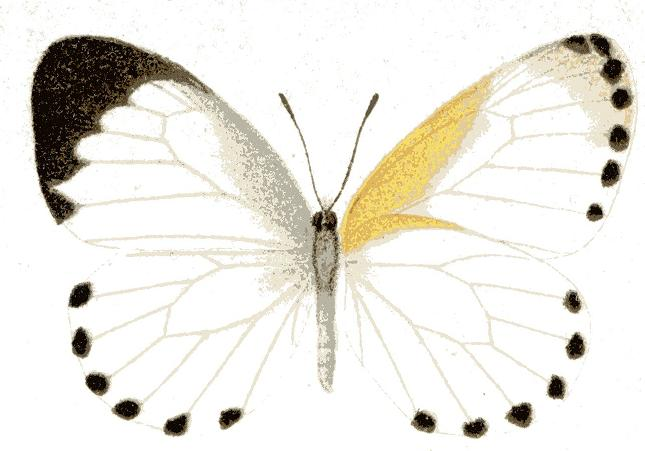

Scientific classification
- Kingdom: Animalia
- Phylum: Arthropoda
- Clade: Pancrustacea
- Class: Insecta
- Order: Lepidoptera
- Family: Pieridae
- Genus: Mylothris
- Species: M. sjostedti

Binomial name
- Mylothris sjostedti Aurivillius, 1895

Synonyms
- Mylothrys sjostedti hecqui Berger, 1952

= Mylothris sjostedti =

Species of butterfly

Mylothris sjostedti, Sjoestedt's dotted border, is a butterfly in the family Pieridae. It is found in Nigeria, Cameroon, the Democratic Republic of the Congo, Uganda, Burundi and Tanzania. The habitat consists of forests. The name honours Bror Yngve Sjöstedt.

== Subspecies ==
- Mylothris sjostedti sjostedti (Nigeria, Cameroon, Democratic Republic of the Congo)
- Mylothris sjostedti hecqui Berger, 1952 (Democratic Republic of the Congo, Uganda, Burundi, north-western Tanzania)
