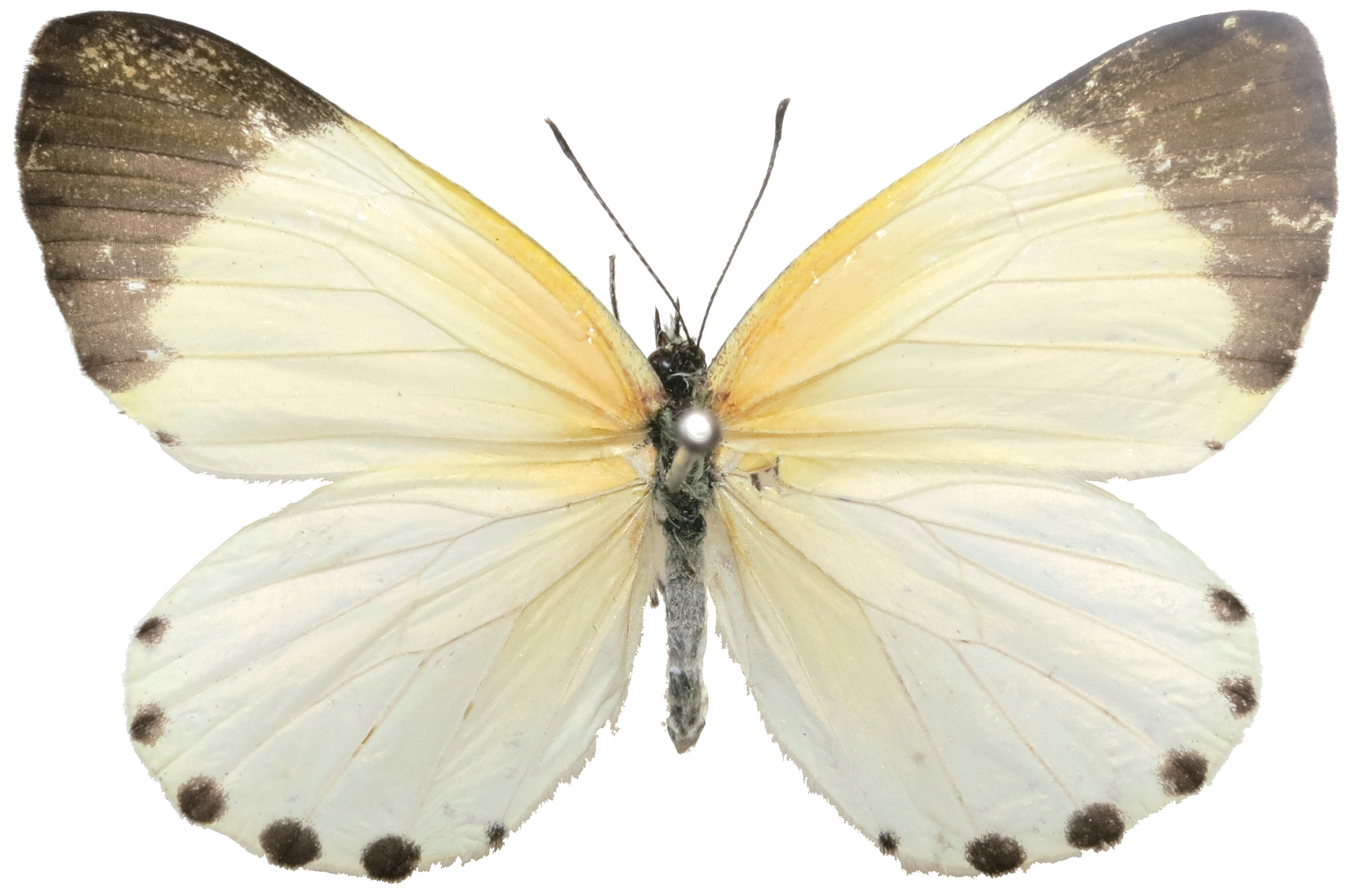
- Mylothris continua female - Kakamega county, Kenya

Scientific classification
- Kingdom: Animalia
- Phylum: Arthropoda
- Clade: Pancrustacea
- Class: Insecta
- Order: Lepidoptera
- Family: Pieridae
- Genus: Mylothris
- Species: M. continua

Binomial name
- Mylothris continua Talbot, 1944

Synonyms
- Mylothris poppea continua Talbot, 1944; Mylothris poppea ab. continua Aurivillius, 1910; Mylothris rhodope f. umbratica Talbot, 1932; Mylothris continua maxima f. panga Berger, 1981

= Mylothris continua =

Species of butterfly

Mylothris continua is a butterfly in the family Pieridae. It is found in Cameroon, the Republic of the Congo, the Democratic Republic of the Congo, Uganda, Kenya and Tanzania. The habitat consists of dense primary forests.

Adults have a slow flight and keep to the semi-shade of the forest. Occasionally they venture into forest clearings to feed at flowers. They have been observed mud-puddling.

== Subspecies ==
- Mylothris continua continua (Democratic Republic of the Congo, Uganda, western Kenya, north-western Tanzania)
- Mylothris continua maxima Berger, 1981 (Cameroon, Republic of the Congo, western Democratic Republic of the Congo)
