= Mylothris ochrea =

Scientific classification
- Kingdom: Animalia
- Phylum: Arthropoda
- Clade: Pancrustacea
- Class: Insecta
- Order: Lepidoptera
- Family: Pieridae
- Genus: Mylothris
- Species: M. ochrea

Binomial name
- Mylothris ochrea Berger, 1981

Synonyms
- Mylothris sjostedti f. ochrea Berger, 1952; Mylothris ochrea f. cedrata Berger, 1981; Mylothris ochrea f. nivea Berger, 1981

Species of butterfly

Mylothris ochrea is a butterfly in the family Pieridae. It is found in the Democratic Republic of the Congo (southern Kivu). The habitat consists of forests and forest margins.
