= Mylothris mafuga =

Scientific classification
- Kingdom: Animalia
- Phylum: Arthropoda
- Clade: Pancrustacea
- Class: Insecta
- Order: Lepidoptera
- Family: Pieridae
- Genus: Mylothris
- Species: M. mafuga

Binomial name
- Mylothris mafuga Berger, 1981

Species of butterfly

Mylothris mafuga is a butterfly in the family Pieridae. It is found in the Democratic Republic of Congo (eastern Kivu) and western Uganda. The habitat consists of forests and forest margins.
