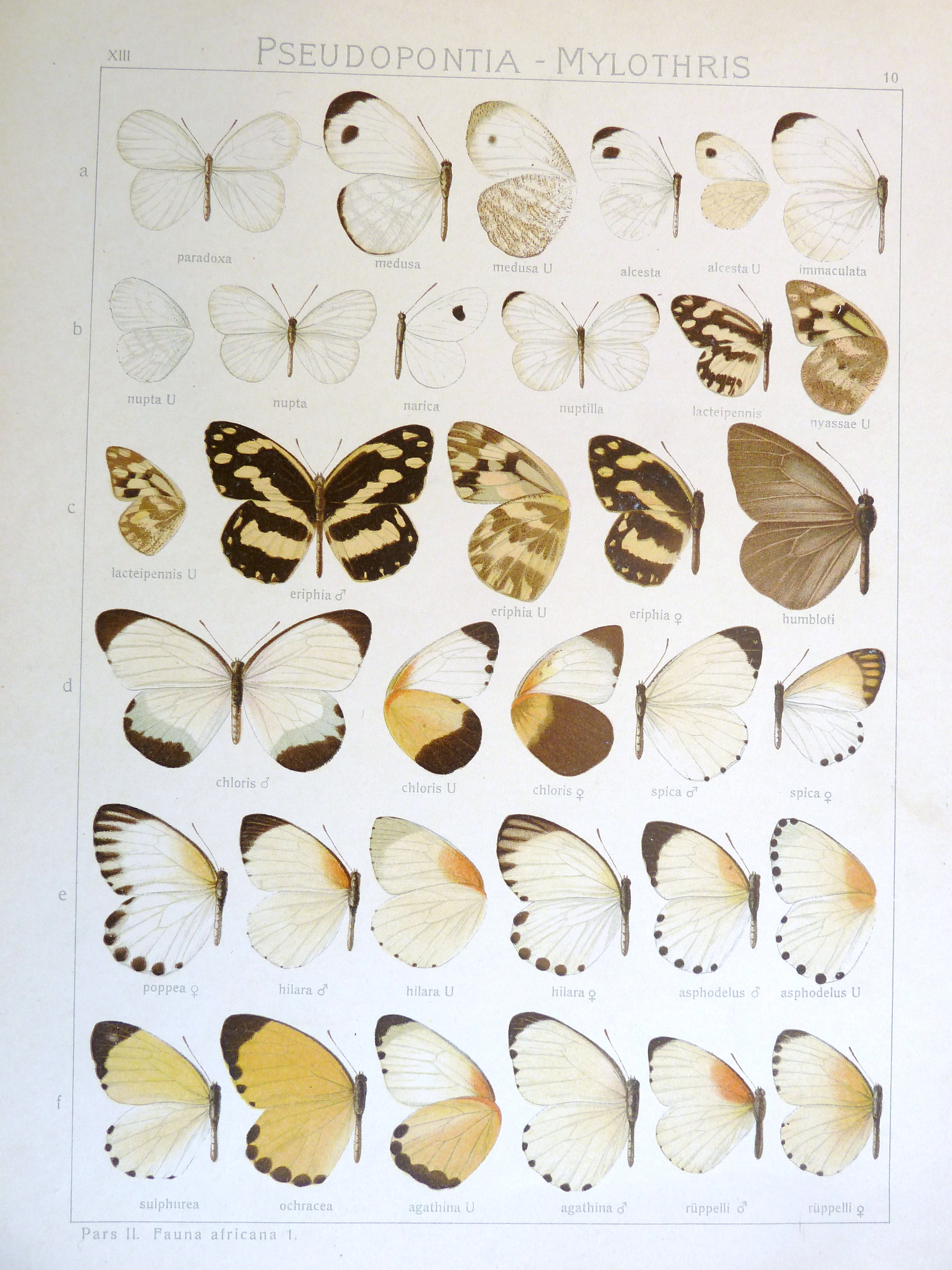

Scientific classification
- Kingdom: Animalia
- Phylum: Arthropoda
- Clade: Pancrustacea
- Class: Insecta
- Order: Lepidoptera
- Family: Pieridae
- Genus: Mylothris
- Species: M. humbloti

Binomial name
- Mylothris humbloti (Oberthür, 1888)

Synonyms
- Pieris humbloti Oberthür, 1888

= Mylothris humbloti =

Species of butterfly

Mylothris humbloti is a butterfly in the family Pieridae. It is found on the Comoros.
