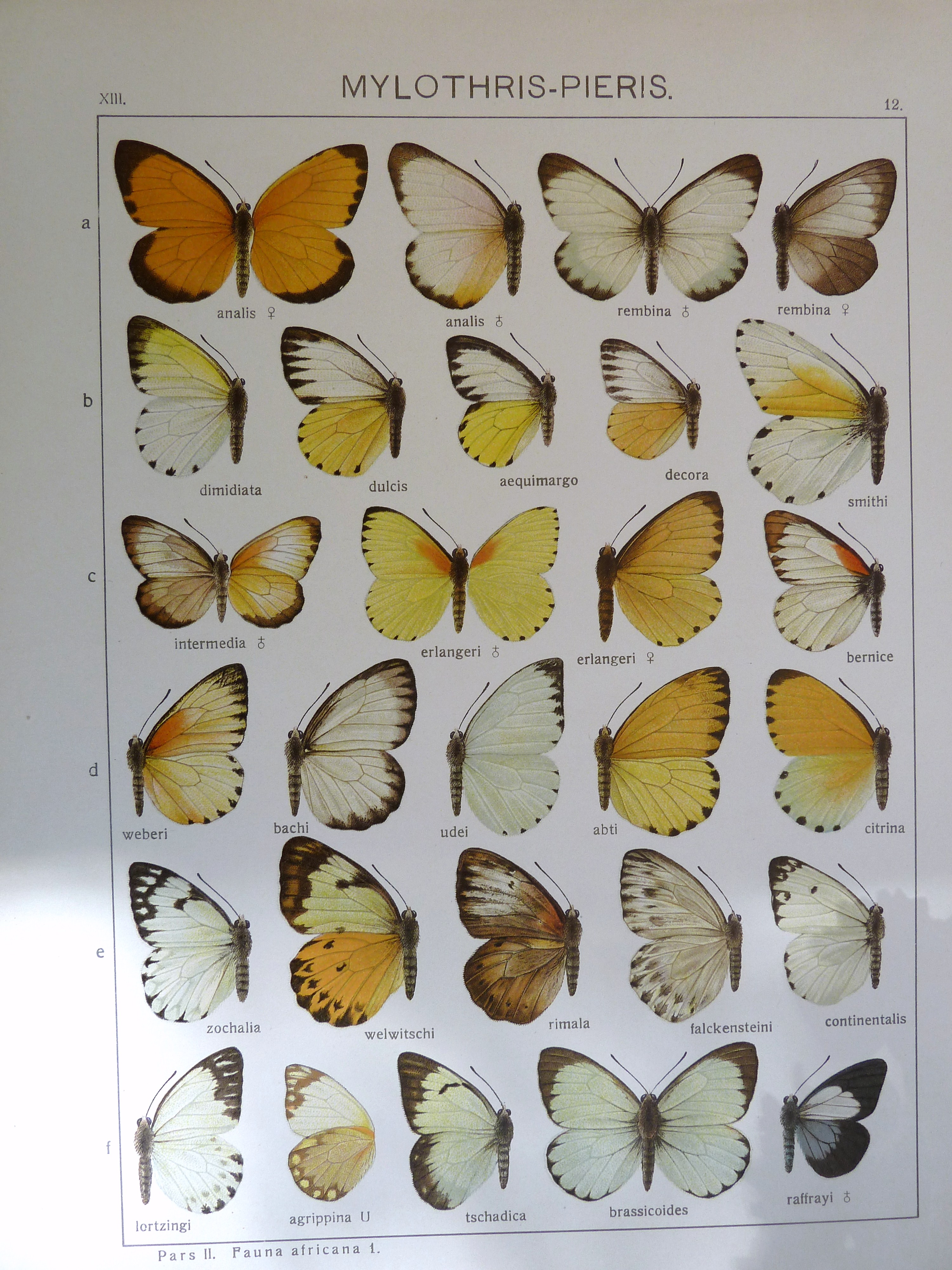
- in Seitz b

Scientific classification
- Kingdom: Animalia
- Phylum: Arthropoda
- Clade: Pancrustacea
- Class: Insecta
- Order: Lepidoptera
- Family: Pieridae
- Genus: Mylothris
- Species: M. dimidiata

Binomial name
- Mylothris dimidiata Aurivillius, 1898

Synonyms
- Mylothris sulphurea basalis f. pallescens Talbot, 1944

= Mylothris dimidiata =

Species of butterfly

Mylothris dimidiata, the western sulphur dotted border, is a butterfly in the family Pieridae. It is found in Guinea, Sierra Leone, Liberia, Ivory Coast and western Ghana. The habitat consists of dense forests.
