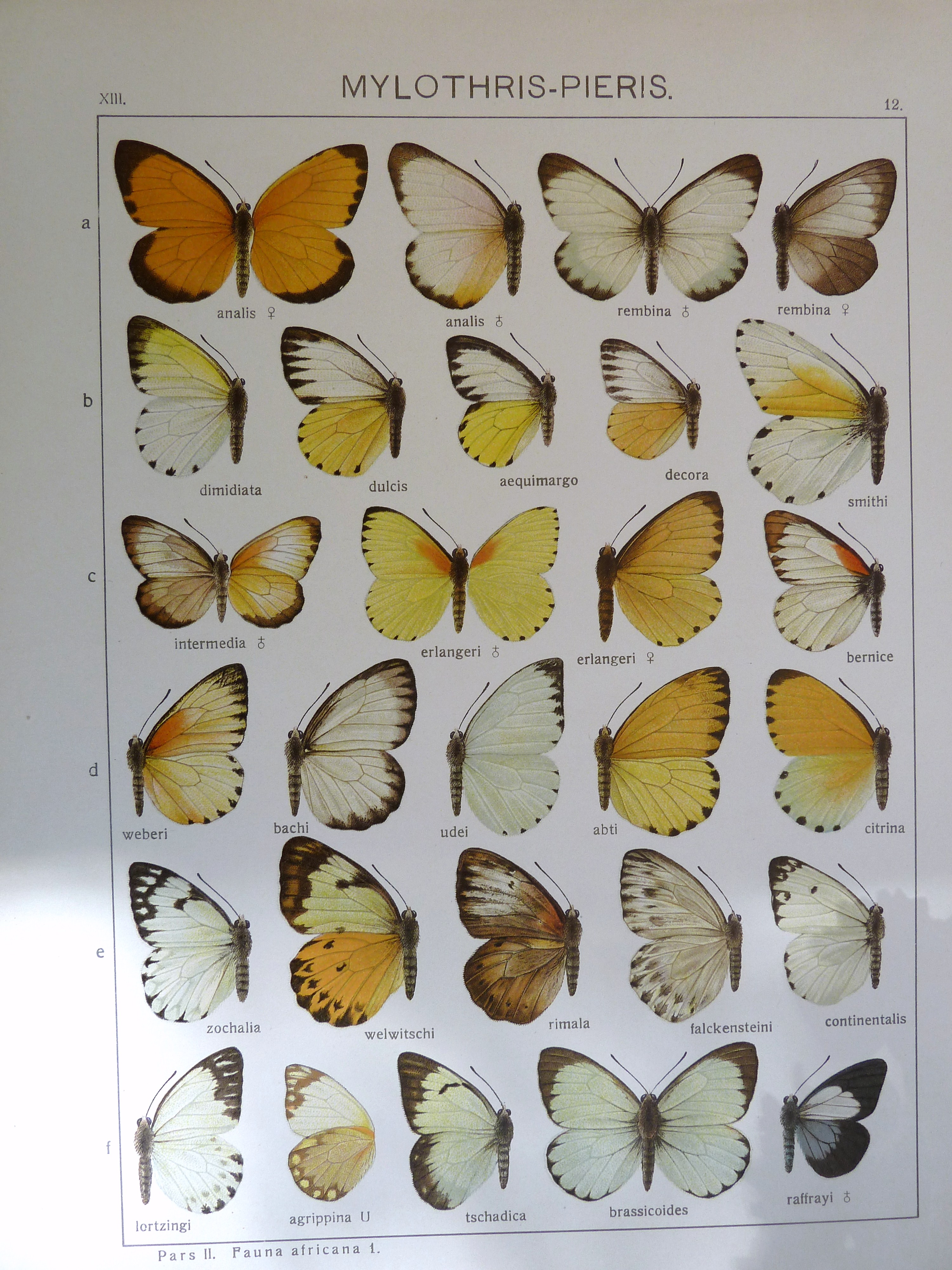
- in Seitz a

Scientific classification
- Kingdom: Animalia
- Phylum: Arthropoda
- Clade: Pancrustacea
- Class: Insecta
- Order: Lepidoptera
- Family: Pieridae
- Genus: Mylothris
- Species: M. rembina

Binomial name
- Mylothris rembina (Plötz, 1880)

Synonyms
- Pieris rembina Plötz, 1880; Mylothris subfusa Crowley, 1890; Mylothris camerunica Aurivillius, 1891; Mylothris chloris f. infuscata Bartel, 1905; Mylothris rembina f. fusca Bartel, 1905; Mylothris aneria Hulstaert, 1924; Mylothris rembina f. arctata Talbot, 1944; Mylothris rembina f. semifusca Talbot, 1944

= Mylothris rembina =

Species of butterfly

Mylothris rembina, the smoky dotted border, is a butterfly in the family Pieridae. It is found in Nigeria, Cameroon, Equatorial Guinea, Bioko, São Tomé and Príncipe, Gabon, the western part of the Democratic Republic of the Congo and northern Angola. The habitat consists of forests.

Adults have been recorded feeding on Lantana species.
