= Mylothris talboti =

Scientific classification
- Kingdom: Animalia
- Phylum: Arthropoda
- Clade: Pancrustacea
- Class: Insecta
- Order: Lepidoptera
- Family: Pieridae
- Genus: Mylothris
- Species: M. talboti

Binomial name
- Mylothris talboti Berger, 1980

Synonyms
- Mylothris yulei ertli f. talboti Berger, 1952

Species of butterfly

Mylothris talboti is a butterfly in the family Pieridae. It is found in eastern Tanzania. The habitat consists of lowland to submontane forests.

The larvae feed on Santalales species.
