= Mylothris alcuana =

Scientific classification
- Kingdom: Animalia
- Phylum: Arthropoda
- Clade: Pancrustacea
- Class: Insecta
- Order: Lepidoptera
- Family: Pieridae
- Genus: Mylothris
- Species: M. alcuana

Binomial name
- Mylothris alcuana Grünberg, 1910

Species of butterfly

Mylothris alcuana is a butterfly in the family Pieridae. It is found in Cameroon, Equatorial Guinea, the Republic of the Congo, the Democratic Republic of the Congo and Zambia. The habitat consists of rainforests.

== Subspecies ==
- Mylothris alcuana alcuana (Cameroon, Equatorial Guinea, Congo, northern Democratic Republic of the Congo)
- Mylothris alcuana binza Berger, 1981 (Democratic Republic of the Congo: Kinshasa, Sankuru)
- Mylothris alcuana shaba Berger, 1981 (Democratic Republic of the Congo (Kasai, Lualaba, Haut-Shaba), Zambia)
