= Mylothris pluviata =

Scientific classification
- Kingdom: Animalia
- Phylum: Arthropoda
- Clade: Pancrustacea
- Class: Insecta
- Order: Lepidoptera
- Family: Pieridae
- Genus: Mylothris
- Species: M. pluviata

Binomial name
- Mylothris pluviata Berger, 1980

Synonyms
- Mylothris poppea rhodesiana f. pluviata Talbot, 1944

Species of butterfly

Mylothris pluviata is a butterfly in the family Pieridae. It is found in eastern Tanzania. The habitat consists of submontane and montane forests.
