= Mylothris arabicus =

Scientific classification
- Kingdom: Animalia
- Phylum: Arthropoda
- Clade: Pancrustacea
- Class: Insecta
- Order: Lepidoptera
- Family: Pieridae
- Genus: Mylothris
- Species: M. arabicus

Binomial name
- Mylothris arabicus Gabriel, 1954

Species of butterfly

Mylothris arabicus is a butterfly in the family Pieridae. It is found in south-western Yemen and Saudi Arabia (up to 'Asir).

Egg clusters were found Loranthus species, which is probably the food plant.
