= Mylothris lucens =

Scientific classification
- Kingdom: Animalia
- Phylum: Arthropoda
- Clade: Pancrustacea
- Class: Insecta
- Order: Lepidoptera
- Family: Pieridae
- Genus: Mylothris
- Species: M. lucens

Binomial name
- Mylothris lucens Hecq, 2005

Species of butterfly

Mylothris lucens is a butterfly in the family Pieridae. It is found in Nigeria.
