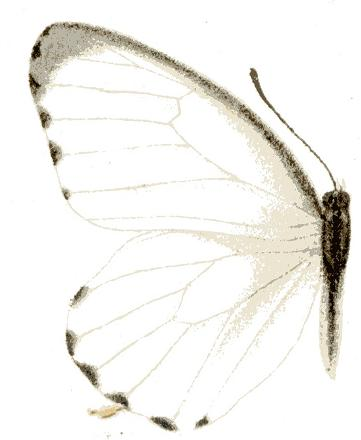
- Male
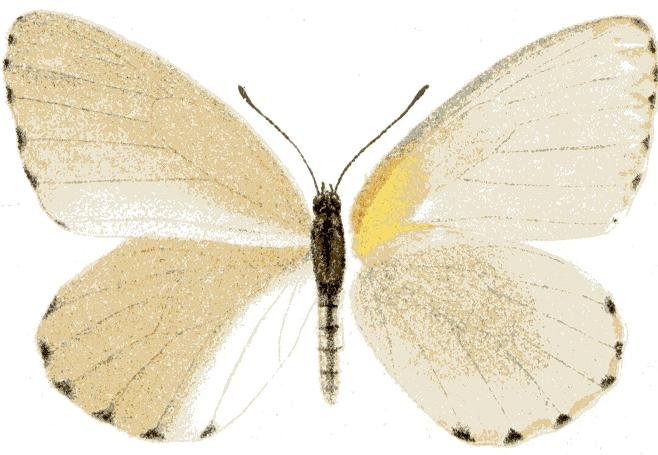
- Female

Scientific classification
- Kingdom: Animalia
- Phylum: Arthropoda
- Clade: Pancrustacea
- Class: Insecta
- Order: Lepidoptera
- Family: Pieridae
- Genus: Mylothris
- Species: M. nubila

Binomial name
- Mylothris nubila (Möschler, 1884)

Synonyms
- Tachyris poppea var. nubila Möschler, 1884; Mylothris canescens Joicey & Talbot, 1922; Mylothris pernaria Hulstaert, 1924; Mylothris nubila canescens f. nivescens Berger, 1954

= Mylothris nubila =

Species of butterfly

Mylothris nubila is a butterfly in the family Pieridae. It is found in Cameroon, Gabon, São Tomé and Príncipe, the Democratic Republic of the Congo and Uganda.

The larvae feed on Santalales species.

== Subspecies ==
- M. n. nubila (Cameroon, Gabon, São Tomé and Príncipe)
- M. n. canescens Joicey & Talbot, 1922 (Democratic Republic of the Congo)
- M. n. fontainei Berger, 1952 (Democratic Republic of the Congo)
- M. n. somereni Talbot, 1946 (Uganda: western slopes of Mount Elgon)
