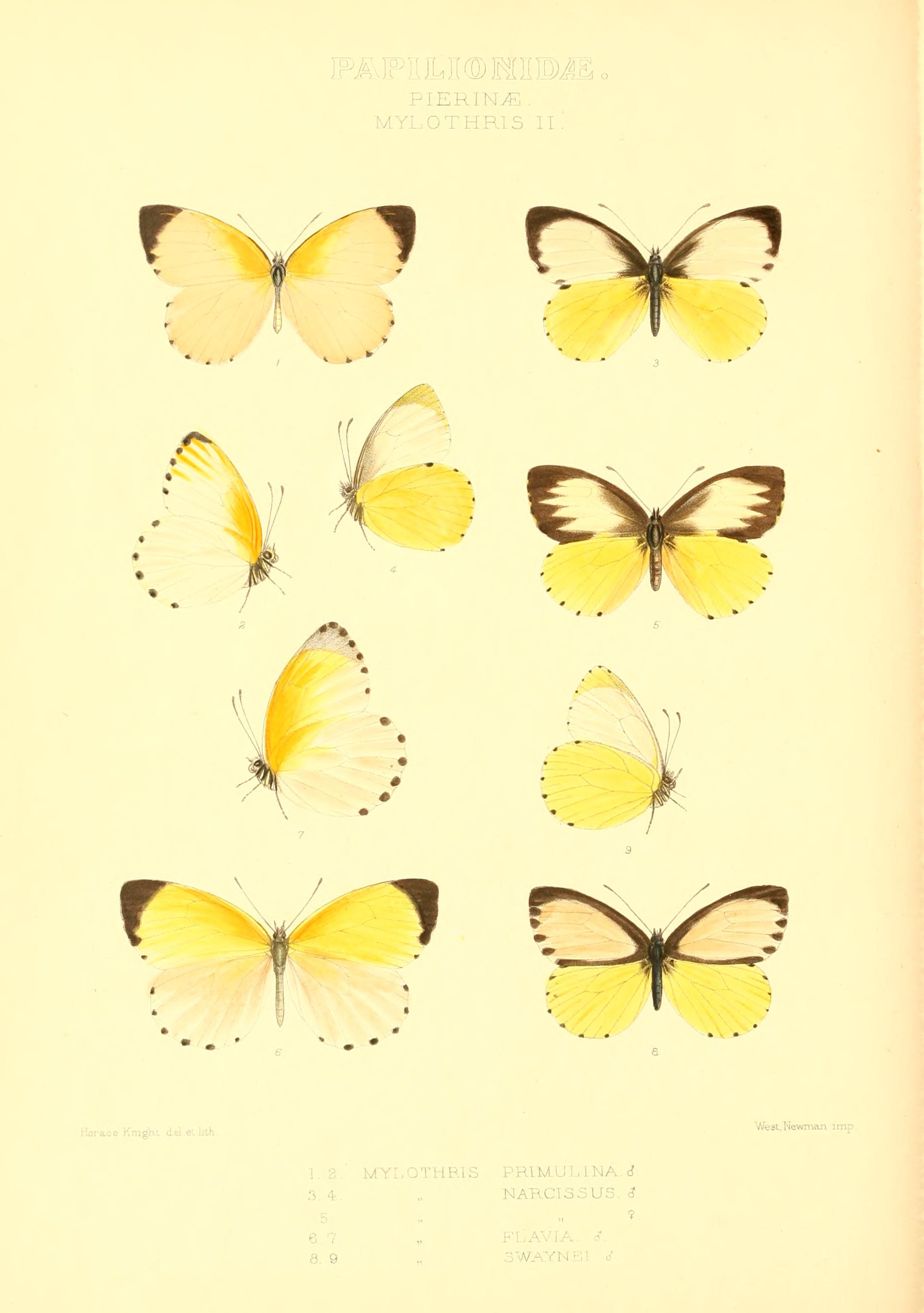
- Figures 6 and 7

Scientific classification
- Kingdom: Animalia
- Phylum: Arthropoda
- Clade: Pancrustacea
- Class: Insecta
- Order: Lepidoptera
- Family: Pieridae
- Genus: Mylothris
- Species: M. sulphurea

Binomial name
- Mylothris sulphurea Aurivillius, 1895

Synonyms
- Mylothris flavia Grose-Smith & Kirby, 1900; Mylothris beethoveni Suffert, 1904; Mylothris semiflava Schultze, 1914

= Mylothris sulphurea =

Species of butterfly

Mylothris sulphurea, the sulphur dotted border, is a butterfly in the family Pieridae. It is found in eastern Nigeria and western Cameroon. The habitat consists of dense forests.

The larvae feed on Santalales species.
