= Mylothris carcassoni =

Scientific classification
- Kingdom: Animalia
- Phylum: Arthropoda
- Clade: Pancrustacea
- Class: Insecta
- Order: Lepidoptera
- Family: Pieridae
- Genus: Mylothris
- Species: M. carcassoni

Binomial name
- Mylothris carcassoni van Son, 1948

Species of butterfly

Mylothris carcassoni, the Carcasson's dotted border, is a butterfly in the family Pieridae. It is found in Zimbabwe, where it is known only from the type locality (Butler North, south of Mutare). The habitat consists of gallery forests.

Adults have been recorded in September and March.
