= Mylothris schoutedeni =

Scientific classification
- Kingdom: Animalia
- Phylum: Arthropoda
- Clade: Pancrustacea
- Class: Insecta
- Order: Lepidoptera
- Family: Pieridae
- Genus: Mylothris
- Species: M. schoutedeni

Binomial name
- Mylothris schoutedeni Berger, 1952

Species of butterfly

Mylothris schoutedeni is a butterfly in the family Pieridae. It is found in the Democratic Republic of the Congo. The habitat consists of forests.
