= Mylothris celisi =

Scientific classification
- Kingdom: Animalia
- Phylum: Arthropoda
- Clade: Pancrustacea
- Class: Insecta
- Order: Lepidoptera
- Family: Pieridae
- Genus: Mylothris
- Species: M. celisi

Binomial name
- Mylothris celisi Berger, 1981

Species of butterfly

Mylothris celisi is a butterfly in the family Pieridae. It is found in the Democratic Republic of Congo. The habitat consists of forests and forest margins.
