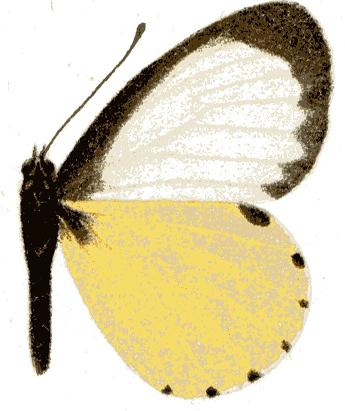

Scientific classification
- Kingdom: Animalia
- Phylum: Arthropoda
- Clade: Pancrustacea
- Class: Insecta
- Order: Lepidoptera
- Family: Pieridae
- Genus: Mylothris
- Species: M. crawshayi

Binomial name
- Mylothris crawshayi Butler, 1896

Synonyms
- Mylothris crawshayi f. iringa Berger, 1985

= Mylothris crawshayi =

Species of butterfly

Mylothris crawshayi is a butterfly in the family Pieridae. It is found in Malawi, Zambia and Tanzania. The habitat consists of montane forests and montane forest-grassland mosaic.

Adults have a fast flight compared to other Mylothris species.

The larvae feed on Santalales species and Phragmanthera usuiensis.

== Subspecies ==
- Mylothris crawshayi crawshayi (northern Malawi, eastern Zambia)
- Mylothris crawshayi bunduki Berger, 1980 (eastern Tanzania)
