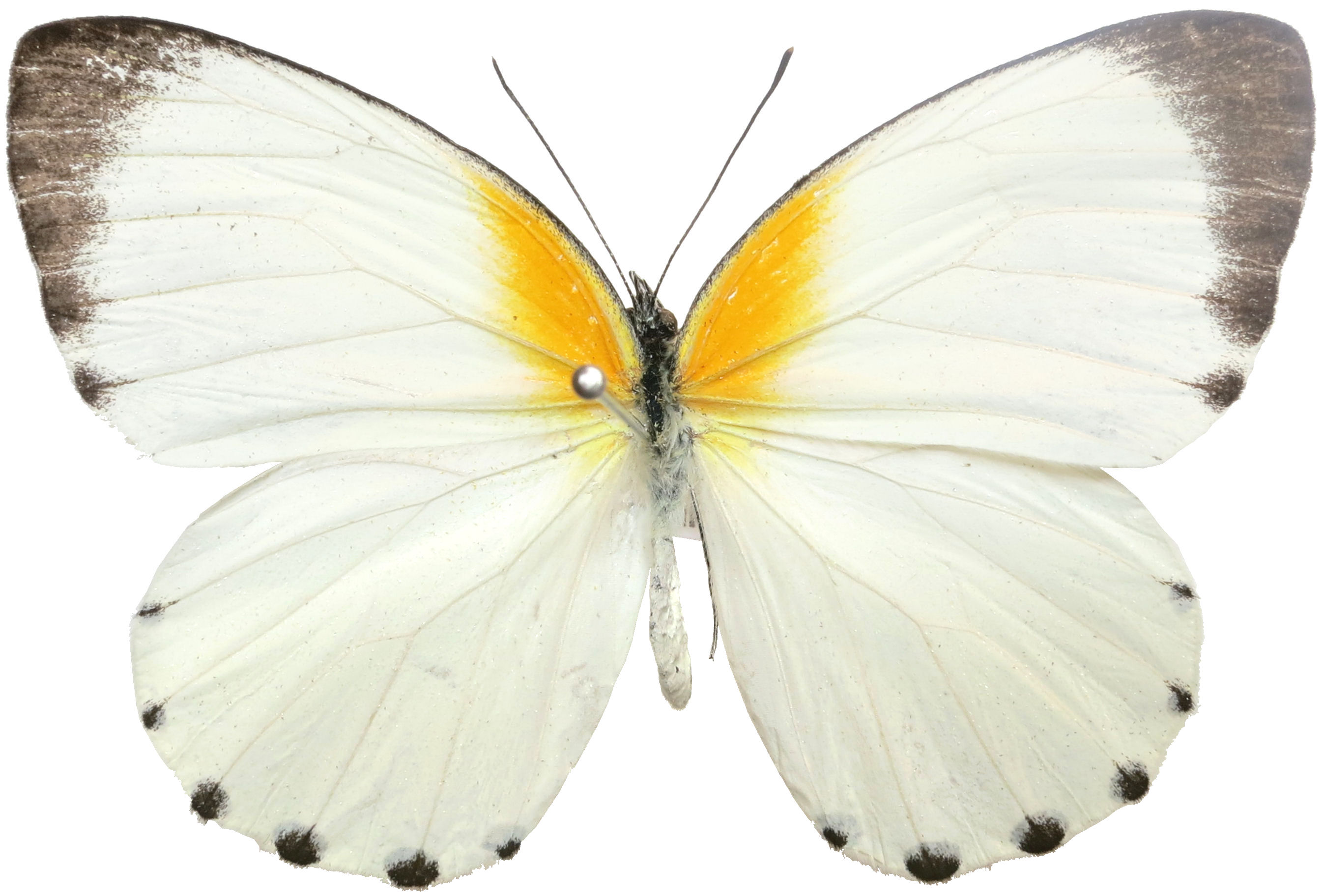
- Mylothris poppea male - Ashanti Region, Ghana

Scientific classification
- Kingdom: Animalia
- Phylum: Arthropoda
- Clade: Pancrustacea
- Class: Insecta
- Order: Lepidoptera
- Family: Pieridae
- Genus: Mylothris
- Species: M. poppea

Binomial name
- Mylothris poppea (Cramer, 1777)

Synonyms
- Papilio poppea Cramer, 1777; Mylothris dubia Aurivillius, 1907; Mylothris hilara f. limbonotata Strand, 1913; Mylothris hilara ab. conflua Strand, 1913; Mylothris alcuana ab. excavata Strand, 1913; Mylothris poppea hilara f. trimacula Talbot, 1944; Mylothris poppea poppea ab. pseudospica Dufrane, 1947

= Mylothris poppea =

Species of butterfly

Mylothris poppea, the Poppea dotted border, is a butterfly in the family Pieridae. It is found in Guinea, Sierra Leone, Liberia, Ivory Coast, Ghana and Togo. The habitat consists of forests, penetrating riverine and drier forest areas.

The larvae feed on Loranthaceae species.

Torben Larsen developed a species numbering system for his 2005 publication Butterflies of West Africa. This species is #106. The 'Larsen' numbers have since been used with permission in A Sharp Eye on Butterflies of Ghana.
