= Mylothris splendens =

Scientific classification
- Kingdom: Animalia
- Phylum: Arthropoda
- Clade: Pancrustacea
- Class: Insecta
- Order: Lepidoptera
- Family: Pieridae
- Genus: Mylothris
- Species: M. splendens

Binomial name
- Mylothris splendens Le Cerf, 1927

Synonyms
- Mylothris audeoudi Riley, 1930; Mylothris audeoudi f. bicolor Riley, 1930; Mylothris audeoudi f. unicolor Riley, 1930

Species of butterfly

Mylothris splendens is a butterfly in the family Pieridae. It is found in the forests of Madagascar.
