= Mylothris elodina =

Scientific classification
- Kingdom: Animalia
- Phylum: Arthropoda
- Clade: Pancrustacea
- Class: Insecta
- Order: Lepidoptera
- Family: Pieridae
- Genus: Mylothris
- Species: M. elodina

Binomial name
- Mylothris elodina Talbot, 1944

Species of butterfly

Mylothris elodina is a butterfly in the family Pieridae. It is found in Cameroon, Gabon, Angola and the Democratic Republic of Congo.

== Subspecies ==
- Mylothris elodina elodina (Cameroon, Gabon)
- Mylothris elodina diva Berger, 1954 (Angola, the Democratic Republic of Congo)
- Mylothris elodina pelenge Berger, 1981 (Democratic Republic of Congo: Shaba)
