= Mylothris kiellandi =

Scientific classification
- Kingdom: Animalia
- Phylum: Arthropoda
- Clade: Pancrustacea
- Class: Insecta
- Order: Lepidoptera
- Family: Pieridae
- Genus: Mylothris
- Species: M. kiellandi

Binomial name
- Mylothris kiellandi Berger, 1985

Species of butterfly

Mylothris kiellandi is a butterfly in the family Pieridae. It is found in Tanzania (western Usambara). The habitat consists of montane evergreen forests.
