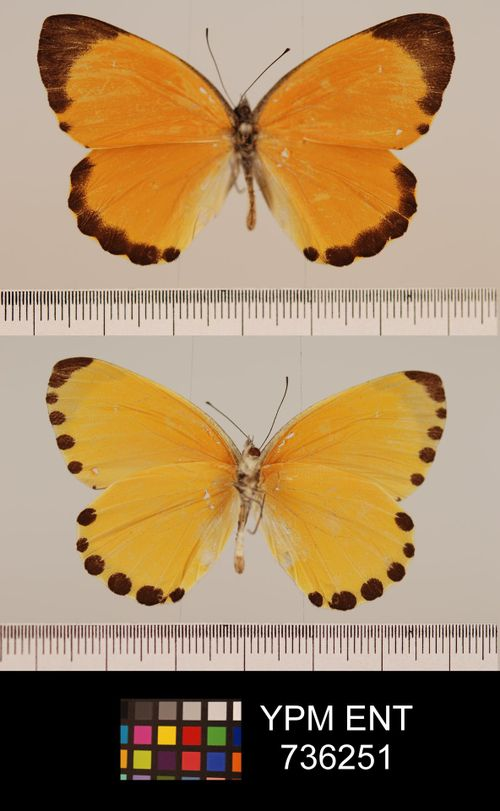

Scientific classification
- Kingdom: Animalia
- Phylum: Arthropoda
- Clade: Pancrustacea
- Class: Insecta
- Order: Lepidoptera
- Family: Pieridae
- Genus: Mylothris
- Species: M. ochracea

Binomial name
- Mylothris ochracea Aurivillius, 1895

= Mylothris ochracea =

Ochreous dotted border

Species of butterfly

Mylothris ochracea, the ochreous dotted border, is a butterfly in the family Pieridae. It is found in Nigeria and Cameroon. The habitat consists of primary forests.

The larvae feed on Santalales species.
