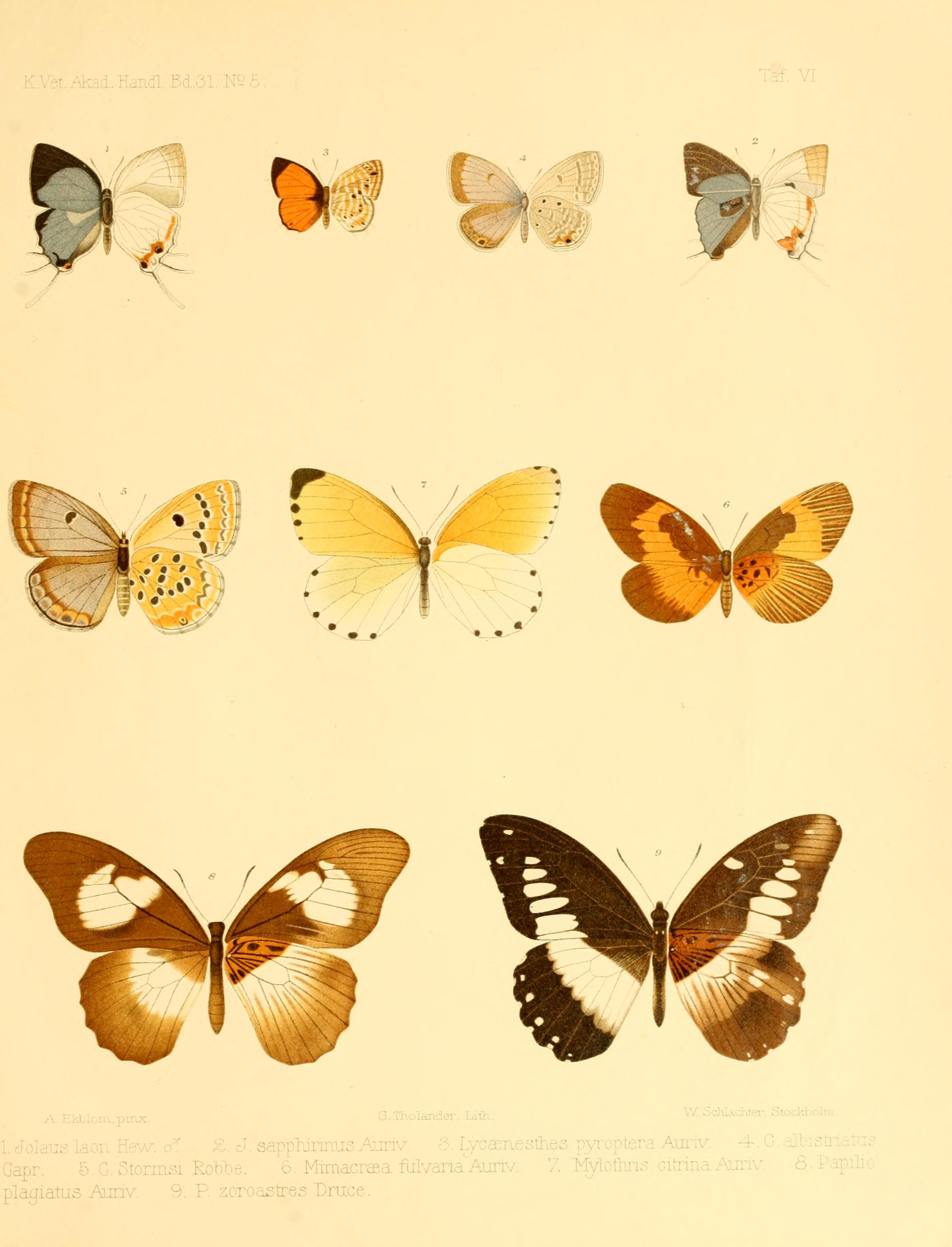
- in Rhopalocera Aethiopica Aurivillius, 1899

Scientific classification
- Kingdom: Animalia
- Phylum: Arthropoda
- Clade: Pancrustacea
- Class: Insecta
- Order: Lepidoptera
- Family: Pieridae
- Genus: Mylothris
- Species: M. citrina

Binomial name
- Mylothris citrina Aurivillius, 1898

= Mylothris citrina =

Species of butterfly

Mylothris citrina is a butterfly in the family Pieridae. It is found in Uganda, the Democratic Republic of Congo and Tanzania. The habitat consists of forests.

== Subspecies ==
- Mylothris citrina citrina (north-eastern Tanzania)
- Mylothris citrina holochroma Talbot, 1944 (Democratic Republic of Congo)
- Mylothris citrina orientalis Talbot, 1946 (Uganda)
