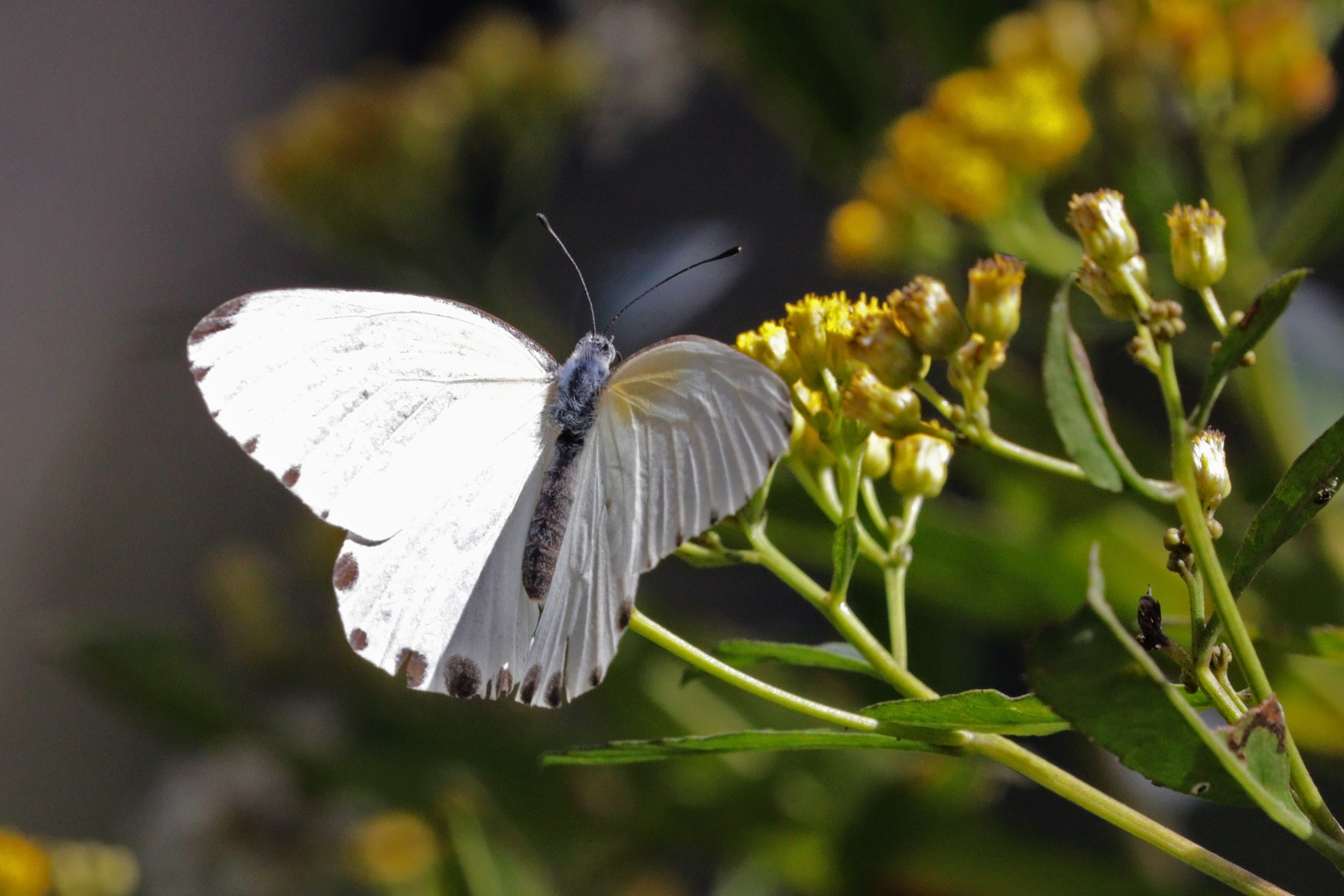

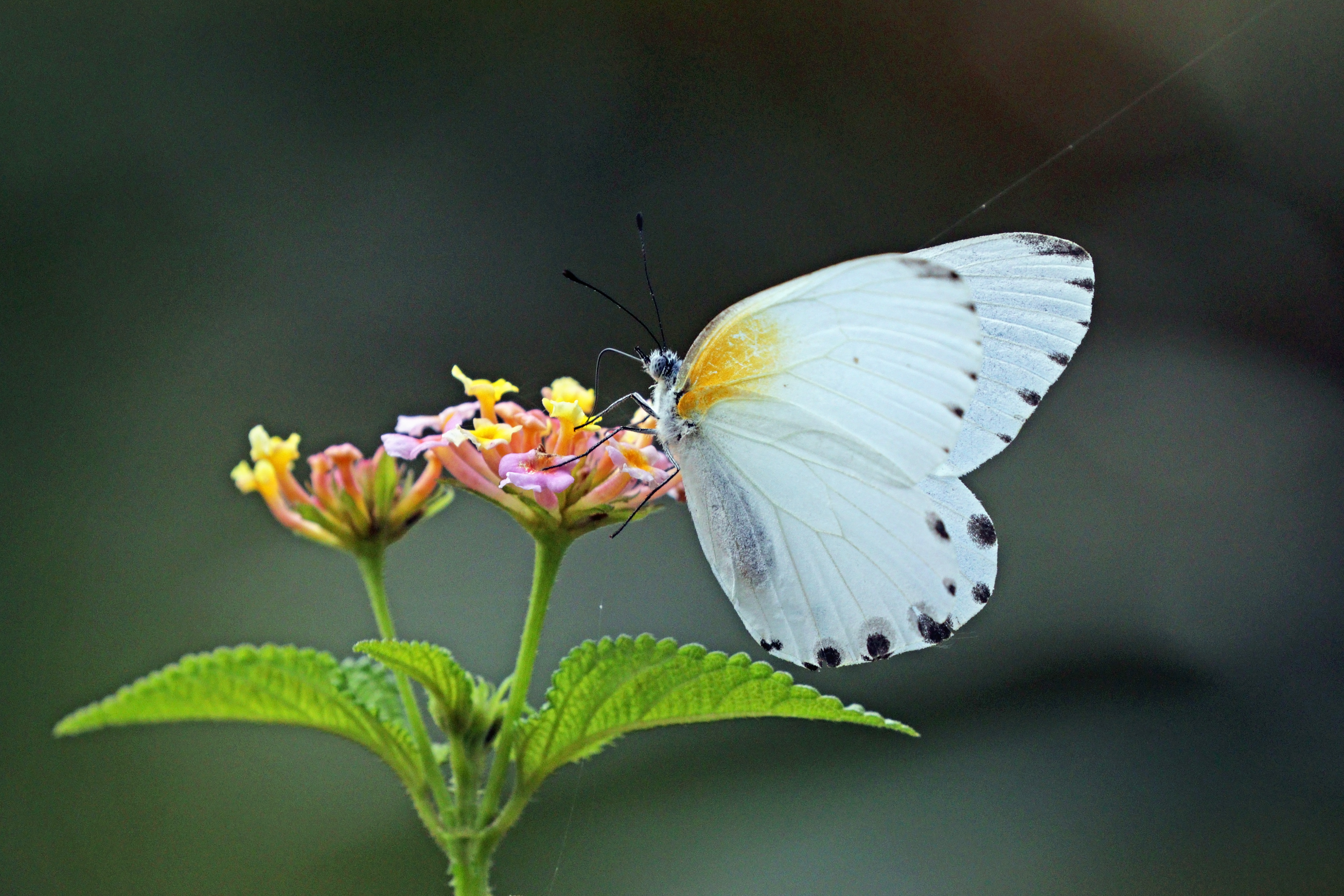
- both at Andasibe-Mantadia National Park, Madagascar

Scientific classification
- Kingdom: Animalia
- Phylum: Arthropoda
- Clade: Pancrustacea
- Class: Insecta
- Order: Lepidoptera
- Family: Pieridae
- Genus: Mylothris
- Species: M. phileris

Binomial name
- Mylothris phileris (Boisduval, 1833)

Synonyms
- Pieris phileris Boisduval, 1833; Mylothris agathina thinaga Suffert, 1904; Pieris phileris f. aurata Oberthür, 1923; Pieris phileris f. flavescens Oberthür, 1923

= Mylothris phileris =

Species of butterfly

Mylothris phileris is a butterfly in the family Pieridae. It is found in Madagascar. The habitat consists of forests.
