= Mylothris leonora =

Scientific classification
- Kingdom: Animalia
- Phylum: Arthropoda
- Clade: Pancrustacea
- Class: Insecta
- Order: Lepidoptera
- Family: Pieridae
- Genus: Mylothris
- Species: M. leonora

Binomial name
- Mylothris leonora Krüger, 1928

Synonyms
- Mylothris leonora f. bondwa Berger, 1985

Species of butterfly

Mylothris leonora is a butterfly in the family Pieridae. It is found in Tanzania (Uluguru Mountains). The habitat consists of montane forests and forest-grassland mosaic.
