= Mylothris knoopi =

Scientific classification
- Kingdom: Animalia
- Phylum: Arthropoda
- Clade: Pancrustacea
- Class: Insecta
- Order: Lepidoptera
- Family: Pieridae
- Genus: Mylothris
- Species: M. knoopi

Binomial name
- Mylothris knoopi Hecq, 2005

Species of butterfly

Mylothris knoopi is a butterfly in the family Pieridae. It is found in Nigeria.
