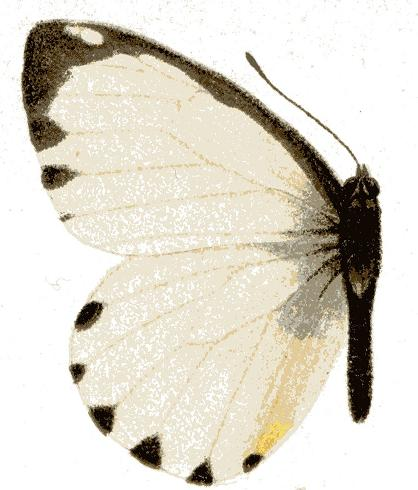
- Male
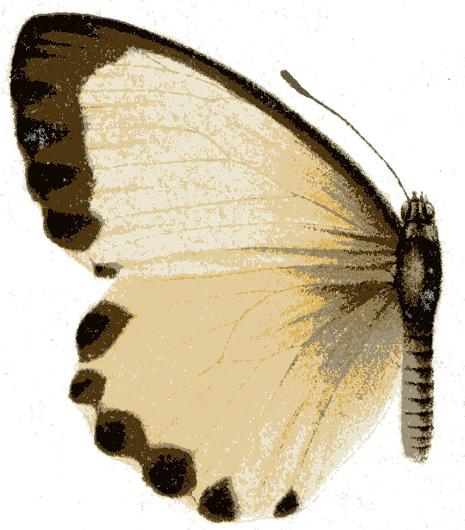
- Female

Scientific classification
- Kingdom: Animalia
- Phylum: Arthropoda
- Clade: Pancrustacea
- Class: Insecta
- Order: Lepidoptera
- Family: Pieridae
- Genus: Mylothris
- Species: M. ngaziya

Binomial name
- Mylothris ngaziya Oberthür, 1888

Synonyms
- Pieris ngaziya Oberthür, 1888; Mylothris nagaziya f. albunea Talbot, 1944

= Mylothris ngaziya =

Species of butterfly

Mylothris ngaziya is a butterfly in the family Pieridae. It is found on the Comoros.
