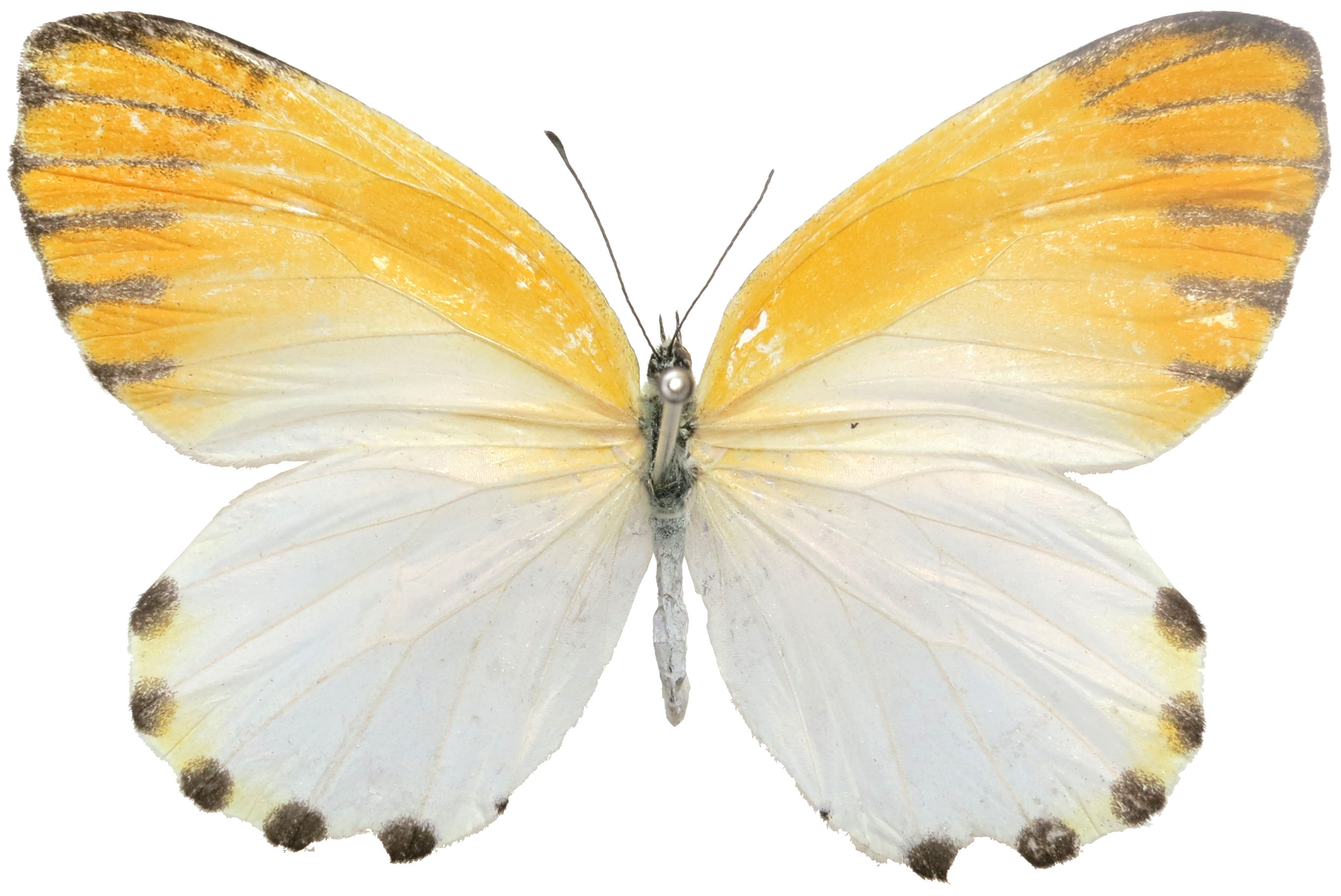
- Mylothris jaopura female - Ashanti Region, Ghana

Scientific classification
- Kingdom: Animalia
- Phylum: Arthropoda
- Clade: Pancrustacea
- Class: Insecta
- Order: Lepidoptera
- Family: Pieridae
- Genus: Mylothris
- Species: M. jaopura

Binomial name
- Mylothris jaopura Karsch, 1893

= Mylothris jaopura =

Karsch's dotted border

Species of butterfly

Mylothris jaopura, Karsch's dotted border, is a butterfly in the family Pieridae. It is found in Ivory Coast, Ghana, Togo, southern Nigeria, western Cameroon and possibly Liberia.The habitat consists of forests and occasionally dense Guinea savanna. It is also found in disturbed habitats such as suburban gardens.

The larvae feed on Loranthaceae species.

Torben Larsen developed a species numbering system for his 2005 publication Butterflies of West Africa. This species is #110. The 'Larsen' numbers have since been used with permission in A Sharp Eye on Butterflies of Ghana.
