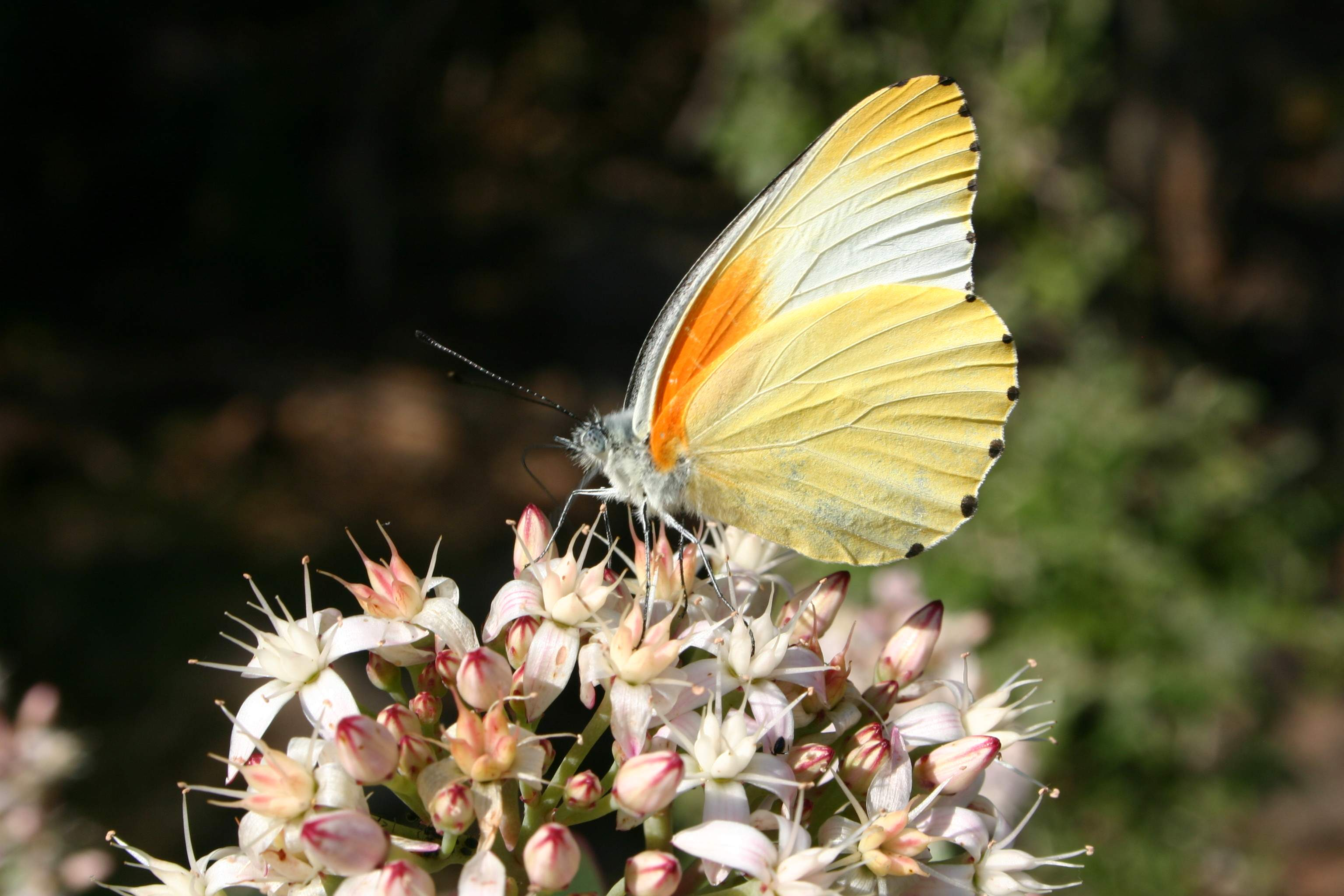
- Common dotted border (Mylothris agathina)

Scientific classification
- Kingdom: Animalia
- Phylum: Arthropoda
- Clade: Pancrustacea
- Class: Insecta
- Order: Lepidoptera
- Family: Pieridae
- Subfamily: Pierinae
- Tribe: Pierini
- Genus: Mylothris; Hübner, [1819]

Species
- See text

= Mylothris =

Genus of butterflies

Mylothris, commonly called dotted borders, is a genus of pierid butterflies found in Africa.

== Species ==
Listed alphabetically within groups:

The chloris species group:

- Mylothris agathina (Cramer, [1779]) – eastern dotted border or common dotted border
- Mylothris arabicus Gabriel, 1954
- Mylothris asphodelus Butler, 1888
- Mylothris chloris (Fabricius, 1775) – western dotted border or common dotted border
- Mylothris continua Aurivillius, 1910
- Mylothris poppea (Cramer, [1777])
- Mylothris rhodope (Fabricius, 1775) – tropical dotted border or Rhodope

The trimenia species group:

- Mylothris croceus Butler, 1896
- Mylothris smithii (Mabille, 1879)
- Mylothris splendens Le Cerf, 1927
- Mylothris trimenia Butler, 1869 – Trimen's dotted border

The sagala species group:

- Mylothris jacksoni Sharpe, 1891 – Jackson's dotted border
- Mylothris sagala Grose-Smith, 1886 – dusky dotted border

The bernice species group:

- Mylothris bernice (Hewitson, [1866])
- Mylothris carcassoni van Son, 1948

Ungrouped:

- Mylothris aburi Larsen & Collins, 2003
- Mylothris alberici Dufrane, 1940
- Mylothris alcuana Grünberg, 1910
- Mylothris atewa Berger, 1980 – Atewa dotted border
- Mylothris basalis Aurivillius, 1906
- Mylothris celisi Berger, 1981
- Mylothris citrina Aurivillius, 1898
- Mylothris crawshayi Butler, 1896
- Mylothris dimidiata Aurivillius, 1898
- Mylothris ducarmei Hecq, 2001
- Mylothris elodina Talbot, 1944
- Mylothris erlangeri Pagenstecher, 1902
- Mylothris ertli Suffert, 1904
- Mylothris eximia Hecq, 2005
- Mylothris flaviana Grose-Smith, 1898
- Mylothris hilara (Karsch, 1892)
- Mylothris humbloti (Oberthür, 1888)
- Mylothris jaopura Karsch, 1893
- Mylothris kahusiana Hecq, 2001
- Mylothris kiellandi Berger, 1985
- Mylothris kilimensis Kielland, 1990
- Mylothris kiwuensis Grünberg, 1910
- Mylothris knoopi Hecq, 2005
- Mylothris leonora Krüger, 1928
- Mylothris lucens Hecq, 2005
- Mylothris mafuga Berger, 1981
- Mylothris mavunda Hancock & Heath, 1985
- Mylothris mortoni Blachier, 1912
- Mylothris ngaziya Oberthür, 1888
- Mylothris nubila (Möschler, 1884)
- Mylothris ochracea Aurivillius, 1895
- Mylothris ochrea Berger, 1981
- Mylothris phileris (Boisduval, 1833)
- Mylothris pluviata Berger, 1980
- Mylothris polychroma Berger, 1981
- Mylothris primulina Butler, 1897
- Mylothris rembina (Plötz, 1880)
- Mylothris ruandana Strand, 1909
- Mylothris rubricosta Mabille, 1890
- Mylothris rueppellii (Koch, 1865) – Rüppell's dotted border or twin dotted border
- Mylothris schoutedeni Berger, 1952
- Mylothris schumanni Suffert, 1904
- Mylothris similis Lathy, 1906
- Mylothris sjostedti Aurivillius, 1895
- Mylothris spica (Möschler, 1884)
- Mylothris subsolana Hecq, 2001
- Mylothris sulphurea Aurivillius, 1895
- Mylothris superbus Kielland, 1985
- Mylothris talboti Berger, 1980
- Mylothris yulei Butler, 1897 – Yule's dotted border
