= Mylothris subsolana =

Scientific classification
- Kingdom: Animalia
- Phylum: Arthropoda
- Clade: Pancrustacea
- Class: Insecta
- Order: Lepidoptera
- Family: Pieridae
- Genus: Mylothris
- Species: M. subsolana

Binomial name
- Mylothris subsolana Hecq, 2001

Species of butterfly

Mylothris subsolana is a butterfly in the family Pieridae. It is found in the Democratic Republic of the Congo and Uganda.
