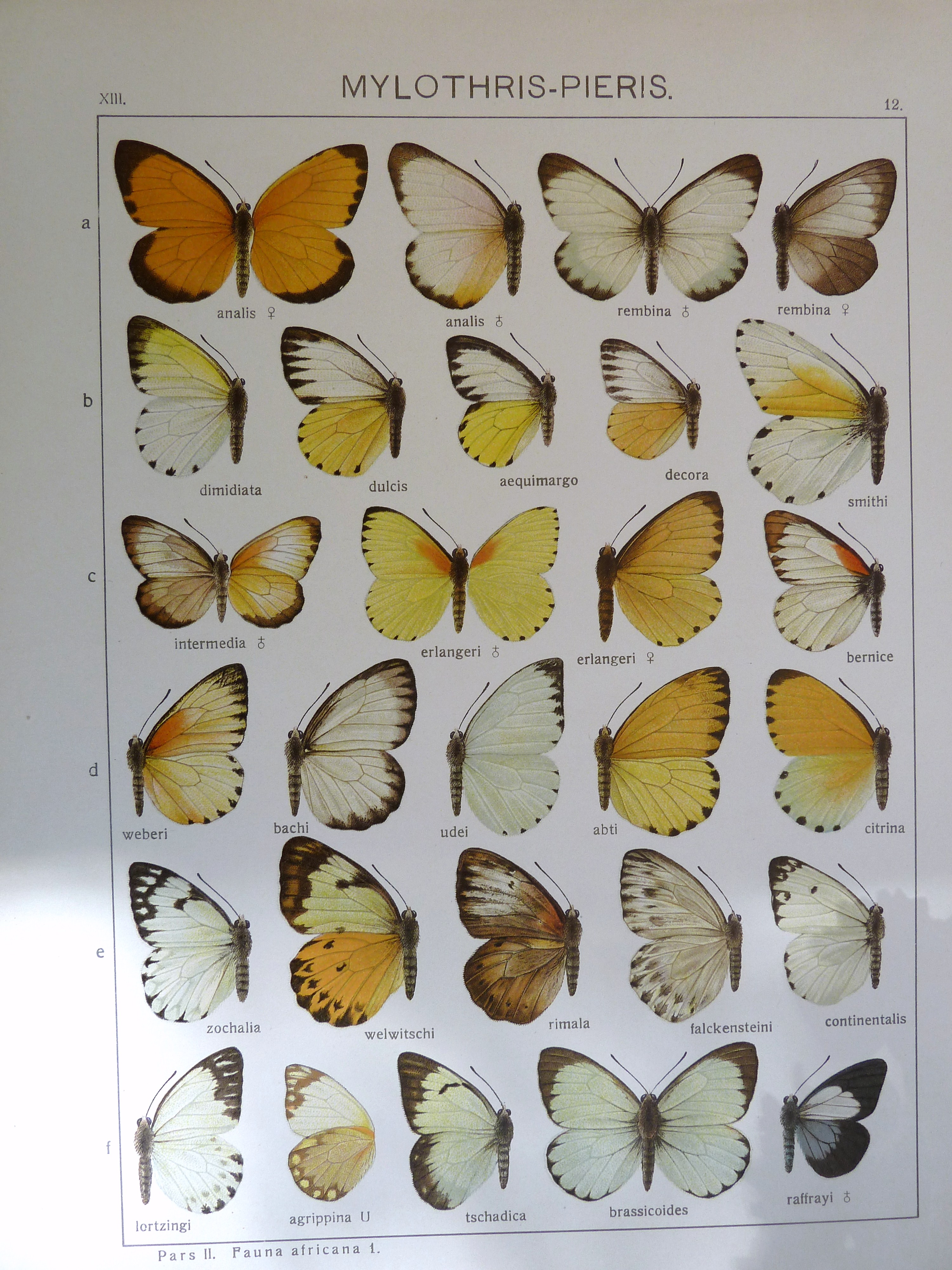
- in Seitz b

Scientific classification
- Kingdom: Animalia
- Phylum: Arthropoda
- Clade: Pancrustacea
- Class: Insecta
- Order: Lepidoptera
- Family: Pieridae
- Genus: Mylothris
- Species: M. smithii

Binomial name
- Mylothris smithii (Mabille, 1879)

Synonyms
- Pieris smithii Mabille, 1879

= Mylothris smithii =

Species of butterfly

Mylothris smithii is a butterfly in the family Pieridae. It is found on Madagascar. The habitat consists of forests.
