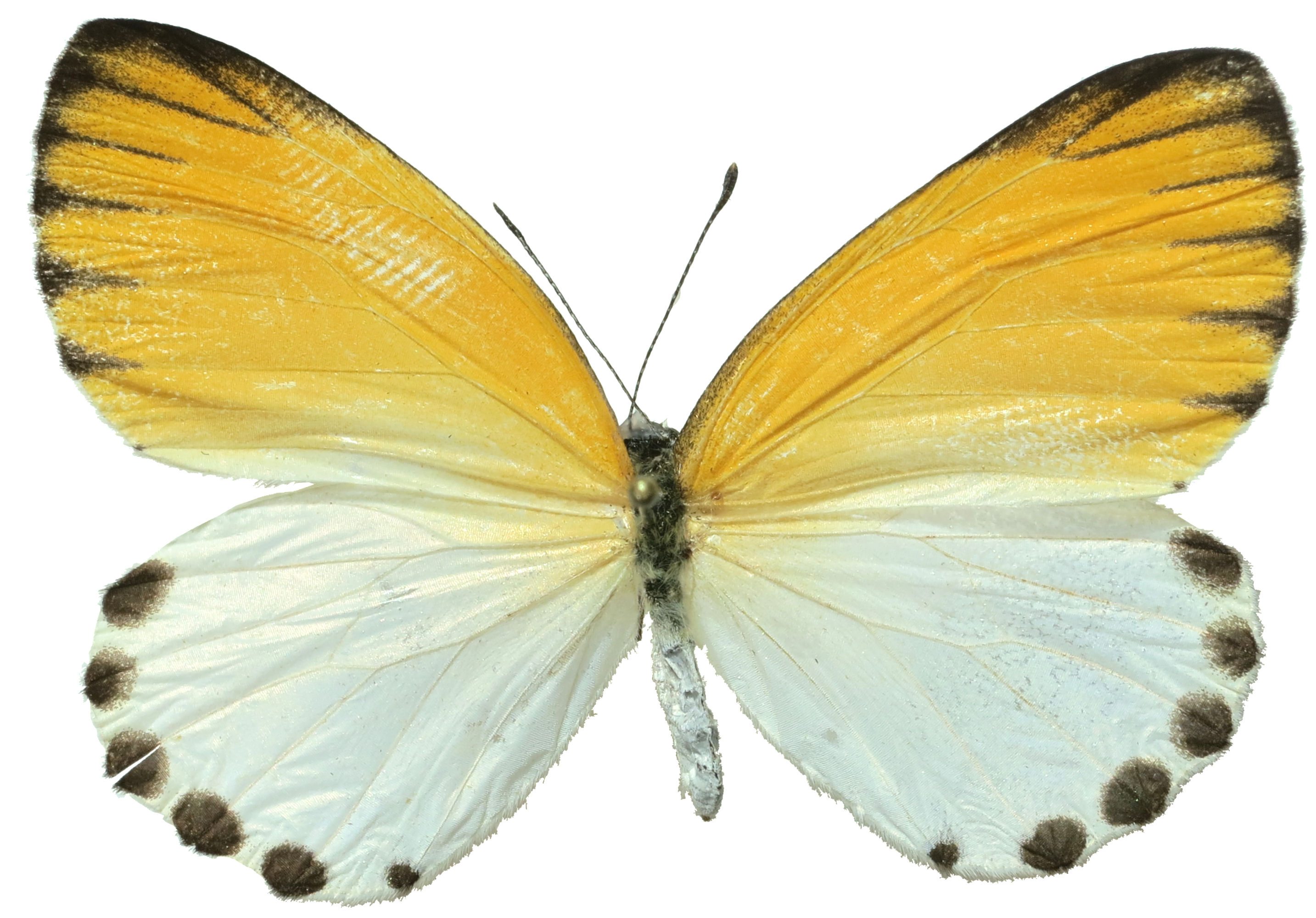
- Mylothris spica - Cameroon

Scientific classification
- Kingdom: Animalia
- Phylum: Arthropoda
- Clade: Pancrustacea
- Class: Insecta
- Order: Lepidoptera
- Family: Pieridae
- Genus: Mylothris
- Species: M. spica

Binomial name
- Mylothris spica (Möschler, 1884)

Synonyms
- Tachyris poppea var. spica Möschler, 1884

= Mylothris spica =

Species of butterfly

Mylothris spica, the spica dotted border is a butterfly in the family Pieridae. It is found in Ghana and Angola. The 'Larsen' numbers have since been used with permission in A Sharp Eye on Butterflies of Ghana.
