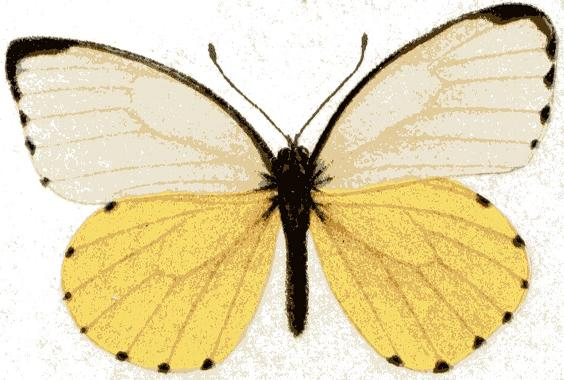

Conservation status
- Least Concern (IUCN 3.1)

Scientific classification
- Kingdom: Animalia
- Phylum: Arthropoda
- Clade: Pancrustacea
- Class: Insecta
- Order: Lepidoptera
- Family: Pieridae
- Genus: Mylothris
- Species: M. trimenia

Binomial name
- Mylothris trimenia (Butler, 1869)

Synonyms
- Pieris trimenia Butler, 1869

= Mylothris trimenia =

Species of butterfly

Mylothris trimenia, the Trimen's dotted border, is a butterfly of the family Pieridae. It is found in South Africa, on the wet side of the Winterberg escarpment from the East Cape to the coast. It is also found in KwaZulu-Natal and the Limpopo Province.

The wingspan is 45–50 millimetres (1.8–2.0 in). Adults are on wing year-round in warmer areas, with a peak from October to April. In cooler areas it is only on the wing from October to April.

The larvae feed on Tapinanthus - T. oleifolius and T. kraussianus.
