= Mylothris basalis =

Scientific classification
- Kingdom: Animalia
- Phylum: Arthropoda
- Clade: Pancrustacea
- Class: Insecta
- Order: Lepidoptera
- Family: Pieridae
- Genus: Mylothris
- Species: M. basalis

Binomial name
- Mylothris basalis Aurivillius, 1906

Species of butterfly

Mylothris basalis is a butterfly in the family Pieridae. It is found in Cameroon, Equatorial Guinea, Gabon, the central and north-eastern part of the Democratic Republic of the Congo and western Tanzania. The habitat consists of lowland forests.
