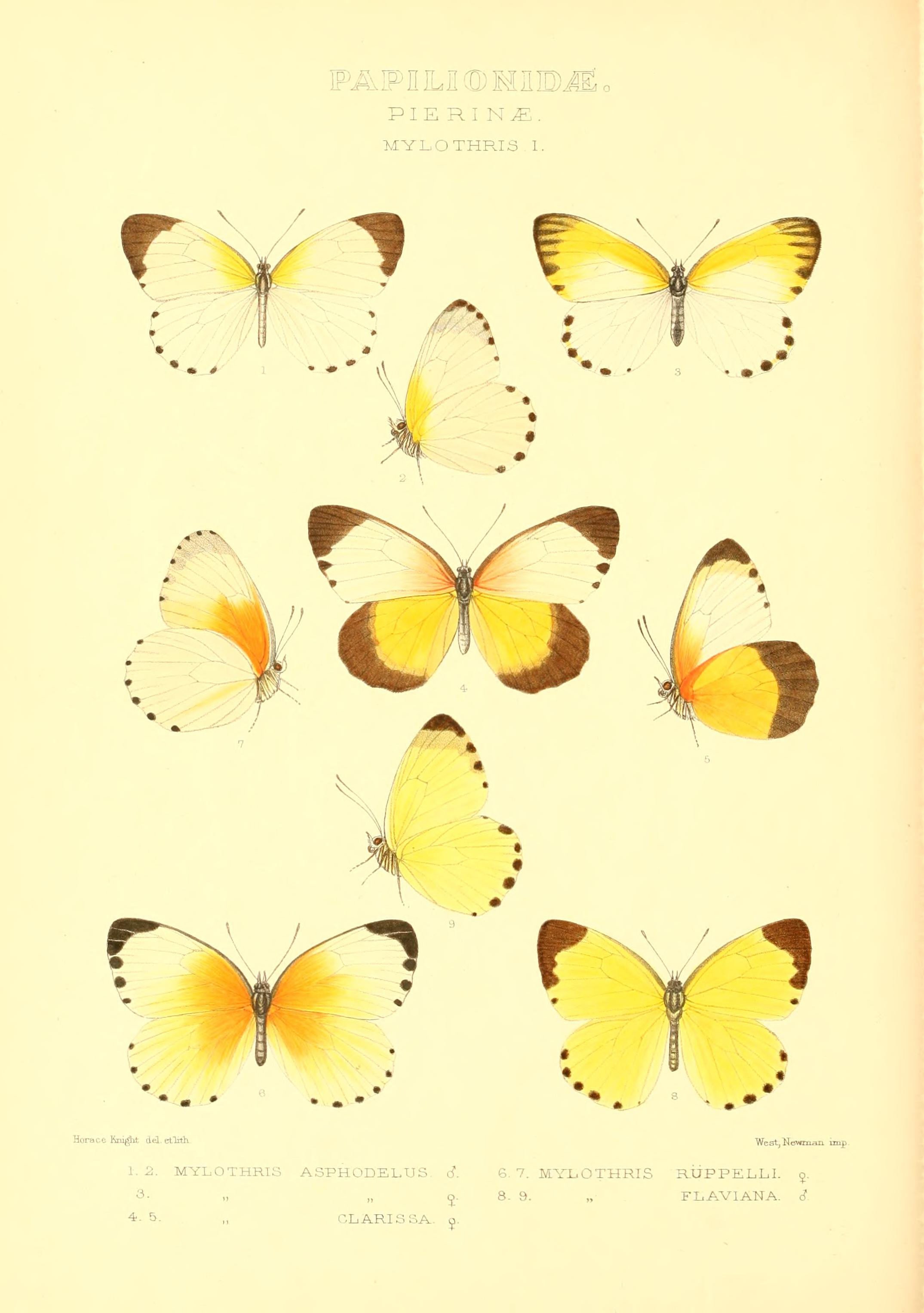
- Figures 8 and 9

Scientific classification
- Kingdom: Animalia
- Phylum: Arthropoda
- Clade: Pancrustacea
- Class: Insecta
- Order: Lepidoptera
- Family: Pieridae
- Genus: Mylothris
- Species: M. flaviana

Binomial name
- Mylothris flaviana Grose-Smith, 1898

Synonyms
- Mylothris solilucis Schultze, 1914; Mylothris flaviana var. aurantiaca Rebel, 1914; Mylothris interposita Joicey & Talbot, 1921

= Mylothris flaviana =

Species of butterfly

Mylothris flaviana, the yellow dotted border, is a butterfly in the family Pieridae. It is found in Nigeria, Cameroon, the Republic of the Congo, the Democratic Republic of the Congo and Tanzania. The habitat consists of submontane forests.

== Subspecies ==
- Mylothris flaviana flaviana (eastern Nigeria, western Cameroon)
- Mylothris flaviana interposita Joicey & Talbot, 1921 (south-eastern Cameroon, Congo, Democratic Republic of the Congo, Tanzania)
