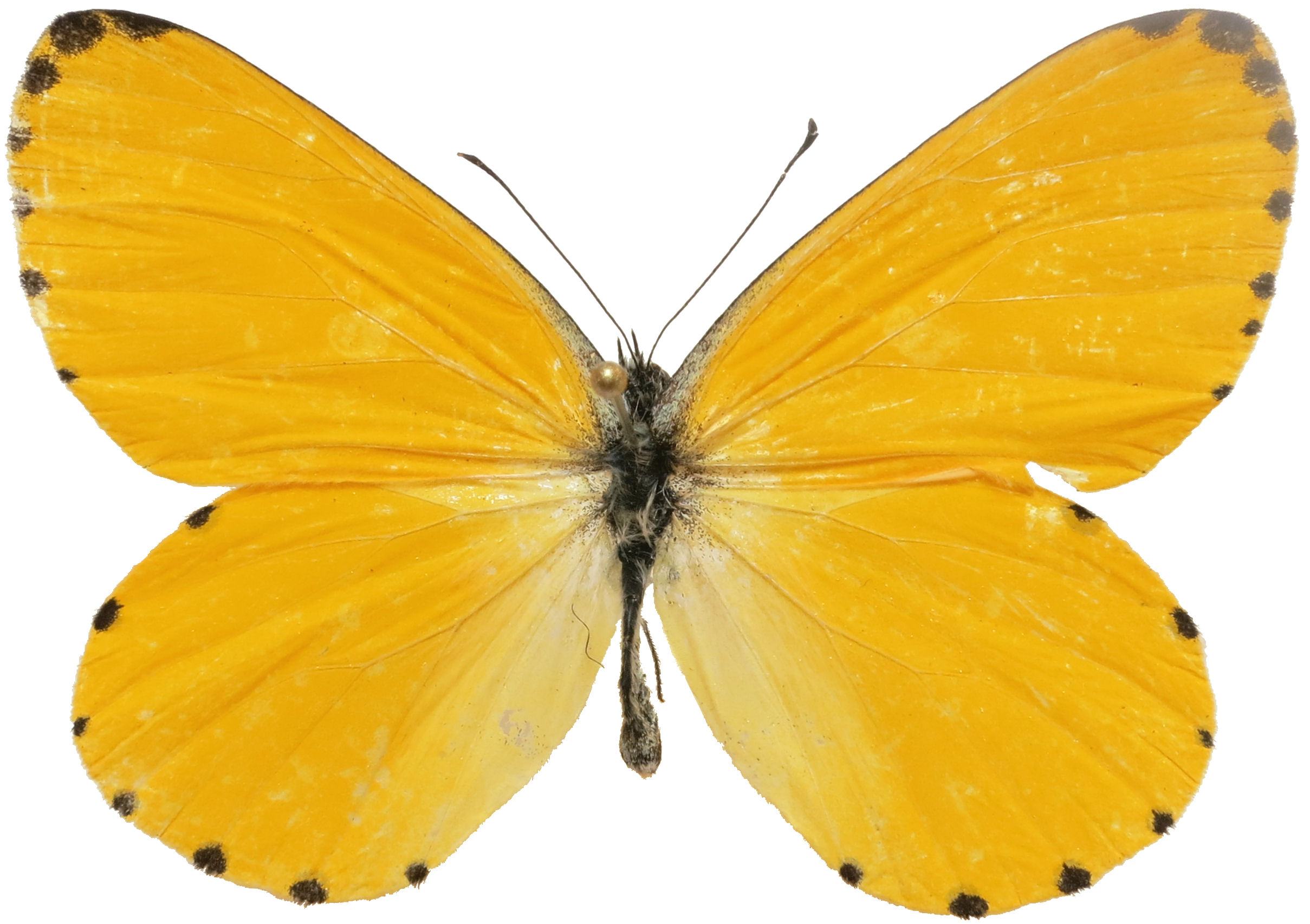
- Mylothris croceus - Ituri Province, DRC

Scientific classification
- Kingdom: Animalia
- Phylum: Arthropoda
- Clade: Pancrustacea
- Class: Insecta
- Order: Lepidoptera
- Family: Pieridae
- Genus: Mylothris
- Species: M. croceus

Binomial name
- Mylothris croceus Butler, 1896

Synonyms
- Mylothris crocea ab. uniformata Dufrane, 1947

= Mylothris croceus =

Species of butterfly

Mylothris croceus is a butterfly in the family Pieridae. It is found in Uganda, Rwanda and the Democratic Republic of the Congo. The habitat consists of forests.

== Subspecies ==
- Mylothris croceus croceus (Uganda, Rwanda, Democratic Republic of the Congo)
- Mylothris croceus ituriensis Berger, 1981 (Democratic Republic of the Congo: Ituri Forest)
