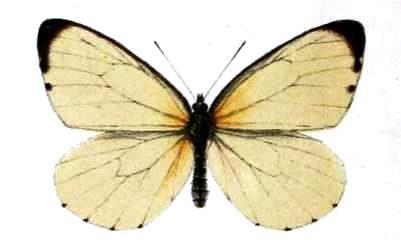

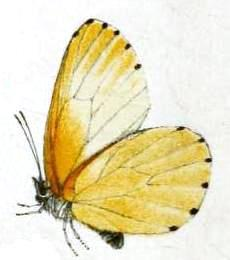

Scientific classification
- Kingdom: Animalia
- Phylum: Arthropoda
- Clade: Pancrustacea
- Class: Insecta
- Order: Lepidoptera
- Family: Pieridae
- Genus: Mylothris
- Species: M. yulei

Binomial name
- Mylothris yulei Butler, 1897

Synonyms
- Mylothris yulei ab. sulphurascens Hulstaert, 1924; Mylothris yulei sulphurascens Berger, 1954; Mylothris latimargo amhara Ungemach, 1932; Mylothris latimargo Joicey & Talbot, 1921

= Mylothris yulei =

Species of butterfly

Mylothris yulei, Yule's dotted border or the fragile dotted border, is a butterfly in the family Pieridae. It is found in Nigeria, Cameroon, Ethiopia, the Democratic Republic of the Congo, Uganda, Kenya, Tanzania, Zambia, Malawi, Mozambique and Zimbabwe. The habitat consists of submontane and montane forests and dense woodland.

They are on wing from February to September and in November.

The larvae feed on Hevea brasiliensis, Theobroma cacao and Santalales species.

== Subspecies ==
- M. y. yulei (Democratic Republic of the Congo, Kenya (east of the Rift Valley), Tanzania, Malawi, northern Zambia, Mozambique, eastern border of Zimbabwe)
- M. y. amhara Ungemach, 1932 (southern Ethiopia)
- M. y. bansoana Talbot, 1944 (eastern Nigeria, western Cameroon)
- M. y. latimargo Joicey & Talbot, 1921 (Uganda, Kenya (west of the Rift Valley), north-western Tanzania)
