= Mylothris polychroma =

Scientific classification
- Kingdom: Animalia
- Phylum: Arthropoda
- Clade: Pancrustacea
- Class: Insecta
- Order: Lepidoptera
- Family: Pieridae
- Genus: Mylothris
- Species: M. polychroma

Binomial name
- Mylothris polychroma Berger, 1981

Synonyms
- Mylothris polychroma f. semirufa Berger, 1981

Species of butterfly

Mylothris polychroma is a butterfly in the family Pieridae. It is found in the eastern part of the Democratic Republic of the Congo (southern Kivu and Tanganika), Rwanda and Burundi. The habitat consists of forests and forest margins.
