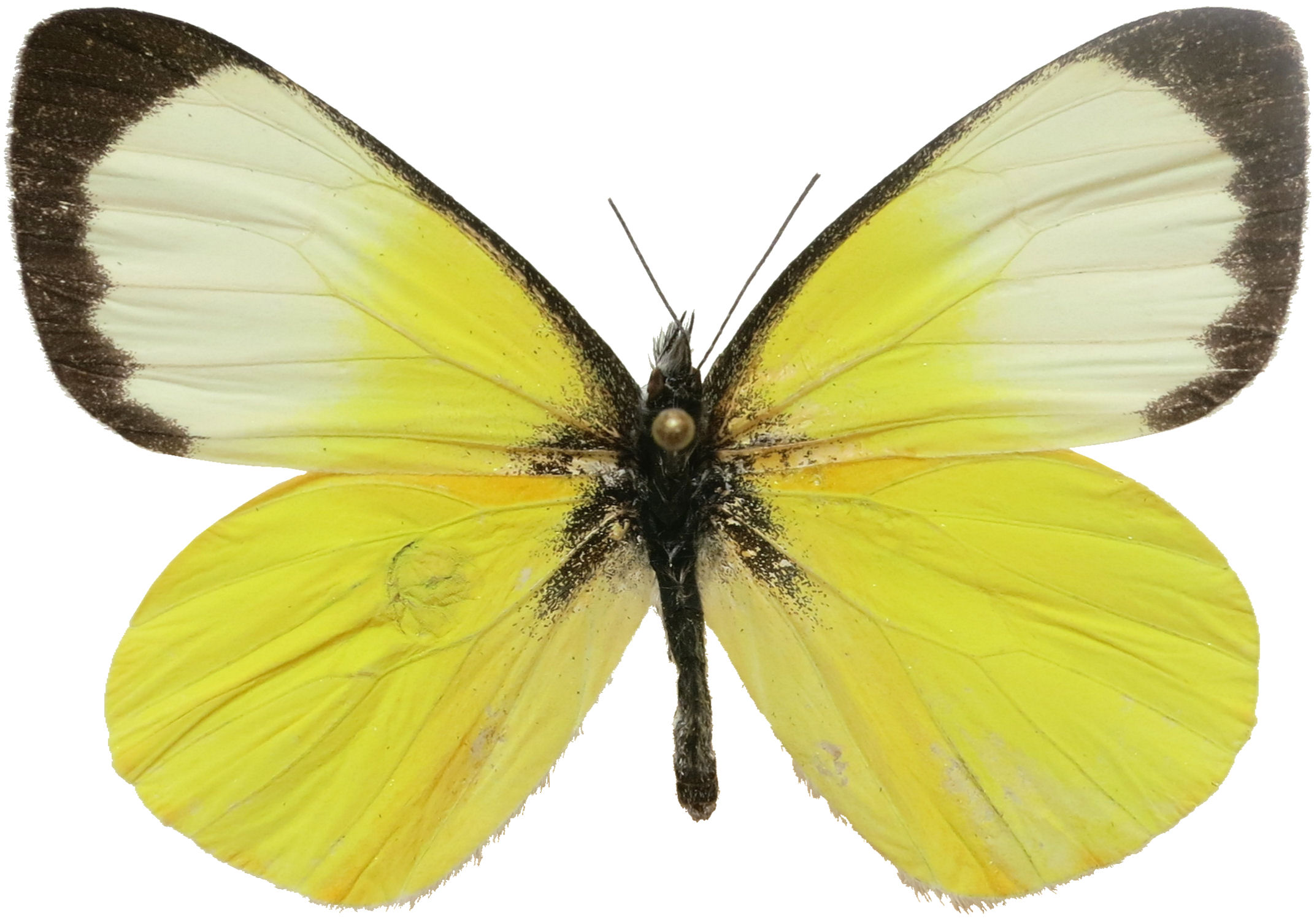
- Mylothris ruandana - North Kivu, DRC

Scientific classification
- Kingdom: Animalia
- Phylum: Arthropoda
- Clade: Pancrustacea
- Class: Insecta
- Order: Lepidoptera
- Family: Pieridae
- Genus: Mylothris
- Species: M. ruandana

Binomial name
- Mylothris ruandana Strand, 1909

= Mylothris ruandana =

Species of butterfly

Mylothris ruandana is a butterfly in the family Pieridae. It is found in the Democratic Republic of the Congo, Uganda, Rwanda and Burundi. The habitat consists of forests.

The larvae feed on Loranthus species.
