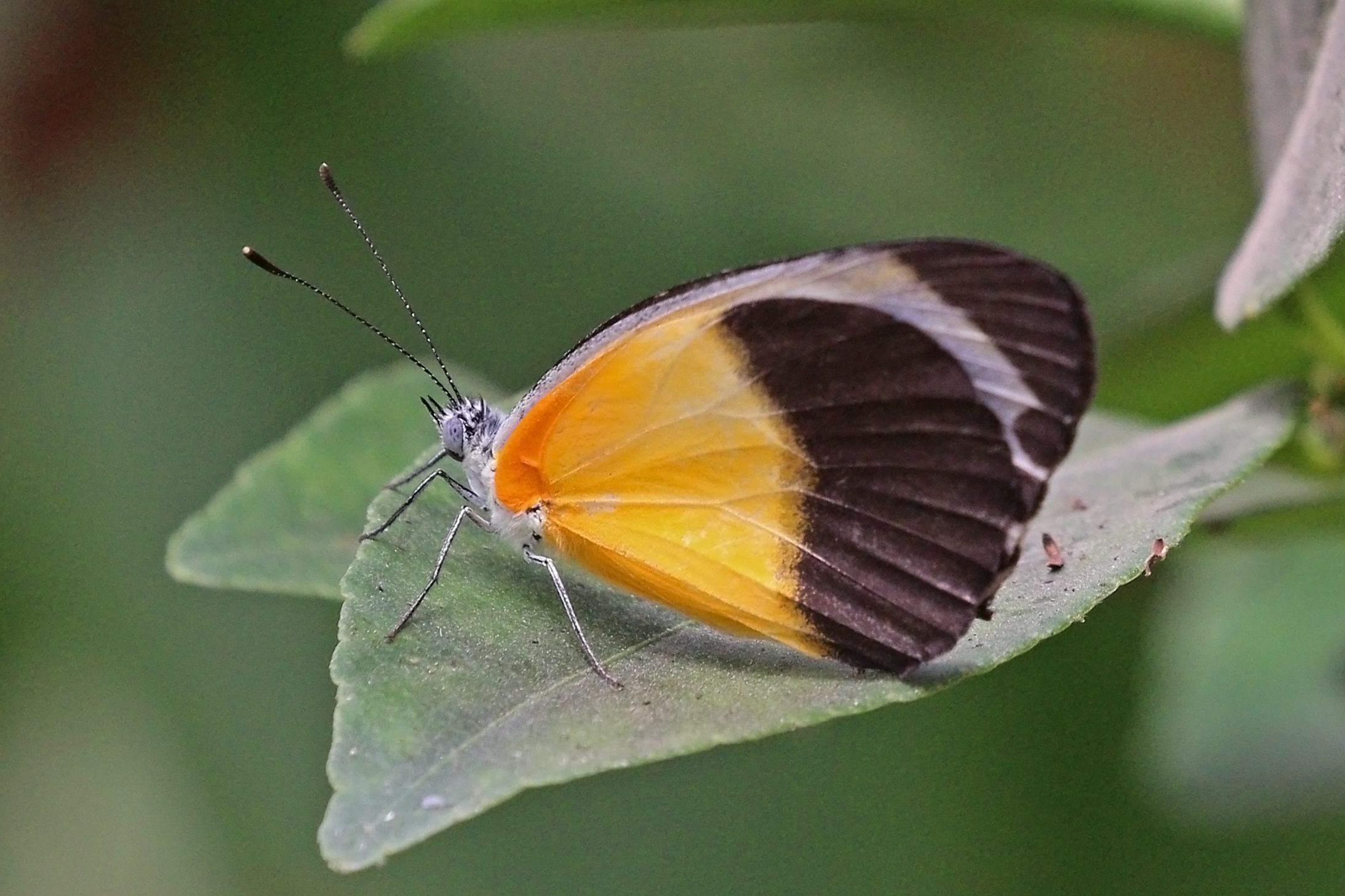
- male M. c. chloris Gambia

Scientific classification
- Kingdom: Animalia
- Phylum: Arthropoda
- Clade: Pancrustacea
- Class: Insecta
- Order: Lepidoptera
- Family: Pieridae
- Genus: Mylothris
- Species: M. chloris

Binomial name
- Mylothris chloris (Fabricius, 1775)

Synonyms
- Papilio chloris Fabricius, 1775; Papilio thermopylae Cramer, [1779]; Mylothris afraorientalis Stoneham, 1937; Mylothris analis Aurivillius, 1907; Mylothris chloris f. nox Talbot, 1944; Mylothris agathina ab. wansoni Dufrane, 1947; Mylothris clarissa Butler, 1888; Mylothris wintoniana Sharpe, 1891; Mylothris afraorientalis f. ochrascens Stoneham, 1937; Mylothris chloris f. rubrochracea Stoneham, 1937; Mylothris chloris f. ochreata Talbot, 1944; Mylothris chloris f. melanoflava Stoneham, 1957; Mylothris chloris f. dentigera Stoneham, 1957; Mylothris afraorientalis f. admeta Stoneham, 1957; Mylothris afraorientalis f. pyrina Stoneham, 1957; Mylothris afraorientalis f. agathinaria Stoneham, 1957

= Mylothris chloris =

Species of butterfly

Mylothris chloris, the western dotted border or common dotted border, is a butterfly in the family Pieridae. It is found in Senegal, the Gambia, Mali, Guinea-Bissau, Guinea, Sierra Leone, Liberia, Ivory Coast, Burkina Faso, Ghana, Togo, Benin, Nigeria, Cameroon, Equatorial Guinea, Gabon, the Republic of the Congo, the Central African Republic, the Democratic Republic of the Congo, Sudan, Uganda, Kenya and Tanzania. The habitat consists of open woodland and dense savanna, but may also be found in disturbed rainforest areas and suburban gardens.

The larvae feed on Osyris abyssinicus, Englerina gabonensis, Phragmanthera capitata, Loranthus and Viscum species.

== Subspecies ==
- Mylothris chloris chloris (Senegal, the Gambia, Mali, Guinea-Bissau, Guinea, Sierra Leone, Liberia, Ivory Coast, Burkina Faso, Ghana, Togo, Benin, Nigeria, Cameroon, Equatorial Guinea, Gabon, Republic of the Congo, Central African Republic, Democratic Republic of the Congo, southern Sudan, north-western Tanzania)
- Mylothris chloris clarissa Butler, 1888 (eastern Uganda, western Kenya)

Torben Larsen developed a species numbering system for his 2005 publication Butterflies of West Africa. The nominate subspecies is #95. The 'Larsen' numbers have since been used with permission in A Sharp Eye on Butterflies of Ghana.
