= Mylothris alberici =

Scientific classification
- Kingdom: Animalia
- Phylum: Arthropoda
- Clade: Pancrustacea
- Class: Insecta
- Order: Lepidoptera
- Family: Pieridae
- Genus: Mylothris
- Species: M. alberici

Binomial name
- Mylothris alberici Dufrane, 1940

Synonyms
- Mylothris croceus f. marginea Joicey and Talbot, 1925; Mylothris marginea Jackson, 1956

Species of butterfly

Mylothris alberici is a butterfly in the family Pieridae. It is found in western Uganda, Rwanda, and the Democratic Republic of the Congo (Kivu). The habitat consists of forests.
