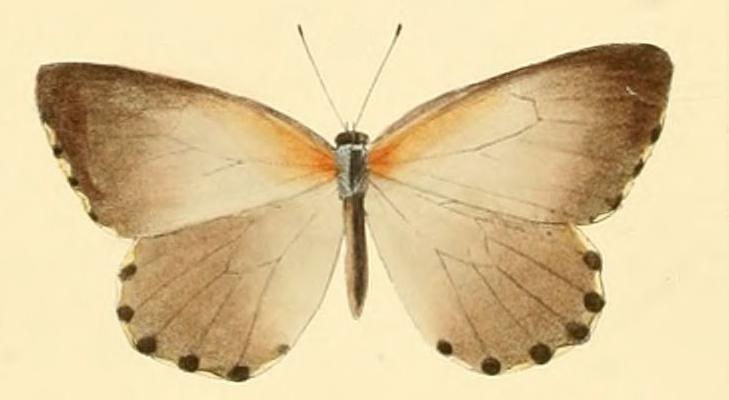

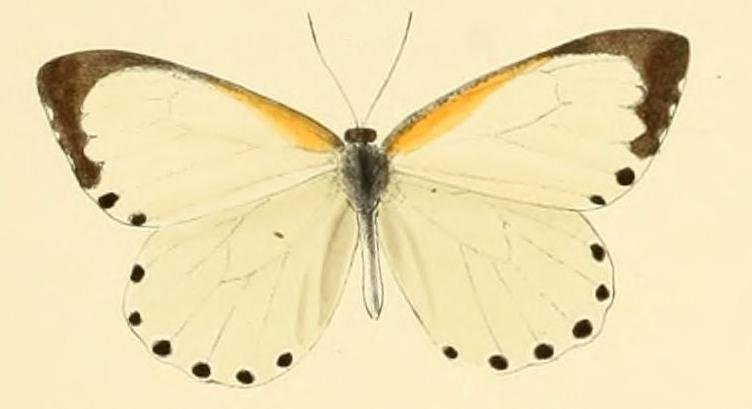

Scientific classification
- Kingdom: Animalia
- Phylum: Arthropoda
- Clade: Pancrustacea
- Class: Insecta
- Order: Lepidoptera
- Family: Pieridae
- Genus: Mylothris
- Species: M. bernice

Binomial name
- Mylothris bernice (Hewitson, 1866)

Synonyms
- Pieris bernice Hewitson, 1866; Pieris bernice f. pallescens Gaede, 1916

= Mylothris bernice =

Species of butterfly

Mylothris bernice is a butterfly in the family Pieridae. It is found from Cameroon and Gabon to the Democratic Republic of the Congo, Rwanda, Burundi, Uganda and Zambia. The habitat consists of marshes and swamps.

The larvae feed on Persicaria attenuata pulchra. They reach a length of about 25 mm (0.98 in). Pupation takes place in a pale pinkish brown pupa.

== Subspecies ==
- M. b. bernice (Cameroon, Gabon)
- M. b. albescens Berger, 1981 (Democratic Republic of the Congo)
- M. b. berenicides Holland, 1896 (Democratic Republic of the Congo, Rwanda, Burundi, Uganda)
- M. b. nigrovenosa Berger, 1981 (Democratic Republic of the Congo)
- M. b. overlaeti Berger, 1981 (Democratic Republic of the Congo, Zambia)
