= Acraea hamata =

Scientific classification
- Kingdom: Animalia
- Phylum: Arthropoda
- Class: Insecta
- Order: Lepidoptera
- Family: Nymphalidae
- Genus: Acraea
- Species: A. hamata

Binomial name
- Acraea hamata Joicey & Talbot, 1922

Synonyms
- Acraea (Acraea) hamata

Species of butterfly

Acraea hamata is a butterfly in the family Nymphalidae. It is found in the Democratic Republic of the Congo (from the eastern part of the country to Kivu), Uganda (from the south-western art of the country to Kigezi), Rwanda and Tanzania.

== Taxonomy ==
It is a member of the Acraea terpsicore species group - but see also Pierre & Bernaud, 2014
