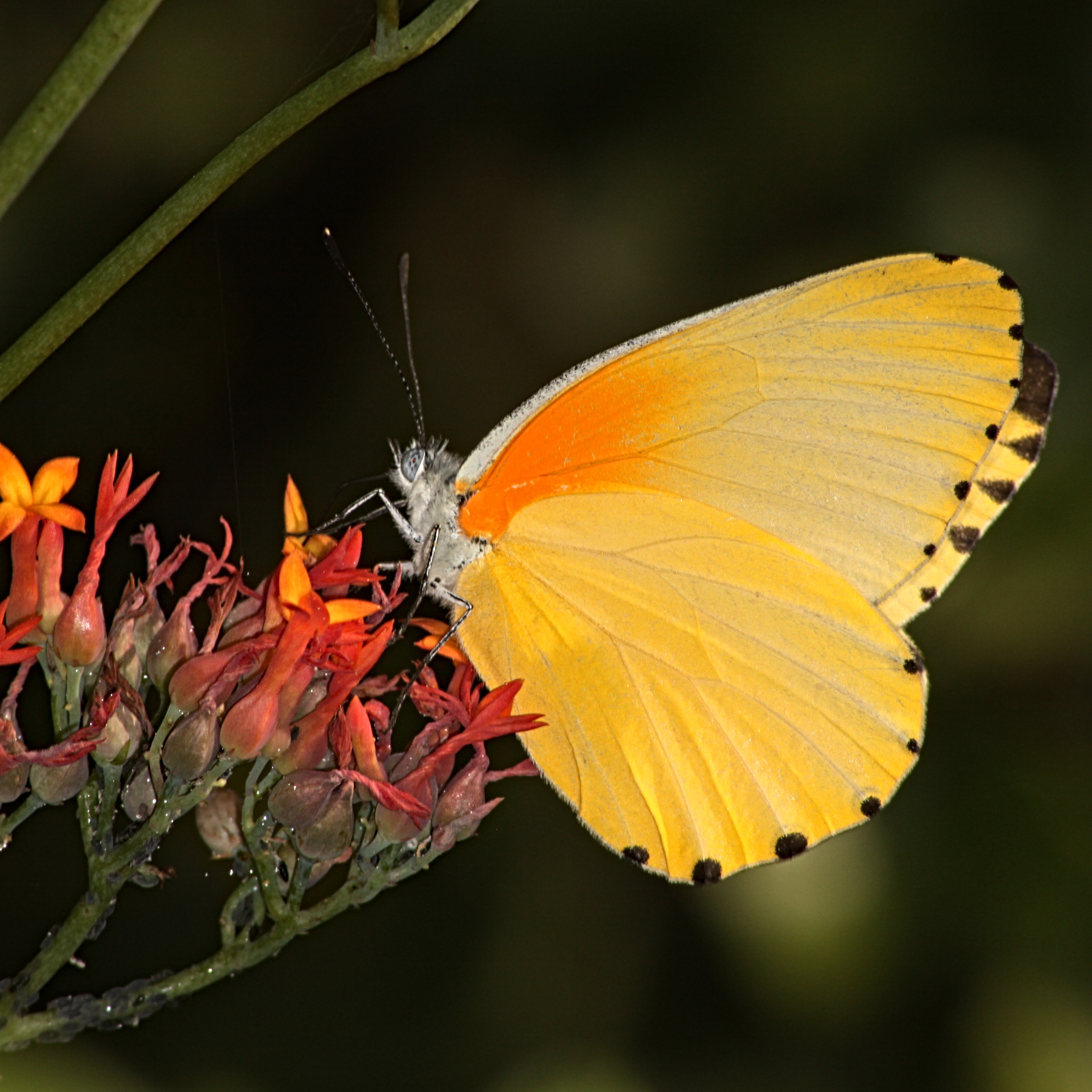
- Female

Scientific classification
- Kingdom: Animalia
- Phylum: Arthropoda
- Clade: Pancrustacea
- Class: Insecta
- Order: Lepidoptera
- Family: Pieridae
- Genus: Mylothris
- Species: M. agathina

Binomial name
- Mylothris agathina (Cramer, [1779])

Synonyms
- Papilio agathina Cramer, [1779]; Mylothris richlora Suffert, 1904; Cathaemia xantholeuca Hübner, 1819 in Hübner, [1816-[1826]; Mylothris chloris f. leucoma Talbot, 1944; Mylothris agathina ab. carminea Dufrane, 1947; Mylothris agathina ab. radiata Dufrane, 1947; Mylothris agathina ab. dawanti Dufrane, 1947; Mylothris agathina f. maureli Dufrane, 1947; Mylothris chloris ab. macrosticta Storace, 1953; Mylothris intermedia Aurivillius, 1910; Mylothris chloris f. agathinoides Talbot, 1944; Mylothris agathina f. bicolor Berger, 1981; Mylothris agathina f. unicolor Berger, 1981

= Mylothris agathina =

Species of butterfly

Mylothris agathina, the eastern dotted border or common dotted border, is a butterfly of the family Pieridae. It is native to sub-Saharan Africa, particularly East Africa and southern Africa. In South Africa its range has spread westwards around the coast in the late 20th century, and it now occurs north of Cape Town to somewhat beyond Saldanha.

== Description ==
The common dotted border have bright white wings with shades of yellow, with black dots along the wing margins. The wingspan is 50–60 millimetres (2.0–2.4 in) for males and 52–65 mm (2.0–2.6 in) for females. The slow-flying adults are on wing year-round, with peaks in October and from late February to April.

== Habitat ==
Mylothris agathina is commonly found in sub-Saharan Africa, particularly in savannas, forests, grasslands, open woodlands and bushveld areas. They are often spotted in suburban gardens, especially at the top of trees. They prefer areas with abundant flowering plants and males often mudpuddle. They rely on nectar as a food source such as the Natal Blue Haze (Tetraselago natalensis), which is a great nectar plant found in the threatened grasslands of KwaZulu-Natal (KZN).

These grasslands are often located near forests, where the butterflies are commonly sighted. Additionally, Mylothris agathina larvae are known to utilize hemiparasitic plants such as Hairy Mistletoe (Erianthemum dregei) and African Sandalwood (Osyris lanceolata) as host plants.

== Distribution ==
Sudan, Ethiopia, Somalia, Kenya (east of the Rift Valley), Tanzania, Democratic Republic of Congo (south), Angola, Malawi, Zambia, Mozambique, Zimbabwe, Botswana, Namibia, South Africa (Limpopo Province, Mpumalanga, North West Province, Gauteng, KwaZulu-Natal, Eastern Cape Province, Western Cape Province), Swaziland.

== Lifecycle ==
Lifecycle: The lifecycle of Mylothris agathina follows the typical stages of a butterfly: egg, larva (caterpillar), pupa (chrysalis), and adult. The eggs are typically laid on host plants such as Hairy Mistletoe and African Sandalwood, where the caterpillars hatch and feed. The pupae resemble bird droppings. After undergoing metamorphosis, the adult butterflies emerge and begin searching for mates and food.

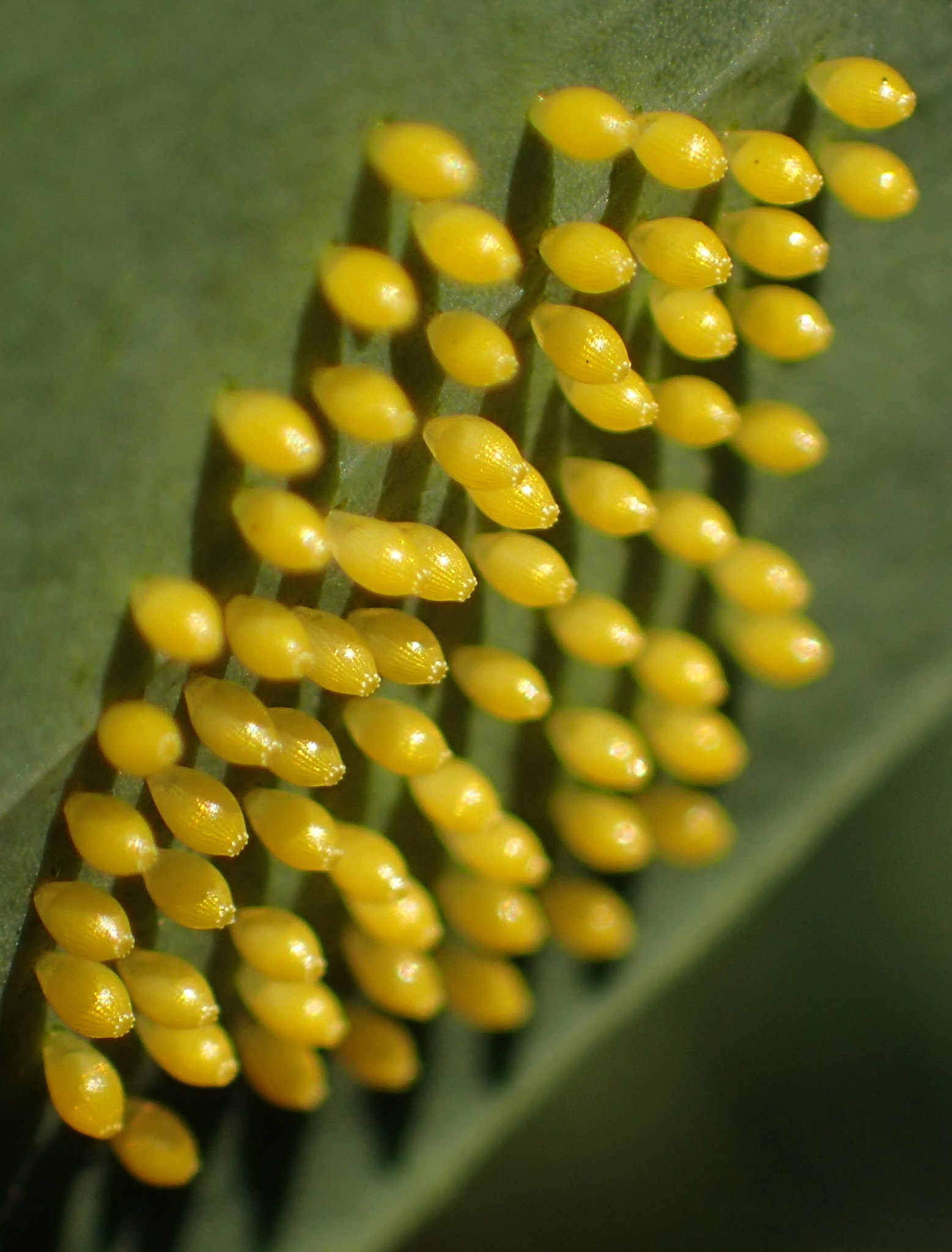
Batch of eggs oviposited on a leaf

The first instar larvae hatched from the eggs on the host plant.

== Diet ==
As caterpillars, Mylothris agathina larvae feed primarily on leaves of host plants within the family Fabaceae (legumes) such as Erianthemum dregei commonly known as Hairy Mistletoe and Osyris compressa (formerly Colpoon compressum) known as African Sandalwood. The gregarious larvae feed on various host plants like Tapinanthus oleifolius, Tapinanthus rubromarginatus, Teighemia quinquenervia, Ximenia afra, Osyris lanceolata. As adults, they primarily feed on the nectar of flowering plants, including Tetraselago natalensis, known as Natal Blue Haze and other flowering plants found in their habitat

== Predation and defense mechanism ==
Mylothris agathina faces predation from birds, reptiles, and insects.

== Conservation ==
The conservation status of Mylothris agathina is currently not assessed on the IUCN Red List. However, like many butterfly species, they may be susceptible to habitat loss, climate change, and other environmental threats. Conservation efforts may include habitat preservation, restoration projects, and raising awareness about the importance of butterfly conservation.

== Subspecies ==
- Mylothris agathina agathina – Sudan, Ethiopia, Somalia, Kenya (east of the Rift Valley), Tanzania, DRC (south), Angola, Zambia, Malawi, Namibia, Zimbabwe, Botswana, Mozambique, Eswatini and South Africa (Limpopo, Mpumalanga, North West, Gauteng, KwaZulu-Natal, Eastern and Western Cape provinces)
- Mylothris agathina richlora Suffert, 1904 – Cameroon, Central African Republic, DRC (Ituri province) and Uganda
