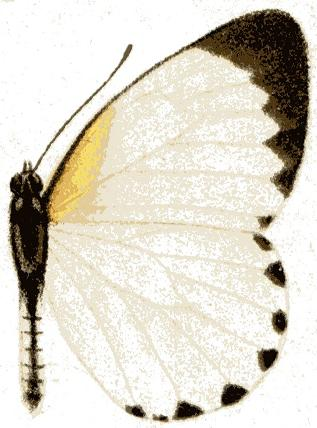
- Male
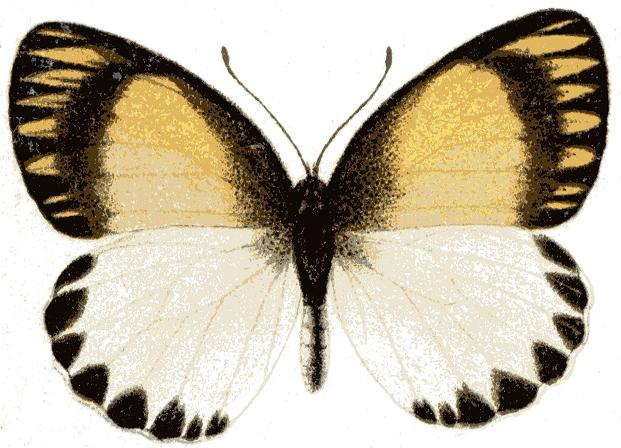
- Female

Scientific classification
- Kingdom: Animalia
- Phylum: Arthropoda
- Clade: Pancrustacea
- Class: Insecta
- Order: Lepidoptera
- Family: Pieridae
- Genus: Mylothris
- Species: M. rhodope

Binomial name
- Mylothris rhodope (Fabricius, 1775)

Synonyms
- Papilio rhodope Fabricius, 1775; Pieris eudoxia Boisduval, 1836; Mylothris spica caspi Suffert, 1904; Mylothris hilara f. pseudohilara Strand, 1912; Mylothris spica ab. hintzi Strand, 1912; Mylothris spica f. spicana Strand, 1913; Mylothris spica f. spicatana Strand, 1913; Mylothris spica f. spicatella Strand, 1913; Mylothris spica f. donovani Holland, 1920; Mylothris rhodope f. lutea Berger, 1981

= Mylothris rhodope =

Species of butterfly

Mylothris rhodope, the common dotted border, Rhodope or tropical dotted border, is a butterfly in the family Pieridae. It is found in Sierra Leone, Liberia, Ivory Coast, Ghana, Togo, Nigeria, Cameroon, Equatorial Guinea, Bioko, the Republic of the Congo, the Central African Republic, Angola, the Democratic Republic of the Congo, Burundi, Rwanda, western Uganda, north-western Tanzania and north-western Zambia. The habitat consists of lowland forests.

Adult males have been recorded mud-puddling on the banks of forest streams. Females fly low and stay amongst shady places in the forest.

The larvae feed on Santalales species.

Torben Larsen developed a species numbering system for his 2005 publication Butterflies of West Africa. This species is #109. The 'Larsen' numbers have since been used with permission in A Sharp Eye on Butterflies of Ghana.
