= H. aequatorialis =

H. aequatorialis may refer to:

- Harpendyreus aequatorialis, butterfly in the family Lycaenidae
- Hypophytala aequatorialis, synonym of Hypophytala hyettoides
