= Harpendyreus notoba =

Scientific classification
- Domain: Eukaryota
- Kingdom: Animalia
- Phylum: Arthropoda
- Class: Insecta
- Order: Lepidoptera
- Family: Lycaenidae
- Genus: Harpendyreus
- Species: H. notoba

Binomial name
- Harpendyreus notoba (Trimen, 1868)

Synonyms
- Lycaena notoba Trimen, 1868

Species of butterfly

Harpendyreus notoba, the salvia blue, is a butterfly of the family Lycaenidae. It is found in South Africa, from the northern East Cape, through the southern part of the Orange Free State to southern Gauteng the southern North West Province. It is also present in the North Cape.

The wingspan is 26–27 mm for males and 27–29 mm for females. Adults are on wing from August to May, with a peak from September to October.

The larvae feed on flowers and immature seeds of Salvia species, including Salvia radula.
