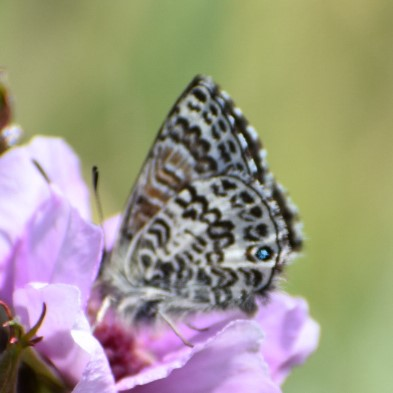

Scientific classification
- Kingdom: Animalia
- Phylum: Arthropoda
- Class: Insecta
- Order: Lepidoptera
- Family: Lycaenidae
- Genus: Harpendyreus
- Species: H. reginaldi

Binomial name
- Harpendyreus reginaldi Heron, 1909

= Harpendyreus reginaldi =

Species of butterfly

Harpendyreus reginaldi is a species of butterfly in the family Lycaenidae. It is found in Uganda (from the western part of the country to Ruwenzori, Toro and Kigezi), Rwanda and the Democratic Republic of the Congo (from the eastern part of the country to Kivu).
