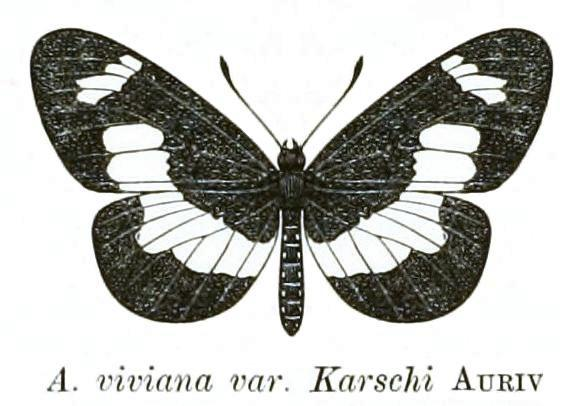
- Illustration in Aurivillius's Rhopalocera Aethiopica

Scientific classification
- Kingdom: Animalia
- Phylum: Arthropoda
- Clade: Pancrustacea
- Class: Insecta
- Order: Lepidoptera
- Family: Nymphalidae
- Genus: Acraea
- Species: A. karschi

Binomial name
- Acraea karschi Aurivillius, 1899

Synonyms
- Acraea viviana var. karschi Aurivillius, 1899; Acraea (Actinote) karschi

= Acraea karschi =

Species of butterfly

Acraea karschi, Karsch's acraea, is a butterfly in the family Nymphalidae. It is found in Nigeria, Cameroon and possibly Angola.

== Description ==
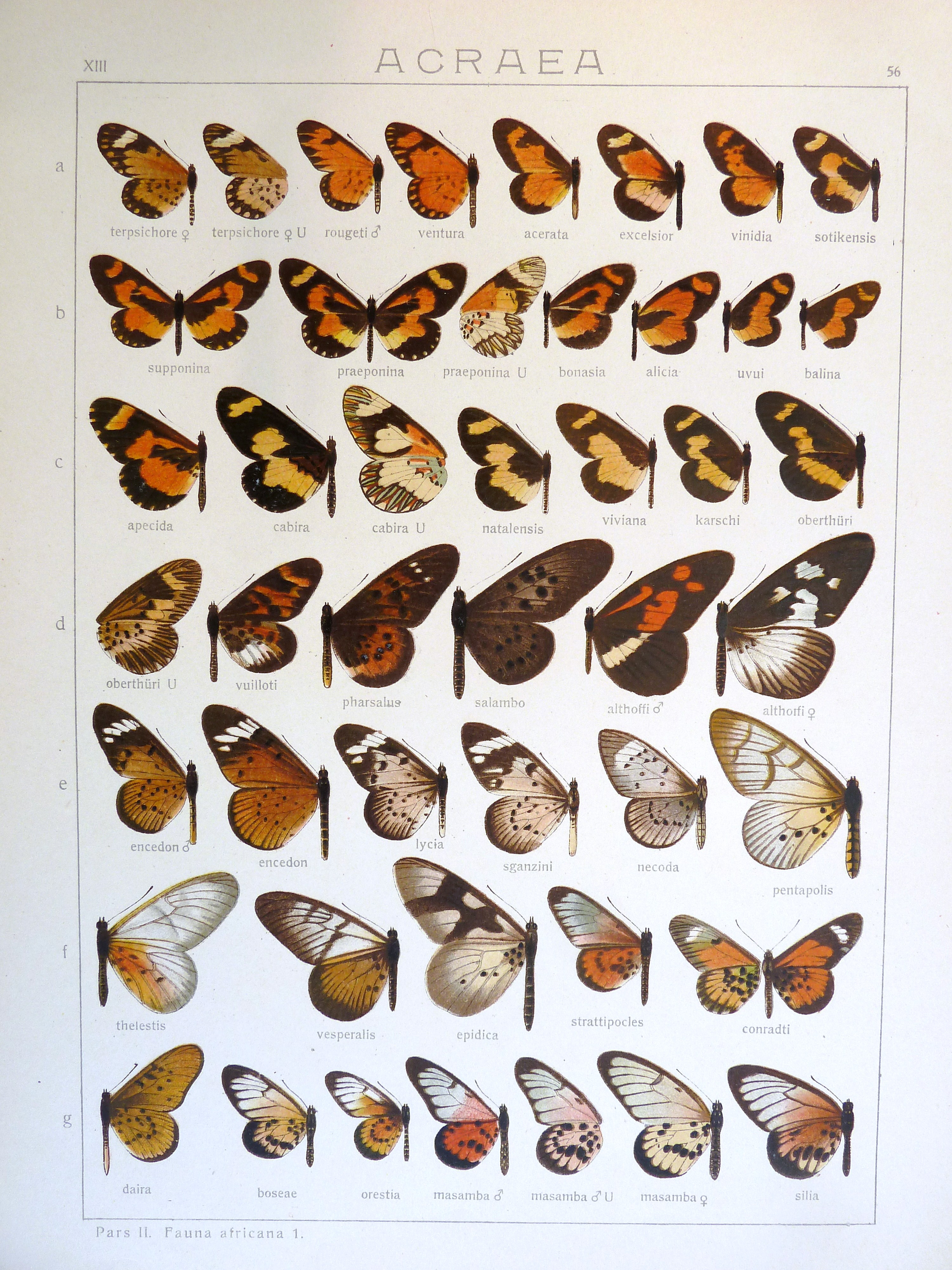
Seitz Fauna Africana plate 56

A. karschi Auriv. (56 c) is intermediate between Acraea viviana and Acraea cabira and differs from both in having the hindmarginal spot on the upperside of the forewing narrower, of more uniform breadth and not covering the base of cellule 2. The under surface of the hindwing exactly agrees with that of cabira. Is perhaps, as Eltringham thinks, only a form of cabira. Cameroons and British East Africa.

== Biology ==
The habitat consists of sub-montane forests.

Adult males mud-puddle.

== Taxonomy ==
Acraea karschi is a member of the Acraea bonasia species group; see Acraea.

See also Pierre & Bernaud, 2014

== Etymology ==
The name honours Ferdinand Karsch.
