= H. argenteostriata =

H. argenteostriata may refer to:

- Hemigrotella argenteostriata, the only species in the genus Hemigrotella
- Harpendyreus argenteostriata, butterfly in the family Lycaenidae
