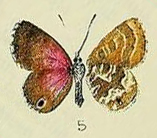
- Type illustration of H. juno

Scientific classification
- Kingdom: Animalia
- Phylum: Arthropoda
- Clade: Pancrustacea
- Class: Insecta
- Order: Lepidoptera
- Family: Lycaenidae
- Subfamily: Polyommatinae
- Tribe: Polyommatini
- Genus: Harpendyreus; Heron, 1909

= Harpendyreus =

Butterfly genus in family Lycaenidae

Harpendyreus is a genus of butterflies in the family Lycaenidae.

Small butterflies (wingspan 17–24 millimetres) with rounded wings without a tail at the back. The upper parts of the males are bright blue to reddish-violet, often with a small, black spot at the hind corner of the hindwing. The underparts are reddish-brown with slightly darker transverse bands, but without black spots.

The species are found along rivers and streams in high-altitude forests. The larvae feed on various low herbs, including lady's mantle, mints and sage.

The genus is distributed in sub-Saharan Africa, mostly in the eastern and southern parts.

== Species ==
- Harpendyreus aequatorialis (Sharpe, 1892)
- Harpendyreus argenteostriata Stempffer, 1961
- Harpendyreus berger Stempffer, 1976
- Harpendyreus boma (Bethune-Baker, 1926)
- Harpendyreus hazelae Stempffer, 1973
- Harpendyreus juno (Butler, 1897)
- Harpendyreus kisaba (Joicey & Talbot, 1921)
- Harpendyreus major (Joicey & Talbot, 1924)
- Harpendyreus marlieri Stempffer, 1961
- Harpendyreus marungensis (Joicey & Talbot, 1924)
- Harpendyreus meruana (Aurivillius, 1910)
- Harpendyreus noquasa (Trimen & Bowker, 1887)
- Harpendyreus notoba (Trimen, 1868)
- Harpendyreus reginaldi Heron, 1909
- Harpendyreus tsomo (Trimen, 1868)
