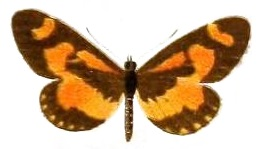
- A. sotikensis in Seitz (1925)

Scientific classification
- Kingdom: Animalia
- Phylum: Arthropoda
- Class: Insecta
- Order: Lepidoptera
- Family: Nymphalidae
- Genus: Acraea
- Species: A. sotikensis

Binomial name
- Acraea sotikensis Sharpe, 1892

Synonyms
- Acraea (Actinote) sotikensis; Acraea supponina Staudinger, 1896; Acraea supponina ninapo Suffert, 1904; Acraea sotikensis f. katana Eltringham, 1912; Acraea sotikensis rowena Eltringham, 1912; Acraea rupicola Schultze, 1912; Acraea sotikensis var. hansmeyeri Strand, 1913; Acraea sotikensis var. rowenina Gaede, 1915; Acraea karscheni var. cruentata Gaede, 1916; Acraea sotikensis f. bayeri Schouteden, 1919; Acraea karschi ab. vulcanica Schultze, 1923; Acraea sotikensis katerensis Stoneham, 1943; Acraea sotikensis f. exclamationis Stoneham, 1943; Acraea sotikensis f. albisubapex Stoneham, 1943; Acraea sotikensis f. rowena ab. mariae Dufrane, 1945; Acraea sotikensis f. rowena ab. alberici Dufrane, 1945

= Acraea sotikensis =

Sotik acraea

Species of butterfly

Acraea sotikensis, the Sotik acraea, is a butterfly in the family Nymphalidae which is native to the African tropics and subtropics.

== Range ==
It is found in Ethiopia, Uganda, Kenya, Tanzania, the Democratic Republic of the Congo, Malawi and Zambia.

== Description ==
A. sotikensis E. Sharpe (56 a). The red stripe on the median of the forewing above is usually entirely separated from the hindmarginal spot, occasionally joined to it, but always marked off by a distinct constriction. In the type-form the subapical band of the fore wing is light yellow, but the other light markings of the upper surface are yellow-red; the hindwing beneath has distinct red streaks in the basal part and a variegated marginal band, ornamented with light lines at the veins and reddish streaks at the proximal end of the marginal spots. Congo, Angola and Rhodesia to Uganda, Abyssinia and British East Africa.

- rowena Eltr. (56 b. as praeponina) only differs in having the median band of the hindwing above light yellow in cellules 1a to 3 and the under surface of the hindwing lighter. Ruwenzori.
- In katana Eltr. all the markings of the upper surface, even the subapical band of the forewing, are red. Southern Congo.
- supponina Stgr. (56 b ?) closely approximates to katana above, but occasionally has the subapical band of the forewing light yellow (= ab. ninapo Suff.), and differs beneath from all the sotikensis forms in having discal dots 4 to 7 on the underside of the hindwing strongly developed and placed in a straight line vertically to the costal margin; the red streaks in the basal part are strongly developed and form almost a continuous transverse band. Congo.
- praeponina Stgr [now Acraea bonasia] like katana, has the markings of the upper surface red, but differs in the unicolorous black marginal band of the hindwing beneath, which is not striped but only ornamented with marginal spots. Kudu and Congo.

A. rupicola A. Schultze [junior synonym] is a species quite recently described and apparently very variable, and is said to differ from the allied species in having the light markings of the upper surface much reduced and not very sharply defined. "On the forewing the subapical band, which in all the 7 specimens before me is pale yellow, in one female indistinctly dusted with brown-red, runs as in karschi, but is narrower; the hindmarginal spot (in 1a to 2) is narrowest in 1a, distally strongly incised at the veins; in 2 males and 2 females it is dull ochre-yellow, in one female densely dusted with yellow-red, in another with black, in 3 examples yellow-red; the longitudinal streak at the hindmargin of the cell is indistinct in the specimens with predominantly yellow markings, distinct in those with the red ones and in one female even encroaches into 1a, so that this specimen somewhat approaches Acraea bonasia. On the hindwing the very narrow median band recedes far from the distal margin in cellule 3, where only a very small light spot still persists, but projects distad in 4 and 5 in the shape of a double tooth; the median band is in 2 pairs dull ochre-yellow, in 1 male and 1 female in cellule 2 distally, in 4 to 6 for its entire breadth dusted with yellow-red, in the other specimens yellow-red. Light marginal spots are only indicated in one female by sparse yellow scaling. On the under surface rupicola likewise nearly approaches karschi. Expanse 37 to 42 (male) to 44 to 46 (female) mm. Primeval forests of the South Cameroons, where the species seems chiefly to frequent the cool granite rocks which occur here and there; was taken flying round a yellow-flowered Composite". – I was not able to introduce this species in the synopsis.

== Biology ==
The habitat consists of forests.

The larvae feed on Triumfetta species.

== Taxonomy ==
Acraea sotikensis is a member of the Acraea bonasia species group; see Acraea. See also Pierre & Bernaud, 2014

== See also ==
- Sotik Constituency
