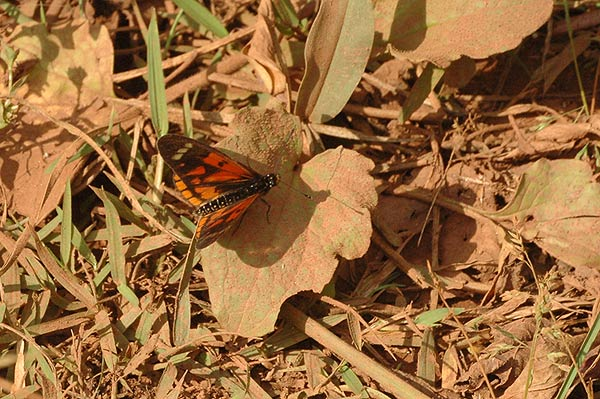

Scientific classification
- Kingdom: Animalia
- Phylum: Arthropoda
- Class: Insecta
- Order: Lepidoptera
- Family: Nymphalidae
- Genus: Acraea
- Species: A. amicitiae

Binomial name
- Acraea amicitiae Heron, 1909

Synonyms
- Acraea (Actinote) amicitiae; Acraea polychroma Rebel, 1911; Acrea amicitiae polychroma f. flavina Jackson, 1956; Acraea amicitiae f. lutea Berger, 1981; Acraea amicitiae f. alba Berger, 1981; Acraea amicitiae f. intermedia Berger, 1981

= Acraea amicitiae =

Species of butterfly

Acraea amicitiae is a butterfly of the family Nymphalidae. It is found in the Afrotropical realm (Zaire and Uganda).

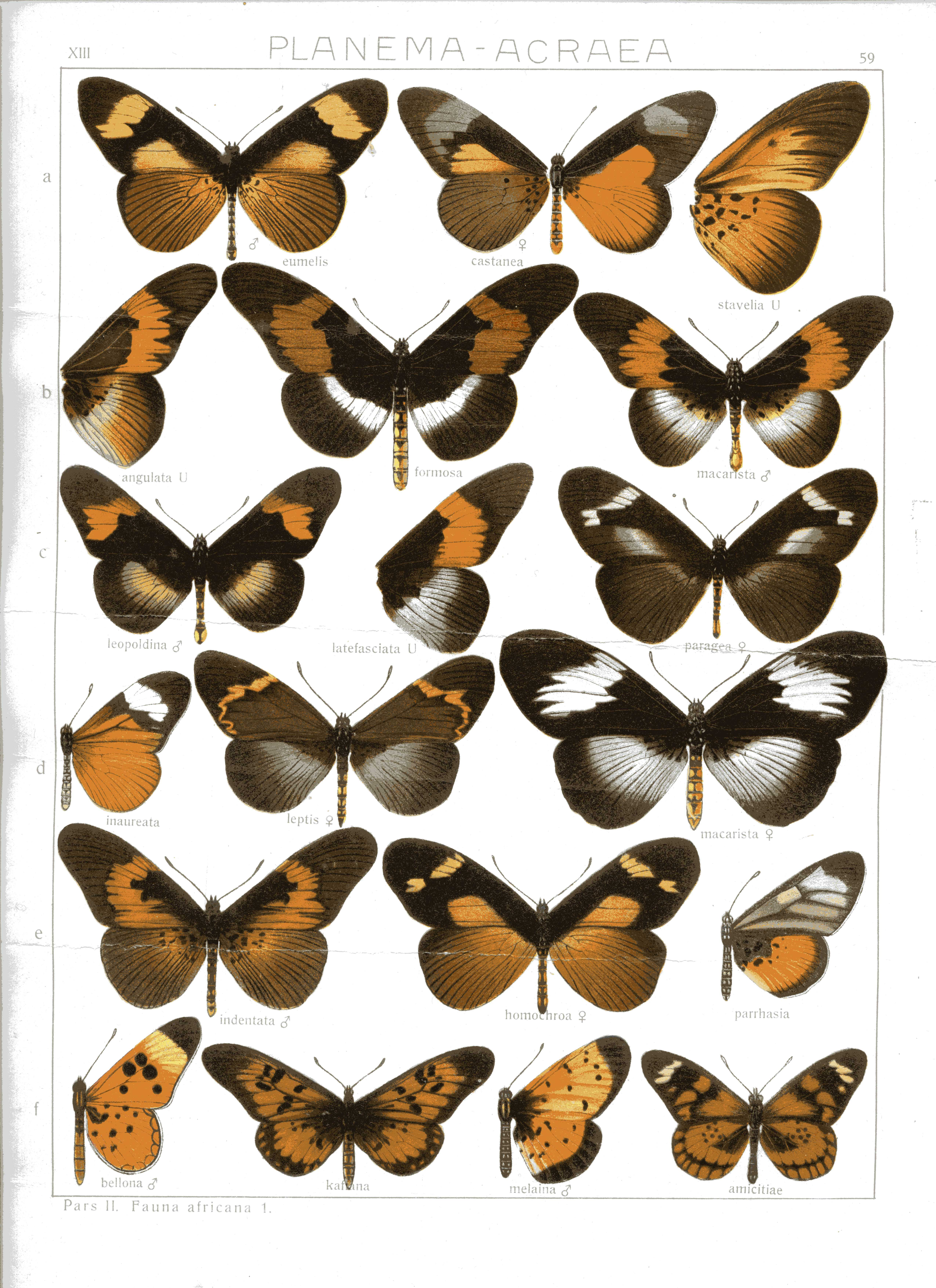
Acraea amicitiae

== Description ==
A. amicitiae Heron (= polychroma Rebel ) (59 f). Forewing above black in the basal half with 5 large, angular brown-red spots, two in 1 b, two in the cell and one in the middle of cellule 2, and in the apical half with three small diaphanous spots in 4 to 6. Hindwing above brown-red, in the basal part of cellules 1 a to 2 as far as vein 3 black and with free black discal dots in (4) 5 to 7; before the distal margin with a thick black submarginal line, which is connected with the distal margin by the black veins; on the under surface the basal part as far as the discal dots and the marginal band are dull grey-brown and the interspace forms an anteriorly widened light grey-yellow median band; basal and discal dots all free. Ruwenzori and in the mountainous country at the north-west end of Lake Tanganyika.

== Biology ==
The habitat consists of montane forests. Adult males mud puddle.

== Taxonomy ==
It is a member of the Acraea jodutta species group - but see also Pierre & Bernaud, 2014
