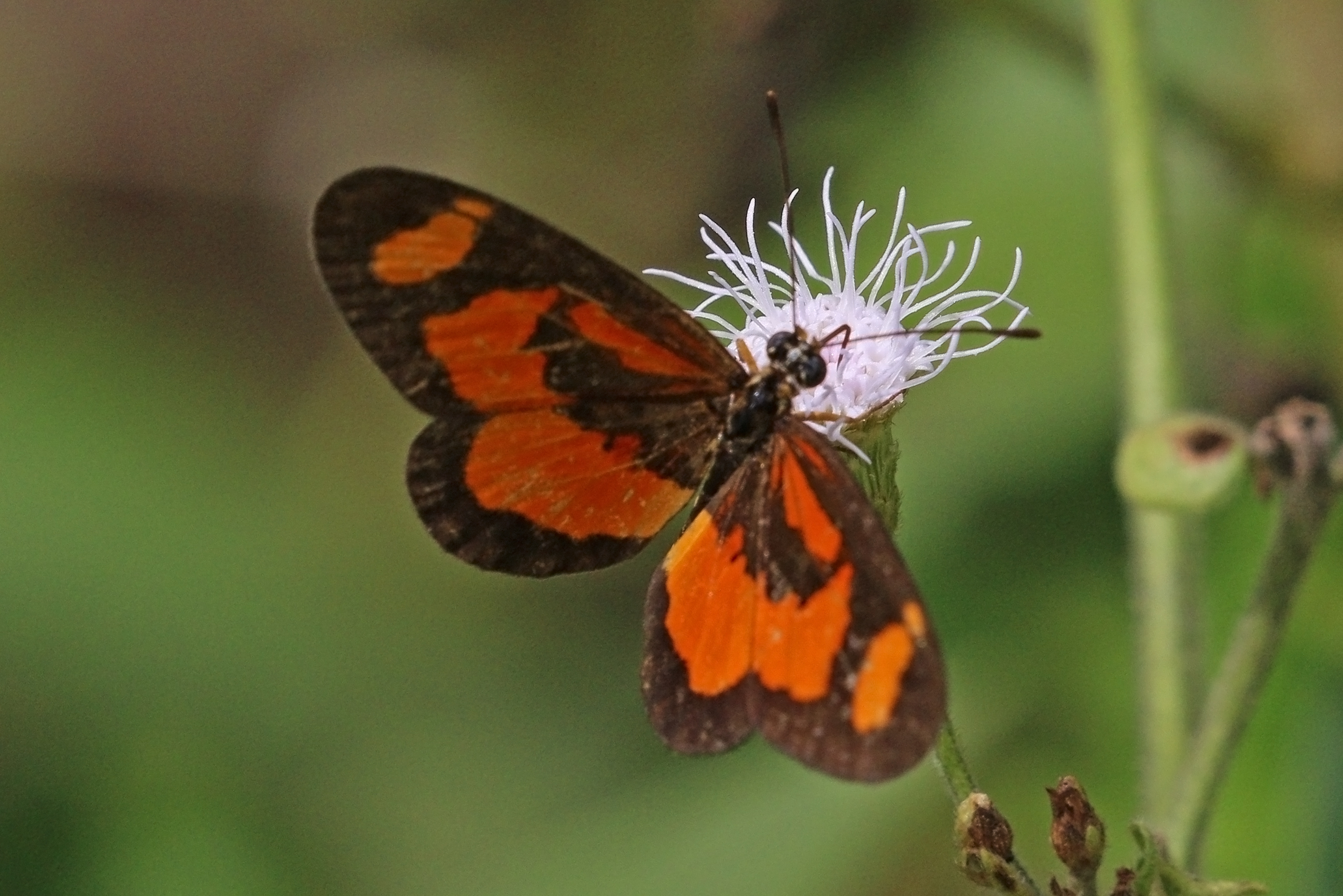

- males in Kakum National Park, Ghana

Scientific classification
- Kingdom: Animalia
- Phylum: Arthropoda
- Clade: Pancrustacea
- Class: Insecta
- Order: Lepidoptera
- Family: Nymphalidae
- Genus: Acraea
- Species: A. bonasia

Binomial name
- Acraea bonasia (Fabricius, 1775)

Synonyms
- Papilio bonasia Fabricius, 1775; Acraea (Actinote) bonasia; Papilio cynthius Drury, 1782; Acraea praeponina Staudinger, 1896; Acraea bonasia siabona Suffert, 1904; Acraea bonasia ab. implicata Schultze, 1923; Acraea bonasia ab. tristis Schultze, 1923; Acraea bonasia f. flavistrigata Le Cerf, 1927; Acraea bonasia bonasia ab. obscura Dufrane, 1945

= Acraea bonasia =

Bonasia acraea

Species of butterfly

Acraea bonasia, the bonasia acraea, is a butterfly in the family Nymphalidae which is native to the African tropics and subtropics.

== Range ==
It is found in Senegal, the Gambia, Guinea-Bissau, Guinea, Sierra Leone, Liberia, Ivory Coast, Ghana, Togo, Nigeria, Cameroon, Equatorial Guinea, Angola, the Democratic Republic of the Congo, Sudan, Uganda, Rwanda, Burundi, Kenya, Tanzania, Zambia and Ethiopia.

== Description ==
A. bonasia is nearly allied both to Acraea alicia and to Acraea sotikensis and all three probably belong to one species. From alicia, which Eltringham regards only as a form of bonasia, it differs in having the base of cellule 2 of the forewing black and from sotikensis it seems to me only to differ in having the light longitudinal stripe at the median of the forewing above completely united with the hindmarginal spot. On this ground I also refer praeponina Stgr. to sotikensis.

- bonasia F. (56 b). Markings of the upper surface yellow-red; the black dots on the underside of the hindwing at least in the cell and cellule 7 connected by red spots or streaks; the marginal band on the underside of the hindwing with light streaks or lines at the veins. The female either only differs from the male in having light marginal spots on the upperside of the hindwing or (ab. cynthius Drury) has the light markings of the upper surface light yellowish. A common and widely distributed species. Sierra Leone to the Congo, Toro and German East Africa.
- female ab. siabona Suff. differs in the yellow subapical band of the forewing and the broader, more variegated marginal band on the underside of the hindwing. Togo.
- banka Eltr. differs in having the marginal bands of the under surface pure black without stripes and the black dots on the hindwing beneath united into a subbasal band. Abyssinia.
- Larva bluish white with more or less developed dark longitudinal lines; the spines on segments 1 to 3 and 11 to 13 blackish, the rest light.

Torben Larsen developed a species numbering system for his 2005 publication Butterflies of West Africa. This species is #1165. The 'Larsen' numbers have since been used with permission in A Sharp Eye on Butterflies of Ghana.

== Biology ==
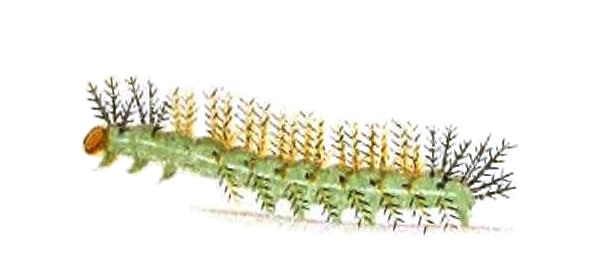

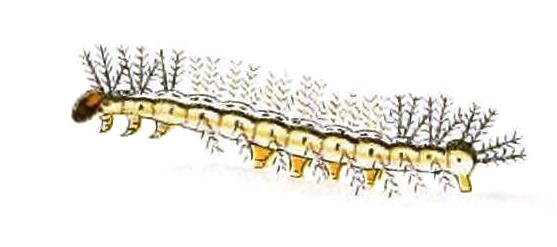
Larvae (pale and dark forms),
illustrated in Eltringham (1912)

The habitat consists of forests.

Adult males mud-puddle and visit patches of urine and animal excrement.

The larvae feed on Clappertonia ficifolia, Triumfetta macrophilla, Triumfetta ruwenzorensis, Triumfetta brachyceras, Triumfetta and Hibiscus species.

== Subspecies ==
- Acraea bonasia bonasia — Senegal, Gambia, Guinea-Bissau, Guinea, Sierra Leone, Liberia, Ivory Coast, Ghana, Togo, Nigeria, Cameroon, Bioko, Angola, Democratic Republic of the Congo, Sudan (south), Uganda (west), Rwanda, Burundi, western Kenya, north-western Tanzania, north-eastern Zambia
- Acraea bonasia banka Eltringham, 1912 — Ethiopia: highlands

== Taxonomy ==
Acraea bonasia is the nominate member of the Acraea bonasia species group see Acraea.

Classification of Acraea by Henning, Henning & Williams, Pierre. J. & Bernaud

- Hyalites (group bonasia) Henning, 1993
- Acraea (Actinote) (subgroup bonasia) Pierre & Bernaud, 2013
- Telchinia (Telchinia) Henning & Williams, 2010
- Acraea (Actinote) groupe serena sub group bonasia Pierre & Bernaud, 2014
