= Harpendyreus berger =

Scientific classification
- Kingdom: Animalia
- Phylum: Arthropoda
- Class: Insecta
- Order: Lepidoptera
- Family: Lycaenidae
- Genus: Harpendyreus
- Species: H. berger

Binomial name
- Harpendyreus berger Stempffer, 1976

Species of butterfly

Harpendyreus berger is a butterfly in the family Lycaenidae. It is found in north-central Tanzania.
