= Euphaedra christyi =

Scientific classification
- Kingdom: Animalia
- Phylum: Arthropoda
- Class: Insecta
- Order: Lepidoptera
- Family: Nymphalidae
- Genus: Euphaedra
- Species: E. christyi

Binomial name
- Euphaedra christyi Sharpe, 1904

Synonyms
- Euphaedra (Gausapia) christyi

Species of butterfly

Euphaedra christyi is a butterfly in the family Nymphalidae. It is found in Uganda, from the western part of the country to the Kalizu, Kibule and Kayonza forests.

— ab. Christyi E. Sharpe only differs from Euphaedra zaddachi Dew. in having both surfaces of the hindwing ochre-yellow instead of red, only the underside red at the costal margin. Toro.
