= Harpendyreus boma =

Scientific classification
- Kingdom: Animalia
- Phylum: Arthropoda
- Class: Insecta
- Order: Lepidoptera
- Family: Lycaenidae
- Genus: Harpendyreus
- Species: H. boma

Binomial name
- Harpendyreus boma (Bethune-Baker, 1926)

Synonyms
- Cyclyrius boma Bethune-Baker, 1926

Species of butterfly

Harpendyreus boma is a butterfly in the family Lycaenidae. It is found in Tanzania (from the southern part of the country to the highlands).
