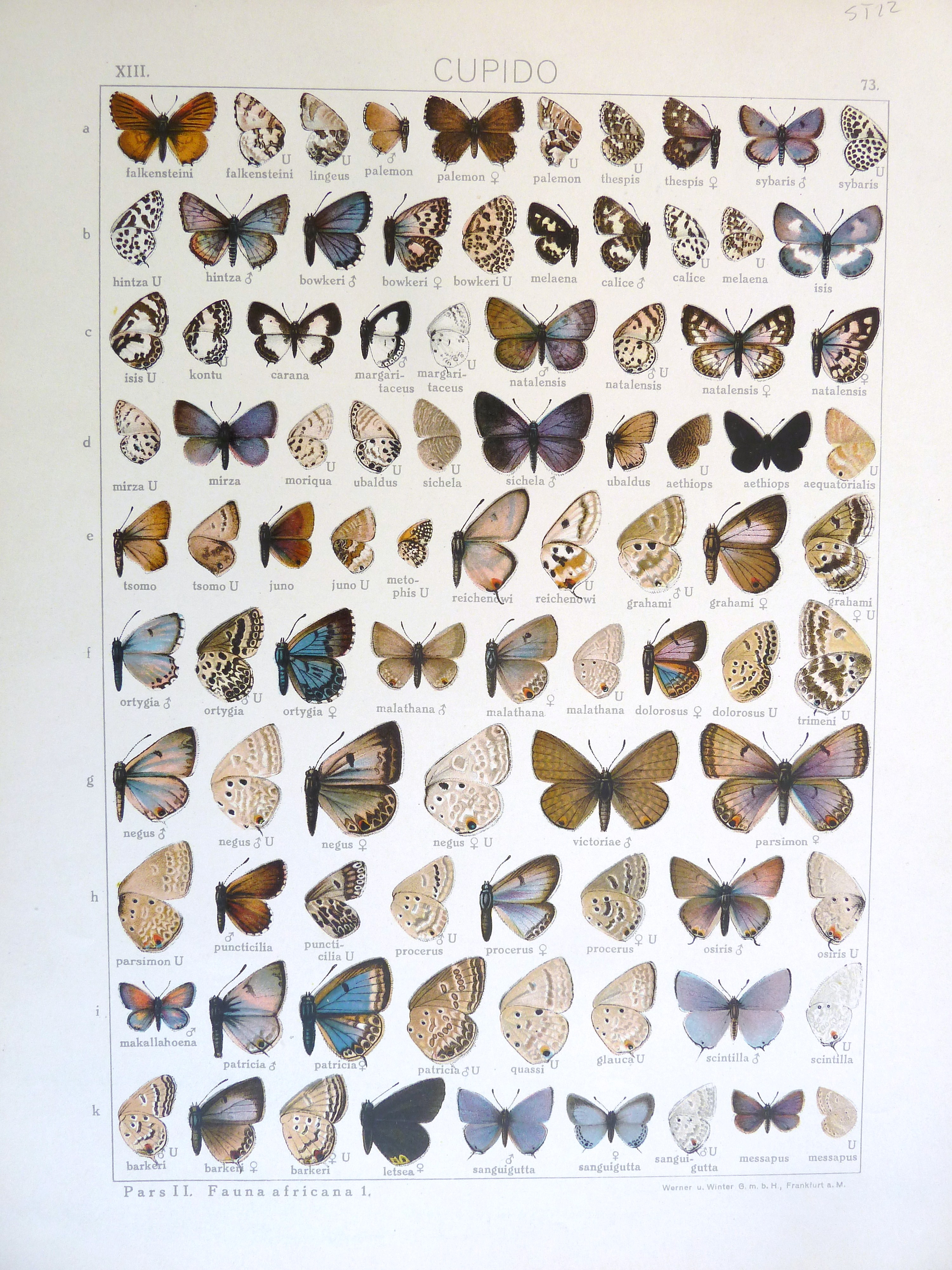
- e

Scientific classification
- Domain: Eukaryota
- Kingdom: Animalia
- Phylum: Arthropoda
- Class: Insecta
- Order: Lepidoptera
- Family: Lycaenidae
- Genus: Harpendyreus
- Species: H. tsomo

Binomial name
- Harpendyreus tsomo (Trimen, 1868)

Synonyms
- Lycaena tsomo Trimen, 1868

= Harpendyreus tsomo =

Species of butterfly

Harpendyreus tsomo, the Tsomo blue, is a butterfly of the family Lycaenidae. It is mainly found in Lesotho, but also in South Africa where it is known from high altitudes in the Orange Free State and the East Cape.

The wingspan is 17–22 mm for males and 18–23 mm for females. Adults are on wing from October to March, with a peak from November to December.

The larvae feed on young leaves, flowers and seeds of Mentha species.
