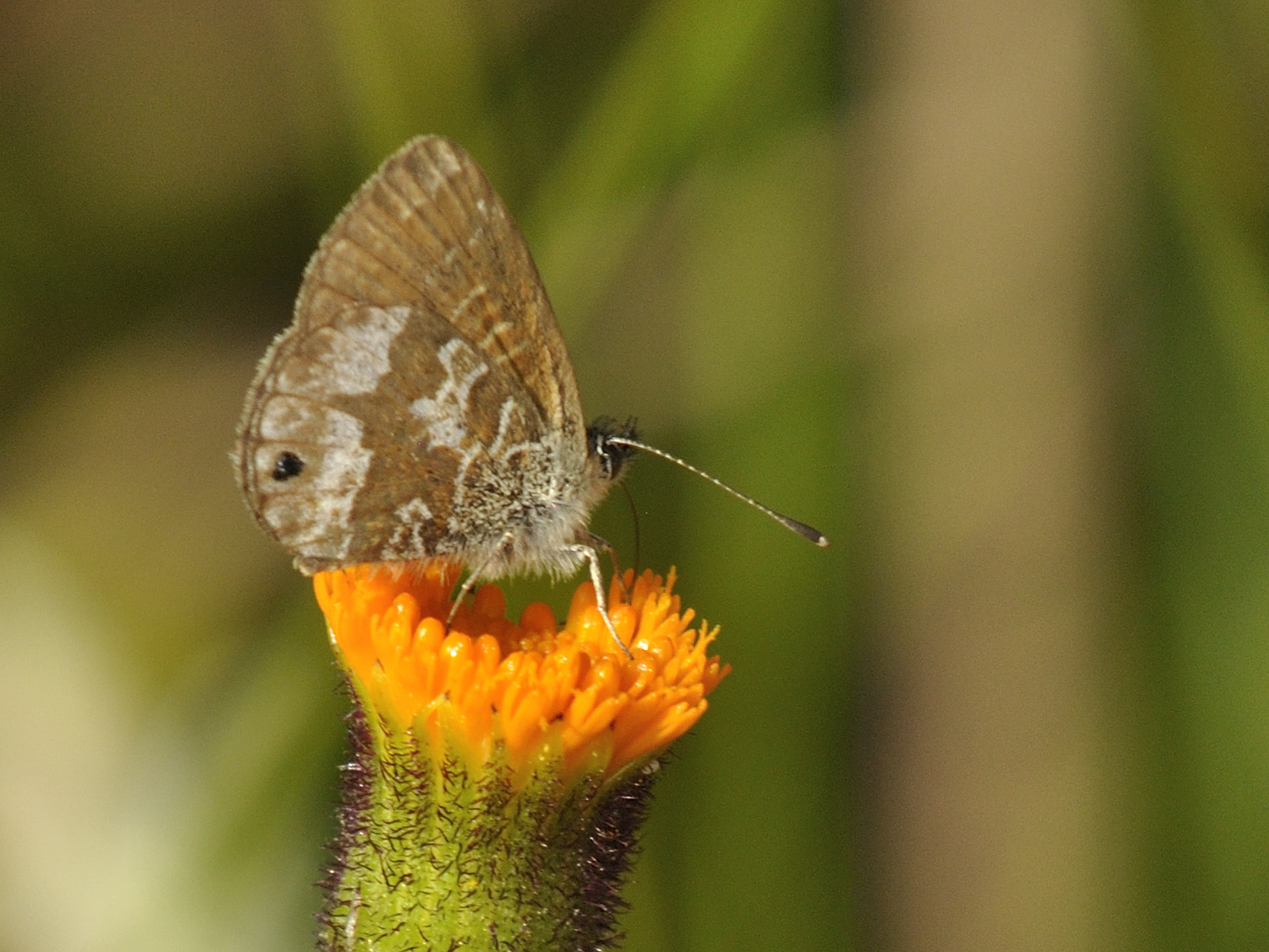

Scientific classification
- Domain: Eukaryota
- Kingdom: Animalia
- Phylum: Arthropoda
- Class: Insecta
- Order: Lepidoptera
- Family: Lycaenidae
- Genus: Harpendyreus
- Species: H. juno

Binomial name
- Harpendyreus juno (Butler, 1897)

Synonyms
- Cyclyrius juno Butler, 1897

= Harpendyreus juno =

Species of butterfly

Harpendyreus juno is a butterfly in the family Lycaenidae. It is found in southern Tanzania, northern Malawi and Zambia.
