= Harpendyreus meruana =

Scientific classification
- Kingdom: Animalia
- Phylum: Arthropoda
- Class: Insecta
- Order: Lepidoptera
- Family: Lycaenidae
- Genus: Harpendyreus
- Species: H. meruana

Binomial name
- Harpendyreus meruana (Aurivillius, 1910)

Synonyms
- Cupido juno r. meruana Aurivillius, 1910

Species of butterfly

Harpendyreus meruana is a butterfly in the family Lycaenidae. It is found in Tanzania (from the northern part of the country to Mount Meru).
