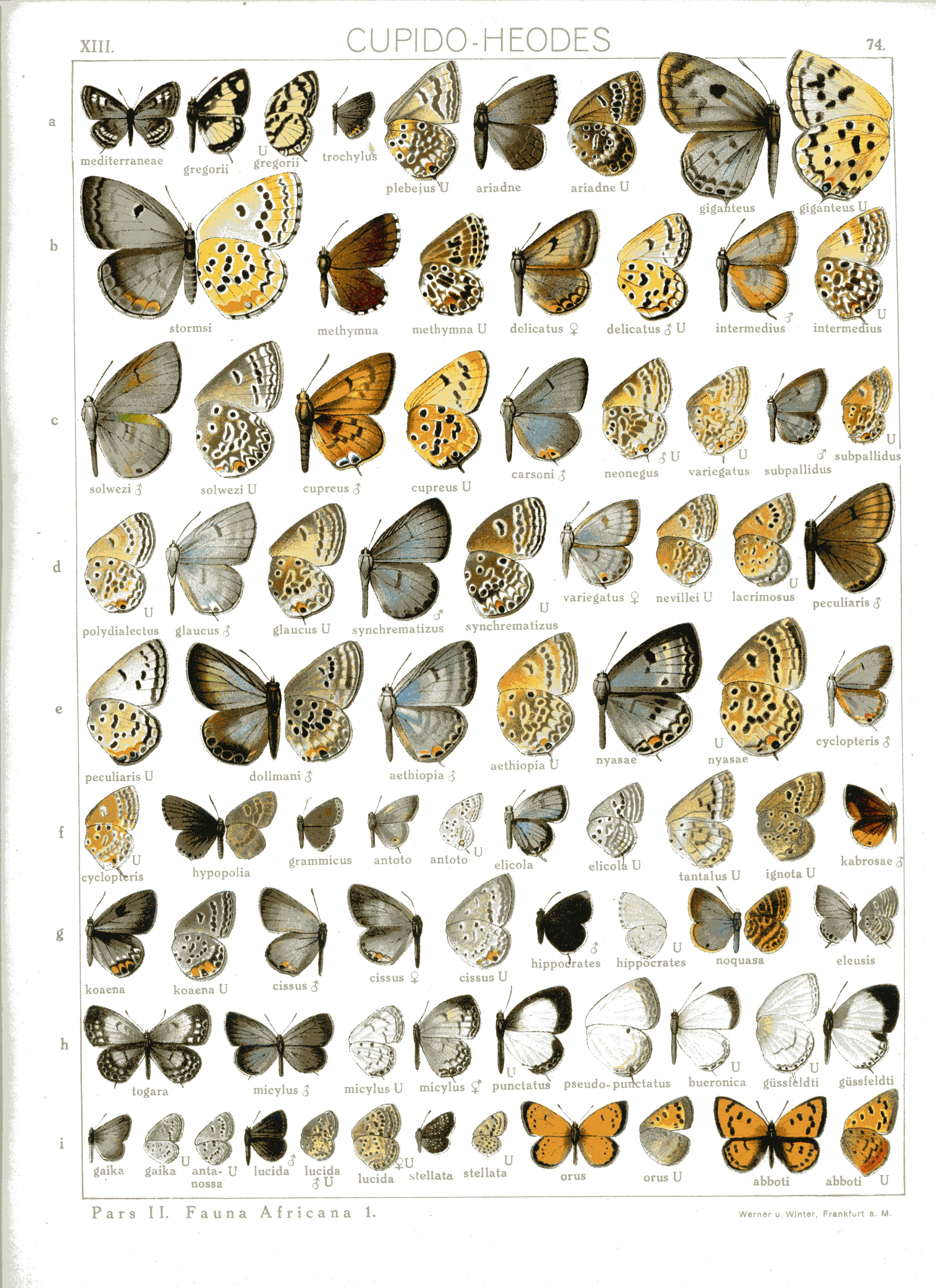
- g

Scientific classification
- Domain: Eukaryota
- Kingdom: Animalia
- Phylum: Arthropoda
- Class: Insecta
- Order: Lepidoptera
- Family: Lycaenidae
- Genus: Harpendyreus
- Species: H. noquasa

Binomial name
- Harpendyreus noquasa (Trimen & Bowker, 1887)

Synonyms
- Lycaena noquasa Trimen & Bowker, 1887

= Harpendyreus noquasa =

Species of butterfly

Harpendyreus noquasa, the marsh blue, is a butterfly of the family Lycaenidae. It is found in South Africa, from the KwaZulu-Natal Drakensberg, north along the escarpment to Mpumalanga.

The wingspan is 17–23 mm for males and 18–24 mm for females. Adults are on wing from September to March in two main generations, one in spring (from September to November) and again in late summer (in March).

The larvae feed on Alchemilla capensis.
