= Harpendyreus hazelae =

Scientific classification
- Domain: Eukaryota
- Kingdom: Animalia
- Phylum: Arthropoda
- Class: Insecta
- Order: Lepidoptera
- Family: Lycaenidae
- Genus: Harpendyreus
- Species: H. hazelae

Binomial name
- Harpendyreus hazelae Stempffer, 1973

Species of butterfly

Harpendyreus hazelae is a butterfly in the family Lycaenidae. It is found in Malawi and Zambia.
