= Harpendyreus kisaba =

Scientific classification
- Domain: Eukaryota
- Kingdom: Animalia
- Phylum: Arthropoda
- Class: Insecta
- Order: Lepidoptera
- Family: Lycaenidae
- Genus: Harpendyreus
- Species: H. kisaba

Binomial name
- Harpendyreus kisaba (Joicey & Talbot, 1921)

Synonyms
- Catochrysops kisaba Joicey & Talbot, 1921; Cyclirius juno ruandensis Joicey & Talbot, 1924

Species of butterfly

Harpendyreus kisaba is a butterfly in the family of Lycaenidae. It is found in Kivu, in the Democratic Republic of the Congo and in Rwanda.
