= Ernst Suffert =

German entomologist

Ernst Suffert (fl. 1900) was a German entomologist who specialised in studies of Lepidoptera.

Ernst Suffert described many new species of African butterflies and moths, including Papilio chrapkowskii, Papilio filaprae, Mylothris ertli and Mylothris schumanni. His collection was purchased by James John Joicey.

== Works ==
- Suffert, Ernst; & Zocher, H. (1924): Morphologie und Optik der Schmetterlingsschuppen insbesondere die Schillerfarben de Schmetterlinge. Z. Morphol. Öekol. Tiere 1, pp. 171–308
- Suffert, E., 1900 Eine neue Aberration des Danaus dorippus Klug aus Deutsch-Ostafrika. Berliner Entomologische Zeitschrift 45:115-116.
- Suffert, E., 1904 Neue afrikanisches Tagfalter aus dem Kon. Zool. Museum, Berlin, und meiner Sammlung. Deutsche Entomologische Zeitschrift, Iris 17:12-107.
- Suffert, E., 1904 Neue Nymphaliden aus Africa. Deutsche Entomologische Zeitschrift, Iris 17:108-123.
- Suffert, E. (1904) Neue Tagfalter aus Deutsch-Ost-Africa. Deutsche Entomologische Zeitschrift, Iris 17:124-132
- Die Naturwissenschaften
