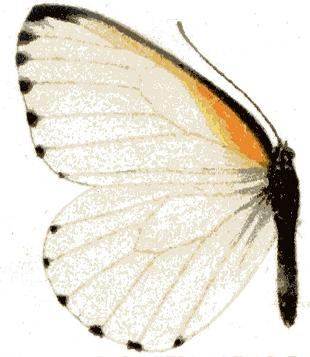
- Male
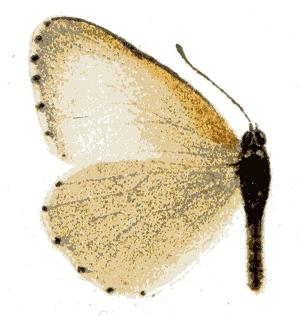
- Female

Scientific classification
- Kingdom: Animalia
- Phylum: Arthropoda
- Clade: Pancrustacea
- Class: Insecta
- Order: Lepidoptera
- Family: Pieridae
- Genus: Mylothris
- Species: M. rubricosta

Binomial name
- Mylothris rubricosta (Mabille, 1890)

Synonyms
- Pieris rubricosta Mabille, 1890; Mylothris mackenziana Sharpe, 1891; Mylothris berenice r. berenicides Holland, 1896; Mylothris sulphureotincta Strand, 1909; Mylothris bernice rubricosta f. fuscescens Talbot, 1944; Mylothris bernice f. aethra Stoneham, 1957

= Mylothris rubricosta =

Species of butterfly

Mylothris rubricosta, the eastern swamp dotted border or streaked dotted border, is a butterfly in the family Pieridae. It is found in Sudan, Ethiopia, Uganda, Rwanda, Burundi, the Democratic Republic of the Congo, Kenya, Tanzania, Malawi, Zambia, Mozambique, Botswana and Zimbabwe. The habitat consists of papyrus swamps.

Adults have a weak flight and stay close to the ground. Adults feed on the flower nectar of Persicaria barbata. They are on wing from August to March.

The larvae feed on Persicaria barbata species.

== Subspecies ==
- Mylothris rubricosta rubricosta (southern Sudan, Ethiopia, Uganda, Rwanda, Burundi, Democratic Republic of the Congo, Kenya, Tanzania, Zambia, Mozambique)
- Mylothris rubricosta attenuata Talbot, 1944 (eastern Tanzania, Malawi, north-western Zimbabwe, Botswana)
- Mylothris rubricosta pulchra Berger, 1981 (Democratic Republic of the Congo, western Tanzania)
