= Harpendyreus marlieri =

Scientific classification
- Kingdom: Animalia
- Phylum: Arthropoda
- Class: Insecta
- Order: Lepidoptera
- Family: Lycaenidae
- Genus: Harpendyreus
- Species: H. marlieri

Binomial name
- Harpendyreus marlieri Stempffer, 1961

Species of butterfly

Harpendyreus marlieri is a butterfly in the family Lycaenidae. It is found in the Democratic Republic of the Congo.
