= Mylothris ertli =

Scientific classification
- Kingdom: Animalia
- Phylum: Arthropoda
- Clade: Pancrustacea
- Class: Insecta
- Order: Lepidoptera
- Family: Pieridae
- Genus: Mylothris
- Species: M. ertli

Binomial name
- Mylothris ertli Suffert, 1904

Species of butterfly

Mylothris ertli is a butterfly in the family Pieridae. It is found in Tanzania, from the southern shores of Lake Victoria to the Kigoma and Mpanda Districts.
