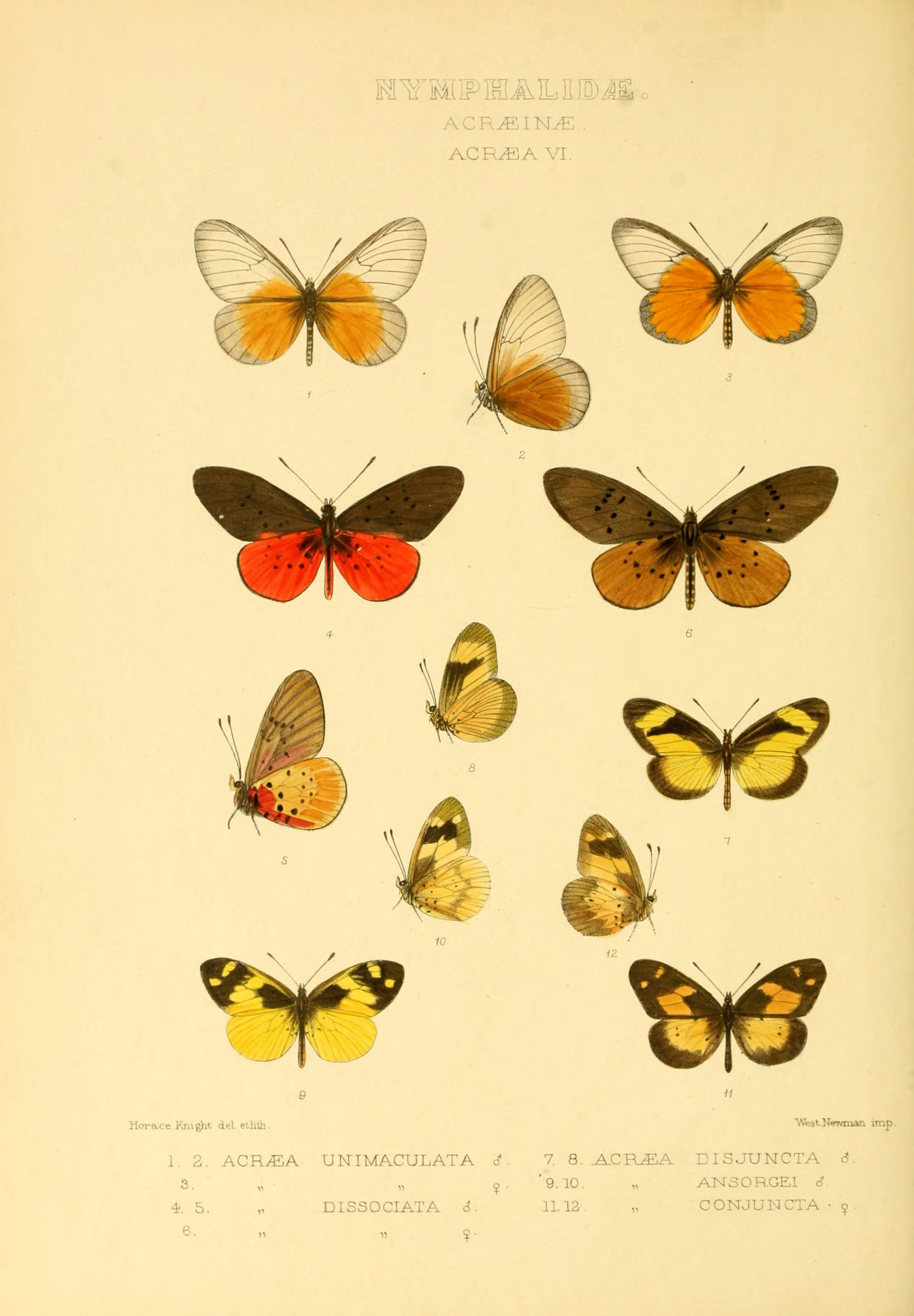
- Figures 4, 5 and 6 as Acraea dissociata

Scientific classification
- Kingdom: Animalia
- Phylum: Arthropoda
- Class: Insecta
- Order: Lepidoptera
- Family: Nymphalidae
- Genus: Acraea
- Species: A. asboloplintha

Binomial name
- Acraea asboloplintha Karsch, 1894

Synonyms
- Acraea (Acraea) asboloplintha; Acraea dissociata Grose-Smith, 1898

= Acraea asboloplintha =

Black-winged acraea

Species of butterfly

Acraea asboloplintha, the black-winged acraea, is a butterfly in the family Nymphalidae. It is found in the Democratic Republic of the Congo, Rwanda, Burundi, Uganda, Kenya and Tanzania.

== Description ==
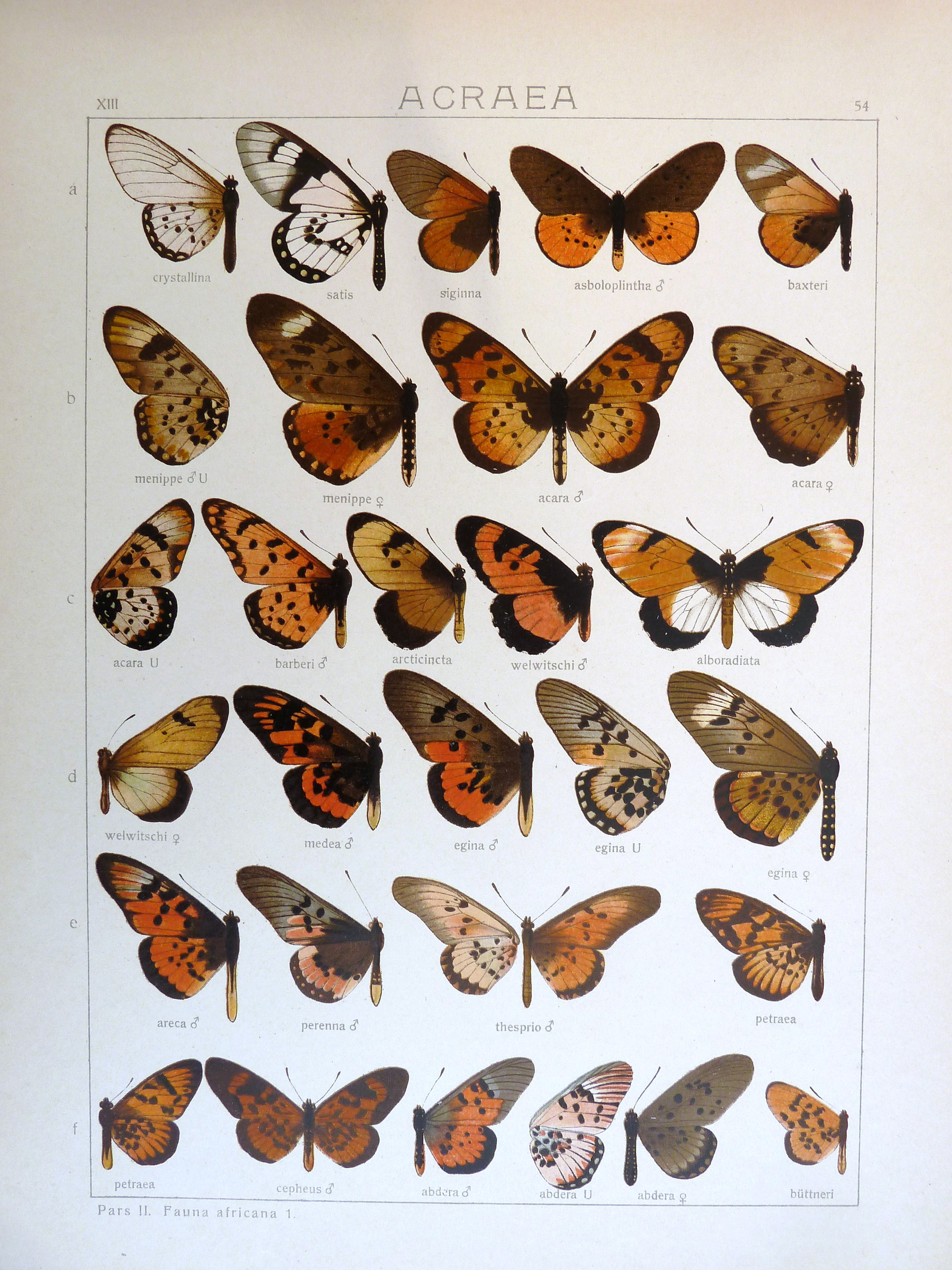
Seitz Fauna Africana taf 54

A. asboloplintha Karsch (54 a). A very distinct species. Forewing above unicolorous dark smoky black with indistinct discal dots and occasionally at the hindmargin in the middle of 1 a with red-yellow scaling, beneath light yellowish brown with distinct discal dots, black fringes and very fine marginal line. Hindwing above light orange-yellow, at the base black as far as vein 2 and with free black discal dots and black fringes, beneath at the base and inner margin red, then light yellowish and beyond the discal dots with light orange-yellow transverse band 4 mm. in breadth, which does not reach the distal margin, so that a light yellowish transverse band is formed. In the female the hindwing above is often yellow-brown instead of orange-yellow. Ruwenzori, Uganda and British East Africa - rubescens Eltr. differs in having the hindwing above rose-coloured, while the forewing has a hindmarginal spot of the same colour, which covers the base of cellule 2 and also a part of the cell. In the female the corresponding parts are white. British East Africa.

== Subspecies ==
- Acraea asboloplintha asboloplintha (Rwanda, Burundi, Uganda, western Kenya, north-western Tanzania, Democratic Republic of the Congo: east to Ituri and Kivu)
- Acraea asboloplintha rubescens Trimen, 1909 (Kenya: highlands east of the Rift Valley)

== Biology ==
The habitat consists of forests and heavy woodland.

The larvae feed on Basananthe zanzibarica and Adenia lobata.

== Taxonomy ==
It is a member of the Acraea caecilia species group. See also Pierre & Bernaud, 2014.
