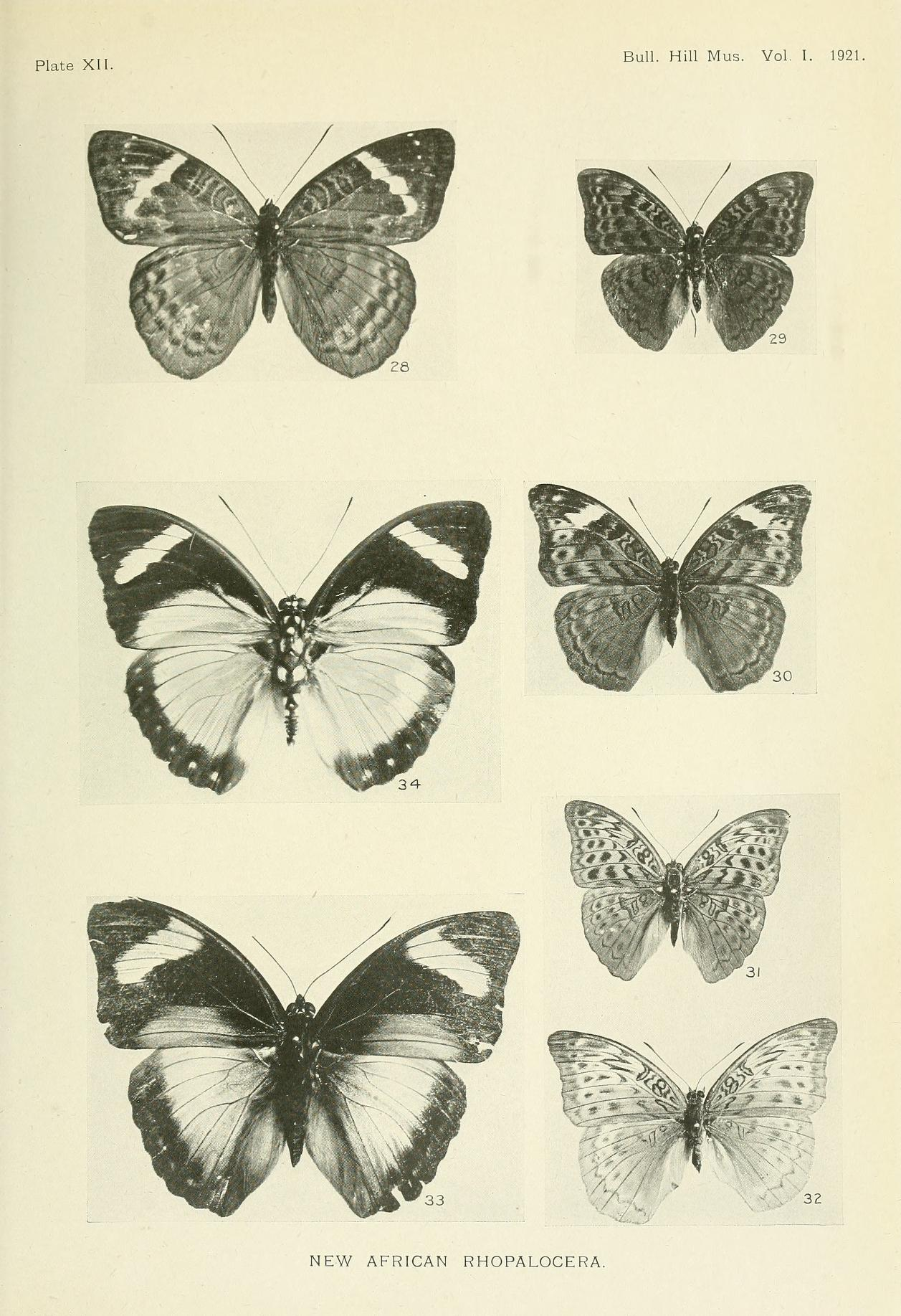
- Figure 33 (male) - plate accompanying the original description

Scientific classification
- Kingdom: Animalia
- Phylum: Arthropoda
- Class: Insecta
- Order: Lepidoptera
- Family: Nymphalidae
- Genus: Euphaedra
- Species: E. phosphor

Binomial name
- Euphaedra phosphor Joicey & Talbot, 1921

Synonyms
- Euphaedra ceres f. phosphor Joicey & Talbot, 1921; Euphaedra (Euphaedrana) phosphor

= Euphaedra phosphor =

Species of butterfly

Euphaedra phosphor is a butterfly in the family Nymphalidae. It is found in western Tanzania, Burundi and the south-eastern part of the Democratic Republic of the Congo. The habitat consists of forests, including riparian forests.

The larvae feed on Poliscias species.
