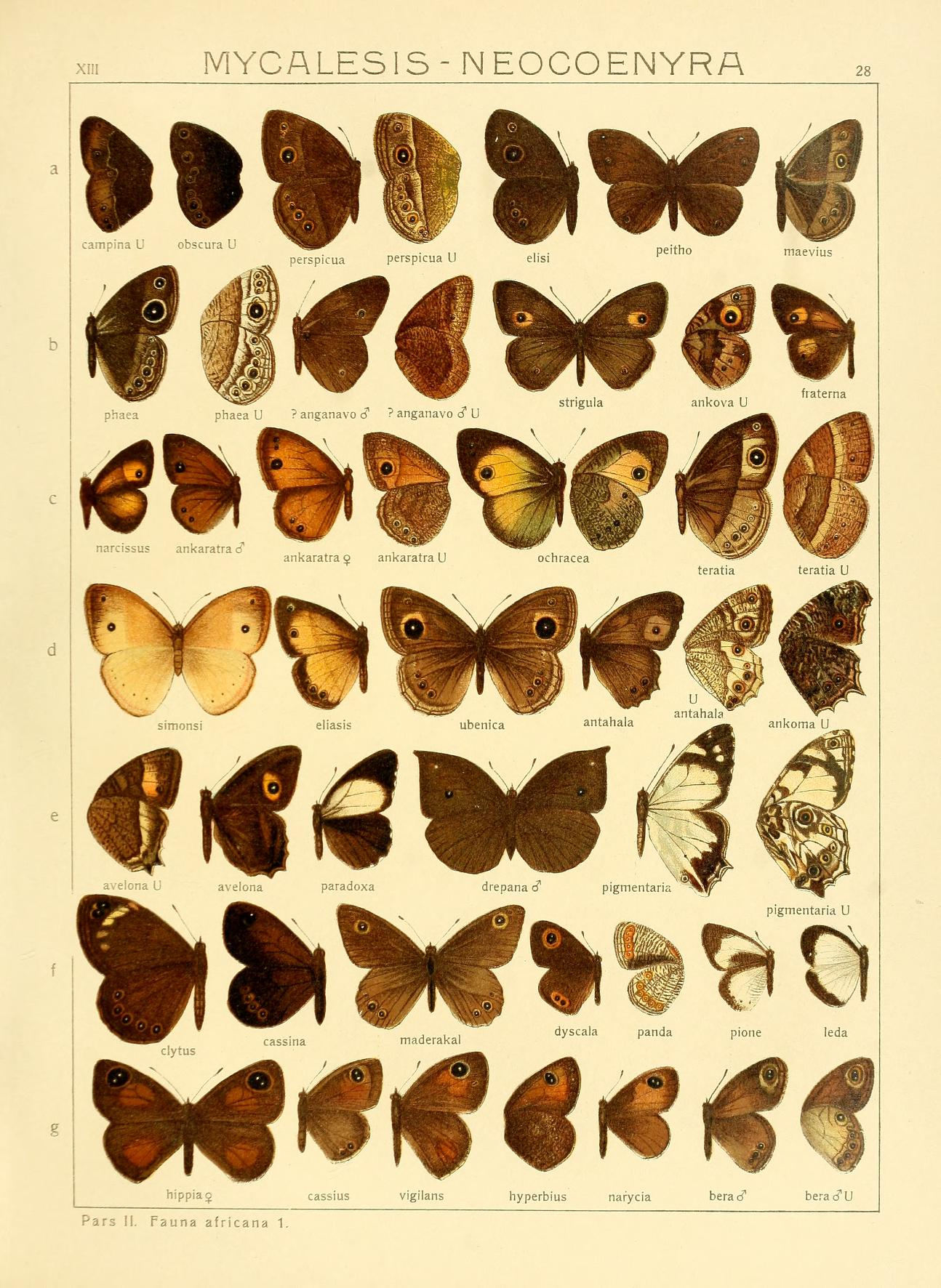
- In Adalbert Seitz's Fauna Africana

Scientific classification
- Kingdom: Animalia
- Phylum: Arthropoda
- Clade: Pancrustacea
- Class: Insecta
- Order: Lepidoptera
- Family: Nymphalidae
- Genus: Heteropsis
- Species: H. ubenica

Binomial name
- Heteropsis ubenica (Thurau, 1903)

Synonyms
- Henotesia ubenica Thurau, 1903; Henotesia ubenica ab. unicinata Thurau, 1903; Henotesia ubenica mahale Kielland, 1990; Henotesia ubenica ugandica Kielland, 1990; Henotesia ubenica uzungwa Kielland, 1990

= Heteropsis ubenica =

Species of butterfly

Heteropsis ubenica is a butterfly in the family Nymphalidae. It is found in the Democratic Republic of the Congo, Uganda, Rwanda, Burundi, Tanzania, Malawi and Zambia.

== Subspecies ==
- Heteropsis ubenica ubenica (southern Tanzania, Malawi, Zambia)
- Heteropsis ubenica mahale (Kielland, 1994) (western Tanzania)
- Heteropsis ubenica ugandica (Kielland, 1994) (eastern Democratic Republic of the Congo, western Uganda, Rwanda, Burundi, north-western Tanzania)
- Heteropsis ubenica uzungwa (Kielland, 1994) (south-central Tanzania)
