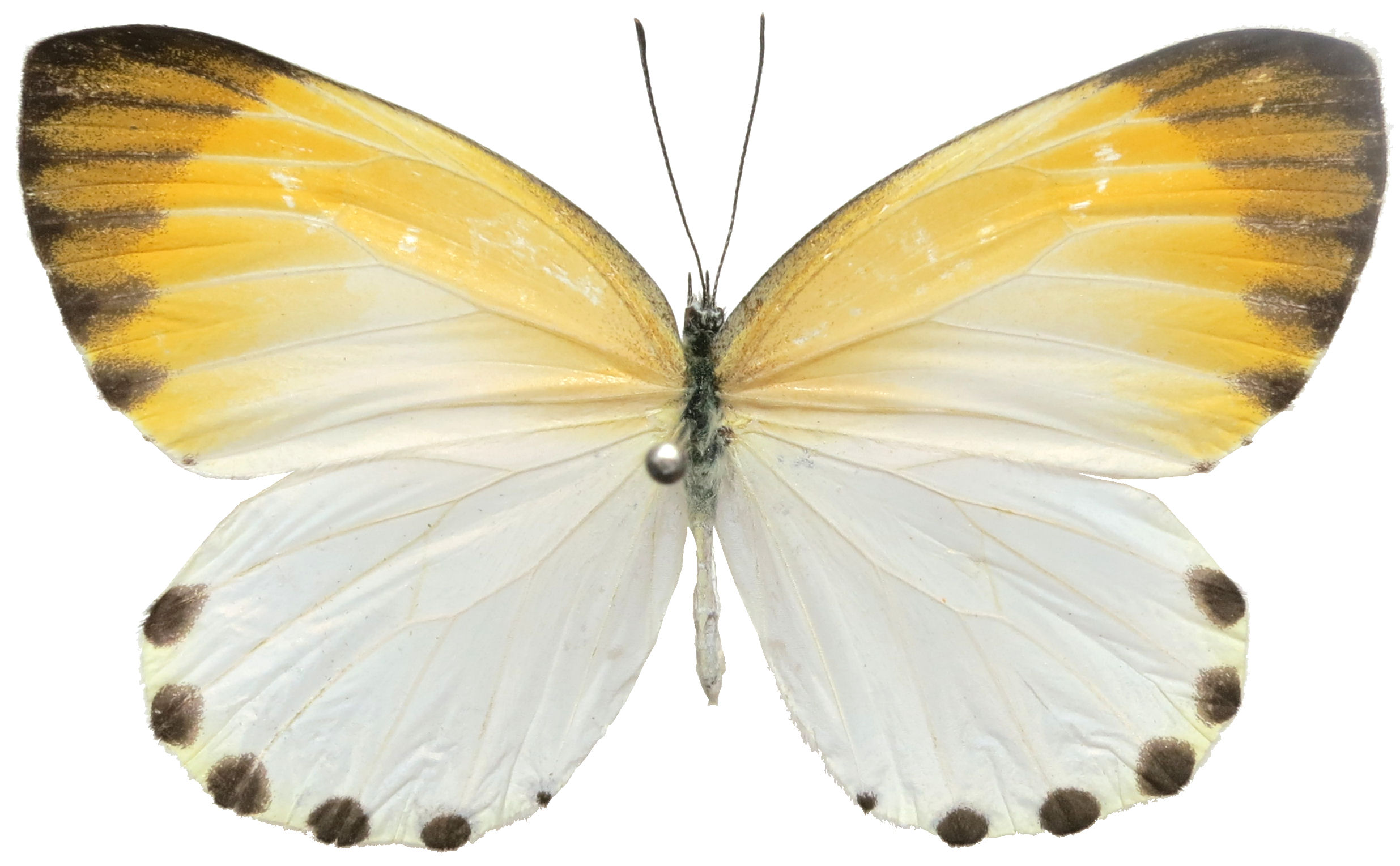
- Mylothris schumanni female - Ashanti Region, Ghana

Scientific classification
- Kingdom: Animalia
- Phylum: Arthropoda
- Clade: Pancrustacea
- Class: Insecta
- Order: Lepidoptera
- Family: Pieridae
- Genus: Mylothris
- Species: M. schumanni

Binomial name
- Mylothris schumanni Suffert, 1904

Synonyms
- Mylothris fernandina Schultze, 1914; Mylothris rhodope uniformis Talbot, 1944; Mylothris schumanni f. immaculata Berger, 1981

= Mylothris schumanni =

Species of butterfly

Mylothris schumanni, Schumann's dotted border, is a butterfly in the family Pieridae. It is found in Guinea, Liberia, Ivory Coast, Ghana, Togo, Nigeria, Cameroon, the Republic of the Congo, the Democratic Republic of the Congo, southern Sudan, Burundi, Uganda, Kenya, Tanzania and Zambia. The habitat consists of lowland forests.

Adult males have been recorded mud-puddling on river banks in dense forest.

The larvae feed on Santalales species.

== Subspecies ==
- Mylothris schumanni schumanni (Guinea, Liberia, Ivory Coast, Ghana, Togo, Nigeria, Cameroon, Republic of the Congo)
- Mylothris schumanni uniformis Talbot, 1944 (Democratic Republic of the Congo, southern Sudan, Uganda, Burundi, western Kenya, western Tanzania)
- Mylothris schumanni zairiensis Berger, 1981 (northern and central Democratic Republic of the Congo, Zambia)

Torben Larsen developed a species numbering system for his 2005 publication Butterflies of West Africa. The nominate subspecies is #111. The 'Larsen' numbers have since been used with permission in A Sharp Eye on Butterflies of Ghana.
