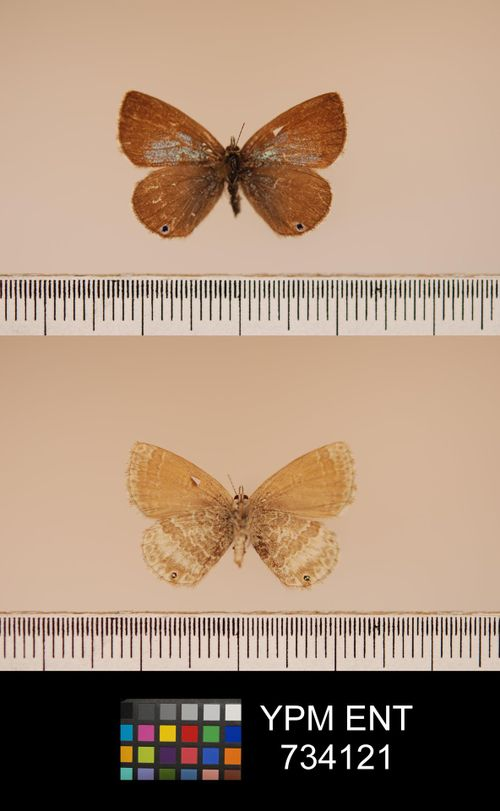

Scientific classification
- Kingdom: Animalia
- Phylum: Arthropoda
- Class: Insecta
- Order: Lepidoptera
- Family: Lycaenidae
- Genus: Harpendyreus
- Species: H. major

Binomial name
- Harpendyreus major (Joicey & Talbot, 1924)

Synonyms
- Cyclirius major Joicey & Talbot, 1924

= Harpendyreus major =

Species of butterfly

Harpendyreus major is a butterfly in the family Lycaenidae. It is found in the Democratic Republic of the Congo (from the south-eastern part of the country to Tanganyika), Rwanda, Burundi, southern Tanzania and northern Zambia.
