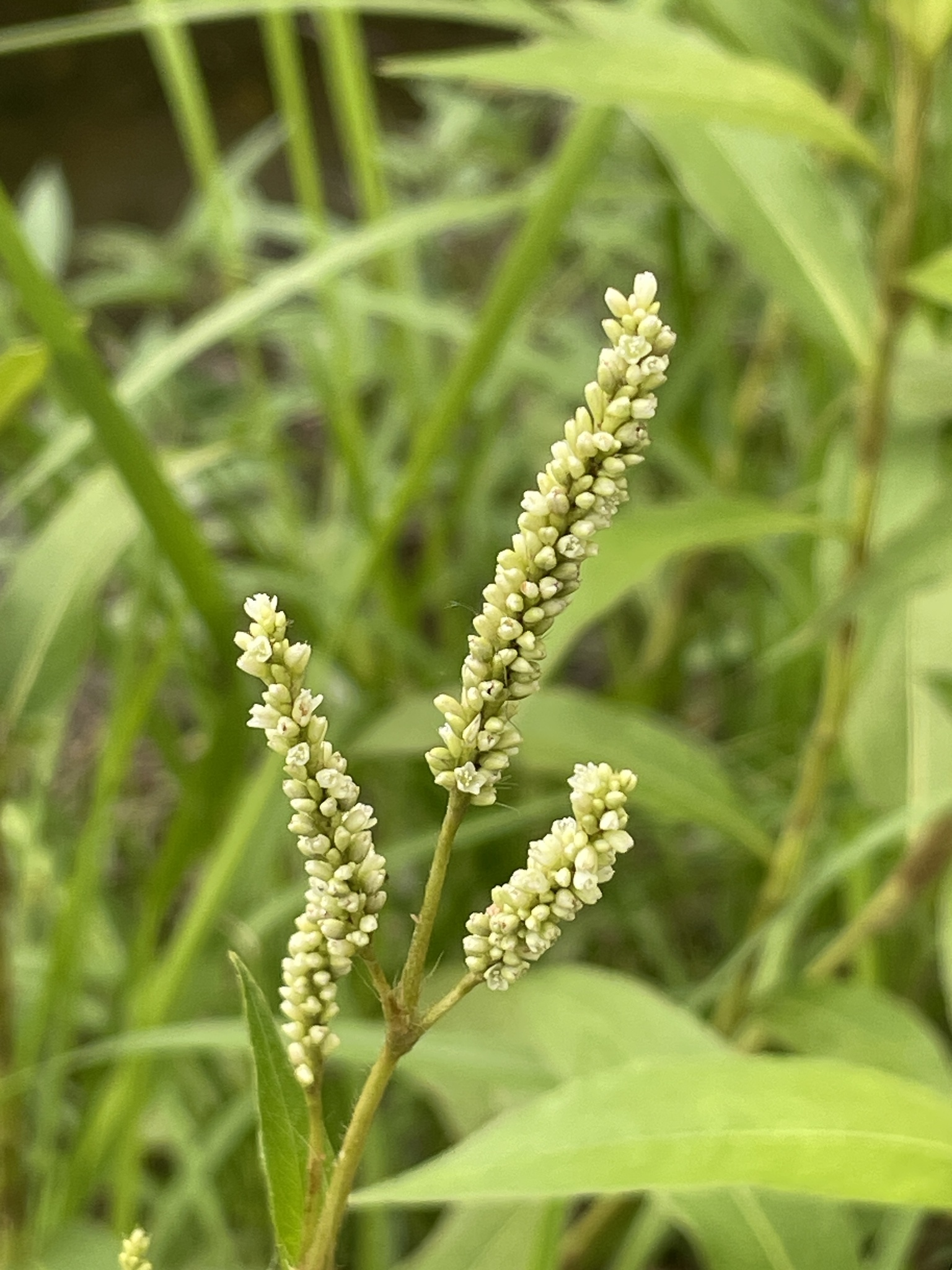

Scientific classification
- Kingdom: Plantae
- Clade: Tracheophytes
- Clade: Angiosperms
- Clade: Eudicots
- Order: Caryophyllales
- Family: Polygonaceae
- Genus: Persicaria
- Species: P. barbata

Binomial name
- Persicaria barbata (L.) H.Hara

Synonyms
- Pogalis barbata (L.) Raf.; Polygonum barbatum L.

= Persicaria barbata =

Species of plant

Persicaria barbata, commonly known as bearded knotweed, is a species of flowering plant in the family Polygonaceae. It is native to the Arabian Peninsula and much of tropical and subtropical Asia, and has also been introduced to parts of Africa and the Pacific islands. The plant typically grows in seasonally dry tropical regions, where it occurs as an erect or sometimes prostrate annual herb, 30–60 cm tall, with hairless, line-grooved stems and lance-shaped leaves up to 15 cm long. In some descriptions it is noted as a perennial, producing robust, loosely branched stems 40–90 cm tall from a creeping rhizomatous rootstock.

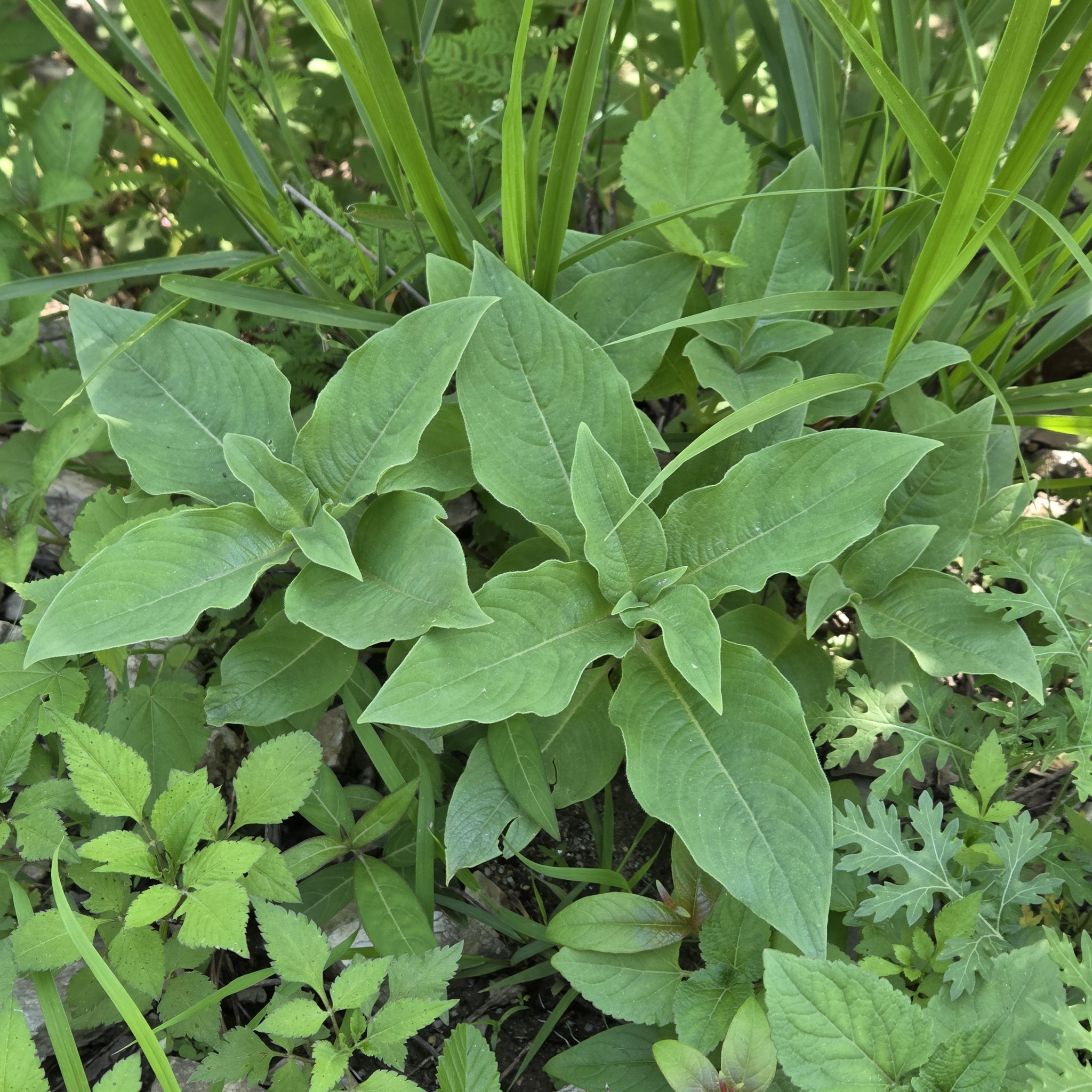

== Varieties ==
Two varieties are accepted.

- Persicaria barbata var. barbata
- Persicaria barbata var. gracilis (Danser) H.Hara
