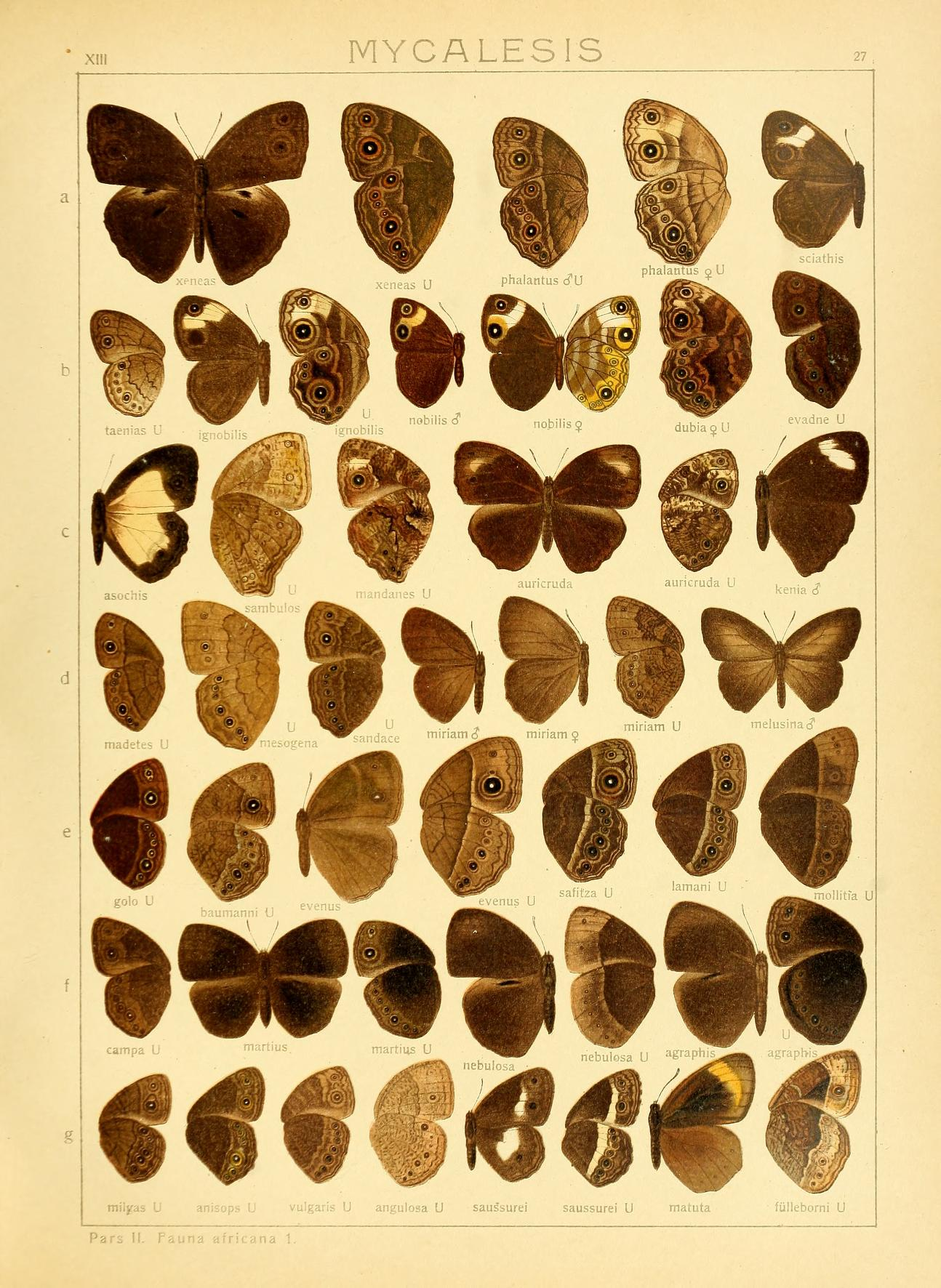

Scientific classification
- Kingdom: Animalia
- Phylum: Arthropoda
- Clade: Pancrustacea
- Class: Insecta
- Order: Lepidoptera
- Family: Nymphalidae
- Genus: Bicyclus
- Species: B. auricruda

Binomial name
- Bicyclus auricruda (Butler, 1868)

Synonyms
- Mycalesis auricruda Butler, 1868; Bicyclus auricruda fulgida Fox, 1963; Mycalesis auricruda ab. parvoocellata Grünberg, 1911

= Bicyclus auricruda =

Small marbled bush brown

Species of butterfly

Bicyclus auricruda, the small marbled bush brown, is a butterfly in the family Nymphalidae. It is found in Guinea, Liberia, Ivory Coast, Ghana, Nigeria, Cameroon, the Republic of the Congo, the Central African Republic, the Democratic Republic of the Congo, Uganda, Burundi, Kenya and Tanzania. The habitat consists of evergreen and gallery forests.

== Subspecies ==
- Bicyclus auricruda auricruda (Guinea, Liberia, Ivory Coast, Ghana)
- Bicyclus auricruda fulgidus Fox, 1963 (Nigeria, Cameroon, Congo, Central African Republic, Democratic Republic of the Congo, Uganda, Burundi, western Kenya, western Tanzania)

Torben Larsen developed a species numbering system for his 2005 publication Butterflies of West Africa. The nominate subspecies is #696. The 'Larsen' numbers have since been used with permission in A Sharp Eye on Butterflies of Ghana.
