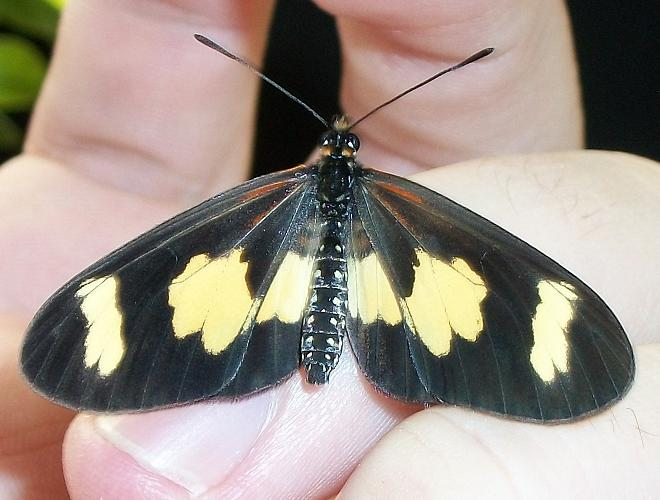
- Male

Scientific classification
- Kingdom: Animalia
- Phylum: Arthropoda
- Clade: Pancrustacea
- Class: Insecta
- Order: Lepidoptera
- Family: Nymphalidae
- Genus: Acraea
- Species: A. cabira

Binomial name
- Acraea cabira Hopffer, 1855

Synonyms
- Acraea (Actinote) cabira; Telchinia cabira (Hopffer, 1855); Hyalites cabira (Hopffer, 1855); Acraea supponina ninapo Suffert, 1904; Acraea apecida Oberthür, 1893; Acraea apecida var. flavomaculata Lanz, 1896; Acraea apecida var. natalensis Staudinger, 1896; Acraea cabira biraca Suffert, 1904; Acraea apecida var. abrupta Grünberg, 1910; Acraea cabira apecida var. swinburnei Stevenson, 1940

= Acraea cabira =

Yellow-banded acraea

Species of butterfly

Acraea cabira, also known as the yellow-banded acraea, is a butterfly of the family Nymphalidae that is native to Africa.

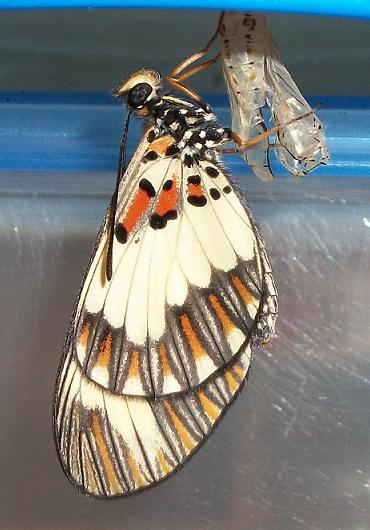
Side view of a male Acraea cabira recently hatched from its pupa

== Description ==
The wingspan is 38–44 mm (1.5–1.7 in) for males and 40–45 mm (1.6–1.8 in) for females. The male and female are very similar in colour. The upper surface of the wings is near black with large yellow patches on the forewing and hindwing. There is some reddish brown on the veins near the base of the forewings. The underside has patches of yellow corresponding to the upper side. The base of the undersurface of the wing has orange-brown markings with black spots. The margin of the wing on the undersurface has black lines on an orange-brown background.

== Technical Description ==
A. cabira may be known by the hindmarginal spot on the upper side of the forewing completely covering the base of cellule 2 and reaching the cell in 1 b also; the light spot in 1 b is, however, proximally cut off obliquely and hence much narrower at vein 1 than at vein 2, so that the hindmarginal spot assumes a peculiar shape. The median band of the hind wing is widened in cellules 4 and 5 and on the under surface the hindwing has always broad red streaks in the cell and in cellule 8 and at the distal margin the whitish marginal spots are proximally prolonged into red, black-edged streaks and the veins bordered by grey lines. Forewing beneath reddish to yellow-brown in the cell and at the base of cellule 1 b-In the typeform cabira Hpff. the markings of the upper surface are light yellow and the hindmarginal spot of the forewing above is prolonged more or less basad along the hindmargin of the cell. In the figured specimen (56 c) this prolongation is so minute that the example belongs rather to natalensis. Congo to the Cape and Uganda. - f. apecida Oberth. (56 c) only differs in having the median band of the hindwing and the hindmarginal spot of the forewing more or less suffused with red; also the subapical band of the fore wing is occasionally reddish. Congo and Tanzania. - f. abrupta Grunb. agrees with apecida above, but differs beneath in the marginal band of the hindwing being almost uniform black without light and dark streaks and in the absence of the red spots between the basal dots. Sesse Islands. - natalensis Stgr. (56 c) only differs from the type-form in not having the hindmarginal spot on the upper side of the forewing prolonged towards the base but terminating at the origin of vein 2. Natal to Tanzania. - ab. biraca Suff, differs in having the hindmarginal spot on the upper side of the forewing prolonged in 1 b to the base.

== Distribution ==
It is found from the eastern subtropical forest areas of South Africa, through Eswatini, Zimbabwe, and to Uganda, the Congo and Kenya.

== Life cycle ==
=== Larvae ===
The larvae feed on Triumfetta (including T. tomentosa), Hemannia, Hibiscus and Cephalomma species. When young, they group together on a mass of silk that they spin on the food plant, but as they grow older they venture out alone to different parts of the food plant.

=== Pupae ===
The pupae have a whitish to yellowish background with two rows of yellow and black markings down the back, but the pupa becomes dark coloured close to hatching. The wing areas have fine black veining on a whitish to yellowish background, but the black and yellow wings show through the shell of the pupa near hatching.

=== Adults ===
Adults are on wing year round but are more common in warmer months. They have a slow, weak flight pattern and stay close to the ground, favouring sunny areas in forest clearings or on the edges of forest. The adults feed on nectar from flowers.

== Gallery ==
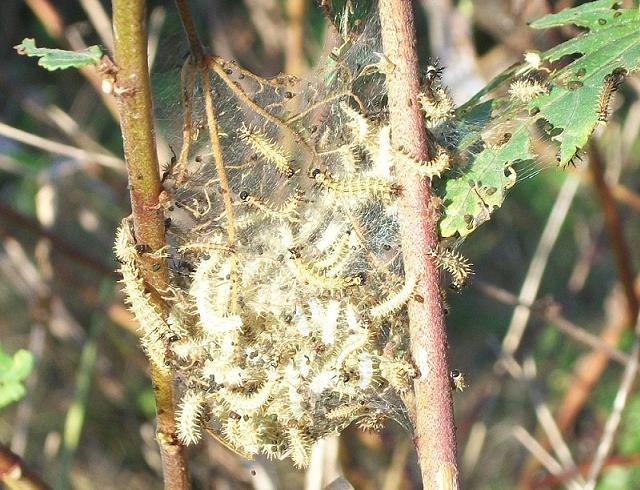
A mass of young larvae on the food plant

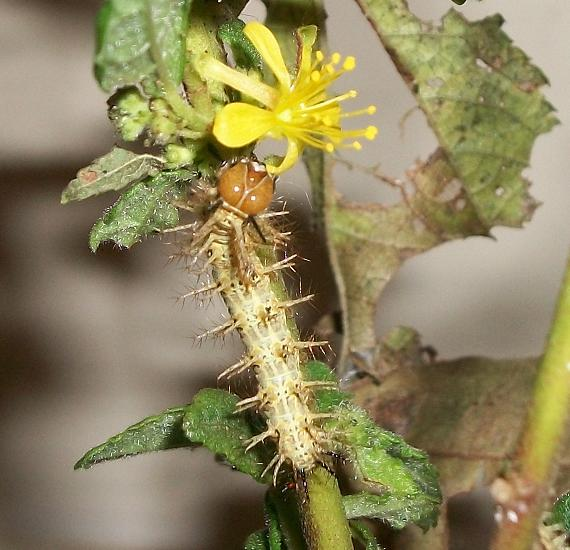
Larva eating flower of Triumfetta sp.

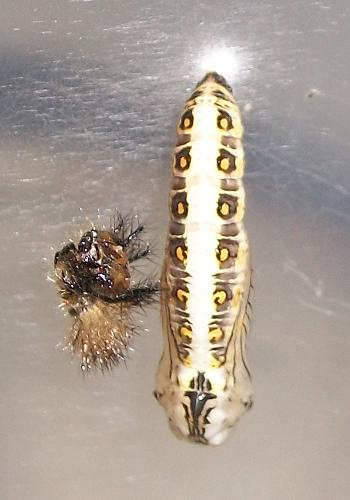
Pupa viewed from the back, with shed caterpillar skin on the left

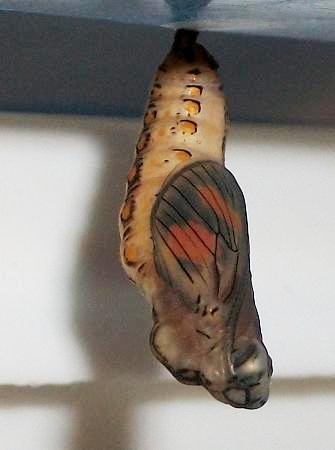
A female pupa viewed from the side, a few hours before hatching

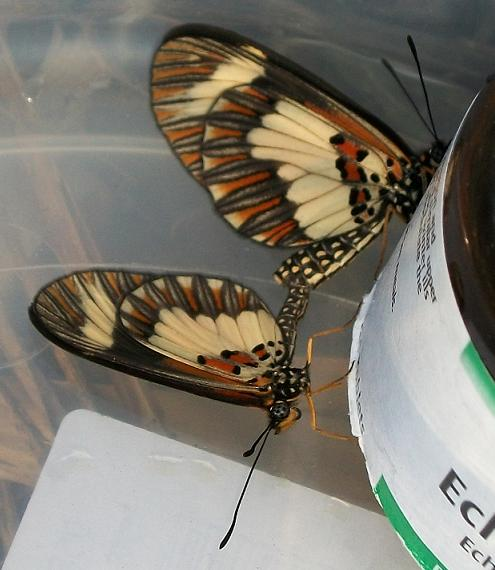
A pair mating in captivity (female at the top of the picture)

== Taxonomy ==
Acraea cabira is a member of the Acraea bonasia species group; see Acraea.

Classification of Acraea by Henning, Henning & Williams, Pierre. J. & Bernaud

- Hyalites (group bonasia) Henning, 1993
- Telchinia (Telchinia) Henning & Williams, 2010
- Acraea (Actinote) (subgroup bonasia) Pierre & Bernaud, 2013
- Acraea (Actinote) groupe serena sub group bonasia Pierre & Bernaud, 2014
