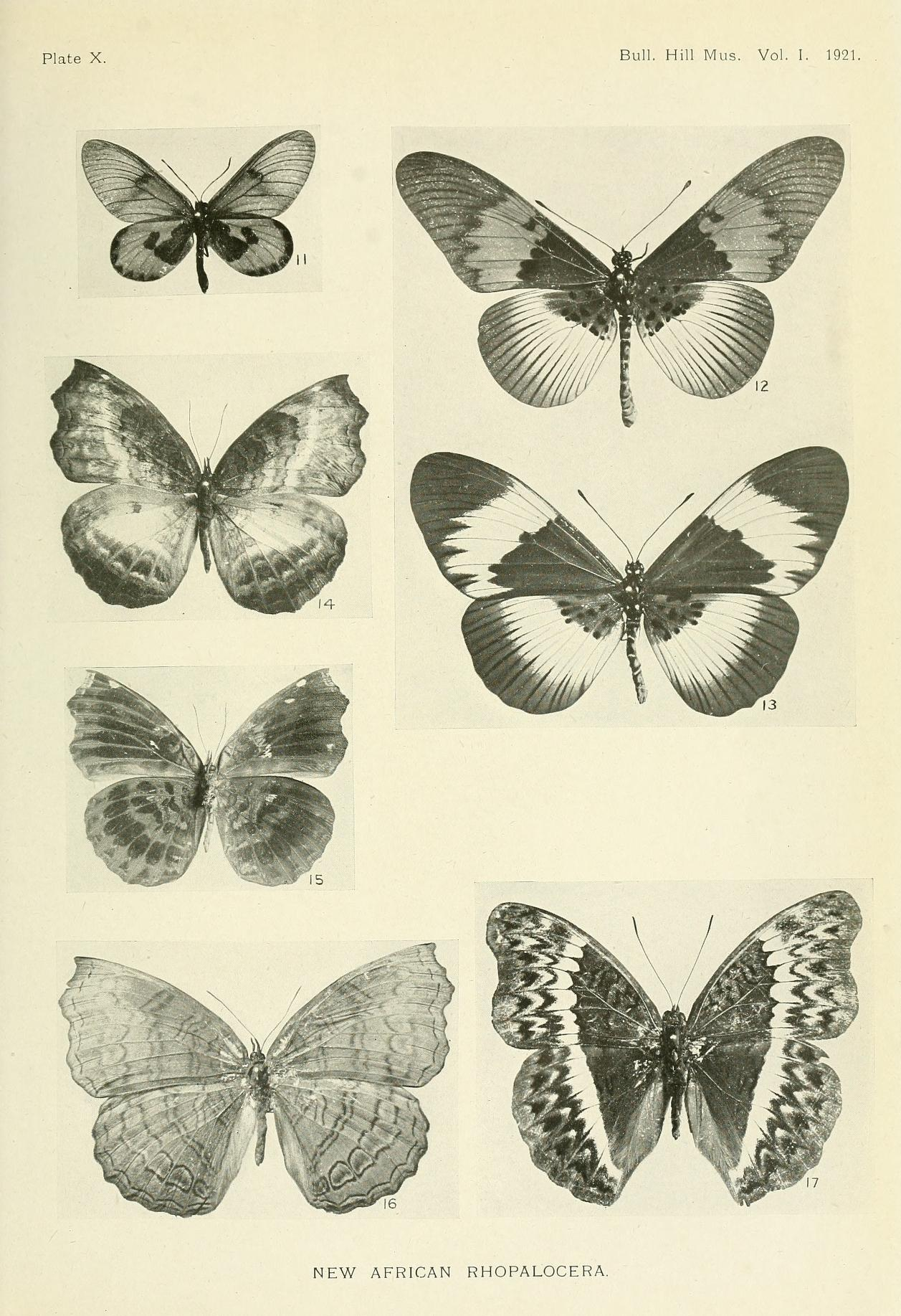

Scientific classification
- Kingdom: Animalia
- Phylum: Arthropoda
- Class: Insecta
- Order: Lepidoptera
- Family: Nymphalidae
- Genus: Acraea
- Species: A. eltringhami

Binomial name
- Acraea eltringhami Joicey & Talbot, 1921

Synonyms
- Acraea (Acraea) eltringhami; Acraea kisaba Carcasson, 1981

= Acraea eltringhami =

Species of butterfly

Acraea eltringhami is a butterfly in the family Nymphalidae. It is found in western Uganda, Rwanda, Burundi and the Democratic Republic of the Congo (from the eastern part of the country to Kivu).

== Taxonomy ==
It is a member of the Acraea terpsicore species group - but see also Pierre & Bernaud, 2014

== Etymology ==
The name honours the English entomologist Harry Eltringham.
