= Harpendyreus argenteostriata =

Scientific classification
- Domain: Eukaryota
- Kingdom: Animalia
- Phylum: Arthropoda
- Class: Insecta
- Order: Lepidoptera
- Family: Lycaenidae
- Genus: Harpendyreus
- Species: H. argenteostriata

Binomial name
- Harpendyreus argenteostriata Stempffer, 1961

Synonyms
- Harpendyreus collinsi Kielland, 1987

Species of butterfly

Harpendyreus argenteostriata is a butterfly in the family Lycaenidae. It is found in Kivu in the Democratic Republic of the Congo and in Rwanda.
