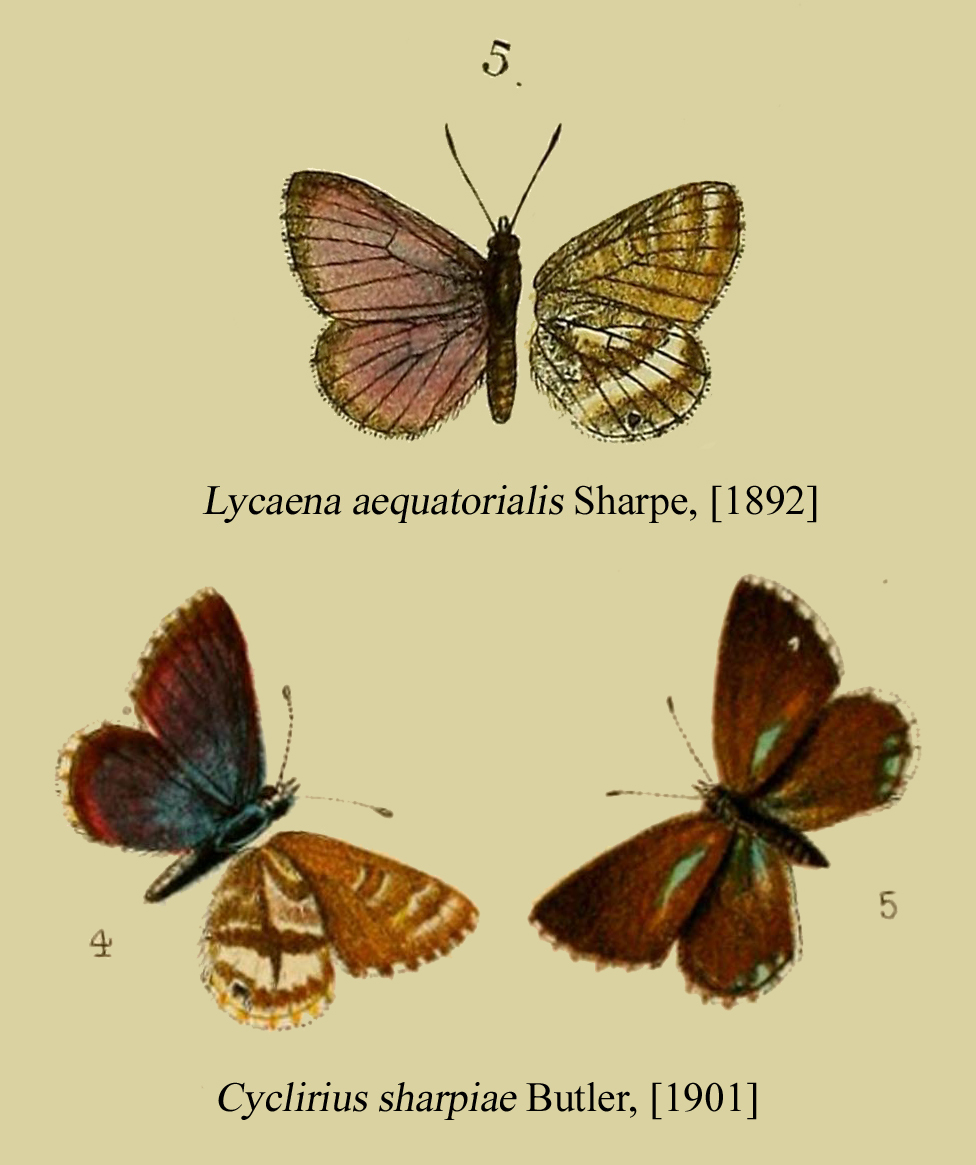

Scientific classification
- Domain: Eukaryota
- Kingdom: Animalia
- Phylum: Arthropoda
- Class: Insecta
- Order: Lepidoptera
- Family: Lycaenidae
- Genus: Harpendyreus
- Species: H. aequatorialis

Binomial name
- Harpendyreus aequatorialis (Sharpe, 1892)

Synonyms
- Lycaena aequatorialis Sharpe, 1892; Cyclyrius sharpiae Butler, 1901; Cyclirius vulcanica Joicey & Talbot, 1924

= Harpendyreus aequatorialis =

Species of butterfly

Harpendyreus aequatorialis, the equatorial mountain blue, is a butterfly in the family Lycaenidae. It is found in Kenya, Tanzania and the Democratic Republic of the Congo. The habitat consists of montane grassland and moorland.

== Subspecies ==
- Harpendyreus aequatorialis aequatorialis (Kenya)
- Harpendyreus aequatorialis vulcanica (Joicey & Talbot, 1924) (Tanzania: north to the highlands, Democratic Republic of the Congo: Ruwenzori Mountains)
