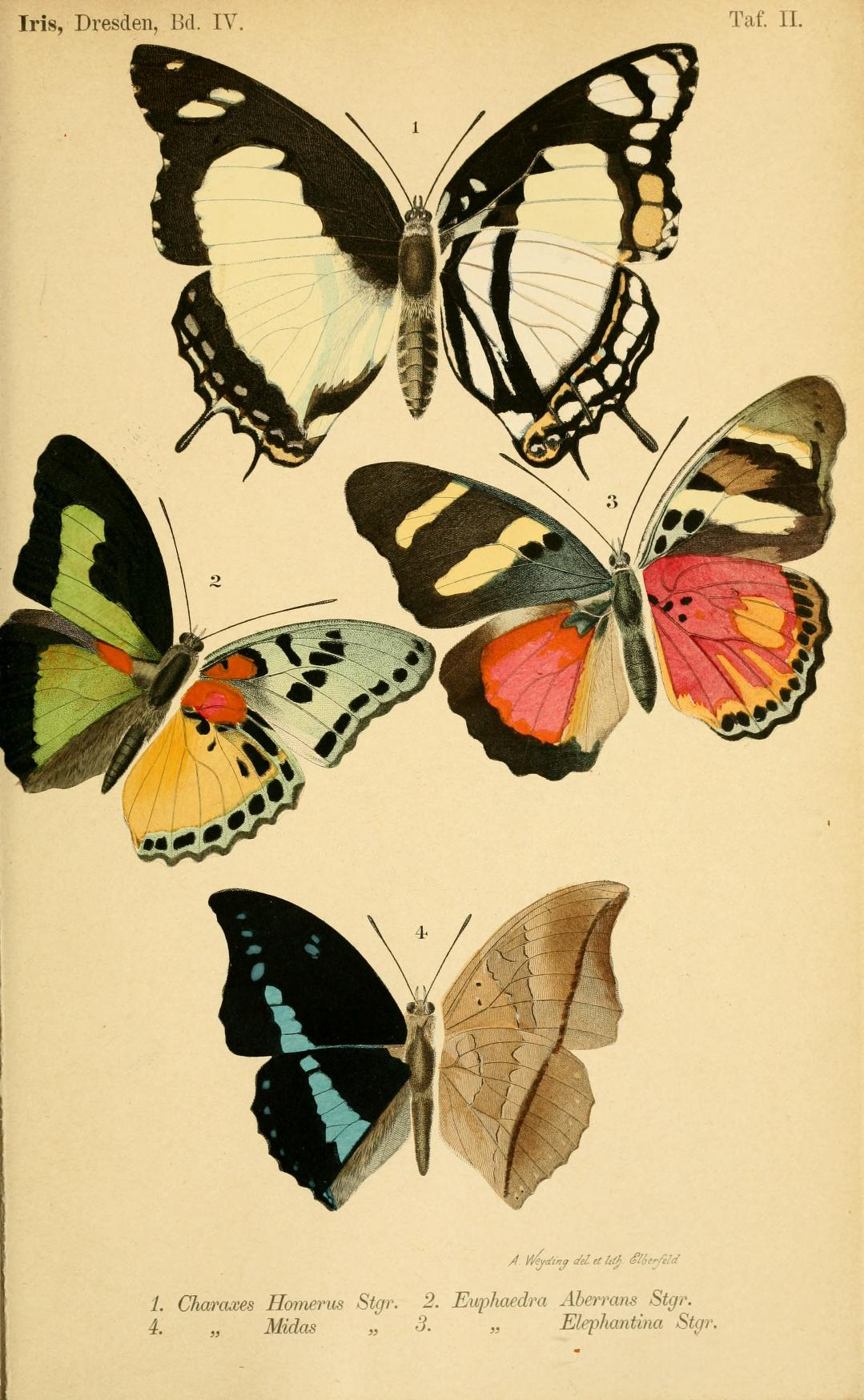

Scientific classification
- Kingdom: Animalia
- Phylum: Arthropoda
- Class: Insecta
- Order: Lepidoptera
- Family: Nymphalidae
- Genus: Euphaedra
- Species: E. zaddachii

Binomial name
- Euphaedra zaddachii Dewitz, 1879

Synonyms
- Euphaedra (Gausapia) zaddachii; Euphaedra crawshayi Butler, 1895; Euphaedra elephantina Staudinger, 1891

= Euphaedra zaddachii =

Species of butterfly

Euphaedra zaddachii, or Zaddach's mimic forester, is a butterfly in the family Nymphalidae. It is found in Nigeria, Cameroon, Gabon, the Republic of the Congo, the Central African Republic, Angola, the Democratic Republic of the Congo, Uganda, Rwanda, Burundi, Kenya, Tanzania, Malawi and Zambia.

== Description ==
E. zaddachi Dew. (44 c). Forewing black above, with slight greenish reflection and with no other markings but the two yellow, continuous transverse bands; marginal band of the hindwing above unspotted, beneath with 2 black submarginal spots in each cellule; cell of the forewing beneath greenish yellow with 3 black dots, that of the hindwing beneath with two dots, above unspotted; hindwing beneath more or less suffused with light yellow in the middle. Cameroons to Angola and German East Africa. - ab. Christyi E. Sharpe [ now species Euphaedra christyi ] only differs in having both surfaces of the hindwing ochre-yellow instead of red, only the underside red at the costal margin. Toro.

== Biology ==
The habitat consists of forests, including riparian forests and heavy woodland.

It is a mimic of day-flying moths.

The larvae feed on Parinari curatellifolia.

== Subspecies ==
- Euphaedra zaddachii zaddachii (southern Cameroon, Gabon, Angola, Democratic Republic of the Congo)
- Euphaedra zaddachii crawshayi Butler, 1895 (Democratic Republic of the Congo: Shaba, Uganda: Semuliki National Park, western Lake Victoria, south-eastern Rwanda, Burundi, Kenya, Tanzania, Malawi, northern Zambia)
- Euphaedra zaddachii elephantina Staudinger, 1891 (eastern Nigeria, western Cameroon, northern Congo, Central African Republic, Democratic Republic of the Congo: Moyen Congo)

== Similar species ==
Other members of the Euphaedra zaddachii species group q.v.
