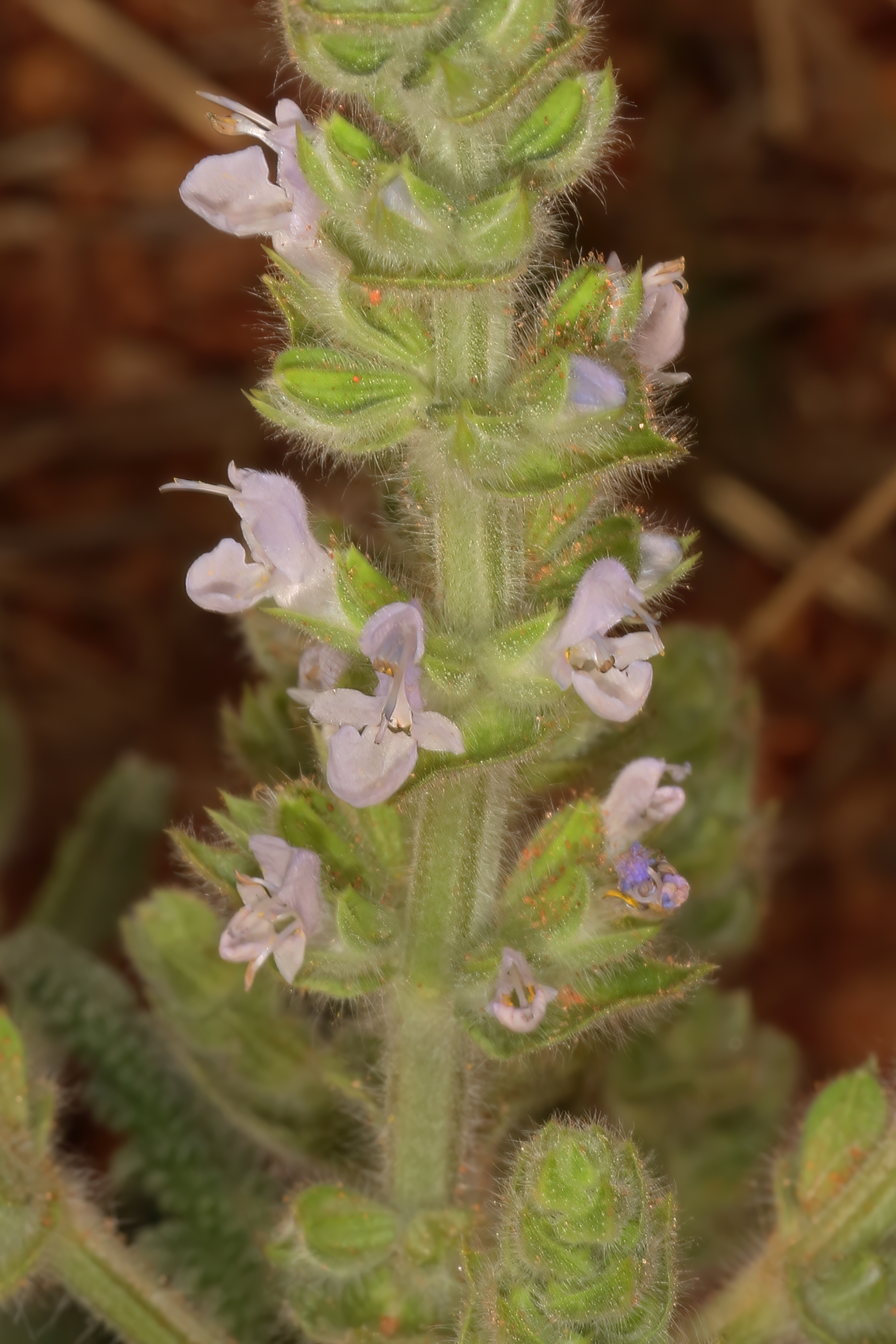

Conservation status
- Least Concern (SANBI Red List)

Scientific classification
- Kingdom: Plantae
- Clade: Tracheophytes
- Clade: Angiosperms
- Clade: Eudicots
- Clade: Asterids
- Order: Lamiales
- Family: Lamiaceae
- Genus: Salvia
- Species: S. radula

Binomial name
- Salvia radula Benth.

= Salvia radula =

Species of flowering plant

Salvia radula (African white sage) is a herbaceous perennial native to the northern provinces of South Africa, growing at elevations from 1,300 to 1,900 m (4,300 to 6,200 ft). The plant grows to 0.3 to 0.75 m (0.98 to 2.46 ft) tall. Leaves are wooly and white underneath. It is closely related to Salvia disermas.
