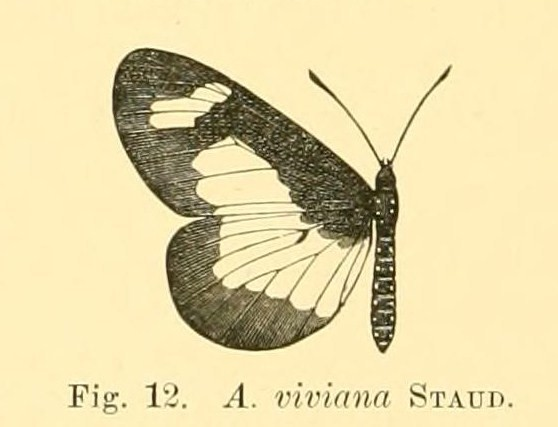
- In Per Olof Christopher Aurivillius's Rhopalocera Aethiopica

Scientific classification
- Kingdom: Animalia
- Phylum: Arthropoda
- Class: Insecta
- Order: Lepidoptera
- Family: Nymphalidae
- Genus: Acraea
- Species: A. viviana

Binomial name
- Acraea viviana Staudinger, 1896

Synonyms
- Acraea (Actinote) viviana

= Acraea viviana =

Species of butterfly

Acraea viviana, the straw-coloured acraea, is a butterfly in the family Nymphalidae. It is found in Nigeria, Cameroon, Angola, the north-eastern part of the Democratic Republic of the Congo, Uganda, western Kenya and north-western Tanzania.

== Description ==
A. viviana Stgr. (56 c) is similar above to the preceding species and has the same light yellow markings. The hindmarginal spot of the forewing is, however, much broader, completely covering the base of cellule 2, and the median band of the hindwing is 6-8 mm. in breadth and in cellules 4 and 5 distally widened; the hindmarginal spot of the forewing forms a small spot in the lower angle of the cell. The under surface differs in the smaller number of the black dots in the basal area of the hindwing; in the cell and in cellule 7 these are connected by red streaks. Cameroons to Uganda and Bukoba.

== Biology ==
The habitat consists of sub-montane forests at altitudes above 1,300 meters.

The larvae feed on Triumfetta rhomboidea.

== Taxonomy ==
See Pierre & Bernaud, 2014
