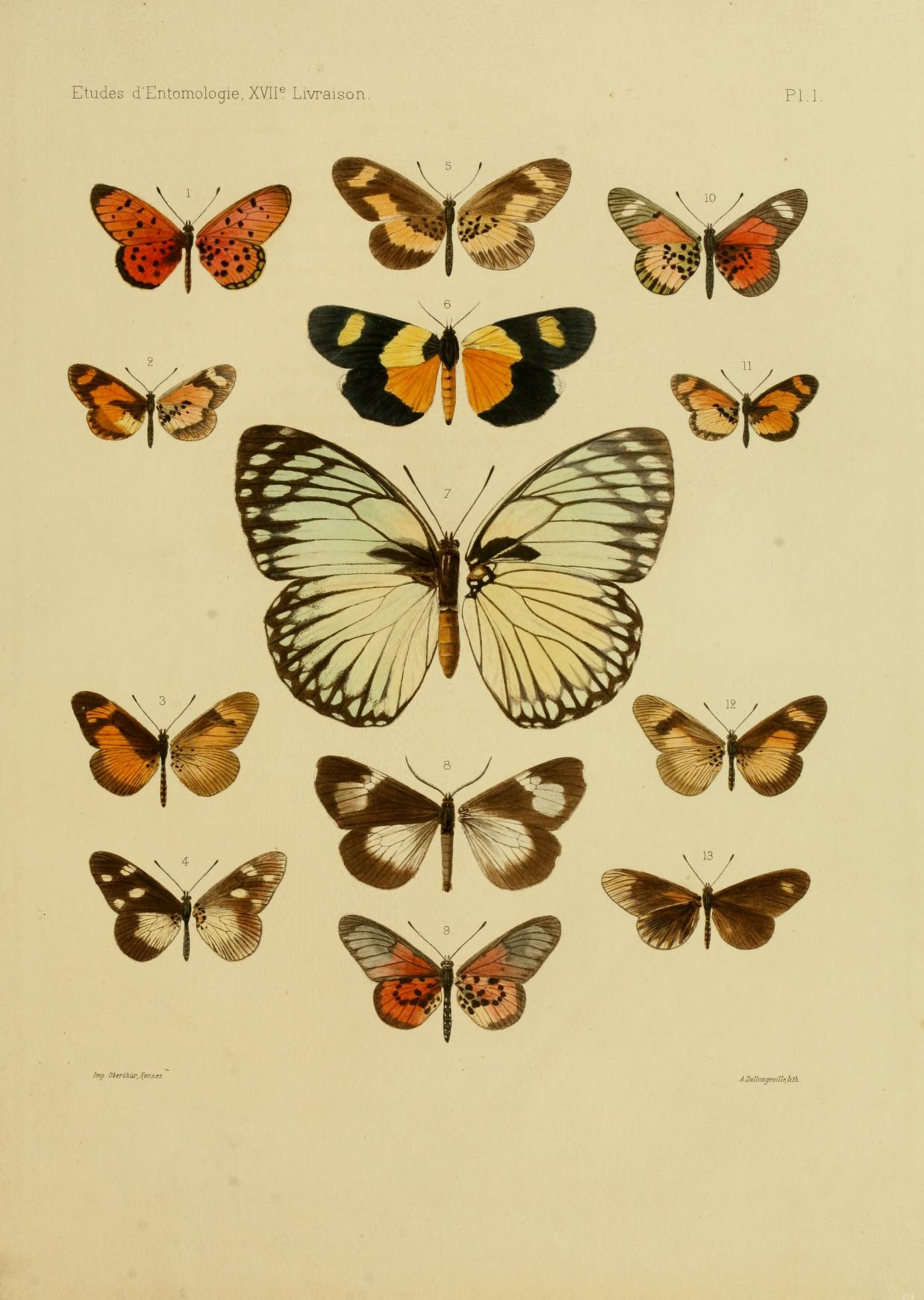
- Figures 2 and 11

Scientific classification
- Kingdom: Animalia
- Phylum: Arthropoda
- Class: Insecta
- Order: Lepidoptera
- Family: Nymphalidae
- Genus: Acraea
- Species: A. alicia

Binomial name
- Acraea alicia (Sharpe, 1890)

Synonyms
- Telchinia alicia Sharpe, 1890; Acraea (Actinote) alicia; Acraea cappadox Oberthür, 1893; Acraea planesium Oberthür, 1893; Acraea alicia f. cabiroides Poulton, 1908; Acraea alicia f. tenelloides Poulton, 1908; Acraea bonasia alicia ab. interruptana Strand, 1914; Acraea alicia ab. ornata Dufrane, 1945; Acraea alicia ab. suffusa Dufrane, 1945

= Acraea alicia =

Species of butterfly

Acraea alicia is a butterfly in the family Nymphalidae. It is found in the Democratic Republic of the Congo, Burundi, Uganda, Kenya, Tanzania, Malawi and Zambia.

== Description ==
A. alicia E. Sharpe (56 b). Markings of the upper surface yellow-red, only at the inner margin of the hindwing sulphur-yellow; the hindmarginal spot of the fore wing completely covers the base of cellule 2 and is continued on both sides of the median nearly to the base, covering the posterior half of the cell and the anterior part of cellule 1 b; hindwing above triangularly black at the base, in the female with light marginal spots. Hindwing beneath with light yellow ground-colour, at the base with black dots but without red spots or streaks; its marginal band deep black without light stripes and with no spots except the white marginal ones. Cameroons; Ruwenzori; Uganda; British East Africa; Kilimandjaro. - female ab. tenelloides Poult Subapical band of the forewing yellow; median band of the hind wing very broad and light yellow, the base but little black; marginal band on the underside of the hindwing light grey-yellow. British East Africa: Kikuyu. -female ab. cabiroides Poult. Above similar to the male but with marginal spots on the hindwing; hindwing beneath with broader marginal band in which the marginal spots are bounded by distinct black, proximally elongated lines. British East Africa: Kikuyu.

== Subspecies ==
- Acraea alicia alicia (Democratic Republic of the Congo, Burundi, Uganda, Kenya, northern Tanzania, Malawi, Zambia)
- Acraea alicia mbulu Kielland, 1990 (Tanzania: northern highlands)
- Acraea alicia uzungwae Kielland, 1990 (Tanzania: southern highlands)

== Biology ==
The habitat consists of montane forests and farmland.

== Taxonomy ==
Acraea alicia is a member of the Acraea bonasia species group; see Acraea.

Classification of Acraea by Henning, Henning & Williams, Pierre. J. & Bernaud

- Hyalites (group bonasia) Henning, 1993
- Acraea (Actinote) (subgroup bonasia) Pierre & Bernaud, 2013
- Telchinia (Telchinia) Henning & Williams, 2010
- Acraea (Actonote) groupe serena sub group bonasia Pierre & Bernaud, 2014
