= Francis Arthur Heron =

English entomologist

Francis Arthur Heron (1864–1940) was an English entomologist who specialised in African, Neotropical and Oriental butterflies.

Heron was appointed 2nd class assistant curator in the department of zoology at the British Museum (Natural History) in 1889. He retired due to ill health in 1910.

He was a fellow of the Royal Entomological Society of London.

== Works ==
partial list

- with George Francis Hampson, 1904 On the Lepidoptera collected at Chapada, Matto Grosso, by Mr. A. Robert (Percy Sladen Expedition to Central Brazil) Proceedings of the Zoological Society of London 1903(2):258-260
- with Hampson, G. F., 1904 Proceedings of the Zoological Society of London On the Lepidoptera collected at Chapada, Matto Grosso, by Mr. A. Robert (Percy Sladen Expedition to Central Brazil). 1903(II)(2):258-260
- Heron, F.A., 1909 Zoological results of the Ruwenzori Expedition 1905–1906. Ruwenzori Expedition Reports 12. Lepidoptera Rhopalocera. Transactions of the Zoological Society of London 19:141-178.
