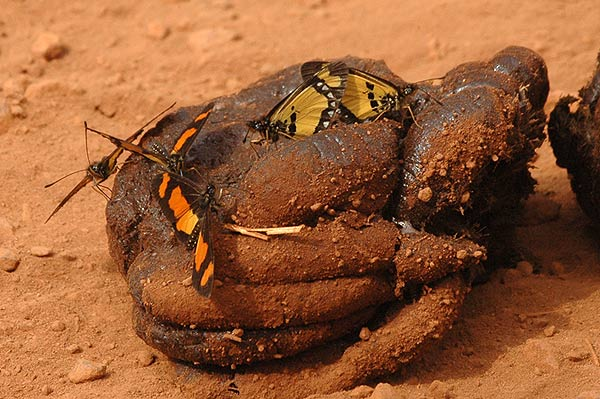

Scientific classification
- Kingdom: Animalia
- Phylum: Arthropoda
- Class: Insecta
- Order: Lepidoptera
- Family: Nymphalidae
- Genus: Acraea
- Species: A. uvui

Binomial name
- Acraea uvui Grose-Smith, 1890

Synonyms
- Acraea (Actinote) uvui; Acraea minima Holland, 1892; Acraea uvui ab. interruptella Strand, 1909; Acraea uvui f. subsuffusa Stoneham, 1936; Acraea balina Karsch, 1892

= Acraea uvui =

Species of butterfly

Acraea uvui, the tiny acraea or tiny mountain acraea, is a butterfly of the family Nymphalidae. It is found in Cameroon, Angola, northern Tanzania, Kenya, Rwanda, Uganda, Burundi and eastern Zaire. The habitat consists of sub-montane forests at altitudes ranging from 1,200 to 1,400 meters.

Adult males mud-puddle and are also attracted to urine and animal excrement.

The larvae feed on Triumfetta species (including T. rhomboidea and T. macrophylla) and Sparmannia ricinocarpa.

== Subspecies ==
- Acraea uvui uvui (Democratic Republic of the Congo: east to Ituri and Kivu, Uganda, Rwanda, Burundi, Kenya, northern Tanzania)
- Acraea uvui balina Karsch, 1892 (Nigeria, Cameroon, highlands of Angola)

== Description ==
Wingspan 30–34 mm. Forewing black. A subapical patch of tawny red narrow in 10, 9, and 6, and widened to about double the width in 5 and 4. A central inner marginal patch of the same colour occupying the central part of la and lb, rather more than the basal half of 2, extending slightly into 3 at its base, and into lower part of distal end of cell. Hindwing with a black triangular basal patch, central area tawny red often inclining to yellow at inner margin, somewhat indenting the basal patch at upperside of cell. Hind margin with a black border about 2 mm wide, its inner edge deeply indented by the red colour in 4 and 5, above this point somewhat convex, and below running horizontally across to inner margin. Underside very like that of bonasia alicia Forewing. Basal half pale reddish yellow with dusky indications of the basal black of upperside. The subapical patch ochre yellow, its proximal edge straight or even concave. Remainder of wing brownish black. Hindwing ochre yellow with a greenish tinge at base. Some irregular black at base of wing and a small basal spot in cell. At about the level of middle of cell a transverse band of irregular confluent black spots usually divisible into five rather large subquadrate marks in 7, cell, 1c, lb, and la. Hind marginal border as on upperside though occasionally slightly narrower. A marginal series of small white subtriangular spots.

Head and thorax black with two brownish tufts on collar. Abdomen black with very minute pale lateral spots and segmental lines. Claws unequal.

== Description in Seitz ==
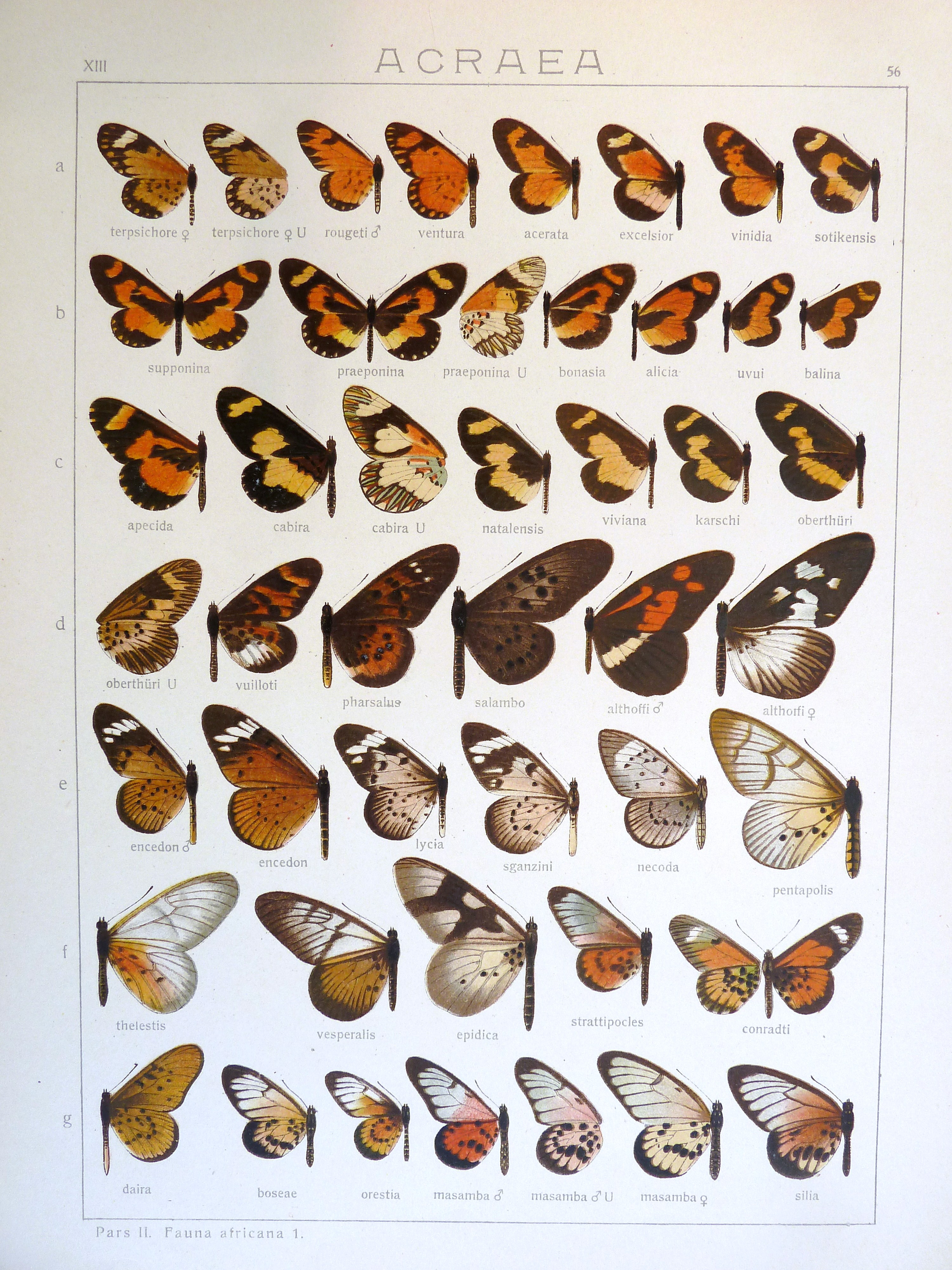
Seitz Fauna AfricanaTaf 56

A. uvui Sm. (56 b) is a small species and may be known by having the markings of the upper surface yellow-red (only at the inner margin of the hindwing light yellow) and the proximal edge of the hindmarginal spot of the fore wing straight and sharply defined; it covers the base of cellule 2 and also forms a small spot in 3 and in the apex of the cell. In the type-form the hindwing has on the underside no red streaks between the basal dots and no light stripes in the black marginal band; the subapical band of the fore wing is nearly straight. German and British East Africa; Uganda. - balina Karsch (56 b). Spots 4 and 5 of the subapical band of the forewing are elongate and the band consequently almost angled at vein 6; the hind- wing beneath with 1 or 2 red streaks or spots between the black dots in the cell and in cellule 8 and at least with indications of light streaks in the marginal band. Cameroons and Angola. - interruptella Strand is an intermediate form and is characterized by having the large black dots near the base of the hindwing beneath free and in cellule 8 absent and by the marginal band having yellow or reddish spots at the proximal end of the light marginal spots. German East Africa.

== Taxonomy ==
Acraea uvui is a member of the Acraea bonasia species group; see Acraea. See also Pierre & Bernaud, 2014
