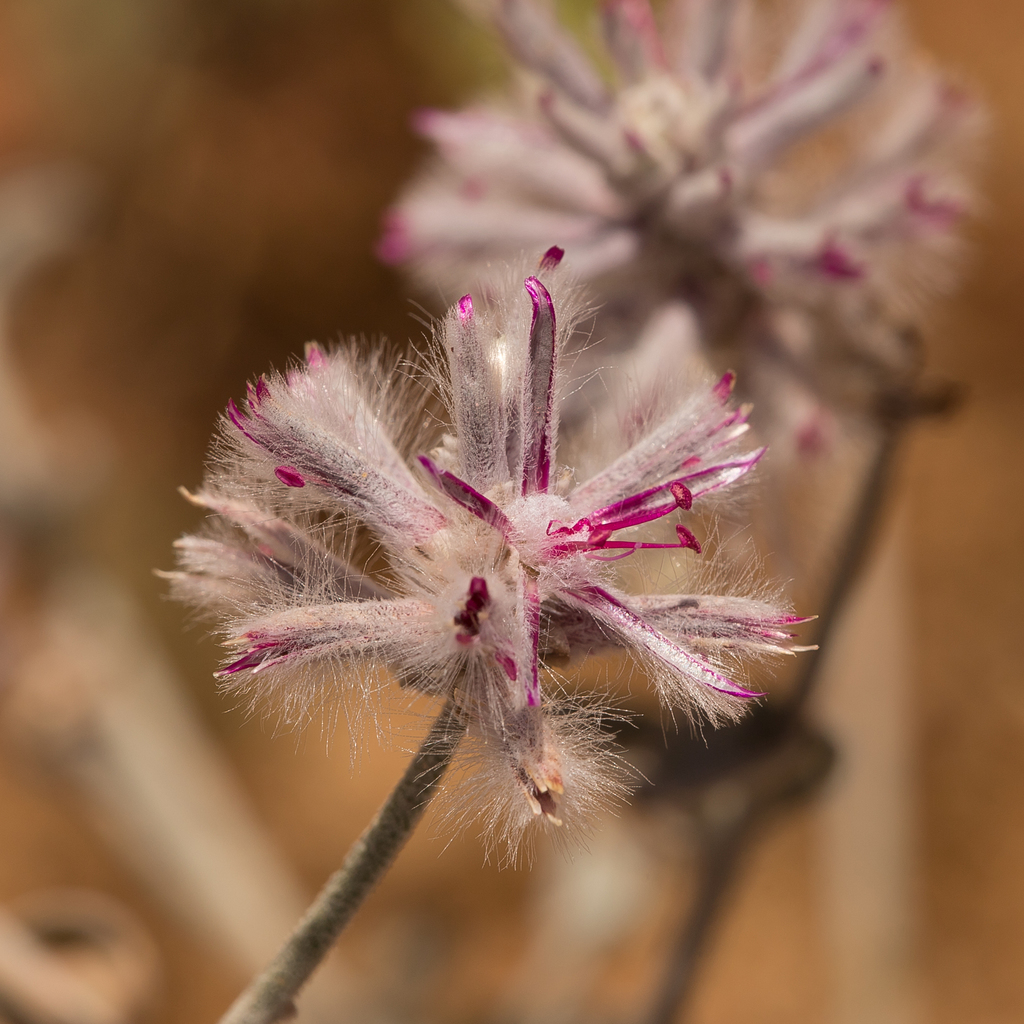
- Near Wilcannia

Scientific classification
- Kingdom: Plantae
- Clade: Embryophytes
- Clade: Tracheophytes
- Clade: Spermatophytes
- Clade: Angiosperms
- Clade: Eudicots
- Order: Caryophyllales
- Family: Amaranthaceae
- Genus: Ptilotus
- Species: P. sessilifolius

Binomial name
- Ptilotus sessilifolius (Lindl.) Benl

Synonyms
- List: Trichinium sessilifolium Lindl.; Ptilotus sessilifolius (Lindl.) Benl var. sessilifolius; Trichinium obovatum var. grandiflorum Benth.; Trichinium elderi Farmar; Ptilotus incanus var. intermedius Ewart & Jean White nom. inval.; Trichinium incanum var. intermedium Ewart & Jean White; Ptilotus obovatus var. grandiflorum Ewart & O.B.Davies orth. var.; Ptilotus obovatus var. grandiflorus Ewart & O.B.Davies; Trichinium incanum var. grandiflorum (Benth.) Benth. ex J.M.Black; Ptilotus oblongifolius Gand.; Trichinium obovatum var. atriplicifolium (A.Cunn. ex Moq.) Domin; Ptilotus atriplicifolius (A.Cunn. ex Moq.) Benl; Ptilotus atriplicifolius var. elderi (Farmar) Benl; Ptilotus atriplicifolius (A.Cunn. ex Moq.) Benl var. atriplicifolius; Ptilotus sessilifolius var. elderi (Farmar) Benl; Trichinium atriplicifolium A.Cunn. ex Moq. p.p.

= Ptilotus sessilifolius =

Species of herb

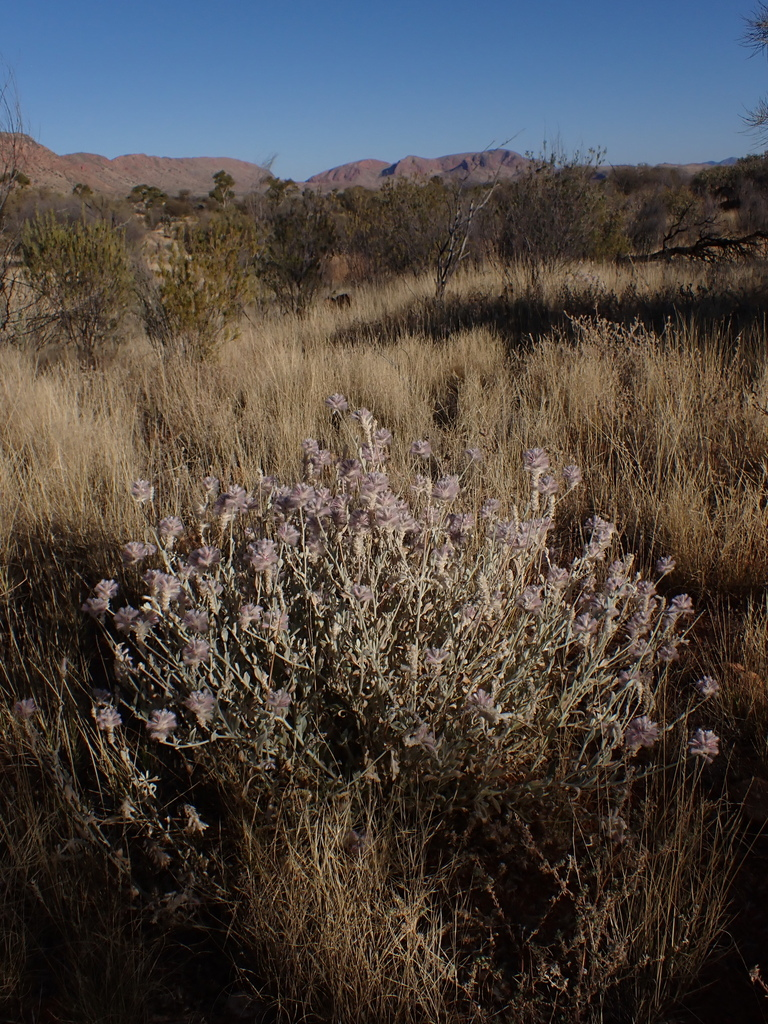
Habit in West MacDonnell National Park

Ptilotus sessilifolius, commonly known as silver-tails or crimson foxtail, is a flowering plant in the Amaranthaceae family and is endemic to mostly inland areas of continental Australia. It is an erect, shrubby perennial plant with densely hairy stems, egg-shaped leaves with the narrower end towards the base, and spherical or oval spikes of pinkish flowers.

== Description ==
Ptilotus sessilifolius is a shrubby perennial herb or shrub that typically grows to a height of up to 50 cm (20 in) and has stems densely covered with woolly hairs. The leaves are egg-shaped with the narrower end towards the base, 10–50 mm (0.39–1.97 in) wide and up to 40 mm (1.6 in) wide, the leaves at the base petiolate, the stem leaves only sparingly so. The flowers are pinkish and arranged in spherical or oval heads up to 30 mm (1.2 in) in diameter. The bracts are egg-shaped or round, 3–4 mm (0.12–0.16 in) long and the bracteoles broadly elliptic, 1–2 mm (0.039–0.079 in) longer than the bracts. The tepals are fused at the base for about 1.5 mm (0.059 in), the outer surface with long, silky hairs. There are three fertile stamens and two staminodes, the ovary is glabrous and has a short stalk. Flowering mainly occurs from October to March and the fruit is 2.0–3.5 mm (0.079–0.138 in) long and 1.5–2.5 mm (0.059–0.098 in) wide.

== Taxonomy ==
This species was first formally described in 1838 by John Lindley who gave it the name Trichinium sessilifolium in Thomas Mitchell's Three Expeditions into the interior of Eastern Australia. In 1990, Gerhard Benl transferred the species to Ptilotus as P. sessilifolium in the journal Mitteilungen der Botanischen Staatssammlung Munchen. The specific epithet (sessilifolius) means 'sessile-leaved'.

== Distribution and habitat ==
Silver-tails occurs in every mainland state of mainland Australia, and in the Northern Territory. It grows on ranges, hills, rises and on dunefields, sometimes near intermittent watercourses in Western Australia the Northern Territory, South Australia, Queensland, New South Wales and Victoria.
