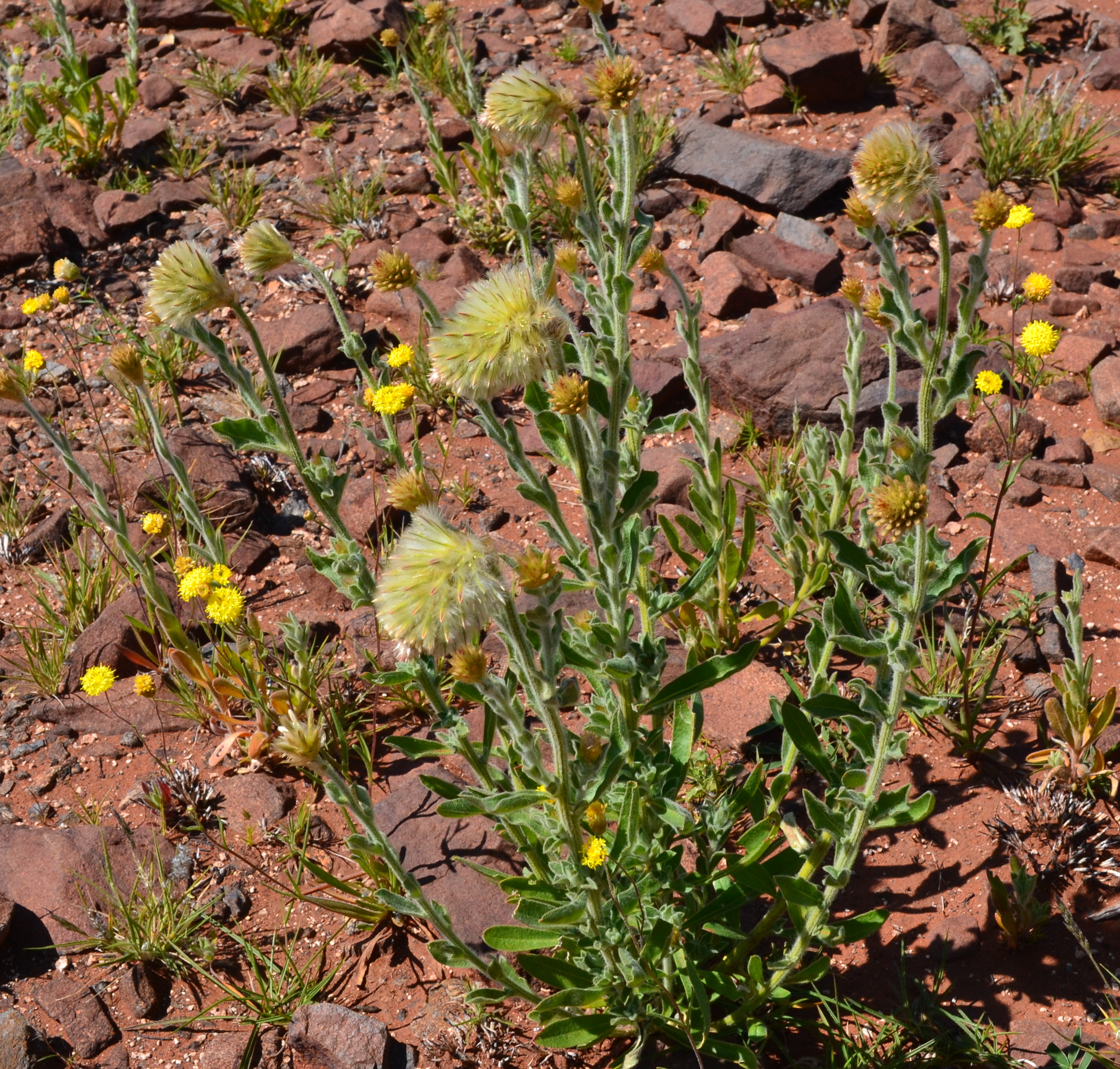
- Near Papulankutja

Scientific classification
- Kingdom: Plantae
- Clade: Tracheophytes
- Clade: Angiosperms
- Clade: Eudicots
- Order: Caryophyllales
- Family: Amaranthaceae
- Genus: Ptilotus
- Species: P. clementii

Binomial name
- Ptilotus clementii (Farmar) Benl

Synonyms
- Ptilotus pearsonii C.T.White; Trichinium clementi Farmar orth. var.; Trichinium clementii Farmar

= Ptilotus clementii =

Species of herb

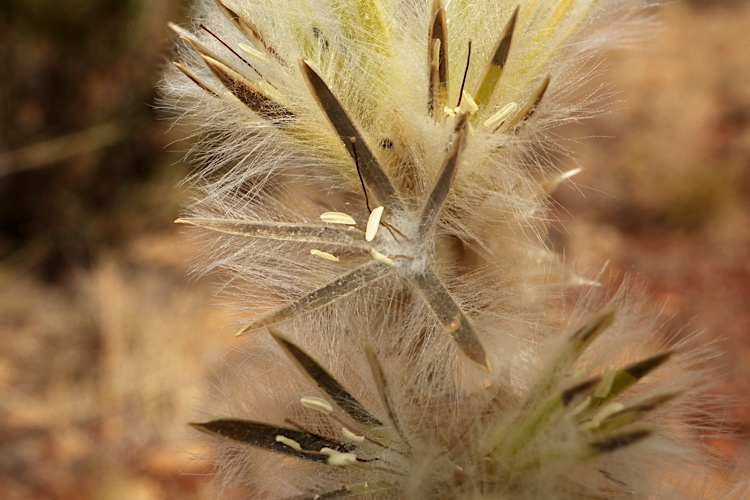
Flower detail

Ptilotus clementii, commonly known as tassel top, is a species of flowering plant in the family Amaranthaceae and is endemic to northern Australia. It is an erect to spreading annual herb, with hairy stems and leaves, and oval or cylindrical spikes of green flowers with five stamens.

== Description ==
Ptilotus clementii is an erect, compact shrub that typically grows up to 0.3–1 m (1 ft 0 in – 3 ft 3 in) high, and has hairy stems and leaves. The leaves are lance-shaped to elliptic, 15–60 mm (0.59–2.36 in) long and 4–13 mm (0.16–0.51 in) wide. The flowers are green, borne in oval to cylindrical heads 30–80 mm (1.2–3.1 in) long and 35–53 mm (1.4–2.1 in) wide. There are bracts 7.5–10.5 mm (0.30–0.41 in) long with a prominent midrib, and similar bracteoles 6.6–10 mm (0.26–0.39 in) long, at the base of the flowers. The outer tepals are 18–23 mm (0.71–0.91 in) long and the inner tepals 17–22 mm (0.67–0.87 in) long and glabrous on the inner surface. There are five stamens and the style is sometimes S-shaped, 11.6–18 mm (0.46–0.71 in) long. Flowering occurs from March to November and the fruit is 2–4 mm (0.079–0.157 in) long and 1–2 mm (0.039–0.079 in) wide.

== Taxonomy ==
This species was first formally described in 1905 by Leo Farmar, who gave it the name Trichinium clementii in the Bulletin de l'Herbier Boissier, from specimens collected by Emile Clement between the Ashburton and De Grey Rivers in north-western Australia. In 1958, Gerhard Benl transferred the species to Prilotus as P. clementii in Mitteilungen der Botanischen Staatssammlung Munchen. The specific epithet (clementii) honours the collector of the type specimens.

== Distribution and habitat ==
Tassel top is found on rocky hills, limestone ridges and plains in the Carnarvon, Central Ranges, Dampierland, Gascoyne, Gibson Desert, Great Sandy Desert, Great Victoria Desert, Little Sandy Desert, Ord Victoria Plain, Pilbara and Tanami bioregions of Western Australia, the Burt Plain, Central Ranges, Channel Country, Davenport Murchison Ranges, Finke, Gibson Desert, Great Sandy Desert, Gulf Fall and Uplands, Gulf Plains, Little Sandy Desert, MacDonnell Ranges Mitchell Grass Downs, Mount Isa Inlier, Ord Victoria Plain, Pilbara, Simpson Strzelecki Dunefields and Tanami bioregions of the Northern Territory, and the Mount Isa-Cloncurry area of north-west Queensland.

== Conservation status ==
Ptilotus clementii is listed as "not threatened" by the Government of Western Australia Department of Biodiversity, Conservation and Attractions, and as of "least concern" under the Northern Territory Parks and Wildlife Conservation Act and the Queensland Government Nature Conservation Act 1992.

== See also ==
- List of Ptilotus species
