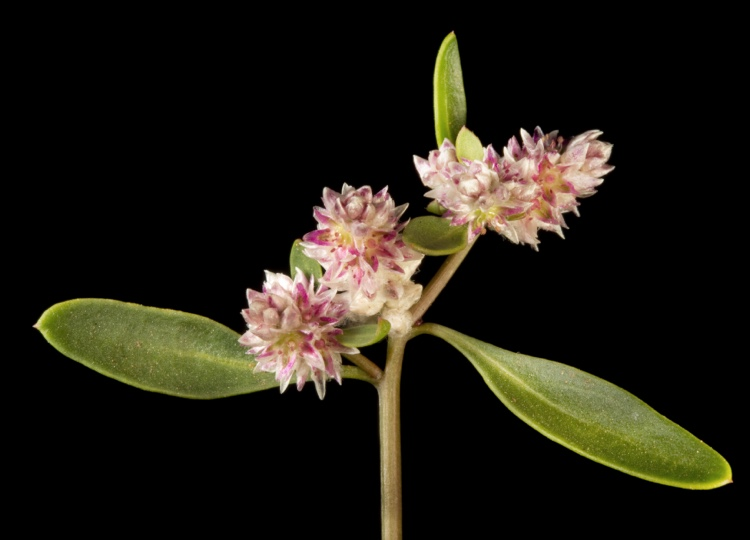
- Near the Gascoyne River Middle Branch

Scientific classification
- Kingdom: Plantae
- Clade: Tracheophytes
- Clade: Angiosperms
- Clade: Eudicots
- Order: Caryophyllales
- Family: Amaranthaceae
- Genus: Ptilotus
- Species: P. gomphrenoides

Binomial name
- Ptilotus gomphrenoides F.Muell. ex Benth.

Synonyms
- Ptilotus gomphrenoides F.Muell. nom. inval., nom. nud.; Ptilotus gomphrenoides var. conglomeratus (Farmar) Benl; Ptilotus gomphrenoides var. roseo-albus (Farmar) Benl; Ptilotus roseo-albus var. conglomeratus Farmar; Ptilotus roseo-albus Farmar var. roseo-albus

= Ptilotus gomphrenoides =

Species of grass-like plant

Ptilotus gomphrenoides is a species of flowering plant in the family Amaranthaceae and is endemic to Western Australia. It is an erect, low-lying or rarely prostrate annual herb, with narrowly lance-shaped to broadly lance-shaped stem leaves, flowers arranged singly or in clusters, rarely in cylindrical spikes of pink flowers.

== Description ==
Ptilotus gomphrenoides is an erect, sometimes low-lying or rarely prostrate annual herb, that typically grows to a height of up to 10–30 cm (3.9–11.8 in), its stems ribbed and glabrous or with a sparse covering of simple hairs. The leaves on the stems are arranged alternately, narrowly to broadly lance-shaped, 5–30 mm (0.20–1.18 in) long and 1–5 mm (0.039–0.197 in) wide. The flowers pinkish white and arranged singly or in clusters in leaf axils or on the ends of stems on a peduncle 1–10 mm (0.039–0.394 in) long, or rarely in cylindrical spikes 4–20 mm (0.16–0.79 in) long and 6–7 mm (0.24–0.28 in) wide, with egg-shaped, translucent bracts 1.1–1.4 mm (0.043–0.055 in) long, and egg-shaped, glabrous bracteoles 1.2–1.5 mm (0.047–0.059 in) long. The outer sepals are narrowly lance-shaped, 2–3 mm (0.079–0.118 in) long and the inner sepals are 1.8–2.5 mm (0.071–0.098 in) long. There are 5 fertile stamens, the style is straight, 0.2–0.4 mm (0.0079–0.0157 in) long and fixed to the centre of the ovary. Flowering occurs from April to September.

== Taxonomy ==
Ptilotus gomphrenoides was first formally described in 1870 by George Bentham in his Flora Australiensis, from an unpublished description by Ferdinand von Mueller. The specific epithet (gomphrenoides) means 'Gomphrena-like'.

== Distribution and habitat ==
This species of Ptilotus usually grows on flat, seasonally inundated floodplains, riverbanks or creek lines in red or brown soils in the Carnarvon, Gascoyne, Gibson Desert, Murchison, Pilbara and Tanami bioregions of Western Australia.

== Conservation status ==
Ptilotus gomphrenoides is listed as "not threatened" by the Government of Western Australia Department of Biodiversity, Conservation and Attractions.

== See also ==
- List of Ptilotus species
