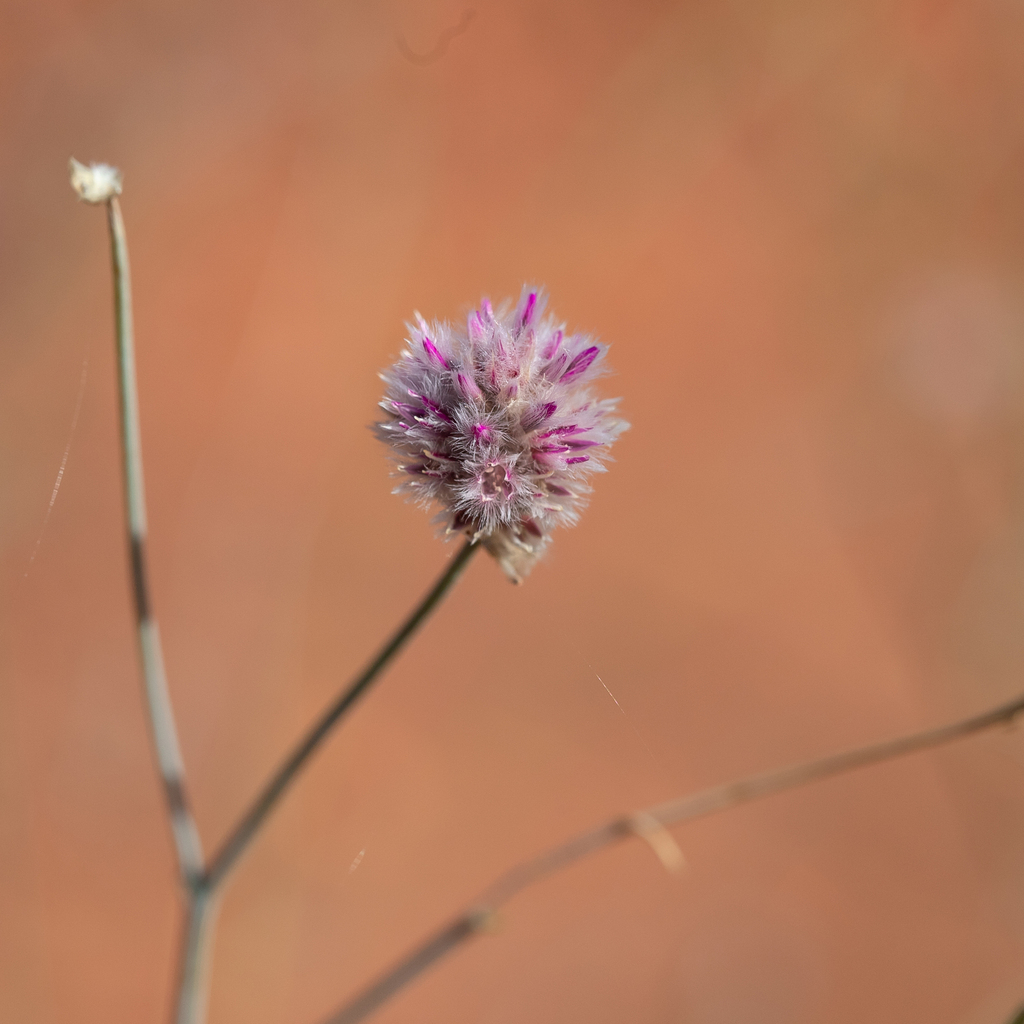
- South of Winton

Scientific classification
- Kingdom: Plantae
- Clade: Embryophytes
- Clade: Tracheophytes
- Clade: Spermatophytes
- Clade: Angiosperms
- Clade: Eudicots
- Order: Caryophyllales
- Family: Amaranthaceae
- Genus: Ptilotus
- Species: P. schwartzii

Binomial name
- Ptilotus schwartzii (F.Muell.) Tate

Synonyms
- Ptilotus fraseri var. schwartzii F.Muell. Ptilotus schwartzii f. elongatus Benl; Ptilotus schwartzii (F.Muell.) Tate f. schwartzii Trichinium fraseri var. schwartzii J.M.Black nom. inval., pro syn. Trichinium schwartzii (F.Muell.) Farmar

= Ptilotus schwartzii =

Species of herb

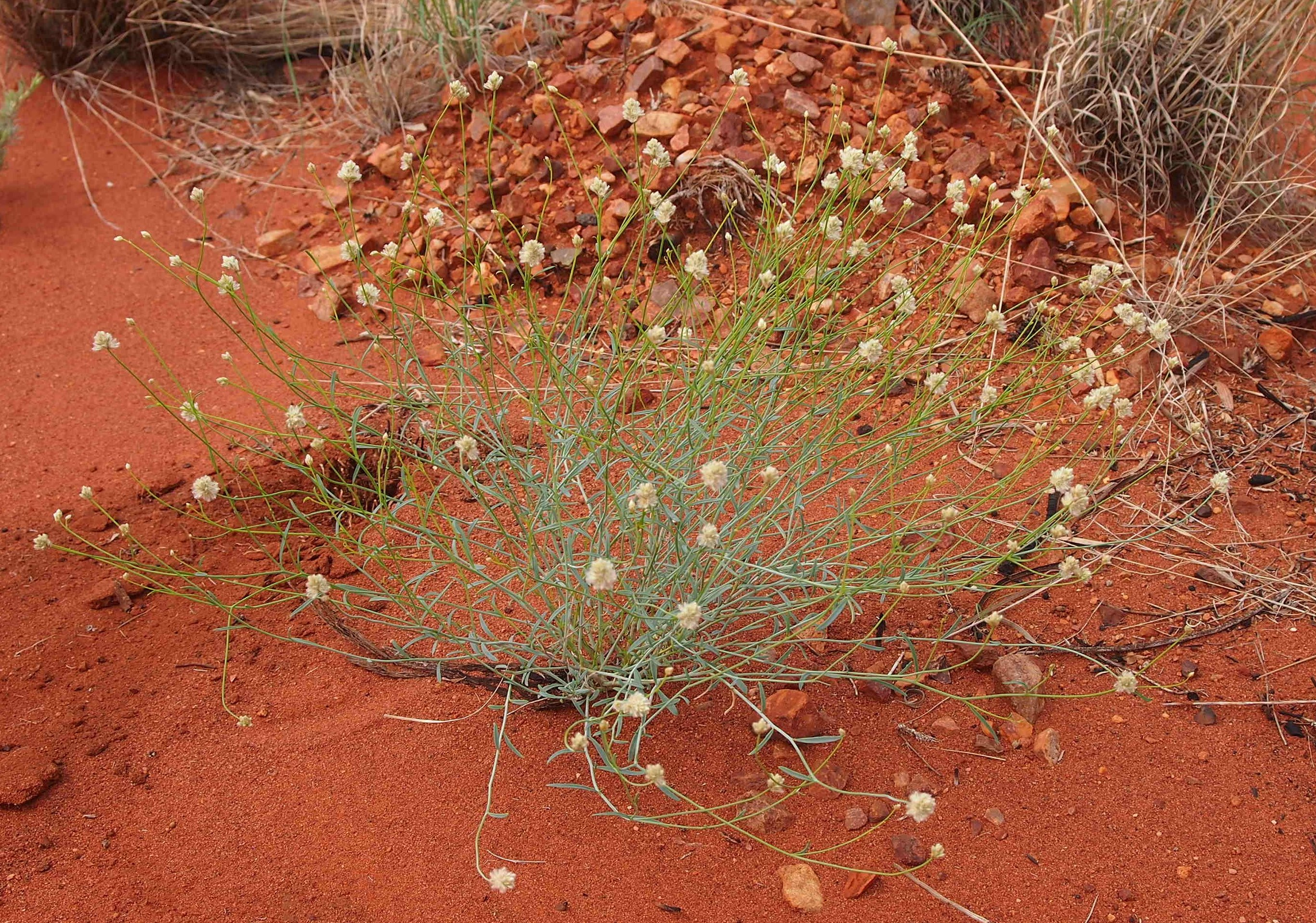
Habit

Ptilotus schwartzii, commonly known as horse mulla mulla, is an erect, perennial herb or shrub in the Amaranthaceae family and is endemic to mostly inland areas of Australia. It usually has several more or less erect, glabrous stems, glabrous stem leaves and pink spikes of densely arranged flowers.

== Description ==
Ptilotus schwartzii is perennial herb or shrub that typically grows to a height of 0.2–1 m (7.9 in – 3 ft 3.4 in) and has slender, glaucous irregularly spreading stems. The leaves are scattered along the stems, glabrous, sometimes glaucous, linear to narrowly elliptic, 8–25 mm (0.31–0.98 in) long and 0.8–1 mm (0.031–0.039 in) wide, and sometimes leafless. The flowers are densely arranged in pink, oval, narrowly cylindrical or hemispherical spikes up to 40 mm (1.6 in) long with up to 25 flowers. The bracts are 2.5–4.2 mm (0.098–0.165 in) long and the bracteoles 2.4–4.3 mm (0.094–0.169 in) long. The perianth is 5–7 mm (0.20–0.28 in) long, white or grey and tinged with pink or purple, the outer tepals 7.6–8.1 mm (0.30–0.32 in) long, the inner tepals 7.1–7.9 mm (0.28–0.31 in) long. The style is straight, 2.5–3.0 mm (0.098–0.118 in) long and fixed to the centre of the ovary. Flowering occurs from March to October and the seeds are glossy brown, 1.4–1.5 mm (0.055–0.059 in) long.

== Taxonomy ==
This species was first formally described in 1888 by Ferdinand von Mueller who gave it the name Ptilotus fraseri var. schwartzii, in the Proceedings of the Linnean Society of New South Wales, from a specimen collected near the MacDonnell Ranges by the "Reverend Mr Schwartz". In 1889, Ralph Tate raised the subspecies to species rank with the name Ptilotus schwartzii.

== Distribution and habitat ==
Horse mulla mulla is widespread in Western Australia, South Australia, the Northern Territory, and Queensland, where it grows on rocky ranges, hills and sandplains in sandy clay loam.
