= Acacia glaucicaesia =

Scientific classification
- Kingdom: Plantae
- Clade: Tracheophytes
- Clade: Angiosperms
- Clade: Eudicots
- Clade: Rosids
- Order: Fabales
- Family: Fabaceae
- Subfamily: Caesalpinioideae
- Clade: Mimosoid clade
- Genus: Acacia
- Species: A. glaucicaesia

Binomial name
- Acacia glaucicaesia Domin
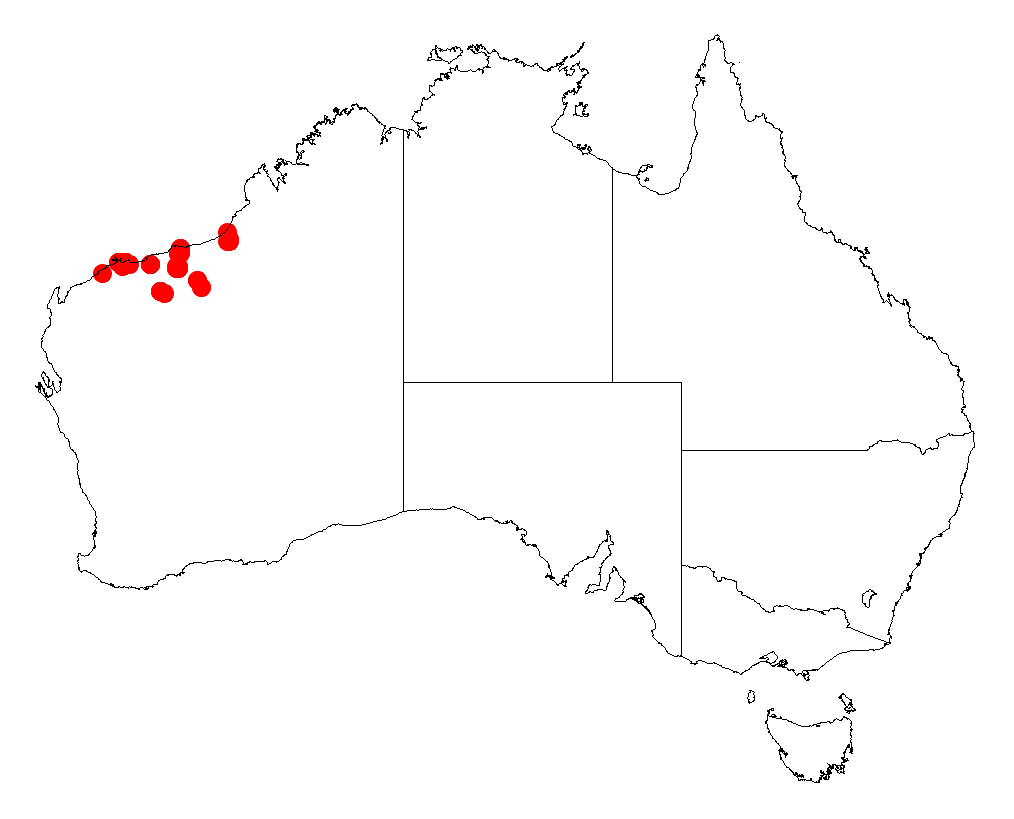
- Occurrence data from AVH

Synonyms
- ? Acacia aff. victoriae (E.E.Clement s.n.); Acacia glabriflora Maiden & Blakely nom. illeg.; Racosperma glaucocaesium (Domin) Pedley

Species of legume

Acacia glaucicaesia is a species of flowering plant in the family Fabaceae and is endemic to the north-west of Western Australia. It is a glabrous shrub or tree with branchlets covered with a white, powdery bloom, elliptic to narrowly elliptic or lance-shaped phyllodes, spherical heads of pale yellow flowers and narrowly oblong, papery pods covered with a powdery bloom.

== Description ==
Acacia glaucicaesia is a glabrous shrub or tree that typically grows to a height of 2–3 m (6 ft 7 in – 9 ft 10 in), sometimes up to 7 m (23 ft) and has branchlets covered with a white, powdery bloom. Its phyllodes are usually elliptic to narrowly elliptic or lance-shaped, 15–25 mm (0.59–0.98 in) long, 7–13 mm (0.28–0.51 in) wide and glaucous without a prominent midrib. There are spiny stipules at the base of the phyllodes on young plants, later minute tooth-like projections. The flowers are borne in many spherical heads in racemes up to 60 mm (2.4 in) long on peduncles 7–10 mm (0.28–0.39 in) long, each head with 35 to 50 pale yellow flowers. Flowering occurs from July to October, and the fruit is narrowly oblong, up to 40 mm (1.6 in) long and 12–13 mm (0.47–0.51 in) wide, papery and covered with a powdery bloom. The seeds are oblong to egg-shaped, 4.5–5.0 mm (0.18–0.20 in) long and slightly shiny, brown to black with a small aril.

== Taxonomy ==
Acacia glaucicaesia was first formally described in 1926 by the botanist Karel Domin in Bibliotheca Botanica from specimens collected by Emile Clement. The specific epithet (glaucicaesia) means 'bluish-grey'.

== Distribution and habitat ==
This species of wattle is known only from a few scattered localities between the western part of the Pilbara regions of Western Australia, commonly forming almost pure stands on floodplains in sandy, clay or loamy soils.

== Conservation status ==
Acacia glaucicaesia is listed as "not threatened" by the Government of Western Australia Department of Biodiversity, Conservation and Attractions.

== See also ==
- List of Acacia species
