= Emile Clement =

German ethnographer and collector (1844–1928)

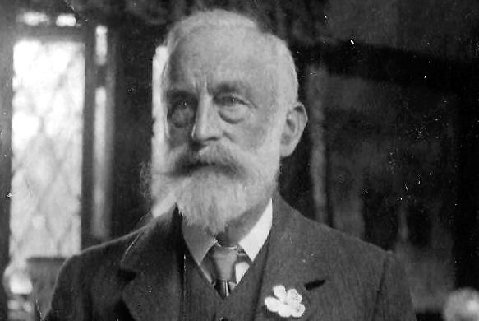
- Born: 1844
- Died: 1928 (aged 83–84)
- Occupation: Botanical collector, scientific collector

Emile Louis Bruno Clement (1844–1928) was a prominent collector of ethnographic artefacts and natural history specimens from northwest Australia at the end of the nineteenth and early twentieth centuries.

== Biography ==
Emile Clement was born in Muskau, Niederschlesischer, Oberlausitzkreis, Sachsen, Lower Silesia (Prussia) in early 1844—now called Bad Muskau and situated in the Federal State of Saxony on the border with Poland (Polish name: Muskau (Muzaków)). He died at Hove in Sussex on 4 August 1928, aged 84 and was buried in the south aspect of Hove cemetery. His wife Emily Elizabeth died two years later and was buried alongside her husband.

Throughout his life, Dr Clement pursued a variety of occupations, including archaeologist, teacher, naturalist, mining engineer, ethnographer, children's book author, and ethnographic dealer.

During the period 1877 to 1890 Dr Clement undertook a series of archaeological excavations in Silesia, and sold collections of Silesian Bronze Age archaeological material to museums throughout the United Kingdom including the British Museum, the Department of Science and Art museums in Edinburgh, Cardiff and Dublin, the Museum of Archaeology and Anthropology, University of Cambridge and the Reading Museum.

However Dr Clement's largest contribution to museums was the sale or donation of numerous collections of Western Australian Aboriginal artefacts to museums throughout Britain and Europe. During the period 1896–1928, Clement sold over 1600 Australian Aboriginal artefacts from Western Australia to museums throughout England, Scotland, Ireland, and continental Europe. In many of these museums the Clement material comprises a substantial part of their total holdings of Australian Aboriginal material.

Dr Clement made three trips to Western Australia: 1895; 1896–1898; and 1899–1900. These trips related to his involvement with establishing and later managing a number of gold mines around the Towranna and Roebourne regions. Among these mines were the Towranna Gold Mines of WA Ltd lease at Towranna[aka Toweranna] and leases held by the Lydia Exploration Syndicate on the Lower Nickol field northwest of Roebourne.

Clement's views on the relationship between Aboriginal people and settlers are recorded in an 1899 letter to the St James's Gazette.

A study of the acquisition of different museums holdings of Western Australian Aboriginal objects related to Clement material suggests there were two distinct stages to Dr Clement's involvement. The early collections (1896–1910) were collected by Dr Clement, some probably with the assistance of his son Adolphe Emile Clement, who worked as mine manager at Towranna. In contrast, the collections acquired by museums during the second stage (1923–1928) seem to be derived from residents from the North-west area of Western Australia, who sent the material to Dr Clement in England, who then sold it to museums.

As well as the ethnographic and archaeological material, Dr Clement contributed substantial quantities of botanical material from Northwest Australia to the Royal Botanic Garden, Kew between 1898 and 1900, as well as to herbaria in Leiden and Berlin. Collections of his zoological material, containing many type specimens, are held in the British Museum (Natural History), Liverpool Museum and the Oxford University Museum.

== Dr Clement's collections ==
=== Museums holding collections of Western Australian Aboriginal material acquired from Dr Clement ===
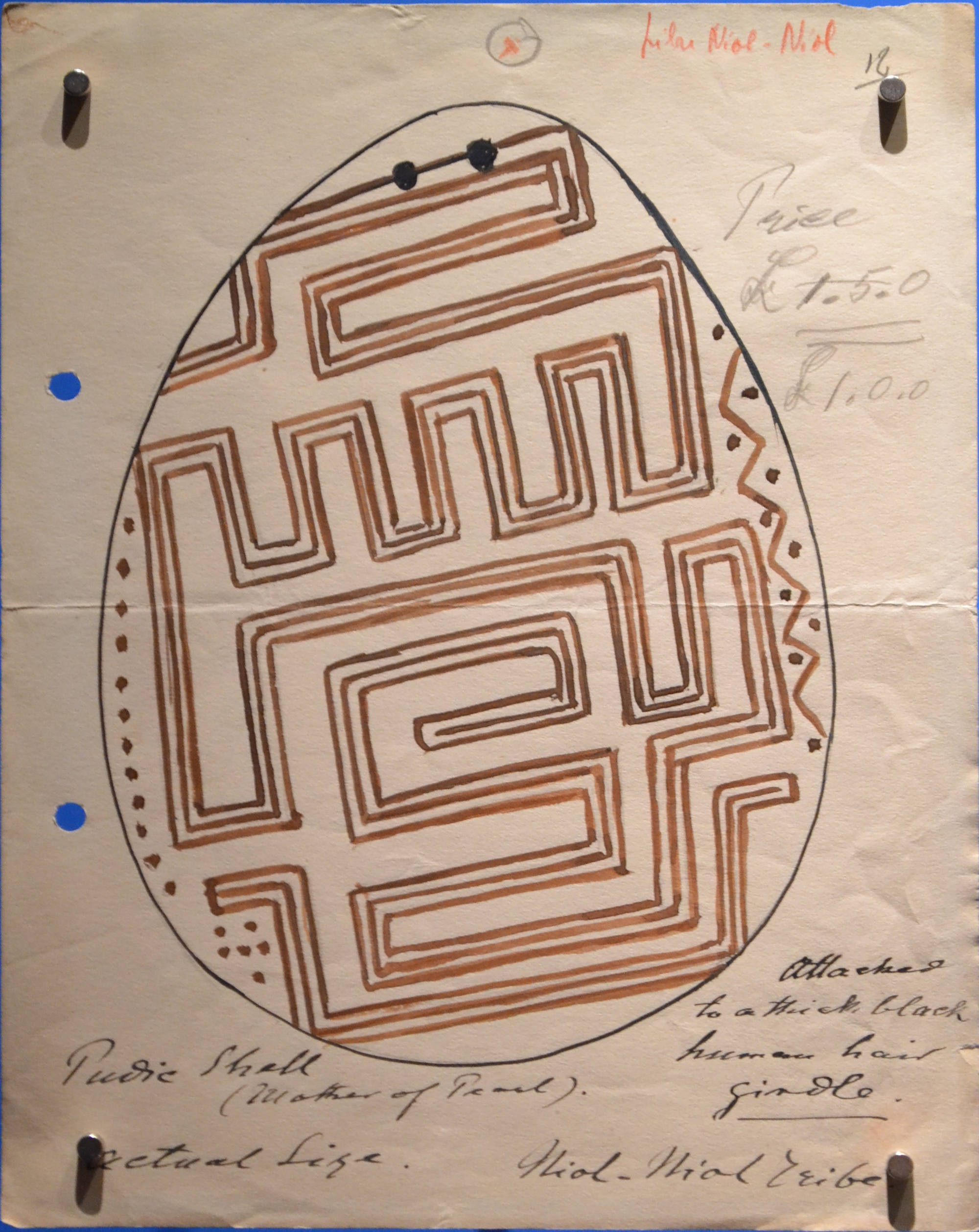
Emile Clement's drawing of a riji (incised pearl-shell ornament) from the Kimberley region of Western Australia, acquired by the Musée d'ethnographie de Genève.

- British Museum, London, England – acquired in 1896 and 1898
- Horniman Museum, London, England
- Economic Botany Museum, Royal Botanic Gardens, Kew, London, England
- Science Museum, (from the Wellcome Museum), London, England
- Pitt Rivers Museum, Oxford, England
- Museum of Archaeology and Anthropology, University of Cambridge, Cambridge, England (photographs only, not artefacts)
- Manchester Museum originally from the Bankfield Museum, Halifax, England
- Bristol City Museum and Art Gallery, England
- Ipswich Museum, England
- Brighton Museum and Art Gallery, England
- National Museum of Ireland, Dublin, Ireland
- National Museum of Scotland, Edinburgh, Scotland
- Kelvingrove Art Gallery and Museum, Glasgow, Scotland
- Hunterian Museum, Glasgow, Scotland
- Museum für Völkerkunde, Vienna, Austria
- Hamburg Museum, Germany
- Weltkulturen Museum Frankfurt am Main, Germany
- Staatliche Museen, Berlin, Germany
- Dresden Museum, Germany
- Göttingen University Museum, Germany
- Leipzig Museum, Germany
- Linden-Museum, Stuttgart, Germany (six photographs)
- Ubersee-Museum, Bremen, Germany
- Museum Volkenkunde, Leiden, The Netherlands
- Musée d'Ethnographie de Genève, Switzerland
- Museum der Kulturen, Basel, Switzerland
- Historisches und Völkerkundemuseum St Gallen, Switzerland
- Moscow University Museum of Anthropology, Russia

=== Museums holding collections of German Bronze Age material acquired from Clement ===
- British Museum – acquired in 1877
- National Museum of Scotland – acquired in 1877
- National Museum of Ireland – acquired in 1883
- Reading Museum – acquired in 1885
- Ashmolean Museum – acquired in 1886
- Museum of Archaeology and Anthropology, University of Cambridge - excavated in 1889, acquired in 1890
- National Museum of Wales - acquired in 1886

=== Institutions holding collections of natural history material acquired from Clement ===
- Herbarium, Royal Botanic Gardens, Kew
- Natural History Museum, London
- Oxford University Museum of Natural History
- Botanischer Garten und Botanisches Museum, Berlin-Dahlem
- Nationaal Herbarium Nederland, Leiden

=== Flora named after Clement ===
- Acacia clementii Domin (currently Acacia pyrifolia)
- Acacia clementii Maiden & Blakely (as 'clementi') (currently Acacia xiphophylla)
- Alysicarpus muelleri var. clementii Schindler
- Amaranthus clementii Domin (as 'Amarantus')
- Brachyscome clementii Domin (as 'Brachycome')
- Convolvulus clementii Domin
- Erythraea clementii Domin
- Euphorbia clementii Domin
- Goodenia clementii K.Krause
- Helipterum clementii Domin
- Hibiscus campylochlamys var. clementii Domin
- Justicia clementii Domin (as 'Justicea') (currently Rostellularia adscendens var. clementii (Domin) R.Barker)
- Mimulus clementii Domin
- Neptunia dimorphantha var. clementii Domin
- Neurachne clementii Domin
- Panicum clementii Domin
- Paspalidium clementii (Domin) C.E.Hubb.
- Polygala stenoclada var. clementii Domin
- Psoralea clementii Domin
- Rumex clementii Domin
- Sida clementii Domin
- Stackhousia clementii Domin
- Tephrosia clementii Skan
- Tephrosia rosea var. clementii Domin
- Tribulus angustifolius var. clementii Domin
- Trichinium clementii Farmar (as 'Clementi') (currently Ptilotus clementii)
- Triumfetta bartramia var. clementii Domin (currently Triumfetta clementii)

=== Botanical type specimens collected by Clement ===
- Solanum gabrielae Domin
- Acetosa vesicaria (Rosy dock)

=== Zoological type specimens collected by Clement ===
- Cephaloplatys clementii, sp. n.
- Pseudælia clementi, sp. n.
- Roebournea diversa

=== Zoological specimens named after Clement ===
- Jalmenus clementi Druce, 1902
