= Euphorbia occidentaustralica =

Scientific classification
- Kingdom: Plantae
- Clade: Tracheophytes
- Clade: Angiosperms
- Clade: Eudicots
- Clade: Rosids
- Order: Malpighiales
- Family: Euphorbiaceae
- Genus: Euphorbia
- Species: E. occidentaustralica

Binomial name
- Euphorbia occidentaustralica Radcl.-Sm. & Govaerts

Synonyms
- Euphorbia clementii Domin

Plant species in the spurge family

Euphorbia occidentaustralica is a herbaceous plant species that occurs on rocky hillsides and stony ground in the Pilbara in Western Australia. It has an erect habit, growing to 60 cm high. It is classified as "Priority Two - Poorly Known" under the Wildlife Conservation Act in Western Australia.

== Taxonomy ==
In 1927 Czech botanist Karel Domin scientifically described a species in Bibliotheca Botanica, from plant material collected by Emile Clement between the Ashburton and Yule Rivers, which he named Euphorbia clementii. However, the almost identical name Euphorbia clementei had already been used by Pierre Edmond Boissier in 1838 for a species from the Iberian Peninsula and north Africa. Therefore the new name, Euphorbia occidentaustralica, was created for the species in 1996 by Alan Radcliffe-Smith (1938-2007) and Rafaël Govaerts. The species is classified in the Euphorbiagenus as part of the Euphorbiaceae family.
