= Triumfetta clementii =

Scientific classification
- Kingdom: Plantae
- Clade: Tracheophytes
- Clade: Angiosperms
- Clade: Eudicots
- Clade: Rosids
- Order: Malvales
- Family: Malvaceae
- Genus: Triumfetta
- Species: T. clementii

Binomial name
- Triumfetta clementii (Domin) Rye

Synonyms
- Triumfetta bartramia var. clementii Domin

Species of shrub

Triumfetta clementii is a shrub species that occurs in the north-west of Western Australia. It has an erect, spreading habit, growing to between 0.15 and 0.6 metres high. Yellow flowers appear between May and October in the species' native range.

The taxon was first formally described by Czech botanist Karel Domin in 1930 in Bibliotheca Botanica, based on a collection by Emile Clement between the Ashburton and De Grey Rivers. Domin gave it the name Triumfetta bartramia var. clementii. It was promoted to species status in 1997. The World Checklist of Selected Plant Families has not established Triumfetta clementii as an accepted name.
