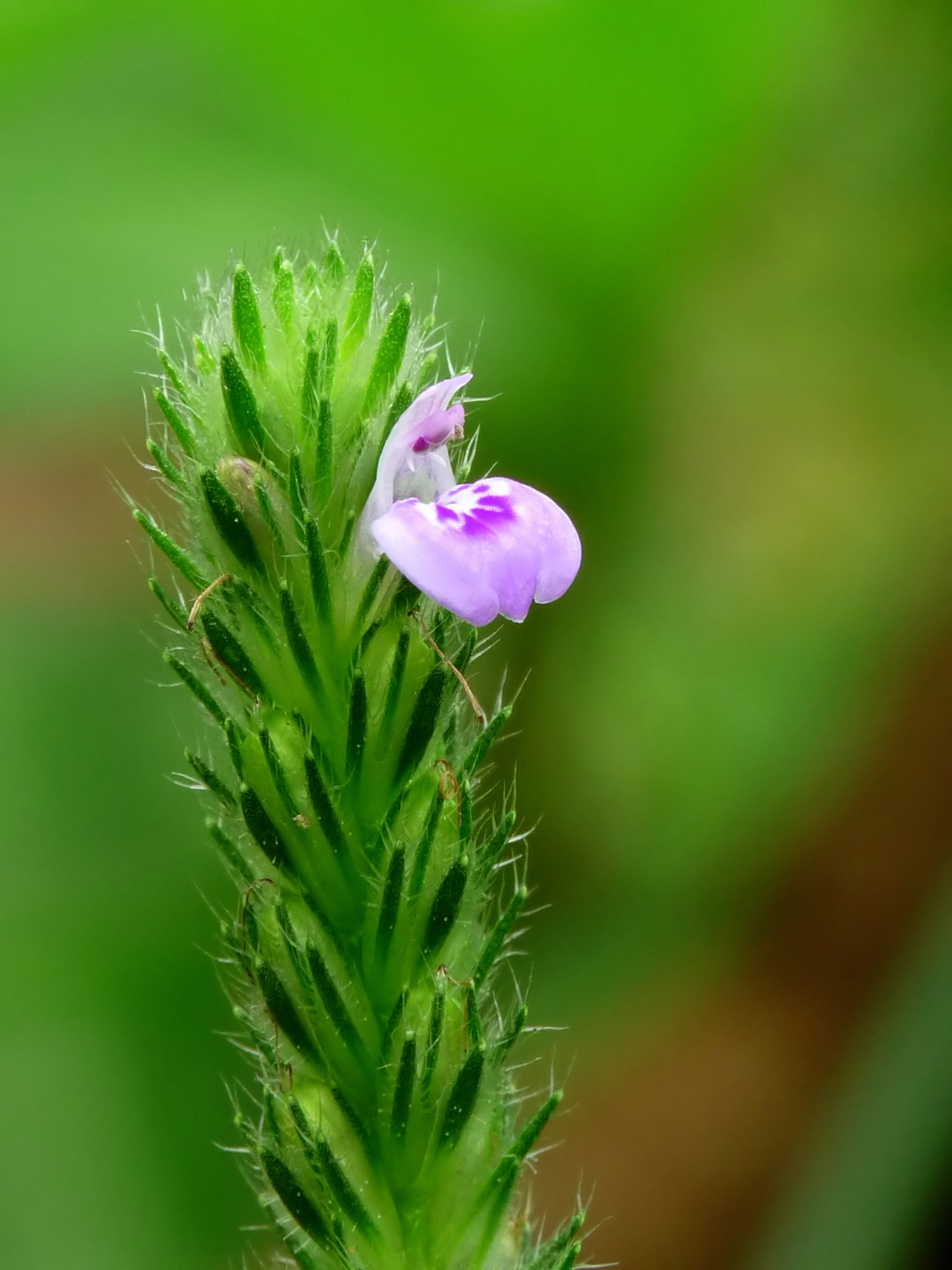
- Rostellularia procumbens in Kadavoor, Kerala, India.

Scientific classification
- Kingdom: Plantae
- Clade: Tracheophytes
- Clade: Angiosperms
- Clade: Eudicots
- Clade: Asterids
- Order: Lamiales
- Family: Acanthaceae
- Genus: Rostellularia
- Species: R. procumbens

Binomial name
- Rostellularia procumbens (L.) Nees (1847)

Synonyms
- Synonymy: Dianthera americana Blanco (1837), sensu auct.; Dianthera ciliata Blanco (1845), nom. illeg.; Ecbolium procumbens (L.) Kuntze; Justicia hayatae var. decumbens Yamam. (1926); Justicia hirtella Wall. in Numer. List: n.° 2448 (1830); Justicia japonica Thunb. (1784); Justicia media R.Br. (1810); Justicia procumbens L.; Justicia procumbens var. hirsuta Yamam. (1926); Justicia procumbens f. japonica (Thunb.) H.Hara (1948); Justicia procumbens var. leucantha Honda (1930); Justicia procumbens var. linearifolia Yamam. (1926); Justicia procumbens var. riukiuensis Yamam. (1926); Justicia procumbens var. typica Domin (1929), not validly publ.; Ptyssiglottis sarmentosa (Nees) Boerl. (1899); Rostellaria adenostachya Nees (1832); Rostellaria japonica Carrière (1866); Rostellularia adenostachya Nees (1847); Rostellularia blancoi Hassk. (1864); Rostellularia cradengensis Bremek. (1961); Rostellularia elegans Bremek. (1961); Rostellularia japonica (Thunb.) J.L.Ellis (1980 publ. 1982); Rostellularia juncea Nees (1847); Rostellularia magnifolia Bremek. (1948); Rostellularia media Nees (1847); Rostellularia neglecta Bremek. (1961); Rostellaria procumbens (L.) Nees; Rostellularia procumbens f. alboflora J.L.Liu (2000); Rostellularia procumbens var. hirsuta (Yamam.) S.S.Ying (1989); Rostellularia procumbens var. linearifolia (Yamam.) S.S.Ying (1989); Rostellularia procumbens var. riukiuensis (Yamam.) S.S.Ying (1989); Rostellularia sarmentosa Nees (1847); Rostellularia sundana Bremek. (1948); Rostellularia trichochila Miq. (1861); Rungia sarmentosa (Nees) Valeton (1908)

= Rostellularia procumbens =

Species of flowering plant

Rostellularia procumbens, commonly known as water willow (Marathi: करंबल, romanized: Karambal, पित्तपापडा, Pitpapada, कलमाशी, Kalmashi,Tamil: கோடகசாலை, romanized: Kōṭakacālai), is a small flowering plant belonging to the Acanthaceae family. It is native to the Indian subcontinent, Indochina, China, Peninsular Malaysia, Sumatra, Java, Sulawesi, the Philippines, Japan, and Korea. It is found in higher elevations, commonly in humid areas.

The leaves' juice can be squeezed in the eyes in cases of ophthalmia.

== Description ==
This is a prostrate perennial herb with elliptic leaves. Pink flowers are born in terminal cylindrical spikes. Fruit capsule is hairy.

== Habit and Habitat ==
Herbaceous plant growing either erect or decumbent. Seen in or near small water bodies and wet places.

== Gallery ==
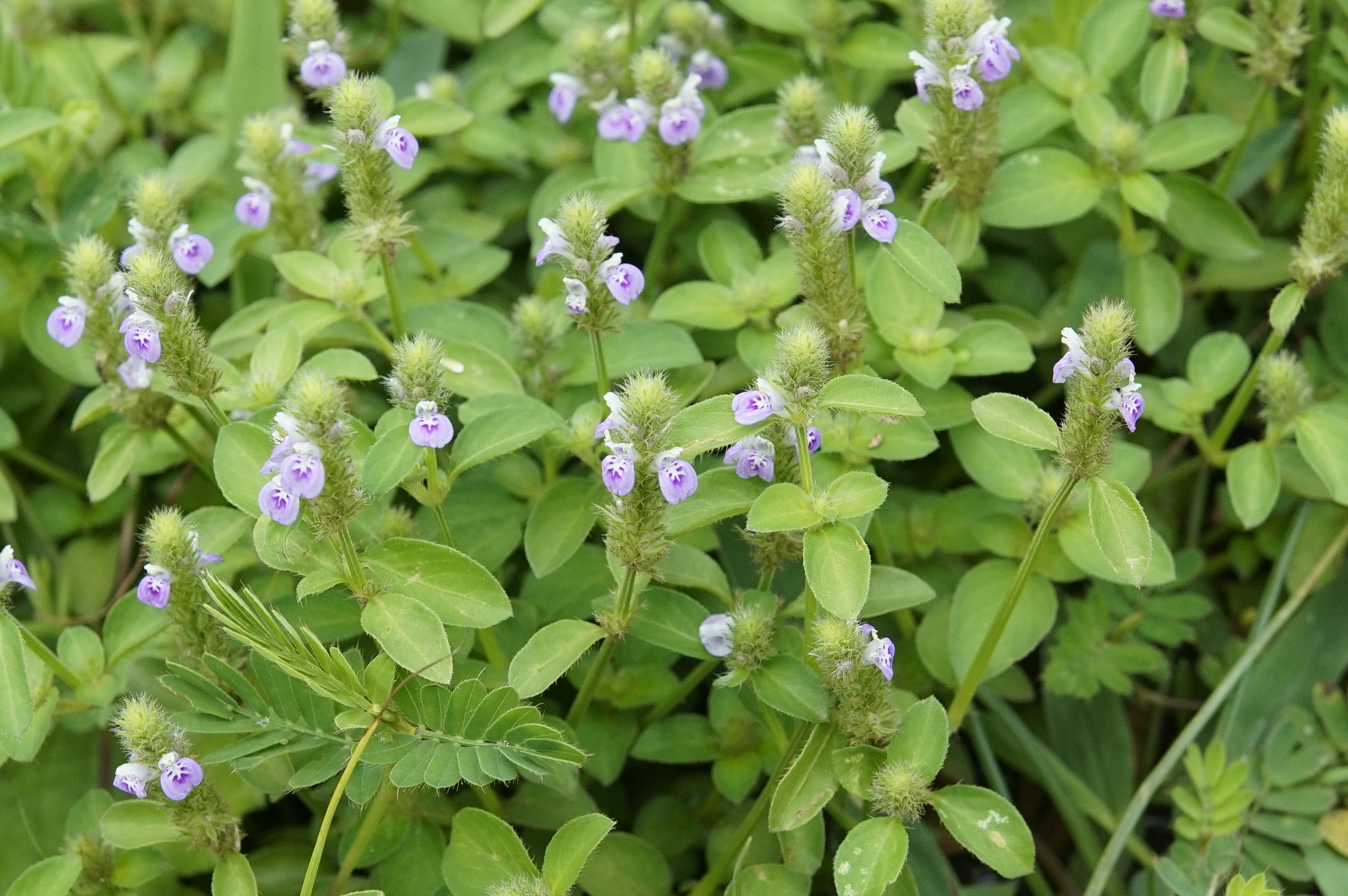

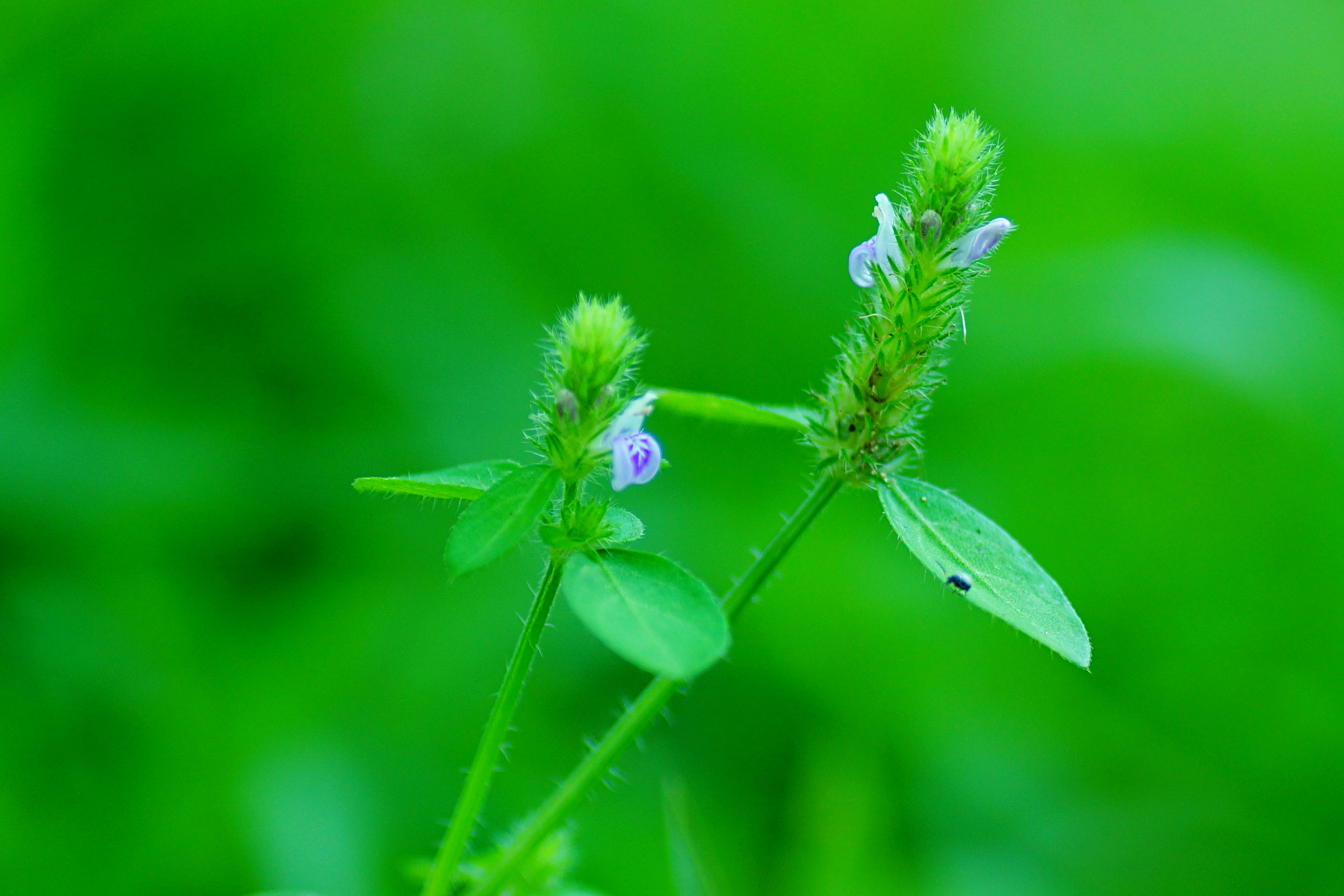
