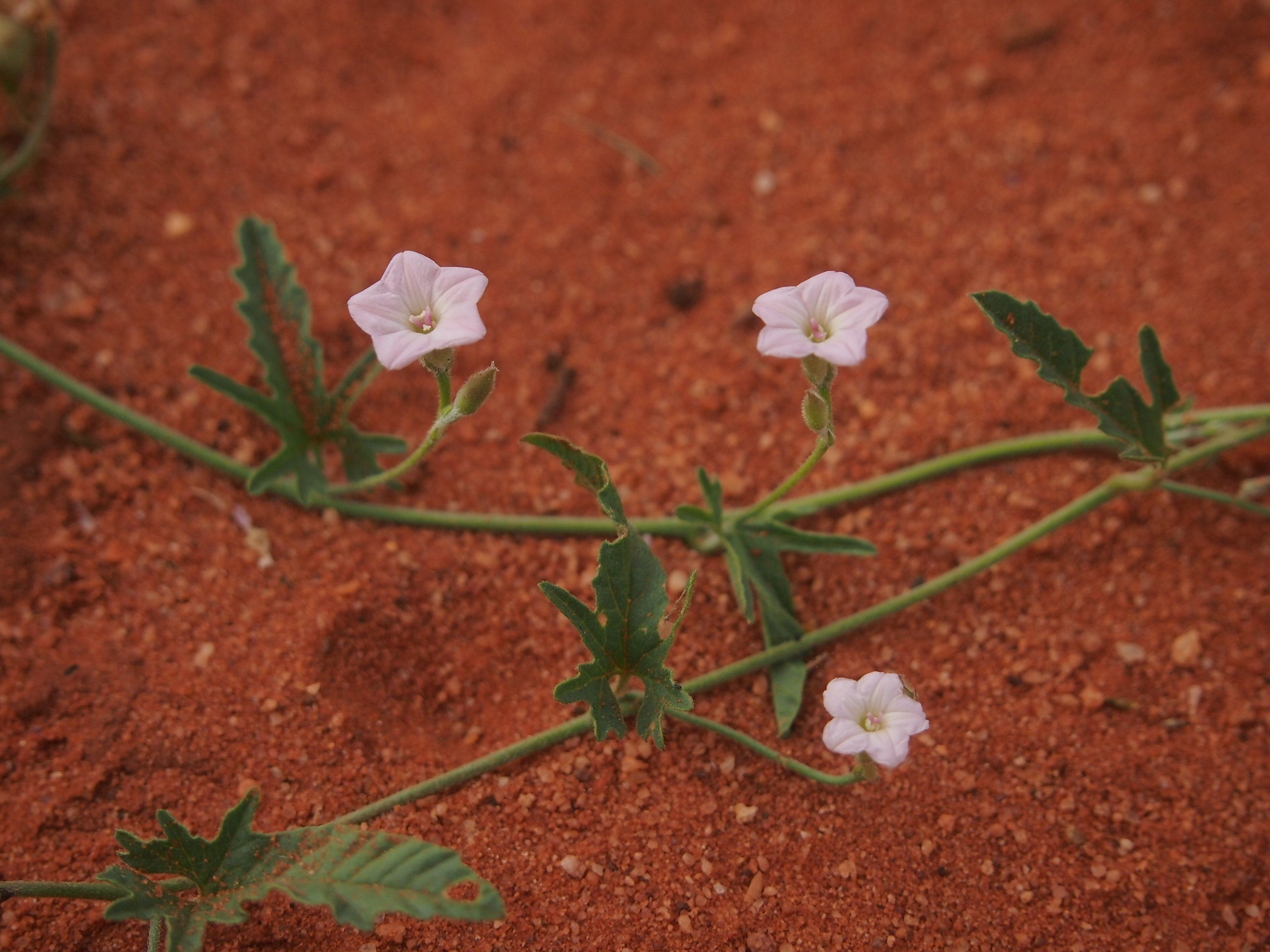

Scientific classification
- Kingdom: Plantae
- Clade: Embryophytes
- Clade: Tracheophytes
- Clade: Spermatophytes
- Clade: Angiosperms
- Clade: Eudicots
- Clade: Asterids
- Order: Solanales
- Family: Convolvulaceae
- Genus: Convolvulus
- Species: C. clementii

Binomial name
- Convolvulus clementii Domin

= Convolvulus clementii =

Species of bindweed

Convolvulus clementii commonly known as desert bindweed, is a flowering plant in the family Convolvulaceae and grows in all states of mainland Australia. It is a trailing perennial with variable leaves and white or pink flowers.

== Description ==
Convolvulus clementii is a trailing, perennial climber, stems terete, may be 1 m (3 ft 3 in) long or more, sometimes ribbed and hairy. The leaves are arranged alternately, variable, upper leaves oval-shaped, 1–6 cm (0.39–2.36 in) long, 0.5–3.5 cm (0.20–1.38 in) wide, petiole 2–30 mm (0.079–1.181 in) long margins lobed, rounded to blunt and ending in a point. Flowers are borne singly or in a small group, funnel-shaped, pink or white and 8–13 mm (0.31–0.51 in) long and 4–10 mm (0.16–0.39 in) in diameter. Flowering may occur anytime of the year and the fruit is a globe-shaped capsule, 5–7 mm (0.20–0.28 in) long, 4–6 mm (0.16–0.24 in) in diameter and the seeds are dark brown to grey.

== Taxonomy and naming ==
The species was first formally described in 1930 by Czech botanist Karel Domin and the description was published in Bibliotheca Botanica, based on a collection by Emile Clement between the Ashburton and De Grey Rivers. The specific epithet (clementii) is in honour of Emile Clement.

== Distribution and habitat ==
Desert bindweed grows on clay, seasonally wet and sandy soils in New South Wales, Victoria, South Australia, Queensland, Western Australia and the Northern Territory.
