= Eric Frederic Drabble =

British botanist

- Born: 1877; Hasland, Derbyshire
- Died: 3 August 1933 (aged 55–56); Totland Bay near Freshwater, Isle of Wight
- Scientific career
- Fields: Botany
- Author abbrev. (botany): Drabble

Eric Frederic Drabble FLS (1877–1933) was a British botanist and leading authority on British Viola.

Drabble was a lecturer in botany at St Thomas's Hospital Medical School from 1901 to 1903. In 1903 he graduated with a DSc from the University of London. He was a lecturer from 1903 to 1905 at the Royal College of Science. He then moved to Liverpool University where he was a lecturer from 1905 to 1906; there Drabble and Leo Farmar were the two members of the economic botany section of the scientific staff of Liverpool University's Institute of Commercial Research in the Tropics. Drabble was a lecturer at Northern Polytechnic Institute from 1906 to 1924.

In 1906 Drabble married Hilda Lake (1881–1965), a daughter of Thomas Henry Lake, who was a miller and corn merchant in Truro. Before their marriage, Eric and Hilda collected botanical specimens together. As a married couple, they jointly published a number of papers, sometimes with other co-authors. When Eric Drabble died in 1933, his estate was valued at £6,387.
