= Rostellularia =

Scientific classification
- Kingdom: Plantae
- Clade: Tracheophytes
- Clade: Angiosperms
- Clade: Eudicots
- Clade: Asterids
- Order: Lamiales
- Family: Acanthaceae
- Genus: Rostellularia; Rchb.

Genus of plants

Rostellularia is a genus of flowering plants belonging to the family Acanthaceae.

Its native range is Northeastern Tropical Africa, Madagascar, Southern Arabian Peninsula, Tropical and Subtropical Asia to Australia.

Species:

- Rostellularia adscendens (R.Br.) R.M.Barker
- Rostellularia andamanica Vasudeva Rao
- Rostellularia ardjunensis Bremek.
- Rostellularia assamica (C.B.Clarke) J.L.Ellis
- Rostellularia backeri Bremek.
- Rostellularia bankaoensis Bremek.
- Rostellularia brachystachya Nees
- Rostellularia chiengmaiensis Bremek.
- Rostellularia diffusa (Willd.) Nees
- Rostellularia hayatae (Yamam.) S.S.Ying
- Rostellularia hedyotidifolia (Nees) Nees
- Rostellularia hijangensis Bremek.
- Rostellularia humilis H.S.Lo
- Rostellularia lanceolata Bremek.
- Rostellularia latispica (C.B.Clarke) Bremek.
- Rostellularia linearifolia Bremek.
- Rostellularia mollissima (Nees) Nees
- Rostellularia nagpurensis (V.A.W.Graham) M.R.Almeida
- Rostellularia obtusa Nees
- Rostellularia ovata Bremek.
- Rostellularia palustris Bremek.
- Rostellularia procumbens (L.) Nees
- Rostellularia psychotrioides Nees
- Rostellularia quinqueangularis (J.Koenig ex Roxb.) Nees
- Rostellularia rachaburensis Bremek.
- Rostellularia royeniana Nees
- Rostellularia serpyllifolia (Benth. ex C.B.Clarke) Bremek.
- Rostellularia simplex Wight
- Rostellularia smeruensis Bremek.
