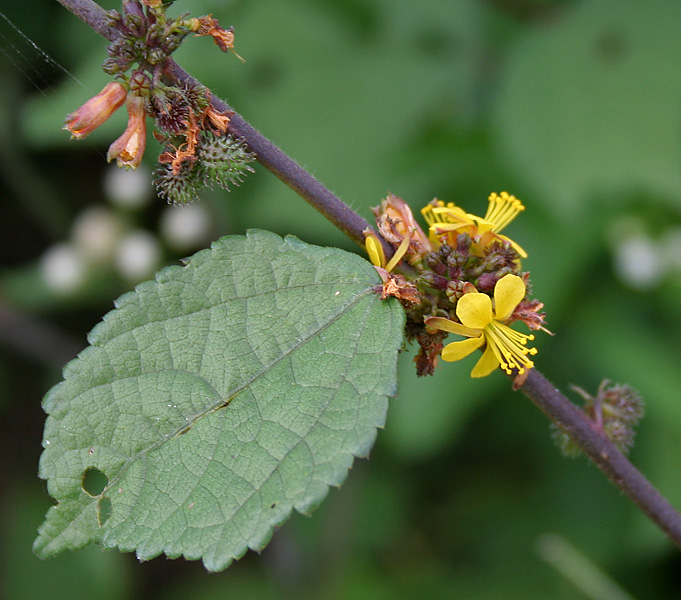
- Triumfetta rhomboidea

Scientific classification
- Kingdom: Plantae
- Clade: Tracheophytes
- Clade: Angiosperms
- Clade: Eudicots
- Clade: Rosids
- Order: Malvales
- Family: Malvaceae
- Subfamily: Grewioideae
- Genus: Triumfetta; L.

= Triumfetta =

Genus of flowering plants

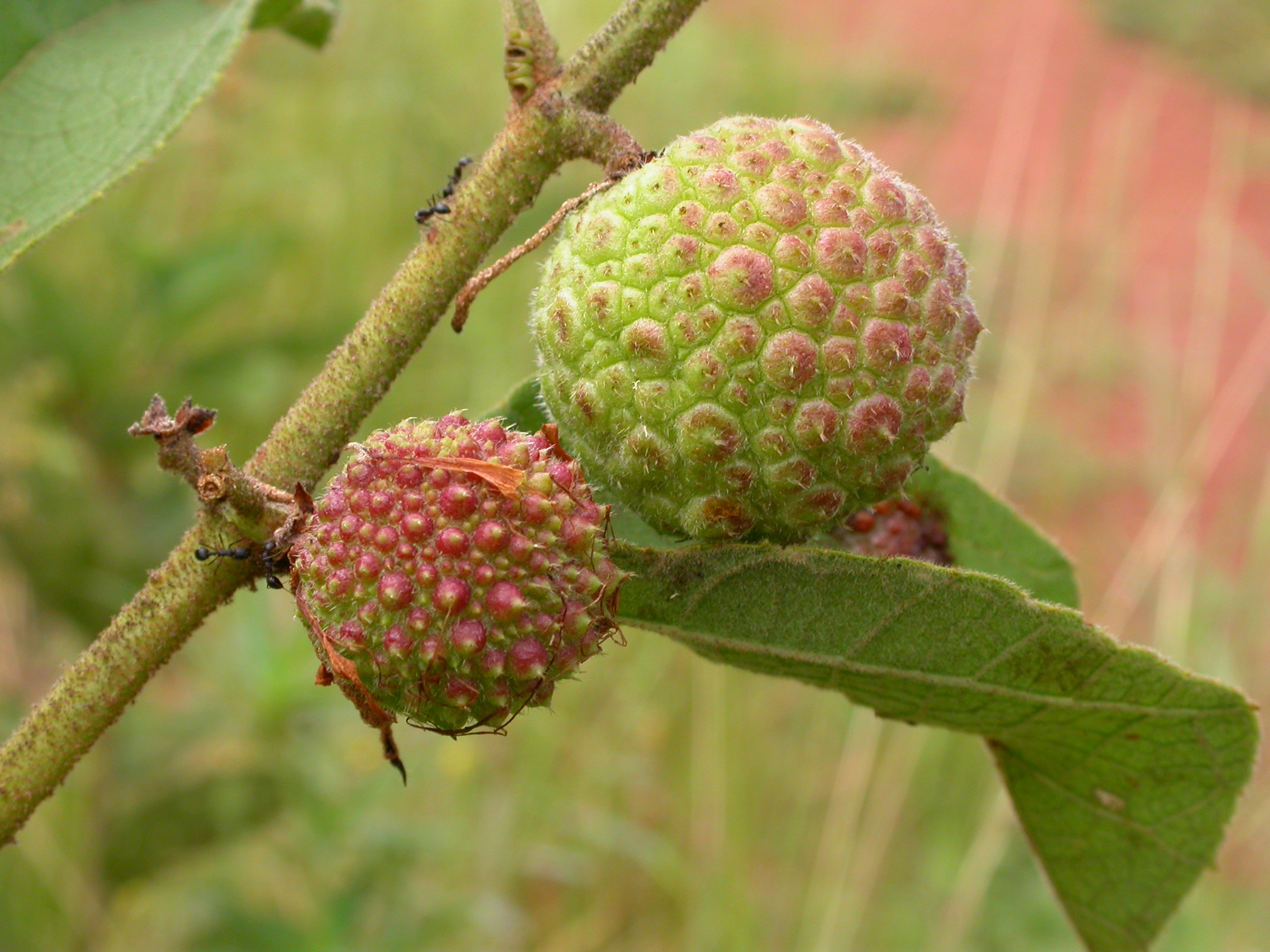
Triumfetta lepidota

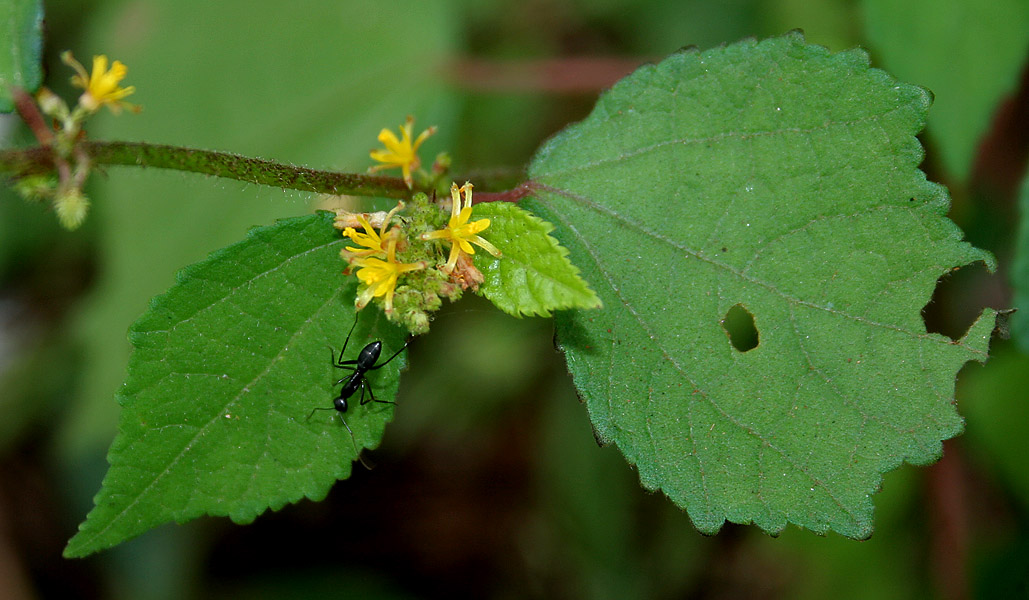
Triumfetta pentandra

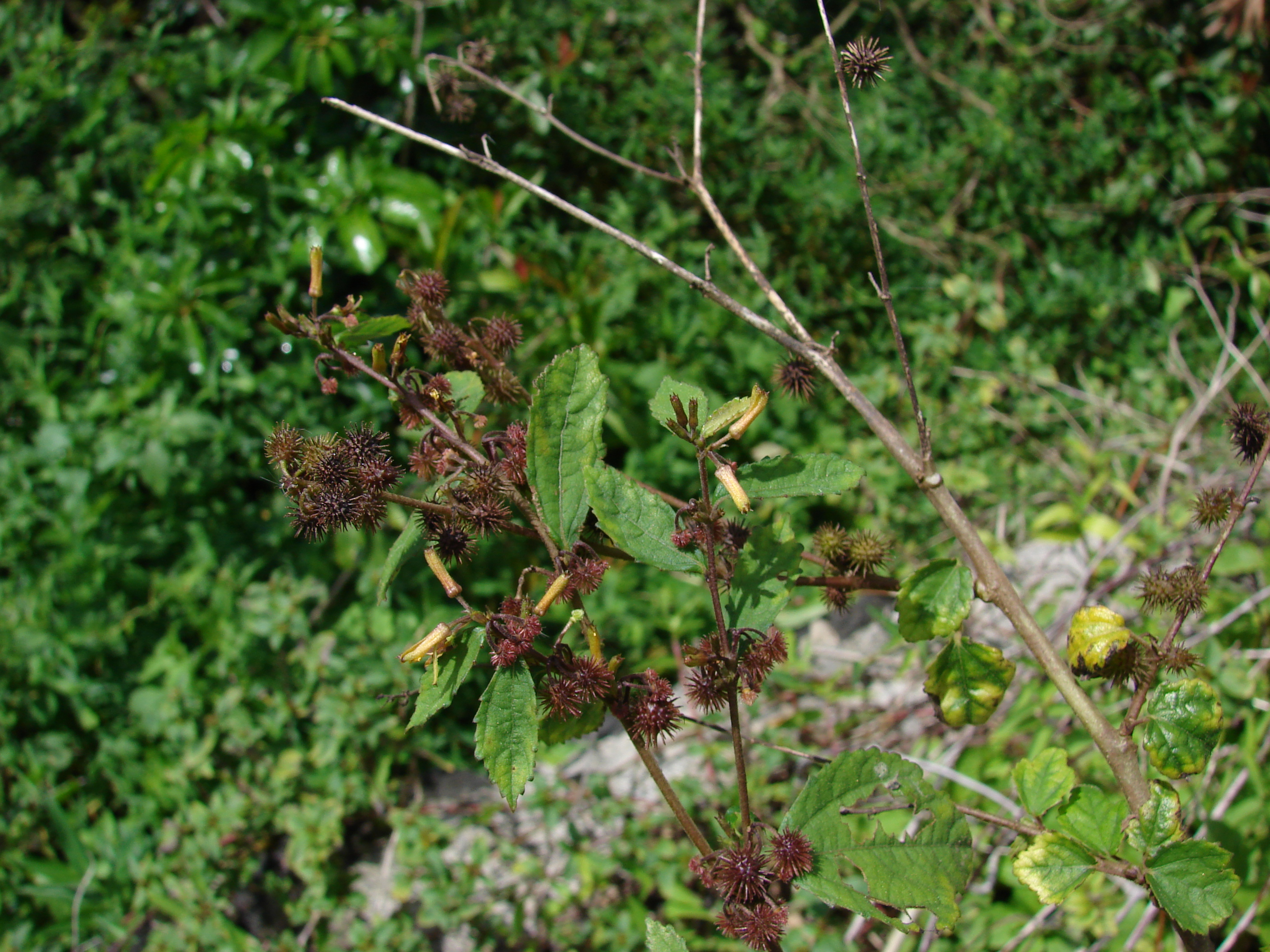
Triumfetta semitriloba

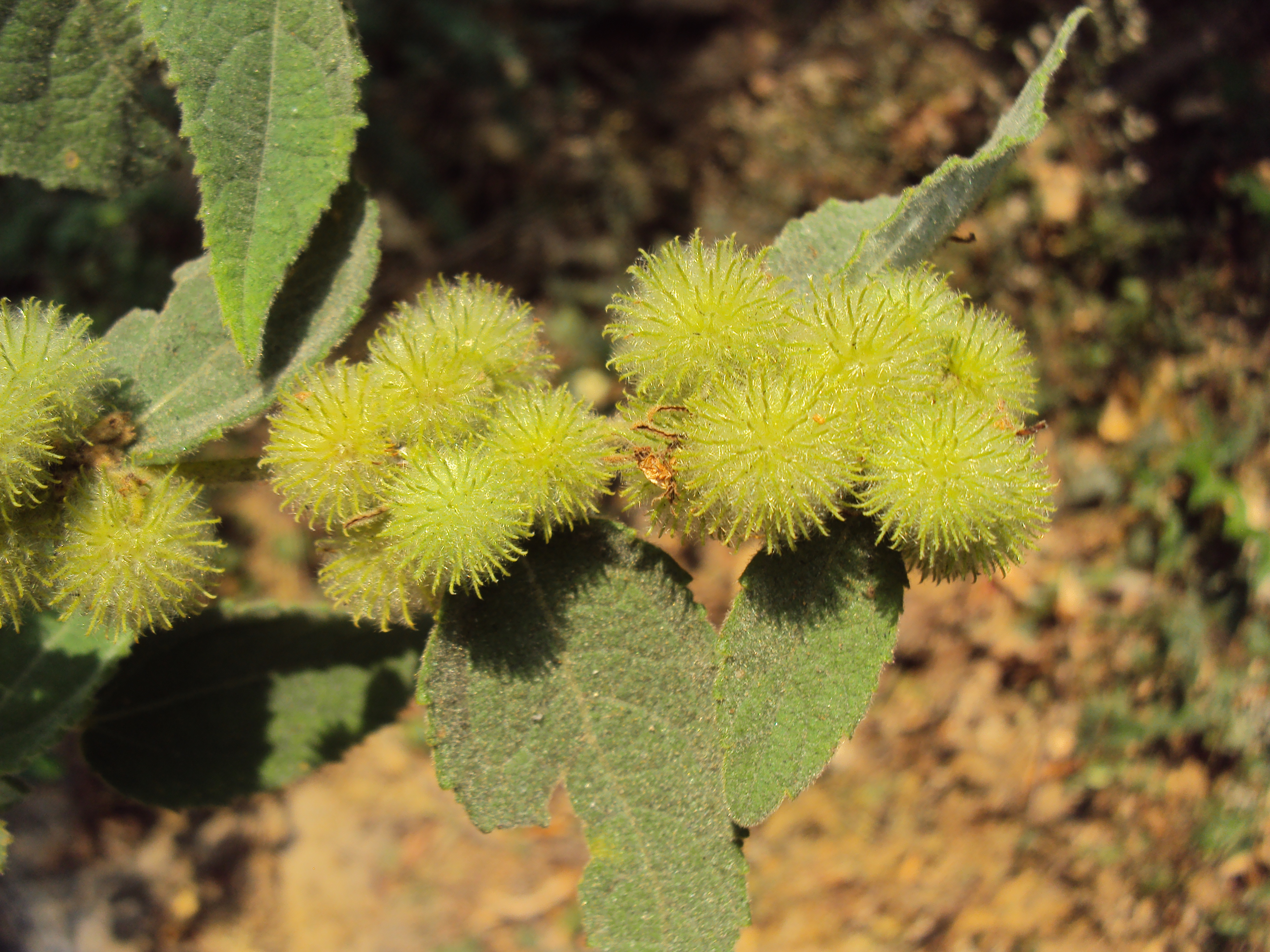
Triumfetta pilosa

Triumfetta is a genus of plants in the family Malvaceae. Burbark is a common name for plants in this genus.

The genus was originally described and published by Carl Linnaeus in his book Sp. Pl. on page 444 in 1753.

There are about 176 species which are widespread across tropical regions.

== Species ==
These include:

- Triumfetta abutiloides A.St.-Hil.
- Triumfetta acahuizotlanensis Gonz.-Martínez, J.Jiménez Ram. & Rios-Carr.
- Triumfetta acracantha Hochr.
- Triumfetta actinocarpa S.Moore
- Triumfetta albida (Domin) Halford
- Triumfetta althaeoides Lam.
- Triumfetta amuletum Sprague
- Triumfetta angolensis Sprague & Hutch.
- Triumfetta annua L.
- Triumfetta antrorsa Halford
- Triumfetta antunesii Sprague & Hutch.
- Triumfetta appendiculata F.Muell.
- Triumfetta aquila Halford
- Triumfetta arborescens (Seem.) Sprague
- Triumfetta arnhemica Halford
- Triumfetta aspera Halford
- Triumfetta attenuata Lay
- Triumfetta barbosa Lay
- Triumfetta benguelensis Wawra & Peyr.
- Triumfetta benguetensis Sprague
- Triumfetta bicornuta Turcz.
- Triumfetta bogotensis DC.
- Triumfetta brachistacantha Standl.
- Triumfetta brachyceras K.Schum.
- Triumfetta bradshawii F.Muell.
- Triumfetta breviaculeata Halford
- Triumfetta brevipes S.Watson
- Triumfetta calycina Turcz.
- Triumfetta calzadae Fryxell
- Triumfetta cana Blume
- Triumfetta carteri Halford
- Triumfetta caudata Triana & Planch.
- Triumfetta centralis Halford
- Triumfetta chaetocarpa F.Muell.
- Triumfetta chihuahuensis Standl.
- Triumfetta cinerea Halford
- Triumfetta cladara Halford
- Triumfetta clementii (Domin) Rye
- Triumfetta clivorum Halford
- Triumfetta cordifolia A. Rich.
- Triumfetta coriacea Hochr.
- Triumfetta coronata Halford
- Triumfetta cucullata Fernald
- Triumfetta dekindtiana Engl.
- Triumfetta delicatula Sprague & Hutch.
- Triumfetta denticulata R.Br. ex Benth.
- Triumfetta deserticola Halford
- Triumfetta digitata (Oliv.) Sprague & Hutch.
- Triumfetta dilungensis Adamska & Lisowski
- Triumfetta dioica Brandegee
- Triumfetta discolor Rose
- Triumfetta echinata Halford
- Triumfetta eriophlebia Hook.f.
- Triumfetta falcifera Rose
- Triumfetta ferruginea Lay
- Triumfetta fissurata Halford
- Triumfetta flavescens Hochst. ex A.Rich.
- Triumfetta galeottiana Turcz.
- Triumfetta geoides Welw. ex Mast.
- Triumfetta glabra Biehler
- Triumfetta glabrior (Sprague & Hutch.) Cheek
- Triumfetta glaucescens Benth.
- Triumfetta glechomoides Welw. ex Mast.
- Triumfetta goldmanii Rose
- Triumfetta gonophora W.W.Thomas & McVaugh
- Triumfetta gossweileri Exell & Mendonça
- Triumfetta grandidens Hance
- Triumfetta grandiflora Vahl
- Triumfetta grandistipulata Wild
- Triumfetta graveolens Blume
- Triumfetta guaranitica Villa
- Triumfetta guazumicarpa Fryxell
- Triumfetta guerrerensis Gual, S.Peralta & Diego
- Triumfetta hapala Halford
- Triumfetta heliocarpoides Bullock
- Triumfetta heptaphylla Exell
- Triumfetta heterocarpa Sprague & Hutch.
- Triumfetta heudelotii Planch. ex Mast.
- Triumfetta hundtii Exell & Mendonça
- Triumfetta incana Halford
- Triumfetta indurata W.W.Thomas & McVaugh
- Triumfetta inermis Halford
- Triumfetta jaegeri Hochr.
- Triumfetta japonica Makino
- Triumfetta johnstonii F.Muell.
- Triumfetta katangensis R.Wilczek
- Triumfetta keniensis R.E.Fr.
- Triumfetta kenneallyi Halford
- Triumfetta kirkii Mast.
- Triumfetta kochii Fryxell
- Triumfetta kundelungensis Adamska & Lisowski
- Triumfetta lappula L.
- Triumfetta lebrunii R.Wilczek
- Triumfetta lepidota K.Schum.
- Triumfetta leptacantha F.Muell.
- Triumfetta likasiensis De Wild.
- Triumfetta litticola Halford
- Triumfetta longicoma A.St.-Hil.
- Triumfetta longicornuta Hutch. & M.B.Moss
- Triumfetta longipedunculata Halford
- Triumfetta maconochieana Halford
- Triumfetta macrocoma K.Schum.
- Triumfetta malebarica J.Koenig ex Rottb.
- Triumfetta marsupiata Halford
- Triumfetta martinezalfaroi Gual & F.Chiang
- Triumfetta marunguensis R.Wilczek
- Triumfetta matudae Lundell
- Triumfetta medusae W.W.Thomas & McVaugh
- Triumfetta mellina Halford
- Triumfetta mexiae C.V.Morton & Lay
- Triumfetta micracantha F.Muell.
- Triumfetta mitchellii Halford
- Triumfetta mollissima Kunth
- Triumfetta monstrosa Halford
- Triumfetta multiglandulosa A.J.Fernandes-Jr. & Ferrucci
- Triumfetta novogaliciana Fryxell
- Triumfetta nutans Halford
- Triumfetta obliqua Roth
- Triumfetta obtusicornis Sprague & Hutch.
- Triumfetta oenpelliensis Halford
- Triumfetta oligacantha Hochr.
- Triumfetta orthacantha Welw. ex Mast.
- Triumfetta paniculata Hook. & Arn.
- Triumfetta pannosa R.Br. ex Halford
- Triumfetta paradoxa (Welw. ex Hiern) Sprague & Hutch.
- Triumfetta parviflora Benth.
- Triumfetta pedunculata De Wild.
- Triumfetta pentandra A.Rich.
- Triumfetta persimilis Lay
- Triumfetta pilosa Roth
- Triumfetta plumigera F.Muell.
- Triumfetta polyandra Sessé & Moc. ex DC.
- Triumfetta procumbens G. Forst.
- Triumfetta propinqua Halford
- Triumfetta prostrata Halford
- Triumfetta purpusii Standl.
- Triumfetta pustulata Halford
- Triumfetta ramosa Sprague & Hutch
- Triumfetta reflexa W.Fitzg.
- Triumfetta repens (Blume) Merr. & Rolfe
- Triumfetta reticulata Wild
- Triumfetta rhodoneura K.Schum.
- Triumfetta rhomboidea Jacq.
- Triumfetta rotundifolia Lam.
- Triumfetta rubiginosa Halford
- Triumfetta rupestris Halford
- Triumfetta ryeae Halford
- Triumfetta saccata Halford
- Triumfetta sampaioi Monteiro
- Triumfetta scandens K.Schum.
- Triumfetta semitriloba Jacq.
- Triumfetta sericata Lay.
- Triumfetta setulosa Mast.
- Triumfetta shinyangensis Verdc.
- Triumfetta simplicifolia (Sessé & Moc.) Fryxell
- Triumfetta simulans Halford
- Triumfetta socorrensis Brandegee
- Triumfetta sonderi Ficalho & Hiern
- Triumfetta speciosa Seem.
- Triumfetta stellata Lay
- Triumfetta suffruticosa Blume
- Triumfetta sylvicola Halford
- Triumfetta tenuipedunculata Wild
- Triumfetta tenuiseta Halford
- Triumfetta tomentosa Bojer
- Triumfetta trachystema K.Schum.
- Triumfetta triandra Sprague & Hutch.
- Triumfetta trichocarpa Hochst. ex A. Rich.
- Triumfetta trifida Sprague & Hutch.
- Triumfetta trigona Sprague & Hutch.
- Triumfetta trisecta Halford
- Triumfetta villosiuscula Blume
- Triumfetta viridis Halford
- Triumfetta welwitschii Mast.
- Triumfetta winneckeana F.Muell.
- Triumfetta youngii Exell & Mendonça
