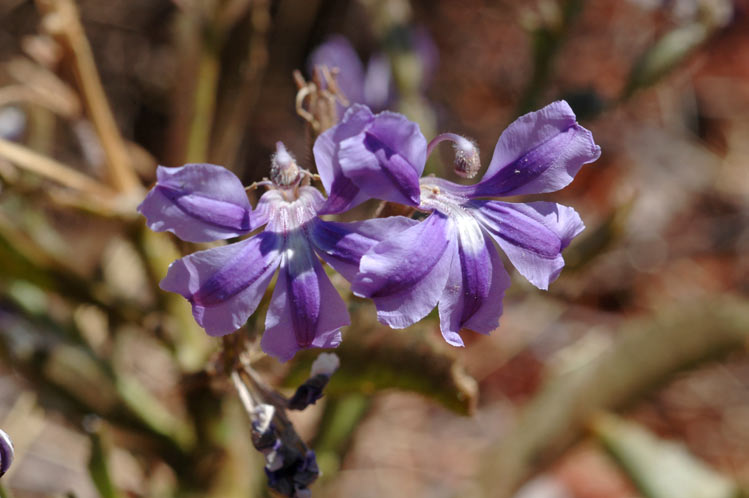
- Near Newman

Scientific classification
- Kingdom: Plantae
- Clade: Tracheophytes
- Clade: Angiosperms
- Clade: Eudicots
- Clade: Asterids
- Order: Asterales
- Family: Goodeniaceae
- Genus: Goodenia
- Species: G. stobbsiana

Binomial name
- Goodenia stobbsiana F.Muell.

Synonyms
- Goodenia clementii K.Krause; Goodenia scaevolina subsp. 'A'; Goodenia scaevolina subsp. 'A Kimberley Flora'; Goodenia scaevolina subsp. 'A Kimberley Flora' (C.A.Gardner 6299) WA Herbarium; Goodenia stapfiana K.Krause

= Goodenia stobbsiana =

Species of flowering plant

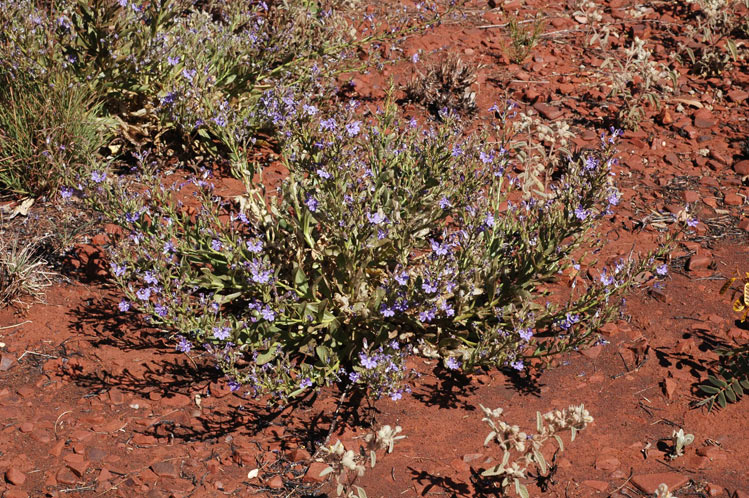
Habit in Karijini National Park

Goodenia stobbsiana is a species of flowering plant in the family Goodeniaceae and is endemic to the north-west of Western Australia. It is a sticky, much-branched, perennial subshrub with egg-shaped to lance-shaped leaves with the narrower end towards the base and thyrses of blue flowers.

== Description ==
Goodenia stobbsiana is a much-branched perennial subshrub that typically grows to a height of up to 80 cm (31 in) with sticky foliage. The leaves at the base of the plant and on the stems are egg-shaped to lance-shaped with the narrower end towards the base, 40–70 mm (1.6–2.8 in) long and 20–30 mm (0.79–1.18 in) wide, sometimes with teeth on the edges. The flowers are arranged in loose thyrses up to 400 mm (16 in) long on a peduncle up to 50 mm (2.0 in) long with leaf-like bracts and linear bracteoles up to 10 mm (0.39 in) long, each flower on a pedicel up to 4 mm (0.16 in) long. The corolla is blue with lobes up to 14 mm (0.55 in) long. Flowering mainly occurs from March to October.

== Taxonomy and naming ==
Goodenia stobbsiana was first formally described in 1878 by Ferdinand von Mueller in Fragmenta phytographiae Australiae from specimens collected by John Forrest. The specific epithet (stobbsiana) honours Johns Stobbs (184–1882), a Presbyterian minister who assisted von Mueller.

== Distribution ==
This goodenia grows in stony soil, often in disturbed or burned areas, mainly in the Pilbara region of north-western Australia.

== Conservation status ==
Goodenia stobbsiana is classified as "not threatened" by the Government of Western Australia Department of Parks and Wildlife.
