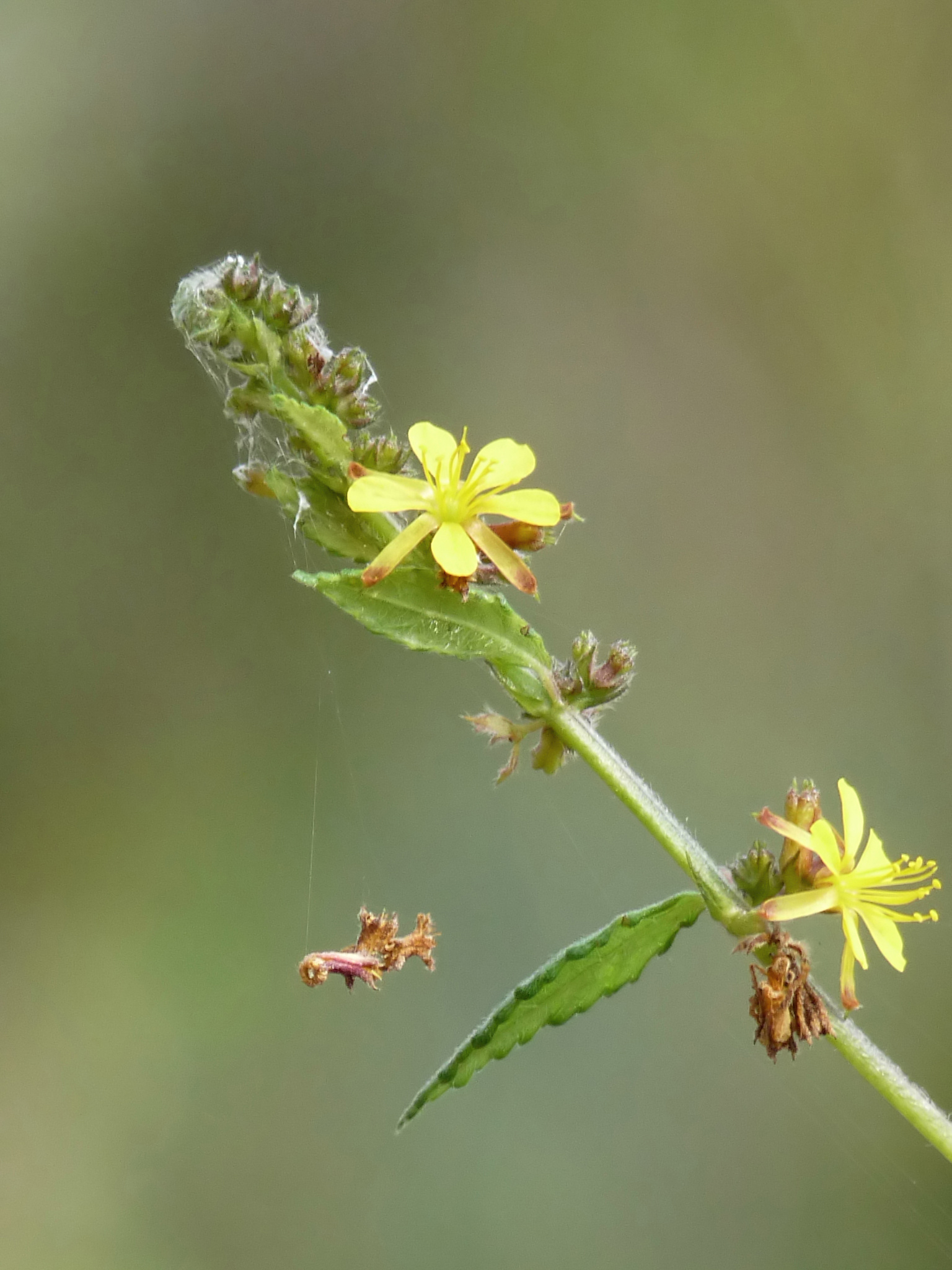
- Flowering plant in Kerala, Indi

Scientific classification
- Kingdom: Plantae
- Clade: Tracheophytes
- Clade: Angiosperms
- Clade: Eudicots
- Clade: Rosids
- Order: Malvales
- Family: Malvaceae
- Genus: Triumfetta
- Species: T. rhomboidea

Binomial name
- Triumfetta rhomboidea Jacq.

= Triumfetta rhomboidea =

Species of shrub

Triumfetta rhomboidea, commonly known as diamond burbark, Chinese bur, or kulutkulutan in Tagalog, is a shrub that is extensively naturalised in tropical regions. It is thought that to have come to Australia from China. Its bark—sometimes called burbark—makes a kind of jute.

The taxon was first formally described in 1760 by botanist Nikolaus von Jacquin.

== Description ==
Various sources give the number of stamens as being between 8 and 15. The fruit is round to slightly ovoid and about 6 millimetres (0.2 in) in diameter with smooth spines which are about 2 millimetres (0.1 in) long. The stems are covered in star-shaped (stellate) hairs. Its embryology was described by Venkata Rao in 1952.
