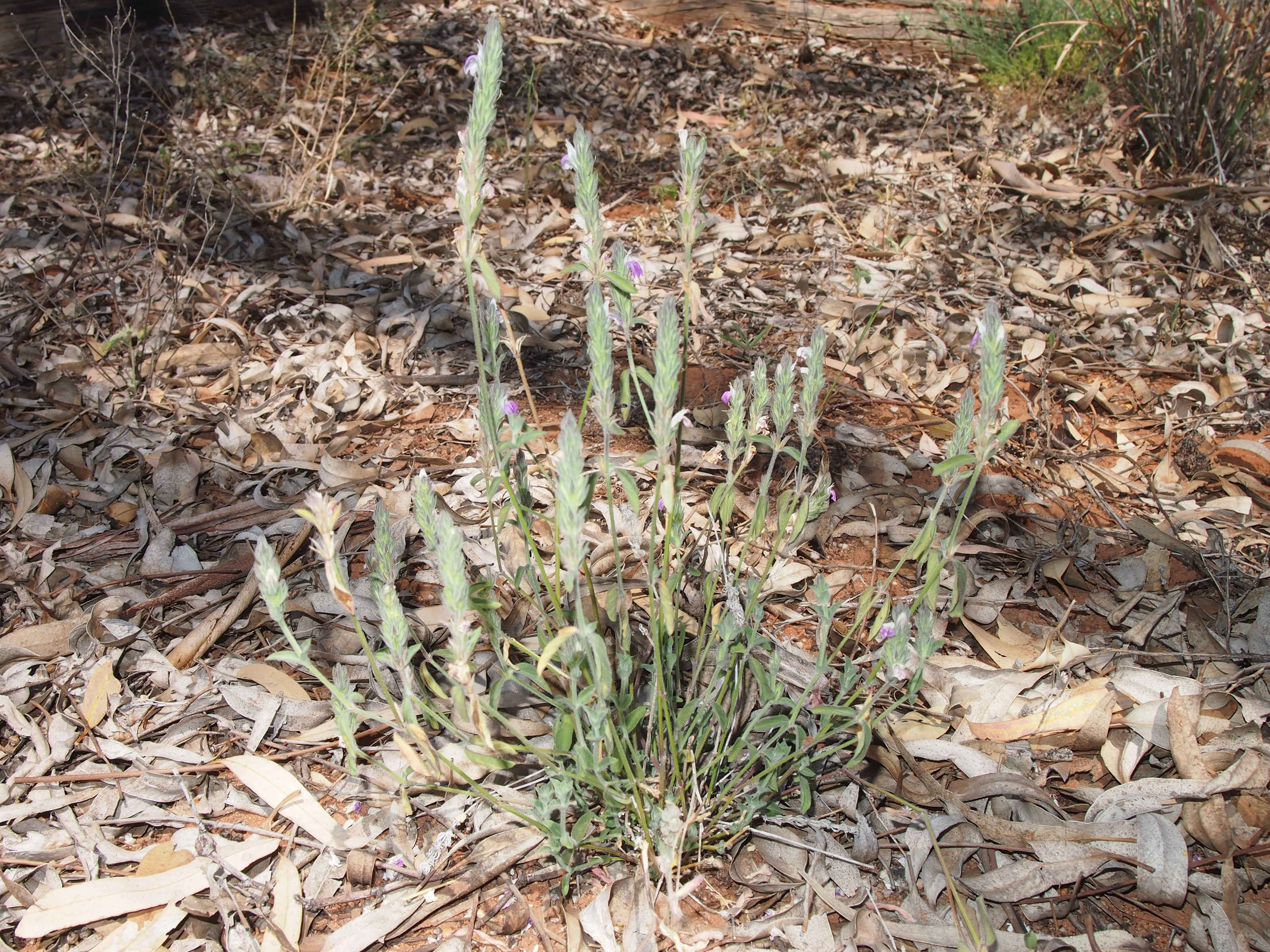

Scientific classification
- Kingdom: Plantae
- Clade: Tracheophytes
- Clade: Angiosperms
- Clade: Eudicots
- Clade: Asterids
- Order: Lamiales
- Family: Acanthaceae
- Genus: Rostellularia
- Species: R. adscendens

Binomial name
- Rostellularia adscendens (R.Br.) R.M.Barker

Synonyms
- Justicia adscendens R.Br.

= Rostellularia adscendens =

Species of plant

Rostellularia adscendens is an Australian plant species in the family Acanthaceae. It grows to between 10 and 50 cm high.

It occurs along streams or in rocky areas in woodland in Western Australia, the Northern Territory, South Australia, New South Wales and Queensland. The taxon was first formally described by botanist Robert Brown in 1810 in Prodromus Florae Novae Hollandiae. He gave it the name Justicia adscendens. The species was transferred to the genus Rostellularia in 1986 by R.M. Barker.

Subspecies and varieties include

- Rostellularia adscendens (R.Br.) R.M.Barker var. adscendens
- Rostellularia adscendens var. clementii (Domin) R.M.Barker
- Rostellularia adscendens subsp. dallachyi R.M.Barker
- Rostellularia adscendens subsp. glaucoviolacea (Domin) R.M.Barker
- Rostellularia adscendens var. hispida (Domin) R.M.Barker
- Rostellularia adscendens var. juncea (R.Br.) R.M.Barker
- Rostellularia adscendens var. largiflorens R.M.Barker
- Rostellularia adscendens var. latifolia (Domin) R.M.Barker
- Rostellularia adscendens var. pogonanthera (F.Muell.) R.M.Barker

== Gallery ==
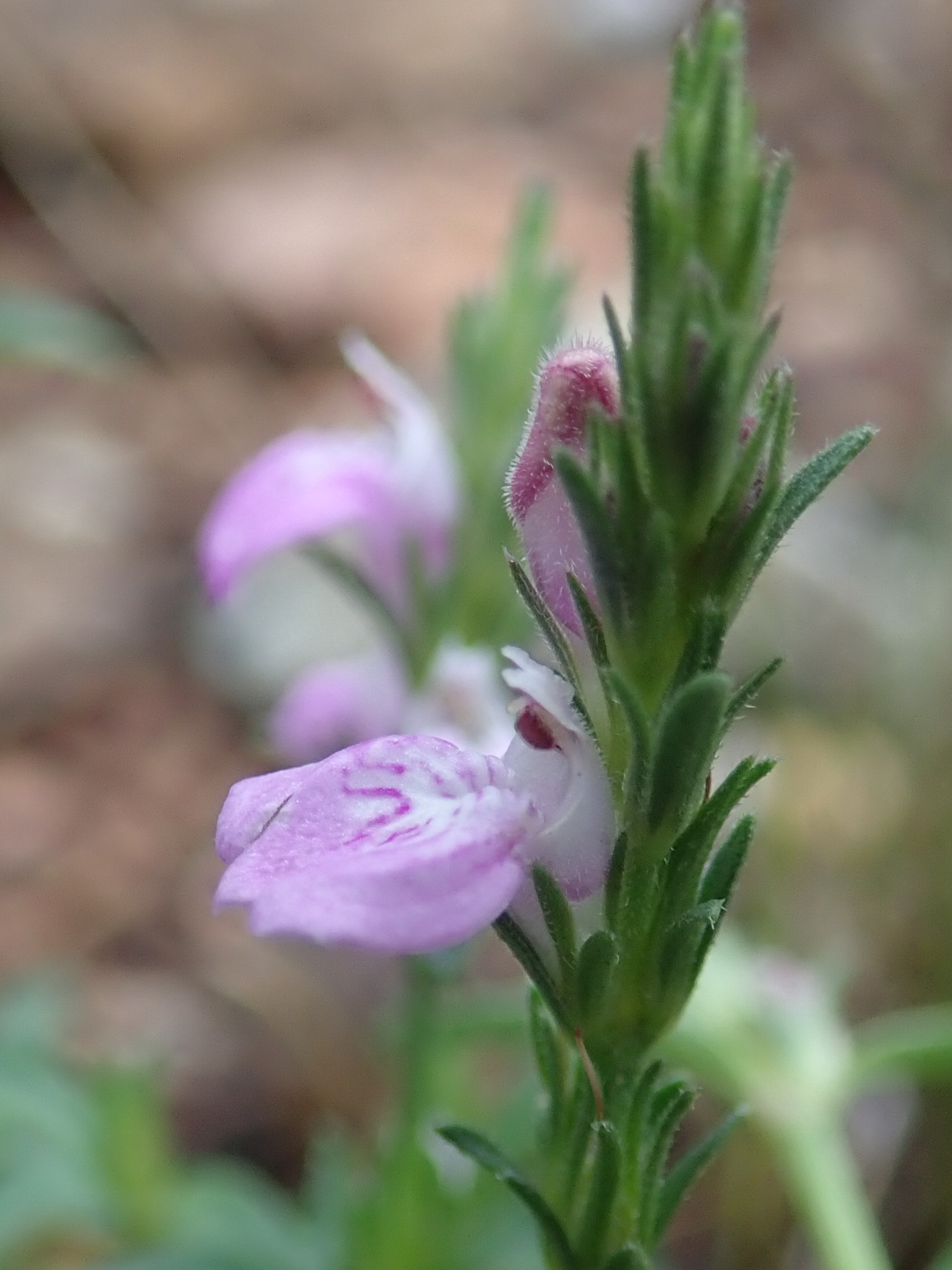

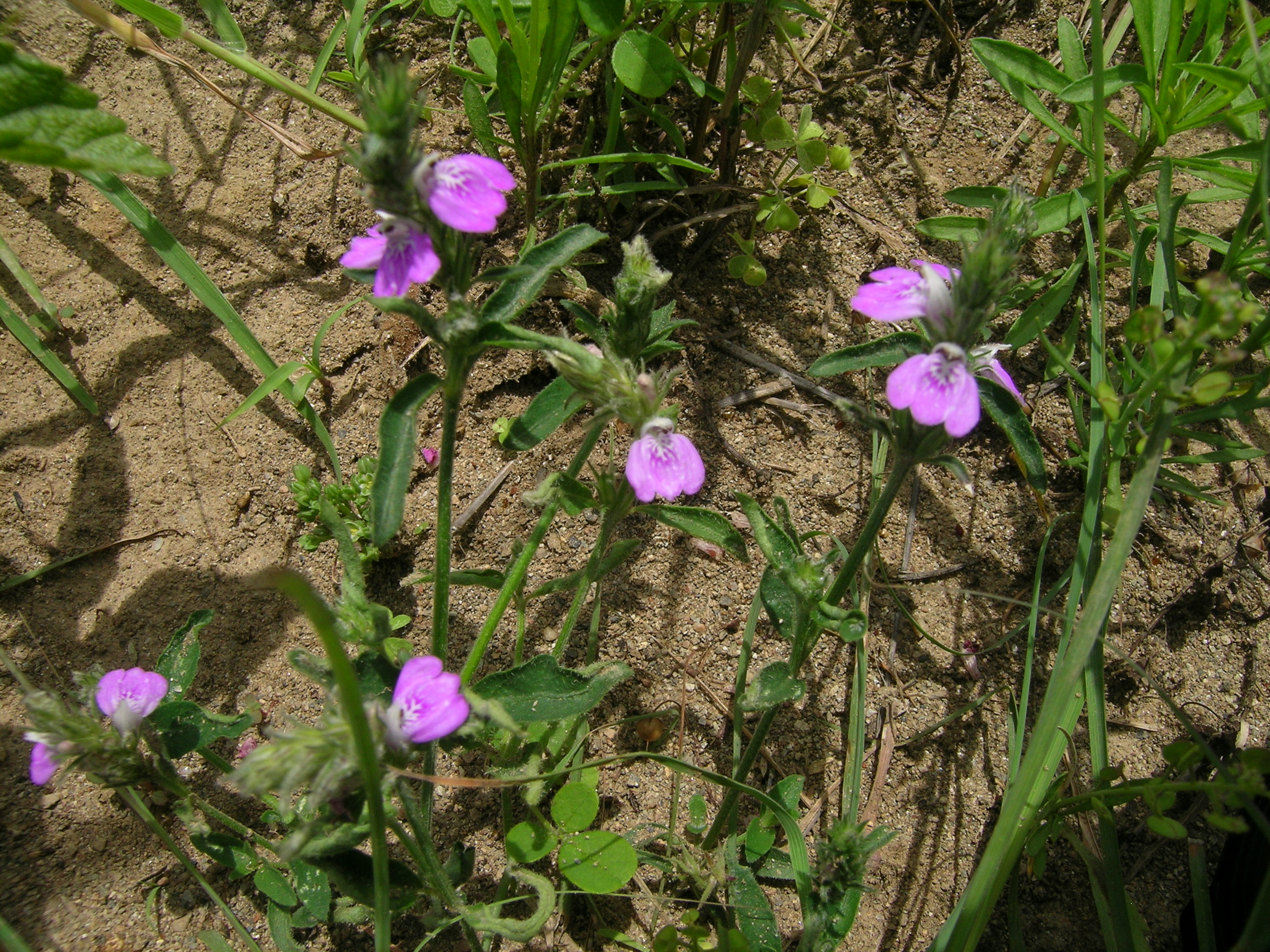

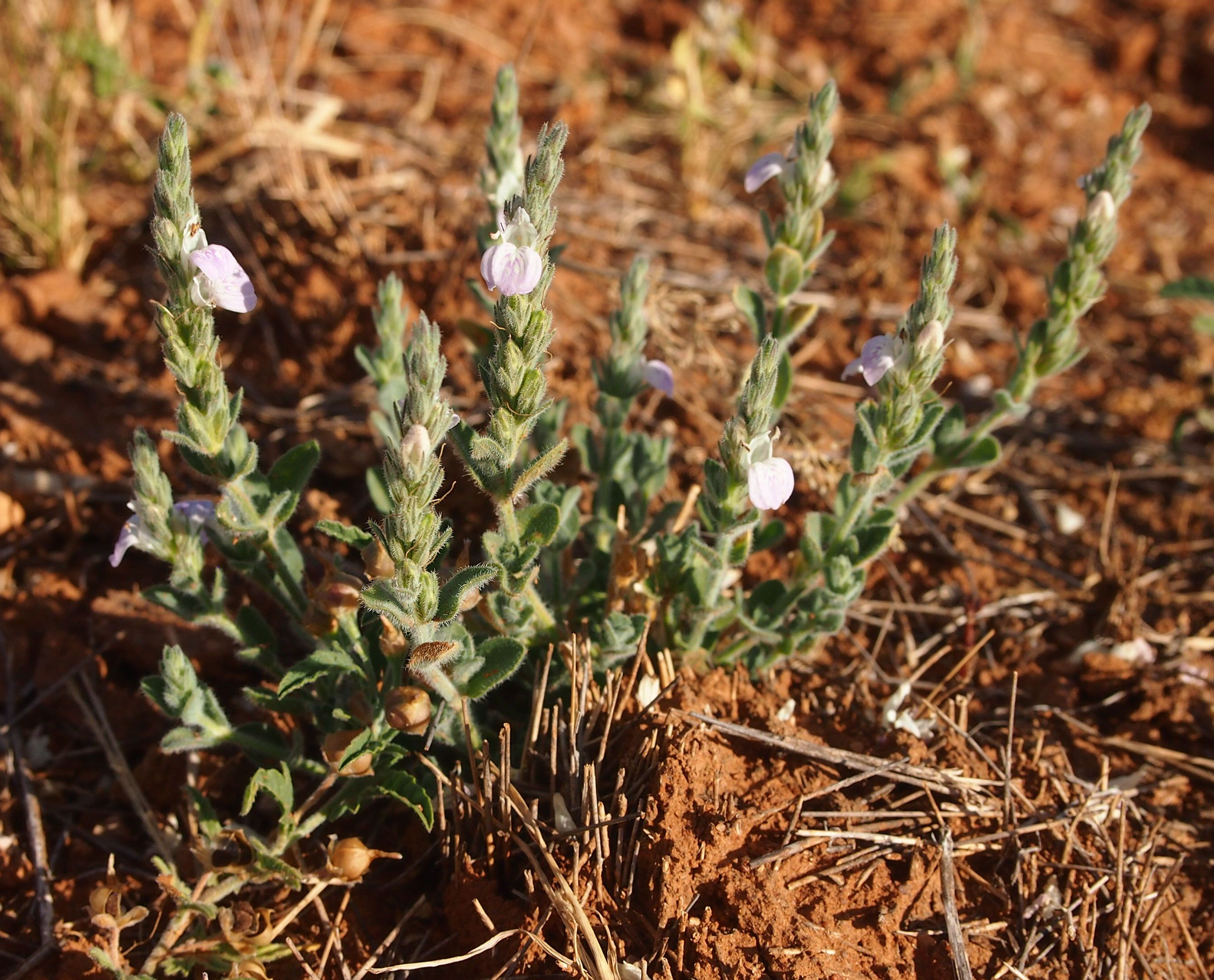
