= Leo Farmar =

British botanist (1878–1907)

- Born: 20 February 1878; Dover
- Died: 6 April 1907 (aged 29); Southsea
- Scientific career
- Fields: Botany
- Author abbrev. (botany): Farmar

Leopold Farmar (1878–1907) was a British botanist.

In 1893 Leo Farmar obtained certificates in book-keeping and arithmetic from the Society of Arts Polytechnic Centre in Dover.

He had been at Manchester and Glasnevin Botanic Gardens before entering Kew as a gardener in March 1903. Being almost immediately transferred to the Herbarium, he remained there until January 1, 1906, then joining an expedition to West Africa ...

Farmar was the botanist for the First West African Expedition of Liverpool University's Institute of Commercial Research in the Tropics. The expedition was conducted from 6 January to 5 June 1906. Its purpose was to "study problems connected with rubber, cocoa, fibre, and maize." The expedition visited Senegal, French Guinea, Sierra Leone, Liberia, the Ivory Coast and the Gold Coast. Toward the end of the expedition, Farmar's febrile illness caused changes to some of the scheduled visits. He collected and mounted nearly 800 botanical specimens.

In 1906 Eric Drabble and Farmar were the two members of the economic botany section of the scientific staff of Liverpool University's Institute of Commercial Research in the Tropics.

In January 1907 Farmar became re-employed as a temporary assistant in the Herbarium at Kew, but shortly before his death he resigned from Kew to work for Henry John Elwes and Augustine Henry. He committed suicide in April 1907. He was to have joined Sir Alfred Lewis Jones's expedition to Africa for the purpose of investigating the possibilities for growing cotton there.

== Selected publications ==
- "A Journey in West Africa". Journal of the Kew Guild. 2 (14): 324–326. 1906. (Farmar's short summary of the expedition to West Africa)
- with William de Montmorency, 6th Viscount Mountmorres: "Botanic Gardens at Konakry, French Guinea". Quarterly Journal of the Institute of Commercial Research in the Tropics, Liverpool University: 161–166. April 1907. (Viscount Mountmorres and Leo Farmar's detailed description of the Botanic Gardens' layout and plants)
