= List of butterflies of Saudi Arabia =

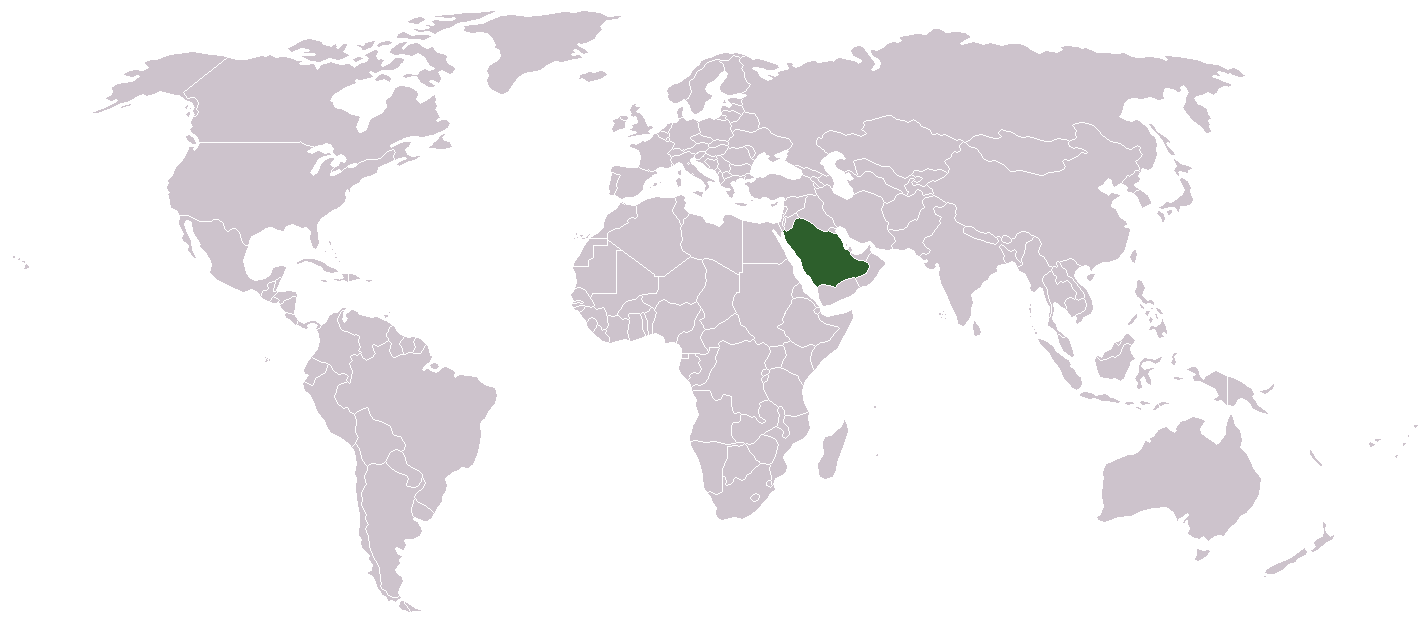
Location of Saudi Arabia

This is a list of butterflies of Saudi Arabia. About 79 species are known from Saudi Arabia.

== Papilionidae ==
=== Papilioninae ===
==== Papilionini ====
- Papilio demodocus demodocus Esper, [1798]
- Papilio demoleus demoleus Linnaeus, 1758
- Papilio machaon syriacus Verity, 1908
- Papilio saharae rathjensi Warnecke, 1932
- Papilio saharae saharae Oberthür, 1879

== Pieridae ==
=== Coliadinae ===
- Catopsilia florella (Fabricius, 1775)
- Colias croceus (Geoffroy, 1785) = Colias crocea
- Colias electo meneliki Berger, 1940
- Colias erate marnoana Rogenhofer, 1884
- Eurema brigitta brigitta (Stoll, [1780])
- Eurema hecabe solifera (Butler, 1875)

=== Pierinae ===
Teracolini

- Colotis amata calais (Cramer, 1775)
- Colotis phisadia (Godart, 1819) incl. Colotis phisadia phisadia (Godart, 1819)
- Colotis chrysonome (Klug, 1829) incl. Colotis chrysonome chrysonome (Klug, 1829)
- Colotis evarne (Klug, 1829) = Colotis aurora evarne (Klug, 1829) also mentioned as Colotis eucharis evarne
- Colotis fausta vi (Swinhoe, 1884)
- Colotis fausta fausta (Olivier, 1804)
- Colotis antevippe zera (Lucas, 1852)
- Colotis daira daira (Klug, 1829)
- Colotis danae eupompe (Klug, 1829)
- Colotis ephyia (Klug, 1829)
- Colotis euippe exole (Reiche, 1850)
- Colotis evippe epigone (Felder, 1865)
- Colotis evagore evagore (Klug, 1829)
- Colotis halimede halimede (Klug, 1829)
- Colotis liagore (Klug, 1829)
- Colotis pleione pleione (Klug, 1829)
- Colotis protomedia (Klug, 1829)
- Colotis ungemachi (Le Cerf, 1922)
- Calopieris eulimene (Klug, 1829)
- Teracolus eris contractus Gabriel, 1954 = Colotis eris contractus
- Pinacopteryx eriphia tritogenia (Klug, 1829)
- Pieris rapae iranica Le Cerf, 1913
- Pieris rapae leucosoma Schawerda, 1905

Nepheroniini

- Nepheronia buquetii buchanani (Rothschild, 1921)
- Euchloe aegyptiaca Verity, 1911 = Euchloe melanochloros aegyptiaca Verity, 1911
- Euchloe belemia belemia Esper, 1799
- Euchloe falloui falloui (Allard, 1867)
- Euchloe falloui saudi Larsen, 1983
- Elphinstonia charlonia charlonia (Donzel, 1842)
- Zegris eupheme larseni Pittaway, 1986

==== Pierini ====
- Mylothris arabicus Gabriel, 1954
- Belenois aurota (Fabricius, 1793)
- Belenois gidica (Godart, 1819)
- Belenois creona leucogyne Butler, 1885
- Pontia daplidice daplidice (Linnaeus, 1758)
- Pontia glauconome glauconome (Klug, 1829)

== Lycaenidae ==
Aphnaeinae

- Axiocerces harpax kadugli Talbot, 1935
- Chloroselas esmeralda bilqis Larsen, 1983

=== Theclinae ===
Amblypodiini

- Myrina silenus nzoiae d'Abrera, 1980

==== Hypolycaenini ====
- Hypolycaena pachalica Butler, 1888
- Hypolycaena philippus (Fabricius, 1793)

Theclini

- Iolaus glaucus Butler, 1886
- Iolaus nursei Butler, 1896

Deudorigini

- Deudorix antalus (Hopffer, 1855)
- Deudorix dinochares Smith, 1887
- Deudorix livia (Klug, 1834)

=== Lycaeninae ===
- Lycaena phlaeas shima Gabriel, 1954

=== Polyommatinae ===
==== Lycaenesthini ====
- Anthene amarah (Guérin-Méneville, 1849)
- Anthene arora Larsen, 1983
- Anthene butleri arabicus Gabriel, 1954

==== Polyommatini ====
- Cacyreus virilis Stempffer, 1936
- Cupidopsis jobates (Hopffer, 1855)
- Leptotes pirithous (Linnaeus, 1767)
- Tuxentius gabrieli Balint, 1999
- Tarucus balkanicus (Freyer, 1843)
- Tarucus rosacea (Austaut, 1885)
- Tarucus theophrastus (Fabricius, 1793)
- Zizeeria karsandra (Moore, 1865)
- Zizina antanossa (Mabille, 1877)
- Zizula hylax (Fabricius, 1775)
- Azanus jesous (Guérin-Méneville, 1849)
- Azanus moriqua (Wallengren, 1857)
- Azanus ubaldus (Stoll, 1782)
- Pseudophilotes abencerragus nabataeus (Graves, 1925)
- Euchrysops lois (Butler, 1886)
- Euchrysops malathana (Boisduval, 1833)
- Euchrysops osiris (Hopffer, 1855)
- Euchrysops philbyi Gabriel, 1954
- Freyeria trochylus (Freyer, [1843])
- Chilades parrhasius (Fabricius, 1793)
- Plebejidea loewii uranicola (Walker, 1870)
- Kretania philbyi (Graves, 1925)
- Lampides boeticus (Linnaeus, 1767)
- Lepidochrysops forsskali Larsen, 1982
- Lepidochrysops haveni (Larsen, 1983)
- Lepidochrysops pittawayi Larsen, 1983
- Brephidium exilis (Boisduval, 1852)

== Nymphalidae ==
Libythea laius Trimen, 1879

Danainae

Danaus chrysippus (Linnaeus, 1758)

=== Satyrinae ===
==== Melanitini ====
- Melanitis leda (Linnaeus, 1758)

==== Satyrini ====
- Lasiommata felix (Warnecke, 1929)
- Ypthima asterope (Klug, 1832)
- Hipparchia tewfiki (Wiltshire, 1949)

Charaxini

- Charaxes hansali yemeni Turlin, 1998
- Charaxes bernstorffi Rydon, 1982

=== Nymphalinae ===
Nymphalini

- Vanessa cardui (Linnaeus, 1758)

Junoniini

- Junonia chorimene (Guérin-Méneville, 1844)
- Junonia hierta cebrene Trimen, 1870
- Junonia orithya here Lang, 1884
- Precis limnoria limnoria (Klug, 1845)
- Hypolimnas misippus (Linnaeus, 1764)
- Melitaea deserticola macromaculata Belter, 1934
- Melitaea persea sargon Hemming, 1932 (It must be compared to Melitaea acentria arabica)
- Protogoniomorpha anacardii nebulosa Trimen, 1881

=== Biblidinae ===
==== Biblidini ====
- Byblia anvatara acheloia (Wallengren, 1857)
- Byblia ilithyia (Drury, 1773)
- Eurytela dryope brittoni Gabriel, 1954

=== Limenitinae ===
==== Chalingini ====
- Hamanumida daedalus (Fabricius, 1775)

=== Heliconiinae ===
==== Acraeini ====
- Acraea chilo yemensis Le Doux, 1931
- Acraea neobule Doubleday, 1847
- Acraea doubledayi azvaki d'Abrera, 1980
- Acraea encedon rathjensi Le Doux, 1933 = Telechinia encedon rathjensi Le Doux, 1933
- Acraea serena (Fabricius, 1775) = Telechinia serena (Fabricius, 1775)

== Hesperiidae ==
- Caprona pillaana (Wallengren, 1857)

=== Pyrginae ===
==== Celaenorrhinini ====
- Sarangesa phidyle (Walker, 1870)

==== Carcharodini ====
- Spialia bifida (Higgins, 1924), previously known as Spialia zebra bifida
- Spialia colotes semiconfluens de Jong, 1978
- Spialia colotes torbenlarseni (Tshikolovets, 2022)
- Spialia doris (Walker, 1870)
- Spialia mafa higginsi Evans, 1937
- Spialia spio (Linnaeus, 1764)
- Gomalia elma (Trimen, 1862)

=== Hesperiinae ===
==== Baorini ====
- Borbo gemella (Mabille, 1884) = Larsenia gemella (Mabille, 1884)
- Borbo fatuellus (Hopffer, 1855)
- Borbo borbonica zelleri (Lederer, 1855) [? requires confirmation]
- Gegenes hottentota (Latreille, 1824)
- Gegenes nostrodamus (Fabricius, 1793)
- Gegenes pumilio (Hoffmansegg, 1804)
- Pelopidas mathias mathias (Fabricius, 1798)
- Pelopidas thrax thrax (Hübner, 1821)

== See also ==
- List of moths of Saudi Arabia
- Wildlife of Saudi Arabia
