= List of butterflies of Yemen =

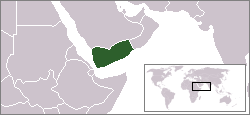
Location of Yemen

This is a list of butterflies of Yemen. About 117 species are known from Yemen.

== Papilionidae ==
=== Papilioninae ===
==== Papilionini ====
- Papilio saharae rathjensi Warnecke, 1932
- Papilio demodocus demodocus Esper, [1798]
- Papilio demodocus bennetti Dixey, 1898

== Pieridae ==
=== Coliadinae ===
- Eurema brigitta (Stoll, [1780])
- Colias marnoana Rogenhofer, 1884

=== Pierinae ===
- Colotis antevippe zera (Lucas, 1852)
- Colotis daira (Klug, 1829)
- Colotis ephyia (Klug, 1829)
- Colotis euippe exole (Reiche, 1850)
- Colotis evagore evagore (Klug, 1829)
- Colotis evagore niveus (Butler, 1881)
- Colotis protomedia (Klug, 1829)
- Colotis ungemachi (Le Cerf, 1922)
- Colotis eris contractus Gabriel, 1954
- Calopieris eulimene (Klug, 1829)
- Nepheronia buquetii buchanani (Rothschild, 1921)

==== Pierini ====
- Mylothris arabicus Gabriel, 1954
- Belenois anomala (Butler, 1881)
- Belenois creona leucogyne Butler, 1885

== Lycaenidae ==
=== Aphnaeinae ===
- Chloroselas arabica (Riley, 1932)
- Chloroselas esmeralda bilqis Larsen, 1983
- Cigaritis scotti (Gabriel, 1954)
- Cigaritis somalina (Butler, 1886)
- Axiocerses harpax kadugli Talbot, 1935

=== Theclinae ===
- Myrina silenus nzoiae d'Abrera, 1980
- Hypolycaena pachalica Butler, 1888
- Hypolycaena philippus (Fabricius, 1793)
- Iolaus glaucus Butler, 1886
- Iolaus nursei Butler, 1896
- Deudorix antalus (Hopffer, 1855)
- Deudorix dinochares Grose-Smith, 1887
- Deudorix livia (Klug, 1834)

=== Lycaeninae ===
- Lycaena phlaeas shima Gabriel, 1954

=== Polyommatinae ===
==== Lycaenesthini ====
- Anthene amarah (Guérin-Méneville, 1849)
- Anthene arora Larsen, 1983
- Anthene butleri arabicus Gabriel, 1954
- Anthene contrastata (Ungemach, 1932)

==== Polyommatini ====
- Cupidopsis jobates (Hopffer, 1855)
- Cacyreus niebuhri Larsen, 1982
- Cacyreus virilis Stempffer, 1936
- Leptotes babaulti (Stempffer, 1935)
- Leptotes brevidentatus (Tite, 1958)
- Leptotes jeanneli (Stempffer, 1935)
- Leptotes pirithous (Linnaeus, 1767)
- Leptotes socotranus (Ogilvie-Grant, 1899)
- Tuxentius gabrieli Balint, 1999
- Tarucus grammicus (Grose-Smith & Kirby, 1893)
- Tarucus quadratus Ogilvie-Grant, 1899
- Tarucus rosacea (Austaut, 1885)
- Tarucus theophrastus (Fabricius, 1793)
- Zizeeria karsandra (Moore, 1865)
- Zizina antanossa (Mabille, 1877)
- Actizera lucida (Trimen, 1883)
- Zizula hylax (Fabricius, 1775)
- Azanus mirza (Plötz, 1880)
- Azanus moriqua (Wallengren, 1857)
- Azanus ubaldus (Stoll, 1782)
- Eicochrysops distractus (de Joannis & Verity, 1913)
- Euchrysops lois (Butler, 1886)
- Euchrysops malathana (Boisduval, 1833)
- Euchrysops osiris (Hopffer, 1855)
- Euchrysops philbyi Gabriel, 1954
- Chilades parrhasius (Fabricius, 1793)
- Lepidochrysops arabicus Gabriel, 1954
- Lepidochrysops forsskali Larsen, 1982
- Lepidochrysops haveni Larsen, 1983

== Nymphalidae ==
=== Danainae ===
==== Danaini ====
- Danaus chrysippus alcippus (Cramer, 1777)

=== Satyrinae ===
==== Melanitini ====
- Melanitis leda (Linnaeus, 1758)

==== Satyrini ====
- Lasiommata felix (Warnecke, 1929)
- Bicyclus anynana socotrana (Butler, 1881)
- Ypthima asterope (Klug, 1832)
- Hipparchia tewfiki (Wiltshire, 1949)

=== Charaxinae ===
==== Charaxini ====
- Charaxes varanes bertrami Riley, 1931
- Charaxes varanes torbeni Turlin, 1999
- Charaxes balfouri Butler, 1881
- Charaxes velox Ogilvie-Grant, 1899
- Charaxes hansali yemeni Turlin, 1998
- Charaxes bernstorffi Rydon, 1982

=== Nymphalinae ===
==== Nymphalini ====
- Junonia chorimene (Guérin-Méneville, 1844)
- Junonia hierta cebrene Trimen, 1870
- Junonia oenone (Linnaeus, 1758)
- Junonia orithya here Lang, 1884
- Protogoniomorpha anacardii (Trimen, 1881)
- Precis limnoria (Klug, 1845)
- Hypolimnas bolina jacintha (Drury, [1773])
- Hypolimnas misippus (Linnaeus, 1764)
- Melitaea deserticola scotti Higgins, 1941

=== Biblidinae ===
==== Biblidini ====
- Byblia anvatara acheloia (Wallengren, 1857)
- Byblia anvatara boydi Dixey, 1898
- Byblia ilithyia (Drury, 1773)
- Eurytela dryope brittoni Gabriel, 1954

=== Limenitinae ===
==== Neptidini ====
- Neptis serena annah Larsen, 1982

==== Adoliadini ====
- Hamanumida daedalus (Fabricius, 1775)

=== Heliconiinae ===
==== Acraeini ====
- Acraea chilo yemensis Le Doux, 1931
- Acraea neobule Doubleday, 1847
- Acraea doubledayi azvaki d'Abrera, 1980
- Acraea encedon rathjensi Le Doux, 1933
- Acraea serena (Fabricius, 1775)

==== Vagrantini ====
- Phalanta phalantha granti (Rothschild & Jordan, 1903)

== Hesperiidae ==
=== Coeliadinae ===
- Coeliades anchises jucunda (Butler, 1881)

=== Pyrginae ===
==== Celaenorrhinini ====
- Sarangesa phidyle (Walker, 1870)

==== Tagiadini ====
- Caprona pillaana Wallengren, 1857

==== Carcharodini ====
- Spialia colotes semiconfluens de Jong, 1978
- Spialia diomus (Hopffer, 1855)
- Spialia doris (Walker, 1870)
- Spialia mafa higginsi Evans, 1937
- Spialia mangana (Rebel, 1899)
- Spialia spio (Linnaeus, 1764)
- Spialia zebra bifida (Higgins, 1924)
- Carcharodus alceae wissmanni Warnecke, 1934
- Gomalia elma (Trimen, 1862)

=== Hesperiinae ===
==== Baorini ====
- Borbo fatuellus (Hopffer, 1855)
- Borbo gemella (Mabille, 1884)
- Gegenes hottentota (Latreille, 1824)
- Gegenes nostrodamus (Fabricius, 1793)
- Gegenes pumilio pumilio (Hoffmansegg, 1804)
- Gegenes pumilio monochroa (Rebel, 1907)

== See also ==
- List of moths of Yemen
- Wildlife of Yemen
