= List of butterflies of Oman =

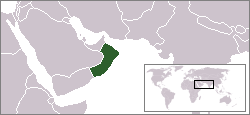
Location of Oman

This is a list of butterflies of Oman. About 53 species are known from Oman.

== Papilionidae ==
=== Papilioninae ===
==== Papilionini ====
- Papilio machaon muetingi Seyer, 1976
- Papilio demoleus Linnaeus, 1758

== Pieridae ==
=== Pierinae ===
- Colotis antevippe zera (Lucas, 1852)
- Colotis daira (Klug, 1829)
- Colotis eris contractus Gabriel, 1954
- Pinacopterix eriphia tritogenia (Klug, 1829)
- Euchloe charlonia amseli Gross & Ebert, 1975

==== Pierini ====
- Pieris krueperi Staudinger, 1860

== Lycaenidae ==
=== Aphnaeinae ===
- Chloroselas esmeralda bilqis Larsen, 1983
- Cigaritis myrmecophila Dumont, 1922
- Cigaritis scotti (Gabriel, 1954)
- Axiocerses harpax kadugli Talbot, 1935

=== Theclinae ===
- Myrina silenus nzoiae d'Abrera, 1980
- Iolaus glaucus Butler, 1886
- Deudorix livia livia (Klug, 1834)
- Deudorix livia barnetti Libert, 2005

=== Polyommatinae ===
==== Lycaenesthini ====
- Anthene amarah (Guérin-Méneville, 1849)

==== Polyommatini ====
- Cacyreus virilis Stempffer, 1936
- Leptotes pirithous (Linnaeus, 1767)
- Tarucus balkanicus (Freyer, 1843)
- Tarucus rosacea (Austaut, 1885)
- Tarucus theophrastus (Fabricius, 1793)
- Zizeeria karsandra (Moore, 1865)
- Zizula hylax (Fabricius, 1775)
- Azanus moriqua (Wallengren, 1857)
- Azanus ubaldus (Stoll, 1782)
- Pseudophilotes vicrama clara (Christoph, 1887)
- Euchrysops lois (Butler, 1886)
- Euchrysops osiris (Hopffer, 1855)
- Chilades parrhasius (Fabricius, 1793)
- Plebejidea loewii uranicola (Walker, 1870)

== Nymphalidae ==
=== Danainae ===
==== Danaini ====
- Danaus chrysippus alcippus (Cramer, 1777)

=== Satyrinae ===
==== Melanitini ====
- Melanitis leda (Linnaeus, 1758)

==== Satyrini ====
- Ypthima asterope (Klug, 1832)
- Ypthima bolanica Marshall, 1883
- Hipparchia parisatis (Kollar, 1849)

=== Charaxinae ===
==== Charaxini ====
- Charaxes varanes bertrami Riley, 1931
- Charaxes hansali arabica Riley, 1931

=== Nymphalinae ===
==== Nymphalini ====
- Hypolimnas bolina jacintha (Drury, [1773])
- Hypolimnas misippus (Linnaeus, 1764)
- Melitaea deserticola scotti Higgins, 1941

=== Biblidinae ===
==== Biblidini ====
- Byblia ilithyia (Drury, 1773)

=== Heliconiinae ===
==== Acraeini ====
- Acraea neobule Doubleday, 1847

== Hesperiidae ==
=== Coeliadinae ===
- Coeliades anchises jucunda (Butler, 1881)

=== Pyrginae ===
==== Celaenorrhinini ====
- Sarangesa phidyle (Walker, 1870)

==== Carcharodini ====
- Spialia colotes semiconfluens de Jong, 1978
- Spialia doris (Walker, 1870)
- Spialia mafa higginsi Evans, 1937
- Spialia mangana (Rebel, 1899)
- Spialia zebra bifida (Higgins, 1924)
- Gomalia elma (Trimen, 1862)

=== Hesperiinae ===
==== Baorini ====
- Gegenes nostrodamus (Fabricius, 1793)
- Gegenes pumilio (Hoffmansegg, 1804)
