= List of butterflies of Jordan =

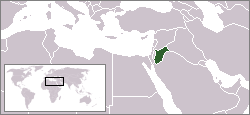
Location of Jordan

This is a list of butterflies of Jordan. About 81 species are known from Jordan.

== Hesperiidae ==
- Carcharodus stauderi:
  - Carcharodus stauderi ambiguus (Verity, 1925)
  - Carcharodus stauderi ramses Reverdin, 1914
- Gegenes nostrodamus nostrodamus (Fabricius, 1793)
- Gegenes pumilio pumilio (Hoffmannsegg, 1804)
- Muschampia proteides proteides (Wagner, 1929)
- Pelopidas thrax thrax (Hübner, [1821])
- Pyrgus melotis melotis (Duponchel, [1834])
- Spialia doris amenophis (Reverdin, 1914)
- Spialia orbifer hilaris (Staudinger, 1901)
- Thymelicus lineola lineola (Ochsenheimer, 1808)
- Thymelicus sylvestris syriacus (Tutt, [1905])

== Lycaenidae ==
- Anthene amarah amarah (Guerin-Meneville, 1849)
- Aricia agestis agestis ([Denis & Schiffermüller], 1775)
- Azanus jesous gamra (Lederer, 1855)
- Cigaritis acamas:
  - Cigaritis acamas acamas (Klug, 1834)
  - Cigaritis acamas egyptiaca (Riley, 1925)
- Cigaritis myrmecophila myrmecophila Dumont, 1922
- Deudorix livia livia (Klug, 1834)
- Freyeria trochylus trochylus (Freyer, [1843])
- Iolana alfierii alfierii Wiltshire, 1948
- Iolaus glaucus Butler, 1886
- Kretania nicholli cleopatra (Hemming, 1934)
- Kretania philbyi philbyi (Graves, 1925)
- Lampides boeticus boeticus (Linnaeus, 1767)
- Leptotes pirithous pirithous (Linnaeus, 1767)
- Luthrodes galba galba (Lederer, 1855)
- Lycaena phlaeas:
  - Lycaena phlaeas phlaeas (Linnaeus, 1761)
  - Lycaena phlaeas timeus (Cramer, [1777])
- Lycaena thersamon thersamon (Esper, [1784])
- Plebejidea loewii:
  - Plebejidea loewii lockarti (Hemming, 1929)
  - Plebejidea loewii uranicola (Walker, 1870)
- Pseudophilotes abencerragus nabataeus (Graves, 1925)
- Tarucus balkanicus balkanicus (Freyer, [1843])
- Tarucus rosacea rosacea (Austaut, 1885)
- Tomares nesimachus nesimachus (Oberthür, 1893)
- Zizeeria karsandra karsandra (Moore, 1865)

== Papilionidae ==
- Archon apollinus bellargus (Staudinger, [1892])
- Papilio alexanor judaeus Staudinger, [1894]
- Papilio machaon syriacus Pfeiffer, 1931
- Papilio saharae saharae Oberthür, 1879
- Zerynthia cerisyi cerisyi (Godart, 1822)
- Zerynthia deyrollei deyrollei (Oberthür, 1869)

== Pieridae ==
- Anaphaeis aurota aurota (Fabricius, 1793)
- Aporia crataegi augustior Graver, 1925
- Colotis chrysonome chrysonome (Klug, 1829)
- Colotis fausta fausta (Olivier, [1804])
- Colotis phisadia:
  - Colotis phisadia palaestinensis (Staudinger, [1898])
  - Colotis phisadia phisadia (Godart, [1819])
- Euchloe ausonia taurica Röber, [1907]
- Euchloe belemia:
  - Euchloe belemia belemia (Esper, [1800])
  - Euchloe belemia palaestinensis Röber, [1907]
- Euchloe charlonia charlonia (Donzel, 1842)
- Euchloe crameri aegyptiaca Verity, 1911
- Pieris brassicae brassicae (Linnaeus, 1758)
- Pieris pseudorapae pseudorapae Verity, 1908
- Pieris rapae rapae (Linnaeus, 1758)
- Pontia daplidice daplidice (Linnaeus, 1758)
- Pontia glauconome glauconome Klug, 1829
- Zegris eupheme:
  - Zegris eupheme tigris Riley, 1921
  - Zegris eupheme uarda Hemming, 1929

== Nymphalidae ==
=== Danainae ===
- Danaus chrysippus chrysippus (Linnaeus, 1758)

=== Charaxinae ===
- Charaxes jasius jasius (Linnaeus, 1767)

=== Limenitidinae ===
- Limenitis reducta herculeana Stichel, [1908]

=== Nymphalinae ===
- Melitaea arduinna evanescens Staudinger, 1886
- Melitaea deserticola macromaculata Belter, 1934
- Melitaea fascelis fascelis (Fabricius, 1787)
- Melitaea persea persea Kollar, [1849]
- Melitaea punica telona Fruhstorfer, 1908
- Polygonia egea egea Cramer, [1775])
- Vanessa atalanta atalanta (Linnaeus, 1758)
- Vanessa cardui cardui (Linnaeus, 1758)

=== Satyrinae ===
- Chazara anthe hanifa (Herrich-Schaeffer, 1850)
- Hipparchia fatua fatua (Freyer, 1844)
- Hyponephele lupina intermedia (Staudinger, 1886)
- Lasiommata megera transcaspica (Staudinger, 1901)
- Maniola telmessia telmessia (Zeller, 1847)
- Melanargia titea titania Calberla, 1891
- Pseudochazara pelopea pelopea (Klug, 1832)
- Pseudochazara telephassa telephassa (Geyer, [1827])
- Pseudotergumia pisidice pisidice (Klug, 1832)
- Ypthima asterope asterope (Klug, 1832)
