= Euchrysops nilotica =

Scientific classification
- Domain: Eukaryota
- Kingdom: Animalia
- Phylum: Arthropoda
- Class: Insecta
- Order: Lepidoptera
- Family: Lycaenidae
- Genus: Euchrysops
- Species: E. nilotica

Binomial name
- Euchrysops nilotica (Aurivillius, 1904)

Synonyms
- Cupido malathana var. nilotica Aurivillius, 1904

Species of butterfly

Euchrysops nilotica, the desert blue or milky bean Cupid, is a butterfly in the family Lycaenidae. It is found in Senegal, the Gambia, Burkina Faso, northern Nigeria, Niger, northern Cameroon, southern Sudan, Uganda, Ethiopia, Somalia and northern Kenya.— nilotica differs from the similar Euchrysops malathana in the light, softly greyish-blue or silvery grey colouring of the upper surface and in the paler under surface.

The habitat consists of arid Sudanian Savanna and the Sahel.
