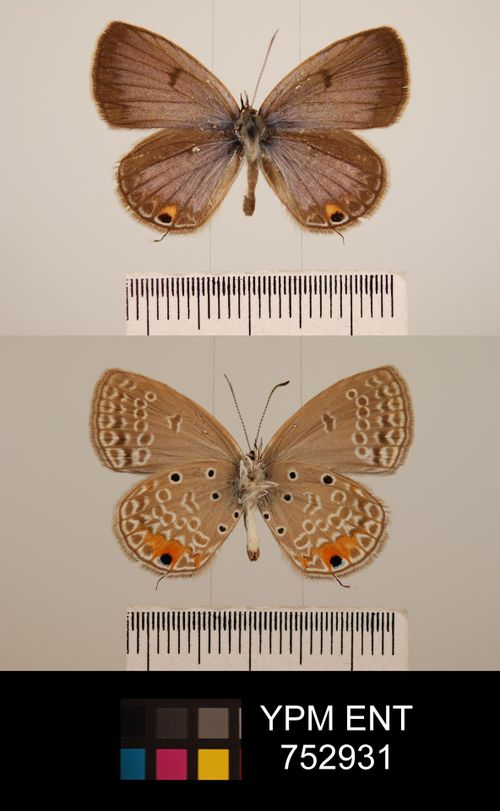

Scientific classification
- Kingdom: Animalia
- Phylum: Arthropoda
- Clade: Pancrustacea
- Class: Insecta
- Order: Lepidoptera
- Family: Lycaenidae
- Genus: Euchrysops
- Species: E. sahelianus

Binomial name
- Euchrysops sahelianus Libert, 2001

= Euchrysops sahelianus =

Species of butterfly

Euchrysops sahelianus, the western brown-edged Cupid, is a butterfly in the family Lycaenidae. It is found in Senegal (Basse Casamance), Burkina Faso, Mali, Sierra Leone, Ghana and northern Nigeria. The habitat consists of Sudan savanna and Guinea savanna with short grass. It is mainly found in rocky areas with short grass.

Torben Larsen developed a species numbering system for his 2005 publication Butterflies of West Africa. This species is #606. The 'Larsen' numbers have since been used with permission in A Sharp Eye on Butterflies of Ghana.
