= Euchrysops banyo =

Scientific classification
- Domain: Eukaryota
- Kingdom: Animalia
- Phylum: Arthropoda
- Class: Insecta
- Order: Lepidoptera
- Family: Lycaenidae
- Genus: Euchrysops
- Species: E. banyo

Binomial name
- Euchrysops banyo Libert, 2001

Species of butterfly

Euchrysops banyo, the Banyo Mountain Cupid, is a butterfly in the family Lycaenidae. It is found in Nigeria and Cameroon. The habitat consists of submontane grassland.
