= Euchrysops sagba =

Scientific classification
- Domain: Eukaryota
- Kingdom: Animalia
- Phylum: Arthropoda
- Class: Insecta
- Order: Lepidoptera
- Family: Lycaenidae
- Genus: Euchrysops
- Species: E. sagba

Binomial name
- Euchrysops sagba Libert, 1993

Synonyms
- Euchrysops unigemmata sagba Libert, 1993

Species of butterfly

Euchrysops sagba, the Sagba Mountain Cupid, is a butterfly in the family Lycaenidae. It is found in eastern Nigeria, Cameroon and the Central African Republic. The habitat consists of submontane grassland.
