= Euchrysops alberta =

Scientific classification
- Domain: Eukaryota
- Kingdom: Animalia
- Phylum: Arthropoda
- Class: Insecta
- Order: Lepidoptera
- Family: Lycaenidae
- Genus: Euchrysops
- Species: E. alberta

Binomial name
- Euchrysops alberta (Butler, 1901)

Synonyms
- Chilades alberta Butler, 1901

Species of butterfly

Euchrysops alberta, the Sahel Cupid, is a butterfly in the family Lycaenidae. It is found in north-western Nigeria, Sudan and northern Uganda.
