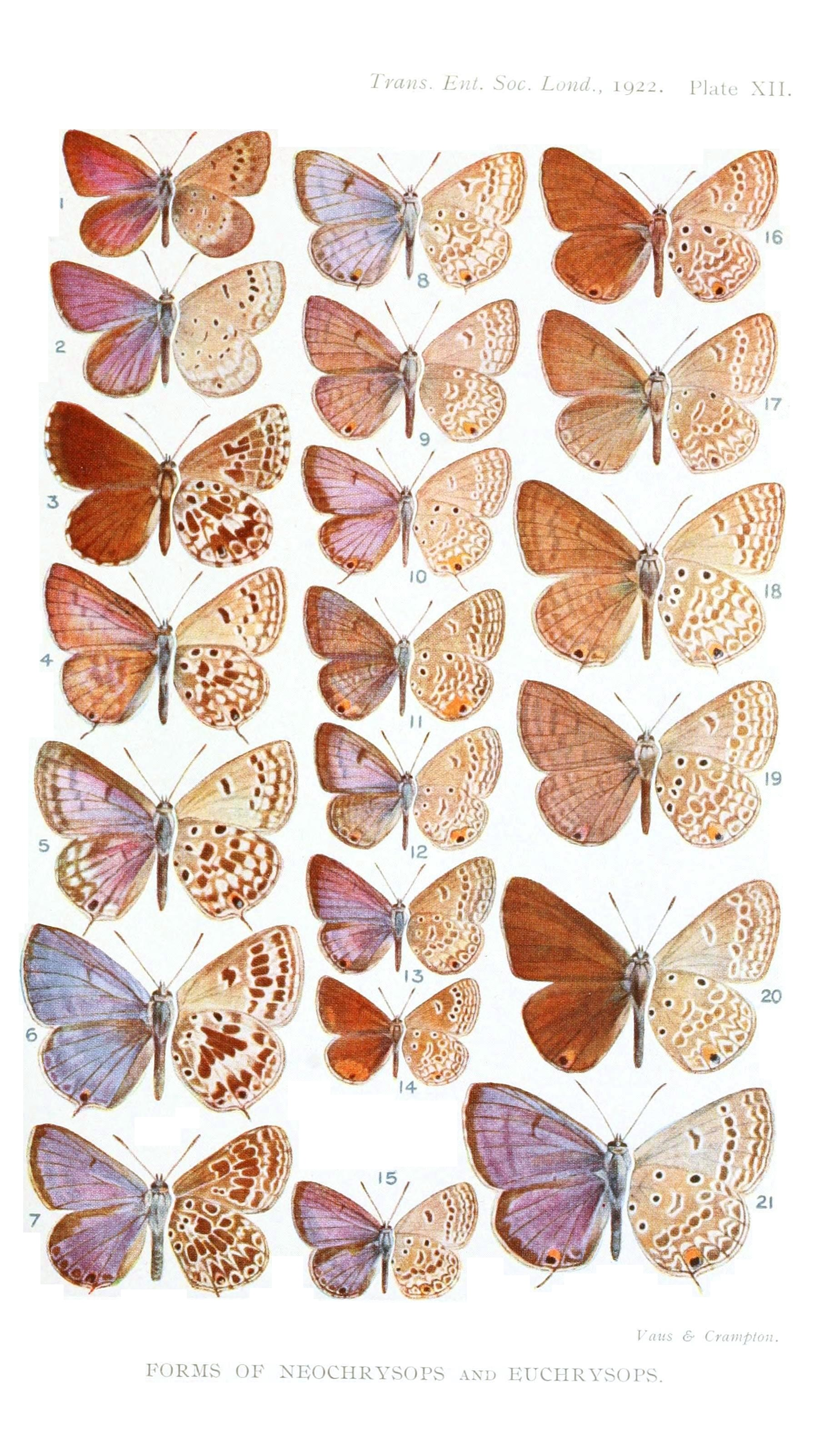
- Figure 15

Scientific classification
- Domain: Eukaryota
- Kingdom: Animalia
- Phylum: Arthropoda
- Class: Insecta
- Order: Lepidoptera
- Family: Lycaenidae
- Genus: Euchrysops
- Species: E. subpallida

Binomial name
- Euchrysops subpallida Bethune-Baker, 1923

Synonyms
- Euchrysops subpallida var. major Bethune-Baker, 1923; Euchrysops fescennia Hulstaert, 1924

= Euchrysops subpallida =

Species of butterfly

Euchrysops subpallida, the ashen smoky blue, is a butterfly of the family Lycaenidae. It is found in Kenya, from Tanzania to Malawi, Zambia, southern Zaire (Shaba), Zimbabwe and South Africa. In South Africa it is rare and only known from the northern part of the Limpopo province and northern KwaZulu-Natal.

The wingspan is 23–25 mm for males and 24–28 mm for females. Adults are on wing from September to February depending on rains. There is one generation per year.

The larvae probably feed on Ocimum species.
