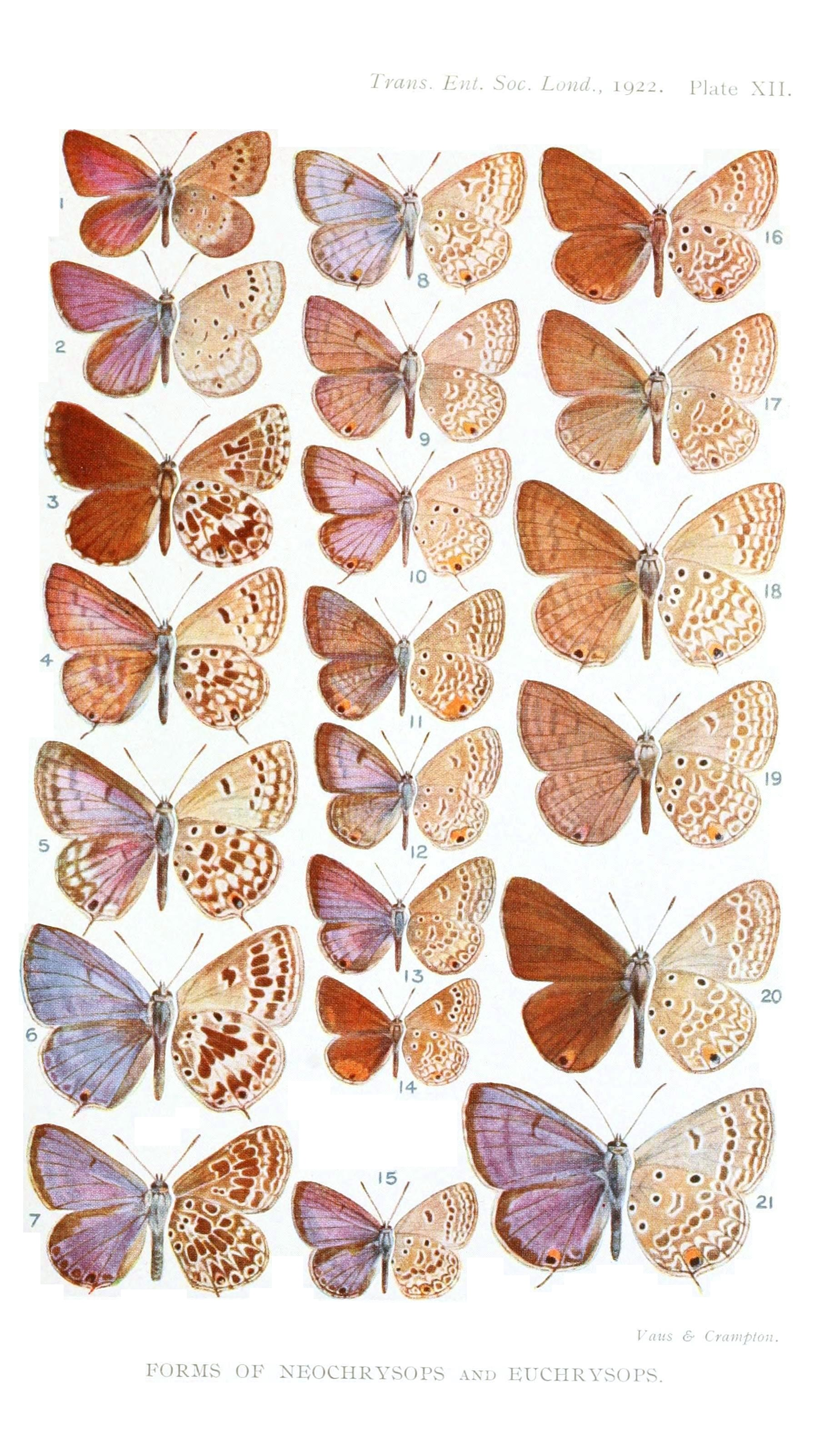
- Figure 11

Scientific classification
- Domain: Eukaryota
- Kingdom: Animalia
- Phylum: Arthropoda
- Class: Insecta
- Order: Lepidoptera
- Family: Lycaenidae
- Genus: Euchrysops
- Species: E. katangae

Binomial name
- Euchrysops katangae Bethune-Baker, 1923

= Euchrysops katangae =

Species of butterfly

Euchrysops katangae is a butterfly in the family Lycaenidae. It is found in Lualaba Province of the Democratic Republic of the Congo and Zambia.
