= Euchrysops abyssinica =

Scientific classification
- Kingdom: Animalia
- Phylum: Arthropoda
- Class: Insecta
- Order: Lepidoptera
- Family: Lycaenidae
- Genus: Euchrysops
- Species: E. abyssinica

Binomial name
- Euchrysops abyssinica (Aurivillius, 1922)

Synonyms
- Cupido abyssinica Aurivillius, 1922

Species of butterfly

Euchrysops abyssinica is a butterfly in the family Lycaenidae. It is found in Ethiopia.
