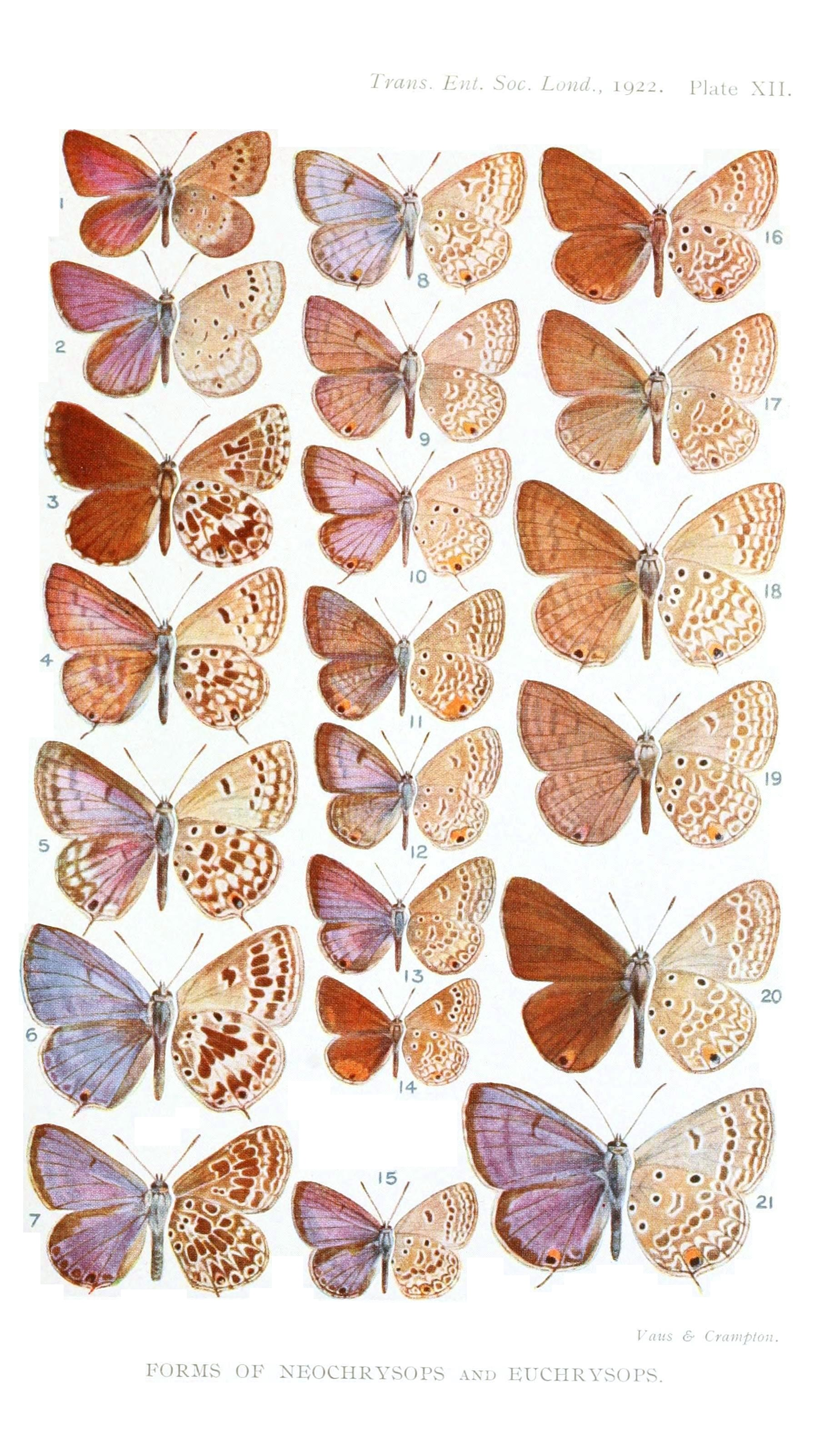
- Figure 13

Scientific classification
- Domain: Eukaryota
- Kingdom: Animalia
- Phylum: Arthropoda
- Class: Insecta
- Order: Lepidoptera
- Family: Lycaenidae
- Genus: Euchrysops
- Species: E. mauensis

Binomial name
- Euchrysops mauensis Bethune-Baker, 1923

= Euchrysops mauensis =

Species of butterfly

Euchrysops mauensis, the Mau blue, is a butterfly in the family Lycaenidae. It is found in Ethiopia, Kenya, Tanzania, Rwanda, Burundi and Kivu in the Democratic Republic of the Congo. The habitat consists of open grassland.

== Subspecies ==
- Euchrysops mauensis mauensis (Kenya: highlands west of the Rift Valley, northern Tanzania, Rwanda, Burundi, Democratic Republic of the Congo: Kivu)
- Euchrysops mauensis abyssiniae Storace, 1950 (Ethiopia)
