= Euchrysops unigemmata =

Scientific classification
- Domain: Eukaryota
- Kingdom: Animalia
- Phylum: Arthropoda
- Class: Insecta
- Order: Lepidoptera
- Family: Lycaenidae
- Genus: Euchrysops
- Species: E. unigemmata

Binomial name
- Euchrysops unigemmata (Butler, 1895)

Synonyms
- Zizera unigemmata Butler, 1895; Euchrysops browni Stempffer, 1954

Species of butterfly

Euchrysops unigemmata is a butterfly in the family Lycaenidae. It is found in Malawi, Zambia and possibly the Democratic Republic of the Congo. The habitat consists of montane areas.
