= Euchrysops decaryi =

Scientific classification
- Kingdom: Animalia
- Phylum: Arthropoda
- Clade: Pancrustacea
- Class: Insecta
- Order: Lepidoptera
- Family: Lycaenidae
- Genus: Euchrysops
- Species: E. decaryi

Binomial name
- Euchrysops decaryi Stempffer, 1947

Species of butterfly

Euchrysops decaryi is a butterfly in the family Lycaenidae. It is found on Madagascar.
