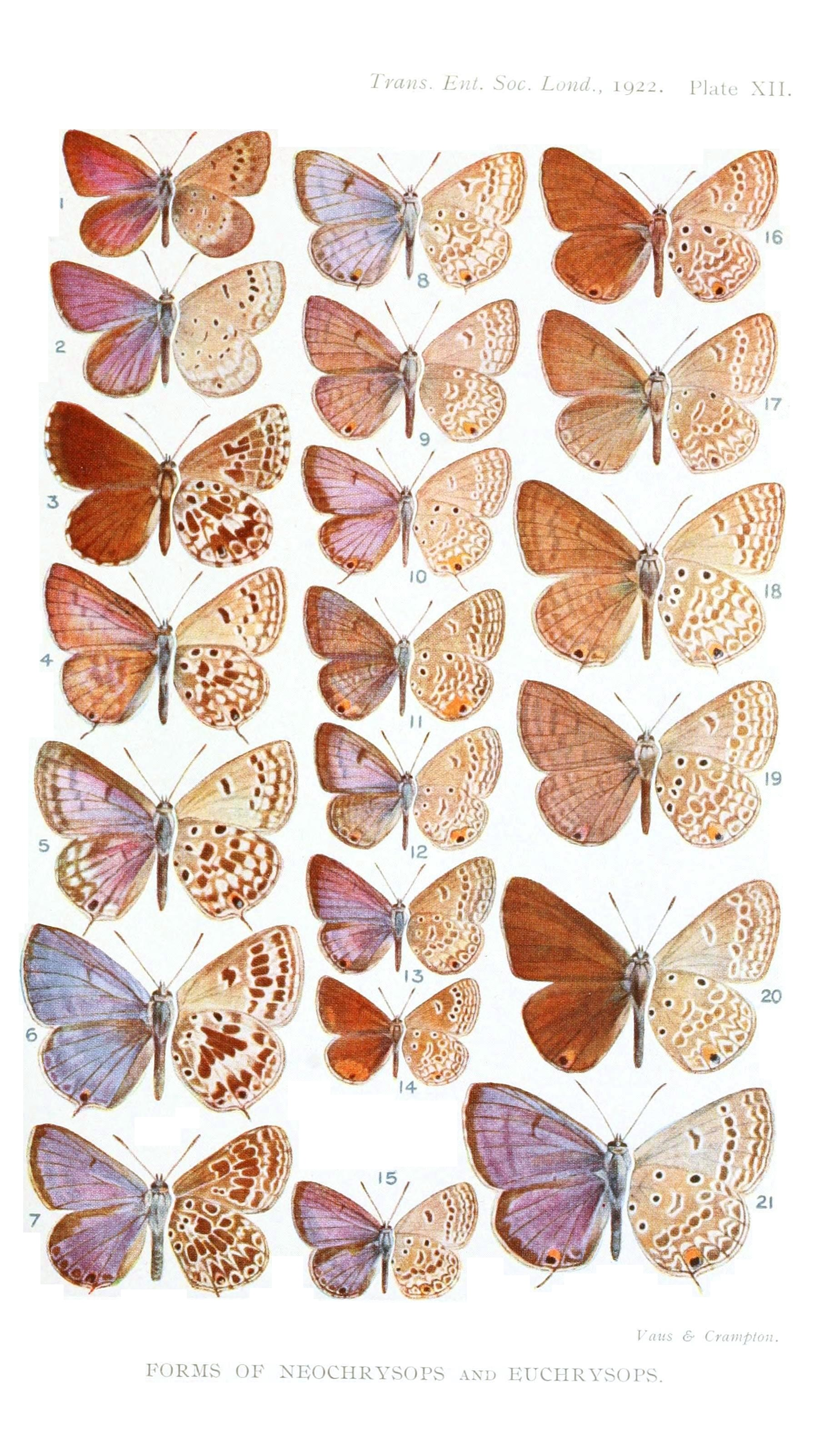
- Figure 14

Scientific classification
- Domain: Eukaryota
- Kingdom: Animalia
- Phylum: Arthropoda
- Class: Insecta
- Order: Lepidoptera
- Family: Lycaenidae
- Genus: Euchrysops
- Species: E. kabrosae

Binomial name
- Euchrysops kabrosae (Bethune-Baker, 1906)

Synonyms
- Catochrysops kabrosae Bethune-Baker, 1906

= Euchrysops kabrosae =

Species of butterfly

Euchrysops kabrosae is a butterfly in the family Lycaenidae. It is found in Kenya, Uganda and Tanzania. The habitat consists of rocky hillsides in dry, mountainous country.

== Subspecies ==
- Euchrysops kabrosae kabrosae (western Kenya, eastern Uganda)
- Euchrysops kabrosae rosieae Congdon, Kielland & Collins, 1998 (northern Tanzania)
