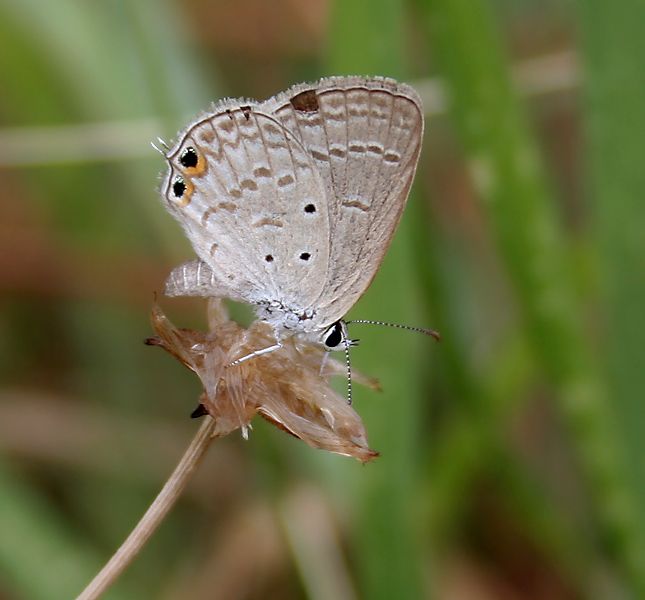
- Gram blue (Euchrysops cnejus)

Scientific classification
- Kingdom: Animalia
- Phylum: Arthropoda
- Clade: Pancrustacea
- Class: Insecta
- Order: Lepidoptera
- Family: Lycaenidae
- Subfamily: Polyommatinae
- Tribe: Polyommatini
- Genus: Euchrysops; Butler, 1900

= Euchrysops =

Butterfly genus in family Lycaenidae

Euchrysops is a genus of Afrotropical butterfly in the family Lycaenidae.

== Species ==
- Euchrysops abyssinica (Aurivillius, 1922)
- Euchrysops alberta (Butler, 1901)
- Euchrysops albistriatus (Capronnier, 1889)
- Euchrysops banyo Libert, 2001
- Euchrysops barkeri (Trimen, 1893)
- Euchrysops brunneus Bethune-Baker, 1923
- Euchrysops cnejus (Fabricius, 1798)
- Euchrysops crawshayi (Butler, 1899)
- Euchrysops cyclopteris (Butler, 1876)
- Euchrysops decaryi Stempffer, 1947
- Euchrysops dolorosa (Trimen & Bowker, 1887)
- Euchrysops jacksoni Stempffer, 1952
- Euchrysops horus (Stoneham, 1938)
- Euchrysops kabrosae (Bethune-Baker, 1906)
- Euchrysops katangae Bethune-Baker, 1923
- Euchrysops lois (Butler, 1886)
- Euchrysops malathana (Boisduval, 1833)
- Euchrysops mauensis Bethune-Baker, 1923
- Euchrysops migiurtiniensis Stempffer, 1946
- Euchrysops nandensis (Neave, 1904)
- Euchrysops nilotica (Aurivillius, 1904)
- Euchrysops osiris (Hopffer, 1855)
- Euchrysops philbyi Gabriel, 1954
- Euchrysops reducta Hulstaert, 1924
- Euchrysops sagba Libert, 1993
- Euchrysops sahelianus Libert, 2001
- Euchrysops severini Hulstaert, 1924
- Euchrysops subpallida Bethune-Baker, 1923
- Euchrysops unigemmata (Butler, 1895)

== Doubtful status ==
- Euchrysops leucyanea (Hewitson)
