= Euchrysops severini =

Scientific classification
- Domain: Eukaryota
- Kingdom: Animalia
- Phylum: Arthropoda
- Class: Insecta
- Order: Lepidoptera
- Family: Lycaenidae
- Genus: Euchrysops
- Species: E. severini

Binomial name
- Euchrysops severini Hulstaert, 1924

Species of butterfly

Euchrysops severini is a butterfly in the family Lycaenidae. It is found in the eastern part of the Democratic Republic of the Congo, western Tanzania, Uganda, Kenya and Ethiopia. The habitat consists of savanna.
