= Euchrysops reducta =

Scientific classification
- Kingdom: Animalia
- Phylum: Arthropoda
- Clade: Pancrustacea
- Class: Insecta
- Order: Lepidoptera
- Family: Lycaenidae
- Genus: Euchrysops
- Species: E. reducta

Binomial name
- Euchrysops reducta Hulstaert, 1924

Synonyms
- Euchrysops kalrosae reducta Hulstaert, 1924; Euchrysops reducta niveocincta Ungemach, 1932; Euchrysops jacksoni Stempffer, 1952

Species of butterfly

Euchrysops reducta, the Jackson's Cupid, is a butterfly in the family Lycaenidae. It is found in Senegal, Guinea, Burkina Faso, Ivory Coast, Ghana, northern Nigeria, northern Cameroon, the Central African Republic, the Democratic Republic of the Congo, Uganda and Ethiopia. The habitat consists of Guinea savanna and the southern edges of the Sudan savanna.

Torben Larsen developed a species numbering system for his 2005 publication Butterflies of West Africa. This species is #600. The 'Larsen' numbers have since been used with permission in A Sharp Eye on Butterflies of Ghana.
