= Euchrysops nandensis =

Scientific classification
- Domain: Eukaryota
- Kingdom: Animalia
- Phylum: Arthropoda
- Class: Insecta
- Order: Lepidoptera
- Family: Lycaenidae
- Genus: Euchrysops
- Species: E. nandensis

Binomial name
- Euchrysops nandensis (Neave, 1904)

Synonyms
- Catochrysops nandensis Neave, 1904; Catochrysops nandensis f. abyssiniae Storace, 1953

Species of butterfly

Euchrysops nandensis is a butterfly in the family Lycaenidae. It is found in Ethiopia, Kenya (the western part of the country and central highlands) and northern Tanzania. The habitat consists of grassy spots in savanna.
