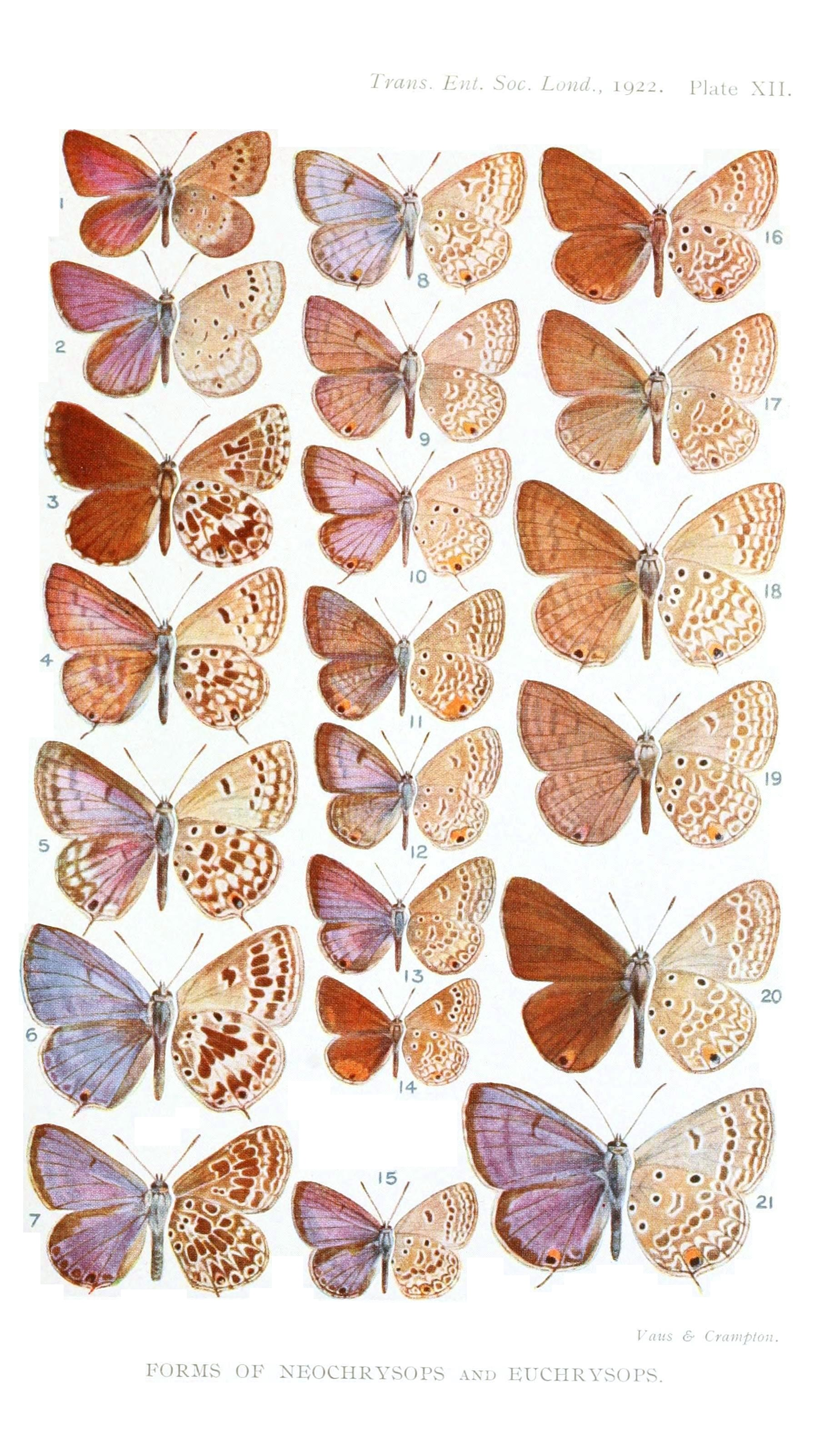
- Figure 10

Scientific classification
- Domain: Eukaryota
- Kingdom: Animalia
- Phylum: Arthropoda
- Class: Insecta
- Order: Lepidoptera
- Family: Lycaenidae
- Genus: Euchrysops
- Species: E. cyclopteris

Binomial name
- Euchrysops cyclopteris (Butler, 1876)

Synonyms
- Lampides cyclopteris Butler, 1876

= Euchrysops cyclopteris =

Species of butterfly

Euchrysops cyclopteris is a butterfly in the family Lycaenidae. It is found in Cameroon, the Central African Republic, Sudan and Ethiopia.
