= Euchrysops horus =

Scientific classification
- Domain: Eukaryota
- Kingdom: Animalia
- Phylum: Arthropoda
- Class: Insecta
- Order: Lepidoptera
- Family: Lycaenidae
- Genus: Euchrysops
- Species: E. horus

Binomial name
- Euchrysops horus (Stoneham, 1938)

Synonyms
- Cupido horus Stoneham, 1938

Species of butterfly

Euchrysops horus is a butterfly in the family Lycaenidae. It is found in Kenya.
