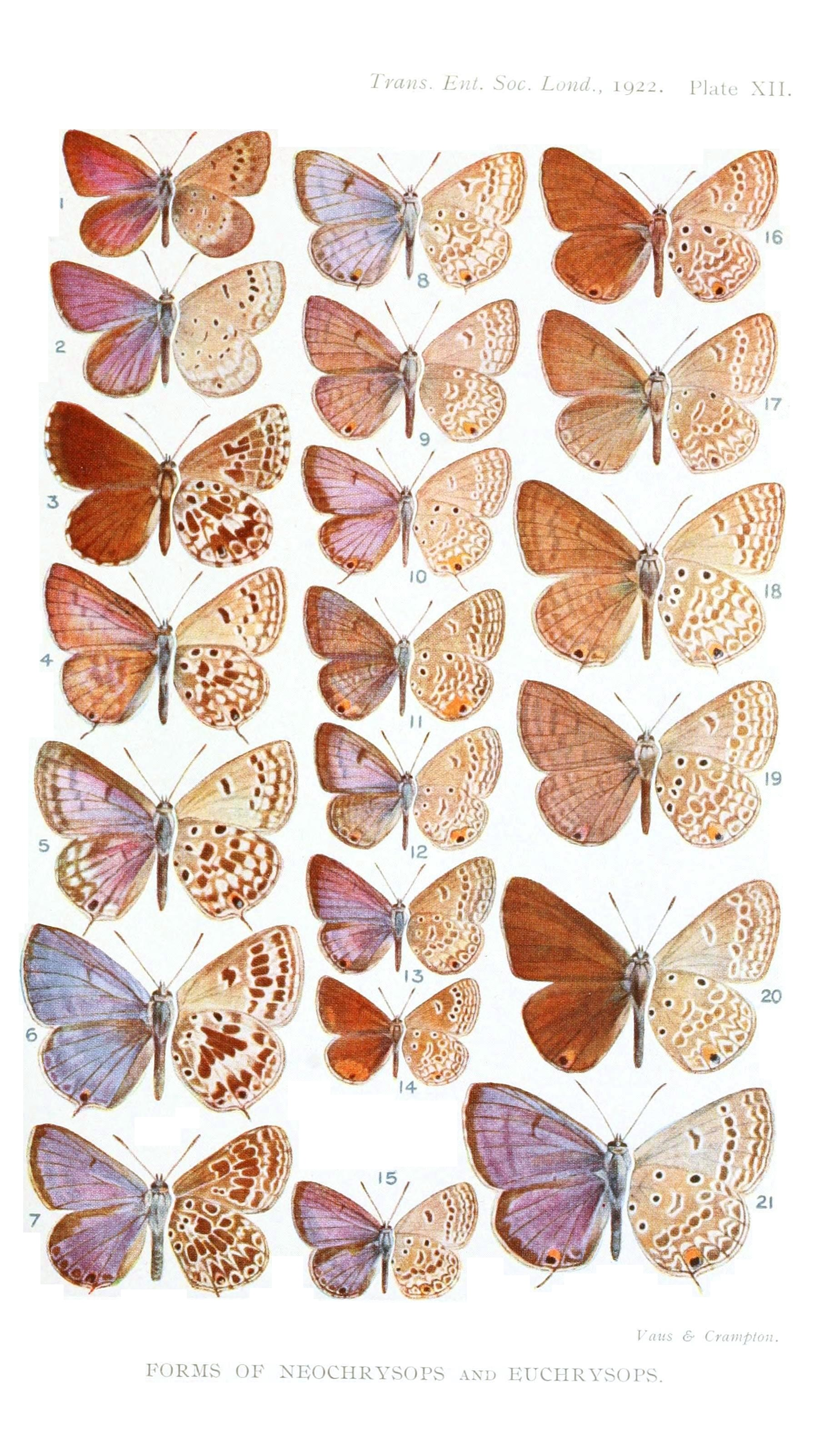
- Figure 12

Scientific classification
- Domain: Eukaryota
- Kingdom: Animalia
- Phylum: Arthropoda
- Class: Insecta
- Order: Lepidoptera
- Family: Lycaenidae
- Genus: Euchrysops
- Species: E. albistriata

Binomial name
- Euchrysops albistriata (Capronnier, 1889)

Synonyms
- Lycaena albistriata Capronnier, 1889; Euchrysops albistriatus; Cupido latrunculata Grünberg, 1910

= Euchrysops albistriata =

Species of butterfly

Euchrysops albistriata, the Capronnier's Cupid, is a butterfly in the family Lycaenidae. It is found in Guinea, Sierra Leone, Liberia, Ivory Coast, Ghana, Nigeria, Cameroon, the Democratic Republic of the Congo, Sudan, Uganda, Ethiopia, Kenya, Tanzania and Zambia. The habitat consists of forests, Guinea savanna, Sudan savanna and disturbed areas in the forest zone.

== Subspecies ==
- Euchrysops albistriata albistriata (Cameroon, Democratic Republic of the Congo, southern Sudan, Uganda, Ethiopia, Kenya, Tanzania, Zambia)
- Euchrysops albistriata greenwoodi d'Abrera, 1980 (Guinea, Sierra Leone, Liberia, Ivory Coast, Ghana, Nigeria)
