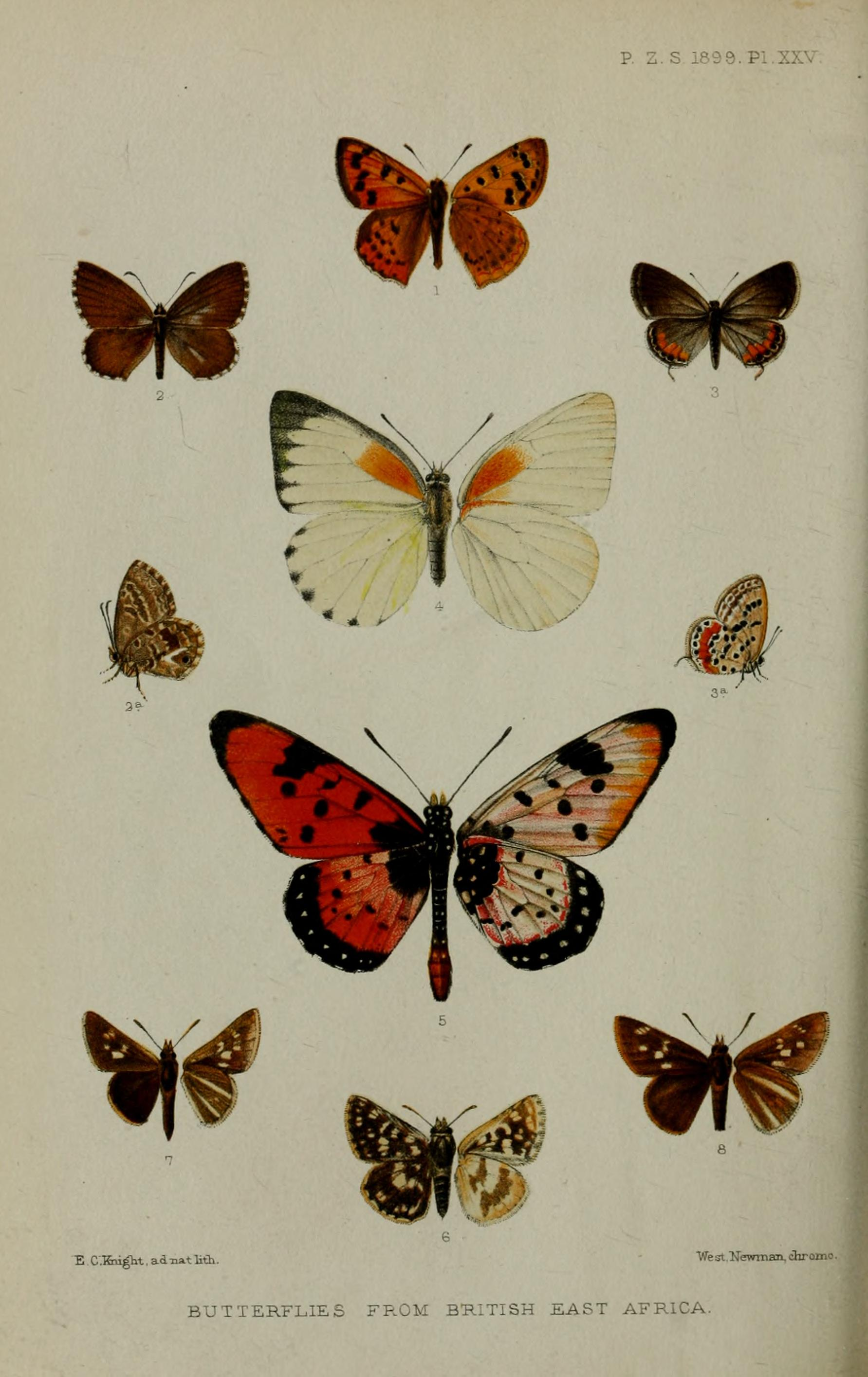
- Figure 2

Scientific classification
- Domain: Eukaryota
- Kingdom: Animalia
- Phylum: Arthropoda
- Class: Insecta
- Order: Lepidoptera
- Family: Lycaenidae
- Genus: Euchrysops
- Species: E. crawshayi

Binomial name
- Euchrysops crawshayi (Butler, 1899)

Synonyms
- Scolitantides crawshayi Butler, 1899; Scolitantides subdita Grose-Smith, 1901; Cupido crawshayanus Aurivillius, 1924

= Euchrysops crawshayi =

Species of butterfly

Euchrysops crawshayi, Crawshay's blue, is a butterfly in the family Lycaenidae. It is found in Kenya, Uganda, Tanzania, Burundi, Rwanda, Sudan and the Democratic Republic of the Congo. The habitat consists of moist savanna.

The larvae feed on Anchusa species, Cynoglossum coeruleum and Cynoglossum lanceolatum. They are attended by many species of ants, including Monomorium minutum var. pallipes.

== Subspecies ==
- Euchrysops crawshayi crawshayi (Kenya, Uganda, Tanzania, southern Sudan)
- Euchrysops crawshayi fontainei Stempffer, 1967 (Burundi, Rwanda, Democratic Republic of the Congo: east to South Kivu, north-western Tanzania)
