= Anthene arora =

Scientific classification
- Domain: Eukaryota
- Kingdom: Animalia
- Phylum: Arthropoda
- Class: Insecta
- Order: Lepidoptera
- Family: Lycaenidae
- Genus: Anthene
- Species: A. arora

Binomial name
- Anthene arora Larsen, 1983

Synonyms
- Anthene (Anthene) arora

Species of butterfly

Anthene arora is a butterfly in the family Lycaenidae. It is found in Yemen and south-western Saudi Arabia.
