= Euchrysops philbyi =

Scientific classification
- Domain: Eukaryota
- Kingdom: Animalia
- Phylum: Arthropoda
- Class: Insecta
- Order: Lepidoptera
- Family: Lycaenidae
- Genus: Euchrysops
- Species: E. philbyi

Binomial name
- Euchrysops philbyi Gabriel, 1954

Species of butterfly

Euchrysops philbyi is a butterfly in the family Lycaenidae. It is found in south-western Saudi Arabia and Yemen.
