= Tuxentius gabrieli =

Scientific classification
- Domain: Eukaryota
- Kingdom: Animalia
- Phylum: Arthropoda
- Class: Insecta
- Order: Lepidoptera
- Family: Lycaenidae
- Genus: Tuxentius
- Species: T. gabrieli

Binomial name
- Tuxentius gabrieli Balint, 1999

Synonyms
- Castalius melaena interruptus Gabriel, 1954; Castalius melaena gabriel Kemal, 1999

Species of butterfly

Tuxentius gabrieli, the Gabriel's Pierrot, is a butterfly in the family Lycaenidae. It is found in Yemen and south-western Saudi Arabia.
