= Cigaritis scotti =

Scientific classification
- Kingdom: Animalia
- Phylum: Arthropoda
- Clade: Pancrustacea
- Class: Insecta
- Order: Lepidoptera
- Family: Lycaenidae
- Genus: Cigaritis
- Species: C. scotti

Binomial name
- Cigaritis scotti (Gabriel, 1954)

Synonyms
- Spindasis scotti Gabriel, 1954

Species of butterfly

Cigaritis scotti is a butterfly in the family Lycaenidae. It is found in Yemen and Oman.
