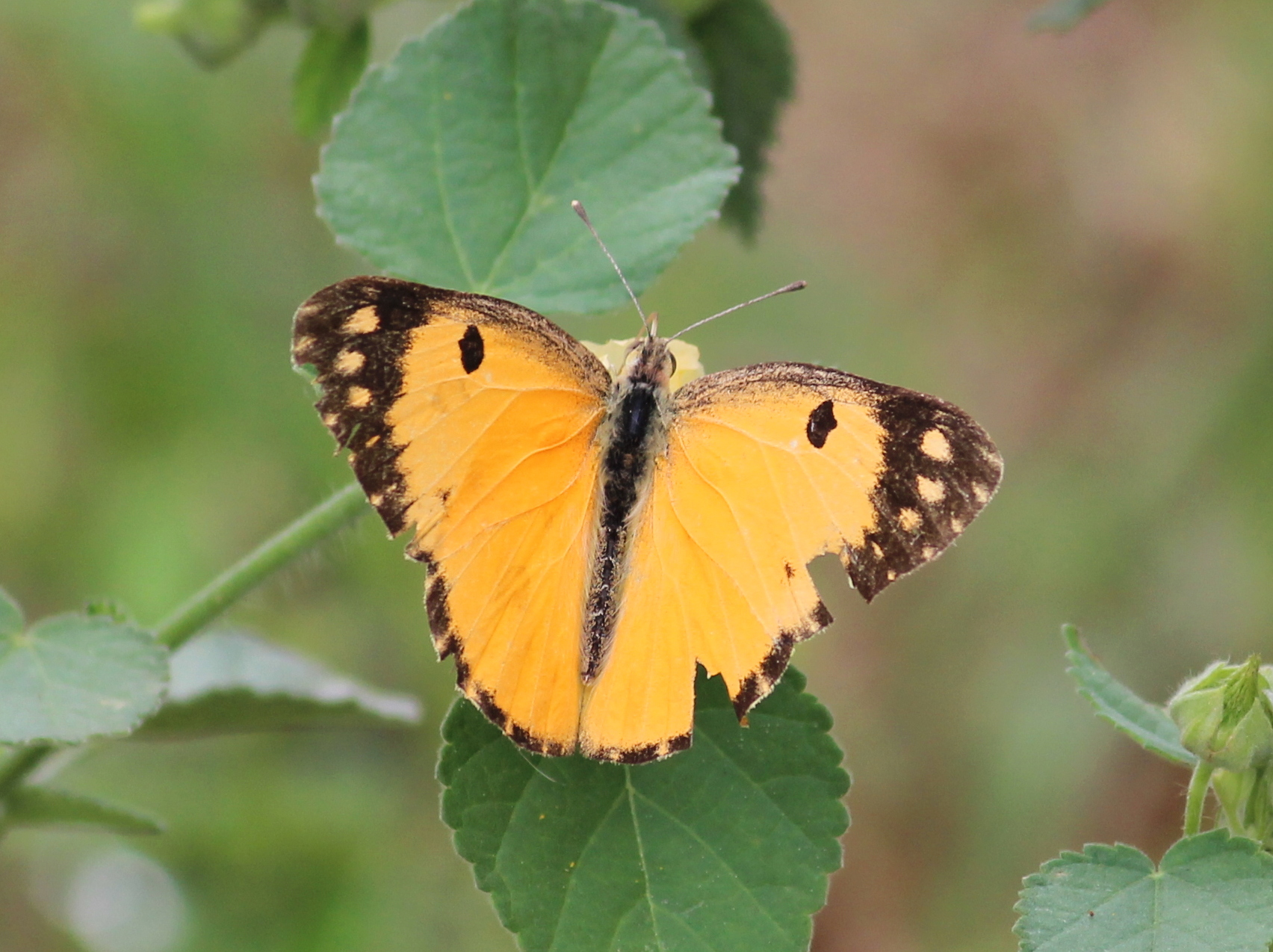
- Male
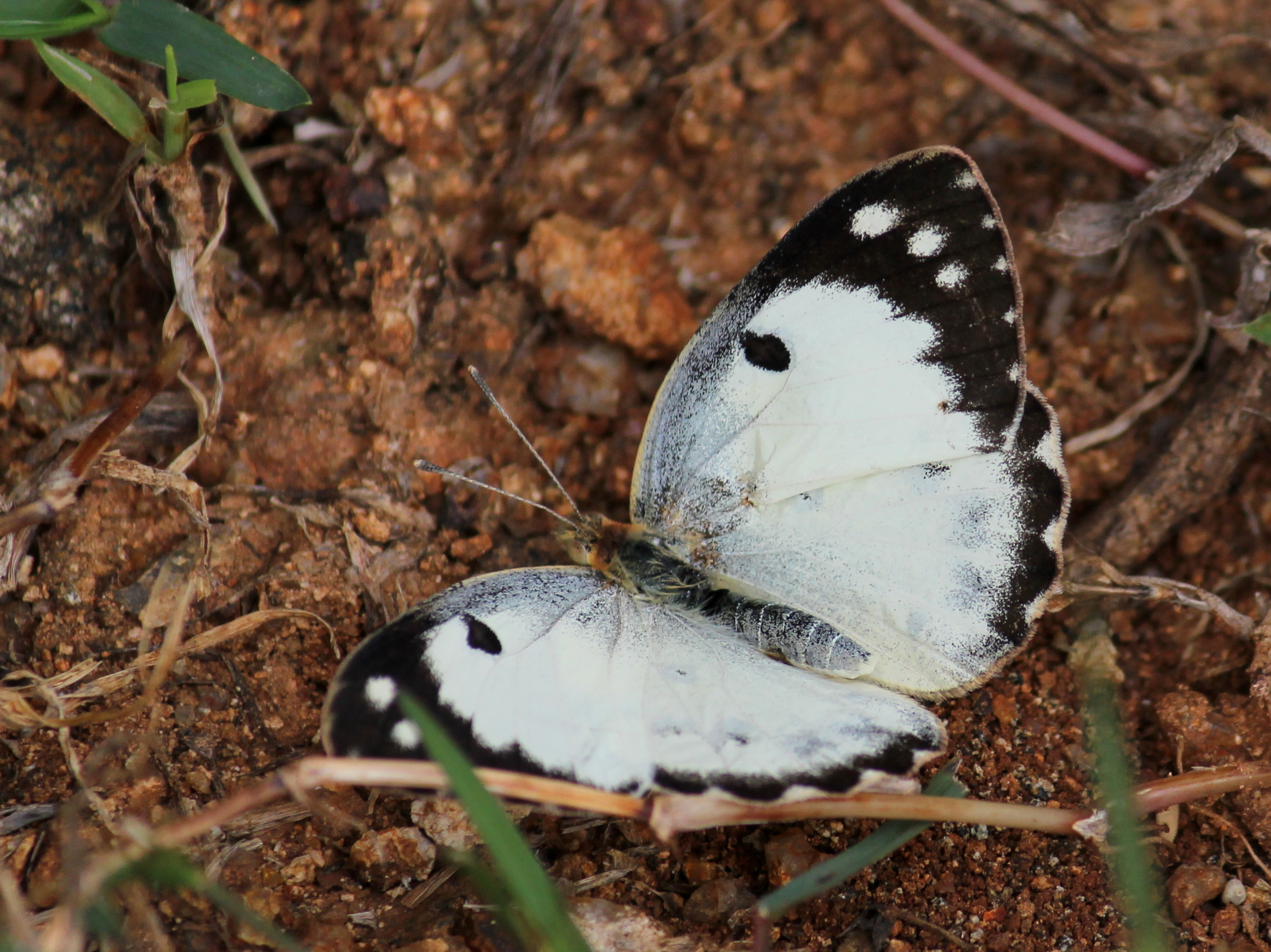
- Female

Conservation status
- Least Concern (IUCN 3.1)

Scientific classification
- Kingdom: Animalia
- Phylum: Arthropoda
- Class: Insecta
- Order: Lepidoptera
- Family: Pieridae
- Genus: Colotis
- Species: C. fausta

Binomial name
- Colotis fausta (Olivier, 1804)

Synonyms
- Papilio fausta Olivier, 1807; Colotis (Colotis) fausta; Colotis fausta somalica Carpenter and Jackson, 1950; Madais fausta Olivier, 1804; Teracolus vi Swinhoe, 1884; Teracolus fausta ab. immaculata Röber, 1907

= Colotis fausta =

Large salmon Arab

Species of butterfly

Colotis fausta, the large salmon Arab, is a small butterfly of the family Pieridae, that is, the yellows and whites, which is found in Israel, Syria, Turkey, Iran, Afghanistan, Turkmenistan, India, Arabia, Chad, Somalia and United Arab Emirates.

== Description ==
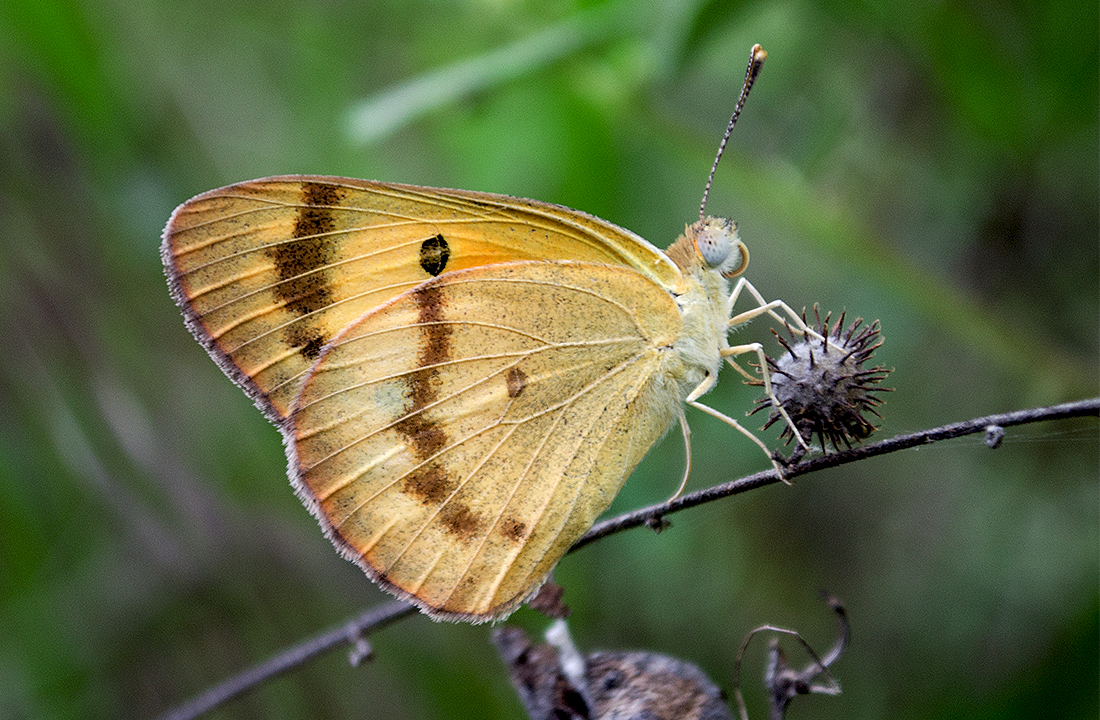
Male, India

The ground colour on the upperside of males is pale salmon buff, paler in specimens from desert areas, darker in those procured in regions where there is a regular though not heavy rainfall. Forewing: base and costal margin irrorated (speckled) in varying degree with dusky scales; an oval annular discocellular spot that varies in size; a black, festooned, postdiscal band that extends from costa to vein 4, beyond which the veins are margined with black; this colour broadened sub-terminally into a second transverse fascia, that is followed by a very fine black line on the extreme terminal margin. In specimens from desert regions the transverse bands and the black edging to the veins are narrow, but in moister areas the two transverse bands unite posteriorly and with the slender black terminal line give an appearance as of a double series of spots of the ground colour enclosed between them. Hindwing: more uniform, the veins with terminal black spots; costa broadly pale, fading to white. Underside: pale yellowish white, in many specimens from moist localities suffused with a beautiful rosy flush; the markings in such specimens prominent, in those from dry localities more or less obsolescent. Forewing: discocellular spot as on the upperside, but complete, and not an oval ring; in some specimens a postdiscal, dark ochraceous brown, narrow, curved band from costa to middle of interspace 2. Hindwing: a small discocellular spot in the form of an oval light brown ring always much smaller than the similar spot on the forewing; a postdiscal, curved, more or less sinuate band similar to and in continuation of the band on the forewing from the costa to vein 1. Antennae, head, thorax and abdomen dusky black, the club of the antennae on the underside, the hairs that cover the head and thorax and the scaling of the abdomen salmon buff; beneath: much paler, fading to white in specimens from dry localities. Sex-mark: a small patch of brown specialized scales on the underside of the forewing above vein 1, closer to the base than to the termen. On the upperside this is more or less prominent as a small raised spot.

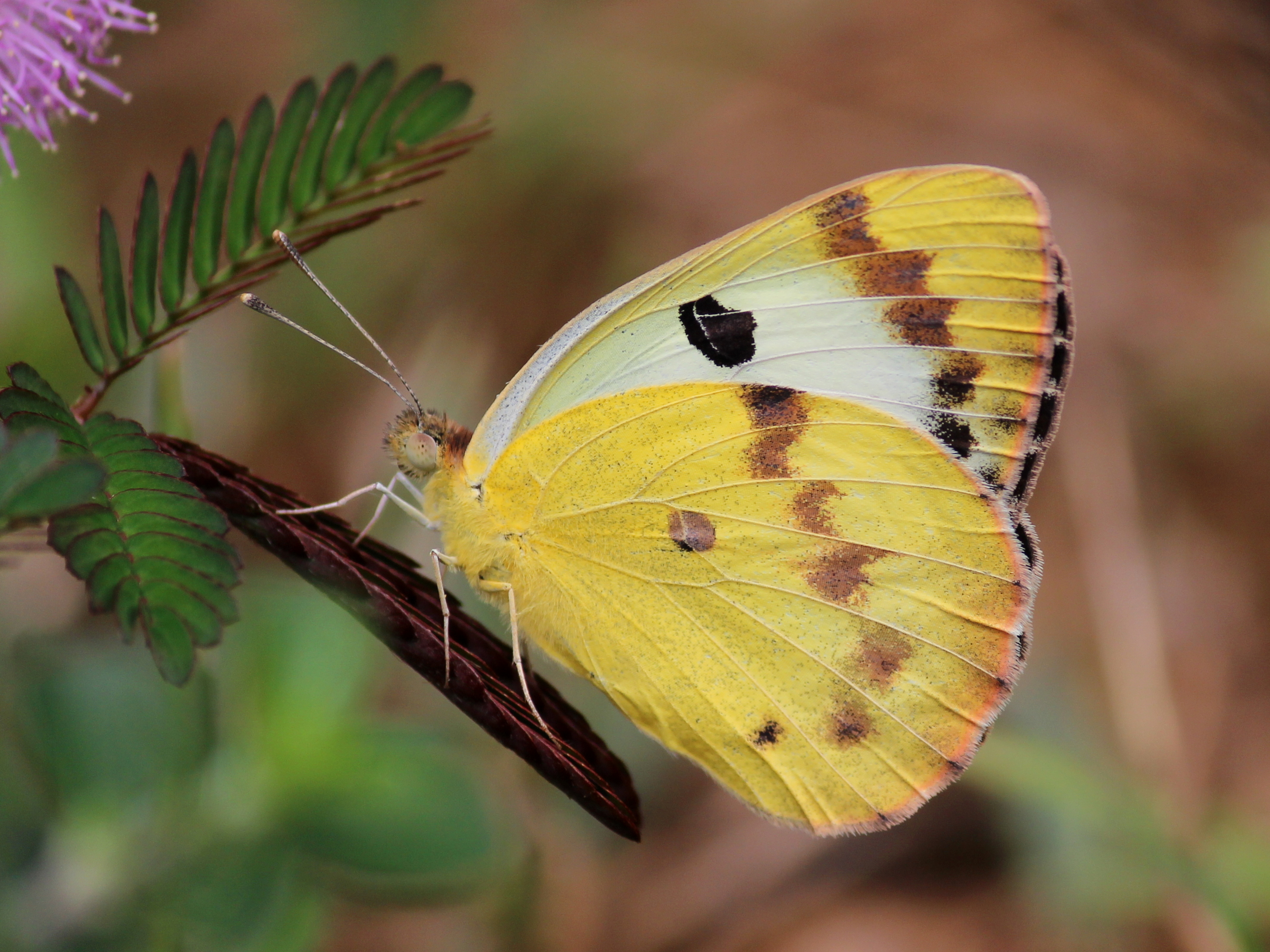
Female, India

Females are dimorphic. Form 1: ground colour and markings as in the male; the costa of the hindwing on the upperside concolorous with the rest of the wing; the sex-mark of course absent. Form 2. Upperside: ground colour white, often more or less irregularly suffused on parts of the wing with salmon buff; markings similar to those in the male, but very much broader. Forewing: base and costal area heavily irrorated with greyish-blue scales. Hindwing: the terminal spots at apices of the veins large and quadrate, often united into a continuous band which then encloses an anteciliary series of spots of the ground colour. In a few specimens there are traces of a postdiscal macular black band, in a very few this band is almost complete and very prominent. Underside: ground colour white; markings as in the male, but broader, darker and more prominent.

It is found in Baluchistan, Sind, the Punjab, Rajasthan and Bombay. The species is also found in Asia Minor, Arabia, Persia and Afghanistan.

Race tripuncta, Butler. Very closely resembles the typical from, but this the southern form or race can be distinguished as follows: Male upperside has the ground colour of a much deeper tint of salmon buff, almost orange yellow. Forewing: costa heavily irrorated with black scales; discocellular spot larger, not annular; postdiscal black fascia at all seasons united to the subterminal fascia and black anteciliary line so that the whole apex and termen of the wing are black, broadly at the costa and gradually narrowed towards the tornal angle. This black area encloses never more than three preapical moderately large spots and a complete series of minute anteciliary specks of the ground colour. Hindwing: as in C. fausta, but the terminal black spots very large. Underside: ground colour of a richer yellower tint than in the typical form; markings similar, those on the forewing dusky black, on the hindwing rose pink. Antennae, head, thorax, abdomen and sex-mark as in male of the typical form.

Female upperside closely resembles the female of form 2 of C. fausta, but all the markings are darker and conspicuously broader, while the number of the preapical spots of the ground colour enclosed within the black area on the forewing is never more than three, the same as in the male. Underside, forewing: white sometimes faintly suffused with yellow; apical and terminal areas anteriorly light to dark ochraceous yellow; discocellular spot very large; transverse, postdiscal, macular dark reddish-brown band very broad. Hindwing: pale ochraceous yellow, sparsely powdered with black scales; transverse postdiscal macular band reddish brown and broad as in the forewing. Antennae, head, thorax and abdomen as in female form 2 of C. fausta.

Western and southern India: Bombay, Poona, the Nilgiris up to 6,000 feet (1,800 m), the Anaimalai Hills; eastern India: Orissa in Bengal, Ganjam; Ceylon.

== Subspecies ==
- Colotis fausta fausta (Turkmenistan, Israel, Syria, Turkey, Iran, Afghanistan, Arabia, Chad and United Arab Emirates)
- Colotis fausta faustina (C. & R. Felder, [1865]) (central India)
- Colotis fausta fulvia (Wallace, 1867) (south India, Sri Lanka)
- Colotis fausta mijurteina Carpenter, 1951 (northern Somalia)
- Colotis fausta vi (Swinhoe, 1884) (Arabia)

== See also ==
- List of butterflies of India (Pieridae)
