= Lepidochrysops haveni =

Scientific classification
- Kingdom: Animalia
- Phylum: Arthropoda
- Class: Insecta
- Order: Lepidoptera
- Family: Lycaenidae
- Genus: Lepidochrysops
- Species: L. haveni

Binomial name
- Lepidochrysops haveni Larsen, 1983

Species of butterfly

Lepidochrysops haveni is a butterfly in the family Lycaenidae. It is found in Yemen. The habitat consists of arid stony ground at altitudes of about 900 meters.

Adults have been recorded in October and May.
