= Euchrysops lois =

Scientific classification
- Domain: Eukaryota
- Kingdom: Animalia
- Phylum: Arthropoda
- Class: Insecta
- Order: Lepidoptera
- Family: Lycaenidae
- Genus: Euchrysops
- Species: E. lois

Binomial name
- Euchrysops lois (Butler, 1886)

Synonyms
- Catochrysops lois Butler, 1886

Species of butterfly

Euchrysops lois is a butterfly in the family Lycaenidae. It is found in Somalia, south-western Saudi Arabia, Yemen and Oman.
