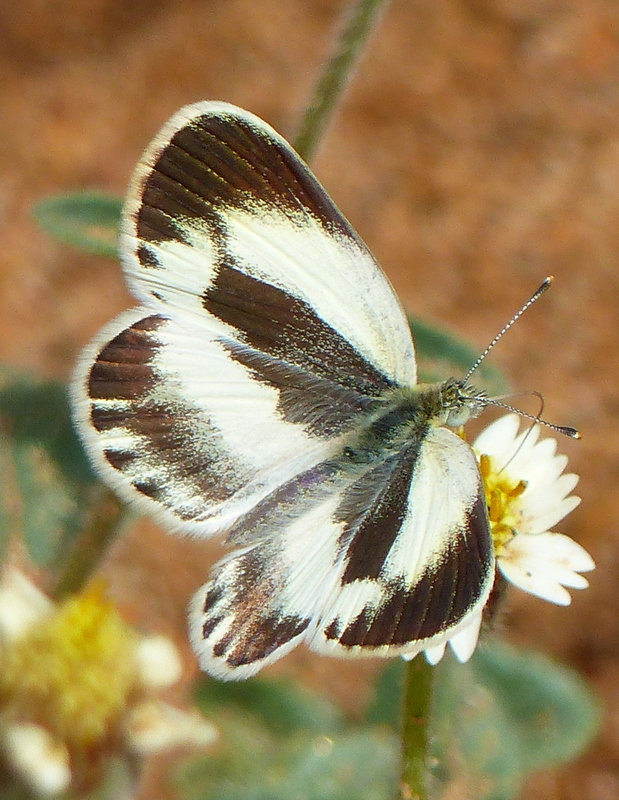

Scientific classification
- Kingdom: Animalia
- Phylum: Arthropoda
- Class: Insecta
- Order: Lepidoptera
- Family: Pieridae
- Genus: Colotis
- Species: C. daira

Binomial name
- Colotis daira (Klug, 1829)

Synonyms
- List: Pontia daira Klug, 1829; Colotis (Colotis) daira; Teracolus yerburyi Swinhoe, 1884; Teracolus swinhoei Butler, 1885; Teracolus jacksoni Sharpe, 1890; Teracolus daira ab. flavidus Aurivillius, 1910; Colotis daira f. flavidifacies Stoneham, 1940; Colotis daira f. arusaroides Stoneham, 1940; Anthopsyche stygia Felder & Felder, 1865; Anthopsyche dalila Felder and Felder, 1865; Teracolus odysseus Swinhoe, 1884; Teracolus thruppi Butler, 1886; Teracolus daira ab. flavus Aurivillius, 1910; Colotis daira thruppi f. arusa Talbot, 1939; Colotis daira thruppi f. canescens Talbot, 1939

= Colotis daira =

Species of butterfly

Colotis daira, the black-marked orange tip, is a species of butterfly in the family Pieridae. It is found in the Nigeria, Sudan, Ethiopia, Somalia, Saudi Arabia, Yemen, Oman, Kenya and Tanzania. The habitat consists of dry savanna.

Both sexes are attracted to flowers.

The larvae feed on Capparis and Cadaba species.

== Subspecies ==
- Colotis daira daira - south-western Saudi Arabia, Yemen, Oman
- Colotis daira jacksoni (Sharpe, 1890) - eastern Kenya, north-eastern Tanzania
- Colotis daira stygia (Felder & Felder, 1865) - north-eastern Nigeria, Sudan, southern Ethiopia, Somalia, northern and western Kenya
