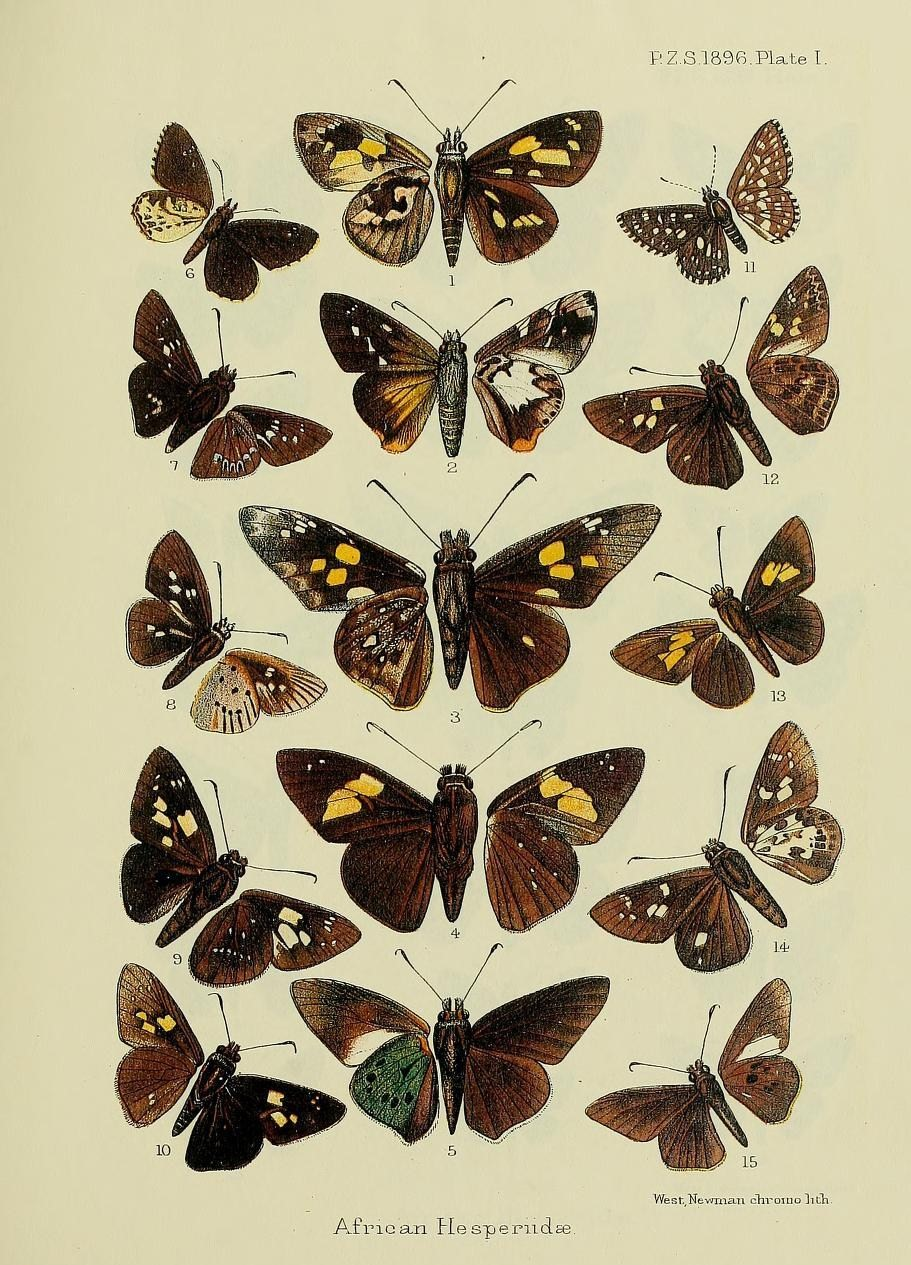
- Figure 11

Scientific classification
- Domain: Eukaryota
- Kingdom: Animalia
- Phylum: Arthropoda
- Class: Insecta
- Order: Lepidoptera
- Family: Hesperiidae
- Genus: Spialia
- Species: S. colotes

Binomial name
- Spialia colotes (H. Druce, 1875)

Synonyms
- Pyrgus colotes H. Druce, 1875; Pyrgus transvaaliae Trimen, 1889; Pyrgus nora Plötz, 1884

= Spialia colotes =

Bushveld sandman

Species of butterfly

Spialia colotes, the Bushveld sandman, is a butterfly of the family Hesperiidae. The species was first described by Herbert Druce in 1875. It is found in Angola, Botswana and from South Africa to Ethiopia and south-western Arabia.

The wingspan is from 21–28 mm.

The flight period is from December to May, with a single brood.

The larvae feed on Hibiscus fuscus.

== Subspecies ==
- Spialia colotes colotes (Angola)
- Spialia colotes semiconfluens de Jong, 1978 (Ethiopia, Somalia, eastern Kenya, north-eastern Uganda, south-western Arabia)
- Spialia colotes transvaaliae (Trimen, 1889) - Transvaal grizzled skipper (South West Africa, Botswana, Transvaal, from Zimbabwe to Kenya)
