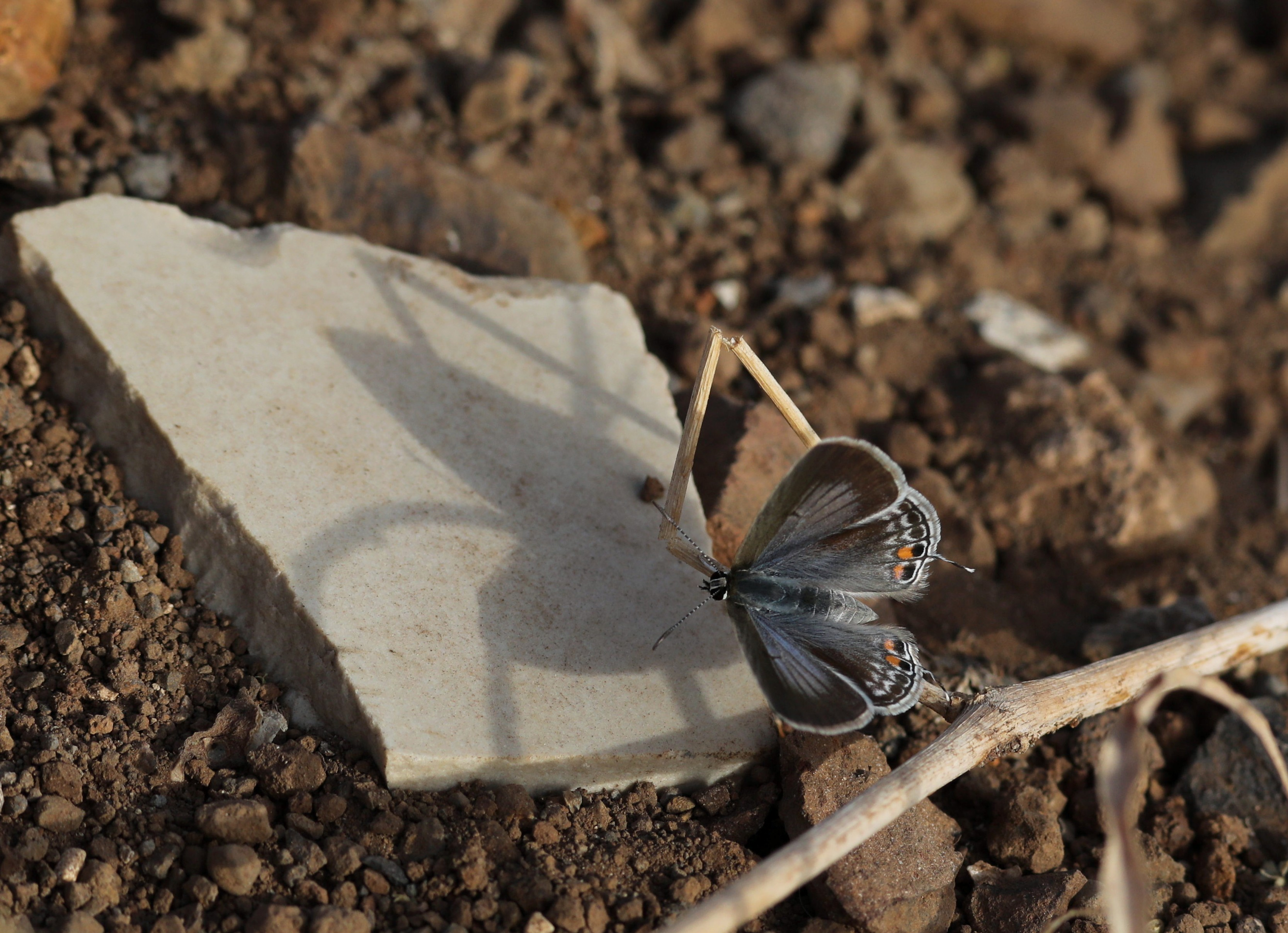

Scientific classification
- Kingdom: Animalia
- Phylum: Arthropoda
- Clade: Pancrustacea
- Class: Insecta
- Order: Lepidoptera
- Family: Lycaenidae
- Genus: Euchrysops
- Species: E. osiris

Binomial name
- Euchrysops osiris (Hopffer, 1855)

Synonyms
- Lycaena osiris Hopffer, 1855; Lycaena anubis Snellen, 1872; Lycaena anubis var. phoa Snellen, 1872; Lycaena pyrrhops Mabille, 1877; Catochrysops cuprescens Sharpe, 1898; Euchrysops osiris f. australis Hulstaert, 1924; Euchrysops osiris orientalis Hulstaert, 1924

= Euchrysops osiris =

Species of butterfly

Euchrysops osiris, the Osiris smoky blue or African Cupid, is a butterfly of the family Lycaenidae. It is found in southern Arabia, Madagascar, the Comoro Islands and Africa, south of the Sahara.

The wingspan is 22–29 mm for males and 25–30 mm for females. Adults are mainly on wing from September to November and from February to April, but may be found year-round. There are two main generations per year.

The larvae feed on Rhynchosia totta, Vigna tenuis and Vigna unguiculata.

Torben Larsen developed a species numbering system for his 2005 publication Butterflies of West Africa. This species is #604. The 'Larsen' numbers have since been used with permission in A Sharp Eye on Butterflies of Ghana.
