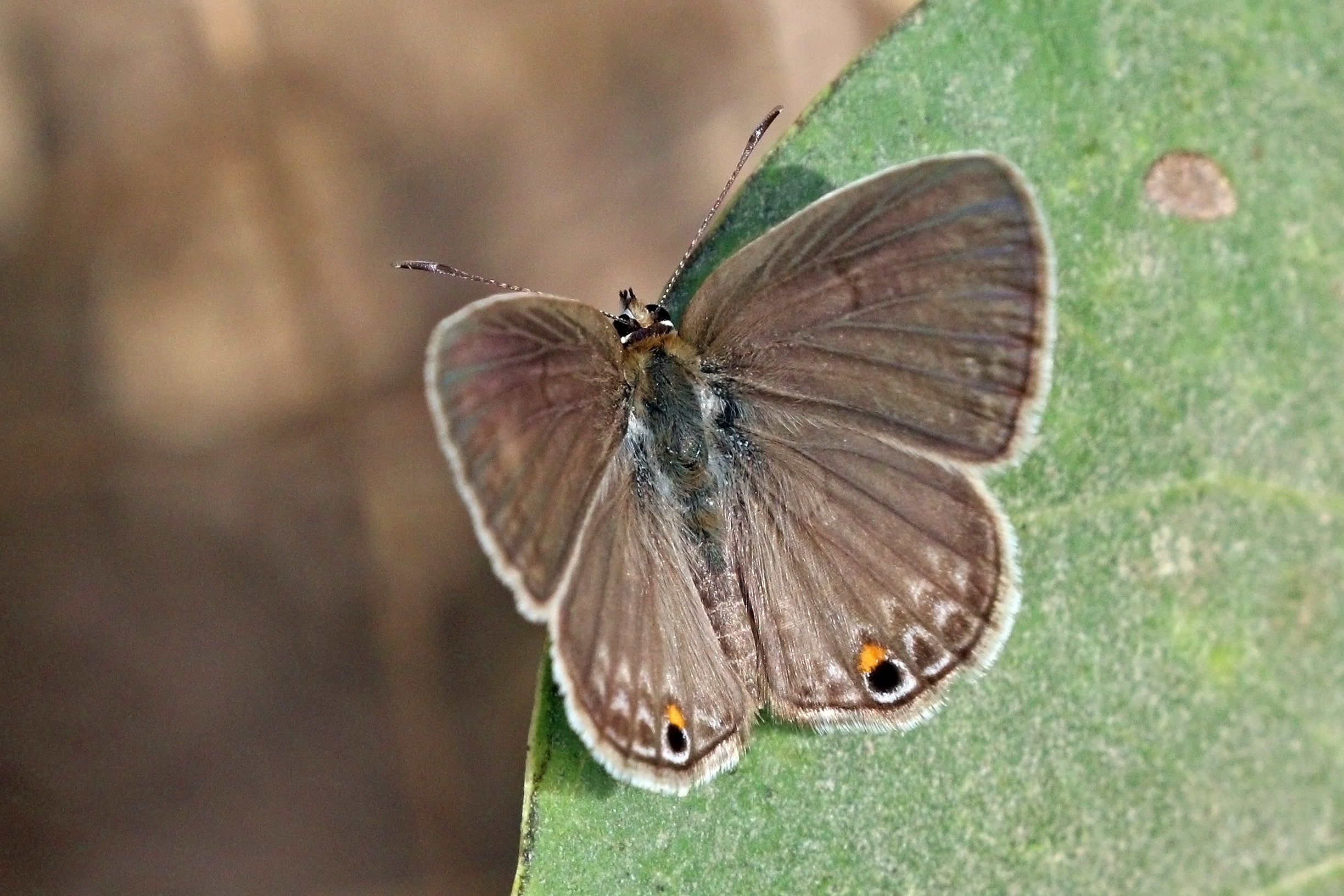
- male, The Gambia
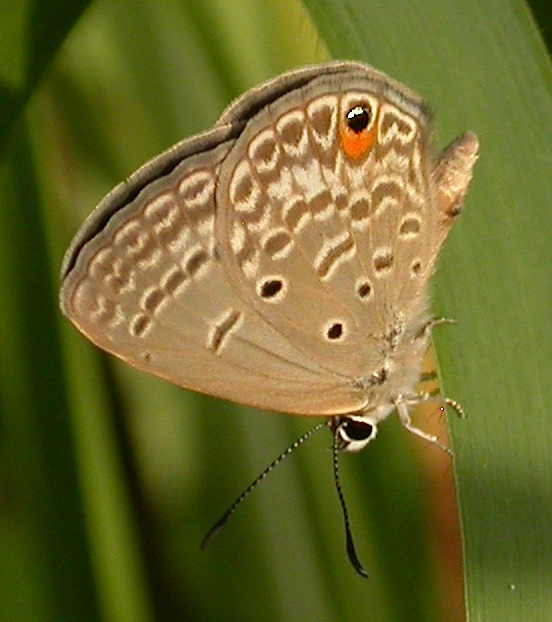
- Benin

Scientific classification
- Kingdom: Animalia
- Phylum: Arthropoda
- Clade: Pancrustacea
- Class: Insecta
- Order: Lepidoptera
- Family: Lycaenidae
- Genus: Euchrysops
- Species: E. malathana

Binomial name
- Euchrysops malathana (Boisduval, 1833)

Synonyms
- Lycaena malathana Boisduval, 1833; Lycaena asopus Hopffer, 1855; Lycaena asopus Hopffer, 1855; Lycaena kama Trimen, 1862

= Euchrysops malathana =

Common smoky blue

Species of butterfly

Euchrysops malathana, the common smoky blue or smoky bean Cupid, is a butterfly of the family Lycaenidae. It is found in south-western Arabia and Africa, south of the Sahara including Madagascar.

The wingspan is 22–30 mm for males and 23–31 mm for females. Adults are on wing year-round, with a peak from December to May in South Africa.

The larvae feed on Sphenostylis angustifolius, Medicago, Psidium, Canavalia and Vigna species (including V. triloba and V. unguiculata).

Torben Larsen developed a species numbering system for his 2005 publication Butterflies of West Africa. This species is #601. The 'Larsen' numbers have since been used with permission in A Sharp Eye on Butterflies of Ghana.

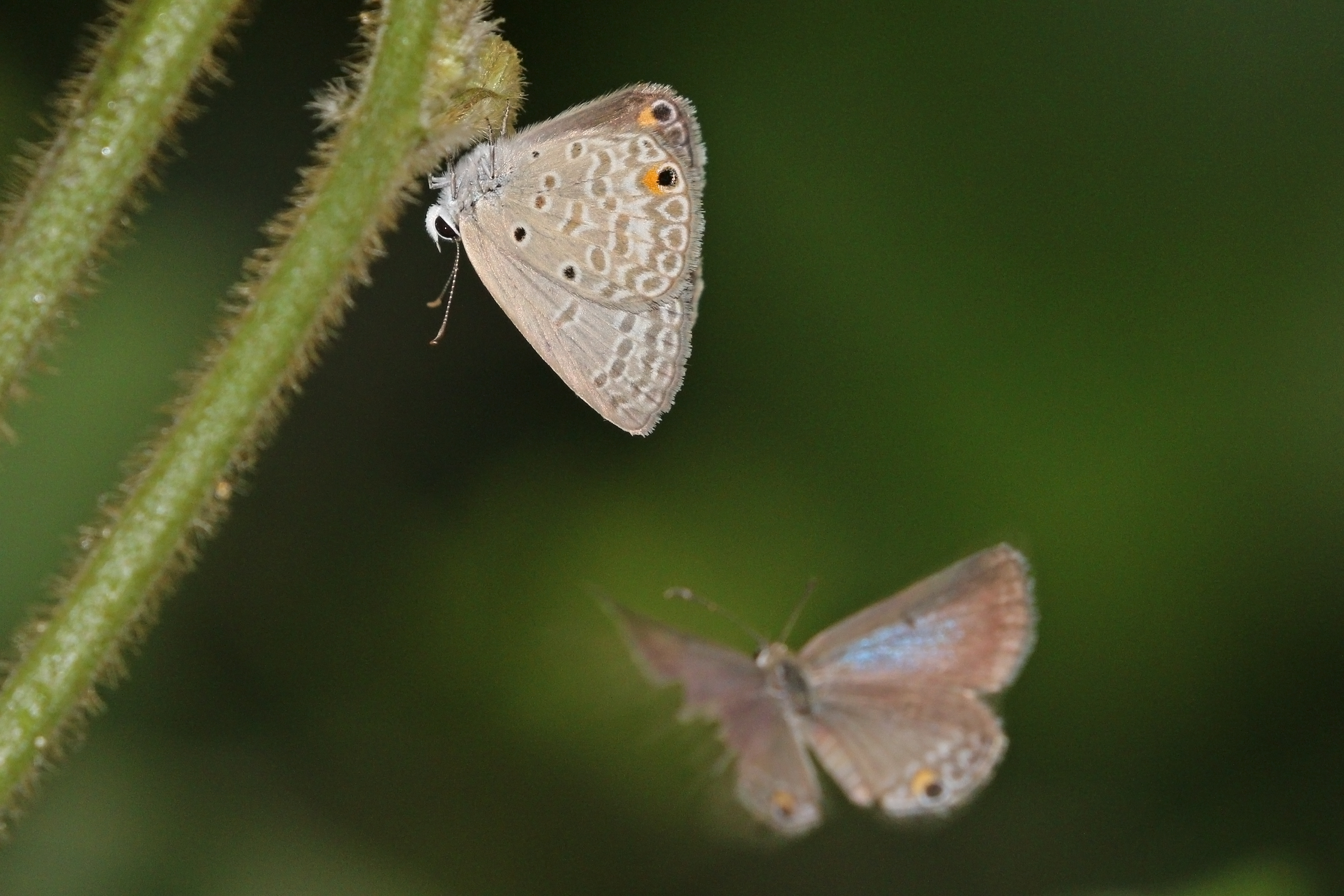
female being courted, Ghana
