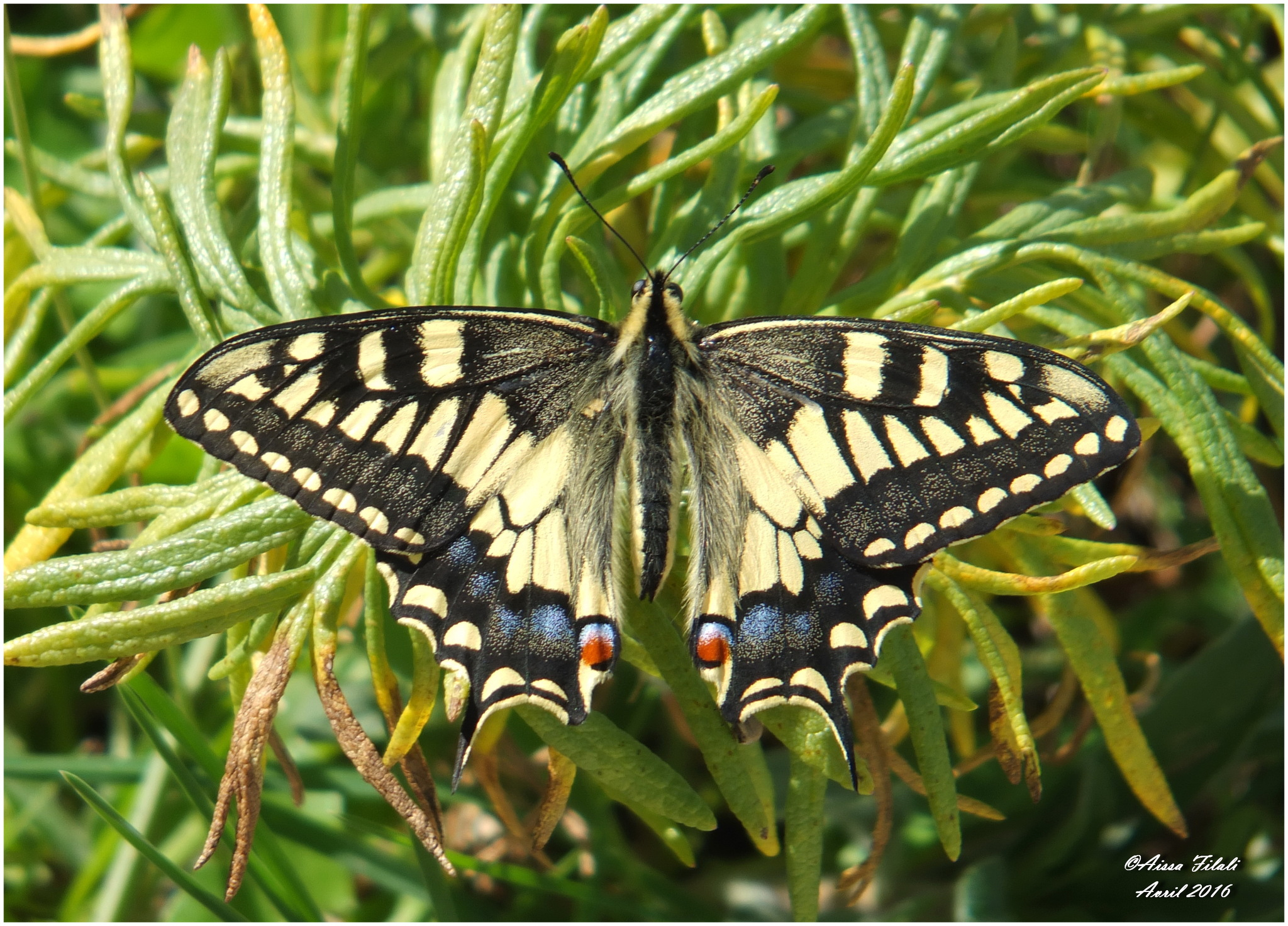
- Upperside
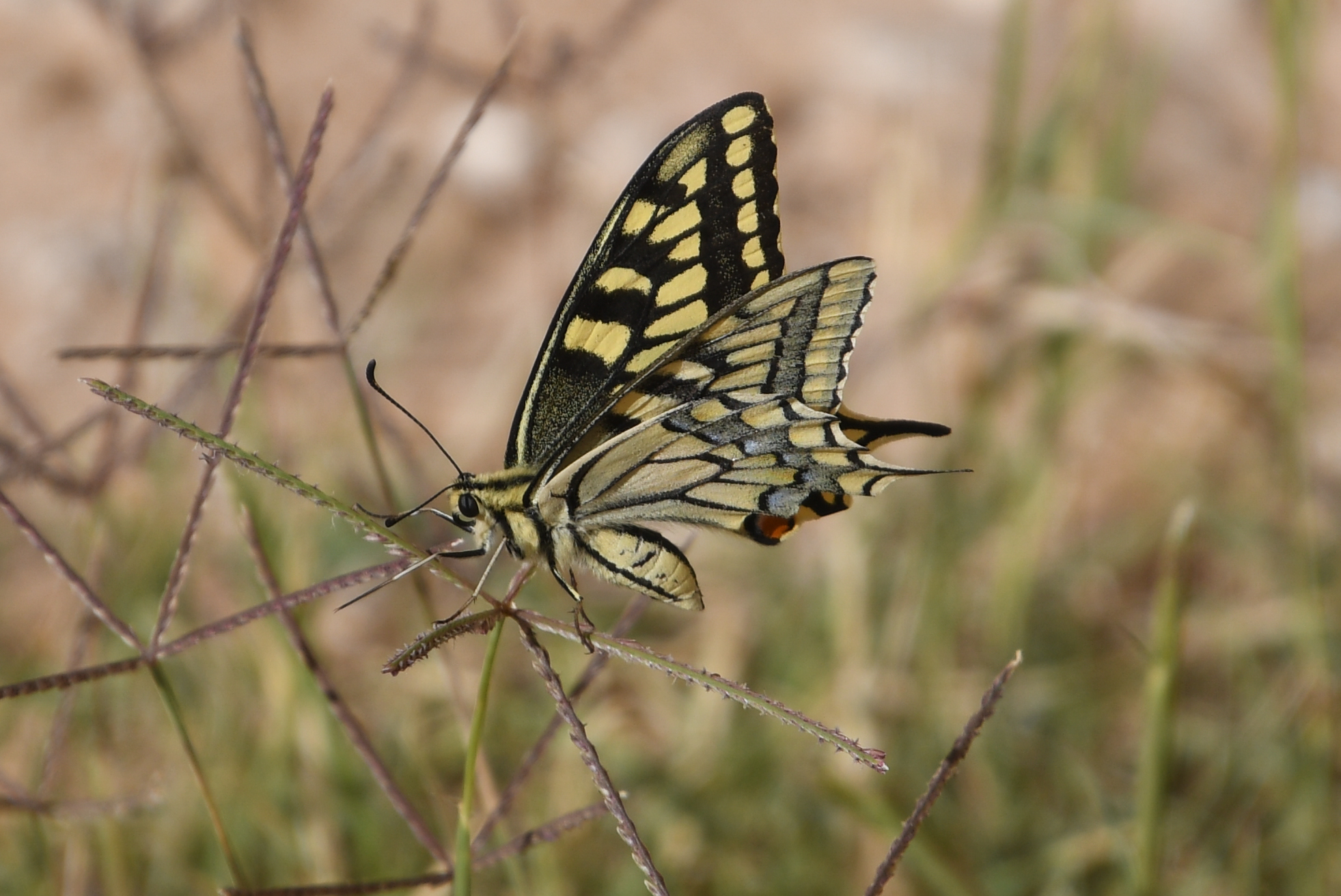
- Underside

Scientific classification
- Kingdom: Animalia
- Phylum: Arthropoda
- Clade: Pancrustacea
- Class: Insecta
- Order: Lepidoptera
- Family: Papilionidae
- Genus: Papilio
- Species: P. saharae

Binomial name
- Papilio saharae Oberthür, 1879

Synonyms
- Papilio machaon var. saharae Oberthür, 1879; Papilio machaon var. hospitonides Oberthür, 1888; Papilio machaon saharae f. xanthosoma Turati, 1924

= Papilio saharae =

Species of butterfly

Papilio saharae, the Sahara swallowtail, is a butterfly of the family Papilionidae. It is found in North Africa and Arabia.

== Biology ==
The larva feeds on Deverra chloranthus, Deverra scopularia, Seseli varium, Ferula communis and Pycnocyla glauca.

== Subspecies ==
- Papilio saharae saharae (North Africa, Arabia)
- Papilio saharae rathjensi Warnecke, 1932 (Yemen, south-western Saudi Arabia)
- Papilio saharae aferpilaggi Cassar & Catania, 2023 (Lampedusa Island)
