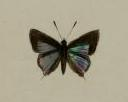

Scientific classification
- Domain: Eukaryota
- Kingdom: Animalia
- Phylum: Arthropoda
- Class: Insecta
- Order: Lepidoptera
- Family: Lycaenidae
- Genus: Chloroselas
- Species: C. esmeralda

Binomial name
- Chloroselas esmeralda Butler, 1886

= Chloroselas esmeralda =

Somali gem

Species of butterfly

Chloroselas esmeralda, the Somali gem, is a butterfly in the family Lycaenidae. It is found in Somalia, Ethiopia, Kenya, Uganda, Tanzania, Yemen and Oman. The habitat consists of arid savanna.

The larvae possibly feed on Acacia tortilis.

== Subspecies ==
- Chloroselas esmeralda esmeralda (Somalia, Ethiopia, Kenya, western Uganda, northern Tanzania)
- Chloroselas esmeralda bilqis Larsen, 1983 (Yemen, Oman: Dhofar)
