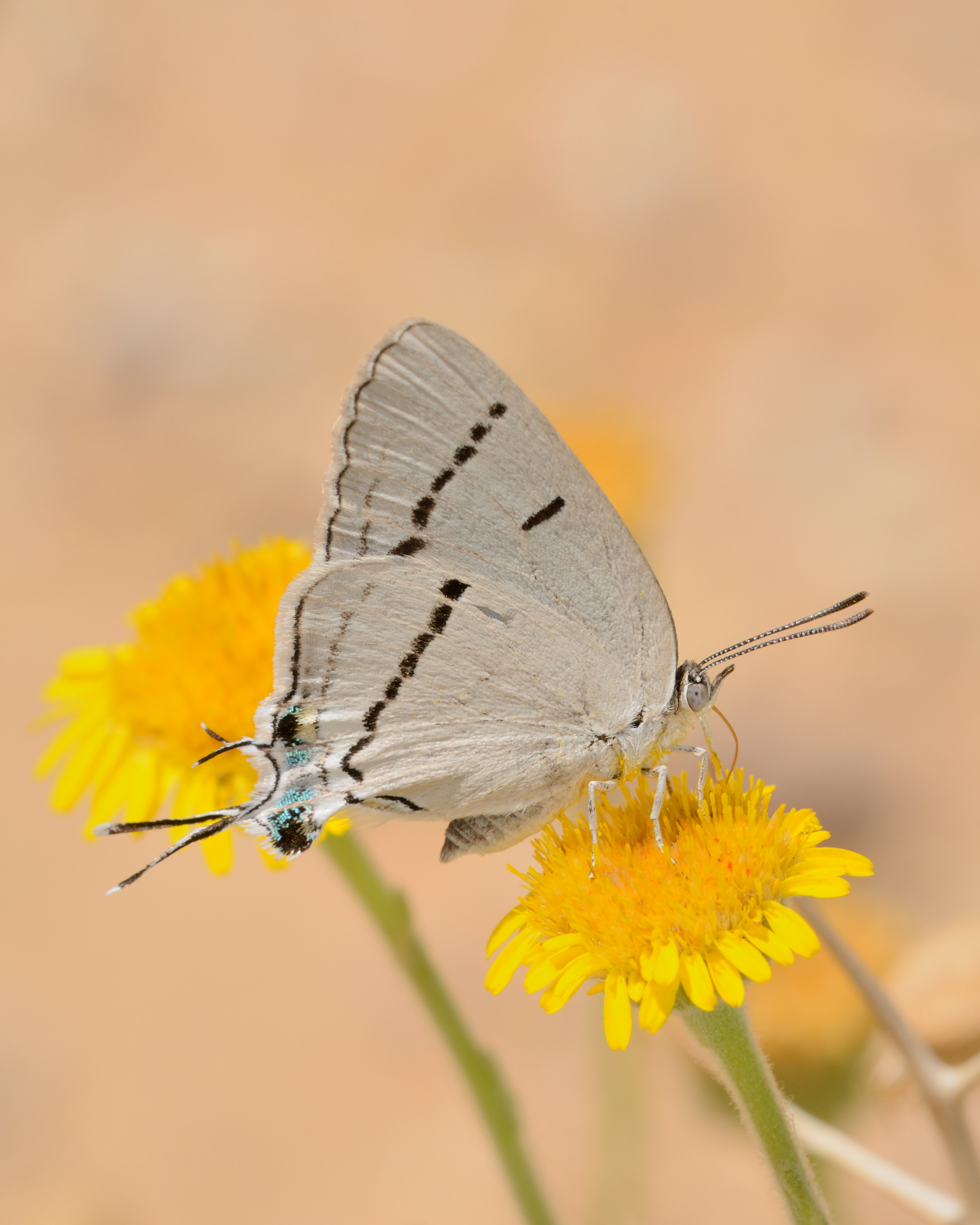

Scientific classification
- Kingdom: Animalia
- Phylum: Arthropoda
- Clade: Pancrustacea
- Class: Insecta
- Order: Lepidoptera
- Family: Lycaenidae
- Genus: Iolaus
- Species: I. glaucus

Binomial name
- Iolaus glaucus Butler, 1886

Synonyms
- Jolaus jordanus Staudinger, 1897; Epamera glaucus; Iolaus (Epamera) glaucus

= Iolaus glaucus =

Species of butterfly

Iolaus glaucus is a butterfly in the family Lycaenidae. It is found in Israel, Jordan, western Saudi Arabia, Oman, Yemen, Ethiopia and Somalia.
