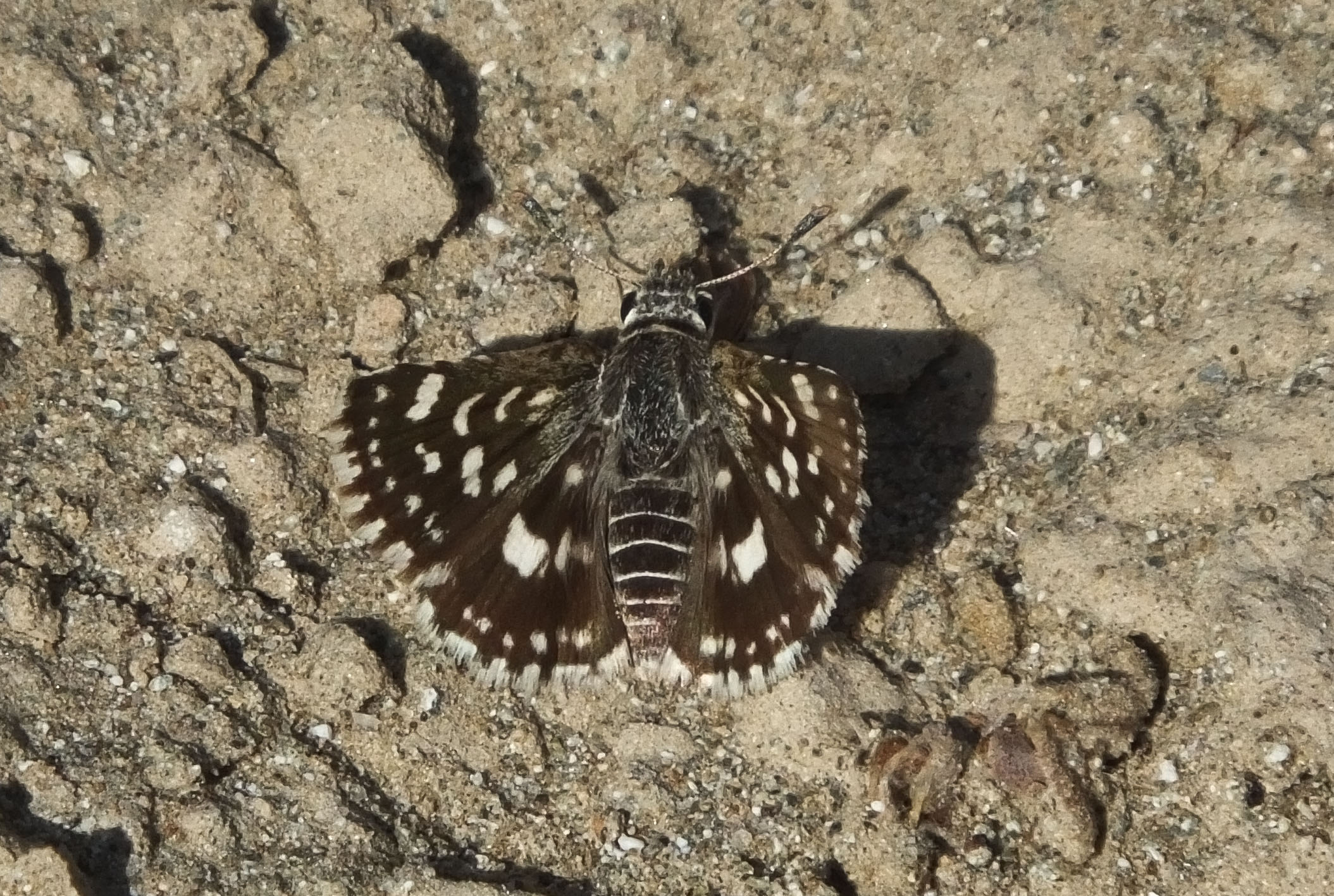

Scientific classification
- Domain: Eukaryota
- Kingdom: Animalia
- Phylum: Arthropoda
- Class: Insecta
- Order: Lepidoptera
- Family: Hesperiidae
- Genus: Spialia
- Species: S. doris

Binomial name
- Spialia doris (Walker, 1870)

Synonyms
- Nisoniades doris Walker, 1870; Pyrgus evenidus var. adenensis Butler, 1885

= Spialia doris =

Species of butterfly

Spialia doris, the Aden skipper or desert grizzled skipper, is a butterfly of the family Hesperiidae. It is found in Morocco, Egypt, Saudi Arabia, United Arab Emirates, Somalia and India. In the Atlas Mountains it is found at heights of 400 to 1,750 meters above sea-level.

The wingspan is 22–26 mm. Adults are on wing from March to May and from August to September in two generations.

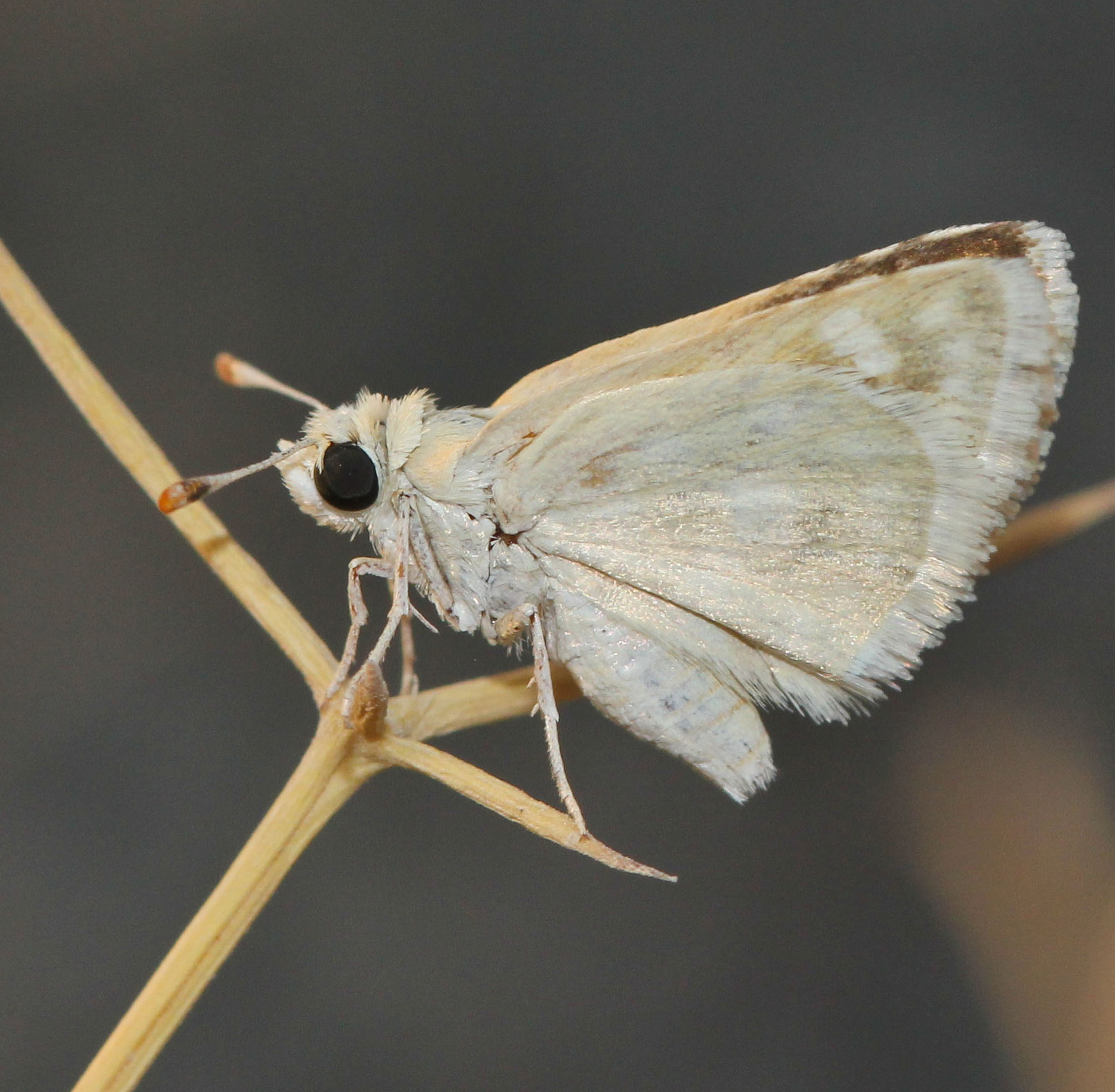
Spialia doris (Dry season form) from United Arab Emirates

The larvae feed on Convolvolus lanatus, Convolvolus caputmedusae, Convolvolus trabutianus and Ipomoea species.

== Subspecies ==
- Spialia doris doris (Sudan, northern Kenya, Somalia, Djibouti, Saudi Arabia, Yemen, Oman, Arabia, southern Iran, Pakistan)
- Spialia doris amenophis (Reverdin, 1914) (northern Egypt: Nile Valley)
- Spialia doris daphne Evans, 1949 (Mauritania, south-western Morocco)
- Spialia doris evanida (Butler, 1880) (southern Turkmenia, southern Uzbekistan)
