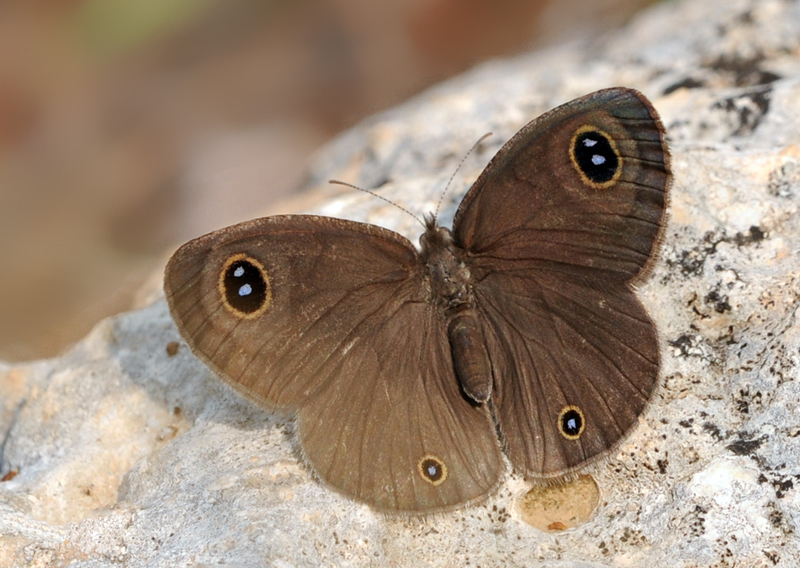
- Dorsal view of nominate race in Turkey
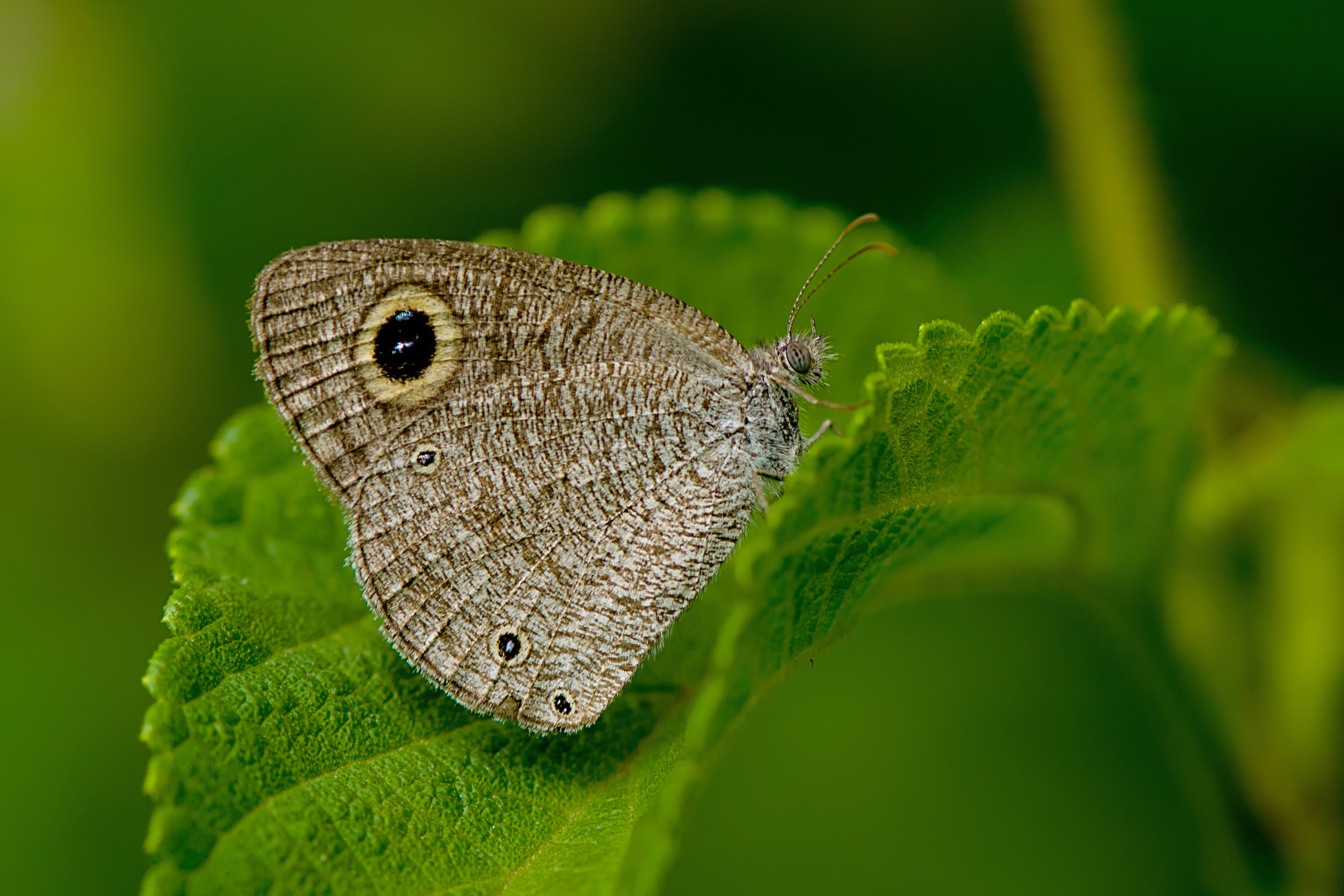
- Y. a. mahratta in southern India

Scientific classification
- Domain: Eukaryota
- Kingdom: Animalia
- Phylum: Arthropoda
- Class: Insecta
- Order: Lepidoptera
- Family: Nymphalidae
- Genus: Ypthima
- Species: Y. asterope

Binomial name
- Ypthima asterope (Klug, 1832)

Synonyms
- Hipparchia asterope Klug, 1832; Ypthima mahratta; Ypthima hereroica; Ypthima asterope ab. simpliciocellata Strand, 1909; Ypthima asterope ab. hereroica Grünberg, 1910

= Ypthima asterope =

African ringlet

Species of butterfly

Ypthima asterope, the African ringlet or common three-ring, is a species of Satyrinae butterfly found in most dry areas of Africa and Asia.

The wingspan is 30–34 mm in males and 32–38 mm in females. Adults are on wing year round with peaks in summer and autumn in southern Africa. There is one generation per year.

The larvae feed on grasses (Poaceae). Larvae have been reared on Ehrharta erecta.

== Subspecies ==
The species may be divided into the following subspecies:

- Ypthima asterope asterope (Arabia, Turkey, northern tropical Africa)
- Ypthima asterope mahratta Moore, 1884 (India)
- Ypthima asterope hereroica van Son, 1955 (southern Africa, Namibia)
