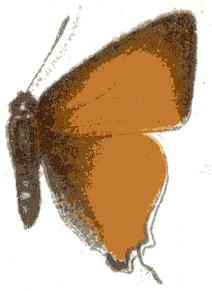
- Male
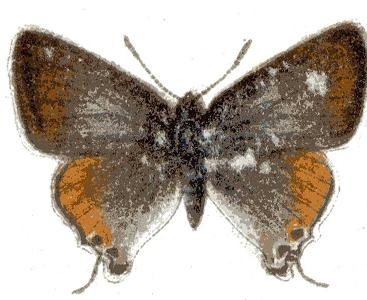
- Female

Scientific classification
- Kingdom: Animalia
- Phylum: Arthropoda
- Clade: Pancrustacea
- Class: Insecta
- Order: Lepidoptera
- Family: Lycaenidae
- Genus: Deudorix
- Species: D. livia

Binomial name
- Deudorix livia (Klug, 1834)

Synonyms
- Lycaena livia Klug, 1834; Deudorix (Virachola) livia; Virachola livia pallescens Rothschild, 1921

= Deudorix livia =

Pomegranate playboy

Species of butterfly

Deudorix livia, the pomegranate playboy, is a butterfly in the family Lycaenidae. It is found in Senegal, the Gambia, Burkina Faso, Cameroon, Chad, Sudan, Uganda, Kenya, Tanzania, Somalia, Djibouti, Yemen, Saudi Arabia, United Arab Emirates, Oman, Algeria, Egypt and the eastern Mediterranean, including Greece. The habitat consists of savanna, including arid savanna.

It is a somewhat migratory species. The larvae feed on Punica granatum, Eriobotrya japonica, Acacia, Phoenix, Allium, Psidium, Gardenia and Lycopersicon species.

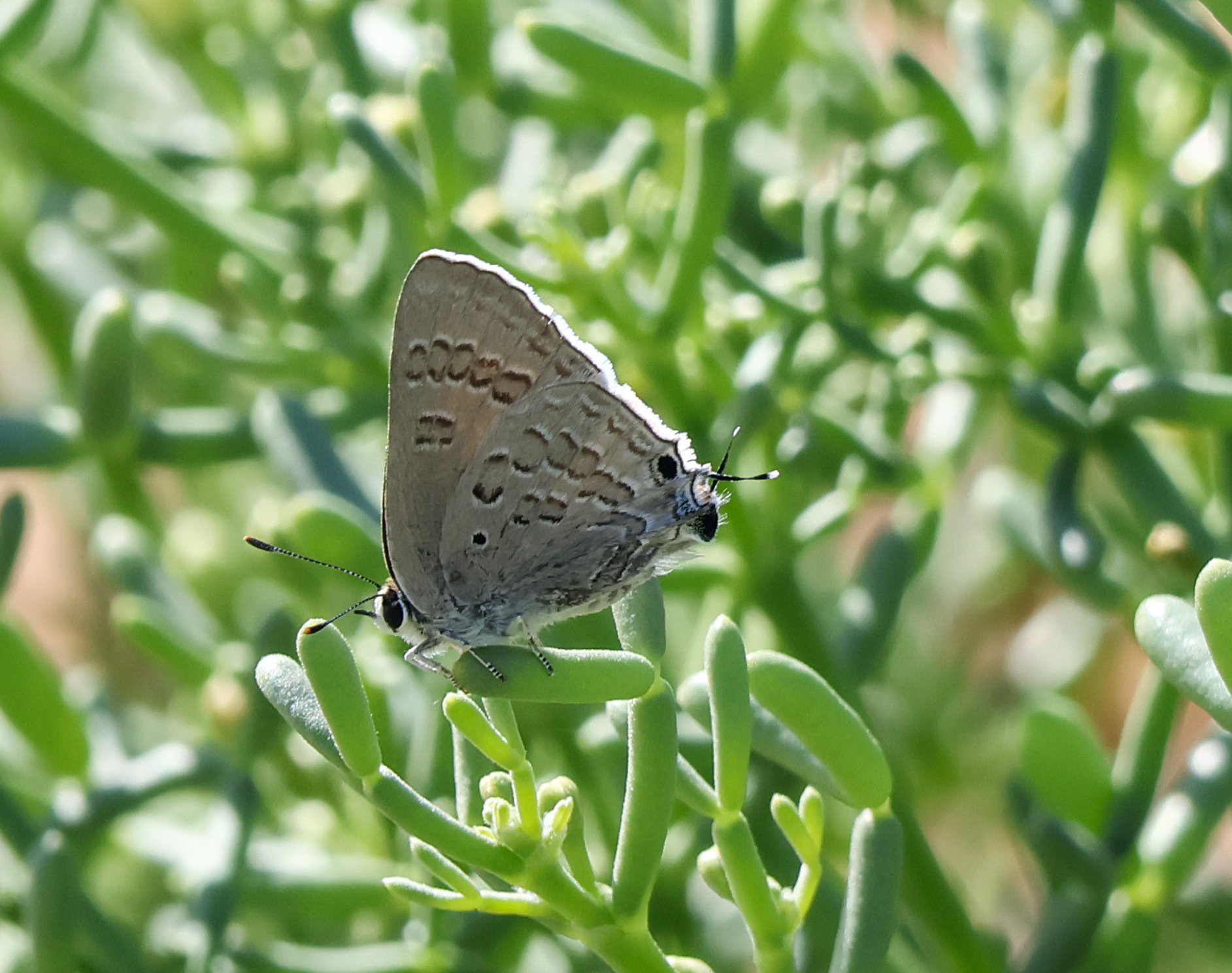
Pomegranate playboy from Saudi Arabia

== Subspecies ==
- Deudorix livia livia (northern Senegal, the Gambia, Burkina Faso, northern Cameroon, Chad, Sudan, northern Uganda, northern and central Kenya, north-central Tanzania, Somalia, Djibouti, Yemen, Saudi Arabia, Oman, Egypt, eastern Mediterranean)
- Deudorix livia barnetti Libert, 2005 (Oman), United Arab Emirates
