= Lists of Lepidoptera by region =

The following are the regional Lepidoptera lists by continent. Lepidoptera is the insect order consisting of both the butterflies and moths.

Lepidoptera are among the most successful groups of insects. They are found on all continents, except Antarctica. Lepidoptera inhabit all terrestrial habitats ranging from desert to rainforest, from lowland grasslands to montane plateaus but almost always associated with higher plants, especially angiosperms (flowering plants). Among the most northern dwelling species of butterflies and moths is the Arctic Apollo (Parnassius arcticus), which is found in the Arctic Circle in northeastern Yakutia, at an altitude of 1500 meters above sea level. In the Himalayas, various Apollo species such as Parnassius epaphus, have been recorded to occur up to an altitude of 6,000 meters above sea level.

Some lepidopteran species exhibit symbiotic, phoretic, or parasitic life-styles, inhabiting the bodies of organisms rather than the environment. Coprophagous pyralid moth species, called sloth moths, such as Bradipodicola hahneli and Cryptoses choloepi, are unusual in that they are exclusively found inhabiting the fur of sloths, mammals found in Central and South America. Two species of Tinea moths have been recorded as feeding on horny tissue and have been bred from the horns of cattle. The larva of Zenodochium coccivorella is an internal parasite of the coccid Kermes species. Many species have been recorded as breeding in natural materials or refuse such as owl pellets, bat caves, honey-combs or diseased fruit.

Of the approximately 174,250 lepidopteran species described until 2007, butterflies and skippers are estimated to comprise approximately 17,950, with moths making up the rest. The vast majority of Lepidoptera are to be found in the tropics, but substantial diversity exists on most continents. North America has over 700 species of butterflies and over 11,000 species of moths, while there are about 400 species of butterflies and 14,000 species of moths reported from Australia. The diversity of Lepidoptera in each faunal region has been estimated by John Heppner in 1991 based partly on actual counts from the literature, partly on the card indices in the Natural History Museum (London) and the National Museum of Natural History (Washington), and partly on estimates:

Diversity of Lepidoptera in each faunal region
	Palearctic	Nearctic	Neotropic	Afrotropic	Indo-Australian (comprising Indomalayan and Australasian realms)
Estimated number of species	22,465	11,532	44,791	20,491	47,286

== Species by continent ==
=== Africa ===
Flag	Country or territory	Moths	Butterflies
Algeria	Algeria	Moths	Butterflies
Angola	Angola	Moths	Butterflies
Benin	Benin	Moths	Butterflies
Botswana	Botswana	Moths	Butterflies
Burkina Faso	Burkina Faso	Moths	Butterflies
Burundi	Burundi	Moths	Butterflies
Cameroon	Cameroon	Moths	Butterflies
Canary Islands	Canary Islands (Autonomous community of Spain)	Moths	Butterflies
Cape Verde	Cape Verde	Moths	Butterflies
Central African Republic	Central African Republic	Moths	Butterflies
Chad	Chad	Moths	Butterflies
Comoros	Comoros	Moths	Butterflies
Democratic Republic of the Congo	Congo, Democratic Republic of (Congo-Kinshasa)	Moths	Butterflies
Republic of the Congo	Congo, Republic of (Congo-Brazzaville)	Moths	Butterflies
Djibouti	Djibouti	Moths	Butterflies
Egypt	Egypt	Moths	Butterflies
Equatorial Guinea	Equatorial Guinea	Moths	Butterflies
Eritrea	Eritrea	Moths	Butterflies
Ethiopia	Ethiopia	Moths	Butterflies
Gabon	Gabon	Moths	Butterflies
The Gambia	Gambia	Moths	Butterflies
Ghana	Ghana	Moths	Butterflies
Guinea	Guinea	Moths	Butterflies
Guinea-Bissau	Guinea-Bissau	Moths	Butterflies
Ivory Coast	Ivory Coast (Côte d'Ivoire)	Moths	Butterflies
Kenya	Kenya	Moths	Butterflies
Lesotho	Lesotho	Moths	Butterflies
Liberia	Liberia	Moths	Butterflies
Libya	Libya	Moths	Butterflies
Madagascar	Madagascar	Moths	Butterflies
Malawi	Malawi	Moths	Butterflies
Mali	Mali	Moths	Butterflies
Mauritania	Mauritania	Moths	Butterflies
Mauritius	Mauritius	Moths	Butterflies
Mayotte	Mayotte (Overseas territory of France)	Moths	Butterflies
Morocco	Morocco	Moths	Butterflies
Mozambique	Mozambique	Moths	Butterflies
Namibia	Namibia	Moths	Butterflies
Niger	Niger	Moths	Butterflies
Nigeria	Nigeria	Moths	Butterflies
Réunion	Réunion (Overseas department of France)	Moths	Butterflies
Rwanda	Rwanda	Moths	Butterflies
Saint Helena, Ascension and Tristan da Cunha	Saint Helena, Ascension and Tristan da Cunha (Overseas territory of the United Kingdom)	Moths	Butterflies
São Tomé and Príncipe	São Tomé and Príncipe	Moths	Butterflies
	Selvagens Islands (Part of the parish of Sé of Portugal)	Moths	Butterflies
Senegal	Senegal	Moths	Butterflies
Seychelles	Seychelles	Moths	Butterflies
Sierra Leone	Sierra Leone	Moths	Butterflies
Somalia	Somalia	Moths	Butterflies
South Africa	South Africa	Moths	Butterflies
Sudan	Sudan	Moths	Butterflies
Eswatini	Swaziland	Moths	Butterflies
Tanzania	Tanzania	Moths	Butterflies
Togo	Togo	Moths	Butterflies
Tunisia	Tunisia	Moths	Butterflies
Uganda	Uganda	Moths	Butterflies
Zambia	Zambia	Moths	Butterflies
Zimbabwe	Zimbabwe	Moths	Butterflies

=== Asia ===
Flag	Country or territory	Moths	Butterflies
Abkhazia	Abkhazia (Note: The following countries and territories are also often considered as European: Armenia, Azerbaijan, Cyprus, Georgia, and Turkey, classified as Asian countries by the United Nations Statistics Division, are also often considered as European countries, since their territories are either partly in Europe or in the vicinity of Europe (for the geographical boundaries between Asia and Europe, see here), and they have close political and historical ties with Europe (e.g., they are members of the Council of Europe).; Abkhazia, Nagorno-Karabakh, Northern Cyprus, and South Ossetia, all sovereign states lacking general international recognition, are also often considered as European countries.; Akrotiri and Dhekelia is also often considered as a European territory.)	Moths	Butterflies
Afghanistan	Afghanistan	Moths	Butterflies
Akrotiri and Dhekelia	Akrotiri and Dhekelia (Overseas territory of the United Kingdom located on Cyprus)	Moths	Butterflies
Armenia	Armenia	Moths	Butterflies
Azerbaijan	Azerbaijan	Moths	Butterflies
Bahrain	Bahrain	Moths	Butterflies
Bangladesh	Bangladesh	Moths	Butterflies
Bhutan	Bhutan	Moths	Butterflies
British Indian Ocean Territory	British Indian Ocean Territory (Note: The British Indian Ocean Territory is sometimes considered as an African territory, since it was historically part of Mauritius.) (Overseas territory of the United Kingdom)	Moths	Butterflies
Brunei	Brunei	Moths	Butterflies
Cambodia	Cambodia	Moths	Butterflies
China	China	Moths	Butterflies
Christmas Island	Christmas Island (Note: Christmas Island and Cocos (Keeling) Islands are sometimes considered as Oceanian territories, since they are dependent territories of Australia.) (External territory of Australia)	Moths	Butterflies
Cocos (Keeling) Islands	Cocos (Keeling) Islands (External territory of Australia)	Moths	Butterflies
Cyprus	Cyprus	Moths	Butterflies
Georgia (country)	Georgia	Moths	Butterflies
India	India	Moths	Butterflies; Butterflies of the Western Ghats
Indonesia	Indonesia	Moths	Butterflies; Butterflies of Sulawesi
Iran	Iran	Moths	Butterflies
Iraq	Iraq	Moths	Butterflies
Israel	Israel	Moths	Butterflies
Japan	Japan	Moths	Butterflies
Jordan	Jordan	Moths	Butterflies
Kazakhstan	Kazakhstan	Moths	Butterflies
North Korea	Korea, Democratic People's Republic of (North Korea)	Moths	Butterflies
South Korea	Korea, Republic of (South Korea)	Moths	Butterflies
Kuwait	Kuwait	Moths	Butterflies
Kyrgyzstan	Kyrgyzstan	Moths	Butterflies
Laos	Laos	Moths	Butterflies
Lebanon	Lebanon	Moths	Butterflies
Malaysia	Malaysia	Moths	Butterflies; Butterflies of Peninsular Malaysia
Maldives	Maldives	Moths	Butterflies
Mongolia	Mongolia	Moths	Butterflies
Myanmar	Myanmar (Burma)	Moths	Butterflies
Nepal	Nepal	Moths	Butterflies
Oman	Oman	Moths	Butterflies
Pakistan	Pakistan	Moths	Butterflies
Palestinian Authority	Palestinian territories	Moths	Butterflies
Philippines	Philippines	Moths	Butterflies
Qatar	Qatar	Moths	Butterflies
Saudi Arabia	Saudi Arabia	Moths	Butterflies
Singapore	Singapore	Moths	Butterflies
Sri Lanka	Sri Lanka	Moths	Butterflies
Syria	Syria	Moths	Butterflies
Taiwan	Taiwan	Moths	Butterflies
Tajikistan	Tajikistan	Moths	Butterflies
Thailand	Thailand	Moths	Butterflies
Timor-Leste	Timor-Leste (East Timor)	Moths	Butterflies
Turkey	Turkey	Moths	Butterflies
Turkmenistan	Turkmenistan	Moths	Butterflies
United Arab Emirates	United Arab Emirates	Moths	Butterflies
Uzbekistan	Uzbekistan	Moths	Butterflies
Vietnam	Vietnam	Moths	Butterflies
Yemen	Yemen	Moths	Butterflies

=== Europe ===
Flag	Country or territory	Moths	Butterflies
Albania	Albania	Moths	Butterflies
Andorra	Andorra	Moths	Butterflies
Austria	Austria	Moths	Butterflies
Azores	Azores	Moths	Butterflies
Belarus	Belarus	Moths	Butterflies
Belgium	Belgium	Moths	Butterflies
Bosnia and Herzegovina	Bosnia and Herzegovina	Moths	Butterflies
Bulgaria	Bulgaria	Moths	Butterflies
Croatia	Croatia	Moths	Butterflies
Czech Republic	Czech Republic	Moths	Butterflies
Denmark	Denmark	Moths	Butterflies
Estonia	Estonia	Moths	Butterflies
Faroe Islands	Faroe Islands	Moths	Butterflies
Finland	Finland	Moths	Butterflies
France	France	Moths	Butterflies
Germany	Germany	Moths	Butterflies
Greece	Greece	Moths	Butterflies
Hungary	Hungary	Moths	Butterflies
Iceland	Iceland	Moths	Butterflies
Republic of Ireland	Ireland	Moths	Butterflies
Italy	Italy	Moths	Butterflies
Latvia	Latvia	Moths	Butterflies
Liechtenstein	Liechtenstein	Moths	Butterflies
Lithuania	Lithuania	Moths	Butterflies
Luxembourg	Luxembourg	Moths	Butterflies
North Macedonia	Macedonia	Moths	Butterflies
Madeira	Madeira	Moths	Butterflies
Malta	Malta	Moths	Butterflies
Moldova	Moldova	Moths	Butterflies
Montenegro	Montenegro	Moths	Butterflies
Netherlands	Netherlands	Moths	Butterflies
Norway	Norway	Moths	Butterflies
Poland	Poland	Moths	Butterflies
Portugal	Portugal	Moths	Butterflies
Romania	Romania	Moths	Butterflies
Russia	Russia (Note: Russia is generally considered as a European country more than an Asian country, even though most of its territory is in Asia, since most of its population and also its capital are in Europe, and it has close political and historical ties with Europe.)	Moths	Butterflies; Butterflies of Saint Petersburg and Leningrad Oblast
Serbia	Serbia	Moths	Butterflies
Slovakia	Slovakia	Moths	Butterflies
Slovenia	Slovenia	Moths	Butterflies
Spain	Spain	Moths	Butterflies; Butterflies of Minorca
Sweden	Sweden	Moths	Butterflies
Switzerland	Switzerland	Moths	Butterflies
Ukraine	Ukraine	Moths	Butterflies
United Kingdom	United Kingdom	Moths	Butterflies

=== North America ===
Flag	Country or territory	Moths	Butterflies
Anguilla	Anguilla	Moths	Butterflies
Antigua and Barbuda	Antigua and Barbuda	Moths	Butterflies
Aruba	Aruba (Constituent country of the Kingdom of the Netherlands)	Moths	Butterflies
The Bahamas	Bahamas	Moths	Butterflies
Barbados	Barbados	Moths	Butterflies
Belize	Belize	Moths	Butterflies
Bermuda	Bermuda (Overseas territory of the United Kingdom)	Moths	Butterflies
Bonaire	Bonaire (Special municipality of the Netherlands)	Moths	Butterflies
British Virgin Islands	British Virgin Islands (Overseas territory of the United Kingdom)	Moths	Butterflies
Canada	Canada	Moths	Butterflies
Cayman Islands	Cayman Islands (Overseas territory of the United Kingdom)	Moths	Butterflies
Clipperton Island	Clipperton Island (Overseas territory of France)	Moths	Butterflies
Costa Rica	Costa Rica	Moths	Butterflies
Cuba	Cuba	Moths	Butterflies
Curaçao	Curaçao (Constituent country of the Kingdom of the Netherlands)	Moths	Butterflies
Dominica	Dominica	Moths	Butterflies
Dominican Republic	Dominican Republic	Moths	Butterflies
El Salvador	El Salvador	Moths	Butterflies
Greenland	Greenland (Self-governing territory of Denmark)	Moths	Butterflies
Grenada	Grenada	Moths	Butterflies
Guadeloupe	Guadeloupe (Overseas department of France)	Moths	Butterflies
Guatemala	Guatemala	Moths	Butterflies
Haiti	Haiti	Moths	Butterflies
Honduras	Honduras	Moths	Butterflies
Jamaica	Jamaica	Moths	Butterflies
Martinique	Martinique (Overseas department of France)	Moths	Butterflies
Mexico	Mexico	Moths	Butterflies
Montserrat	Montserrat (Overseas territory of the United Kingdom)	Moths	Butterflies
Navassa Island	Navassa Island (Insular area of the United States of America)	Moths	Butterflies
Nicaragua	Nicaragua	Moths	Butterflies
Panama	Panama	Moths	Butterflies
Puerto Rico	Puerto Rico (Insular area of the United States of America)	Moths	Butterflies
Saba (island)	Saba (Special municipality of the Netherlands)	Moths	Butterflies
Saint Barthélemy	Saint Barthélemy (Overseas collectivity of France)	Moths	Butterflies
	Sint Eustatius (Special municipality of the Netherlands)	Moths	Butterflies
Saint Kitts and Nevis	Saint Kitts and Nevis	Moths	Butterflies
Saint Lucia	Saint Lucia	Moths	Butterflies
Collectivity of Saint Martin	Saint Martin (Overseas collectivity of France)	Moths	Butterflies
Saint Pierre and Miquelon	Saint Pierre and Miquelon (Overseas collectivity of France)	Moths	Butterflies
Saint Vincent and the Grenadines	Saint Vincent and the Grenadines	Moths	Butterflies
Sint Maarten	Sint Maarten (Constituent country of the Kingdom of the Netherlands)	Moths	Butterflies
Trinidad and Tobago	Trinidad and Tobago	Moths	Butterflies; Butterflies of Tobago
Turks and Caicos Islands	Turks and Caicos Islands (Overseas territory of the United Kingdom)	Moths	Butterflies
United States	United States of America	Moths	Butterflies
United States Virgin Islands	United States Virgin Islands (Insular area of the United States of America)	Moths	Butterflies

=== South America ===
Flag	Country or territory	Moths	Butterflies
Argentina	Argentina	Moths	Butterflies
Bolivia	Bolivia	Moths	Butterflies
Brazil	Brazil	Moths	Butterflies
Chile	Chile	Moths	Butterflies
Colombia	Colombia	Moths	Butterflies
Ecuador	Ecuador	Moths	Butterflies
Falkland Islands	Falkland Islands (Overseas territory of the United Kingdom)	Moths	Butterflies
French Guiana	French Guiana (Overseas department of France)	Moths	Butterflies
Guyana	Guyana	Moths	Butterflies
Paraguay	Paraguay	Moths	Butterflies
Peru	Peru	Moths	Butterflies
Suriname	Suriname	Moths	Butterflies
Uruguay	Uruguay	Moths	Butterflies
Venezuela	Venezuela	Moths	Butterflies

=== Oceania ===
Flag	Country or territory	Moths	Butterflies
American Samoa	American Samoa (Insular area of the United States of America)	Moths	Butterflies
Ashmore and Cartier Islands	Ashmore and Cartier Islands (External territory of Australia)	Moths	Butterflies
Australia	Australia	Moths	Butterflies; Butterflies of Tasmania; Butterflies of Victoria; Butterflies of Lord Howe Island
Baker Island	Baker Island (Insular area of the United States of America)	Moths	Butterflies
Cook Islands	Cook Islands (Territory in free association with New Zealand)	Moths	Butterflies
Coral Sea Islands	Coral Sea Islands (External territory of Australia)	Moths	Butterflies
Easter Island	Easter Island (Special Territory of Chile)	Moths	Butterflies
Fiji	Fiji	Moths	Butterflies
French Polynesia	French Polynesia (Overseas collectivity of France)	Moths	Butterflies
Guam	Guam (Insular area of the United States of America)	Moths	Butterflies
Hawaii	Hawaii (State of the United States of America)	Moths	Butterflies
Howland Island	Howland Island (Insular area of the United States of America)	Moths	Butterflies
Jarvis Island	Jarvis Island (Insular area of the United States of America)	Moths	Butterflies
Johnston Atoll	Johnston Atoll (Insular area of the United States of America)	Moths	Butterflies
Kingman Reef	Kingman Reef (Insular area of the United States of America)	Moths	Butterflies
Kiribati	Kiribati	Moths	Butterflies
Marshall Islands	Marshall Islands	Moths	Butterflies
Federated States of Micronesia	Micronesia	Moths	Butterflies
Midway Atoll	Midway Atoll (Insular area of the United States of America)	Moths	Butterflies
Nauru	Nauru	Moths	Butterflies
or	New Caledonia (Sui generis collectivity or special collectivity of France)	Moths	Butterflies
New Zealand	New Zealand	Moths	Butterflies
Niue	Niue (Territory in free association with New Zealand)	Moths	Butterflies
Norfolk Island	Norfolk Island (Self-governing territory of Australia)	Moths	Butterflies
Northern Mariana Islands	Northern Mariana Islands (Insular area of the United States of America)	Moths	Butterflies
Palau	Palau	Moths	Butterflies
Palmyra Atoll	Palmyra Atoll (Insular area of the United States of America)	Moths	Butterflies
Papua New Guinea	Papua New Guinea	Moths	Butterflies
Pitcairn Islands	Pitcairn Islands (Overseas territory of the United Kingdom)	Moths	Butterflies
Samoa	Samoa	Moths	Butterflies
Solomon Islands	Solomon Islands	Moths	Butterflies
Tokelau	Tokelau (Dependent territory of New Zealand)	Moths	Butterflies
Tonga	Tonga	Moths	Butterflies
Tuvalu	Tuvalu	Moths	Butterflies
Vanuatu	Vanuatu	Moths	Butterflies
Wake Island	Wake Island (Insular area of the United States of America)	Moths	Butterflies
Wallis and Futuna	Wallis and Futuna (Overseas collectivity of France)	Moths	Butterflies

=== Antarctica ===
No Lepidoptera species are known from the continent of Antarctica. However, there are records from nearby islands.

Flag	Country or territory	Moths	Butterflies
French Southern and Antarctic Lands	French Southern and Antarctic Lands (Overseas territory of France)	Moths	Butterflies

== See also ==
- For other Lepidoptera lists, see the categories:

- Lists of Lepidoptera by location
- Lists of Lepidoptera
- Lepidoptera by location

- Lepidoptera by continent
- Lepidoptera by country
- Lepidoptera by region
