= List of butterflies of Samoa =

Location of Samoa

Location of American Samoa

This is a list of butterflies of Samoa and American Samoa.

== Hesperiidae ==
=== Coeliadinae ===
- Badamia exclamationis (Fabricius, 1775)

=== Hesperiinae ===
- Oriens augustula alexina (Plötz, 1884)

== Papilionidae ==
=== Papilioninae ===
- Papilio godeffroyi Semper, 1866

== Pieridae ==
=== Coliadinae ===
- Eurema hecabe sulphurata (Butler, 1875)
- Belenois java schmeltzi Hopkins, 1927

== Lycaenidae ==
=== Theclinae ===
- Deudorix epijarbas doris Hopkins, 1927

=== Polyommatinae ===
- Nacaduba dyopa dyopa (Herrich-Schaeffer, 1869)
- Jamides argentina (von Prittwitz, 1867)
- Catochrysops taitensis pepe (Hopkins, 1927)
- Famegana alsulus lulu (Mathew, 1889)
- Zizina labradus mangoensis (Butler, 1884)
- Zizula hylax dampierensis (Rothschild, 1915)
- Euchrysops cnejus samoa (Herrich-Schaeffer, 1869)

== Nymphalidae ==
=== Danainae ===
- Tirumala hamata melittula (Herrich-Schaeffer, 1869)
- Tirumala hamata tutuilae (Hopkins, 1927)
- Danaus plexippus plexippus (Linnaeus, 1758)
- Euploea algea schmeltzi (Herrich-Schaeffer, 1869)
- Euploea lewinii bourkei (Poulton, 1924)

=== Satyrinae ===
- Melanitis leda hopkinsi Poulton & Riley, 1928

=== Nymphalinae ===
- Doleschallia tongana vomana (Fruhstorfer, 1902)
- Hypolimnas antilope lutescens (Butler, 1874)
- Hypolimnas errabunda Hopkins, 1927
- Hypolimnas octocula octocula (Butler, 1869)
- Hypolimnas bolina pallescens (Butler, 1874)
- Junonia villida villida (Fabricius, 1787)

=== Heliconiinae ===
- Vagrans egista bowdenia (M. R. Butler, 1874)
- Phalanta exulans (Hopkins, 1927)

=== Acraeinae ===
- Acraea andromacha polynesiaca Rebel, 1910
