= List of butterflies of Tonga =

Location of Tonga

This is a list of butterflies of Tonga.

== Hesperiidae ==
=== Coeliadinae ===
- Badamia exclamationis (Fabricius, 1775)

== Pieridae ==
=== Coliadinae ===
- Eurema hecabe sulphurata (Butler, 1875)
- Eurema brigitta australis (Wallace, 1867)

=== Pierinae ===
- Appias athama manaia (Hopkins, 1927)
- Belenois java schmeltzi Hopkins, 1927

== Lycaenidae ==
=== Theclinae ===
- Deudorix epijarbas armstrongi Hopkins, 1927

=== Polyommatinae ===
- Jamides morphoides Butler, 1884
- Jamides carissima thomasi Miller & Miller, 1993
- Catochrysops taitensis hopkinsi Miller & Miller, 1993
- Lampides boeticus (Linnaeus, 1767)
- Famegana alsulus lulu (Mathew, 1889)
- Zizina labradus mangoensis (Butler, 1884)
- Euchrysops cnejus samoa (Herrich-Schaeffer, 1869)

== Nymphalidae ==
=== Danainae ===
- Tirumala hamata angustata (Moore, 1883)
- Danaus plexippus plexippus (Linnaeus, 1758)
- Euploea tulliolus forsteri (C & R Felder, 1865)
- Euploea lewinii lewinii C & R Felder, 1865

=== Satyrinae ===
- Melanitis leda solandra (Fabricius, 1775)

=== Nymphalinae ===
- Doleschallia tongana tongana (Hopkins, 1927)
- Hypolimnas antilope lutescens (Butler, 1874)
- Hypolimnas bolina pallescens (Butler, 1874)
- Junonia villida villida (Fabricius, 1787)

=== Heliconiinae ===
- Vagrans egista bowdenia (M. R. Butler, 1874)

=== Acraeinae ===
- Acraea andromacha polynesiaca Rebel, 1910
