= List of butterflies of Niue =

Location of Niue

This is a list of butterflies of Niue.

== Pieridae ==
=== Coliadinae ===
- Eurema hecabe sulphurata (Butler, 1875)

=== Pierinae ===
- Belenois java peristhene (Boisduval, 1859)

== Lycaenidae ==
=== Polyommatinae ===
- Lampides boeticus (Linnaeus, 1767)
- Famegana alsulus lulu (Mathew, 1889)
- Zizina labradus mangoensis (Butler, 1884)

== Nymphalidae ==
=== Danainae ===
- Euploea lewinii perryi (Butler, 1874)

=== Nymphalinae ===
- Hypolimnas antilope lutescens (Butler, 1874)
- Hypolimnas bolina otaheitae (C Felder, 1862)
