= List of butterflies of the Northern Mariana Islands =

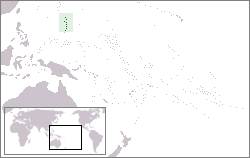
Location of the Northern Mariana Islands

This is a list of butterflies of the Northern Mariana Islands.

== Hesperiidae ==
=== Hesperiinae ===
- Erionota thrax (Linnaeus, 1767)

== Papilionidae ==
=== Papilioninae ===
- Papilio xuthus Linnaeus, 1767
- Papilio polytes palewensis Nakamura, 1933

== Pieridae ==
=== Coliadinae ===
- Catopsilia pomona (Fabricius, 1775)
- Eurema blanda kishidai Yata, 1994

== Lycaenidae ==
=== Polyommatinae ===
- Lampides boeticus (Linnaeus, 1767)
- Zizula hylax dampierensis (Rothschild, 1915)
- Luthrodes pandava (Horsfield, 1829)

== Nymphalidae ==
=== Danainae ===
- Tirumala hamata hamata (Macleay, 1826)
- Danaus plexippus plexippus (Linnaeus, 1758)
- Euploea eunice kadu (von Eschscholtz, 1821)
- Euploea algea eleutho (Quoy & Gaimard, 1824)

=== Satyrinae ===
- Melanitis leda ponapensis Mathew, 1889
- Ypthima baldus evanescens (Butler, 1881)

=== Nymphalinae ===
- Hypolimnas antilope anomala (Wallace, 1869)
- Hypolimnas octocula marianensis Fruhstorfer, 1912
- Hypolimnas bolina nerina (Fabricius, 1775)

=== Heliconiinae ===
- Vagrans egestina (Quoy & Gaimard, 1824)
