= List of butterflies of Palau =

This is a list of butterflies of Palau.

== Hesperiidae ==
=== Coeliadinae ===
- Badamia exclamationis (Fabricius, 1775)
- Hasora chromus chromus (Cramer, 1780)

=== Hesperiinae ===
- Parnara bada (Moore, 1878)

== Papilionidae ==
=== Papilioninae ===
- Graphium agamemnon enoplus Jordan, 1909
- Papilio polytes palewensis Nakamura, 1933

== Pieridae ==
=== Coliadinae ===
- Catopsilia pomona (Fabricius, 1775)
- Catopsilia pyranthe pyranthe (Linnaeus, 1758)
- Eurema hecabe marginata (Kishida, 1933)
- Eurema brigitta nebulosa (Kishida, 1933)

=== Pierinae ===
- Appias ada ardens (Butler, 1898)

== Lycaenidae ==
=== Theclinae ===
- Bindahara phocides isabella (C Felder, 1860)

=== Polyommatinae ===
- Petrelaea tombugensis (Röber, 1886)
- Prosotas dubiosa dubiosa (Semper, 1879)
- Jamides bochus palauensis (Fruhstorfer, 1915)
- Catochrysops panormus papuana Tite, 1959
- Lampides boeticus (Linnaeus, 1767)
- Leptotes plinius pseudocassius (Murray, 1873)
- Everes lacturnus pulchra (Rothschild, 1915)
- Acytolepis puspa watasei (Matsumura, 1915)
- Euchrysops cnejus cnidus Waterhouse and Lyell, 1914

== Nymphalidae ==
=== Danainae ===
- Danaus affinis rubrica (Fruhstorfer, 1907)
- Danaus plexippus plexippus (Linnaeus, 1758)
- Euploea eunice kadu (von Eschscholtz, 1821)
- Euploea algea abjecta (Butler, 1866)

=== Satyrinae ===
- Melanitis leda ponapensis Mathew, 1889

=== Nymphalinae ===
- Hypolimnas antilope anomala (Wallace, 1869)
- Hypolimnas octocula arakalulk (Semper, 1906)
- Hypolimnas bolina nerina (Fabricius, 1775)
- Hypolimnas misippus (Linnaeus, 1764)
- Junonia villida villida (Fabricius, 1787)
- Junonia hedonia zelima (Fabricius, 1775)

=== Heliconiinae ===
- Vagrans egista brixia (Fruhstorfer, 1912)
- Phalanta exulans (Hopkins, 1927)
