= List of butterflies of Guam =

Location of Guam

This is a list of butterflies of Guam.

== Hesperiidae ==
=== Coeliadinae ===
- Badamia exclamationis (Fabricius, 1775)
- Hasora chromus chromus (Cramer, 1780)

=== Hesperiinae ===
- Erionota thrax (Linnaeus, 1767)
- Taractrocera luzonensis (Staudinger, 1889)

== Papilionidae ==
=== Papilioninae ===
- Papilio polytes palewensis Nakamura, 1933

== Pieridae ==
=== Coliadinae ===
- Catopsilia pomona (Fabricius, 1775)

== Lycaenidae ==
=== Polyommatinae ===
- Catochrysops panormus papuana Tite, 1959
- Lampides boeticus (Linnaeus, 1767)
- Zizula hylax dampierensis (Rothschild, 1915)

== Nymphalidae ==
=== Danainae ===
- Danaus plexippus plexippus (Linnaeus, 1758)
- Euploea eunice kadu (von Eschscholtz, 1821)
- Euploea algea eleutho (Quoy & Gaimard, 1824)

=== Satyrinae ===
- Melanitis leda ponapensis Mathew, 1889

=== Limenitidinae ===
- Neptis hylas guamensis (Swinhoe, 1916)

=== Nymphalinae ===
- Hypolimnas bolina nerina (Fabricius, 1775)

=== Heliconiinae ===
- Vagrans egestina (Quoy & Gaimard, 1824)
