= List of butterflies of the Federated States of Micronesia =

Location of the Federated States of Micronesia

This is a list of butterflies of the Federated States of Micronesia.

== Hesperiidae ==
=== Coeliadinae ===
- Badamia exclamationis (Fabricius, 1775)

== Papilionidae ==
=== Papilioninae ===
- Papilio xuthus Linnaeus, 1767

== Pieridae ==
=== Coliadinae ===
- Catopsilia pomona (Fabricius, 1775)
- Catopsilia pyranthe pyranthe (Linnaeus, 1758)
- Eurema hecabe marginata (Kishida, 1933)

=== Pierinae ===
- Appias ada ardens (Butler, 1898)

== Lycaenidae ==
=== Polyommatinae ===
- Catopyrops keiria keiria (Druce, 1891)
- Jamides bochus palauensis (Fruhstorfer, 1915)
- Catochrysops panormus papuana Tite, 1959
- Lampides boeticus (Linnaeus, 1767)
- Zizina labradus lampra (Tite, 1969)
- Zizula hylax dampierensis (Rothschild, 1915)
- Everes lacturnus pulchra (Rothschild, 1915)
- Acytolepis puspa watasei (Matsumura, 1915)
- Euchrysops cnejus cnidus Waterhouse and Lyell, 1914

== Nymphalidae ==
=== Danainae ===
- Danaus affinis rubrica (Fruhstorfer, 1907)
- Danaus plexippus plexippus (Linnaeus, 1758)
- Euploea eunice kadu (von Eschscholtz, 1821)

=== Satyrinae ===
- Melanitis leda ponapensis Mathew, 1889

=== Nymphalinae ===
- Hypolimnas antilope anomala (Wallace, 1869)
- Hypolimnas pithoeka pithoeka Kirsch, 1877
- Hypolimnas bolina nerina (Fabricius, 1775)
- Hypolimnas misippus (Linnaeus, 1764)
- Junonia villida villida (Fabricius, 1787)
- Junonia orithya (Linnaeus, 1758)
