= King crow =

King crow or King Crow may refer to:

- Black drongo, a bird found in Asia
- Euploea klugii, a butterfly found in India and Southeast Asia
- Jon Snow (character), a fictional character from A Song of Ice and Fire

== See also ==
- Crow (disambiguation)
