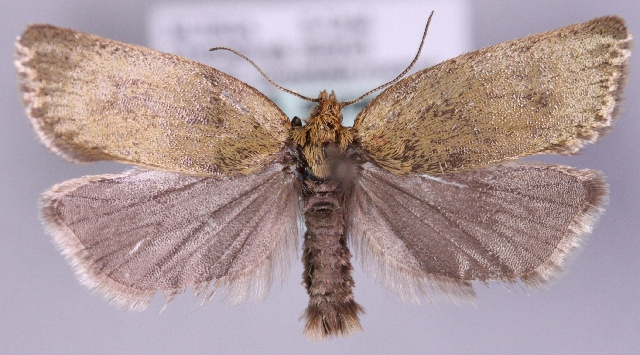

Scientific classification
- Kingdom: Animalia
- Phylum: Arthropoda
- Clade: Pancrustacea
- Class: Insecta
- Order: Lepidoptera
- Family: Tortricidae
- Genus: Clepsis
- Species: C. rogana

Binomial name
- Clepsis rogana (Guenee, 1845)

Synonyms
- Tortrix rogana Guenee, 1845; Tortrix (Lozotaenia) dohrniana Herrich-Schaffer, 1856; lusana Herrich-Schaffer, 1848; Tortrix lusana Herrich-Schaffer, 1851

= Clepsis rogana =

Species of moth

Clepsis rogana is a species of moth of the family Tortricidae. It is found in Spain, France, Germany, Austria, Switzerland, Italy, the Czech Republic, Slovakia, Poland, Romania, Russia, Finland, Estonia and the Near East.

The wingspan is 20–22 mm. Adults have been recorded on wing from June to August.

The larvae are polyphagous and have been recorded feeding on Vaccinium and Luzula species, as well as Veratrum album. They feed between the rolled leaves of their host plant.

== See also ==
- Lists of Lepidoptera by region
