= List of Lepidoptera of Easter Island =

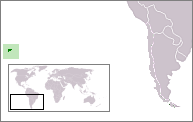
Location of Easter Island

The Lepidoptera of Easter Island consist of the butterflies and moths recorded from Easter Island.

== Butterflies ==
=== Nymphalidae ===
- Hypolimnas bolina otaheitae (C. Felder, 1862)
- Vanessa carye (Hübner, 1812)

== Moths ==
=== Cosmopterigidae ===
- Asymphorodes trichogramma (J.F.G. Clarke, 1986)

=== Gelechiidae ===
- Sitotroga cerealella (Olivier, 1789)

=== Geometridae ===
- Gymnoscelis concinna (Swinhoe, 1902)

=== Noctuidae ===
- Achaea janata (Linnaeus, 1758)
- Agrotis ipsilon (Hufnagel, 1766)
- Chrysodeixis eriosoma (Doubleday, 1843)
- Ctenoplusia albostriata (Bremer & Grey, 1853)

=== Pterophoridae ===
- Stenoptilia species

=== Pyralidae ===
- Ephestia cautella (Walker, 1863)
- Hymenia recurvalis (Fabricius, 1775)

=== Tineidae ===
- Opogona aurisquamosa (Butler, 1881)

=== Tortricidae ===
- Crocidosema plebejana (Zeller, 1847)

=== Yponomeutidae ===
- Plutella xylostella (Linnaeus, 1758)
