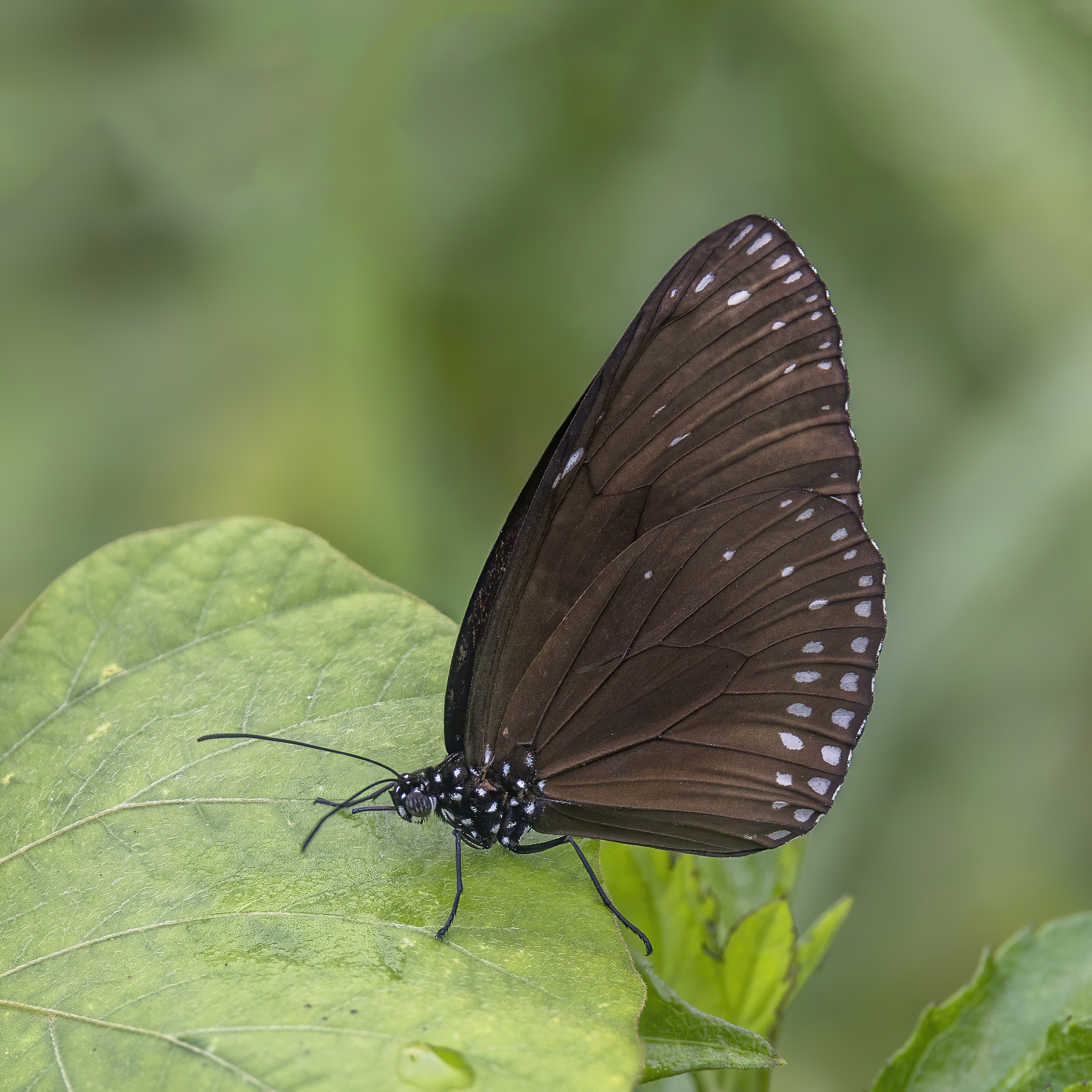
- E. k. erichsonii, Thailand

Scientific classification
- Kingdom: Animalia
- Phylum: Arthropoda
- Clade: Pancrustacea
- Class: Insecta
- Order: Lepidoptera
- Family: Nymphalidae
- Genus: Euploea
- Species: E. klugii

Binomial name
- Euploea klugii Moore, 1858

= Euploea klugii =

Brown king crow

Species of butterfly

Euploea klugii, the brown king crow or king crow, is a butterfly from the family Nymphalidae found in India and Southeast Asia. The species was first described by the entomologist Frederic Moore in 1858.

== Description ==
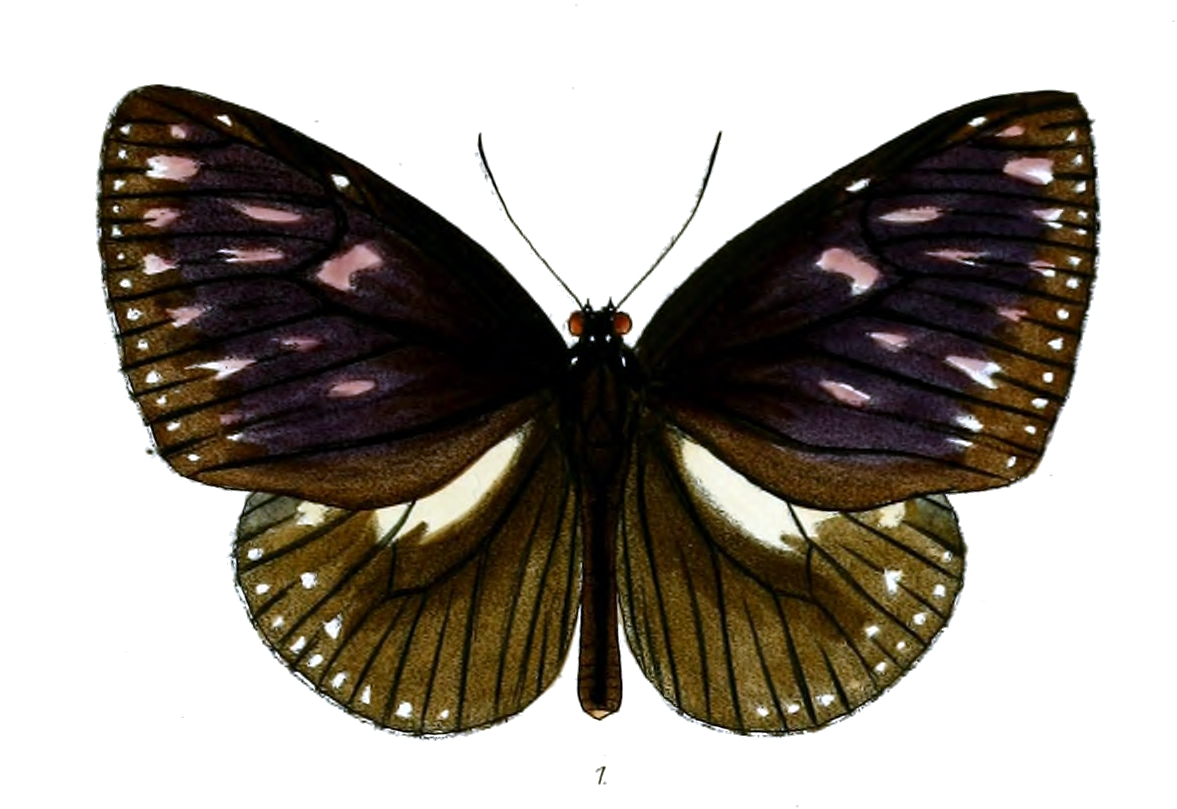

The male forewing is variable in shape, especially in the outline of the termen and dorsum. It is comparatively long in proportion to its width, owing to the lower convexity of the dorsal margin. Its termen is oblique, slightly convex. In the 'novarae' variety, it is broad, with the great convexity of the dorsal margin making it almost subquadrate, while the termen is more convex than in the typical form. In the female, the difference is less marked.

The typical form on the upper side is a dark brown forewing suffused up to the termen with a blue gloss, a spot at the apex of the cell, a small coastal spot, and two short streaks beyond the apex of the cell. In the female there are two discal spots and in the six subterminal and terminal series of spots, a second series is absent. In both sexes, the subterminal spots are produced inwards. All the spots are bluish white. Hindwing umber brown, the centre glossed with blue; subterminal rows of spots incomplete or obsolescent. The former reduced to two or three spots below the apex, the latter in the male mere dots; in the female absent, only seen by transparency from the underside.

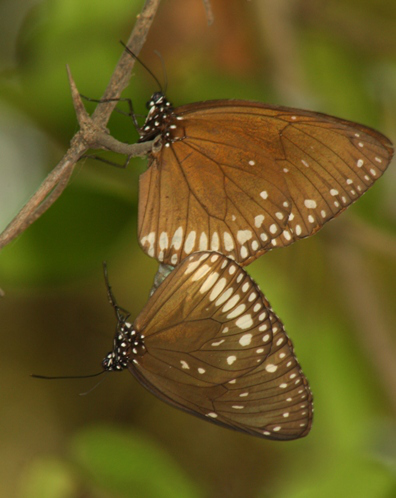
Mating

The underside is similar, but paler brown and not glossed with blue. The centre of the forewing is dark, the spots are more clearly defined, subterminal and terminal series are more or less complete. The antennae are black. The head, thorax, and abdomen are velvety brown, and the head and thorax are speckled with bluish white.

In the kollari race the upperside is very dark olive brown, paling to lighter brown towards the termen; both wings have a complete or nearly complete series of subterminal and terminal white spots, the former larger than the latter, in the forewing decreasing in size towards, and curving inwards opposite. The apex; in the hindwing, elongate oval, much larger than the terminal spots, these latter very regular, two in each interspace in the forewing, obsolete towards the apex. The underside is pale olive brown, with the spots as on the upperside, with the addition in the forewing of two to four discal spots, the largest two in the interspace, and a small costal spot; in the hindwing of one or two discal specks. Antennae very dark brown; head, thorax and abdomen dark brown, the former two speckled sparsely with white.

== Distribution ==
It is found in Peninsular India, Sri Lanka, and the Malay region. Several geographically distinct forms or subspecies have been named:

== Subspecies ==
The subspecies of Euploea klugii are:

- Euploea klugii klugii (Moore, 1857) (northern Bihar; Sikkim to north-eastern India, northern Myanmar)
- Euploea klugii erichsonii (C. & R. Felder, 1865) (southern Myanmar, northern Malaya)
- Euploea klugii kollari ( C. & R. Felder, 1865) (Gujarat eastwards to West Bengal and Odisha in India)
- Euploea klugii sinhala ( Moore, 1877) (Sri Lanka)
- Euploea klugii minorata (Moore, 1878) (Hainan)
- Euploea klugii burmeisteri (Moore, 1883) (Thailand, Indochina, south-eastern China, Hainan)

== See also ==
- Danainae
- List of butterflies of India
- List of butterflies of India (Nymphalidae)
