= List of Lepidoptera of the Pitcairn Islands =

Location of the Pitcairn Islands

The Lepidoptera of the Pitcairn Islands consist of both the butterflies and moths recorded from the Pitcairn Islands, consisting of Pitcairn, Henderson, Ducie and Oeno.

== Butterflies ==
=== Nymphalidae ===
- Hypolimnas bolina otaheitae (C Felder, 1862)

== Moths ==
=== Arctiidae ===
- Utetheisa pulchelloides Hampson, 1907

=== Cosmopterigidae ===
- Unidentified species

=== Gelechiidae ===
- Stoeberhinus testaceus Butler, 1881

=== Geometridae ===
- Anisodes niveopuncta (Warren, 1897)
- Gymnoscelis concinna Swinhoe, 1902
- Thalassodes pilaria Guenée, 1857

=== Noctuidae ===
- Achaea janata (Linnaeus, 1758)
- Anomis flava (Fabricius, 1775)
- Anomis sabulifera (Guenée, 1852)
- Anticarsia irrorata (Fabricius, 1781)
- Chrysodeixis eriosoma (Doubleday, 1843)
- Condica conducta (Walker, [1857])
- Condica illecta (Walker, 1865)
- Spodoptera litura (Fabricius, 1775)
- Targalla delatrix (Guenée, 1852)
- Tiracola plagiata (Walker, 1857)

=== Pyralidae ===
- Endotricha mesenterialis (Walker, 1859)

=== Sphingidae ===
- Agrius convolvuli (Linnaeus, 1758)
- Gnathothlibus erotus (Cramer, 1777)
- Hippotion hateleyi Holloway, 1990

=== Tineidae ===
- Erechthias species
- Opogona species
