= List of butterflies of Lord Howe Island =

Location of Lord Howe Island

This is a list of butterflies of Lord Howe Island.

== Hesperiidae ==
=== Hesperiinae ===
- Taractrocera papyria (Boisduval, 1832)

== Papilionidae ==
=== Papilioninae ===
- Graphium macleayanus insulana (Waterhouse, 1920)
- Papilio aegeus aegeus Donovan, 1805
- Papilio demoleus sthenelus (Macleay, 1826)

== Pieridae ==
=== Coliadinae ===
- Catopsilia pyranthe crokera (MacLeay, 1826)
- Eurema brigitta australis (Wallace, 1867)
- Eurema smilax smilax (Donovan, 1805)

=== Pierinae ===
- Appias paulina ega (Boisduval, 1836)
- Belenois java teutonia (Fabricius, 1775)
- Belenois java peristhene (Boisduval, 1859)

== Lycaenidae ==
=== Theclinae ===
- Lucia limbaria Swainson, 1833

=== Polyommatinae ===
- Candalides xanthospilos (Hübner, 1817)
- Lampides boeticus (Linnaeus, 1767)
- Zizina labradus labradus (Godart, 1824)
- Everes lacturnus pulchra (Rothschild, 1915)
- Danaus plexippus plexippus (Linnaeus, 1758)
- Euploea corinna (Macleay, 1826)

== Nymphalidae ==
=== Satyrinae ===
- Melanitis leda bankia (Fabricius, 1775)

=== Danainae ===
- Danaus petilia (Stoll, 1790)

=== Charaxinae ===
- Polyura sempronius tiberius (Waterhouse, 1920)
- Hypolimnas bolina nerina (Fabricius, 1775)
- Junonia villida calybe (Godart, 1819)
- Cynthia kershawi McCoy, 1868
- Bassaris itea (Fabricius, 1775)
