= List of butterflies of Mauritania =

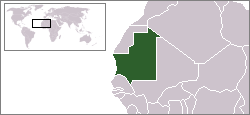
Location of Mauritania

This is a list of butterflies of Mauritania. About 30 species are known from Mauritania, none of which are endemic.

== Papilionidae ==
=== Papilioninae ===
==== Papilionini ====
- Papilio demodocus Esper, [1798]

== Pieridae ==
=== Pierinae ===
- Colotis amata calais (Cramer, 1775)
- Colotis antevippe (Boisduval, 1836)
- Colotis aurora evarne (Klug, 1829)
- Colotis chrysonome (Klug, 1829)
- Colotis danae eupompe (Klug, 1829)
- Colotis liagore (Klug, 1829)
- Colotis phisadia (Godart, 1819)
- Colotis vesta amelia (Lucas, 1852)
- Colotis eris (Klug, 1829)
- Pinacopterix eriphia tritogenia (Klug, 1829)
- Euchloe falloui (Allard, 1867)

==== Pierini ====
- Pontia daplidice (Linnaeus, 1758)
- Pontia glauconome Klug, 1829
- Belenois aurota (Fabricius, 1793)
- Belenois gidica (Godart, 1819)

== Lycaenidae ==
=== Theclinae ===
==== Theclini ====
- Hypolycaena philippus (Fabricius, 1793)

=== Polyommatinae ===
==== Lycaenesthini ====
- Anthene kikuyu (Bethune-Baker, 1910)

==== Polyommatini ====
- Cupidopsis jobates mauritanica Riley, 1932
- Tarucus balkanicus (Freyer, 1843)
- Tarucus rosacea (Austaut, 1885)
- Zizeeria knysna (Trimen, 1862)
- Euchrysops malathana (Boisduval, 1833)

== Nymphalidae ==
=== Danainae ===
==== Danaini ====
- Danaus chrysippus alcippus (Cramer, 1777)

=== Limenitinae ===
==== Adoliadini ====
- Hamanumida daedalus (Fabricius, 1775)

== Hesperiidae ==
=== Coeliadinae ===
- Coeliades forestan (Stoll, [1782])

=== Pyrginae ===
==== Celaenorrhinini ====
- Sarangesa laelius (Mabille, 1877)

==== Carcharodini ====
- Spialia doris daphne Evans, 1949
- Spialia spio (Linnaeus, 1764)

=== Hesperiinae ===
==== Baorini ====
- Borbo borbonica (Boisduval, 1833)

== See also ==
- List of moths of Mauritania
- Wildlife of Mauritania
