= List of butterflies of Djibouti =

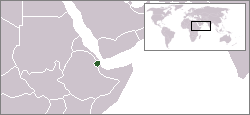
Location of Djibouti

This is a list of butterflies of Djibouti. About nine species are known from Djibouti, none of which are endemic.

== Pieridae ==
=== Pierinae ===
- Colotis danae eupompe (Klug, 1829)
- Colotis halimede (Klug, 1829)

== Lycaenidae ==
=== Theclinae ===
==== Theclini ====
- Iolaus tajoraca Walker, 1870
- Deudorix livia (Klug, 1834)

=== Polyommatinae ===
==== Polyommatini ====
- Tarucus rosacea (Austaut, 1885)

== Nymphalidae ==
=== Satyrinae ===
==== Satyrini ====
- Ypthima asterope (Klug, 1832)

=== Nymphalinae ===
==== Nymphalini ====
- Hypolimnas bolina jacintha (Drury, [1773])

== Hesperiidae ==
=== Pyrginae ===
==== Tagiadini ====
- Caprona pillaana Wallengren, 1857

==== Carcharodini ====
- Spialia doris (Walker, 1870)
