= List of butterflies of Egypt =

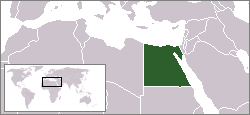
Location of Egypt

This is a list of butterflies of Egypt. About 63 species are known from Egypt, two of which are endemic.

== Papilionidae ==
- Papilio saharae

== Pieridae ==
- Belenois aurota
- Calopieris eulimene
- Catopsilia florella
- Colias croceus
- Colotis chrysonome
- Colotis danae
- Colotis fausta
- Colotis liagore
- Colotis phisadia
- Colotis protomedia
- Elphinstonia charlonia
- Euchloe aegyptiaca
- Euchloe belemia
- Euchloe falloui
- Pieris brassicae
- Pieris rapae
- Pontia daplidice
- Pontia glauconome
- Zegris eupheme

== Lycaenidae ==
- Anthene amarah
- Azanus jesous
- Azanus ubaldus
- Chilades eleusis
- Cigaritis acamas
- Cigaritis myrmecophila
- Deudorix livia
- Freyeria trochylus
- Iolana alfierii
- Kretania philbyi
- Lampides boeticus
- Leptotes pirithous
- Luthrodes pandava
- Lycaena phlaeas
- Lycaena thersamon
- Plebejidea loewii
- Polyommatus icarus
- Pseudophilotes abencerragus
- Pseudophilotes sinaicus
- Satyrium jebelia
- Tarucus balkanicus
- Tarucus rosacea
- Tomares ballus
- Zizeeria karsandra
- Zizina otis

== Nymphalidae ==
- Charaxes hansali
- Chazara persephone
- Danaus chrysippus
- Hypolimnas misippus
- Junonia hierta
- Melitaea deserticola
- Melitaea trivia
- Pseudotergumia pisidice
- Vanessa atalanta
- Vanessa cardui

== Hesperiidae ==
- Borbo borbonica
- Carcharodus alceae
- Carcharodus stauderi ambigua
- Carcharodus stauderi ramses
- Gegenes nostrodamus
- Gomalia elma
- Pelopidas thrax
- Sarangesa phidyle
- Spialia doris doris
- Spialia doris amenophis
