= List of butterflies of Norfolk Island =

Location of Norfolk Island

This is a list of butterflies of Norfolk Island.

== Papilionidae ==
=== Papilioninae ===
- Graphium macleayanus insulana (Waterhouse, 1920)
- Papilio aegeus aegeus Donovan, 1805
- Papilio amynthor amphiaraus (C & R Felder, 1864)

== Pieridae ==
=== Pierinae ===
- Cepora perimale perimale (Donovan, 1805)
- Belenois java peristhene (Boisduval, 1859)

== Lycaenidae ==
=== Polyommatinae ===
- Lampides boeticus (Linnaeus, 1767)
- Zizina labradus labradus (Godart, 1824)

== Nymphalidae ==
=== Danainae ===
- Tirumala hamata hamata (Macleay, 1826)
- Danaus petilia (Stoll, 1790)
- Danaus plexippus plexippus (Linnaeus, 1758)
- Euploea corinna (Macleay, 1826)

=== Satyrinae ===
- Melanitis leda bankia (Fabricius, 1775)

=== Nymphalinae ===
- Hypolimnas bolina nerina (Fabricius, 1775)
- Hypolimnas misippus (Linnaeus, 1764)
- Junonia villida calybe (Godart, 1819)
- Cynthia kershawi McCoy, 1868
- Bassaris itea (Fabricius, 1775)
