= List of Lepidoptera of the Selvagens Islands =

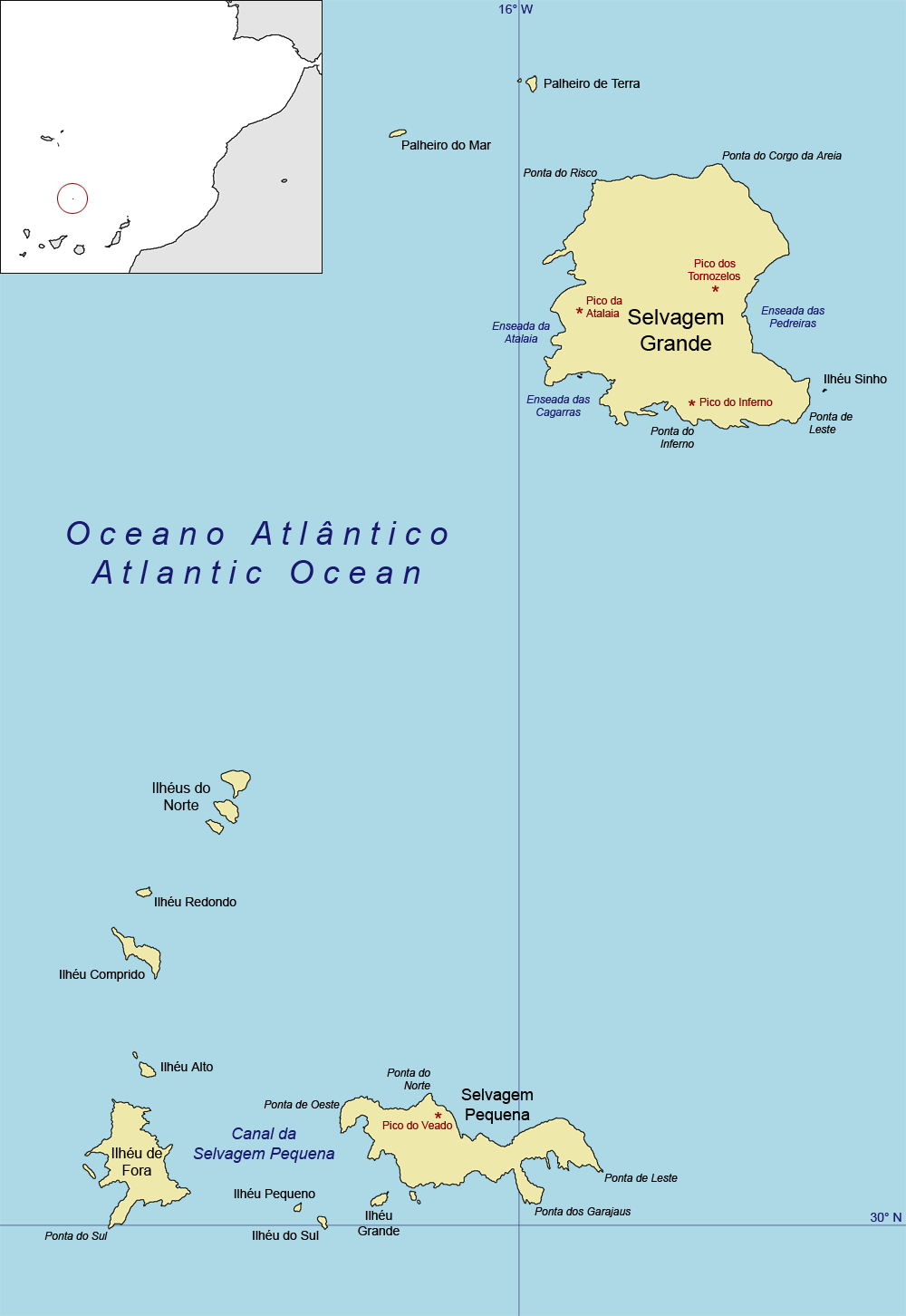
Location of the Selvagens Islands

The Lepidoptera of the Selvagens Islands consist of both the butterflies and moths recorded from the Selvagens Islands (Savage Islands), a small Portuguese archipelago in the North Atlantic.

According to a recent estimate, there are 21 Lepidoptera species in the Selvagens Islands.

== Butterflies ==
No butterflies have been recorded from the Selvagens Islands.

== Moths ==
=== Crambidae ===
- Nomophila noctuella (Denis & Schiffermuller, 1775)
- Palpita vitrealis (Rossi, 1794)

=== Noctuidae ===
- Abrostola canariensis Hampson, 1913
- Agrotis lanzarotensis Rebel, 1894
- Agrotis segetum (Denis & Schiffermuller, 1775)
- Autographa gamma (Linnaeus, 1758)
- Cardepia affinis (Rothschild, 1913)
- Euxoa canariensis Rebel, 1902
- Helicoverpa armigera (Hübner, 1808)
- Heliothis peltigera (Denis & Schiffermuller, 1775)
- Spodoptera exigua (Hübner, 1808)
- Trichoplusia ni (Hübner, 1803)

=== Pterophoridae ===
- Agdistis bifurcatus Agenjo, 1952
- Agdistis salsolae Walsingham, 1908

=== Pyralidae ===
- Ancylosis roscidella (Eversmann, 1844)

=== Sphingidae ===
- Hyles livornica (Esper, 1780)
- Macroglossum stellatarum (Linnaeus, 1758)

=== Tineidae ===
- Trichophaga bipartitella (Ragonot, 1892)
- Trichophaga robinsoni Gaedike & Karsholt, 2001

=== Tortricidae ===
- Acroclita subsequana (Herrich-Schäffer, 1851)
- Selania leplastriana (Curtis, 1831)
