= List of Lepidoptera of Midway Atoll =

Location of Midway Atoll in the Pacific Ocean

The Lepidoptera of Midway Atoll consist of both the butterflies and moths recorded from the islands of Midway Atoll. Midway Atoll is part of a chain of volcanic islands, atolls, and seamounts extending from Hawai'i up to the tip of the Aleutian Islands.

According to a recent estimate, there are a total of 36 Lepidoptera species present on the Midway Atoll.

== Butterflies ==
=== Nymphalidae ===
- Vanessa cardui (Linnaeus, 1758)

== Moths ==
=== Arctiidae ===
- Utetheisa pulchelloides Hampson, 1907

=== Cosmopterigidae ===
- Asymphorodes dimorpha (Busck, 1914)
- Undescribed Asymphorodes species
- Hyposmocoma neckerensis (Swezey, 1926)
- Hyposmocoma rubescens Walsingham, 1907
- Pyroderces rileyi (Walsingham, 1882)

=== Crambidae ===
- Hellula undalis (Fabricius, 1781)
- Herpetogramma licarsisalis (Walker, 1859)
- Spoladea recurvalis (Fabricius, 1775)

=== Geometridae ===
- Cyclophora nanaria (Walker, 1861)
- Macaria abydata Guenee, 1857

=== Gracillariidae ===
- Stoeberhinus testaceus Butler, 1881

=== Noctuidae ===
- Achaea janata (Linnaeus, 1758)
- Agrotis fasciata (Rothschild, 1894)
- Agrotis ipsilon (Hufnagel, 1767)
- Chrysodeixis eriosoma (Doubleday, 1843)
- Helicoverpa zea (Boddie, 1850)
- Hypena laceratalis Walker, 1858
- Leucania loreyimima Rungs, 1953
- Pseudaletia unipuncta (Haworth, 1809)
- Spodoptera exempta (Walker, 1856)
- Spodoptera litura (Fabricius, 1775)
- Spodoptera mauritia (Boisduval, 1833)

=== Plutellidae ===
- Plutella xylostella (Linnaeus, 1758)

=== Pterophoridae ===
- Lioptilodes parvus (Walsingham, 1880)
- Megalorhipida leucodactylus (Fabricius, 1793)

=== Pyralidae ===
- Pyralis manihotalis Guenee, 1854

=== Sphingidae ===
- Agrius cingulata (Fabricius, 1775)
- Deilephila nerii (Linnaeus, 1758)

=== Tineidae ===
- Erechthias simulans (Butler, 1882)
- Monopis meliorella (Walker, 1863)
- Opogona aurisquamosa (Butler, 1881)

=== Tortricidae ===
- Amorbia emigratella Busck, 1910
- Undescribed Bactra sp. nr. Bactra straminea (Butler, 1881)
- Crocidosema blackburni (Butler, 1881)
