= List of Lepidoptera of Nauru =

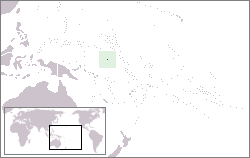
Location of Nauru

The Lepidoptera of Nauru consists of both the butterflies and moths recorded from Nauru, an island country in Micronesia in the Central Pacific.

According to a recent estimate, there are a total of four butterfly species present in Nauru, none of which is endemic. The number of moth species is unknown.

== Butterflies ==
=== Hesperiidae ===
- Badamia exclamationis (Fabricius, 1775)

=== Lycaenidae ===
- Petrelaea tombugensis (Rober, 1886)

=== Nymphalidae ===
- Danaus plexippus (Linnaeus, 1758)
- Hypolimnas bolina (Linnaeus, 1758)

== Moths ==
=== Choreutidae ===
- Choreutis orthogona (Meyrick, 1886)

=== Crambidae ===
- Diaphania indica (Sanders, 1851)
- Glyphodes multilinealis Kenrick, 1907
- Parotis suralis (Lederer, 1863)
- Spoladea recurvalis (Fabricius 1775)

=== Elachistidae ===
- Ethmia nigroapicella (Saalmüller 1880)

=== Erebidae ===
- Achaea janata (Linnaeus, 1758)
- Anticarsia irrorata (Fabricius, 1781)
- Eublemma anachoresis (Wallgreen, 1863)
- Mocis frugalis (Fabricius, 1775)
- Mocis trifasciata (Stephens 1829)

=== Gelechiidae ===
- Trissodoris honorariella (Walsingham, 1907)

=== Pterophoridae ===
- Hepalastis pumilio (Zeller 1873)
- Megalorhipida leucodactyla (Fabricius 1794)
- Sphenarches anisodactylus (Walker 1864)

=== Pyralidae ===
- Etiella zinckenella (Treitschke 1832)

=== Noctuidae ===
- ?Amyna axis (Guenée, 1852)
- Chrysodeixis eriosoma (Doubleday 1843)
- Spodoptera mauritia (Boisduval 1833)
- Stictoptera cucullioides Guenée 1852

=== Nolidae ===
- Westermannia superba (Hübner, 1823)

=== Sphingidae ===
- Gnathothlibus erotus (Cramer, 1777)

=== Tineidae ===
- Erechthias penicillata (Swezey, 1909)

=== Tortricidae ===
- Cryptophlebia ombrodelta (Lower, 1898)
