= List of Lepidoptera of Kuwait =

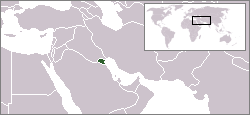
Location of Kuwait

The Lepidoptera of Kuwait consist of both the butterflies and moths recorded from Kuwait.

According to a recent estimate, there are a total of about 76 Lepidoptera species present in Kuwait.

== Butterflies ==
=== Nymphalidae ===
- Vanessa cardui (Linnaeus, 1758)

== Moths ==
=== Crambidae ===
- Amselia heringi (Amsel, 1935)
- Pediasia numidellus (Rebel, 1903)

=== Noctuidae ===
- Acontia biskrensis − Oberthür, 1887
- Caradrina clavipalpis − (Scopoli, 1763)
