= List of Lepidoptera of Wallis and Futuna =

Location of Wallis and Futuna

This is a list of the butterflies and moths of Wallis and Futuna, a French overseas collectivity in the South Pacific.

== Butterflies ==
=== Lycaenidae ===
==== Polyommatinae ====
- Euchrysops cnejus samoa (Herrich-Schaeffer, 1869)
- Euploea boisduvalii boisduvalii Lucas, 1853
- Euploea lewinii eschscholtzii (C & R Felder, 1865)

=== Nymphalidae ===
==== Nymphalinae ====
- Danaus plexippus (Linnaeus, 1758)
- Hypolimnas bolina (Linnaeus, 1758)
- Junonia villida villida (Fabricius, 1787)

== Moths ==
=== Agonoxenidae ===
- Agonoxena argaula Meyrick, 1921

=== Crambidae ===
- Lamprosema octasema Meyrick, 1886
- Nacoleia octasema (Meyrick, 1886)
- Spoladea recurvalis (Fabricius, 1775)

=== Erebidae ===
- Achaea janata (Linnaeus, 1758)

=== Gelechiidae ===
- Scrobipalpa heliopa Lower, 1900

=== Noctuidae ===
- Eudocima phalonia (Linnaeus, 1763)
- Helicoverpa armigera (Hübner, [1809])
- Spodoptera litura (Fabricius, 1775)

=== Tortricidae ===
- Cryptophlebia pallifimbriana Bradley, 1953

=== Sphingidae ===
- Hippotion celerio (Linnaeus, 1758)

=== References ===
- W.John Tennent: A checklist of the butterflies of Melanesia, Micronesia, Polynesia and some adjacent areas. Zootaxa 1178: 1-209 (21 April 2006)
- Gutierrez, 1981. Actualisation des Données sur l'Entomologie Economique à Wallis et a Futuna. ORSTOM.
