= List of moths of Burkina Faso =

Location of Burkina Faso

Moths of Burkina Faso represent about 68 known moth species. The moths (mostly nocturnal) and butterflies (mostly diurnal) together make up the taxonomic order Lepidoptera.

This is a list of moth species which have been recorded in Burkina Faso.

== Arctiidae ==
- Amerila niveivitrea (Bartel, 1903)
- Creatonotos leucanioides Holland, 1893
- Cyana klausruedigerbecki Karisch, 2005

== Lasiocampidae ==
- Euphorea ondulosa (Conte, 1909)
- Morongea elfiora Zolotuhin & Prozorov, 2010
- Odontocheilopteryx haribda Gurkovich & Zolotuhin, 2009
- Odontocheilopteryx maculata Aurivillius, 1905
- Odontocheilopteryx pattersoni Tams, 1926
- Opisthodontia afroio Zolotuhin & Prozorov, 2010
- Opisthodontia sidha Zolotuhin & Prozorov, 2010
- Stenophatna hollandi (Tams, 1929)
- Theophasida cardinalli (Tams, 1926)

== Lymantriidae ==
- Otroeda hesperia (Cramer, 1779)

== Metarbelidae ==
- Moyencharia herhausi Lehmann, 2013
- Moyencharia ochreicosta (Gaede, 1929)

== Noctuidae ==
- Abrostola confusa Dufay, 1958
- Achaea mercatoria (Fabricius, 1775)
- Acontia esperiana Hacker, Legrain & Fibiger, 2010
- Acontia insocia (Walker, 1857)
- Acontia nigrimacula Hacker, Legrain & Fibiger, 2008
- Acontia wahlbergi Wallengren, 1856
- Argyrogramma signata (Fabricius, 1775)
- Aspidifrontia hemileuca (Hampson, 1909)
- Aspidifrontia villiersi (Laporte, 1972)
- Attatha metaleuca Hampson, 1913
- Audea paulumnodosa Kühne, 2005
- Brevipecten confluens Hampson, 1926
- Brevipecten politzari Hacker & Fibiger, 2007
- Cerocala albicornis Berio, 1966
- Cerocala caelata Karsch, 1896
- Chasmina vestae (Guenée, 1852)
- Chrysodeixis acuta (Walker, [1858])
- Chrysodeixis chalcites (Esper, 1789)
- Crypsotidia maculifera (Staudinger, 1898)
- Crypsotidia mesosema Hampson, 1913
- Diparopsis watersi (Rothschild, 1901)
- Eublemma ragusana (Freyer, 1844)
- Eublemma tytrocoides Hacker & Hausmann, 2010
- Eutelia polychorda Hampson, 1902
- Grammodes congenita Walker, 1858
- Hypotacha ochribasalis (Hampson, 1896)
- Marathyssa cuneata (Saalmüller, 1891)
- Masalia nubila (Hampson, 1903)
- Parachalciope benitensis (Holland, 1894)
- Polytela cliens (Felder & Rogenhofer, 1874)
- Polytelodes florifera (Walker, 1858)
- Rhabdophera arefacta (Swinhoe, 1884)
- Rhabdophera clathrum (Guenée, 1852)
- Rhabdophera hansali (Felder & Rogenhofer, 1874)
- Saalmuellerana media (Walker, 1857)
- Tachosa fumata (Wallengren, 1860)
- Thiacidas meii Hacker & Zilli, 2007
- Thiacidas mukim (Berio, 1977)
- Thiacidas politzari Hacker & Zilli, 2010
- Thiacidas stassarti Hacker & Zilli, 2007
- Ulotrichopus tinctipennis (Hampson, 1902)

== Nolidae ==
- Xanthodes brunnescens (Pinhey, 1968)

== Pyralidae ==
- Lepipaschia limbata Shaffer & Solis, 1994

== Saturniidae ==
- Gynanisa jama Rebel, 1915
- Holocerina angulata (Aurivillius, 1893)
- Holocerina istsariensis Stoneham, 1962
- Micragone rougeriei Bouyer, 2008
- Usta terpsichore (Maassen & Weymer, 1885)

== Sphingidae ==
- Ceridia heuglini (C. & R. Felder, 1874)
