= List of moths of Benin =

Location of Benin

Benin moths represent about 25 known moth species. The moths (mostly nocturnal) and butterflies (mostly diurnal) together make up the taxonomic order Lepidoptera.

This is a list of moth species which have been recorded in Benin.

== Anomoeotidae ==
- Anomoeotes infuscata Talbot, 1929

== Alucitidae ==
- Alucita chloracta (Meyrick, 1908)

== Arctiidae ==
- Amerila brunnea (Hampson, 1901)
- Amerila luteibarba (Hampson, 1901)
- Amerila niveivitrea (Bartel, 1903)

== Cossidae ==
- Phragmataecia psyche (Le Cerf, 1919)

== Crambidae ==
- Pleuroptya balteata (Fabricius, 1798)

== Geometridae ==
- Zamarada vulpina Warren, 1897

== Gracillariidae ==
- Acrocercops hedymopa Turner, 1913

== Noctuidae ==
- Aegocera rectilinea Boisduval, 1836
- Crameria amabilis (Drury, 1773)
- Metagarista maenas (Herrich-Schäffer, 1853)
- Sarothroceras banaka (Plötz, 1880)

== Notodontidae ==
- Epicerura tamsi Kiriakoff, 1963
- Pseudoscrancia africana (Holland, 1893)

== Saturniidae ==
- Aurivillius horsini Bouvier, 1927
- Imbrasia obscura (Butler, 1878)
- Nudaurelia eblis Strecker, 1876
- Nudaurelia emini (Butler, 1888)

== Sesiidae ==
- Tipulamima sexualis (Hampson, 1910)
- Trichocerata bicolor (Le Cerf, 1917)

== Tineidae ==
- Cimitra fetialis (Meyrick, 1917)
- Syncalipsis typhodes (Meyrick, 1917)
- Tiquadra cultrifera Meyrick, 1914

== Tortricidae ==
- Rubrograptis recrudescentia Razowski, 1981
- Thaumatotibia leucotreta (Meyrick, 1913)
