= List of butterflies of Wake Island and Johnston Atoll =

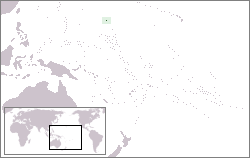
Location of Wake Island

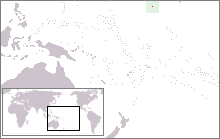
Location of the Johnston Atoll

This is a list of butterflies of Wake Island and the Johnston Atoll.

== Nymphalidae ==
=== Nymphalinae ===
- Hypolimnas bolina rarik von Eschscholtz, 1821
