= List of moths of the French Southern and Antarctic Lands =

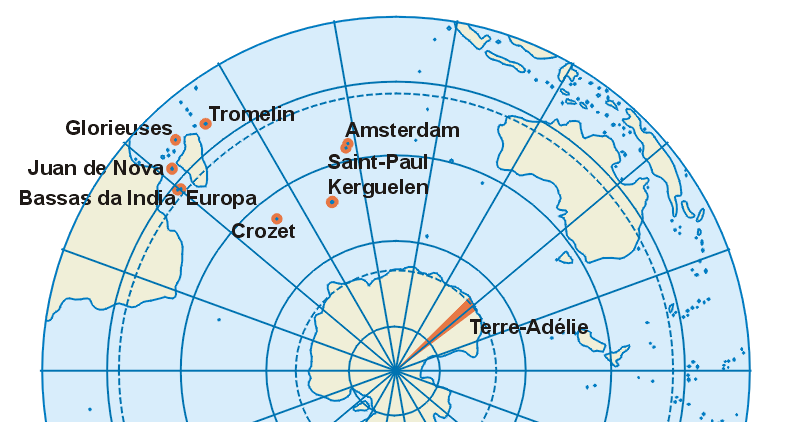
Location of the French Southern and Antarctic Lands

Moths of the French Southern and Antarctic Lands represent about 10 known moth species. The moths (mostly nocturnal) and butterflies (mostly diurnal) together make up the taxonomic order Lepidoptera.

This is a list of moth species which have been recorded from the French Southern and Antarctic Lands.

== Crambidae ==
- Crambus viettellus Błeszyński & Collins, 1962
- Nomophila incognita Viette, 1959

== Noctuidae ==
- Agrotis ipsilon (Hufnagel, 1766)
- Brachypteragrotis patricei Viette, 1959
- Heliothis pauliani Viette, 1959

== Tineidae ==
- Monopis crocicapitella (Clemens, 1859)
- Opogona omoscopa (Meyrick, 1893)
- Pringleophaga crozetensis Enderlein, 1905
- Pringleophaga kerguelensis Enderlein, 1905

== Yponomeutidae ==
- Embryonopsis halticella Eaton, 1875
