= List of moths of Egypt =

The following is an incomplete list of the moths of Egypt.

== Erebinae ==
- Achaea lienardi (Boisduval, 1933)
- Cerocala illustrata (Holland, 1897)
- Clytie sancta (Staudinger, 1900)

== Crambidae ==
=== Acentropinae ===
- Parapoynx diminutalis (Snellen, 1880)

=== Odontiinae ===
- Aporodes floralis (Hubner, 1809)
