= List of butterflies of the Marshall Islands =

Location of the Marshall Islands

This is a list of butterflies of the Marshall Islands.

== Hesperiidae ==
=== Coeliadinae ===
- Badamia exclamationis (Fabricius, 1775)

== Lycaenidae ==
=== Polyommatinae ===
- Lampides boeticus (Linnaeus, 1767)

== Nymphalidae ==
=== Danainae ===
- Danaus plexippus plexippus (Linnaeus, 1758)

=== Nymphalinae ===
- Hypolimnas bolina rarik von Eschscholtz, 1821
- Junonia villida villida (Fabricius, 1787)
