= List of butterflies of Kiribati =

Location of Kiribati

This is a list of butterflies of Kiribati. This list includes species found on the US islands Baker Island, Howland Island, Jarvis Island and Kingman Reef.

== Nymphalidae ==
=== Danainae ===
- Danaus plexippus plexippus (Linnaeus, 1758)

=== Nymphalinae ===
- Hypolimnas bolina rarik von Eschscholtz, 1821
- Junonia villida villida (Fabricius, 1787)
