= List of butterflies of Eritrea =

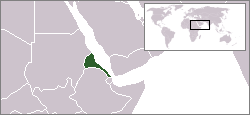
Location of Eritrea

This is a list of butterflies of Eritrea. About 13 species are known from Eritrea, one of which is endemic Charaxes figini.

== Papilionidae ==
=== Papilioninae ===
==== Papilionini ====
- Papilio nireus pseudonireus Felder & Felder, 1865
- Papilio dardanus figinii Storace, 1962

== Pieridae ==
=== Coliadinae ===
- Eurema brigitta (Stoll, [1780])
- Eurema hecabe solifera (Butler, 1875)
- Colias electo meneliki Berger, 1940
- Colias marnoana Rogenhofer, 1884

=== Pierinae ===
- Colotis danae eupompe (Klug, 1829)

==== Pierini ====
- Belenois aurota (Fabricius, 1793)
- Belenois creona boguensis (Felder & Felder, 1865)

== Lycaenidae ==
=== Miletinae ===
==== Miletini ====
- Lachnocnema abyssinica Libert, 1996

== Nymphalidae ==
=== Danainae ===
==== Danaini ====
- Amauris echeria abessinica Schmidt, 1921
- Amauris ochleides Staudinger, 1896

=== Satyrinae ===
==== Satyrini ====
- Ypthima condamini Kielland, 1982

== See also ==
- Geography of Eritrea
