= List of moths of Guinea-Bissau =

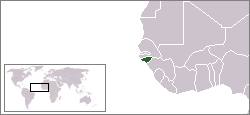
Location of Guinea-Bissau

Moths of Guinea-Bissau represent only 2 known moth species. The moths (mostly nocturnal) and butterflies (mostly diurnal) together make up the taxonomic order Lepidoptera.

This is a list of moth species which have been recorded in Guinea-Bissau.

== Saturniidae ==
- Imbrasia epimethea (Drury, 1772)

== Sphingidae ==
- Acanthosphinx guessfeldti (Dewitz, 1879)
