= List of butterflies of Réunion =

Location of Réunion

This is a list of butterflies of Réunion. About 28 species are known from Réunion, three of which are endemic.

== Papilionidae ==
=== Papilioninae ===
==== Papilionini ====
- Papilio demodocus Esper, [1798]
- Papilio phorbanta Linnaeus, 1771 (endemic)

== Pieridae ==
=== Coliadinae ===
- Eurema floricola ceres (Butler, 1886)
- Eurema brigitta pulchella (Boisduval, 1833)
- Catopsilia florella (Fabricius, 1775)
- Catopsilia thauruma (Reakirt, 1866)

== Lycaenidae ==
=== Miletinae ===
- Spalgis tintinga (Boisduval, 1833)

=== Theclinae ===
==== Theclini ====
- Deudorix antalus (Hopffer, 1855)

=== Polyommatinae ===
==== Polyommatini ====
- Luthrodes pandava (Horsfield, 1829)
- Cacyreus darius (Mabille, 1877)
- Cacyreus marshalli Butler, 1897
- Lampides boeticus (Linnaeus, 1767)
- Leptomyrina phidias (Fabricius, 1793)
- Leptotes pirithous (Linnaeus, 1767)
- Zizeeria knysna (Trimen, 1862)
- Zizina antanossa (Mabille, 1877)
- Zizula hylax (Fabricius, 1775)

== Nymphalidae ==
=== Danainae ===
==== Danaini ====
- Danaus plexippus (Linnaeus, 1758)
- Danaus chrysippus orientis (Aurivillius, 1909)
- Euploea goudotii Boisduval, 1833 (endemic)

=== Satyrinae ===
==== Melanitini ====
- Melanitis leda (Linnaeus, 1758)

==== Satyrini ====
- Heteropsis narcissus narcissus (Fabricius, 1798)
- Heteropsis narcissus borbonica (Oberthür, 1916)

=== Nymphalinae ===
==== Nymphalini ====
- Antanartia borbonica (Oberthür, 1879)
- Vanessa cardui (Linnaeus, 1758)
- Junonia rhadama (Boisduval, 1833)
- Salamis augustina Boisduval, 1833
- Hypolimnas misippus (Linnaeus, 1764)

=== Limenitinae ===
==== Neptidini ====
- Neptis dumetorum Boisduval, 1833 (endemic)

=== Heliconiinae ===
==== Vagrantini ====
- Phalanta phalantha aethiopica (Rothschild & Jordan, 1903)

== Hesperiidae ==
=== Coeliadinae ===
- Coeliades ernesti (Grandidier, 1867)
- Coeliades forestan (Stoll, [1782])

=== Pyrginae ===
==== Tagiadini ====
- Eagris sabadius (Gray, 1832)

=== Hesperiinae ===
==== Baorini ====
- Borbo borbonica (Boisduval, 1833)
- Parnara naso bigutta Evans, 1937

== See also ==
- List of moths of Réunion
- Wildlife of Réunion
