= List of Lepidoptera of Palmyra Atoll =

Palmyra Atoll

The Lepidoptera of Palmyra Atoll consist of both the butterflies and moths recorded from Palmyra Atoll in the Pacific Ocean. The atoll consists of an extensive reef, two shallow lagoons, and some 50 sand and reef-rock islets and bars covered with vegetation—mostly coconut trees, Scaevola, and tall Pisonia trees.

According to a recent estimate, there are 11 Lepidoptera species on Palmyra Atoll.

== Butterflies ==
=== Nymphalidae ===
- Hypolimnas bolina Linnaeus, 1758

== Moths ==
=== Agonoxenidae ===
- Agonoxena argaula Meyrick, 1921

=== Cosmopterigidae ===
- Anatrachyntis incertulella (Walker, 1864)

=== Crambidae ===
- Piletocera signiferalis (Wallengren, 1860)

=== Gelechiidae ===
- Stoeberbinus testaceus Butler, 1881

=== Gracillariidae ===
- 1 undescribed species

=== Noctuidae ===
- Chrysodeixis eriosoma (Doubleday, 1843)
- Spodoptera litura (Fabricius, 1775)

=== Sphingidae ===
- Agrius cingulata (Fabricius, 1775)

=== Tineidae ===
- Erechtias simulans (Butler, 1882)
- 1 undescribed Opogona species
