= Gymnoscelis concinna =

Scientific classification
- Domain: Eukaryota
- Kingdom: Animalia
- Phylum: Arthropoda
- Class: Insecta
- Order: Lepidoptera
- Family: Geometridae
- Genus: Gymnoscelis
- Species: G. concinna

Binomial name
- Gymnoscelis concinna C. Swinhoe, 1902

Species of moth

Gymnoscelis concinna is a moth in the family Geometridae first described by Charles Swinhoe in 1902. It is found on various Pacific islands, including Tonga, Fiji and the Cook Islands, the Austral Islands, Easter Island, Henderson Island, Pitcairn Island and the Society Islands.

== Subspecies ==
- Gymnoscelis concinna concinna (Tonga)
- Gymnoscelis concinna nephelota Prout, 1958 (Fiji)
- Gymnoscelis concinna solmafua Robinson, 1975 (Rotuma Island)
