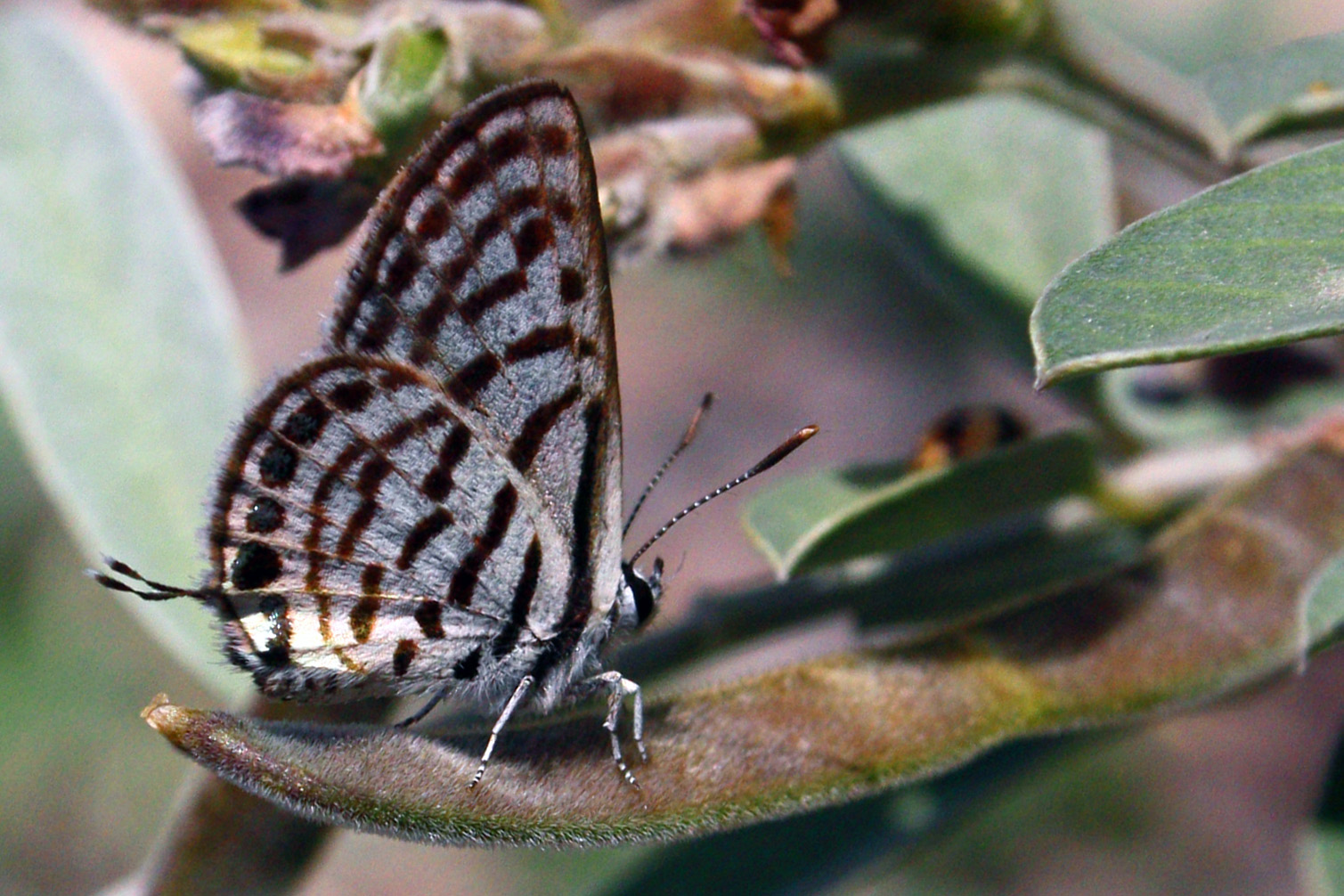
- In Zighy Bay, Musandam Peninsula, Oman

Conservation status
- Least Concern (IUCN 3.1)

Scientific classification
- Kingdom: Animalia
- Phylum: Arthropoda
- Class: Insecta
- Order: Lepidoptera
- Family: Lycaenidae
- Genus: Tarucus
- Species: T. rosacea

Binomial name
- Tarucus rosacea (Austaut, 1885)

Synonyms
- Lycaena theophrastus var. rosacea Austaut, 1885; Tarucus mediterraneae Bethune-Baker, 1918

= Tarucus rosacea =

Species of butterfly

Tarucus rosacea, the Mediterranean Pierrot or Mediterranean tiger blue, is a butterfly in the family Lycaenidae. It is found in Mauritania, Senegal, the Gambia, Guinea, Burkina Faso, northern Ivory Coast, northern Ghana, northern Nigeria, Niger, northern Cameroon, Chad, Sudan, Ethiopia, northern Uganda, north-western Kenya, Somalia, Djibouti and Arabia. The habitat consists of Sudan savanna and the Sahel.

Adults feed from the flowers of Ziziphus species.

The larvae feed on Ziziphus jujuba. They are associated with ants of the Plagiolepis, Camponotus and Monomorium genera.
