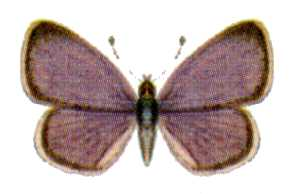
- Famegana alsulus alsulus

Scientific classification
- Domain: Eukaryota
- Kingdom: Animalia
- Phylum: Arthropoda
- Class: Insecta
- Order: Lepidoptera
- Family: Lycaenidae
- Subfamily: Polyommatinae
- Tribe: Polyommatini
- Genus: Famegana; Eliot, 1973
- Species: F. alsulus

Binomial name
- Famegana alsulus (Herrich-Schäffer, 1869)

= Famegana =

Monotypic butterfly genus in family Lycaenidae

Famegana is a monotypic butterfly genus in the family Lycaenidae erected by John Nevill Eliot in 1973. Its single species, Famegana alsulus, the black-spotted grass blue, was first described by Gottlieb August Wilhelm Herrich-Schäffer in 1869. It is found in the Australasian realm.

== Subspecies ==
- F. a. alsulus Torres Strait Island, North Australia - New South Wales
- F. a. lulu (Mathew, 1889) Fiji
- F. a. kalawarus (Ribbe, 1926) Sulawesi
- F. a. eggletoni (Corbet, 1941) Hong Kong
