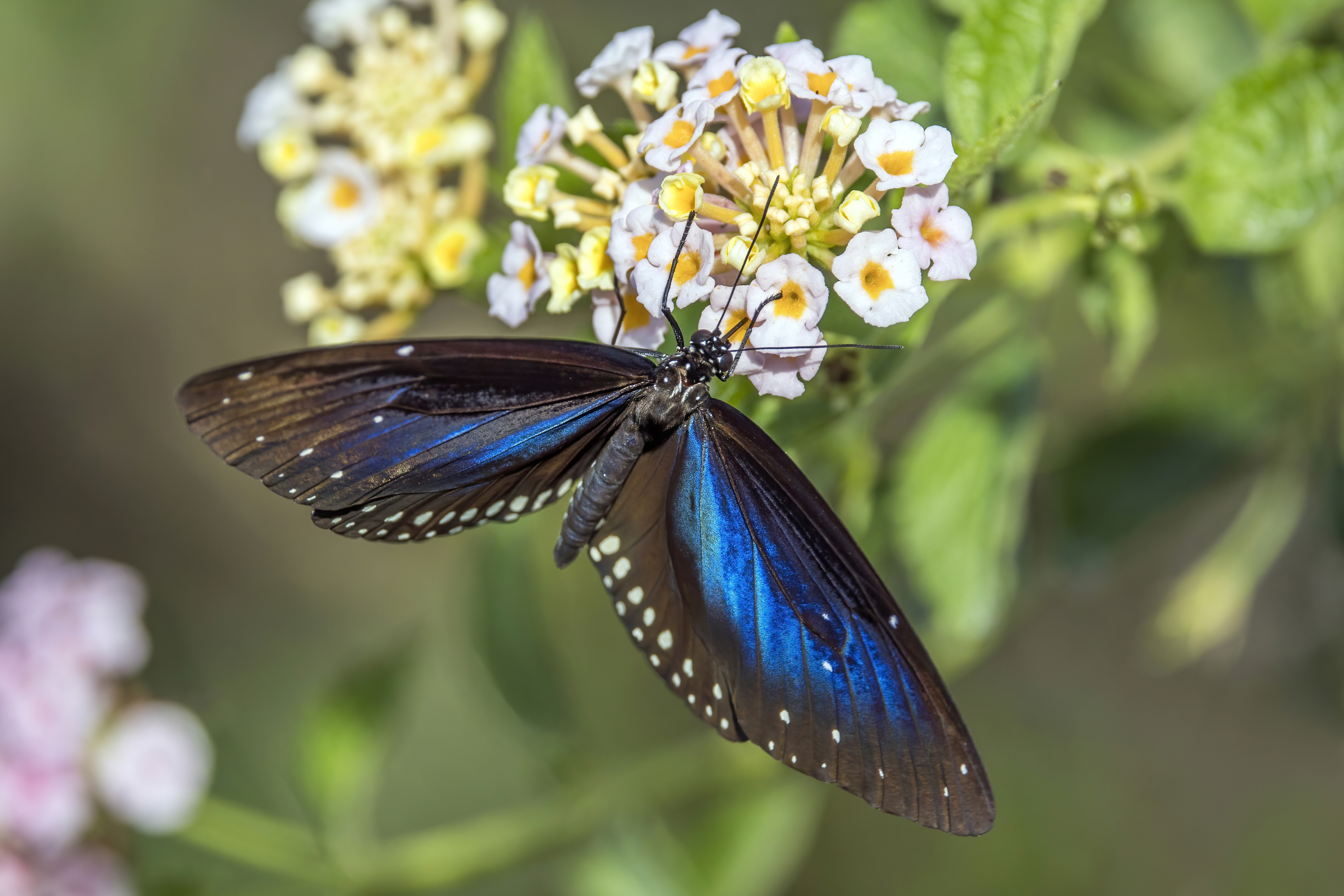

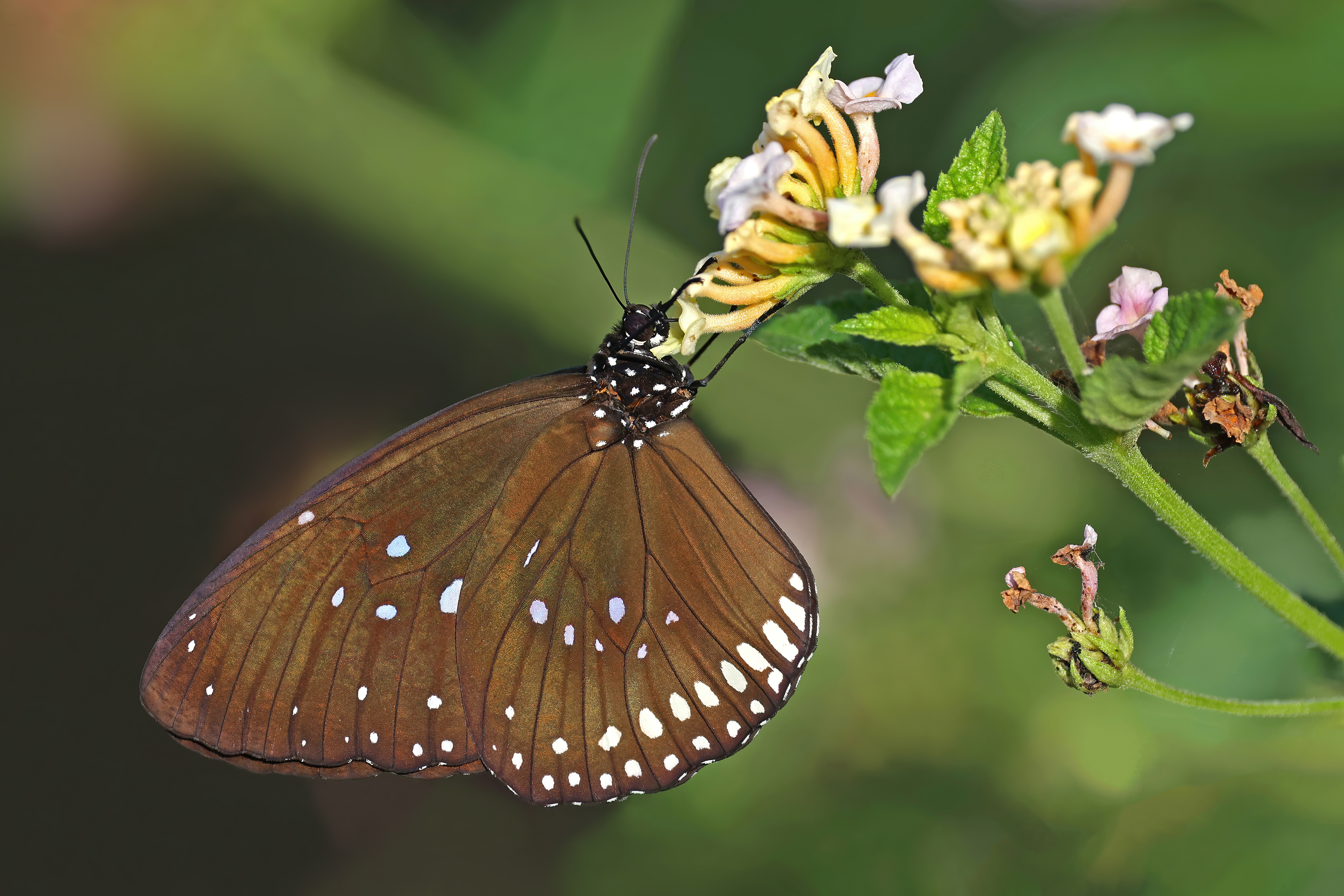
- E. a. menetriesii both Phi Phi, Thailand

Scientific classification
- Kingdom: Animalia
- Phylum: Arthropoda
- Clade: Pancrustacea
- Class: Insecta
- Order: Lepidoptera
- Family: Nymphalidae
- Genus: Euploea
- Species: E. algea

Binomial name
- Euploea algea (Godart, 1819)

= Euploea algea =

Long branded blue crow

Species of butterfly

Euploea algea, the long branded blue crow, is a butterfly found in India and Southeast Asia that belongs to the crows and tigers, that is, the Danaid group of the brush-footed butterflies family.

This is a large light brown butterfly with a wingspan of 60 to 70 mm depending on the subspecies, presents an upperside with forewings (dependent on the subspecies) with small metallic blue to completely metallic blue spots.The reverse is light brown dotted with small white dots in different numbers depending on the subspecies. The larva is brown with white and black stripes on the dorsum.

== See also ==
- Danainae
- Nymphalidae
- List of butterflies of India
- List of butterflies of India (Nymphalidae)
