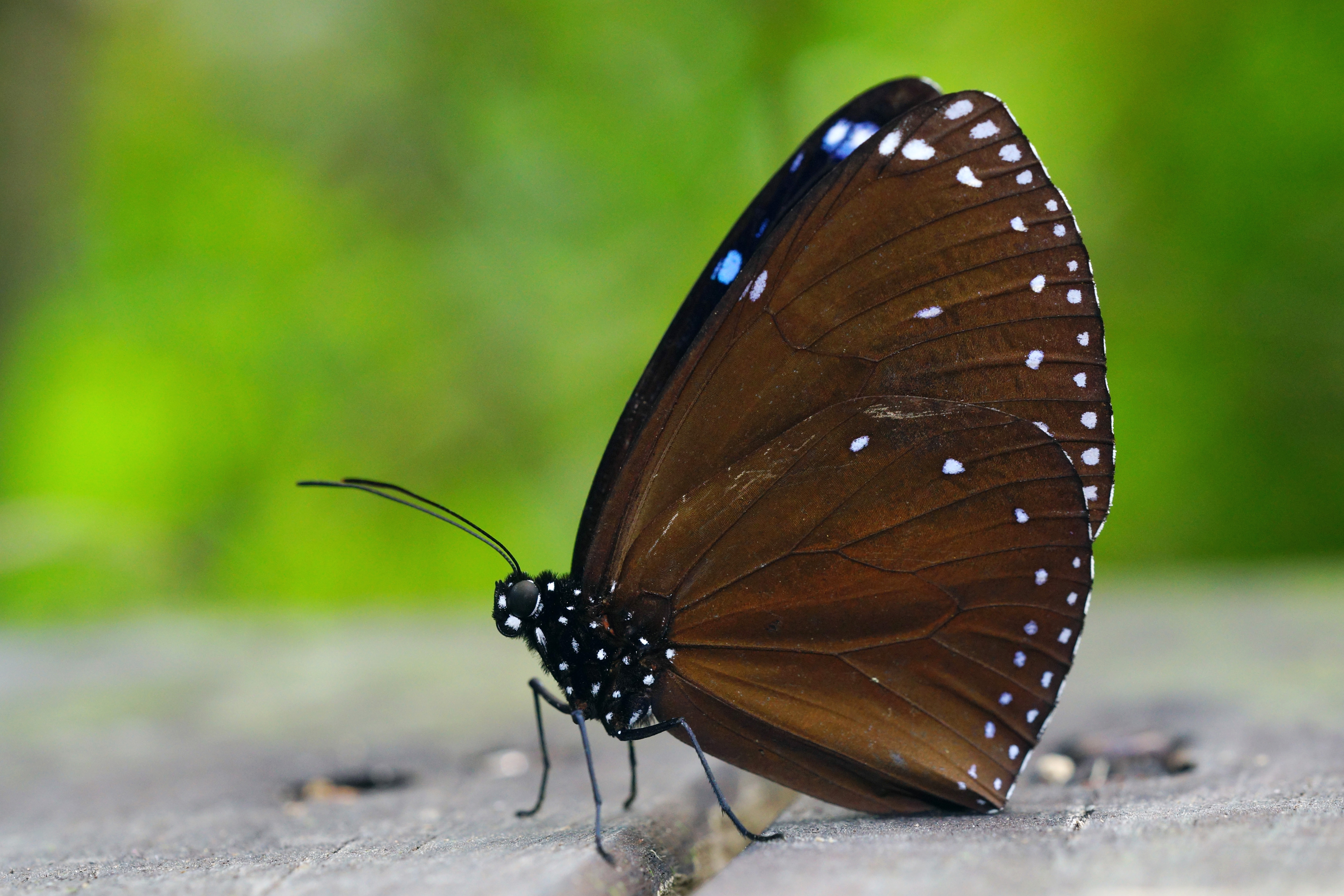
- Euploea eunice hobsoni

Scientific classification
- Kingdom: Animalia
- Phylum: Arthropoda
- Clade: Pancrustacea
- Class: Insecta
- Order: Lepidoptera
- Family: Nymphalidae
- Genus: Euploea
- Species: E. eunice

Binomial name
- Euploea eunice (Godart, 1819)

= Euploea eunice =

Blue-banded king crow

Species of butterfly

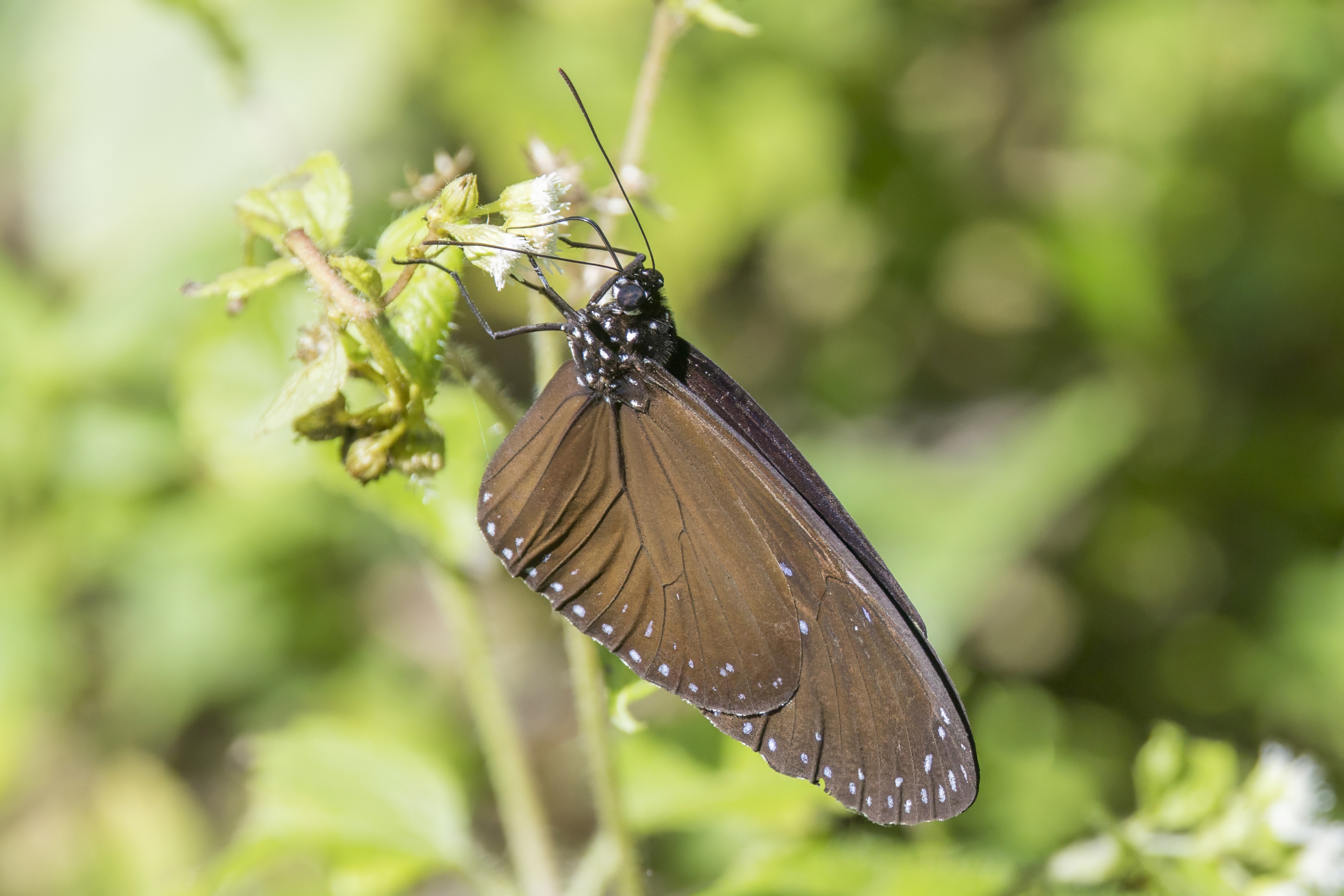
Unidentified suspecies from Bohol, Philippines

Euploea eunice, commonly called the blue-banded king crow, is a species of butterfly that belongs to the Danaid group (the crows and tigers) of the brush-footed butterflies family. It is found in the Indomalayan realm.

The larva feeds on Ficus, Flacourtia rukam, and Streblus asper.

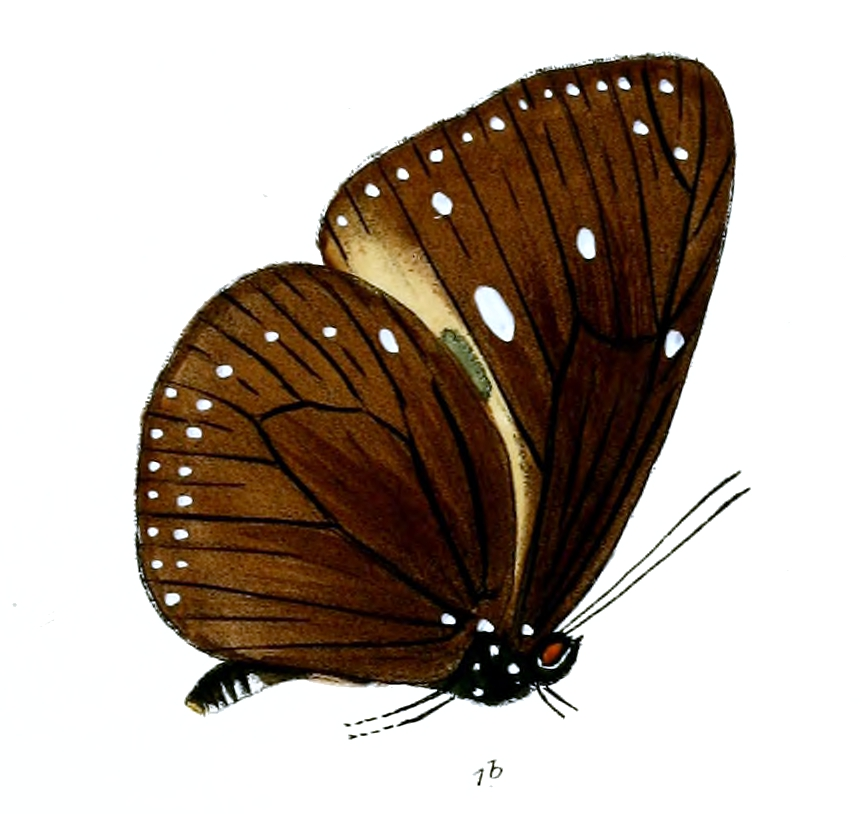

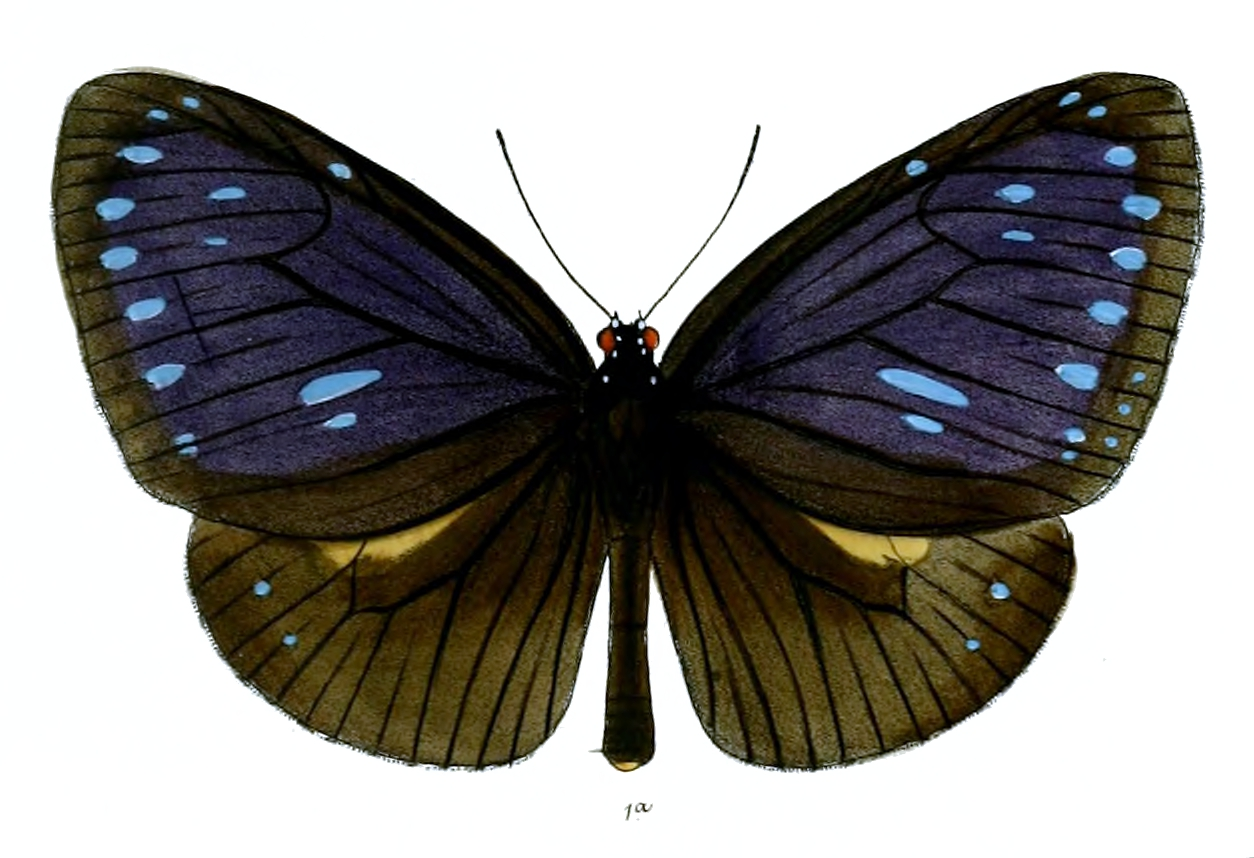

== Subspecies ==
- E. e. eunice Philippines, Guam, Japan, Malacca, Java, Sumatra, Formosa
- E. e. novarae (Felder, 1862)Nicobars, Andamans
- E. e. vestigiata Butler, 1866 Java, Sumatra
- E. e. hobsoni (Butler, 1877) Taiwan
- E. e. leucogonis (Butler, 1879) Thailand, Peninsular Malaya, Langkawi, Singapore
- E. e. meizon (Doherty, 1891) Sumba
- E. e. phane (Doherty, 1891) Enggano
- E. e. juno (Stichel, 1899) Nias
- E. e. coelestis (Fruhstorfer, 1902) Laos, North Vietnam, Haina, Southeast China
- E. e. syra (Fruhstorfer, 1902) Borneo, Palawan
- E. e. tisais (Fruhstorfer, 1902) Lombok
- E. e. kandaon Fruhstorfer, 1910 Sumbawa
- E. e. relucida Fruhstorfer, 1910 Bali
- E. e. timaius Fruhstorfer, 1910 Bawean

== See also ==
- Danainae
- Nymphalidae
- List of butterflies of India
- List of butterflies of India (Nymphalidae)
