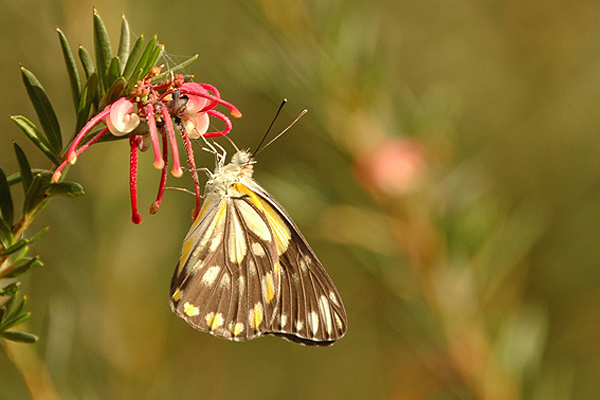

Scientific classification
- Kingdom: Animalia
- Phylum: Arthropoda
- Class: Insecta
- Order: Lepidoptera
- Family: Pieridae
- Genus: Belenois
- Species: B. java

Binomial name
- Belenois java (Sparrman, 1768)

Subspecies
- B. j. java (Indonesia); B. j. savuana (Savu); B. j. teutonia (Australia); B. j. ina (Indonesia); B. j. peristhene (Melanesia); B. j. picata (Melanesia); B. j. micronesia (Fiji)

Synonyms
- Papilio java Linnaeus, 1768; Papilio coronea Cramer, [1775]; Papilio clytie Donovan, 1805; Papilio deiopea Donovan, 1805; Pieris niseia MacLeay, [1826]; Belenois java ab. magniplaga Fruhstorfer, 1898; Anaphaeis nigrita Joicey & Talbot, 1928; Papilio teutonia Fabricius, 1775; Belenois teutonia anita Fruhstorfer, 1903; Pieris peristhene Boisduval, 1859; Belenois picata Butler, 1882; Pieris peristhene vitiensis Fruhstorfer, 1902

= Belenois java =

Caper white

Species of butterfly

Belenois java, the caper white or common white, is a small butterfly of the family Pieridae found in Australia, Indonesia, and Melanesia. It is highly migratory and is often confused with the cabbage white (Pieris rapae).

== Identification ==
=== Adult ===
The upper surface of the male's wings are white with a broad black apical patch, the hindwing has a black terminal border. On both wings the black area encloses white dots. The under surface of the hindwing is almost exclusively black except for white and yellow patches between the veins. The wingspan on the male is 5 cm whereas the female's wingspan is larger at 6 cm. The female can vary dramatically including a pale form which looks strikingly similar to the male. The upper surface of the wings is white and have a much broader black margin. The body of both is olive green to dark brown.

Both sexes and both sides

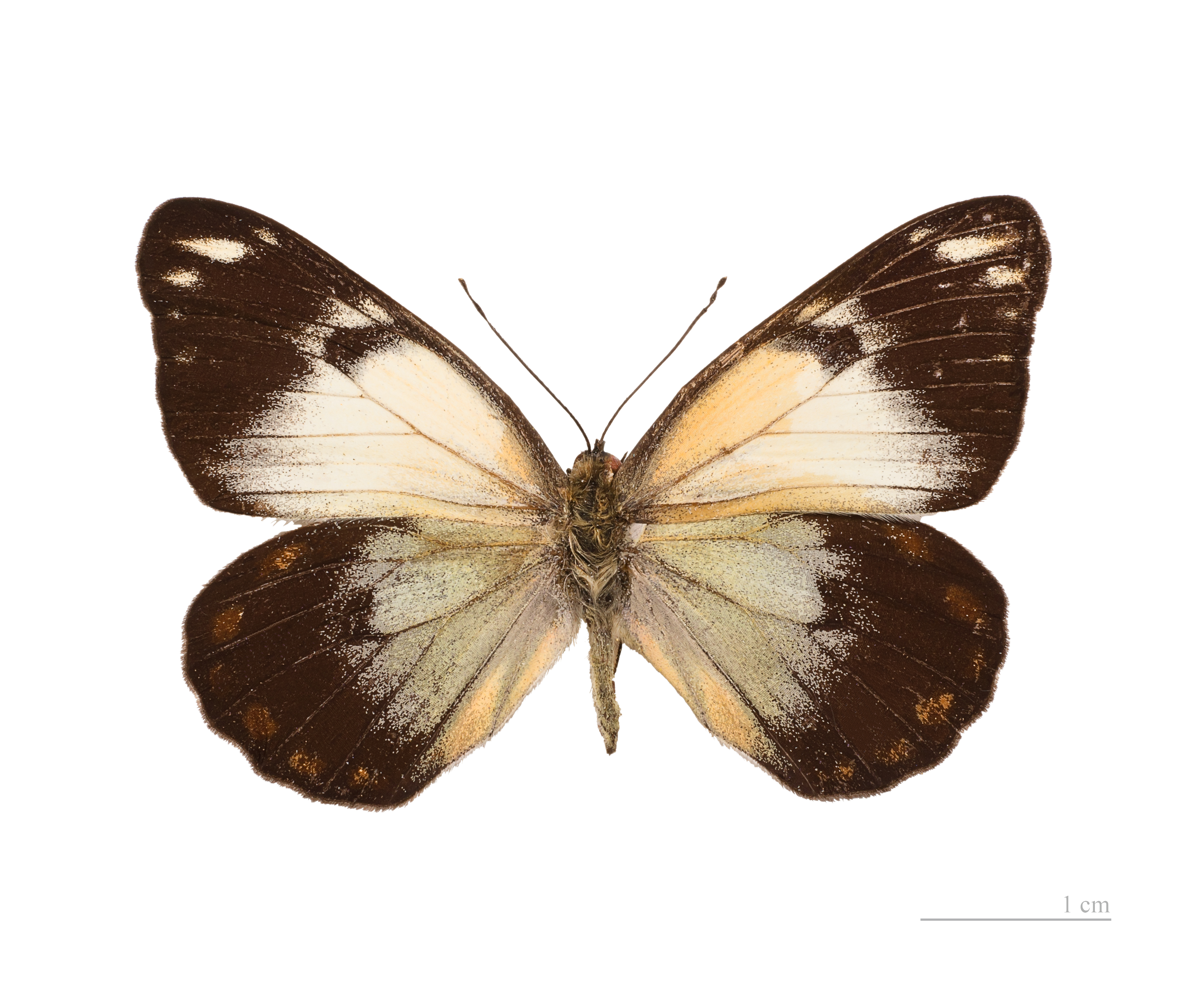
Male - dorsal side

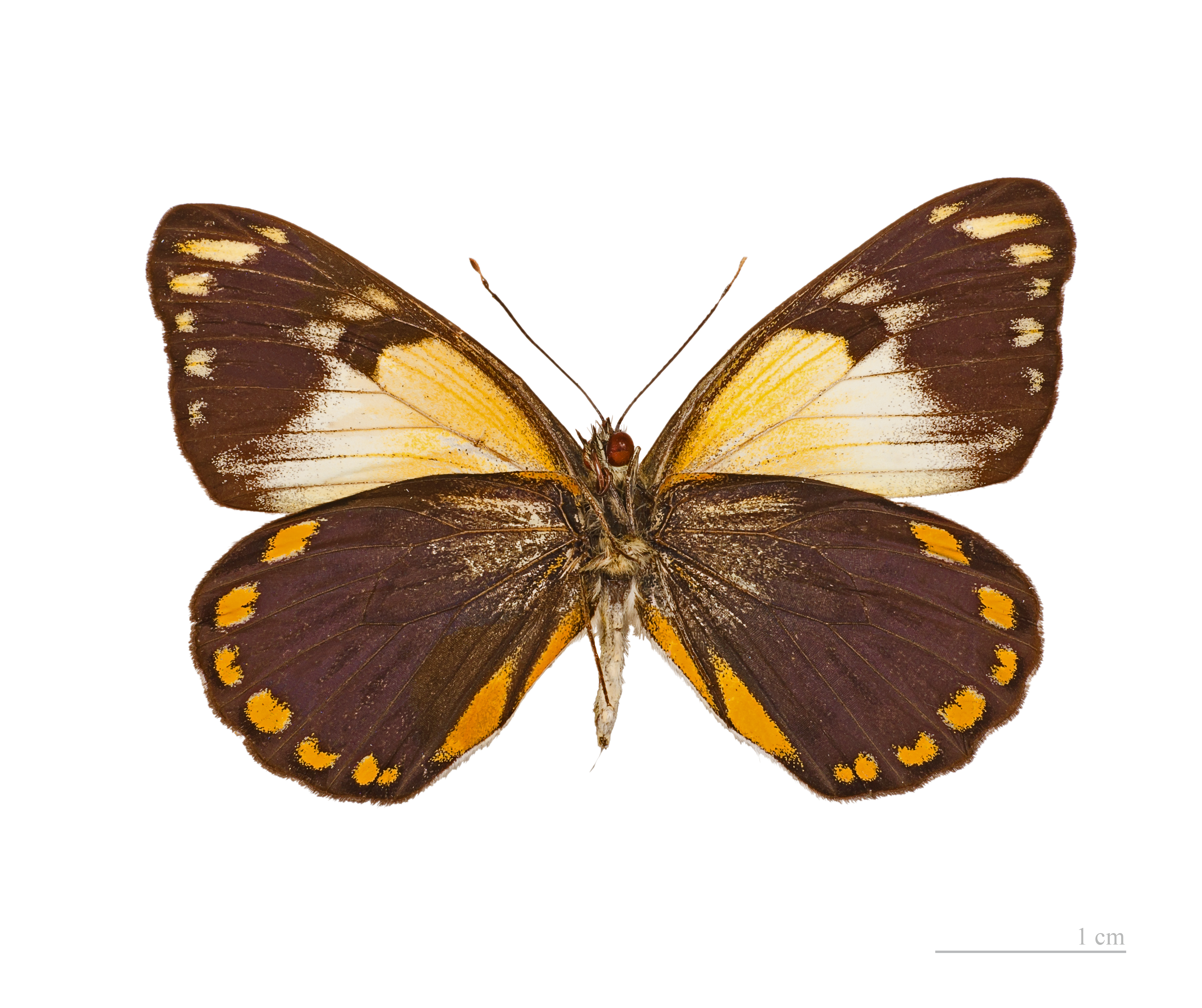
Male - ventral side

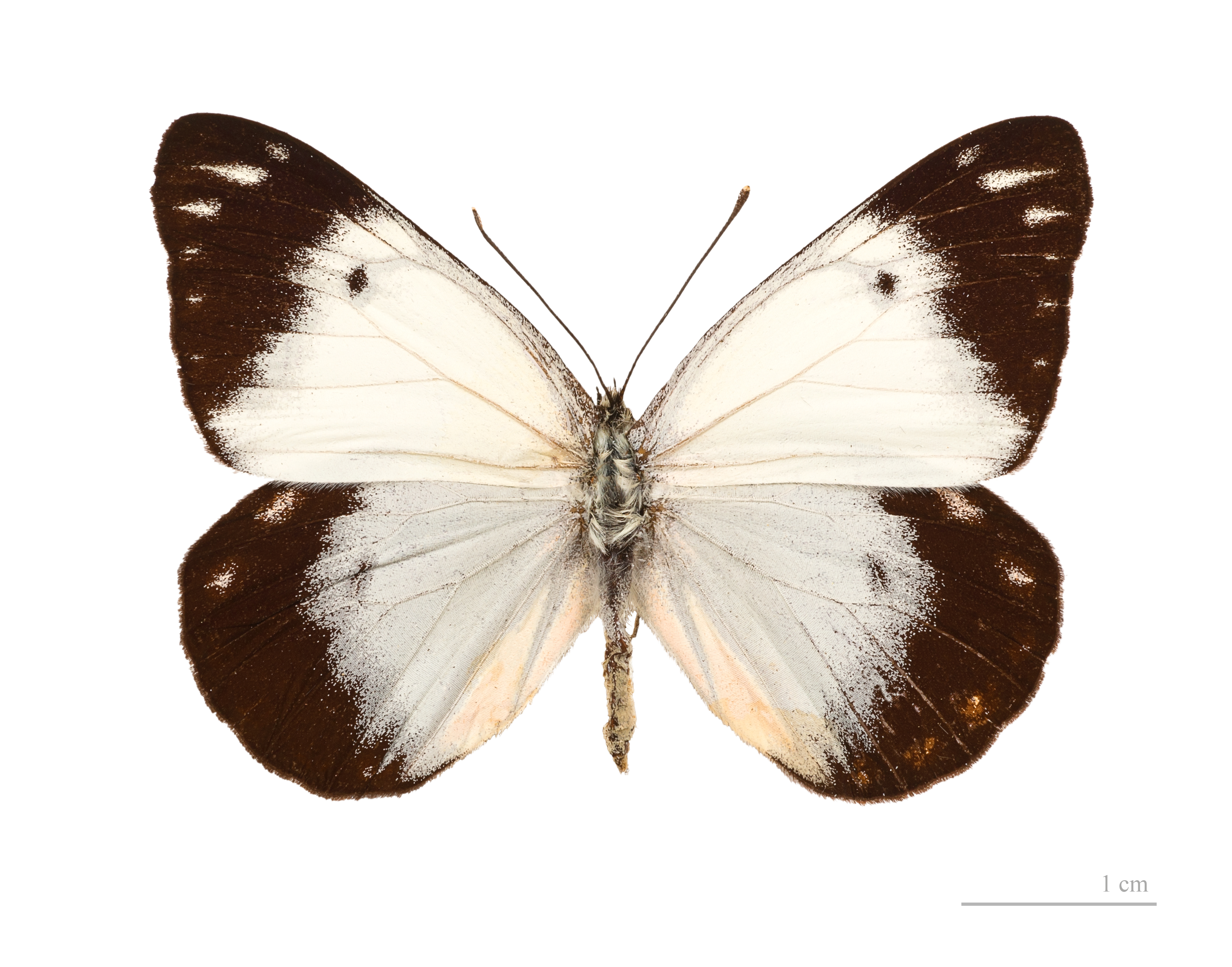
Female - dorsal side

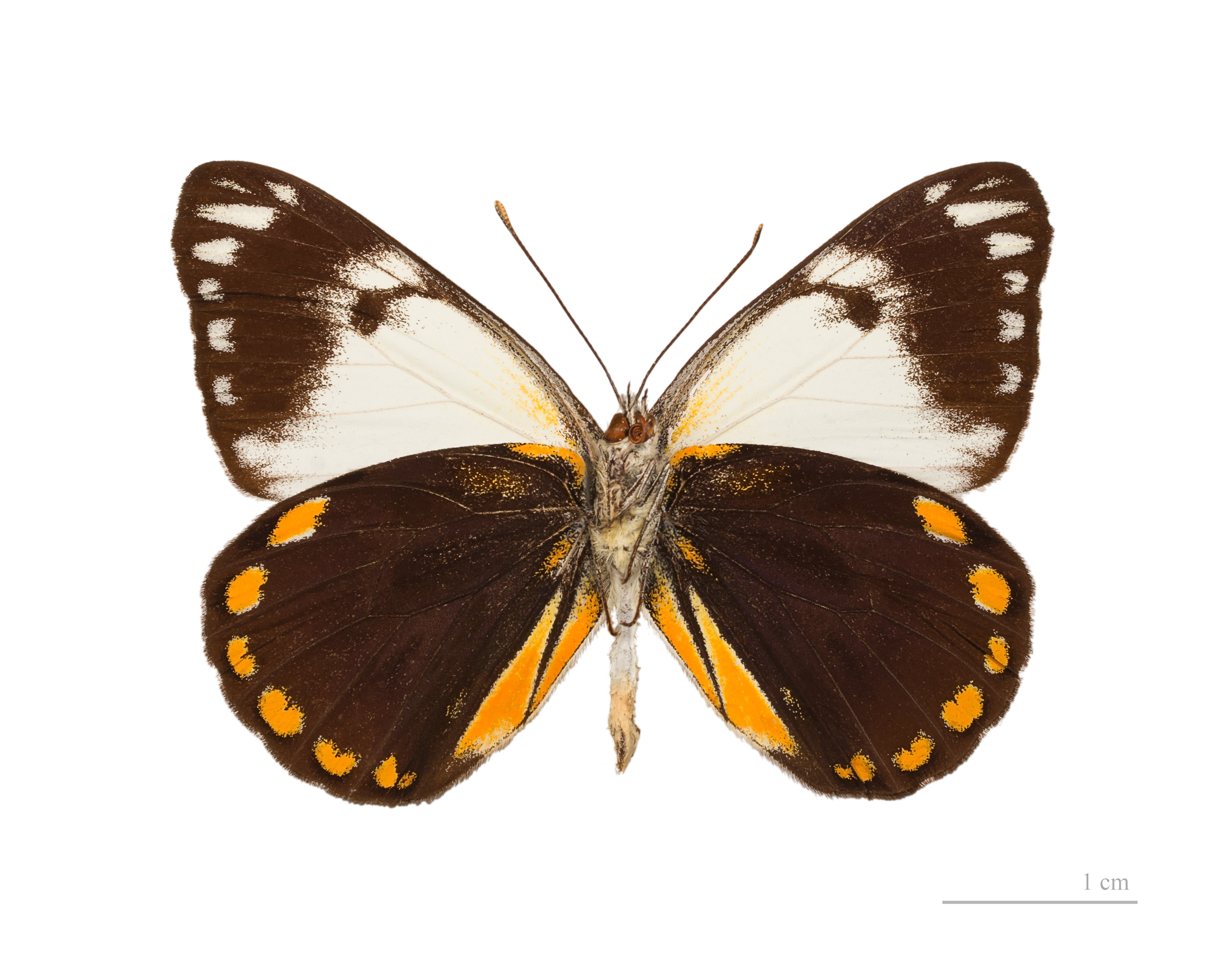
Female - ventral side

=== Immature ===
The first instar of this species is pale yellow sparsely covered in long hairs. The later instars of this species are dark brownish-green with white and yellow raised spots. The head has a V-shaped white mark and is shiny black. There are two lines of hair on the side of the caterpillar's 3-cm body in its later stages. The pupa is white with black markings and is about 2.5 cm. Eggs are small and orange.

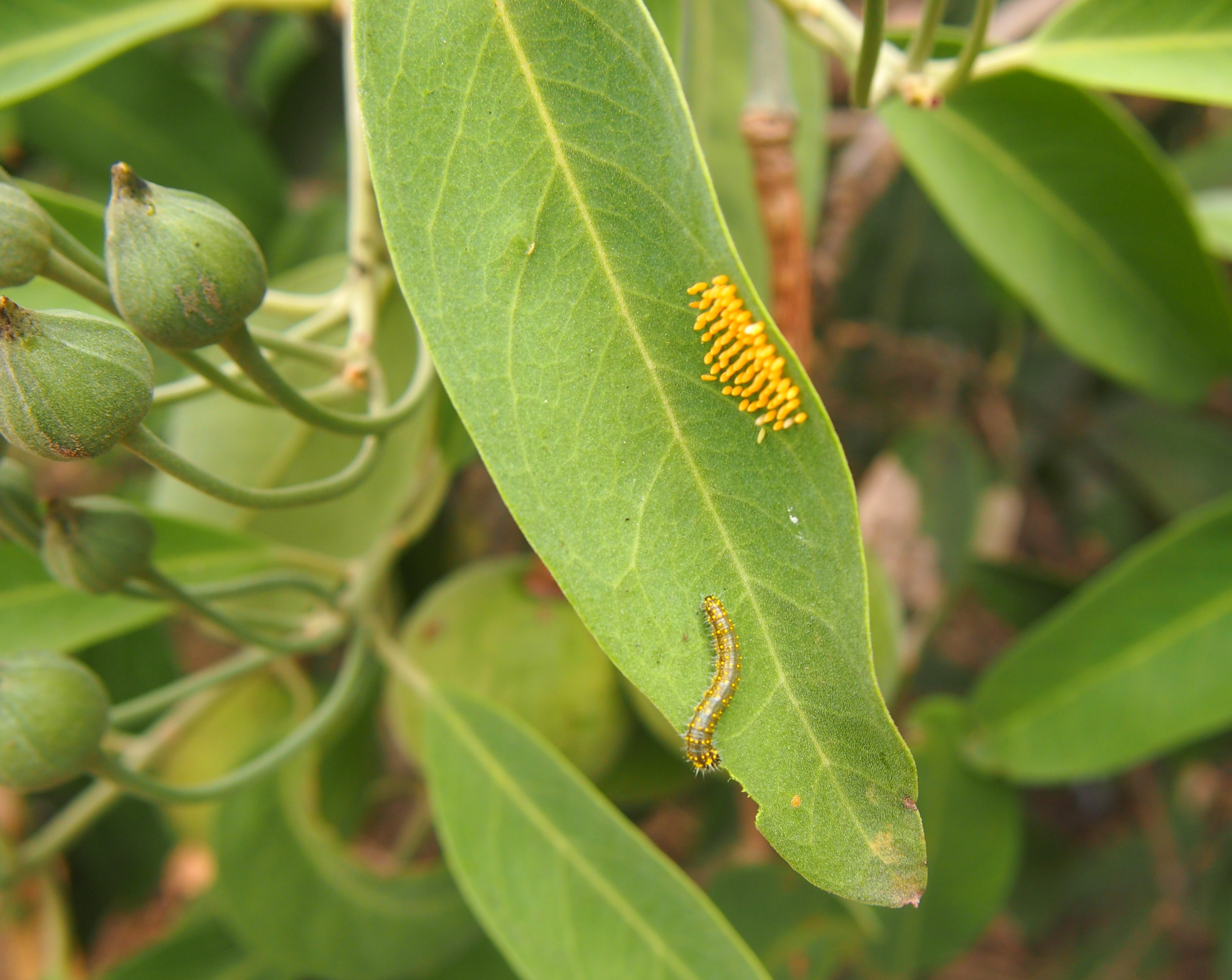
Larva and eggs

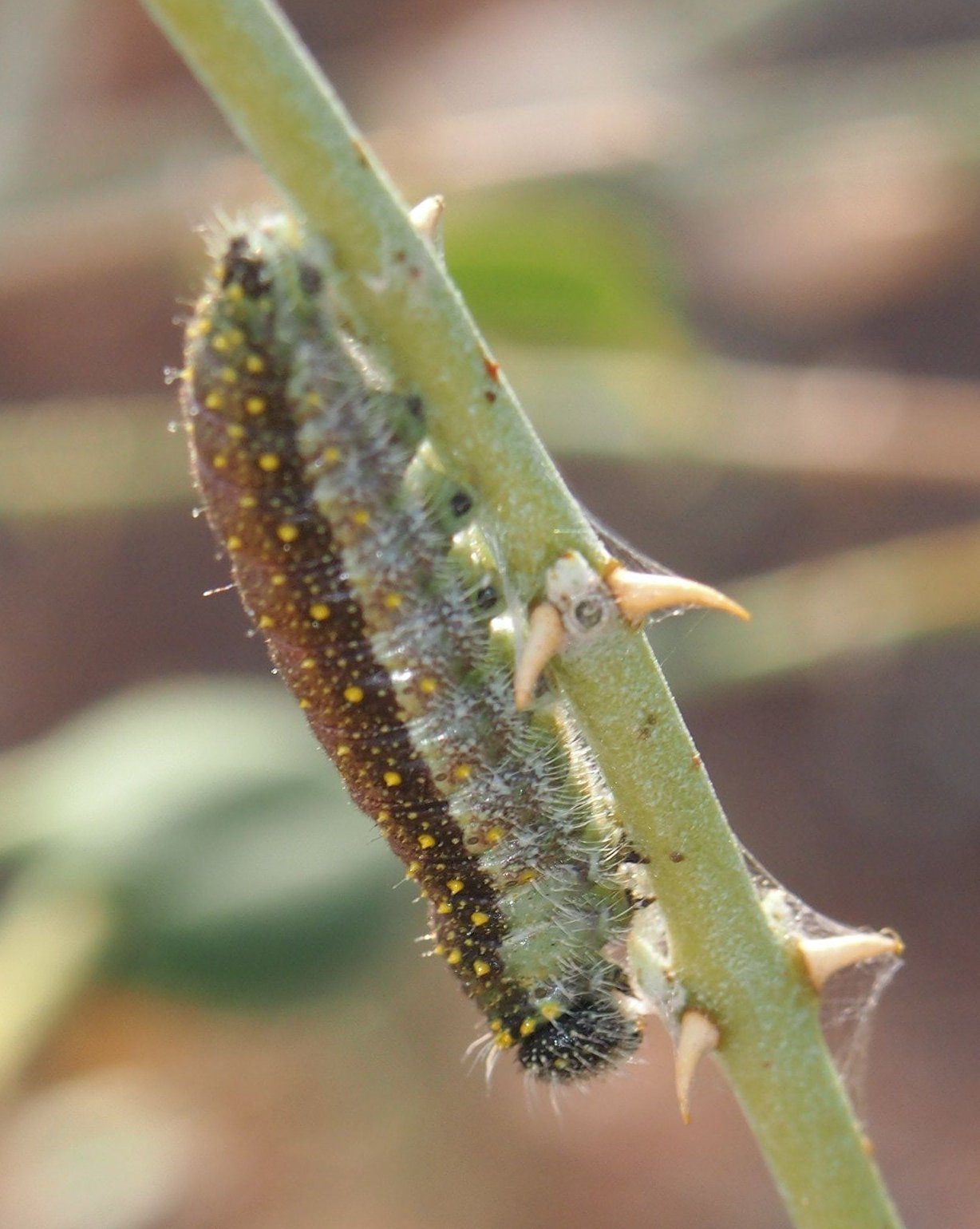
Older larva

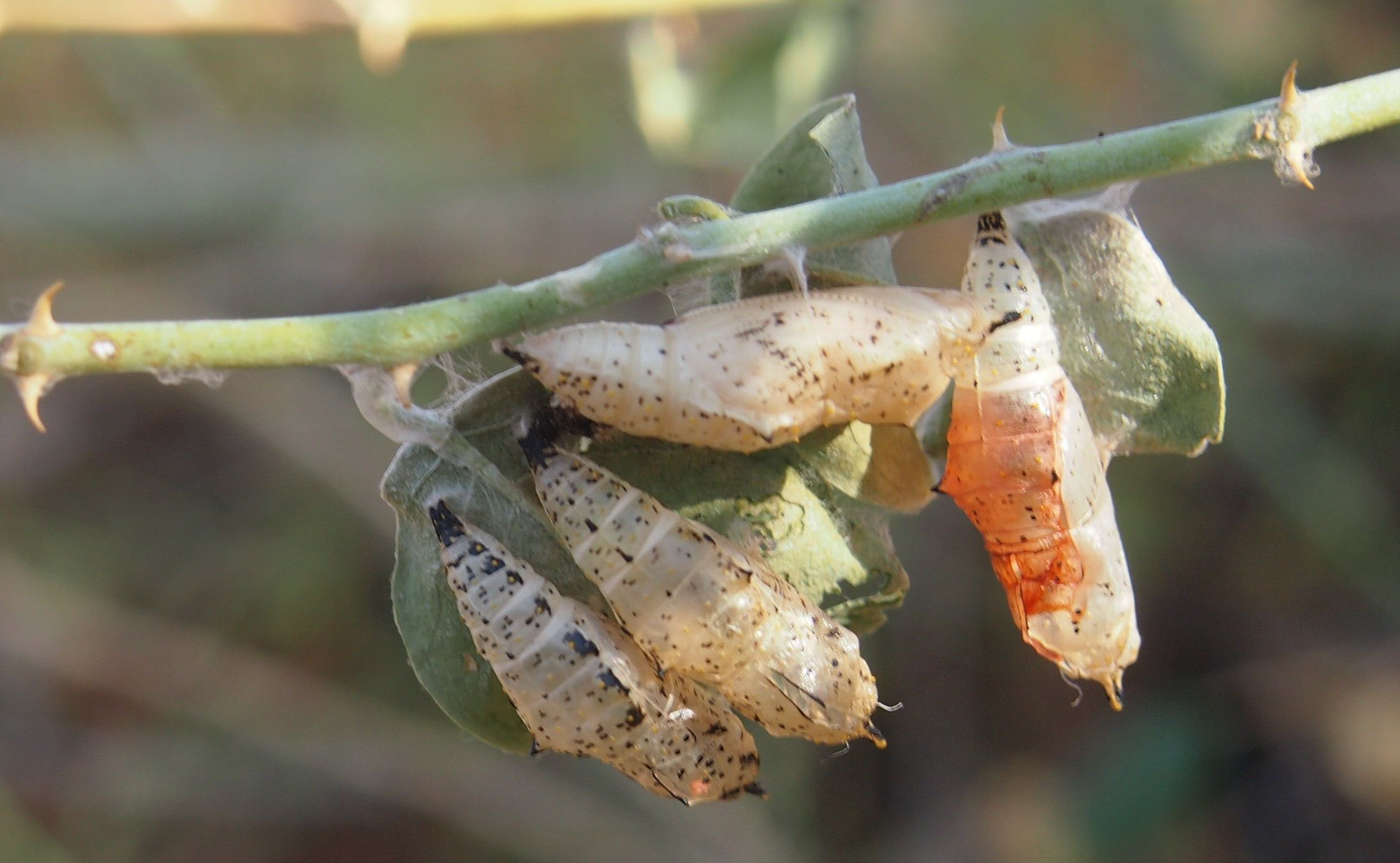
Pupal cases

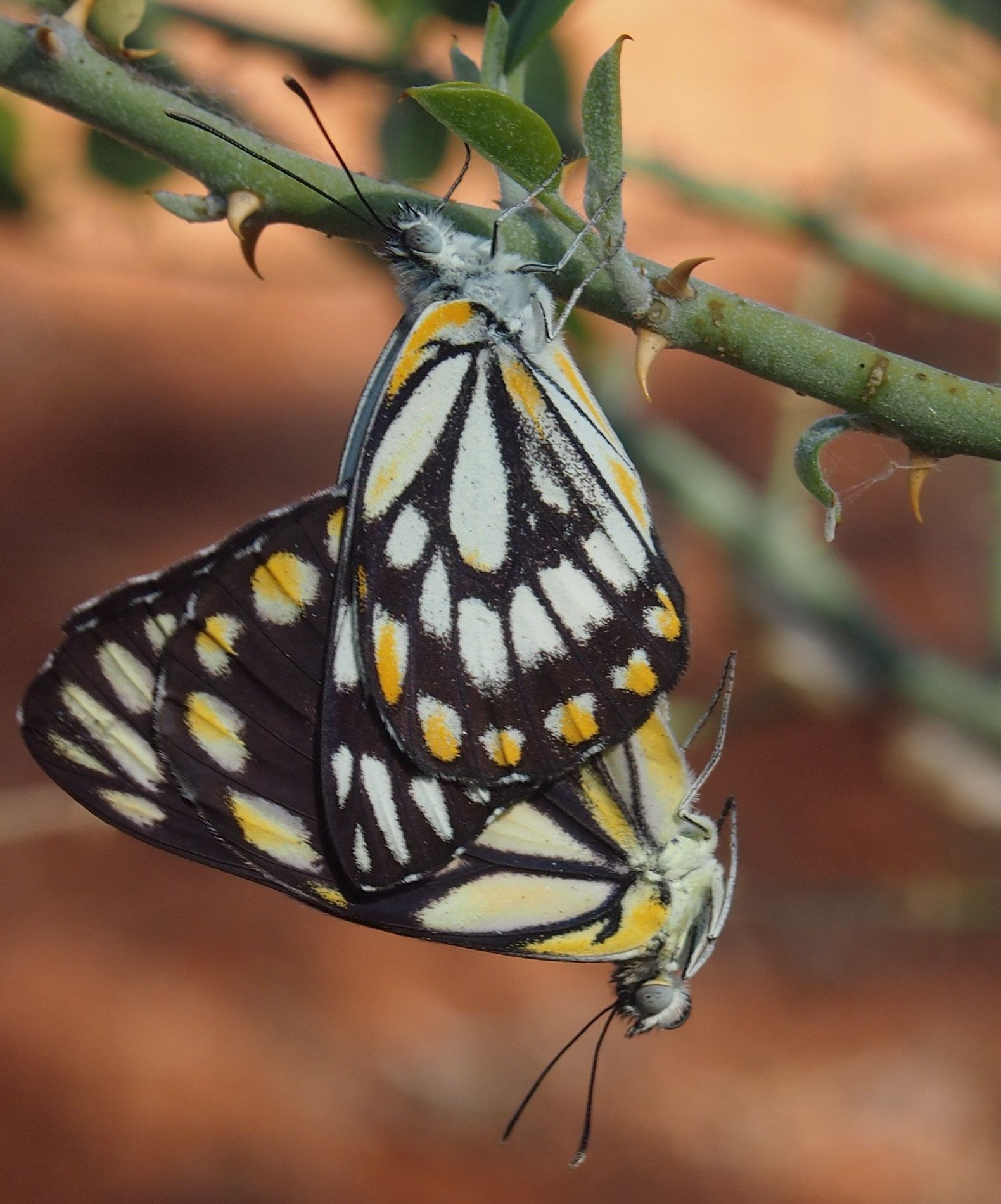
Mating adults

== Life cycle ==
Eggs are laid in groups on the top of the host plant's leaves. The caterpillar feeds on currant bush (Apophyllum anomalum), scrub caper berry (Capparis arborea), dog caper (Capparis canescens), nipan (Capparis lasiantha), Australian native orange (Capparis mitchellii), wild orange (Capparis sepiaria), Australian native caper (Capparis spinosa) and bush orange (Capparis umbonata). Unlike other caterpillars of its size the B. java feeds on a fairly minimal amount of food, making it less of an agricultural pest than the others. The caterpillars feed for about three weeks until fully grown and pupate. They emerge around December in much of their range.
