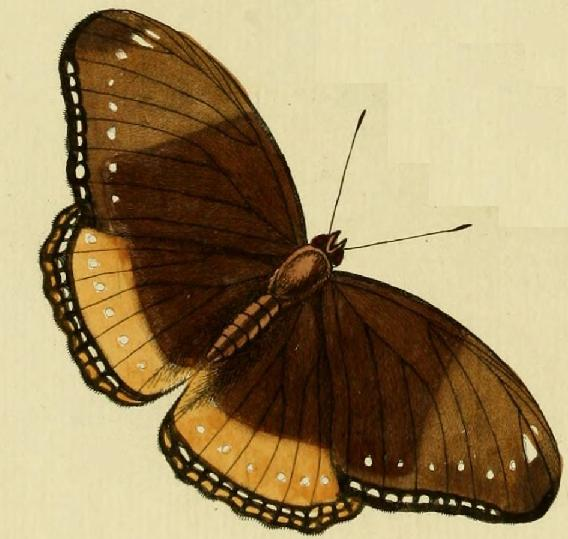

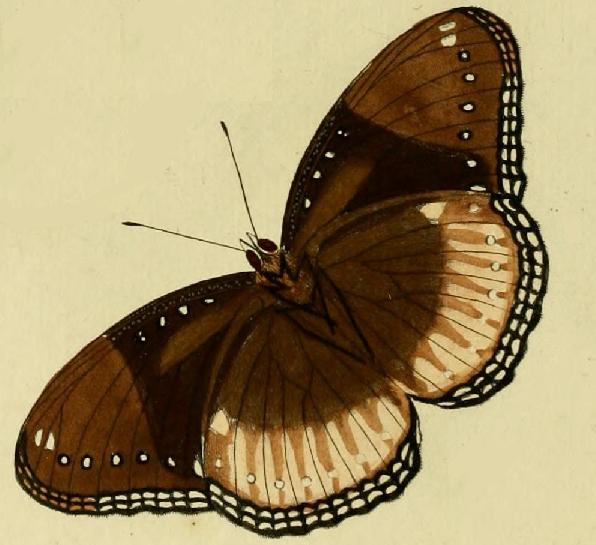

Scientific classification
- Domain: Eukaryota
- Kingdom: Animalia
- Phylum: Arthropoda
- Class: Insecta
- Order: Lepidoptera
- Family: Nymphalidae
- Genus: Hypolimnas
- Species: H. antilope

Binomial name
- Hypolimnas antilope (Cramer, [1777])

Synonyms
- Papilio antilope Cramer, [1777]; Hypolimnas violaria Fruhstorfer, 1912; Hypolimnas pseudopithoeca Fruhstorfer, 1912; Hypolimnas circumscripta Fruhstorfer, 1912; Diadema albula Wallace, 1869; Diadema lutescens Butler, 1874; Hypolimnas shortlandica Ribbe, 1898; Diadema scopas Godman & Salvin, 1888

= Hypolimnas antilope =

Species of butterfly

Hypolimnas antilope, the spotted crow eggfly, is a butterfly of the family Nymphalidae. It is found from Malaya to the Philippines, New Guinea and Australia.

The larvae feed on Asystasia, Graptophyllum, Pseuderanthemum, Oreocnide and Pipturus species (including Pipturus argenteus).

== Subspecies ==
- Hypolimnas antilope antilope (Ambon, Serang, Saparua, Sula, Maluku)
- Hypolimnas antilope albomela Howarth, 1962 (Solomons: Rennell Island)
- Hypolimnas antilope albula (Wallace, 1869) (Timor)
- Hypolimnas antilope lutescens (Butler, 1874) (Fiji)
- Hypolimnas antilope maglovius Fruhstorfer, 1912 (Buru)
- Hypolimnas antilope mela Fruhstorfer, 1903 (south-eastern New Guinea, Papua)
- Hypolimnas antilope phalkes Fruhstorfer, 1908 (Talaud, Sangihe)
- Hypolimnas antilope quinctinus Fruhstorfer, 1912 (Obi, Bachan, Halmahera)
- Hypolimnas antilope scopas (Godman & Salvin, 1888) (Solomons: Malaita)
- Hypolimnas antilope shortlandica Ribbe, 1898 (Solomons: Shortland Island)
- Hypolimnas antilope sila Fruhstorfer, 1912 (Seram)
- Hypolimnas antilope typhlis Fruhstorfer, 1912 (Key Island)
- Hypolimnas antilope wagneri Clark, 1946 (Admiralty Islands)
