= Janson (surname) =

Janson is a surname, and may refer to:

- Agnes Janson (1861–1947), Swedish mezzo-soprano singer
- Aleksander Janson (1881–1939), Estonian politician
- Alfred Janson (1937–2019), Norwegian pianist and composer
- Andrew Janson (1935–2007), South African rugby union footballer
- Anton Janson (1620–1687), Dutch printer and typographer after whom the font "Janson" is named
- Astrid Janson (born 1947), Canadian set and costume designe
- August Janson (1870–1925), Estonian politician
- Bengan Janson (born 1963), Swedish accordionist
- Beth Janson, Canadian film industry executive
- Cassidy Janson (born 1980), British actress
- Charles Auguste Marie Joseph, Comte de Forbin-Janson (1785–1844), French Bishop of Nancy and Toul, and founder of the Association of the Holy Childhood
- Chris Janson (born 1986), American country music singer and songwriter
- Ciara Janson (born 1987), English actress
- David Janson (born 1950), English actor and theatre director, father of Ciara Janson
- Dora Jane Janson (1916–2002), American art historian, collaborator of her husband H. W. Janson
- Edward Mason Janson (1847–1880), British entomologist in Nicaragua, son of Edward Wesley Janson
- Edward Wesley Janson (1822–1891), English entomologist
- Ernest A. Janson (1878–1930), United States Marine
- Gunnar Janson (1901–1983), Norwegian sculptor
- Herman Didrich Janson (1757–1822), Norwegian shipper and businessman
- Henrik Janson (born 1961), Swedish musician and record producer
- Horst Janson (actor) (1935–2025), German film and television actor
- H. W. Janson (1913–1982), American art historian
- Jamie Janson (1975–2019), British aid worker
- Jean-Baptiste Janson (1742–1803), French cellist and composer
- Johannes Ludwig Janson (1849–1914), German veterinary scientist
- Jonathan Janson (painter) (born 1950), American painter and art historian
- Jonathan Janson (sailor) (1930–2015), British competitive sailor
- Josephine Janson (born 1991), Swedish golfer
- Karin Stahre-Janson (born 1956/7), Swedish cruise ship captain
- Klaus Janson (born 1952), American comic book artist
- Kristofer Janson (1841–1917), Norwegian poet, author and Unitarian clergyman
- Lacy Janson (born 1983), American track and field athlete
- Len Janson, American animated film director and writer
- Lucas Janson (born 1994), Argentine footballer
- Marc Janson (1930–2022), Belgian-French painter
- Marie Janson (1873–1960), Belgian politician, sister of Paul-Émile Janson
- Mette Janson (1934–2004), Norwegian journalist
- Mihkel Janson (born 1888), Estonian politician
- Nikolai Janson (1882–1938), Estonian revolutionary and Soviet politician
- Nils Janson (born 1978), Swedish jazz trumpeter
- Oliver Erichson Janson (1850–1925), English entomologist, son of Edward Wesley Janson
- Oscar Janson (born 1975), Swedish pole vaulter
- Paul Janson (1840–1913), Belgian politician, father of Paul-Émile Janson and Marie Janson
- Paul-Émile Janson (1872–1944), Belgian politician, brother of Marie Janson
- Pauline Janson (born 1957), British rower
- Peter Janson (born 1940), Australian motor racing driver
- Robert Janson (born 1965), Polish composer, singer and guitarist
- Roland Janson (1939–2019), Swedish actor
- Selmar Janson (1881–1960), German-American pianist and teacher
- Svante Janson (born 1955), Swedish mathematician
- Tore Janson (born 1936), Swedish linguist
- Toussaint de Forbin-Janson (1631–1713), French cardinal
- Uwe Janson (born 1959), German screenwriter, director and producer
- Victor Janson (1884–1960), German actor and film director

== Fictional characters ==
- Paul Janson, the protagonist of The Janson Directive, a novel by Robert Ludlum
- Wes Janson, an X-Wing pilot in Rogue Squadron in the Star Wars movies and expanded universe novels

== See also ==
- Janson (name)]]
