= Edward Janson =

Edward Janson may refer to:

- Edward Wesley Janson (1822–1891), English entomologist
- Edward Mason Janson (1847–1880), his son, British entomologist
