= Birchwood Mansions, Muswell Hill =

Coordinates: 51°35′26″N 0°08′52″W

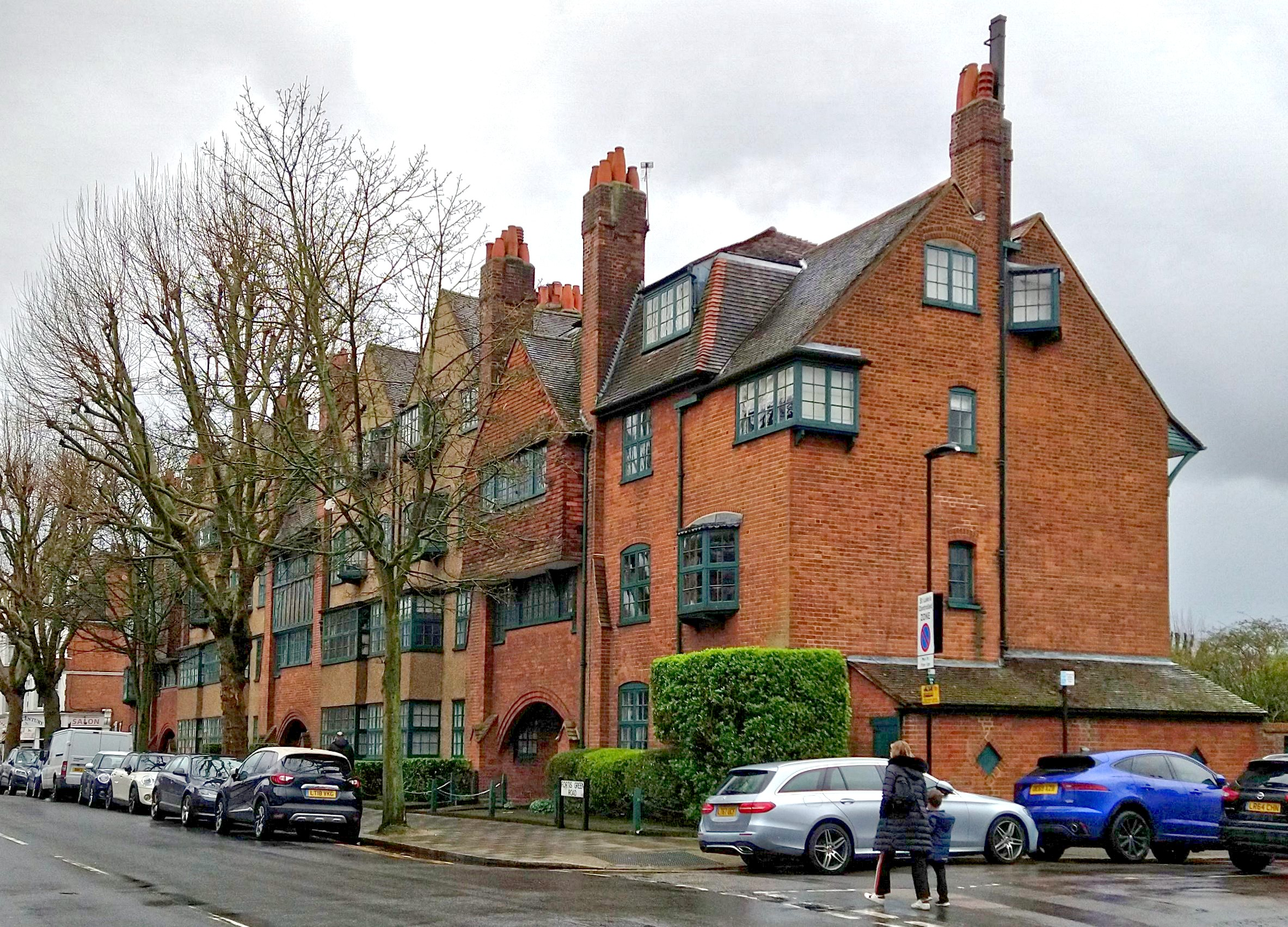
Birchwood Mansions

Birchwood Mansions is a block of flats in Fortis Green Road, Muswell Hill, London, and a grade II listed building with Historic England. The building was constructed in 1907 to a design by W.J. and William Collins in the Arts and Crafts style.

== Gallery ==
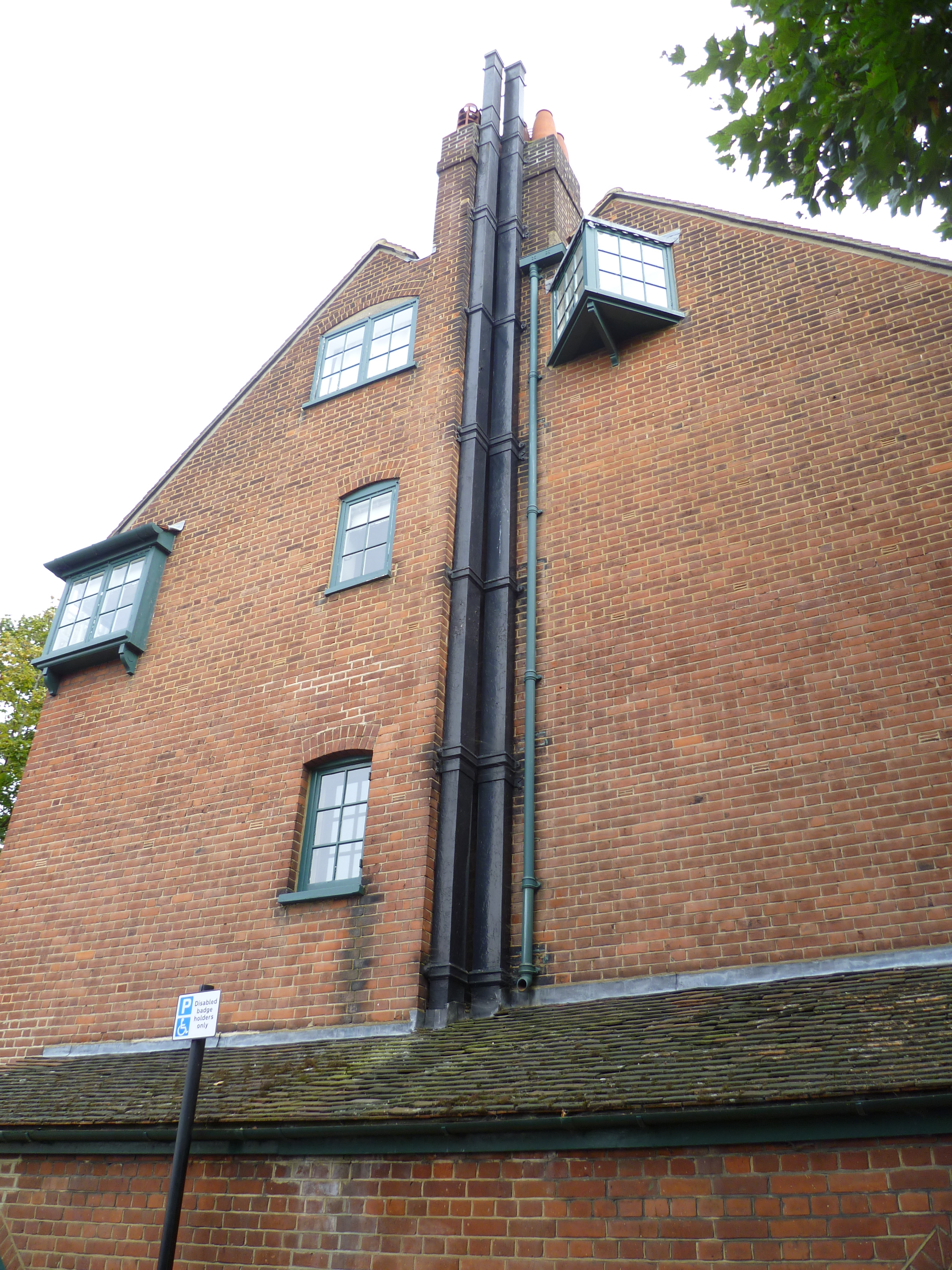

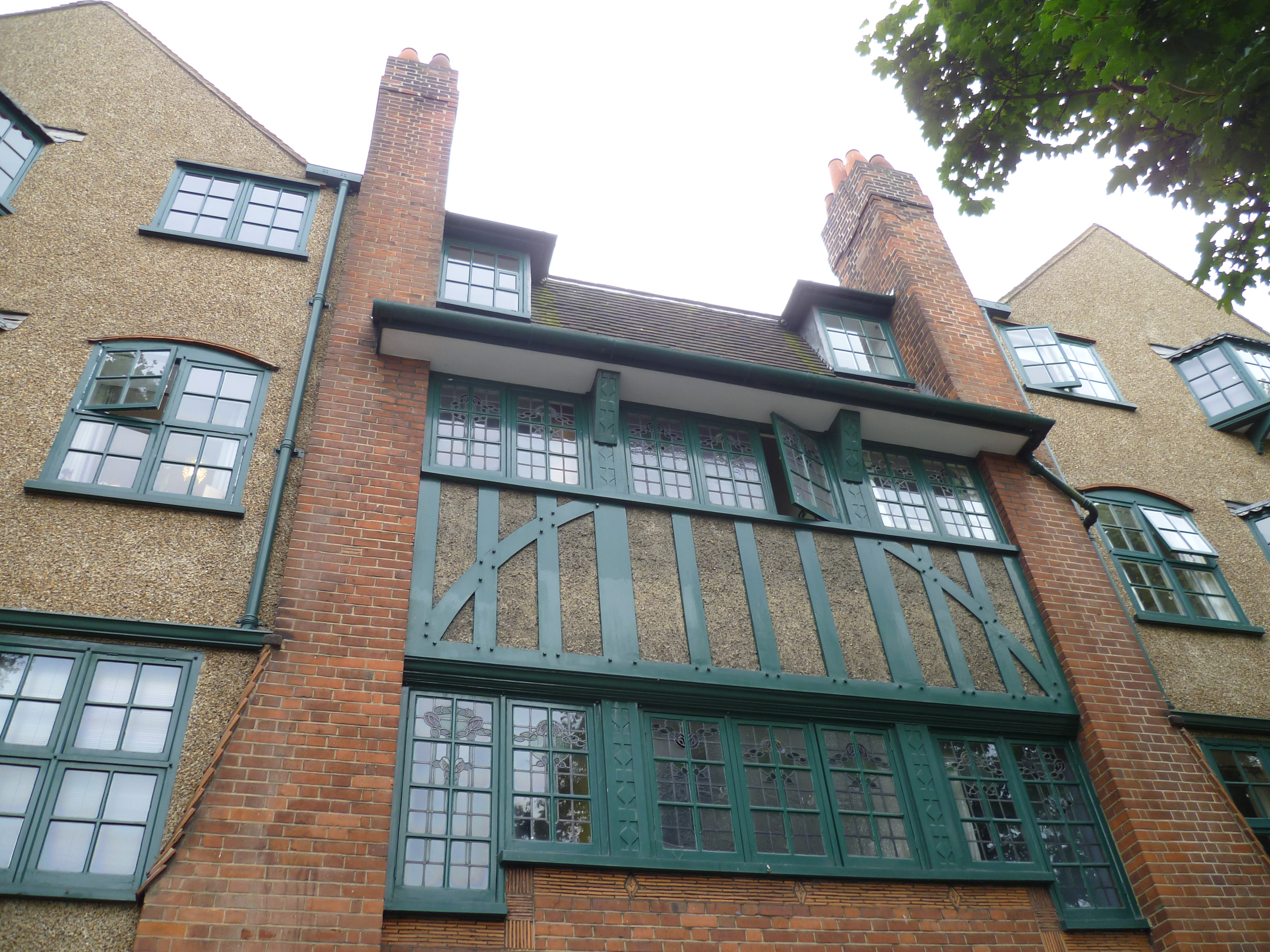

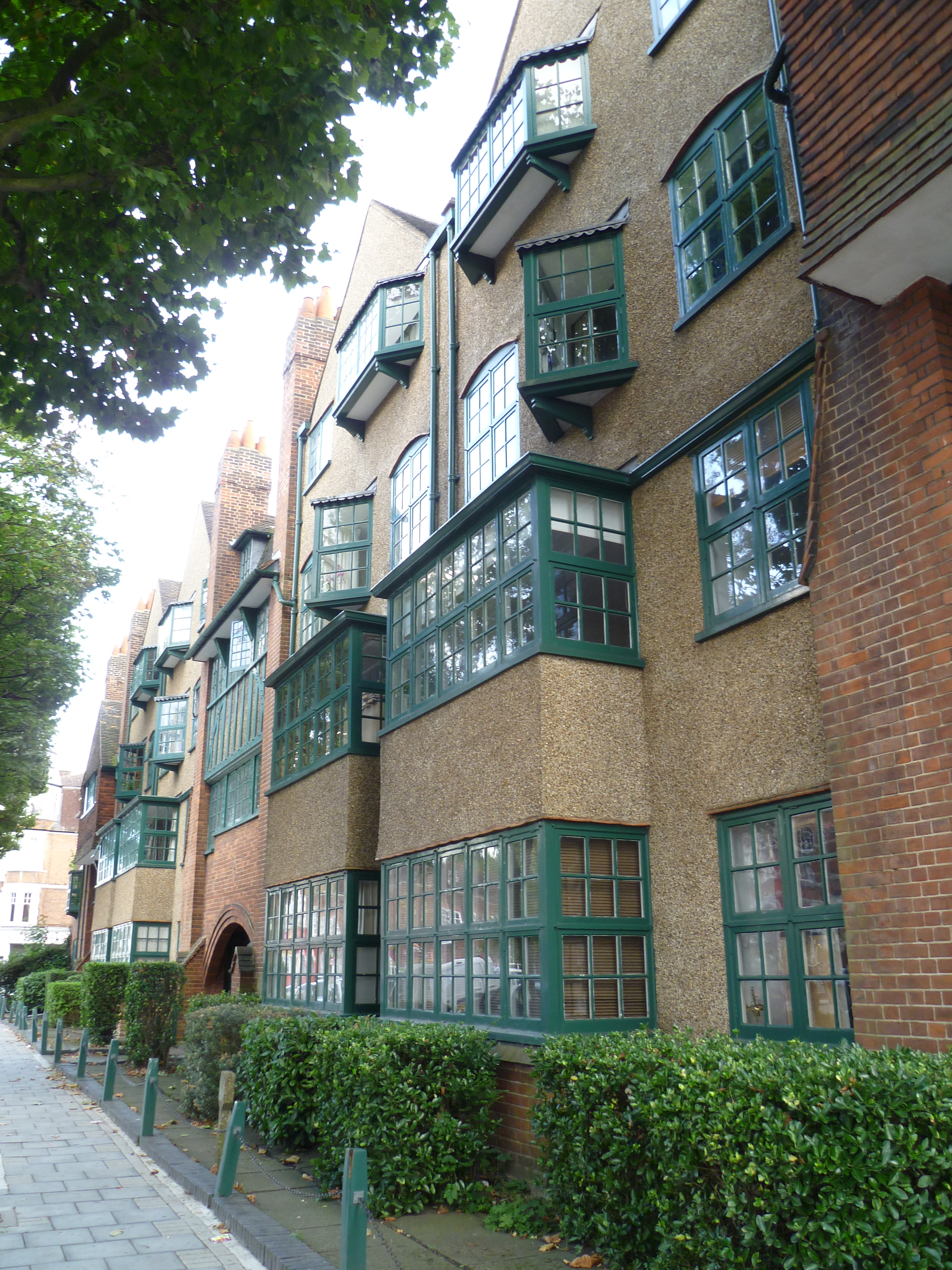

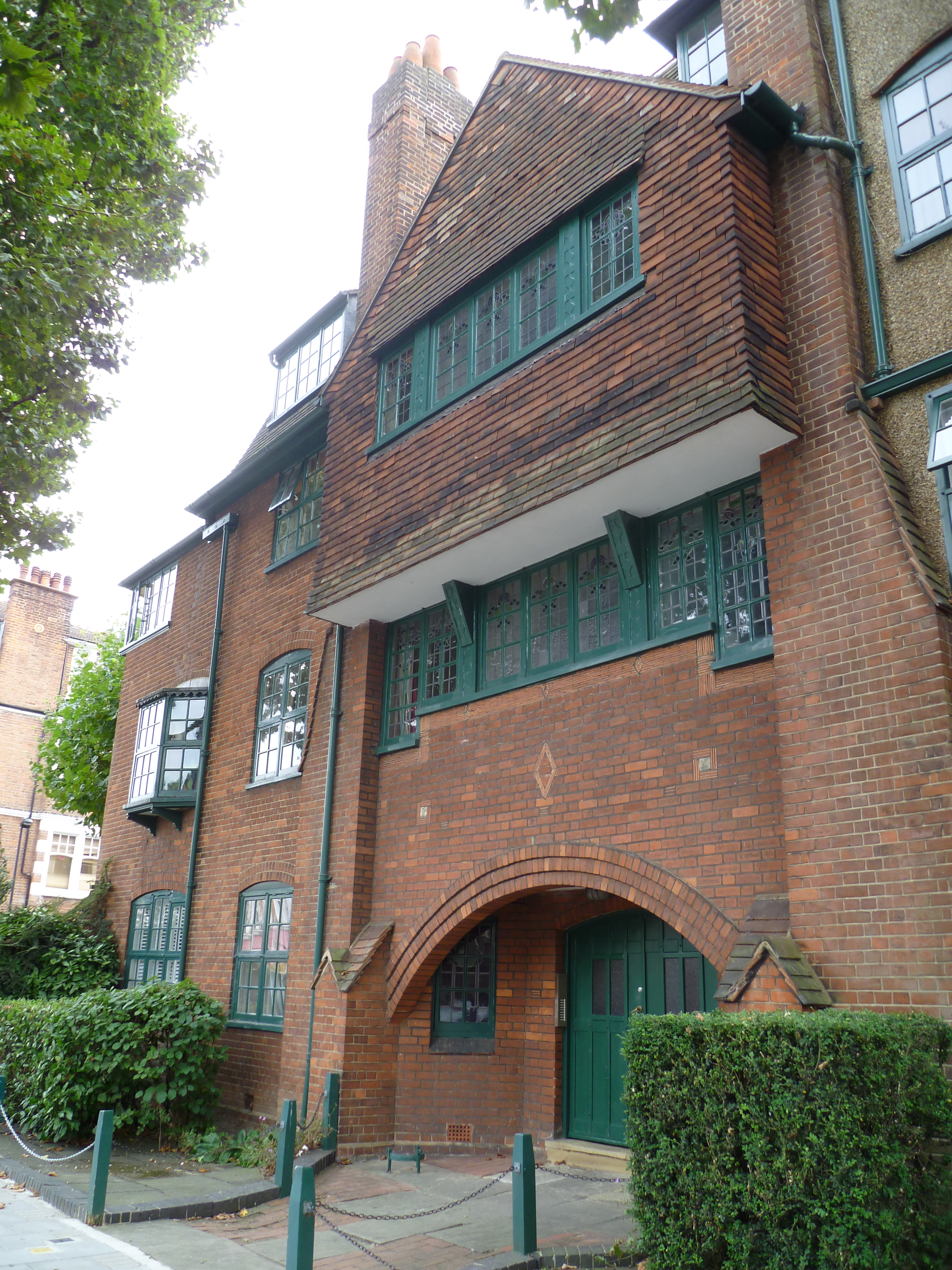

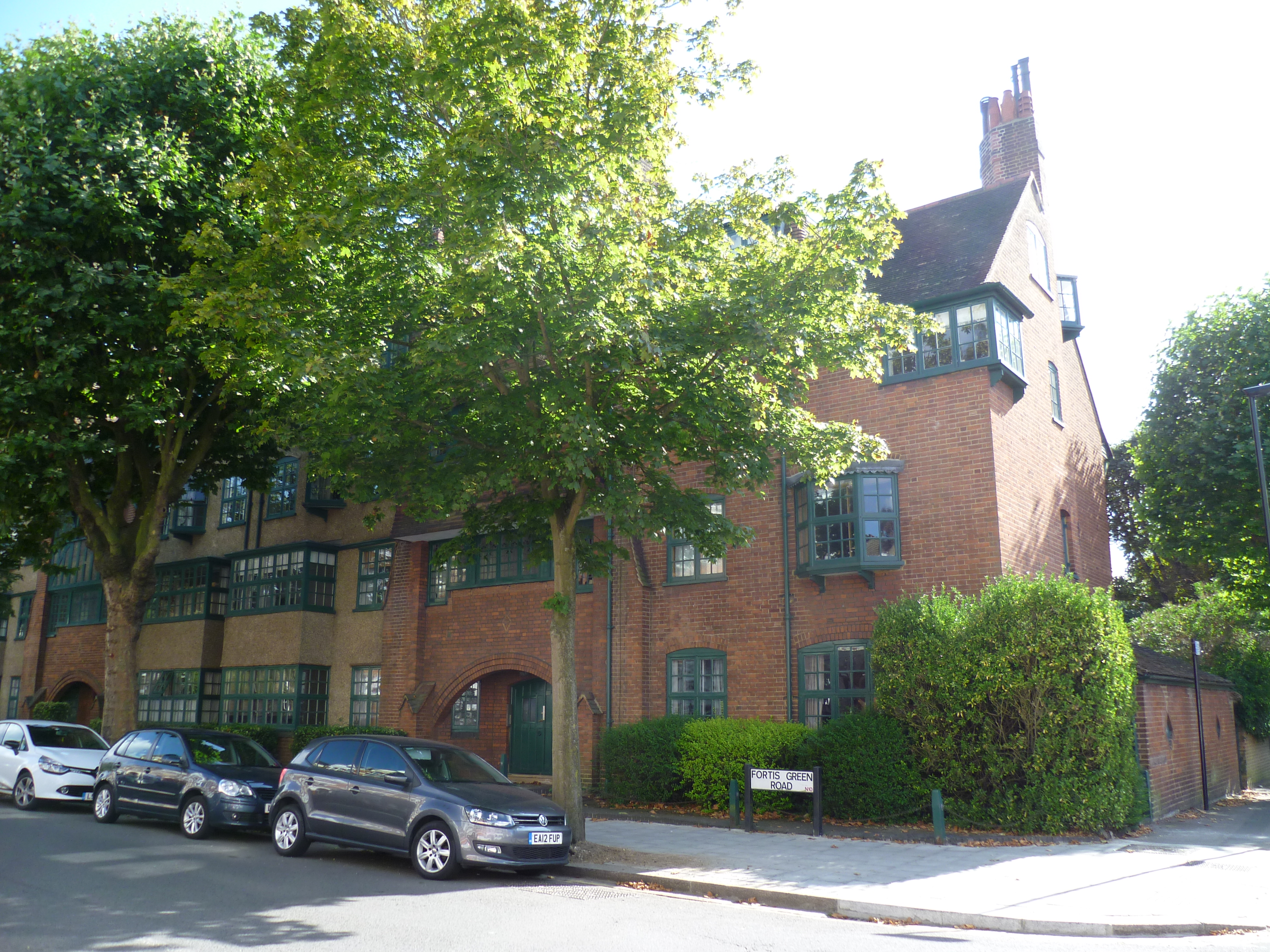

== See also ==
- The Gables
