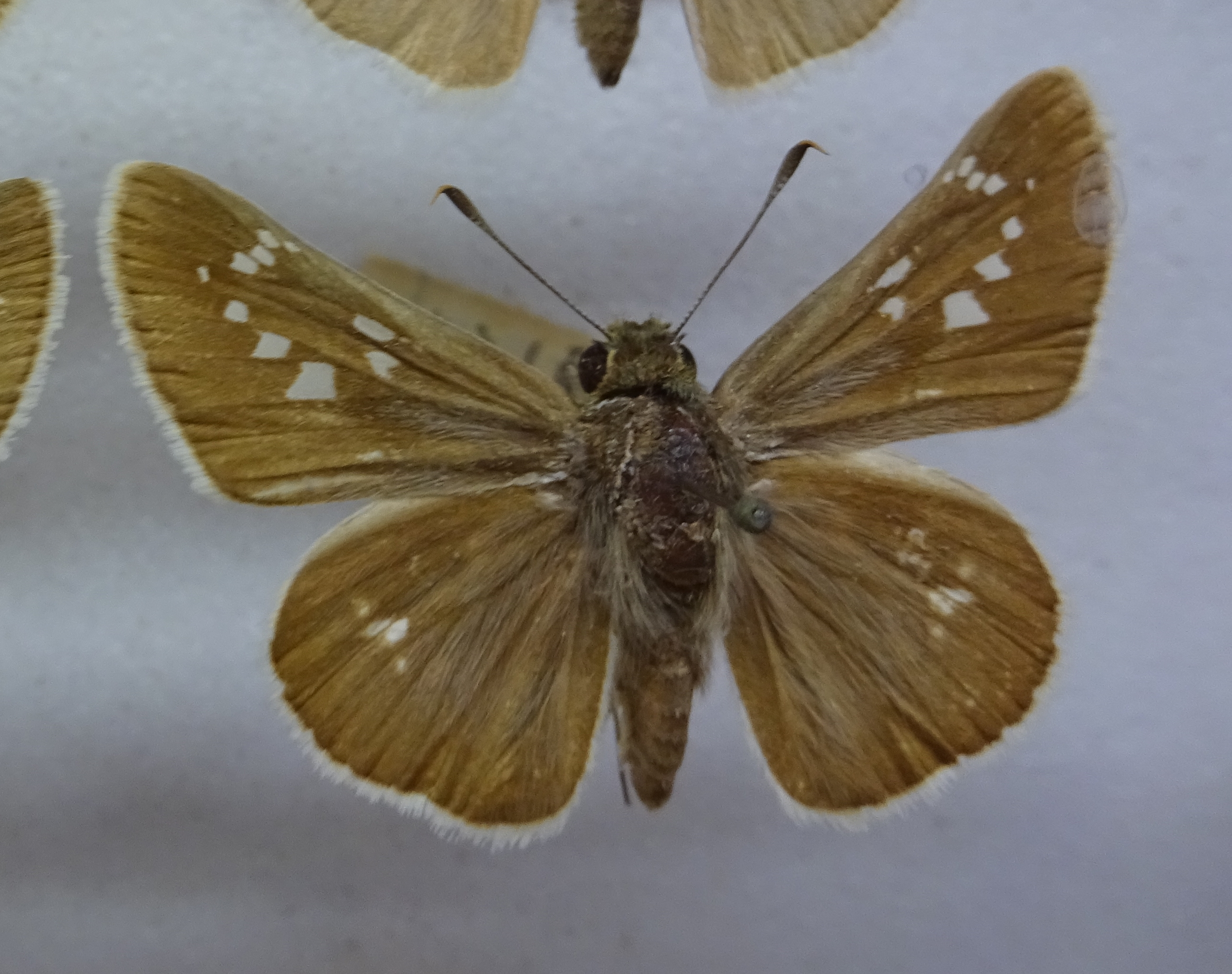

Scientific classification
- Kingdom: Animalia
- Phylum: Arthropoda
- Class: Insecta
- Order: Lepidoptera
- Family: Hesperiidae
- Genus: Pelopidas
- Species: P. jansonis

Binomial name
- Pelopidas jansonis (Butler, 1878)

Synonyms
- Pamphila jansonis Butler, 1878

= Pelopidas jansonis =

Species of butterfly

Pelopidas jansonis is a butterfly in the family Hesperiidae (Hesperiinae). It is endemic to Japan. The larva feeds on Miseanthus (Graminea). There are two broods. The larva of the second brood hibernates.

== Etymology ==
The specific name honours Edward Wesley Janson.
