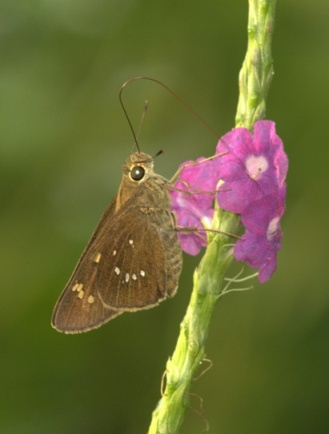

Scientific classification
- Domain: Eukaryota
- Kingdom: Animalia
- Phylum: Arthropoda
- Class: Insecta
- Order: Lepidoptera
- Family: Hesperiidae
- Genus: Pelopidas
- Species: P. conjuncta

Binomial name
- Pelopidas conjuncta (Herrich-Schäffer, 1869)

= Pelopidas conjuncta =

Conjoined swift

Species of butterfly

Pelopidas conjuncta, the conjoined swift, is a species of butterfly belonging to the family Hesperiidae found in India.

== Description ==
Male. Upperside dark olive-brown. Forewing with nine semi-diaphanous yellowish-white spots, two in the cell towards its end, one above the other, well separated, touching the margins of the cell; three small sub-apical spots of equal size, in an outwardly oblique well-curved line, the others in an inwardly oblique discal series, one in each interspace, the spot near the base of the first median interspace the largest of the series, its lower end produced outwards, the spot above it about half its size, with its outer lower end also somewhat produced, the upper small spot about the size of the sub-apical spots, a spot at the middle of the sub-median vein. Hindwing with two or three small discal spots and a white spot near the upper end of the cell. Cilia of forewing cinereous, of hindwing whitish, with cinereous base. Underside paler. Forewing with the spots as on the upperside. Hindwing with a small white spot near the upper end of the cell and a discal series of small white spots. Antennae black, the tip of the club pale red, the shaft and club on the underside whitish, the shaft spotted with black; palpi, head and body concolorous with the wings, palpi whitish beneath, the abdomen beneath smeared with whitish, legs tinged with dull red. Female like the male, the spots of the forewing usually larger, and consequently closer together, the largest spot of the discal series usually much larger.

— Charles Swinhoe, Lepidoptera Indica. Vol. X

== Subspecies ==
- Pelopidas conjuncta conjuncta (N.Vietnam, Laos, Thailand and India (Himachal Pradesh to N.E. India; Andaman & Nicobar Is.))
- Pelopidas conjuncta narooa Moore, 1878 (India (Gujarat to Kerala and Jharkhand) and Sri Lanka)

== Biology ==
The larvae are known to breed on Bambusa, Coix lacryma-jobi, Oryza sativa, Saccharum officinarum, Sorghum halepense, Triplopogon ramosissimus, Zea mays, Rottboellia and cochinchinensis.

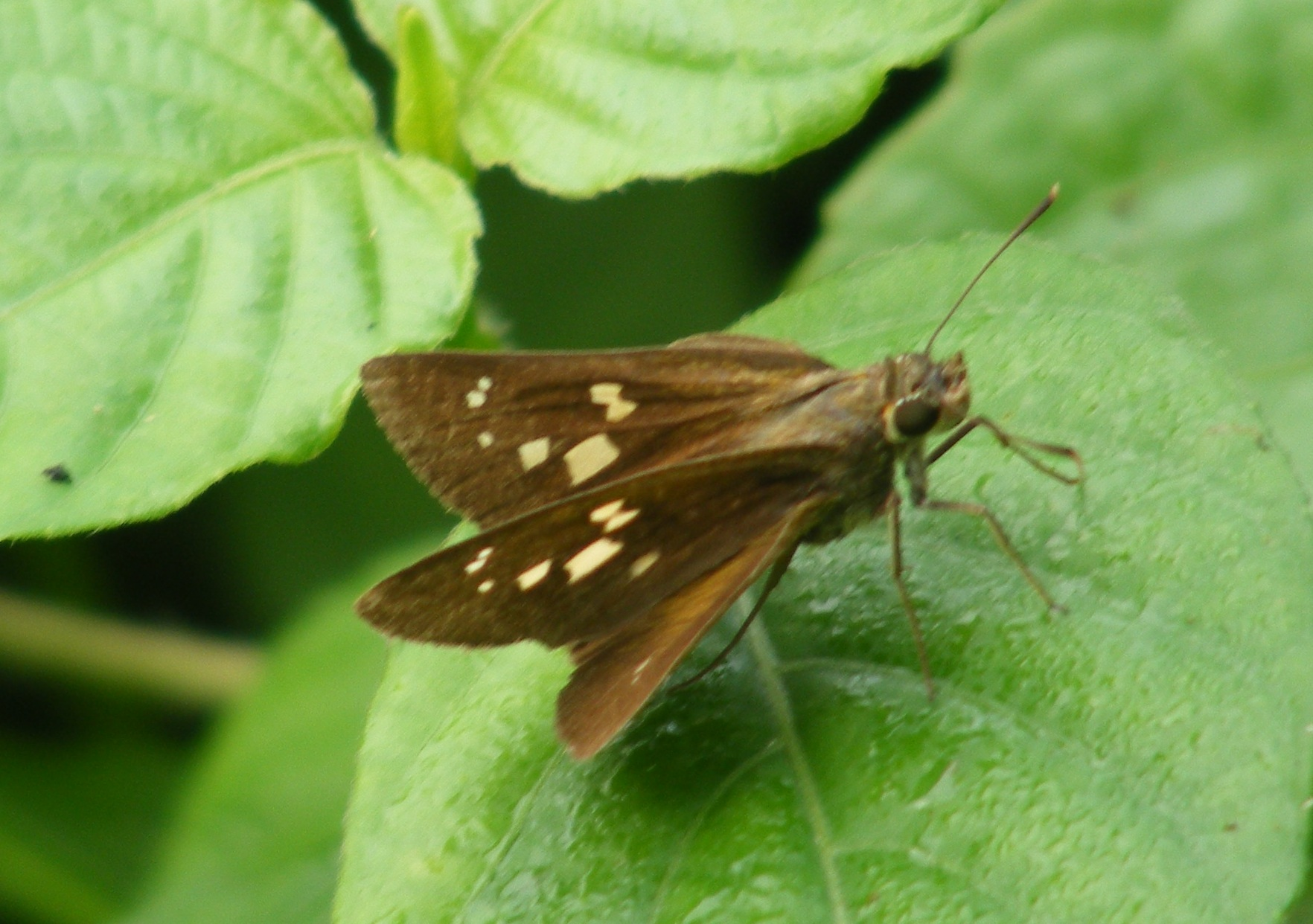
From Singapore
