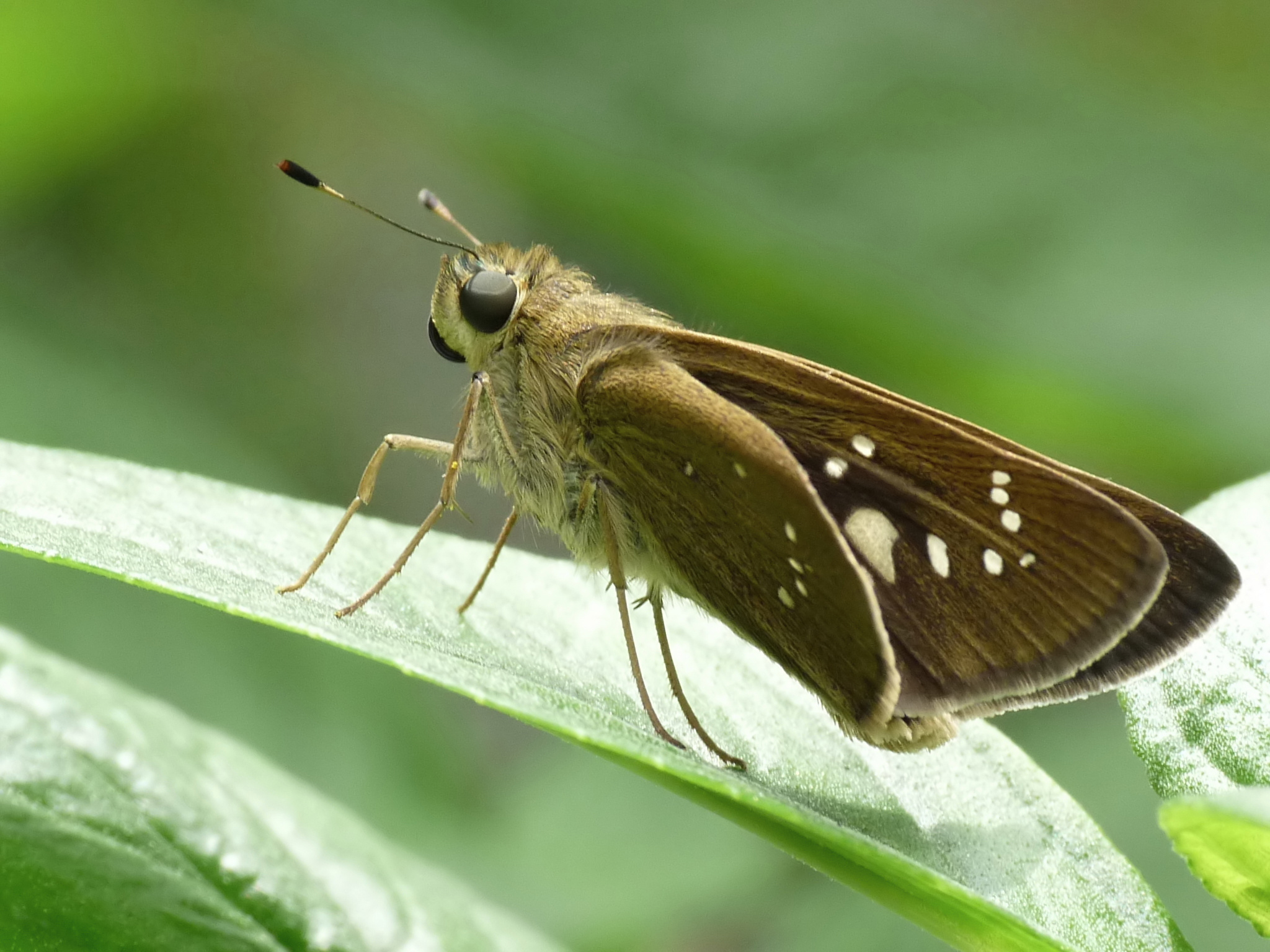

Scientific classification
- Domain: Eukaryota
- Kingdom: Animalia
- Phylum: Arthropoda
- Class: Insecta
- Order: Lepidoptera
- Family: Hesperiidae
- Genus: Pelopidas
- Species: P. subochracea

Binomial name
- Pelopidas subochracea (Moore, 1878)

= Pelopidas subochracea =

Large branded swift

Species of butterfly

Pelopidas subochracea, the large branded swift, is a butterfly belonging to the family Hesperiidae found in India.

== Description ==
In 1891, Edward Yerbury Watson described it as:

Upperside glossy luteous olive-brown; cilia yellowish-cinereous. Male. Forewing with two pale semi-diaphanous spots at end of the cell, three contiguous spots obliquely before the apex, three upper discal spots, below which is a narrow white oblique streak or brand; hindwing with three small yellow upper discal spots, the two lowest small. Female. Forewing with a lower or fourth discal spot, and a small dot below the third spot; the spots angled outward: hindwing as in male. Underside greenish-ochreous, brown on hind border of forewing and anal lobe; marginal line brown and prominent: forewing with the lower spot diffused and white: hindwing with the upper discal white spot large and quadrate, four spots below in a slightly linear position, the upper spot indistinct; a white spot also at upper end of cell, and a smaller indistinct spot above it.
