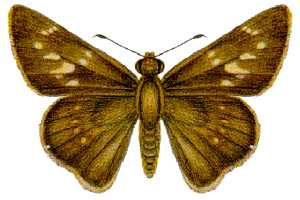

Scientific classification
- Domain: Eukaryota
- Kingdom: Animalia
- Phylum: Arthropoda
- Class: Insecta
- Order: Lepidoptera
- Family: Hesperiidae
- Genus: Pelopidas
- Species: P. lyelli

Binomial name
- Pelopidas lyelli (Rothschild, 1915)

= Pelopidas lyelli =

Species of butterfly

Pelopidas lyelli, the Lyell's swift, is a butterfly of the family Hesperiidae. It is found in New South Wales, the Northern Territory, Queensland and Western Australia, as well as Irian Jaya, Maluku, Papua New Guinea, the Solomon Islands and Vanuatu.

The wingspan is about 30 mm.
