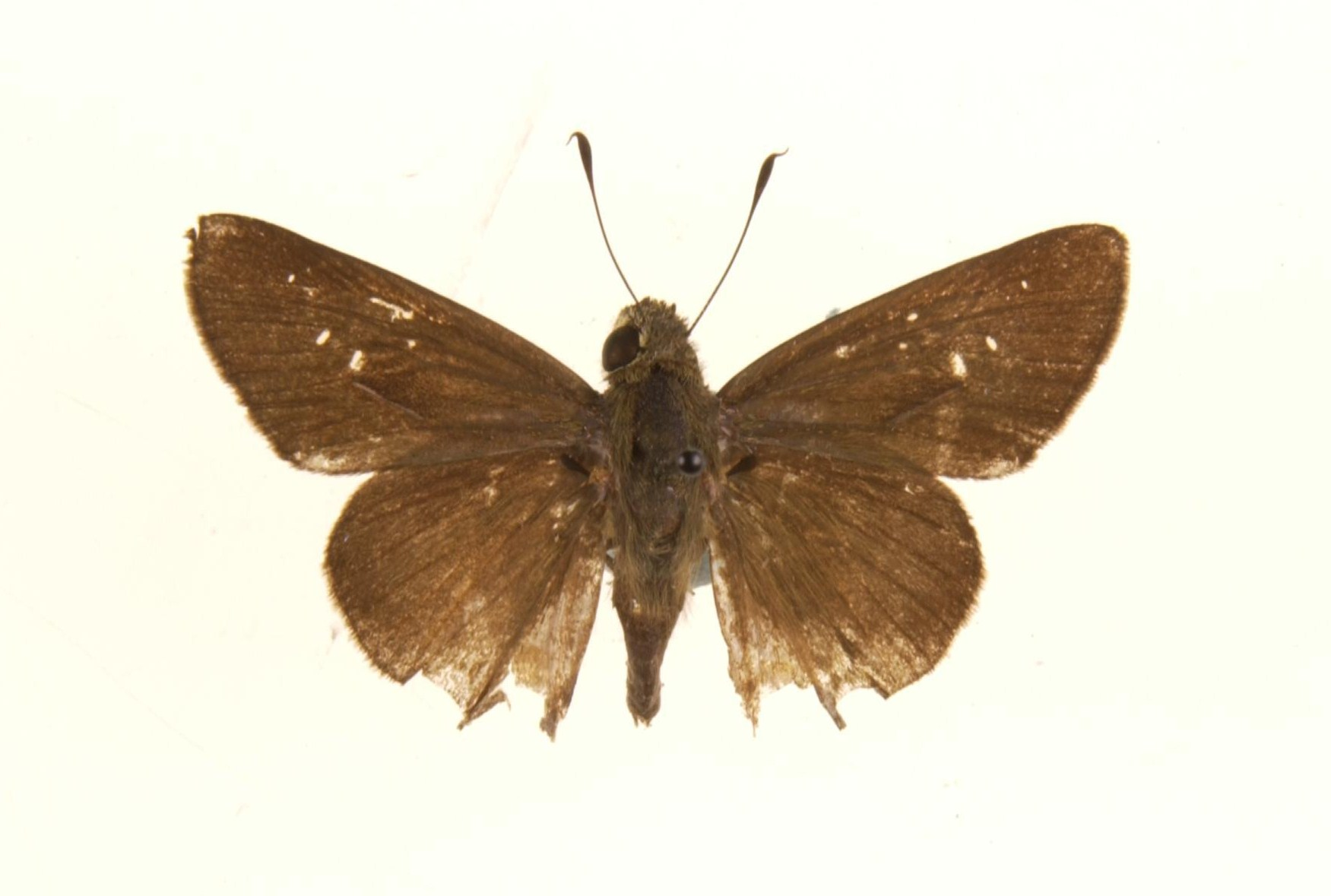

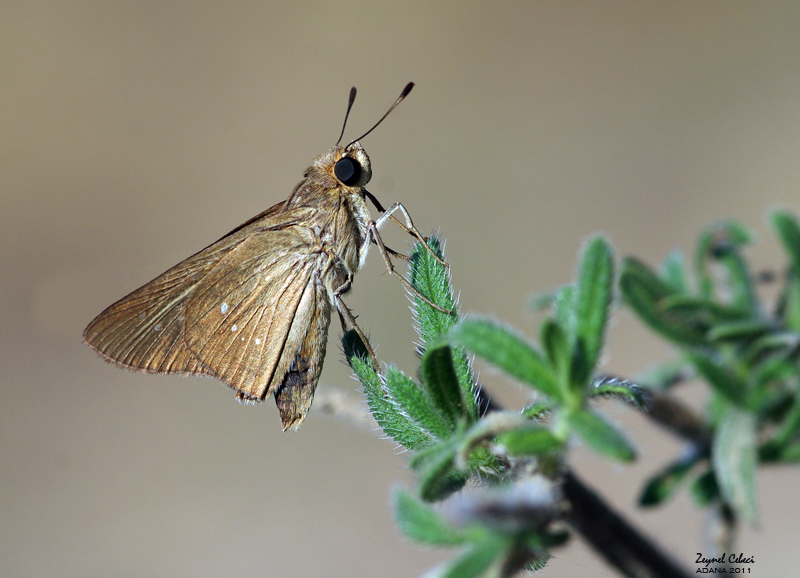

Scientific classification
- Kingdom: Animalia
- Phylum: Arthropoda
- Clade: Pancrustacea
- Class: Insecta
- Order: Lepidoptera
- Family: Hesperiidae
- Genus: Pelopidas
- Species: P. thrax

Binomial name
- Pelopidas thrax (Hübner, 1821)

Synonyms
- Gegenes thrax Hübner, [1821]; Pelopidas midea Walker, 1870; Hesperia inconspicua Bertolini, 1850; Pamphila mohopaani Wallengren; Pamphilia micipsa Trimen, 1862; Hesperia lodra Plötz, 1879

= Pelopidas thrax =

Pale small-branded swift

Species of butterfly

Pelopidas thrax, the pale small-branded swift, millet skipper or white branded swift, is a butterfly belonging to the family Hesperiidae. It is found in Greece, western and south-western Turkey, Israel, Lebanon, Syria, Iraq, Arabia, most of Africa even semi-arid countries as Burkina Faso, Kashmir (northern Pakistan) and the parts of the Far East. In Greece, it is only known from Samos, Chios, and Rhodes, where it is found at altitudes of sea level to 75 meters.

== Description ==
The ground colour of the fore and hind wings is brown. The upper side has a series of white spots of different sizes. Males have a narrow white scent scale patch on the upper surface of the forewings . The translucent spots are arranged differently from Gegenes nostrodamus and Gegenes pumilio .

The egg is yellowish at first and later becomes salmon-colored. It is flattened, approximately 0.9mm high and 1.5mm in diameter. The surface is covered with about 60 very fine elongated ribs, which take up about two-thirds of the height (calculated from the base). They intersect with horizontal lines. The larvae hatch after eight days.

The caterpillar is up to 35 mm long (L6 stage). The body is light green with a darker backline. The secondary back lines and the lateral lines are lighter than the basic colour. The head is light brown, often with a dark brown line around the head. Six larval stages are formed.

The pupa is approximately 32mm long, relatively slender with a 3mm long appendage on the head pointing slightly up or down. It is yellowish white with a slightly lighter subdorsal line. The proboscis sheath extends a segment beyond the wing sheaths.

== Biology ==
In Greece, adults are on wing in June. In Turkey, two generations were recorded, the first from May to July, the second from late September to mid October.

The larvae are known to feed on Panicum miliaceum in northern Africa. Larvae of subspecies P. t. inconspicua have been recorded feeding on Imperata arundinacea, Ehrharta erecta, Oryza and Imperata species.

== Subspecies ==
- Pelopidas thrax thrax
- Pelopidas thrax inconspicua (Bertolini, 1850) (from South Africa to Kenya)
- Pelopidas thrax masta Evans, 1949
