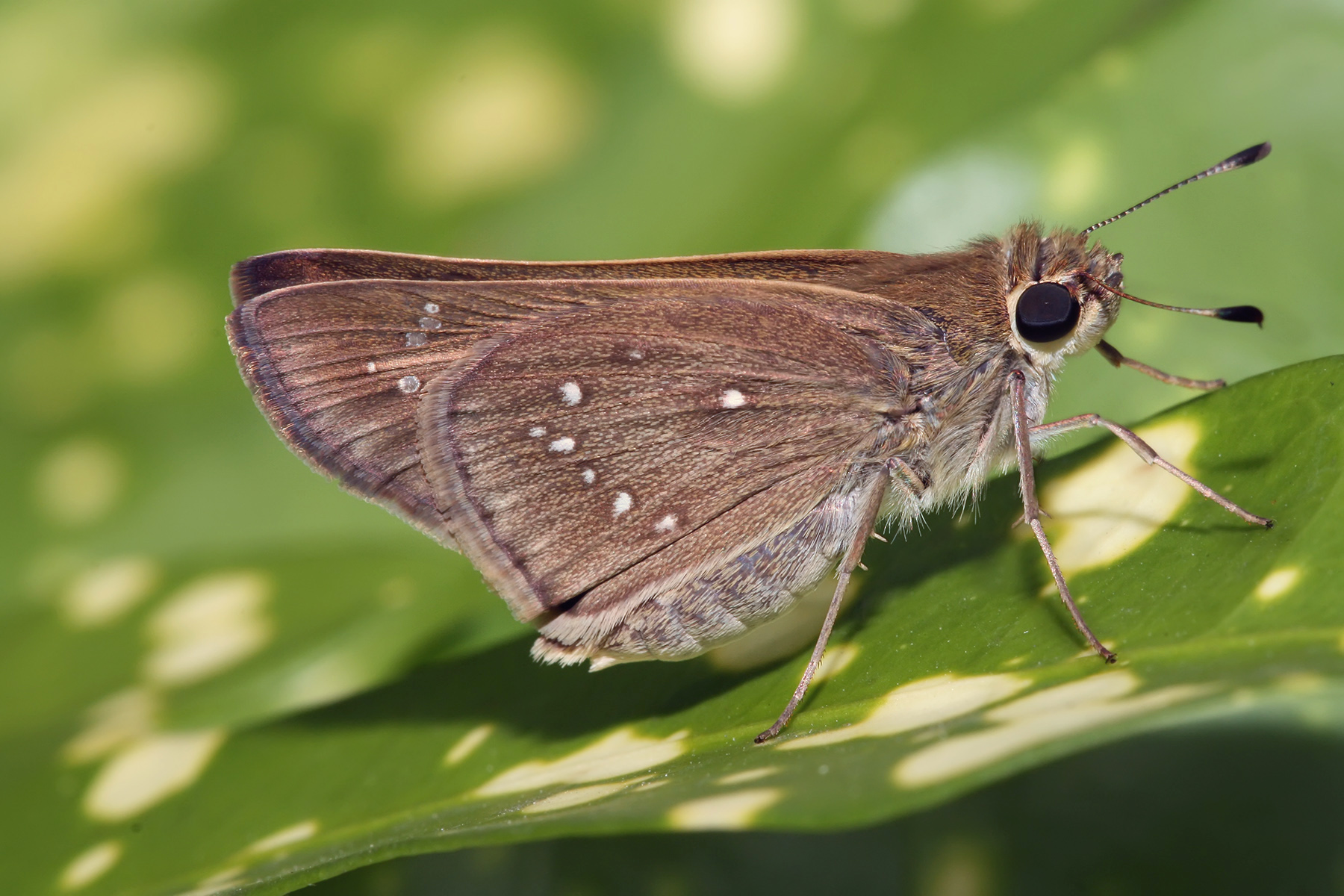
- Pelopidas sp.

Scientific classification
- Kingdom: Animalia
- Phylum: Arthropoda
- Class: Insecta
- Order: Lepidoptera
- Family: Hesperiidae
- Tribe: Baorini
- Genus: Pelopidas; Walker, 1870

Synonyms
- Chapra Moore, 1881

= Pelopidas (skipper) =

Branded swifts

Genus of butterflies

Pelopidas is a genus of skipper butterflies. They are commonly known as branded swifts or millet skippers. Polytremis kiraizana is sometimes placed here too. The genus was described by Francis Walker in 1870.

== Notable species ==
- Pelopidas agna (Moore, 1865) - dark branded swift
- Pelopidas assamensis (de Nicéville, 1882) - great swift
- Pelopidas conjucta (Herrich-Schäffer, 1869) - conjoined swift
- Pelopidas flava (Evans, 1926)
- Pelopidas jansonis (Butler, 1878)
- Pelopidas lyelli (Rothschild, 1915)
- Pelopidas mathias (Fabricius, 1798) - dark small-branded swift
- Pelopidas sinensis (Mabille, 1877)
- Pelopidas subochracea (Moore, 1878) - large branded swift
- Pelopidas thrax (Hübner, 1821) - pale small-branded swift
