= The Gables, Muswell Hill =

Block of flats in London

Coordinates: 51°35′27″N 0°09′01″W

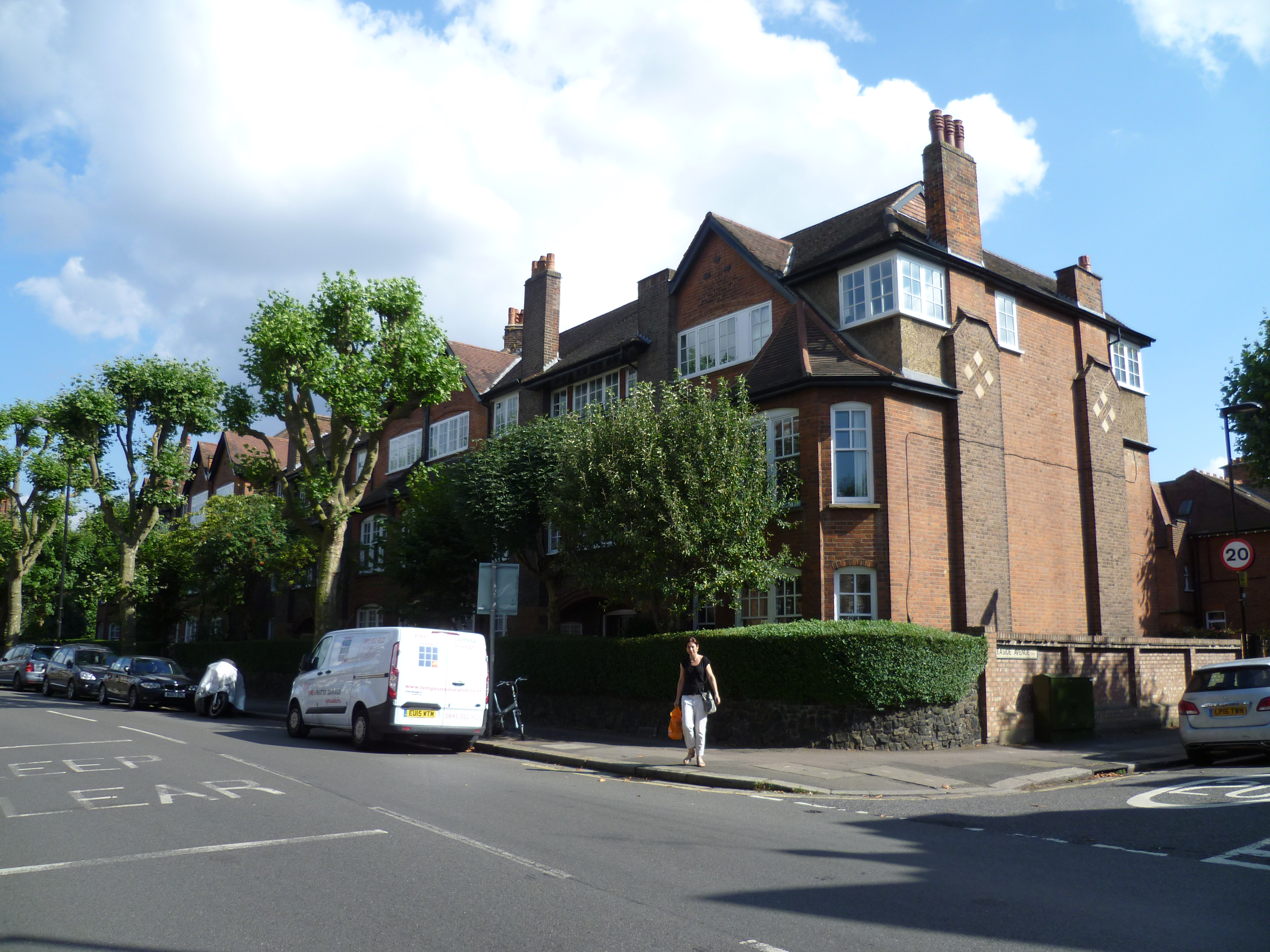
The Gables

The Gables is a block of flats in Fortis Green, on the edge of Muswell Hill, London, and a grade II listed building with Historic England. The building was constructed in 1907 to a design by Herbert and William Collins in the Arts and Crafts and Jugendstil style.

== Gallery ==
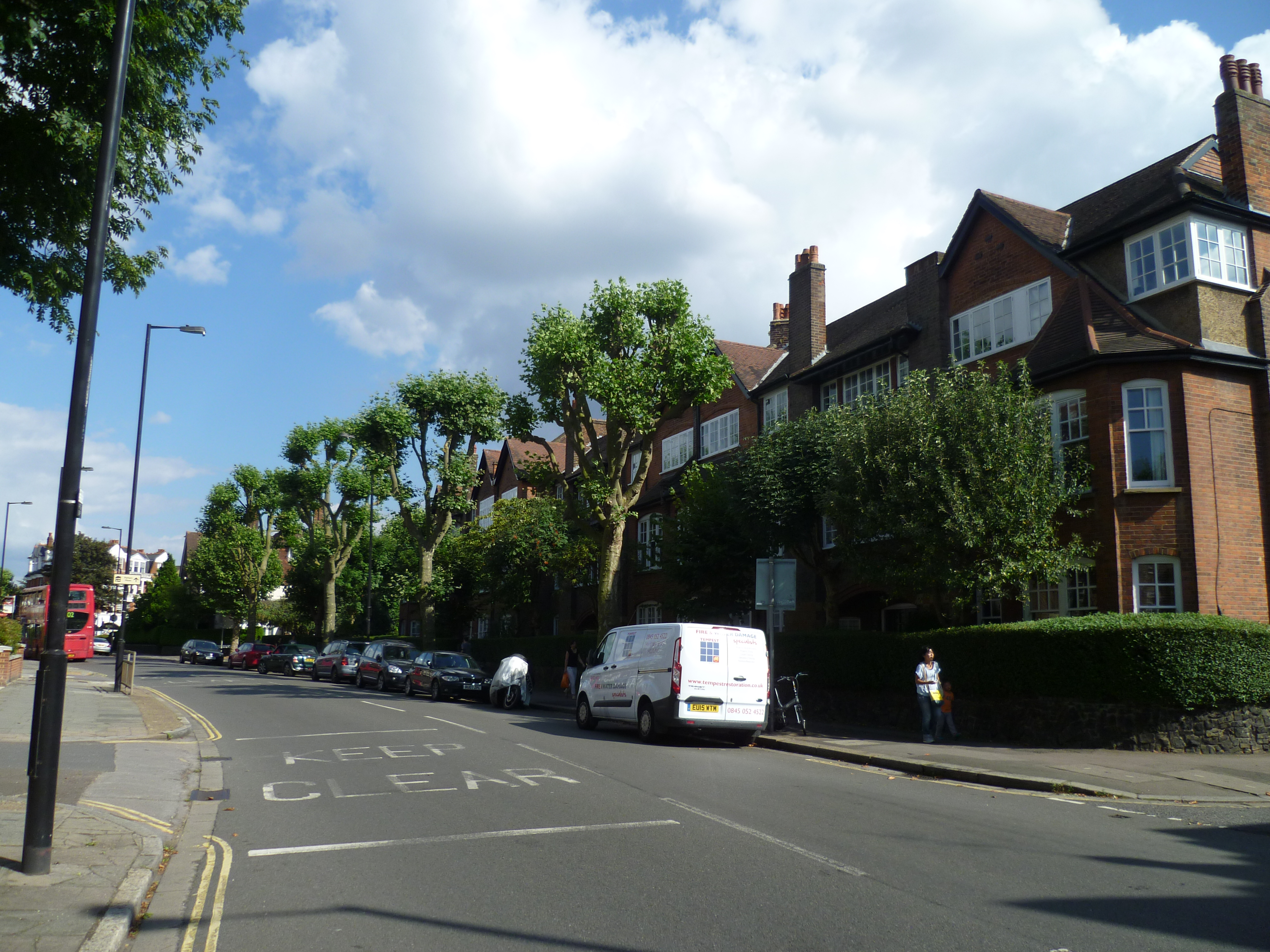
Front in Fortis Green Road

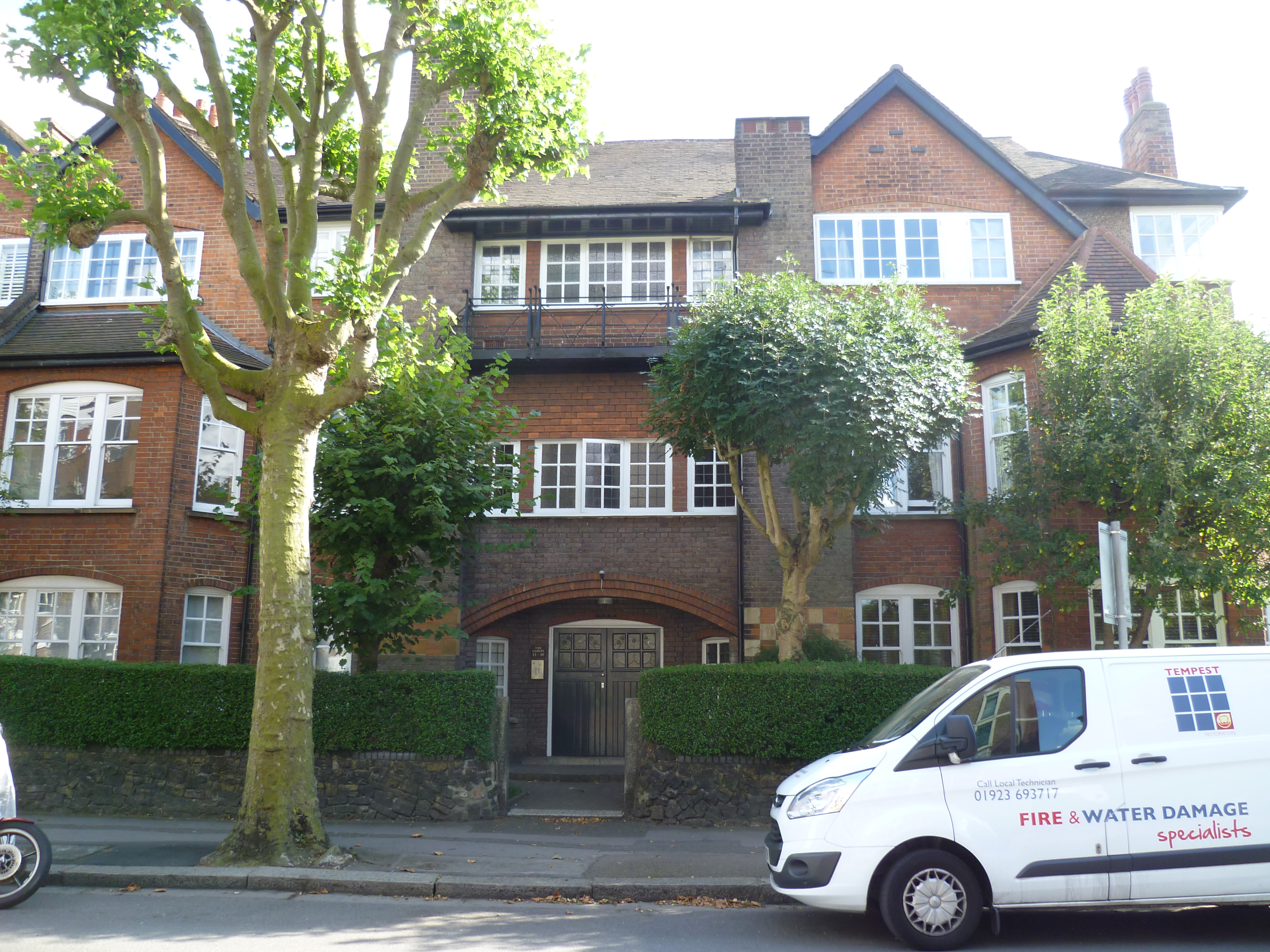
Front elevation

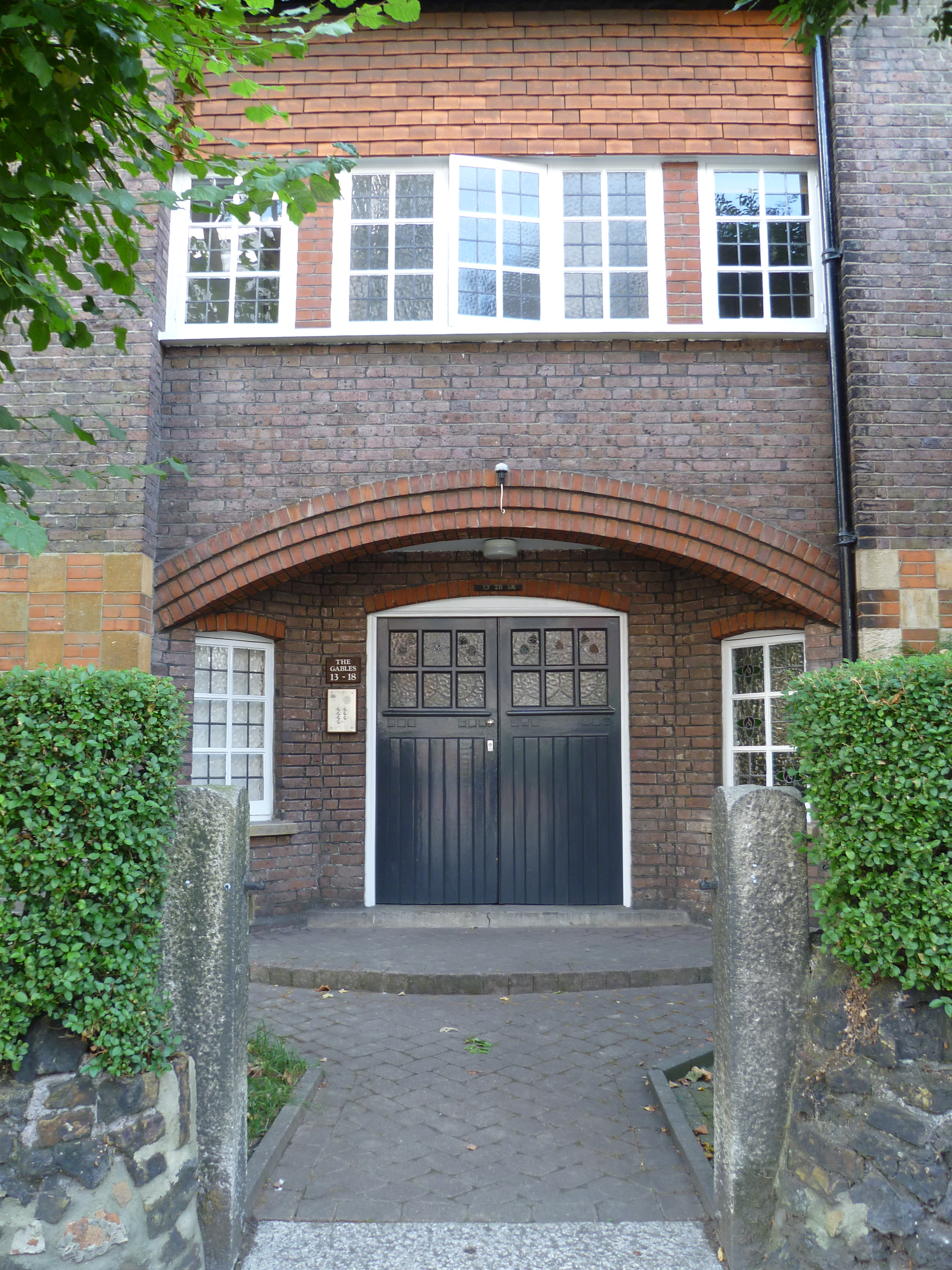
Entrance detail

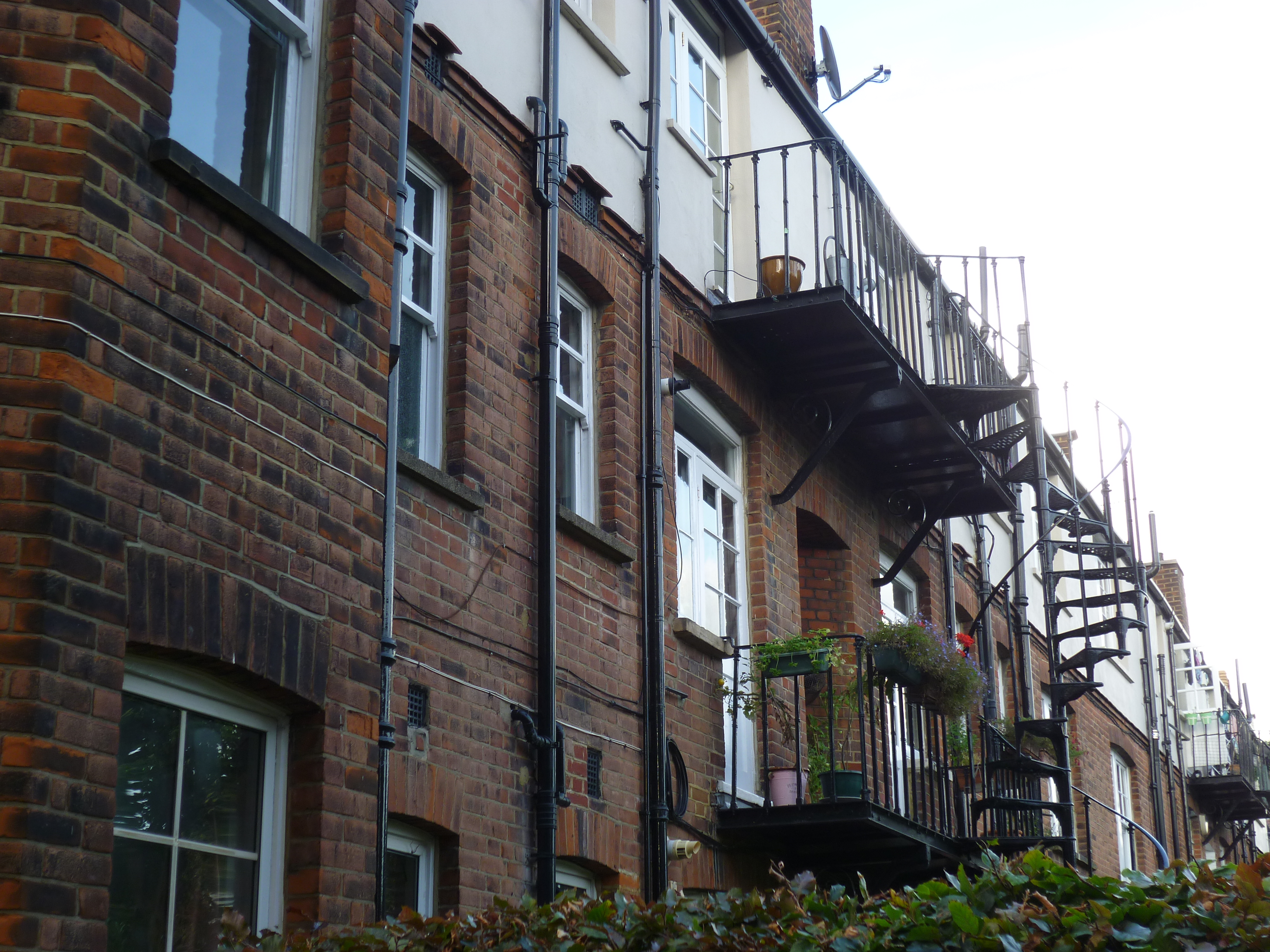
Rear

== See also ==
- Birchwood Mansions
