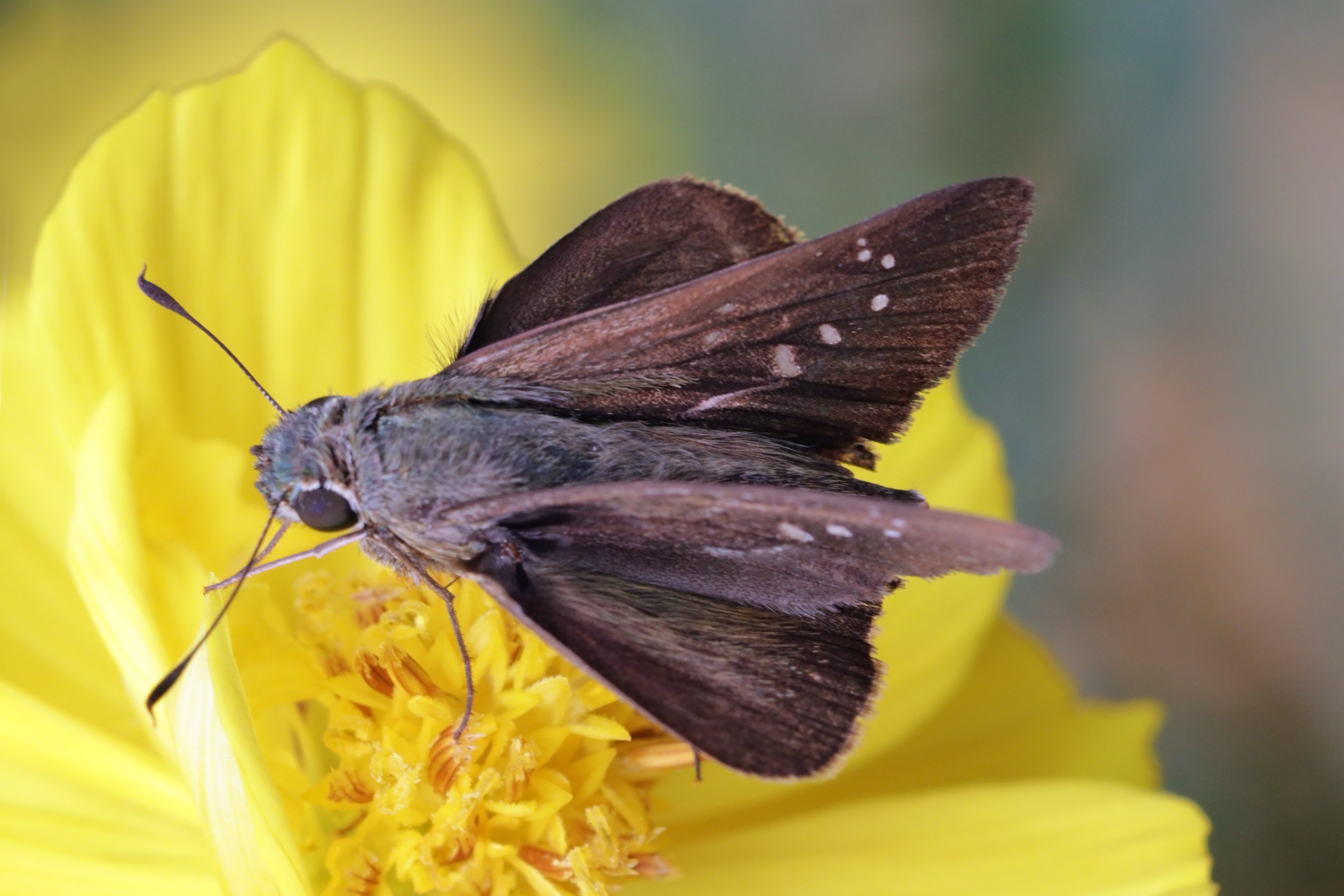
- in Nepal
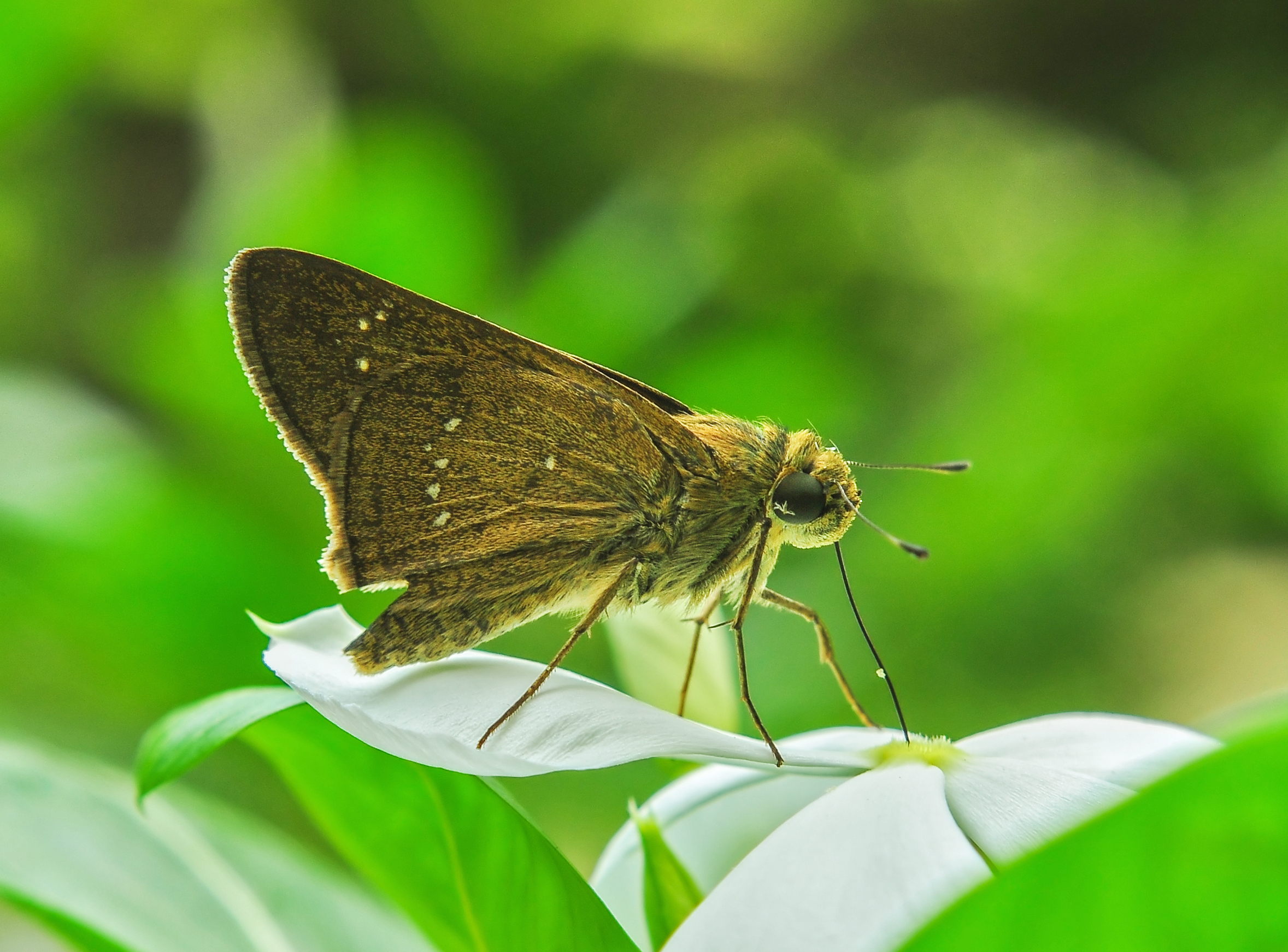
- in West Bengal, India

Scientific classification
- Domain: Eukaryota
- Kingdom: Animalia
- Phylum: Arthropoda
- Class: Insecta
- Order: Lepidoptera
- Family: Hesperiidae
- Genus: Pelopidas
- Species: P. agna

Binomial name
- Pelopidas agna (Moore, 1865)

Synonyms
- Hesperia agna Moore, 1866; Pamphila similis Moore, 1881; Chapra mathias niasica Fruhstorfer, 1911; Pelopidas dingo Evans, 1949; Chapra agna; Moore, 1881

= Pelopidas agna =

Species of butterfly

Pelopidas agna, the obscure branded swift or dark branded swift, is a butterfly belonging to the family Hesperiidae found in India.

== Description ==
In 1891, Edward Yerbury Watson wrote:

Upperside glossy olive-brown; forewing with a series of six very small rather indistinct whitish semi-transparent spots curving from before the apex to the middle of the wing; beneath these is a short oblique pale impressed streak, which is suffused with black on its anterior margin. Cilia pale brown. Underside pale brown; spots on forewing as above but less defined; hindwing with a curved discal series of white dots and a single dot near the base. Palpi and body beneath pale brownish-yellow.The spots are much less prominent in the dry season form than wet season form.

— E. Y. Watson
