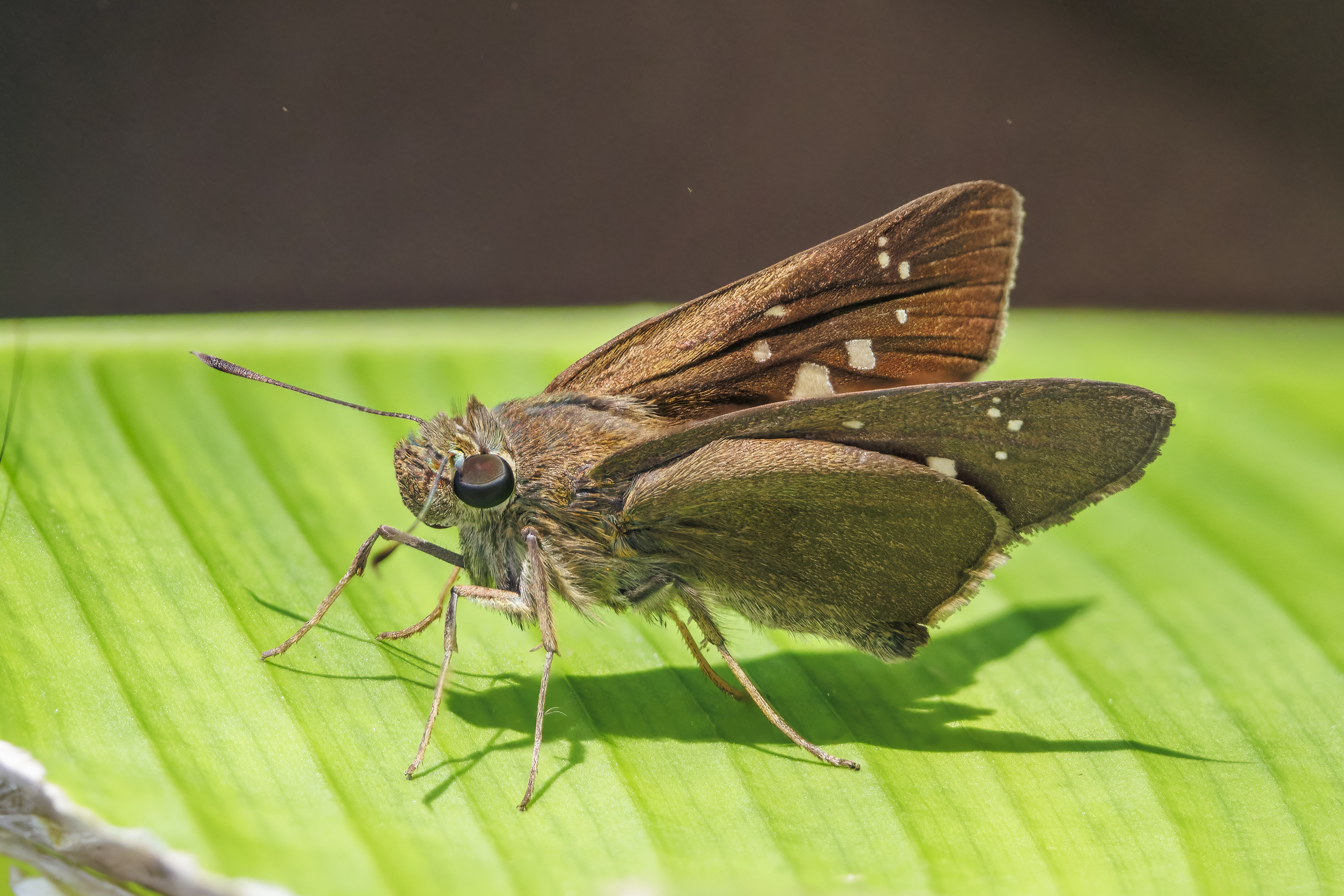
- Luang Prabang, Laos
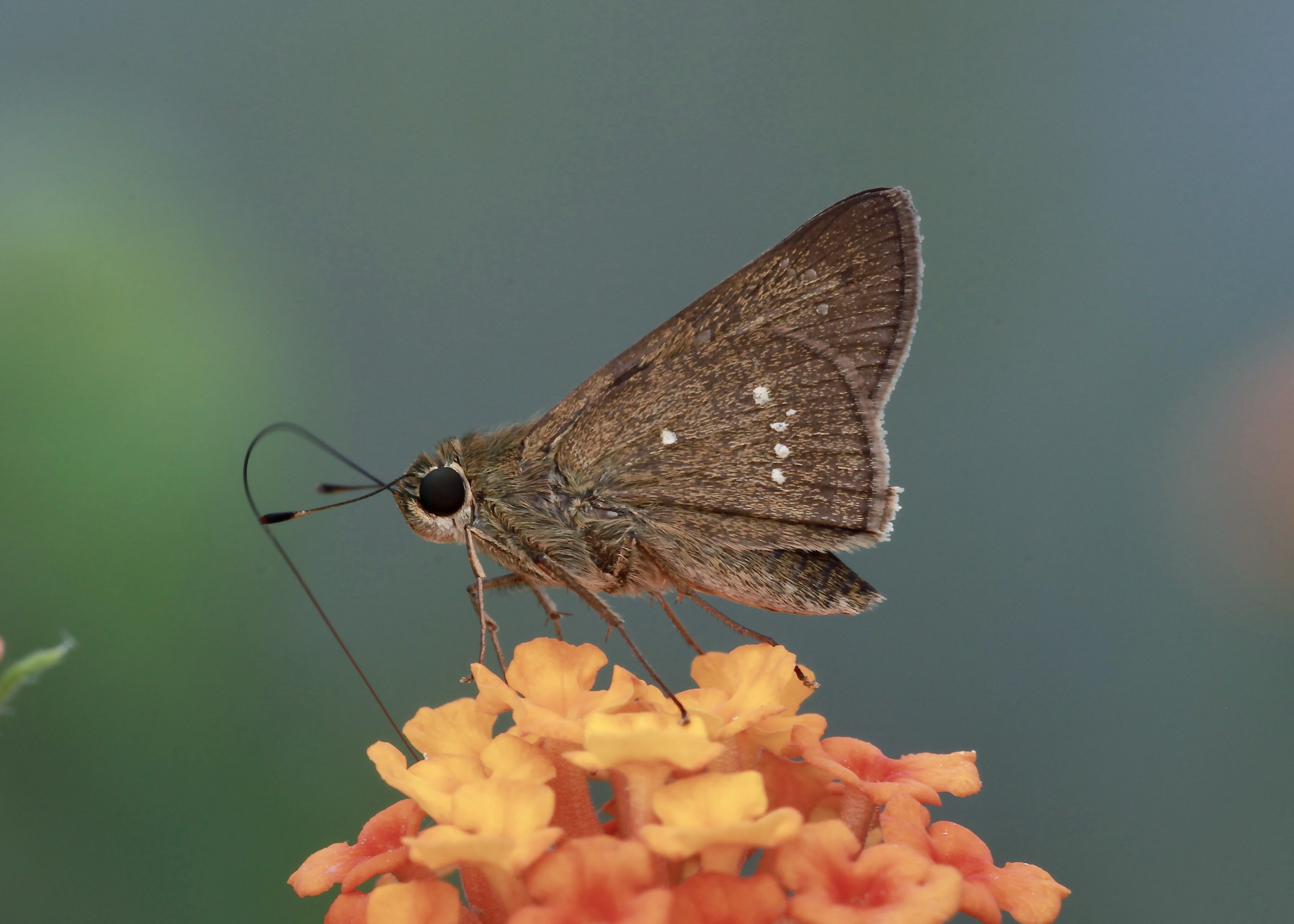
- Nanakmatta, Uttarakhand, India

Scientific classification
- Kingdom: Animalia
- Phylum: Arthropoda
- Clade: Pancrustacea
- Class: Insecta
- Order: Lepidoptera
- Family: Hesperiidae
- Genus: Pelopidas
- Species: P. mathias

Binomial name
- Pelopidas mathias (Fabricius, 1798)

Synonyms
- Hesperia mathias Fabricius, 1798; Baoris mathias; Parnara parvimacula Rothschild, 1915; Gegenes elegans Mabille, 1877; Pamphila umbrata Butler, 1879; Hesperia octofenestrata Saalmüller, 1884; Pamphila albirostris Mabille 1887 in Grandidier, [1885-7]; Hesperia chaya Moore, [1866]; Hesperia julianus Latreille, [1824]; Pamphila repetita Butler, 1882

= Pelopidas mathias =

Species of butterfly

Pelopidas mathias, the dark small-branded swift, small branded swift, lesser millet skipper or black branded swift, is a butterfly belonging to the family Hesperiidae. It is found throughout much of south, southeast and East Asia, and as far as the Philippines. It is also present in tropical Africa and Arabia.

== Description ==
In 1891, Edward Yerbury Watson described it as:

Male. Upperside olive brown: forewing with two small yellowish semi-transparent spots within end of cell, three before the apex, and in the male three oblique discal spots followed by a dark-bordered slender straight impressed glandular streak: hindwing with one or two very indistinct pale discal spots. Female with five discal spots in the forewing, and four or five in the hindwing. Underside paler; markings more distinct; hindwing also with a spot at upper end of the cell. Expanse 1.6 inch. (Moore)

Pelopidas mathias in Japan

== Role in agriculture ==
P. mathias is considered a pest to rice-growing cultures, although it is not as damaging to rice plants as Parnara guttata. Newly hatched caterpillars are especially voracious in eating young seedlings. They also use silken threads to roll up and stitch together partially eaten leaves for more efficient consumption.

== Subspecies ==
- Pelopidas mathias mathias
- Pelopidas mathias oberthueri Evans, 1937
- Pelopidas mathias repetita (Butler, 1882) (Admiralty Island, Dampier Island, Vulcan Island)

Torben Larsen developed a species numbering system for his 2005 publication Butterflies of West Africa. The nominate subspecies is #1444. The 'Larsen' numbers have since been used with permission in A Sharp Eye on Butterflies of Ghana.
