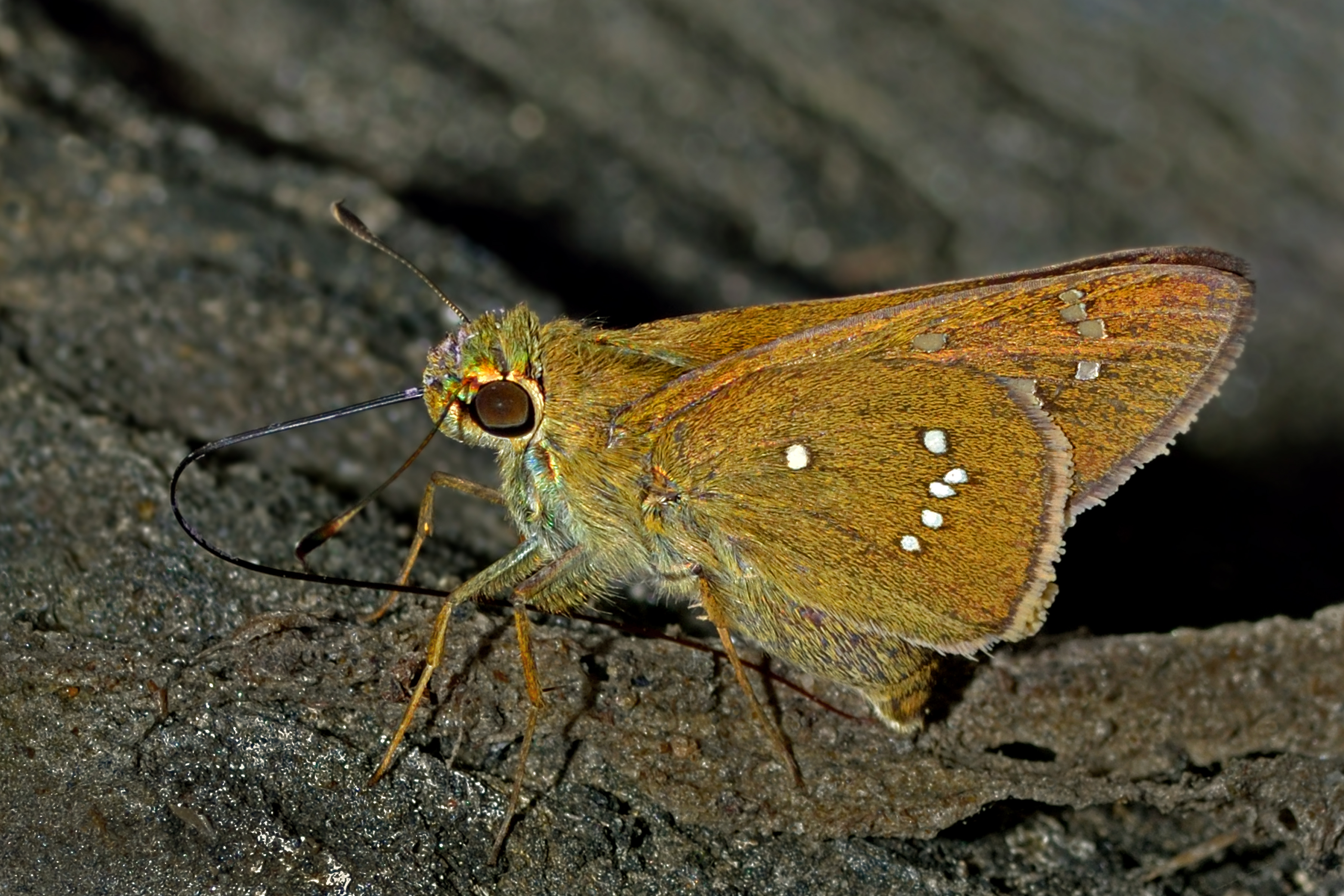

Scientific classification
- Kingdom: Animalia
- Phylum: Arthropoda
- Class: Insecta
- Order: Lepidoptera
- Family: Hesperiidae
- Genus: Pelopidas
- Species: P. assamensis

Binomial name
- Pelopidas assamensis (de Nicéville, 1882)

= Pelopidas assamensis =

Great swift

Species of butterfly

Pelopidas assamensis, the great swift, is a butterfly belonging to the family Hesperiidae. It was found in the Mandai area of Singapore. The caterpillar was discovered in the Bukit Timah Nature Reserve feeding on a bamboo plant.
