= Oliver Erichson Janson =

English entomologist (1850–1925)

Oliver Erichson Janson (1850 – 25 November 1925) was an English entomologist who specialised in beetles.

He was born in 1850, the son of Edward Wesley Janson. Janson's early years were spent at Fortis Green, and he collected beetles there and at Finchley, Hampstead and Highgate. In 1906, he made an expedition to Iceland adding to the collections of the National Museum of Iceland. During World War I, he made three trips to Ireland, particularly County Kerry. Janson was a world authority on Cetoniinae publishing new genera and species mostly in Cistula Entomologica published by Janson and Co. His world collection was purchased by Titus Valck Lucassen. His collection, in turn, was acquired by the Rijksmuseum van Natuurlijke Historie at Leiden in 1940.

He was a Fellow of the Royal Entomological Society from 1869 until his death.

== Works ==
Partial list

Coleoptera

- Descriptions of three new species of American Cetoniidae. Cistula Entomologica. 1:373-376 (1875).
- Notices of new or little known Cetoniidae. Cistula Entomologica. 2:133-140 (1876).
- Descriptions of new American Cetoniidae, Part 2. Cistula Entomologica. 2:581-585 (1881).
- Notices of new or little known Cetoniidae. Cistula Entomologica. 3:139-152 (1885).
- On the male sex of Argyripa subfasciata Rits., and description of a new species of the cetoniid genus Allorhina. Not. Leyden Mus. 10:118-120(1886).

Lepidoptera

- Notes on Japanese Rhopalocera with the description of new species Cistula ent. 2 : 153-160 (1877)
- Descriptions of two new eastern Species of the genus Papilio Cistula ent. 2 (21) : 433-434, pl. 8 (1879)
