= Andrew Janson =

South African rugby union player

- Born: 29 May 1935 Philippi, South Africa
- Died: 17 January 2007 (aged 71)

Rugby union career
- Position: Forward
Provincial / State sides
Years	Team	Apps	(Points)
1960–70	Western Province	42	
International career
Years	Team	Apps	(Points)
1965	South Africa		

Andrew Janson (29 May 1935 – 17 January 2007) was a South African international rugby union player.

Raised in Cape Town, Janson was a police officer by profession and competed in top level rugby through the 1960s, making 42 appearances for Western Province. He represented the Springboks on their 1965 tour Australia and New Zealand, where he participated in 11 non international fixtures, as a flanker or lock. His eight tries during the tour included a double against Wairarapa/Bush at Masterton.

Janson died of heart failure in 2007, at the age of 71.

== See also ==
- List of South Africa national rugby union players
