= Jamie Janson =

British aid worker (1975–2019)

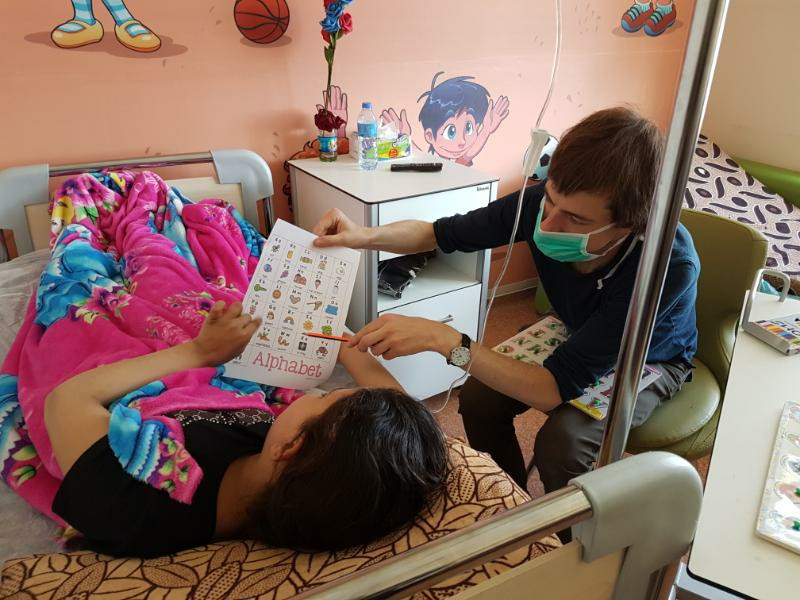
- Janson in Erbil
- Born: James Charles Harold Janson; 6 September 1975; Paddington, Greater London
- Died: 4 September 2019 (aged 43); London
- Education: Eton College
- Known for: Fighting alongside the YPG
- Relatives: Elizabeth Sutherland, 24th Countess of Sutherland (grandmother); Harold Balfour, 1st Baron Balfour of Inchrye (grandfather)

James Charles Harold Janson (6 September 1975 – 4 September 2019) was a British aid worker who joined the People's Protection Units (YPG) in May 2017 and fought against the Islamic State of Iraq and the Levant in Raqqa and the Turkish Armed Forces/Syrian National Army in Afrin.

== Biography ==
Janson was born in Paddington, the son of Martin Janson and his wife Mary Balfour, a daughter of Harold Balfour, 1st Baron Balfour of Inchrye by his marriage to a sister of the disgraced Conservative politician John Profumo. On his father's side, Janson was a grandson of Elizabeth Sutherland, 24th Countess of Sutherland. Educated at Eton College, he worked as a volunteer in refugee camps all over Europe and the Middle East, including the Calais Jungle, where he taught English. Janson wrote a number of articles about his experiences working with refugees.

He also spent some years as a film maker, producing videos for activist organisations, including the Green Party, Object, and NO2ID. He wrote and directed a number of short films and a pilot episode of a comedy series called 'Be Well', based in a therapy clinic.

Janson joined the YPG after spending time working in Mosul, distributing medical aid and clean water. What he saw there moved him to take the next step and travel to Syria to join the Kurds to defend Rojava against ISIS. He fought in the liberation of Raqqa, then in January 2017, when Turkey invaded the Kurdish town of Afrin, just over the Syrian border, Janson decided to stay with the YPG to fight this new threat, despite knowing that fighting a NATO ally could cause problems if he wanted to return to Europe.

Janson appeared in YPG propaganda videos, including one condemning what he perceived as Western inaction during the Turkish-led Afrin offensive of 2018. He was interviewed for several print articles and by the BBC. Interviews with him also feature in the BBC documentary "Anna, the woman who went to fight ISIS", about the British YPJ fighter, Anna Campbell who died in the Afrin assault.

Upon his return to Britain in 2018, Janson was arrested in Kent under section 5 of the Terrorism Act. He was still under investigation at the time of his death sixteen months later, although no former YPG volunteers have been successfully prosecuted by the British government.

Janson died on 4 September 2019, taking his own life after a long struggle with mental illness. He was buried in the grounds of Dunrobin Castle, Golspie, Scotland, the seat of the Earls of Sutherland.
