= Fortis Green =

Coordinates: 51.590°N 0.162°W

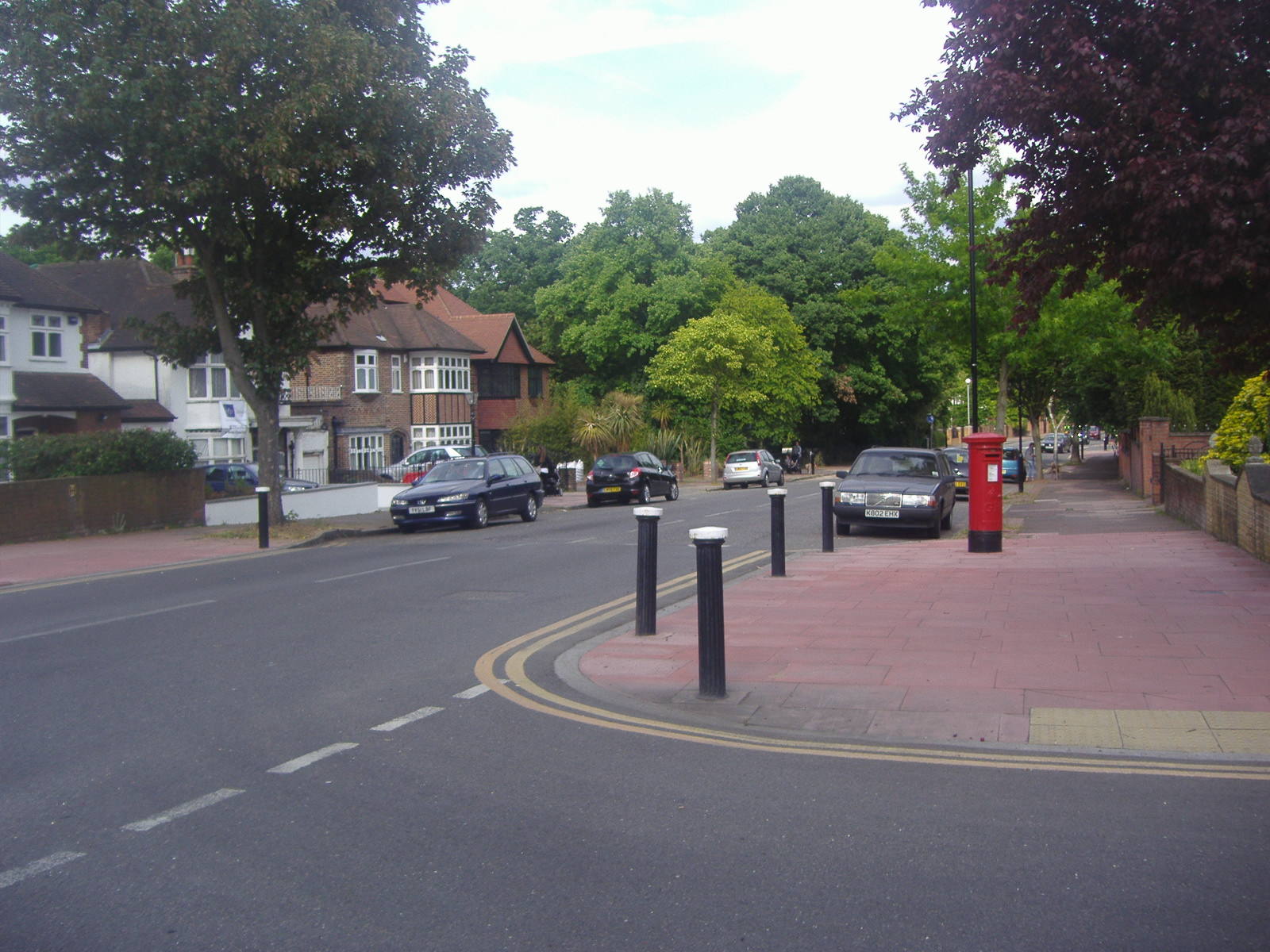
- Church Vale corner looking along Creighton Avenue

- Location within Greater London
- Population: 12,488 (2011 Census. Ward)
- London borough: Haringey
- Ceremonial county: Greater London
- Region: London
- Country: England
- Sovereign state: United Kingdom
- Post town: LONDON
- Postcode district: N2, N6, N10
- Dialling code: 020
- Police: Metropolitan
- Fire: London
- Ambulance: London
- UK Parliament: Hornsey and Friern Barnet
- London Assembly: Enfield and Haringey

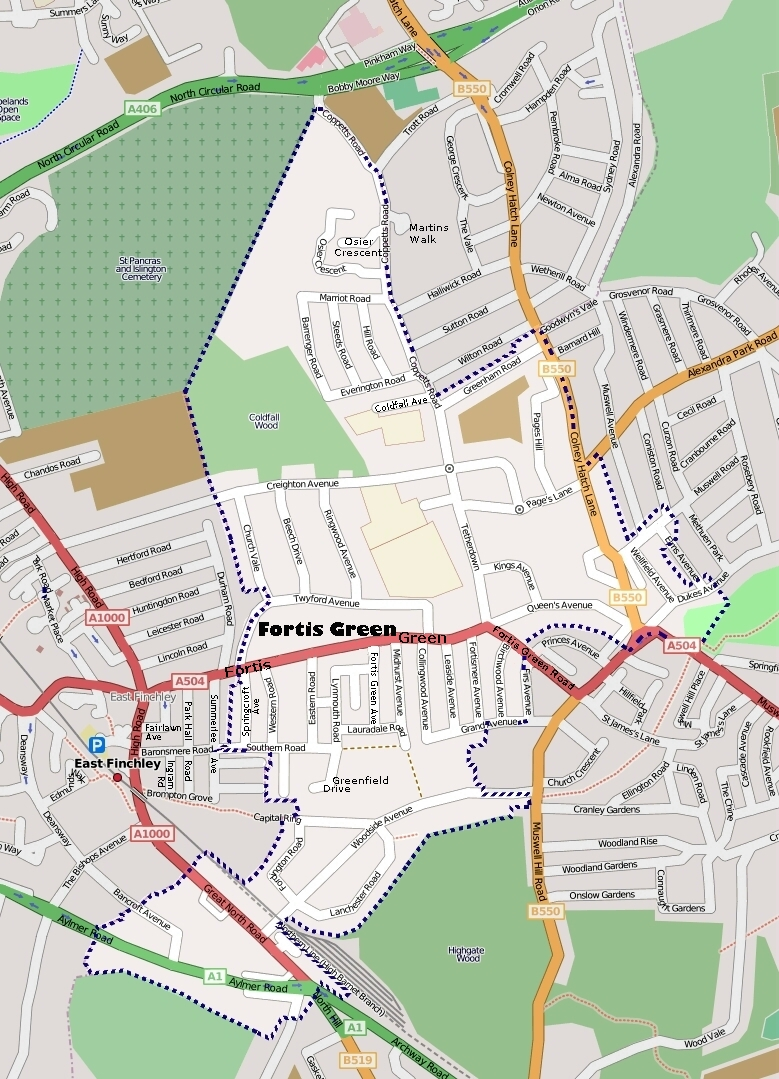
A map showing Fortis Green ward boundaries from 2002 to 2022

Fortis Green is a locality in the extreme northwestern corner of the Borough of Haringey, north London. It is also the name of the road that runs between Muswell Hill and East Finchley which forms part of the A504.

It lies between Colney Hatch to the north, Muswell Hill to the east, Highgate to the south and East Finchley to the west. It is a mostly residential area, although it also once contained two large hospitals: Coppets Wood Hospital to the north, which was the Infectious and Tropical Diseases Unit of the Royal Free Hospital NHS Trust, and St Lukes Woodside Hospital to the south. Both of these hospitals are now closed.

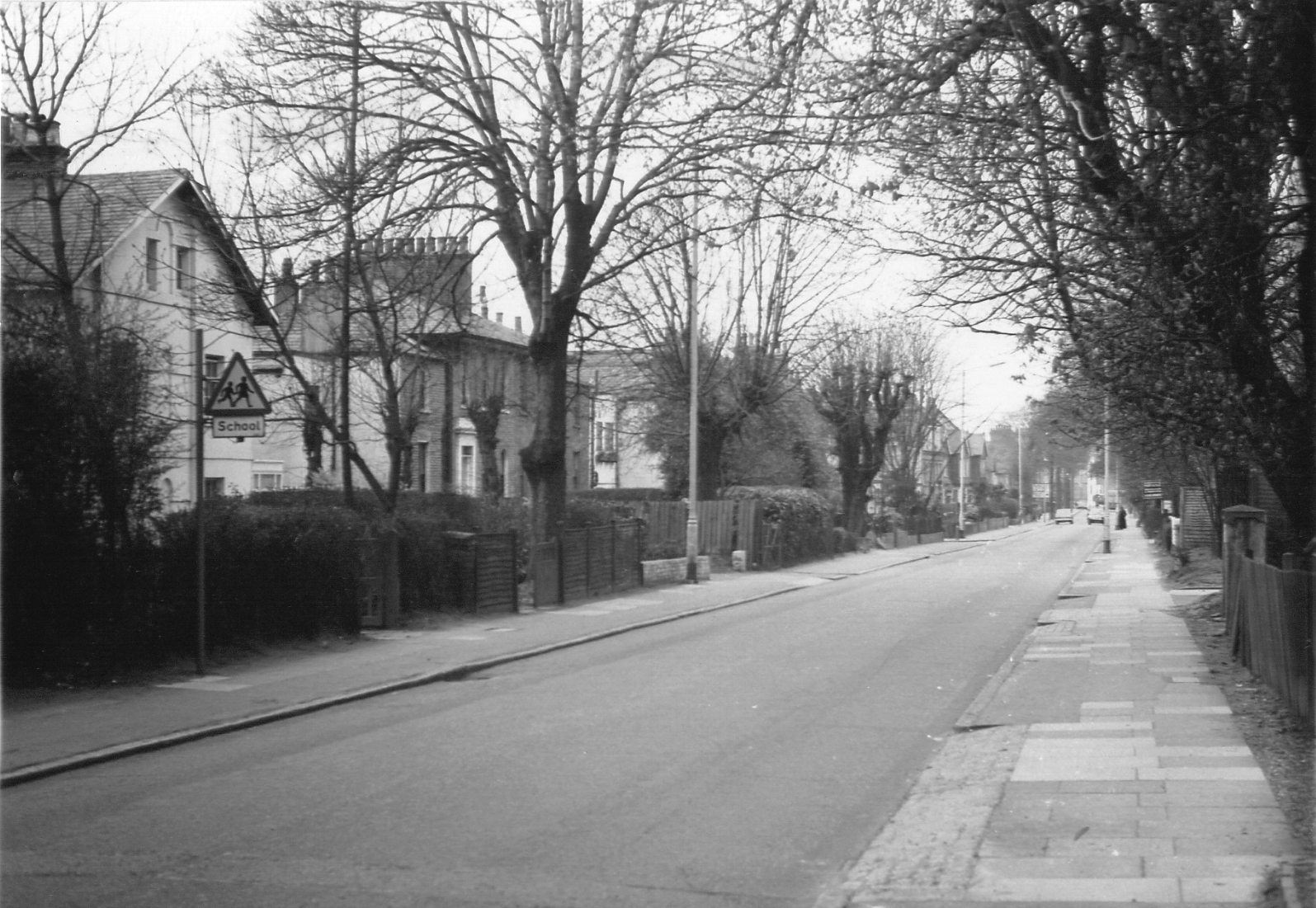
Fortis Green in 1973, looking west towards East Finchley

Fortis Green ward has a population of about 12,000 and is generally a middle-class area, with a higher proportion of skilled and highly qualified employees than the borough average (40.7% as compared with 26.3% are in social grade AB). More than half of the 16- to 74-year-olds in Fortis Green are qualified to degree level or higher, and employment levels are very high. About 85% of the population is White, higher than the borough average of about 65%. Of housing stock, 47.2% is in houses and 52.8% is in flats.

Fortis Green Road and Muswell Hill Broadway are the main shopping thoroughfares and the parish church is dedicated to St James. The nearest tube stations are at East Finchley and Highgate.

== History ==
Although Fortis Green is now seen as being an integral part of Greater London this is quite a recent development. Before the 19th century the area was completely rural with an expanse of common land to the north and farmland to the south. In 1816 only Coldfall Wood and wasteland lay north of Fortis Green and west of Coppetts Road. Several houses stood near the junction of Fortis Green with Muswell Hill Road where these scattered dwellings included the parish poorhouses and Upton Farm.

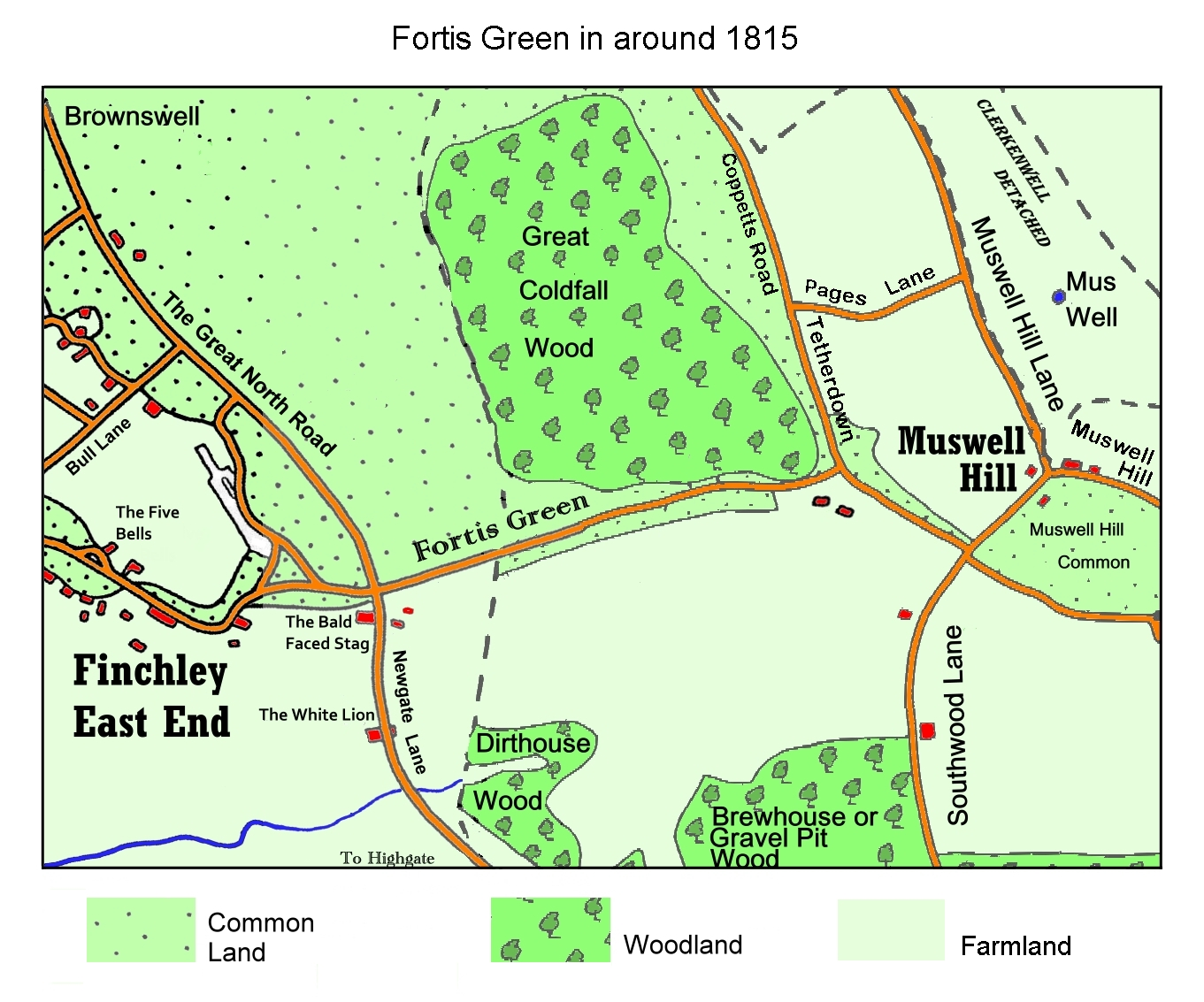
Fortis Green in 1815 showing the rural nature of the area at the time

Development of Fortis Green from a countryside track began with the enclosure of the commons it crossed. The area of Hornsey Common fronting the track was divided into narrow plots in 1815. Building started soon after with the semi-detached villas Albion Lodge and Albion Cottage being one of the first properties to be built around this time. These are one of the earliest surviving properties in the area, outside Highgate.

Development of the East Finchley end began in 1820 when the Bishop of London sold off a large south-facing field on the south side of Fortis Green on the corner of the East Finchley High Road. Four grand houses were built on the plot and proceeding from west to east these properties were Fairlawn, Cranleigh, Park Hall and Summerlee. A further large house, Park View was also built to the east of Summerlee.

In 1835, the architect Anthony Salvin purchased a field and built two Italianate villas, Springcroft and Colethall (later Uplands) to the east of Summerlee. In the 1850s St James Church school was constructed on the north side of Fortis Green near to the junction with Tetherdown.

Fortis Green was affected by the construction of the Great Northern Railway stations at East Finchley, which opened in 1867, and Muswell Hill in 1872 and also by the opening of Alexandra Park in 1872. Twenty houses were built in the decade to 1861, most of them on the Haswell Park estate to the south of the road which was acquired in 1852 by the National Freehold Land Society. Meant for superior villas, it was divided into 180 plots facing Eastern, Western, and Southern roads and the paths later called Haswell Passage, Francis Road, and Shakespeare Gardens. Some roads existed by 1855 and in 1856 it was claimed that all lots were fenced and connected to main services.

In spite of auctions in 1852 and 1856 some lots were still unsold in 1858; there were only 28 houses in 1871. Vacant plots remained in 1896, and the southern part of the estate was never built on. In 1871, there were only twelve houses, six built during 1867–68, standing north of Fortis Green and in 1896 there were just two large houses between Eastern Road and Muswell Hill Road.

During the 1890s, with the expansion of London, building spread to Fortis Green. By 1900 builders had laid out the curved Creighton Avenue from Page's Lane to Coldfall Wood.

By 1900, the builder W. J. Collins had laid out the area south of Fortis Green and west of Muswell Hill Road, previously the site of the large houses Midhurst, Fortismere, and the Firs, which by 1908 had been replaced by six streets (Firs, Birchwood, Fortismere, Leaside, Collingwood and Midhurst) of terraced houses running southward from Fortis Green to Grand Avenue.

In 1902, the Police Station was opened. The Clissold Arms is on the site of the Fortis Green Brewery which operated from 1843 to 1902. Until 1888, the Green family operated the brewery, then for some years it was run by a Mr. Norman until being taken over by Ind Coope.

South of Fortis Green Road, on opposite sides of Firs Avenue, the flats Firs Mansions and Birchwood Mansions were erected about 1907 and 1910 respectively. South of Fortis Green itself, Midhurst Mansions dates from 1902 while Leaside Mansions and The Gables date from about 1907.

By 1908, Burlington Road and the western frontage of Tetherdown had been built. Further west, in the same year, building was in progress in Lynmouth Road, Southern Road and Springcroft Avenue.

After 1920, the only remaining development that could be done was at the expense of the remaining open spaces, along Creighton Avenue, to the west of Coppetts Road, and the roads connecting it to Fortis Green. Ringwood Avenue, Beech Drive, Church Vale and Twyford Avenue were built during the 1930s on the southern part of Coldfall Wood.

Woodside Avenue and the connecting roads, and Fordington and Lanchester roads were also built during this period.

== Notable residents ==
- Oliver Erichson Janson (1850–1925), entomologist
- William Bernhardt Tegetmeier (1816–1912), naturalist
- Ray Davies (born 1944), musician
- Dave Davies (born 1947), musician
- Simon Nicol (born 1950), musician
