= Edward Mason Janson =

British entomologist

Edward Mason Janson (1847 Hackney, London – 1880 Nicaragua) was a British entomologist who lived and worked in Nicaragua.

Janson was the oldest son of Edward Wesley Janson (1822–1891) and Emily Mason, who were married on 25 December 1846 at Highgate, London. Janson's father Edward Snr. worked as a railway clerk, later as an accountant, and became an entomologist in the early 1850s, with two of his sons Edward and Oliver following him into the pursuit.

Edward Mason Janson became a member of the Entomological Society of London in 1869, listed as living in Las Lajas, Chontales, Nicaragua. For his regular job Janson worked as a mining engineer. Coleoptera material Janson collected in Chontales was examined by Henry Walter Bates and David Sharp for Frederick Godman and Osbert Salvin's project Biologia Centrali-Americana.

Janson died at the age of 33 in Nicaragua, leaving a young family.

== Taxonomic names in honour of E.M. Janson ==
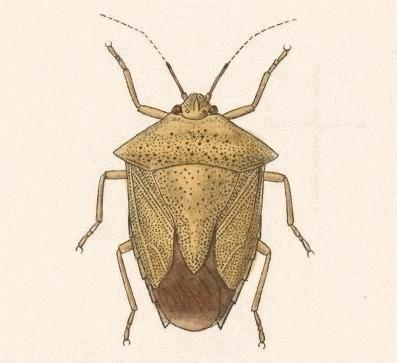
Figure of Edessa jansoni, described by William Lucas Distant in Biologia Centrali-Americana from a specimen collected by Edward Mason Janson

The Coreoidea species Mozena jansoni, originally described as 'Mictis (?) jansoni' by John Scott in 1882, was named in honour of Janson.

William Lucas Distant named the Pentatomidae species Edessa jansoni in 1881 from a specimen collected by Janson in Chontales.

The Staphylinidae species Gyrophaena jansoni was described by David Sharp from a single male example collected by Janson in Chontales.
