= Edward Wesley Janson =

English entomologist (1822–1891)

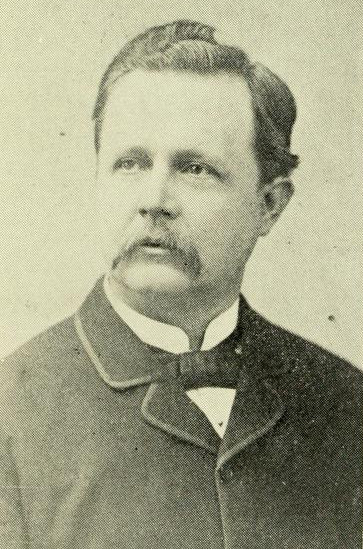
- Janson in 1863
- Born: 14 March 1822
- Died: 14 September 1891 (aged 69)

Edward Wesley Janson (14 March 1822 – 14 September 1891) was an English entomologist who specialised in beetles.

The Janson family was of Dutch origin and Edward Wesley Janson's father was the London Agent of the Dutch Rhenish Railway Company.

A keen entomologist, Janson was elected a Fellow of the Entomological Society of London in 1843. In 1850, he was appointed curator of the Society's collections, a post he held until 1863. He was then the Society's librarian until 1874.

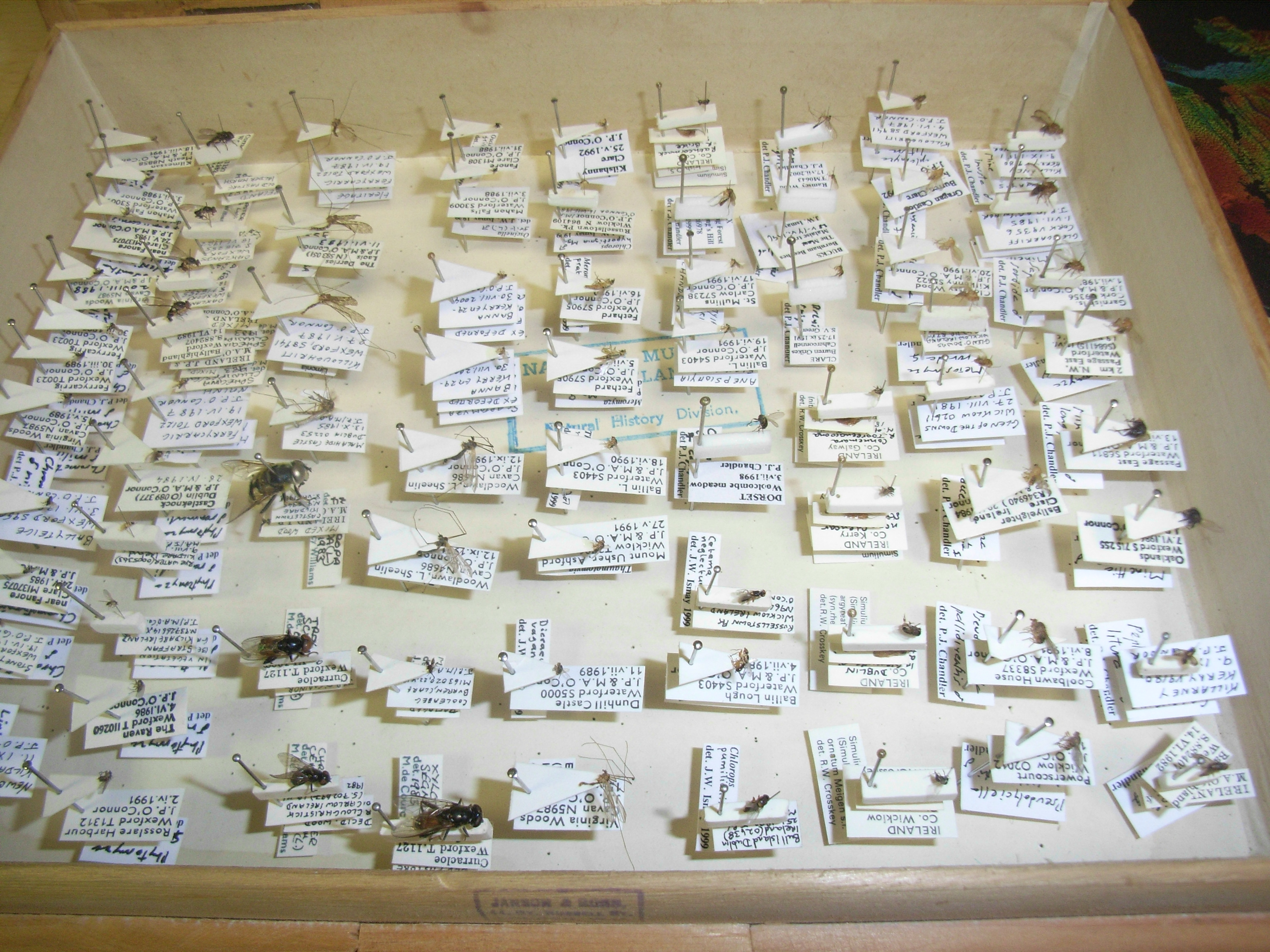
Insect Collection Diptera. Box supplied by the Janson's natural history company

In 1852, he started a natural history business, Janson & Sons, selling books and specimens. He also became a publisher, first initiating the Journal of Entomology (published by Taylor and Francis in 14 parts from 1862-1866), then Cistula Entomologica (29 parts, from 1869–1885). He also published a volume of British Beetles in 1863, with illustrations from John Curtis' British Entomology.

Janson also assembled a collection of world click beetles (Elateridae), consisting of 25,000 specimens of which 1000 were original types.

The Janson company archive is conserved in the Natural History Museum in London.

His eldest son Edward, was also an entomologist.
