= List of butterflies of Namibia =

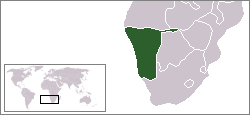
Location of Namibia

This is a list of butterflies of Namibia. About 224 species are known from Namibia, six of which are endemic.

== Papilionidae ==
=== Papilioninae ===
==== Papilionini ====
- Papilio nireus lyaeus Doubleday, 1845
- Papilio demodocus Esper, [1798]

==== Leptocercini ====
- Graphium antheus (Cramer, 1779)
- Graphium porthaon (Hewitson, 1865)
- Graphium angolanus (Goeze, 1779)
- Graphium schaffgotschi (Niepelt, 1927)

== Pieridae ==
=== Coliadinae ===
- Eurema brigitta (Stoll, [1780])
- Eurema hecabe solifera (Butler, 1875)
- Catopsilia florella (Fabricius, 1775)
- Colias electo (Linnaeus, 1763)

=== Pierinae ===
- Colotis amata williami Henning & Henning, 1994
- Colotis antevippe gavisa (Wallengren, 1857)
- Colotis celimene pholoe (Wallengren, 1860)
- Colotis danae annae (Wallengren, 1857)
- Colotis danae walkeri (Butler, 1884)
- Colotis doubledayi (Hopffer, 1862)
- Colotis euippe omphale (Godart, 1819)
- Colotis evagore antigone (Boisduval, 1836)
- Colotis evenina (Wallengren, 1857)
- Colotis ione (Godart, 1819)
- Colotis lais (Butler, 1876)
- Colotis pallene (Hopffer, 1855)
- Colotis regina (Trimen, 1863)
- Colotis vesta mutans (Butler, 1877)
- Colotis eris (Klug, 1829)
- Colotis subfasciatus (Swainson, 1833)
- Colotis agoye agoye (Wallengren, 1857)
- Colotis agoye bowkeri (Trimen, 1883)
- Eronia leda (Boisduval, 1847)
- Pinacopterix eriphia (Godart, [1819])
- Nepheronia buquetii (Boisduval, 1836)
- Nepheronia thalassina sinalata (Suffert, 1904)

==== Pierini ====
- Appias sylvia nyasana (Butler, 1897)
- Pontia helice (Linnaeus, 1764)
- Mylothris agathina (Cramer, 1779)
- Belenois aurota (Fabricius, 1793)
- Belenois creona severina (Stoll, 1781)
- Belenois gidica abyssinica (Lucas, 1852)

== Lycaenidae ==
=== Miletinae ===
==== Miletini ====
- Lachnocnema bibulus (Fabricius, 1793)
- Lachnocnema durbani Trimen & Bowker, 1887
- Thestor protumnus aridus van Son, 1941

=== Poritiinae ===
==== Liptenini ====
- Alaena amazoula congoana Aurivillius, 1914
- Alaena brainei Vári, 1976 (endemic)
- Cnodontes pallida (Trimen, 1898)

=== Aphnaeinae ===
- Chrysoritis chrysantas (Trimen, 1868)
- Trimenia macmasteri mijburghi Dickson, 1980
- Trimenia wykehami (Dickson, 1969)
- Cigaritis ella (Hewitson, 1865)
- Cigaritis homeyeri (Dewitz, 1887)
- Cigaritis modestus (Trimen, 1891)
- Cigaritis mozambica (Bertoloni, 1850)
- Cigaritis namaquus (Trimen, 1874)
- Cigaritis natalensis (Westwood, 1851)
- Cigaritis phanes (Trimen, 1873)
- Axiocerses tjoane (Wallengren, 1857)
- Axiocerses amanga amanga (Westwood, 1881)
- Axiocerses amanga baumi Weymer, 1901
- Aloeides aranda (Wallengren, 1857)
- Aloeides namibiensis Henning & Henning, 1994
- Aloeides damarensis (Trimen, 1891)
- Aloeides molomo krooni Tite & Dickson, 1973
- Aloeides taikosama (Wallengren, 1857)
- Aloeides simplex (Trimen, 1893)
- Aloeides tearei Henning & Henning, 1982
- Aloeides nollothi Tite & Dickson, 1977
- Aloeides argenteus Henning & Henning, 1994
- Aphnaeus erikssoni Trimen, 1891
- Tylopaedia sardonyx sardonyx (Trimen, 1868)
- Tylopaedia sardonyx cerita Henning & Henning, 1998
- Phasis clavum Murray, 1935

=== Theclinae ===
- Myrina silenus ficedula Trimen, 1879
- Myrina silenus suzannae Larsen & Plowes, 1991
- Hypolycaena philippus (Fabricius, 1793)
- Hemiolaus caeculus tsodiloensis (Pinhey, 1969)
- Leptomyrina henningi Dickson, 1976
- Leptomyrina lara (Linnaeus, 1764)
- Iolaus alienus sophiae Henning & Henning, 1991
- Iolaus mimosae pamelae (Dickson, 1976)
- Iolaus nasisii (Riley, 1928)
- Iolaus obscurus Aurivillius, 1923 (endemic)
- Iolaus silarus brainei Henning & Henning, 1984
- Stugeta bowkeri tearei Dickson, 1980
- Stugeta subinfuscata Grünberg, 1910
- Pilodeudorix obscurata (Trimen, 1891)
- Deudorix antalus (Hopffer, 1855)
- Deudorix dinochares Grose-Smith, 1887

=== Polyommatinae ===
==== Lycaenesthini ====
- Anthene amarah (Guérin-Méneville, 1849)
- Anthene contrastata mashuna (Stevenson, 1937)
- Anthene otacilia (Trimen, 1868)

==== Polyommatini ====
- Cupidopsis cissus (Godart, [1824])
- Cupidopsis jobates (Hopffer, 1855)
- Pseudonacaduba sichela (Wallengren, 1857)
- Lampides boeticus (Linnaeus, 1767)
- Cacyreus dicksoni Pennington, 1962
- Cacyreus lingeus (Stoll, 1782)
- Leptotes pirithous (Linnaeus, 1767)
- Leptotes pulchra (Murray, 1874)
- Tuxentius calice (Hopffer, 1855)
- Tuxentius melaena (Trimen & Bowker, 1887)
- Tarucus sybaris linearis (Aurivillius, 1924)
- Zintha hintza krooni (Dickson, 1973)
- Zizeeria knysna (Trimen, 1862)
- Actizera lucida (Trimen, 1883)
- Zizula hylax (Fabricius, 1775)
- Brephidium metophis (Wallengren, 1860)
- Azanus jesous (Guérin-Méneville, 1849)
- Azanus ubaldus (Stoll, 1782)
- Eicochrysops hippocrates (Fabricius, 1793)
- Eicochrysops messapus mahallakoaena (Wallengren, 1857)
- Euchrysops barkeri (Trimen, 1893)
- Euchrysops dolorosa (Trimen & Bowker, 1887)
- Euchrysops malathana (Boisduval, 1833)
- Euchrysops osiris (Hopffer, 1855)
- Euchrysops subpallida Bethune-Baker, 1923
- Freyeria trochylus (Freyer, [1843])
- Lepidochrysops michellae Henning & Henning, 1983 (endemic)
- Lepidochrysops patricia (Trimen & Bowker, 1887)
- Lepidochrysops plebeia (Butler, 1898)
- Lepidochrysops vansoni (Swanepoel, 1949)

== Nymphalidae ==
=== Danainae ===
==== Danaini ====
- Danaus chrysippus orientis (Aurivillius, 1909)
- Tirumala petiverana (Doubleday, 1847)
- Amauris niavius (Linnaeus, 1758)
- Amauris tartarea Mabille, 1876

=== Satyrinae ===
==== Melanitini ====
- Melanitis leda (Linnaeus, 1758)

==== Satyrini ====
- Heteropsis perspicua (Trimen, 1873)
- Heteropsis simonsii (Butler, 1877)
- Ypthima asterope asterope (Klug, 1832)
- Ypthima asterope hereroica van Son, 1955
- Coenyropsis natalii (Boisduval, 1847)
- Physcaeneura panda (Boisduval, 1847)
- Stygionympha robertsoni (Riley, 1932)
- Stygionympha irrorata (Trimen, 1873)

=== Charaxinae ===
==== Charaxini ====
- Charaxes varanes vologeses (Mabille, 1876)
- Charaxes candiope (Godart, 1824)
- Charaxes jasius saturnus Butler, 1866
- Charaxes brutus natalensis Staudinger, 1885
- Charaxes bohemani Felder & Felder, 1859
- Charaxes achaemenes Felder & Felder, 1867
- Charaxes brainei van Son, 1966
- Charaxes guderiana (Dewitz, 1879)
- Charaxes zoolina (Westwood, [1850])

=== Nymphalinae ===
==== Nymphalini ====
- Vanessa cardui (Linnaeus, 1758)
- Junonia hierta cebrene Trimen, 1870
- Junonia natalica (Felder & Felder, 1860)
- Junonia oenone (Linnaeus, 1758)
- Junonia orithya madagascariensis Guenée, 1865
- Protogoniomorpha parhassus (Drury, 1782)
- Precis antilope (Feisthamel, 1850)
- Precis octavia sesamus Trimen, 1883
- Hypolimnas misippus (Linnaeus, 1764)

=== Biblidinae ===
==== Biblidini ====
- Byblia anvatara acheloia (Wallengren, 1857)
- Byblia ilithyia (Drury, 1773)

==== Epicaliini ====
- Sevenia amulia benguelae (Chapman, 1872)
- Sevenia pechueli (Dewitz, 1879)
- Sevenia rosa (Hewitson, 1877)
- Sevenia trimeni (Aurivillius, 1899)

=== Limenitinae ===
==== Limenitidini ====
- Pseudacraea poggei (Dewitz, 1879)

==== Neptidini ====
- Neptis jordani Neave, 1910

==== Adoliadini ====
- Hamanumida daedalus (Fabricius, 1775)

=== Heliconiinae ===
==== Acraeini ====
- Acraea acara acara Hewitson, 1865
- Acraea acara melanophanes Le Cerf, 1927
- Acraea anemosa Hewitson, 1865
- Acraea brainei Henning, 1986 (endemic)
- Acraea hypoleuca Trimen, 1898 (endemic)
- Acraea neobule Doubleday, 1847
- Acraea trimeni Aurivillius, 1899
- Acraea zetes (Linnaeus, 1758)
- Acraea acrita ambigua Trimen, 1891
- Acraea atolmis Westwood, 1881
- Acraea nohara Boisduval, 1847
- Acraea atergatis Westwood, 1881
- Acraea axina Westwood, 1881
- Acraea caldarena Hewitson, 1877
- Acraea ella Eltringham, 1911
- Acraea lygus Druce, 1875
- Acraea natalica Boisduval, 1847
- Acraea stenobea Wallengren, 1860
- Acraea acerata Hewitson, 1874
- Acraea encedon (Linnaeus, 1758)
- Acraea serena (Fabricius, 1775)
- Acraea esebria Hewitson, 1861
- Acraea burni Butler, 1896
- Acraea rahira Boisduval, 1833

==== Vagrantini ====
- Phalanta phalantha aethiopica (Rothschild & Jordan, 1903)

== Hesperiidae ==
=== Coeliadinae ===
- Coeliades forestan (Stoll, [1782])
- Coeliades libeon (Druce, 1875)
- Coeliades pisistratus (Fabricius, 1793)

=== Pyrginae ===
==== Celaenorrhinini ====
- Eretis melania Mabille, 1891
- Sarangesa gaerdesi gaerdesi Evans, 1949
- Sarangesa gaerdesi smithae Vári, 1976
- Sarangesa phidyle (Walker, 1870)
- Sarangesa seineri Strand, 1909
- Alenia namaqua Vári, 1974

==== Tagiadini ====
- Caprona cassualalla Bethune-Baker, 1911
- Abantis paradisea (Butler, 1870)
- Abantis tettensis Hopffer, 1855
- Abantis zambesiaca (Westwood, 1874)

==== Carcharodini ====
- Spialia colotes transvaaliae (Trimen & Bowker, 1889)
- Spialia delagoae (Trimen, 1898)
- Spialia depauperata australis de Jong, 1978
- Spialia diomus ferax (Wallengren, 1863)
- Spialia mafa (Trimen, 1870)
- Spialia nanus (Trimen & Bowker, 1889)
- Spialia secessus (Trimen, 1891)
- Spialia spio (Linnaeus, 1764)
- Gomalia elma (Trimen, 1862)

=== Hesperiinae ===
==== Aeromachini ====
- Kedestes callicles (Hewitson, 1868)
- Kedestes lepenula (Wallengren, 1857)
- Kedestes monostichus Hancock & Gardiner, 1982
- Kedestes sublineata Pennington, 1953 (endemic)
- Andronymus neander (Plötz, 1884)
- Zophopetes dysmephila (Trimen, 1868)
- Platylesches neba (Hewitson, 1877)
- Platylesches shona Evans, 1937
- Platylesches tina Evans, 1937

==== Baorini ====
- Pelopidas mathias (Fabricius, 1798)
- Pelopidas thrax (Hübner, 1821)
- Borbo borbonica (Boisduval, 1833)
- Borbo fallax (Gaede, 1916)
- Borbo fatuellus (Hopffer, 1855)
- Borbo gemella (Mabille, 1884)
- Gegenes niso (Linnaeus, 1764)
- Gegenes pumilio gambica (Mabille, 1878)

=== Heteropterinae ===
- Metisella willemi (Wallengren, 1857)

== See also ==
- List of moths of Namibia
- Wildlife of Namibia
