= Eicochrysops meryamae =

Scientific classification
- Kingdom: Animalia
- Phylum: Arthropoda
- Class: Insecta
- Order: Lepidoptera
- Family: Lycaenidae
- Genus: Eicochrysops
- Species: E. meryamae

Binomial name
- Eicochrysops meryamae Rougeot, 1983

Species of butterfly

Eicochrysops meryamae is a butterfly in the family Lycaenidae. It is found in Ethiopia.
