= Zophopetes ganda =

Scientific classification
- Domain: Eukaryota
- Kingdom: Animalia
- Phylum: Arthropoda
- Class: Insecta
- Order: Lepidoptera
- Family: Hesperiidae
- Genus: Zophopetes
- Species: Z. ganda

Binomial name
- Zophopetes ganda Evans, 1937

Species of butterfly

Zophopetes ganda, the small palm nightfighter, is a butterfly in the family Hesperiidae. It is found in Ivory Coast, Ghana, Togo, Nigeria, Cameroon, Gabon, the Central African Republic, Uganda and north-western Tanzania. The habitat consists of forests, but may also be found in more open areas if the correct palm host plants are present.
