= Leptomyrina handmani =

Scientific classification
- Kingdom: Animalia
- Phylum: Arthropoda
- Class: Insecta
- Order: Lepidoptera
- Family: Lycaenidae
- Genus: Leptomyrina
- Species: L. handmani

Binomial name
- Leptomyrina handmani Gifford, 1965

Synonyms
- Leptomyrina (Gonatomyrina) handmani

Species of butterfly

Leptomyrina handmani is a butterfly in the family Lycaenidae. It is found in southern Malawi and Zambia.

The larvae feed on Kalanchoe and Cotyledon species.
