= Eicochrysops pinheyi =

Scientific classification
- Domain: Eukaryota
- Kingdom: Animalia
- Phylum: Arthropoda
- Class: Insecta
- Order: Lepidoptera
- Family: Lycaenidae
- Genus: Eicochrysops
- Species: E. pinheyi

Binomial name
- Eicochrysops pinheyi Heath, 1985

Species of butterfly

Eicochrysops pinheyi is a butterfly in the family Lycaenidae. It is found in Zambia.
