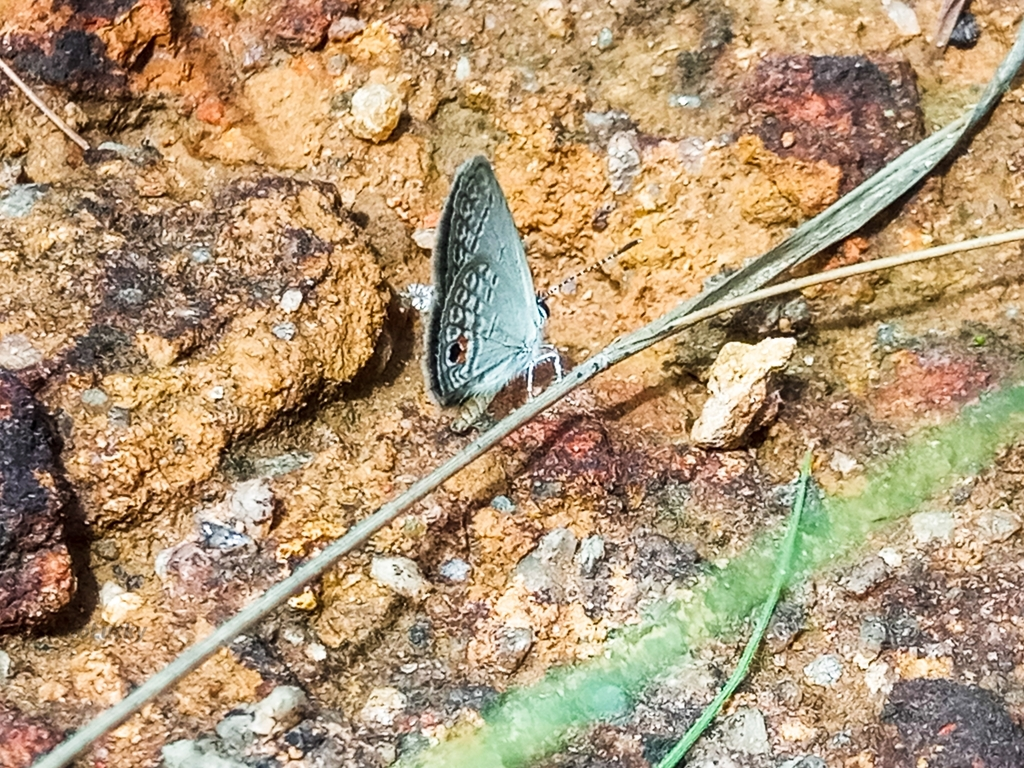

Scientific classification
- Kingdom: Animalia
- Phylum: Arthropoda
- Class: Insecta
- Order: Lepidoptera
- Family: Lycaenidae
- Genus: Eicochrysops
- Species: E. dudgeoni

Binomial name
- Eicochrysops dudgeoni Riley, 1929

= Eicochrysops dudgeoni =

Species of butterfly

Eicochrysops dudgeoni, the Dudgeon's Cupid, is a butterfly in the family Lycaenidae. It is found in Guinea (Nimba Range), Sierra Leone, Ghana, northern Nigeria, northern Cameroon. The habitat consists of Guinea savanna.

Males mud-puddle and both sexes are attracted to flowers.
