= Trimenia (butterfly) =

Silver-spotted coppers

Scientific classification
- Kingdom: Animalia
- Phylum: Arthropoda
- Class: Insecta
- Order: Lepidoptera
- Family: Lycaenidae
- Subfamily: Aphnaeinae
- Genus: Trimenia; Tite & Dickson, 1973
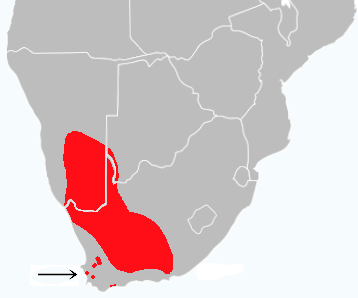
- range of the genus

Synonyms
- Argyrocupha Tite & Dickson, 1973

Butterfly genus in family Lycaenidae

Trimenia is a genus of butterflies in the family Lycaenidae which is endemic to the dryer, western parts of southern Africa. Their orange wings are bounded by dusky brown borders and fringed by chequered termens. The wing undersides are spangled with silvery or shiny markings. They fly in summer but stay close to their colonies, the numbers of which may fluctuate significantly depending on the conditions of the particular season. They may be found along the rocky ledges of hills or escarpments, in dry river beds, wetlands, fynbos, including coastal dune fynbos, succulent or Nama Karoo, or the gravelly or sandy flats found in Namaqualand and Bushmanland.

== Species ==
- Trimenia argyroplaga (Dickson, 1967) — Large silver-spotted copper, widespread in southern Karoo
- Trimenia macmasteri (Dickson, 1968) — McMaster's silver-spotted copper, throughout western Karoo
- Trimenia malagrida (Wallengren, 1857) — Scarce mountain copper, localized in Western Cape
- Trimenia wallengrenii (Trimen, 1887) — Wallengren's silver-spotted copper, very localized in Western Cape
- Trimenia wykehami (Dickson, 1969) — Wykeham's silver-spotted copper, native to the Roggeveld-Nuweveld escarpments
