= Eicochrysops sanyere =

Scientific classification
- Kingdom: Animalia
- Phylum: Arthropoda
- Class: Insecta
- Order: Lepidoptera
- Family: Lycaenidae
- Genus: Eicochrysops
- Species: E. sanyere

Binomial name
- Eicochrysops sanyere Libert, 1993

Species of butterfly

Eicochrysops sanyere is a butterfly in the family Lycaenidae. It is found in northern Cameroon.
