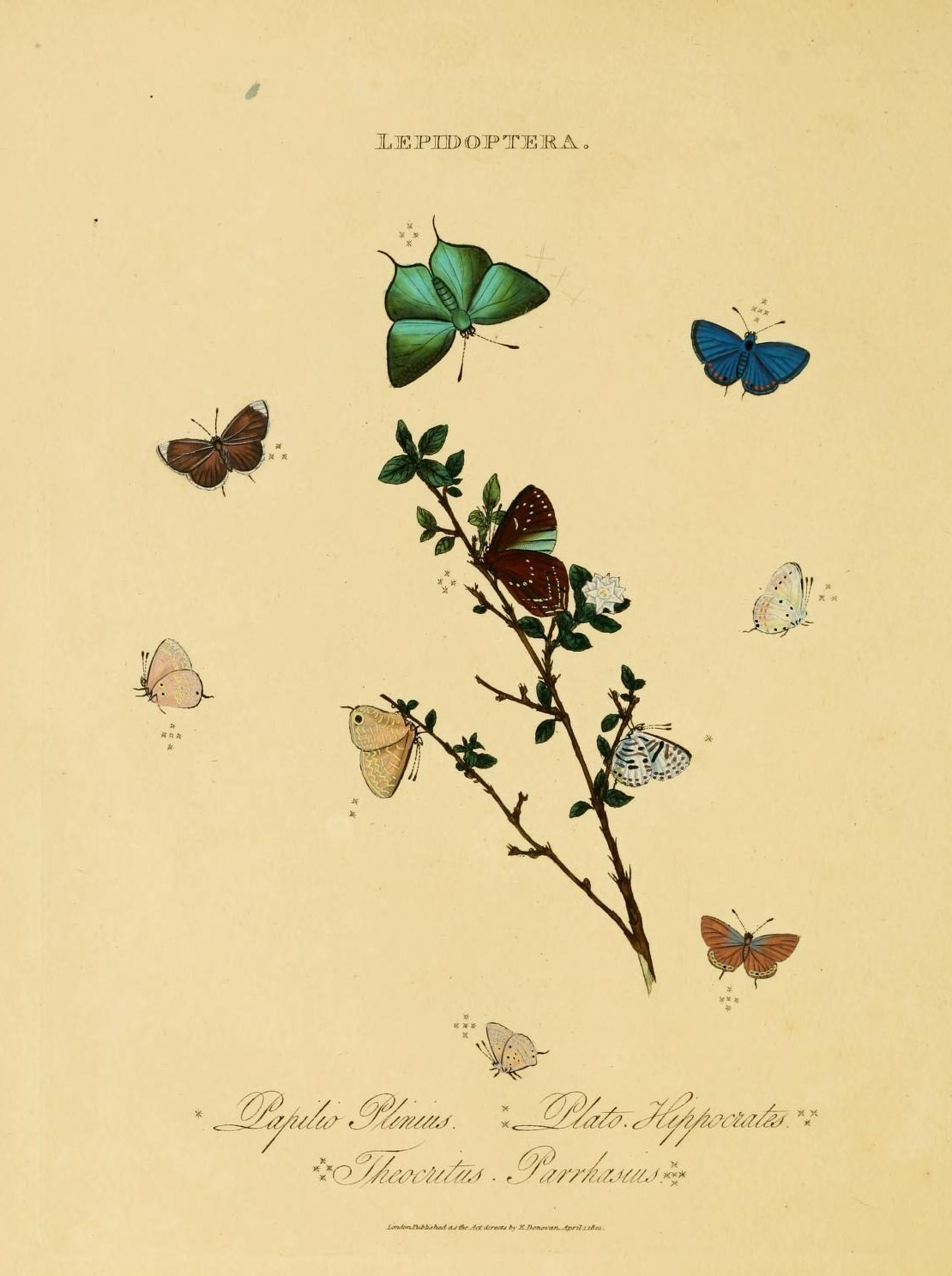

Scientific classification
- Domain: Eukaryota
- Kingdom: Animalia
- Phylum: Arthropoda
- Class: Insecta
- Order: Lepidoptera
- Family: Lycaenidae
- Subfamily: Polyommatinae
- Tribe: Polyommatini
- Genus: Eicochrysops; Bethune-Baker, 1924

= Eicochrysops =

Butterfly genus in family Lycaenidae

Eicochrysops is a genus of butterflies in the family Lycaenidae. It is endemic to the Afrotropics.

== Species ==
- Eicochrysops antoto (Strand, 1911)
- Eicochrysops damiri Turlin, 1995
- Eicochrysops distractus (de Joannis & Verity, 1913)
- Eicochrysops dudgeoni Riley, 1929
- Eicochrysops eicotrochilus Bethune-Baker, 1924
- Eicochrysops fontainei Stempffer, 1961
- Eicochrysops hippocrates (Fabricius, 1793)
- Eicochrysops masai (Bethune-Baker, 1905)
- Eicochrysops meryamae Rougeot, 1983
- Eicochrysops messapus (Godart, [1824])
- Eicochrysops pauliani Stempffer, 1950
- Eicochrysops pinheyi Heath, 1985
- Eicochrysops rogersi Bethune-Baker, 1924
- Eicochrysops sanguigutta (Mabille, 1879)
- Eicochrysops sanyere Libert, 1993
