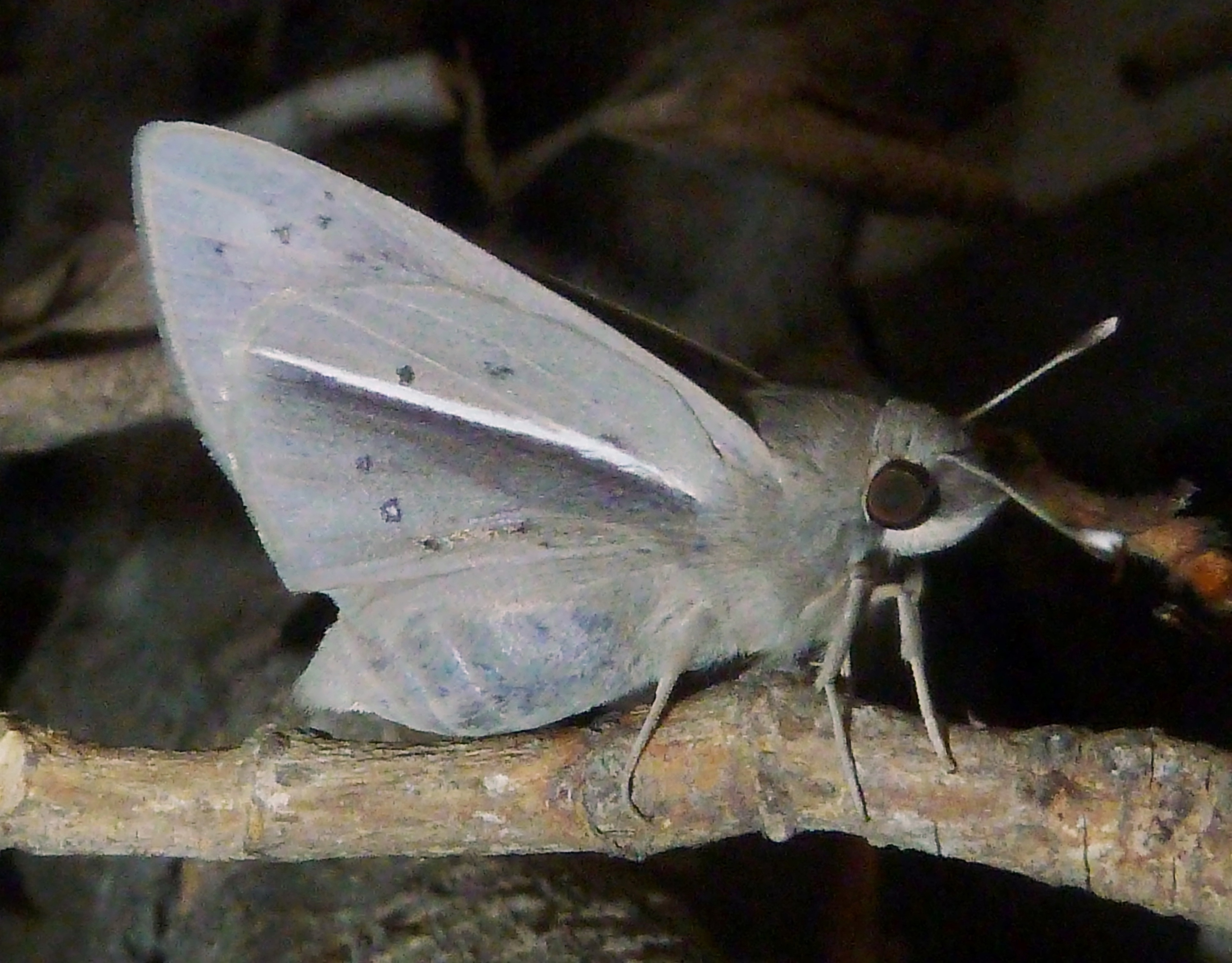
- Z. dysmephila

Scientific classification
- Kingdom: Animalia
- Phylum: Arthropoda
- Clade: Pancrustacea
- Class: Insecta
- Order: Lepidoptera
- Family: Hesperiidae
- Tribe: Megathymini
- Genus: Zophopetes; Mabille, 1904

= Zophopetes =

Genus of butterflies

Zophopetes is a genus of skippers in the family Hesperiidae.

== Species ==
- Zophopetes cerymica (Hewitson, 1867)
- Zophopetes dysmephila (Trimen, 1868)
- Zophopetes ganda Evans, 1937
- Zophopetes haifa Evans, 1937
- Zophopetes nobilior (Holland, 1896)
- Zophopetes quaternata (Mabille, 1876)
