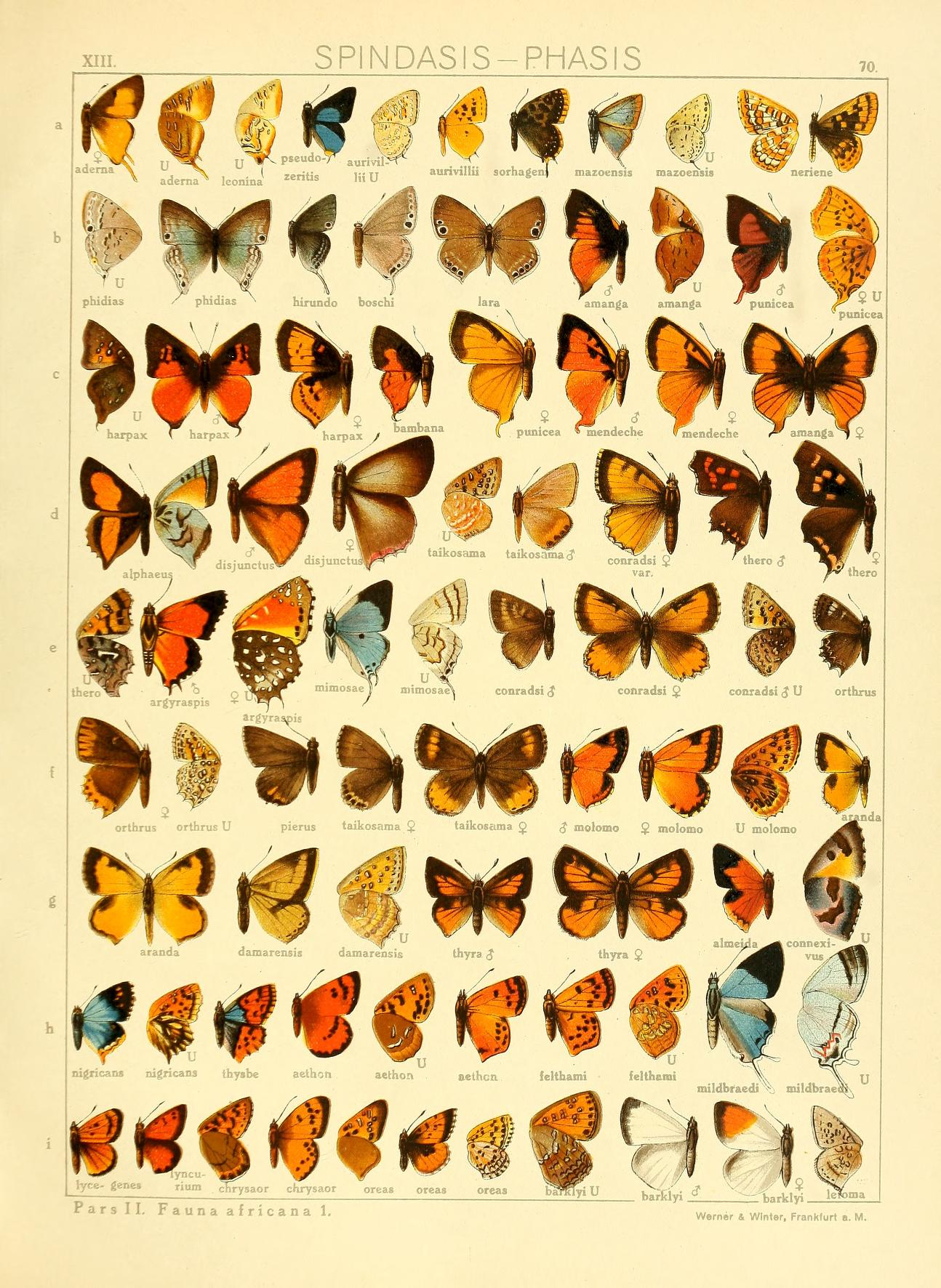

Conservation status
- Least Concern (IUCN 3.1)

Scientific classification
- Kingdom: Animalia
- Phylum: Arthropoda
- Class: Insecta
- Order: Lepidoptera
- Family: Lycaenidae
- Genus: Leptomyrina
- Species: L. boschi

Binomial name
- Leptomyrina boschi Strand, 1911

= Leptomyrina boschi =

Species of butterfly

Leptomyrina boschi is a butterfly in the family Lycaenidae. It is found in the Ethiopian Highlands of central Ethiopia
