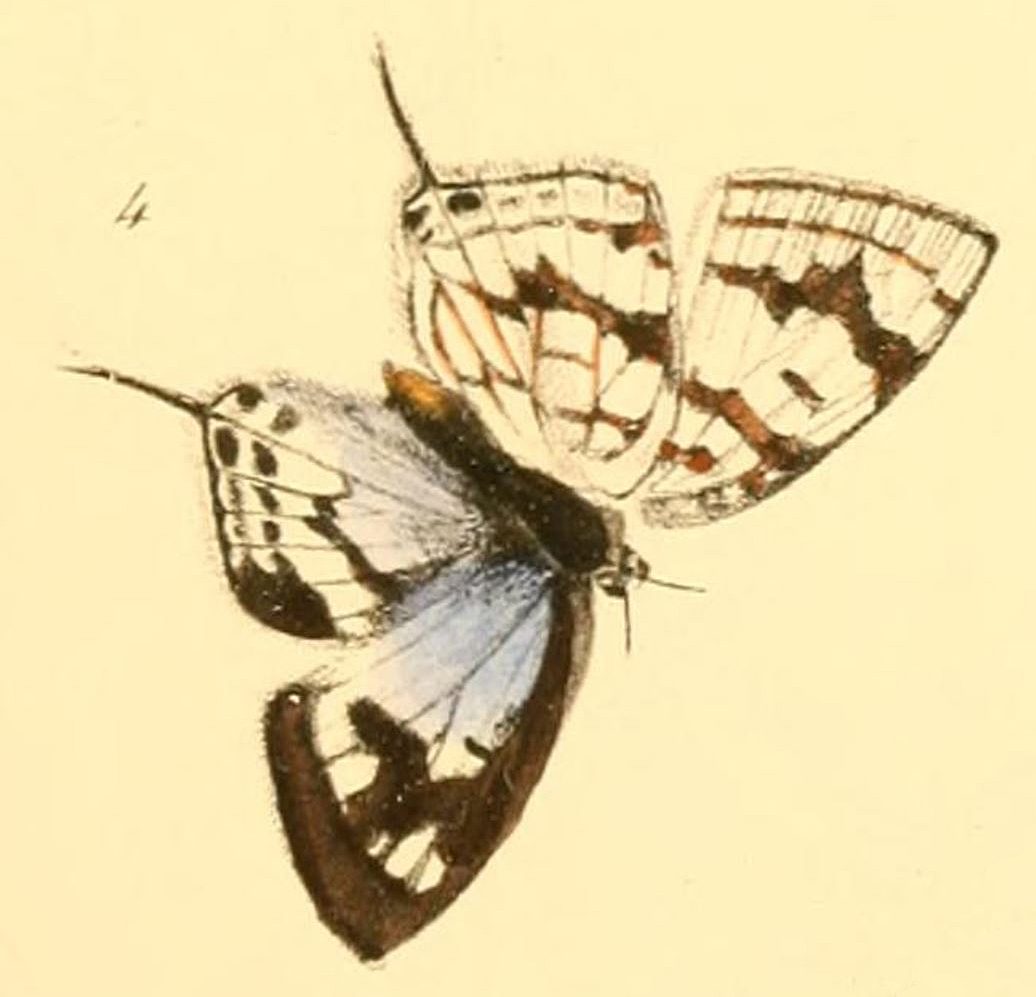

Conservation status
- Least Concern (IUCN 3.1)

Scientific classification
- Kingdom: Animalia
- Phylum: Arthropoda
- Class: Insecta
- Order: Lepidoptera
- Family: Lycaenidae
- Genus: Leptomyrina
- Species: L. hirundo

Binomial name
- Leptomyrina hirundo (Wallengren, 1857)

Synonyms
- Thecla hirundo Wallengren, 1857

= Leptomyrina hirundo =

Species of butterfly

Leptomyrina hirundo, the tailed black-eye, is a butterfly of the family Lycaenidae. It is found from South Africa to the coast of eastern Kenya and Malawi. In South Africa it is found in warm wooded savannah from the Eastern Cape to coastal KwaZulu-Natal and inland in riverine forest to Swaziland, Mpumalanga and Limpopo.

The wingspan is 19–24 mm for males and 19.5–26 mm for females. Adults are on wing year round in warmer areas with peaks in November and March.

The larvae feed on Kalanchoe, Crassula, Byrophyllum and Cotyledon species.
