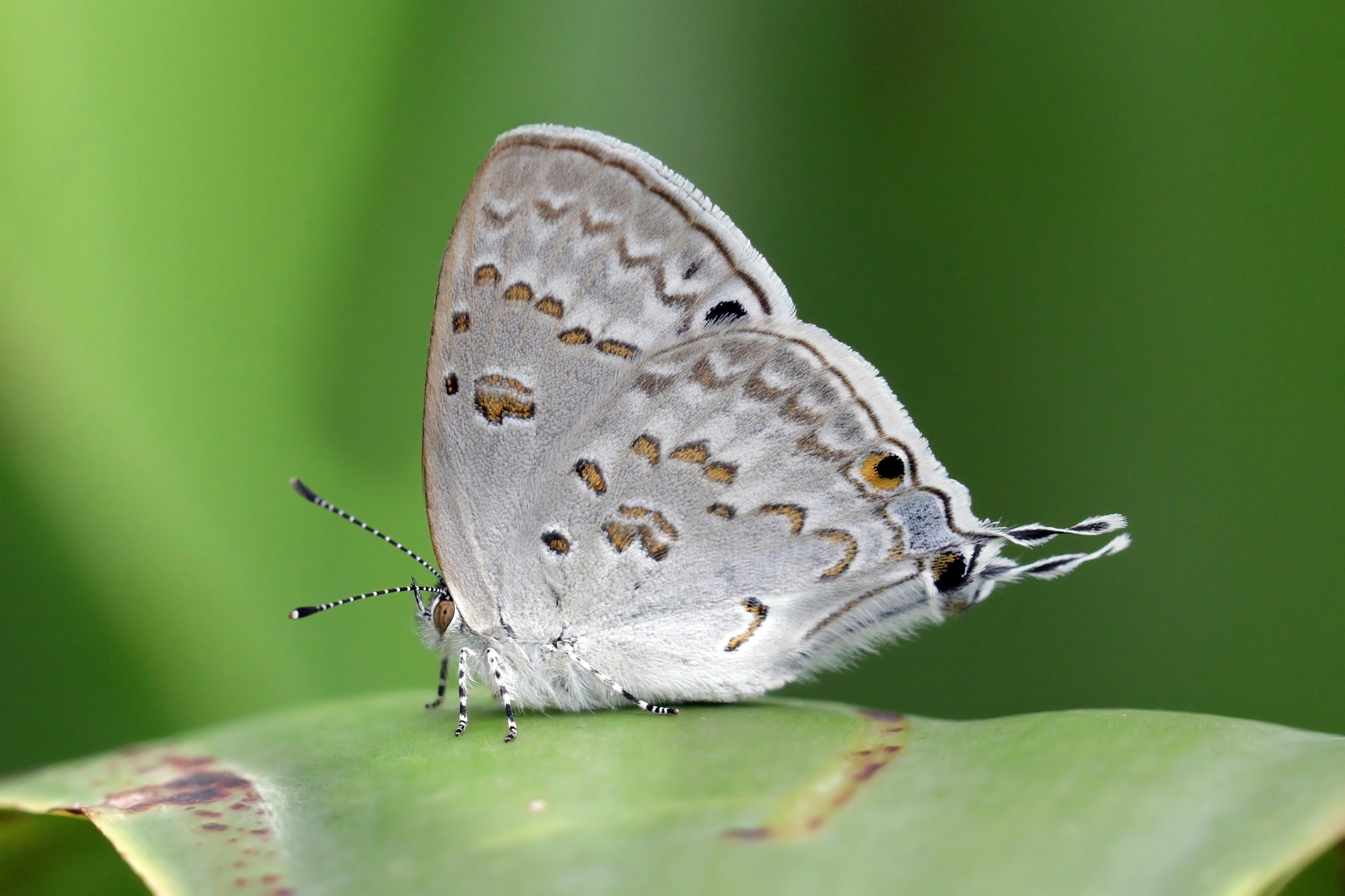
- Madagascar black-eye (L. phidias)

Scientific classification
- Kingdom: Animalia
- Phylum: Arthropoda
- Class: Insecta
- Order: Lepidoptera
- Family: Lycaenidae
- Tribe: Hypolycaenini
- Genus: Leptomyrina; Butler, 1898

Synonyms
- Gonatomyrina Aurivillius, 1924

= Leptomyrina =

Butterfly genus in family Lycaenidae

Leptomyrina is a butterfly genus in the family Lycaenidae. The species of this genus are found in the Afrotropical realm.

== Species ==
- Subgenus Leptomyrina Butler, 1898
  - Leptomyrina boschi Strand, 1911
  - Leptomyrina hirundo (Wallengren, 1857)
  - Leptomyrina makala Bethune-Baker, 1908
  - Leptomyrina phidias (Fabricius, 1793)
  - Leptomyrina sudanica Stempffer, 1964
- Subgenus Gonatomyrina Aurivillius, 1924
  - Leptomyrina gorgias (Stoll, [1790])
  - Leptomyrina handmani Gifford, 1965
  - Leptomyrina henningi Dickson, 1976
  - Leptomyrina lara (Linnaeus, 1764)
