= Zophopetes haifa =

Scientific classification
- Domain: Eukaryota
- Kingdom: Animalia
- Phylum: Arthropoda
- Class: Insecta
- Order: Lepidoptera
- Family: Hesperiidae
- Genus: Zophopetes
- Species: Z. haifa

Binomial name
- Zophopetes haifa Evans, 1937

Species of butterfly

Zophopetes haifa, the scarce palm nightfighter, is a butterfly in the family Hesperiidae. It is found in Ivory Coast and Cameroon.
