= Eicochrysops distractus =

Scientific classification
- Domain: Eukaryota
- Kingdom: Animalia
- Phylum: Arthropoda
- Class: Insecta
- Order: Lepidoptera
- Family: Lycaenidae
- Genus: Eicochrysops
- Species: E. distractus

Binomial name
- Eicochrysops distractus (de Joannis & Verity, 1913)

Synonyms
- Catochrysops distractus de Joannis & Verity, 1913; Catochrysops pusillus Ungemach, 1932

Species of butterfly

Eicochrysops distractus is a butterfly in the family Lycaenidae. It is found in Ethiopia, northern Uganda, Kenya, Tanzania (Mount Longido) and Yemen.
