= Eicochrysops rogersi =

Scientific classification
- Kingdom: Animalia
- Phylum: Arthropoda
- Clade: Pancrustacea
- Class: Insecta
- Order: Lepidoptera
- Family: Lycaenidae
- Genus: Eicochrysops
- Species: E. rogersi

Binomial name
- Eicochrysops rogersi Bethune-Baker, 1924

Species of butterfly

Eicochrysops rogersi, the Rogers' blue, is a butterfly in the family Lycaenidae. It is found in central and southern Kenya and possibly Tanzania. The habitat consists of savanna.
