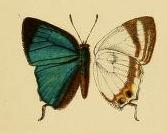

Scientific classification
- Kingdom: Animalia
- Phylum: Arthropoda
- Class: Insecta
- Order: Lepidoptera
- Family: Lycaenidae
- Genus: Leptomyrina
- Species: L. makala

Binomial name
- Leptomyrina makala Bethune-Baker, 1908

= Leptomyrina makala =

Species of butterfly

Leptomyrina makala is a butterfly in the family Lycaenidae. It is found in Kivu in the Democratic Republic of the Congo and in western Uganda.
