= Trimenia malagrida =

Scarce mountain copper

Scientific classification
- Domain: Eukaryota
- Kingdom: Animalia
- Phylum: Arthropoda
- Class: Insecta
- Order: Lepidoptera
- Family: Lycaenidae
- Genus: Trimenia
- Species: T. malagrida

Binomial name
- Trimenia malagrida (Wallengren, 1857)

Synonyms
- Cigaritis malagrida Wallengren, 1857; Argyrocupha malagrida; Zeritis aglaspis Trimen, 1862; Argyrocupha malagrida cedrusmontana Dickson & Stephen, 1975; Argyrocupha malagrida maryae Dickson & Henning, 1980; Phasis malagrida paarlensis Dickson, 1967; Argyrocupha malagrida paarlensis

Species of butterfly

Trimenia malagrida (scarce mountain copper) is a butterfly of the family Lycaenidae. It is found in South Africa, where it is found from Beaufort West to the Roggeveld escarpment in the Western Cape.

The wingspan is 24–29 mm for males and 29–33 mm females. Adults are on wing from late January to March. There is one generation per year.

The larvae of ssp. maryae are attended to by Anoplolepis custodiens ants.

== Subspecies ==
- Trimenia malagrida malagrida (Cape Peninsula)
- Trimenia malagrida cedrusmontana (Dickson & Stephen, 1975) (Cederberg and Skurweberg)
- Trimenia malagrida maryae (Dickson & Henning, 1980) (coastal dune fynbos from De Hoop to Witsand)
- Trimenia malagrida paarlensis (Dickson, 1967) (Paarl Mountain and Paardeberg)
