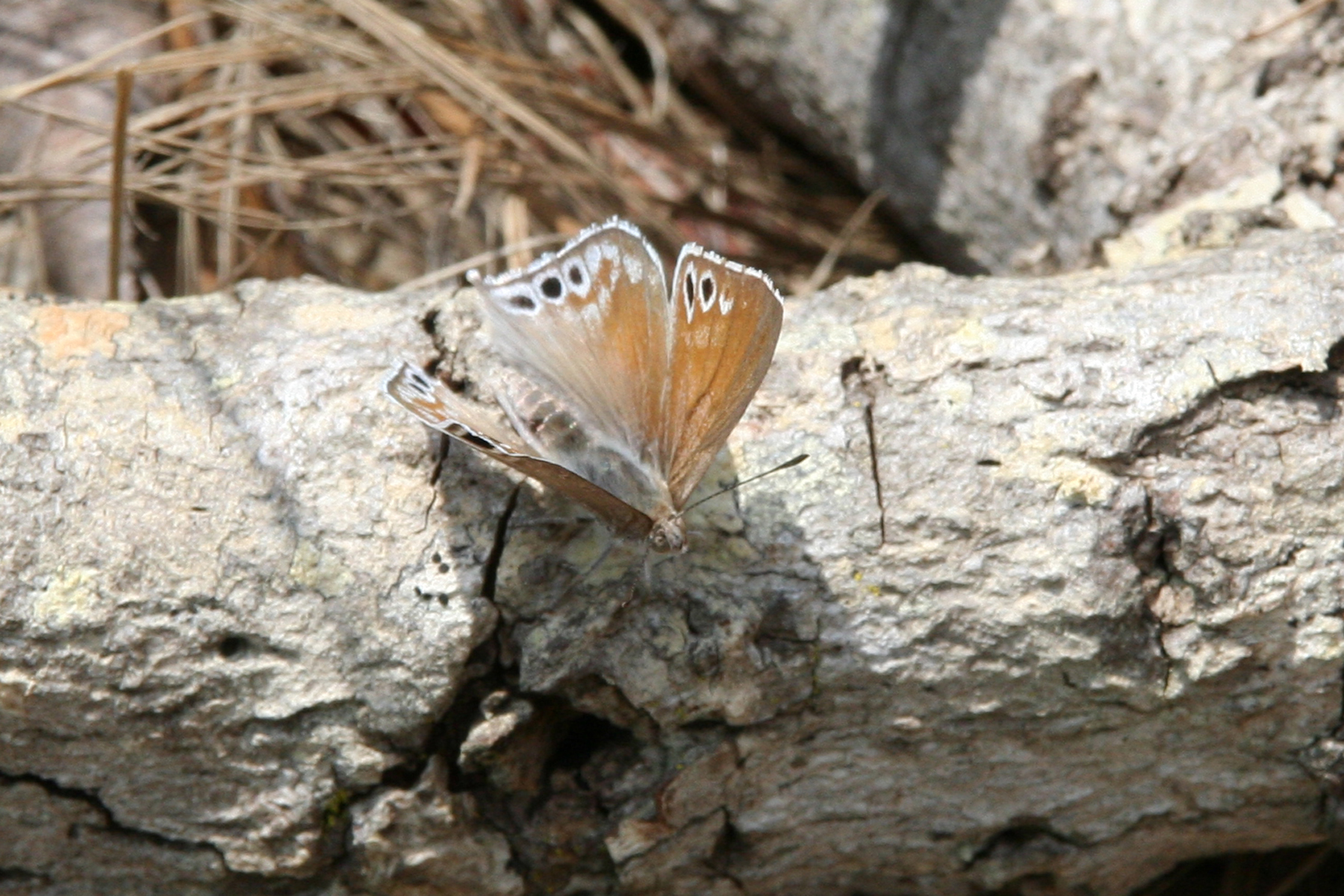

Scientific classification
- Kingdom: Animalia
- Phylum: Arthropoda
- Class: Insecta
- Order: Lepidoptera
- Family: Lycaenidae
- Genus: Leptomyrina
- Species: L. gorgias

Binomial name
- Leptomyrina gorgias (Stoll, [1790])

Synonyms
- Papilio gorgias Stoll, [1790]; Gonamyrina gorgias; Leptomyrina lara cana Talbot, 1935; Leptomyrina lara sobrina Talbot, 1935

= Leptomyrina gorgias =

Species of butterfly

Leptomyrina gorgias, the common black-eye, is a butterfly of the family Lycaenidae. It is found in southern Africa.

The wingspan is 18.5–29 mm for males and 25–32 mm for females. Adults are on wing, year round, with peaks in November and March.

The larvae feed on Kalanchoe, Crassula and Cotyledon species.

== Subspecies ==
- Leptomyrina gorgias gorgias (East Cape, KwaZulu-Natal, Transvaal, Orange Free State, southern Mozambique)
- Leptomyrina gorgias sobrina Talbot, 1935 (Somalia, eastern Kenya, Tanzania, northern Mozambique, Zambia)
- Leptomyrina gorgias cana Talbot, 1935 (western Kenya, Uganda)
