= Eicochrysops damiri =

Scientific classification
- Domain: Eukaryota
- Kingdom: Animalia
- Phylum: Arthropoda
- Class: Insecta
- Order: Lepidoptera
- Family: Lycaenidae
- Genus: Eicochrysops
- Species: E. damiri

Binomial name
- Eicochrysops damiri Turlin, 1995

Species of butterfly

Eicochrysops damiri is a butterfly in the family Lycaenidae. It is found on the Comoros in the Indian Ocean.
