= Eicochrysops pauliani =

Scientific classification
- Domain: Eukaryota
- Kingdom: Animalia
- Phylum: Arthropoda
- Class: Insecta
- Order: Lepidoptera
- Family: Lycaenidae
- Genus: Eicochrysops
- Species: E. pauliani

Binomial name
- Eicochrysops pauliani Stempffer, 1950

Species of butterfly

Eicochrysops pauliani is a butterfly in the family Lycaenidae. It is found on Madagascar. The habitat consists of forests.
