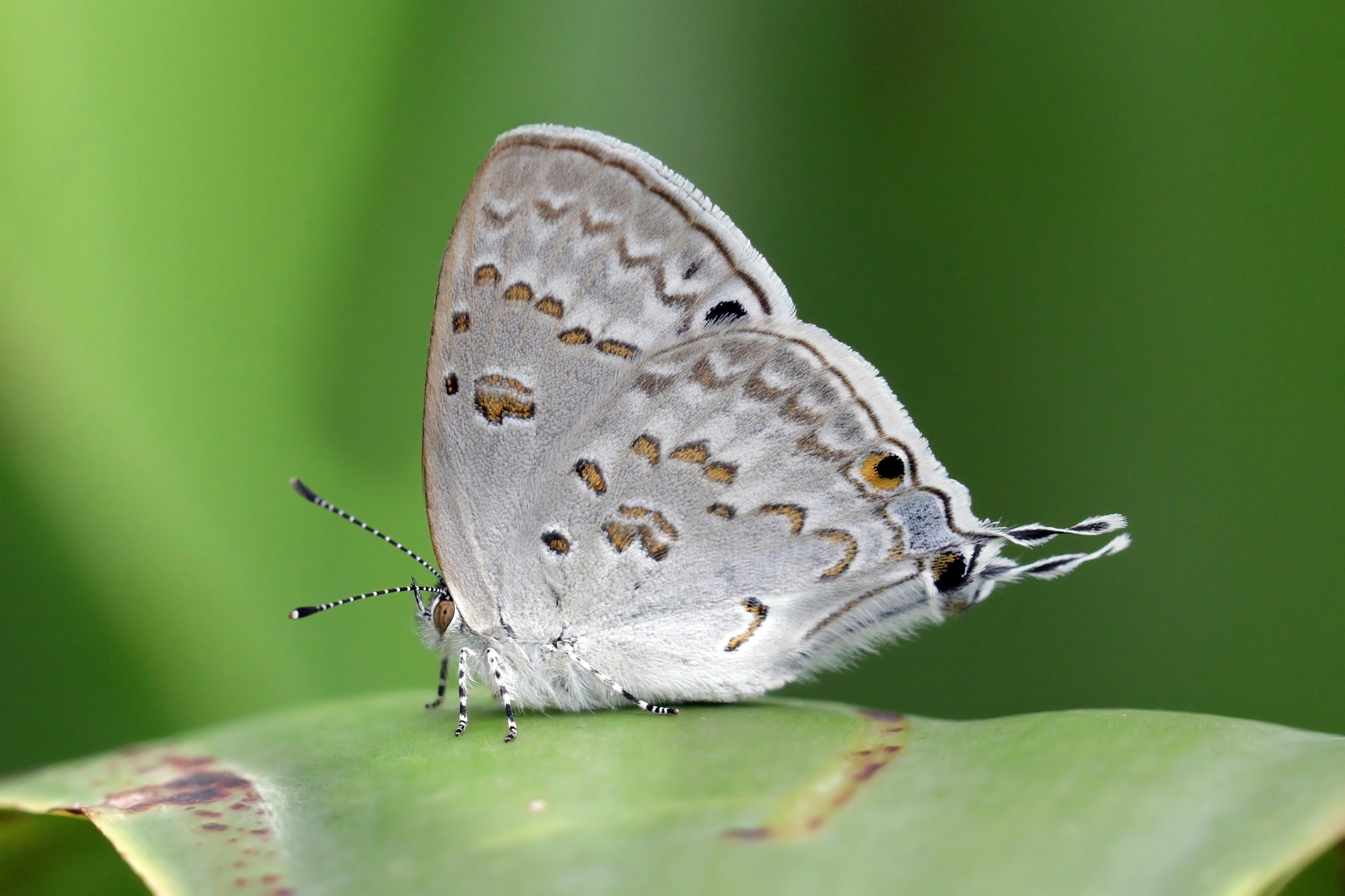
- Peyrieras Nature Reserve, Madagascar

Scientific classification
- Kingdom: Animalia
- Phylum: Arthropoda
- Class: Insecta
- Order: Lepidoptera
- Family: Lycaenidae
- Genus: Leptomyrina
- Species: L. phidias

Binomial name
- Leptomyrina phidias (Fabricius, 1793)

Synonyms
- Hesperia phidias Fabricius, 1793; Lycaena rabe Boisduval, 1833

= Leptomyrina phidias =

Species of butterfly

Leptomyrina phidias is a butterfly in the family Lycaenidae. It is found on Madagascar and Réunion. The habitat consists of rocky areas with rupicolous vegetation (growing on rocks) and anthropogenic environments.

The larvae feed on Bryophyllum species including B. delagoense, B. daigremontianum, B. proliferum and B. pinnatum.

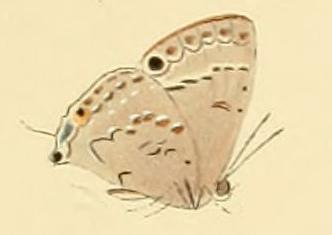

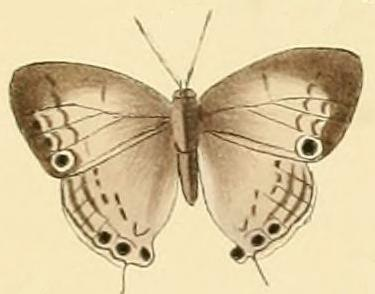
