= Eicochrysops antoto =

Scientific classification
- Kingdom: Animalia
- Phylum: Arthropoda
- Class: Insecta
- Order: Lepidoptera
- Family: Lycaenidae
- Genus: Eicochrysops
- Species: E. antoto

Binomial name
- Eicochrysops antoto (Strand, 1911)

Synonyms
- Cupido antoto Strand, 1911

Species of butterfly

Eicochrysops antoto is a butterfly in the family Lycaenidae. It is found in Ethiopia.
