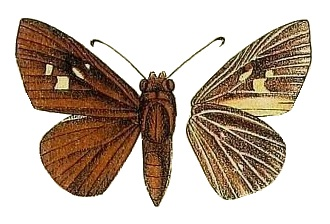
- Z. nobilior, female

Scientific classification
- Kingdom: Animalia
- Phylum: Arthropoda
- Class: Insecta
- Order: Lepidoptera
- Family: Hesperiidae
- Genus: Zophopetes
- Species: Z. nobilior

Binomial name
- Zophopetes nobilior (Holland, 1896)

Synonyms
- Ploetzia nobilior Holland, 1896

= Zophopetes nobilior =

Noble nightfighter

Species of butterfly

Zophopetes nobilior, commonly known as the noble nightfighter, is a butterfly in the family Hesperiidae. It is found in Gabon, the eastern part of the Democratic Republic of the Congo, Tanzania, Uganda, and Kenya. In Kenya the introduced coconut has been recorded as food plant. Like other species in its genus, the imago has crepuscular habits. It is known to feed from flowers at dawn.
