= Leptomyrina sudanica =

Conservation status
- Data Deficient (IUCN 3.1)

Scientific classification
- Kingdom: Animalia
- Phylum: Arthropoda
- Class: Insecta
- Order: Lepidoptera
- Family: Lycaenidae
- Genus: Leptomyrina
- Species: L. sudanica

Binomial name
- Leptomyrina sudanica Stempffer, 1964

Species of butterfly

Leptomyrina sudanica is a butterfly in the family Lycaenidae. It is found in Sudan.

It is known only from Kassala State of eastern Sudan, between 1,000 and 1,300 metres elevation.
