= Trimenia wallengrenii =

Wallengren's copper

Conservation status
- Endangered (IUCN 2.3)

Scientific classification
- Kingdom: Animalia
- Phylum: Arthropoda
- Class: Insecta
- Order: Lepidoptera
- Family: Lycaenidae
- Genus: Trimenia
- Species: T. wallengrenii

Binomial name
- Trimenia wallengrenii (Trimen & Bowker, 1887)
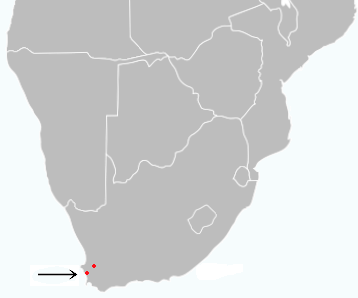
- ● Ranges of the two subspecies

Synonyms
- Zeritis wallengrenii Trimen, 1887; Phasis wallengrenii

Species of butterfly

Trimenia wallengrenii, the Wallengren's copper or Wallengren's silver-spotted copper, is a species of butterfly in the family Lycaenidae. It is endemic to South Africa.

The wingspan is 24–35 mm for males and 29–42 mm females. Adults are on wing from November to December. There is one generation per year.

== Subspecies ==
- Trimenia wallengrenii wallengrenii — near Darling in the Western Cape
- Trimenia wallengrenii gonnemoi Ball, 1994 — upper slopes of the Piketberg in the Western Cape
