= Zophopetes quaternata =

Scientific classification
- Domain: Eukaryota
- Kingdom: Animalia
- Phylum: Arthropoda
- Class: Insecta
- Order: Lepidoptera
- Family: Hesperiidae
- Genus: Zophopetes
- Species: Z. quaternata

Binomial name
- Zophopetes quaternata (Mabille, 1876)

Synonyms
- Pamphila quaternata Mabille, 1876

Species of butterfly

Zophopetes quaternata, the western palm nightfighter, is a butterfly in the family Hesperiidae. It is found in Senegal, the Gambia, Guinea, Ivory Coast and Ghana.

The larvae feed on Phoenix reclinata.
