= Trimenia argyroplaga =

Large silver-spotted copper

Scientific classification
- Domain: Eukaryota
- Kingdom: Animalia
- Phylum: Arthropoda
- Class: Insecta
- Order: Lepidoptera
- Family: Lycaenidae
- Genus: Trimenia
- Species: T. argyroplaga

Binomial name
- Trimenia argyroplaga (Dickson, 1967)

Synonyms
- Phasis argyroplaga Dickson, 1967; Zeritis wallengreni var. A Trimen, 1887

Species of butterfly

Trimenia argyroplaga, the large silver-spotted copper, is a butterfly of the family Lycaenidae. It is found in South Africa.

The wingspan is 25–34 mm for males and 29–41 mm females. Adults are on wing from November to December. There is one generation per year.

== Subspecies ==
- Trimenia argyroplaga argyroplaga (from Western Cape to Eastern Cape and in the Northern Cape)
- Trimenia argyroplaga cardouwae Dickson & Wykeham, 1994 (Olifantrivierberge above Porterville in the Western Cape)
