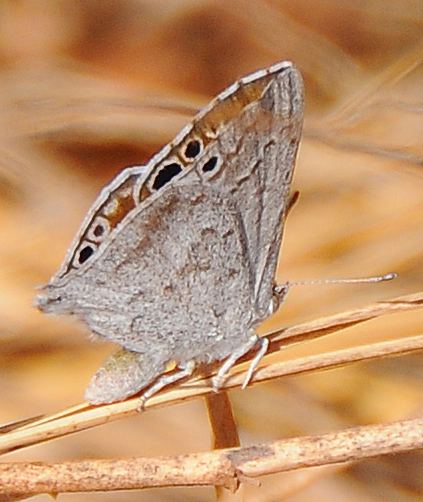

Scientific classification
- Kingdom: Animalia
- Phylum: Arthropoda
- Class: Insecta
- Order: Lepidoptera
- Family: Lycaenidae
- Genus: Leptomyrina
- Species: L. henningi

Binomial name
- Leptomyrina henningi Dickson, 1976

= Leptomyrina henningi =

Species of butterfly

Leptomyrina henningi, the Henning's black-eye, is a butterfly of the family Lycaenidae. It occurs in south-west Africa, Botswana and Zimbabwe. In South Africa, it occurs in Free State to Gauteng, Limpopo and North West.

Its wingspan measures 18.5–29 mm for males and 25–32 mm for females. Adults are on wing year round with peaks in November and March.

The larvae feed on Crassula alba and Cotyledon orbiculata.
