= Eicochrysops fontainei =

Scientific classification
- Kingdom: Animalia
- Phylum: Arthropoda
- Class: Insecta
- Order: Lepidoptera
- Family: Lycaenidae
- Genus: Eicochrysops
- Species: E. fontainei

Binomial name
- Eicochrysops fontainei Stempffer, 1961

Species of butterfly

Eicochrysops fontainei is a butterfly in the family Lycaenidae. It is found in the Democratic Republic of the Congo.
