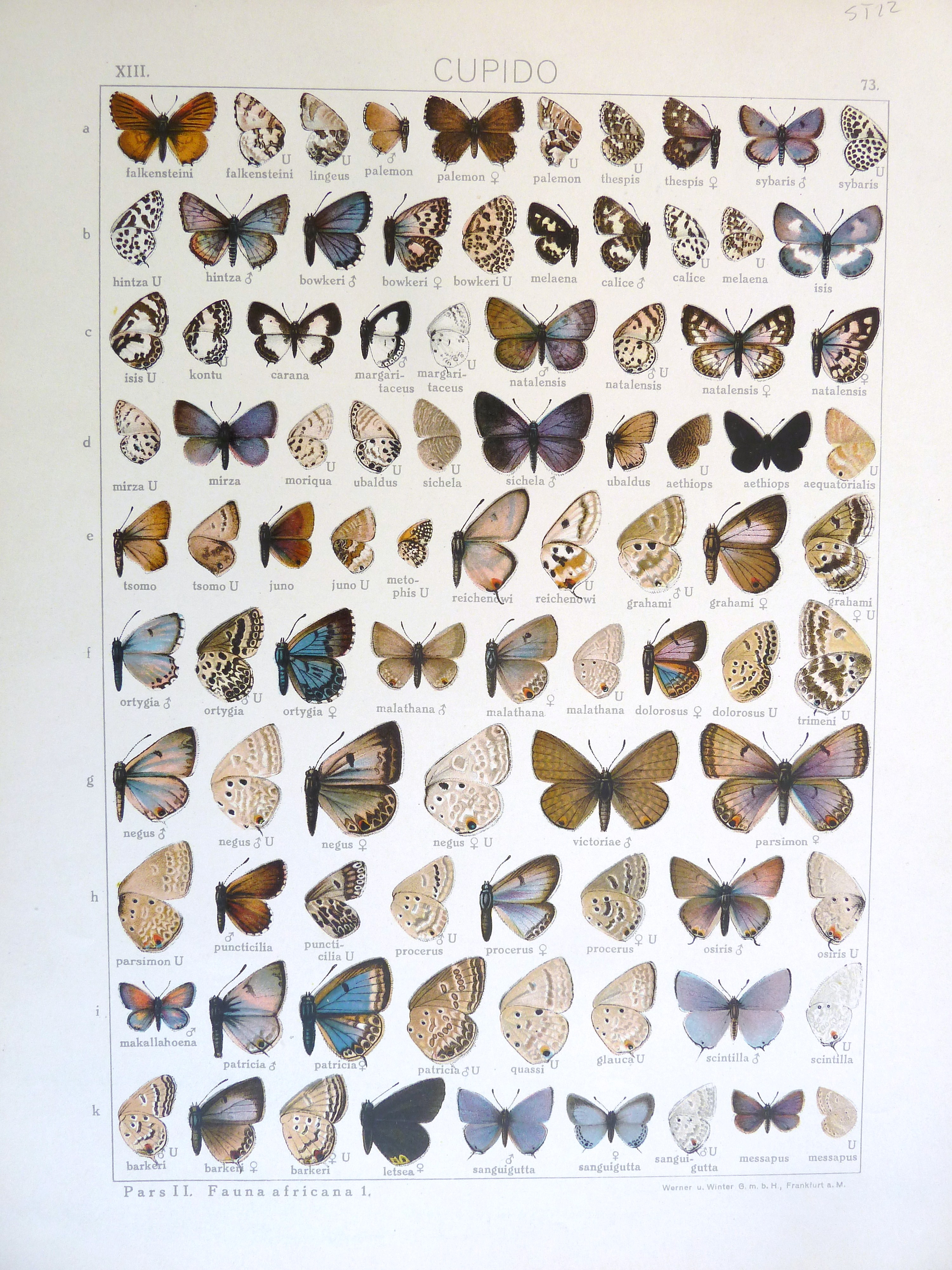
- k

Scientific classification
- Domain: Eukaryota
- Kingdom: Animalia
- Phylum: Arthropoda
- Class: Insecta
- Order: Lepidoptera
- Family: Lycaenidae
- Genus: Eicochrysops
- Species: E. sanguigutta

Binomial name
- Eicochrysops sanguigutta (Mabille, 1879)

Synonyms
- Lycaena sanguigutta Mabille, 1879; Lycaena caeuleoarcuata Saalmüller, 1884

= Eicochrysops sanguigutta =

Species of butterfly

Eicochrysops sanguigutta is a butterfly in the family Lycaenidae. It is found on Madagascar and the Comoros. The habitat consists of forests.
