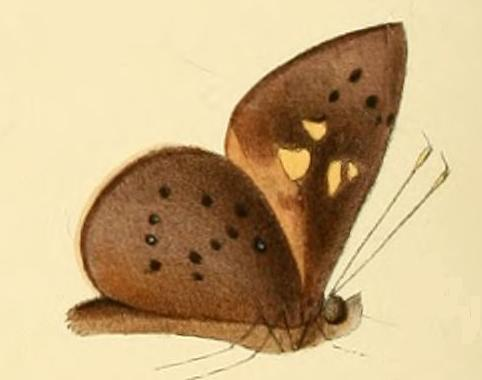

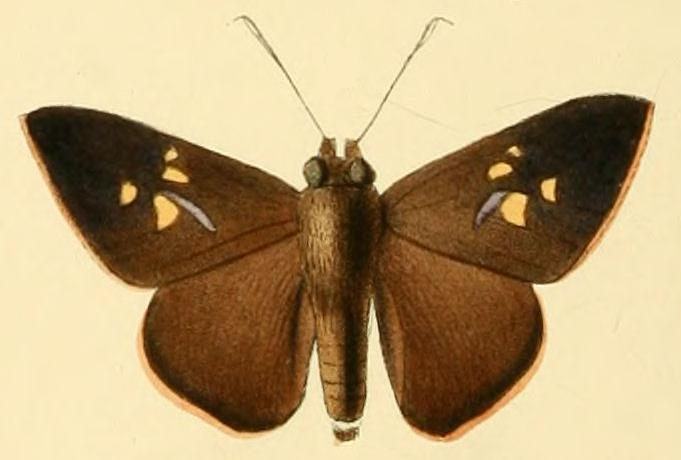

Scientific classification
- Kingdom: Animalia
- Phylum: Arthropoda
- Clade: Pancrustacea
- Class: Insecta
- Order: Lepidoptera
- Family: Hesperiidae
- Genus: Zophopetes
- Species: Z. cerymica

Binomial name
- Zophopetes cerymica (Hewitson, 1867)

Synonyms
- Hesperia cerymica Hewitson, 1867; Hesperia weiglei Plötz, 1886

= Zophopetes cerymica =

Common palm nightfighter

Species of butterfly

Zophopetes cerymica, the common palm nightfighter, is a butterfly in the family Hesperiidae. It is found in Senegal, Gambia, Guinea-Bissau, Guinea, Burkina Faso, Sierra Leone, Liberia, Ivory Coast, Ghana, Togo, Benin, Nigeria, Cameroon, Angola, the eastern part of the Democratic Republic of the Congo and north-western Zambia. It is found in various habitats, as long as palms are present.

Adults have been recorded feeding from red flowers of a root parasite.

The larvae feed on Elaeis guineensis, Cocos nucifera, Raphia, Borassus and Phoenix species.

Torben Larsen developed a species numbering system for his 2005 publication Butterflies of West Africa. This species is #1374. The 'Larsen' numbers have since been used with permission in A Sharp Eye on Butterflies of Ghana.
