= Eicochrysops masai =

Scientific classification
- Kingdom: Animalia
- Phylum: Arthropoda
- Class: Insecta
- Order: Lepidoptera
- Family: Lycaenidae
- Genus: Eicochrysops
- Species: E. masai

Binomial name
- Eicochrysops masai (Bethune-Baker, 1905)

Synonyms
- Everes masai Bethune-Baker, 1905

Species of butterfly

Eicochrysops masai, the Masai blue, is a butterfly in the family Lycaenidae. It is found in Ethiopia, northern Uganda, central and northern Kenya and northern Tanzania. Their habitat consists of grassy savanna.
