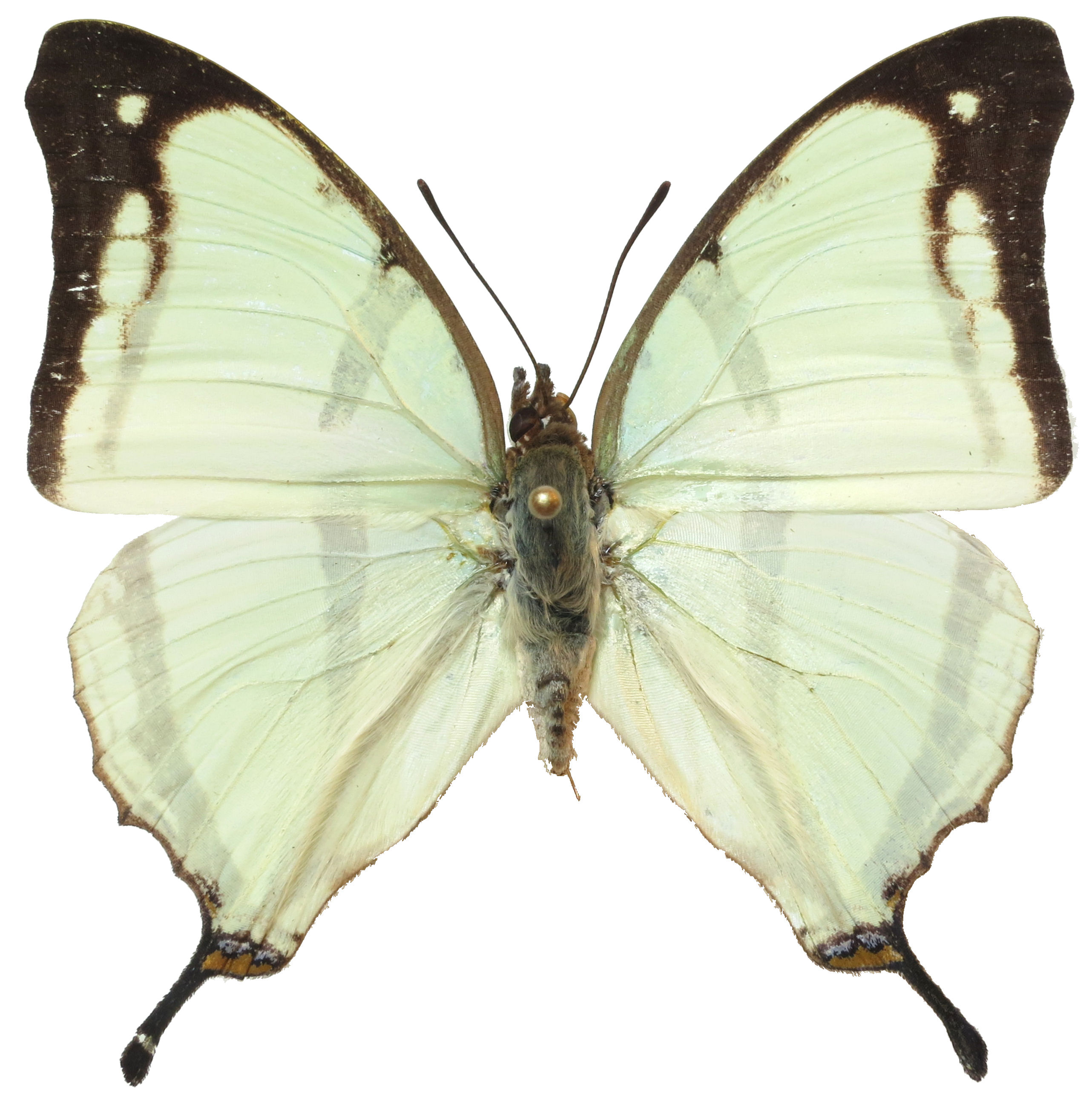
- From Boukoko, CAR

Scientific classification
- Domain: Eukaryota
- Kingdom: Animalia
- Phylum: Arthropoda
- Class: Insecta
- Order: Lepidoptera
- Family: Nymphalidae
- Genus: Charaxes
- Species: C. kahldeni

Binomial name
- Charaxes kahldeni Homeyer & Dewitz, 1882

Synonyms
- Charaxes homeyeri Homeyer and Dewitz, 1882; Charaxes w-brunnea Bethune-Baker, 1908; Charaxes homeyeri f. bellus Strand, 1914; Charaxes kahldeni apicalis Röber, 1925

= Charaxes kahldeni =

Species of butterfly

Charaxes kahldeni is a butterfly in the family Nymphalidae. It is found in northern Angola, the Democratic Republic of the Congo, the Republic of the Congo, Gabon, Cameroon, the Central African Republic, Uganda and southern Sudan. Its habitat is forests.

== Description ==
Very similar to Charaxes zoolina. Hindwing underside in cell 1c with a black longitudinal stripe, which extends almost to the anal angle and joins with the similar median strip.

== Description in Seitz ==
Ch. kahldeni. Hindwing beneath in cellule lc with a black longitudinal stripe, extending from the base nearly to the anal angle and posteriorly joined to the median stripe, which is also black- kahldeni Homeyer and Dew. (= W-brunnea Baker). Both wings greenish white; distal and costal margins of the hind wing narrowly black; from the costal margin arises a black submarginal line, which beneath reaches to vein 1, but above at furthest to vein 2. Hindwing above only with a fine marginal line and three submarginal spots (in cellules lc-3) black, beneath, in addition to the two stripes already mentioned, with a thick black sub marginal line and a fine marginal line. Cameroons to Angola. In f. homeyeri Dewthe basal half of the forewing above is whitish, the apical part yellow-brown with rust-brown marginal band spotted with yellow; hindwing above whitish with a rust-brown marginal band about 3 mm. in breadth. Under surface brownish, sprinkled with darker dots, as in the type-form with longitudinal stripe in 1 c and a median band, but with dark dots instead of the submarginal stripes. Cameroons to Angola; rare.

== Taxonomy ==
Charaxes kahldeni is a member of the species group Charaxes zoolina. The clade members are:

- Charaxes zoolina nominate
- Charaxes kahldeni

The group differs from all the others in Charaxes in the male having a tail on vein 2, but the female having two long tails on veins 2 and 4. There are two different forms, one with black markings on a greenish-white base colour (wet-season form) and one with reddish-brown markings on red-yellow whitish colour (dry-season form). These forms can be from eggs of the same female.
