= Eicochrysops eicotrochilus =

Scientific classification
- Domain: Eukaryota
- Kingdom: Animalia
- Phylum: Arthropoda
- Class: Insecta
- Order: Lepidoptera
- Family: Lycaenidae
- Genus: Eicochrysops
- Species: E. eicotrochilus

Binomial name
- Eicochrysops eicotrochilus Bethune-Baker, 1924

Species of butterfly

Eicochrysops eicotrochilus, the brachystegia blue, is a butterfly in the family Lycaenidae. It is found in the Democratic Republic of the Congo (South Kivu, Shaba and Lualaba), Angola, Tanzania, Zambia and Zimbabwe (Harare District). The habitat consists of Brachystegia woodland.

Adults are on wing from October to February.
