= Sarangesa gaerdesi =

Scientific classification
- Kingdom: Animalia
- Phylum: Arthropoda
- Clade: Pancrustacea
- Class: Insecta
- Order: Lepidoptera
- Family: Hesperiidae
- Genus: Sarangesa
- Species: S. gaerdesi

Binomial name
- Sarangesa gaerdesi Evans, 1949

Species of butterfly

Sarangesa gaerdesi, commonly known as the Namibian elfin, is a species of butterfly in the family Hesperiidae. It is found in Namibia. The habitat consists of dry savanna.

The larvae of subspecies gaerdesi feed on Petalidium engleranum and the larvae of subspecies smithae on Petalidium variabile.

== Subspecies ==
- Sarangesa gaerdesi gaerdesi - northern and central Namibia
- Sarangesa gaerdesi smithae Vári, 1976 - south-central Namibia
