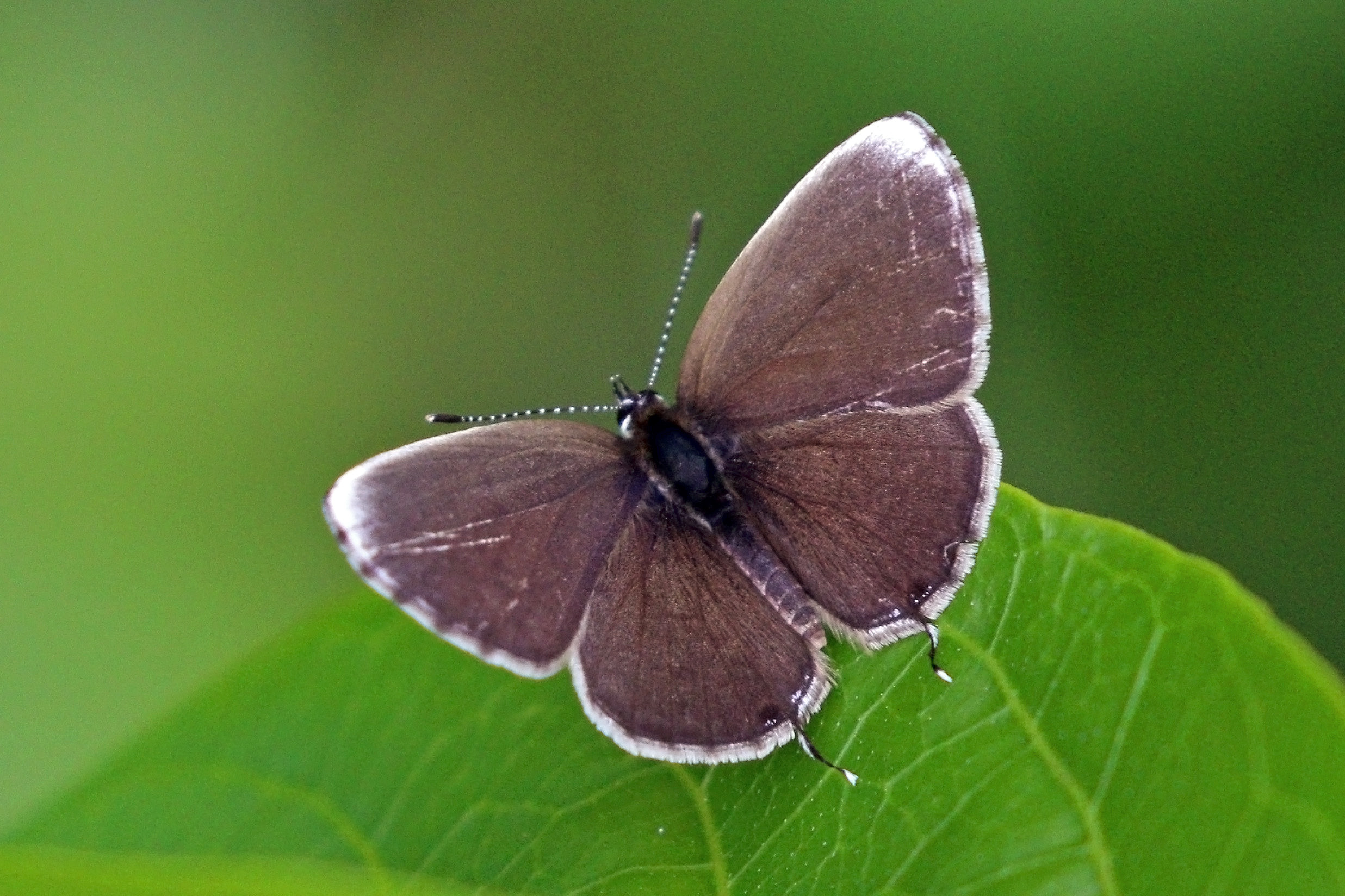
- Semliki Wildlife Reserve, Uganda
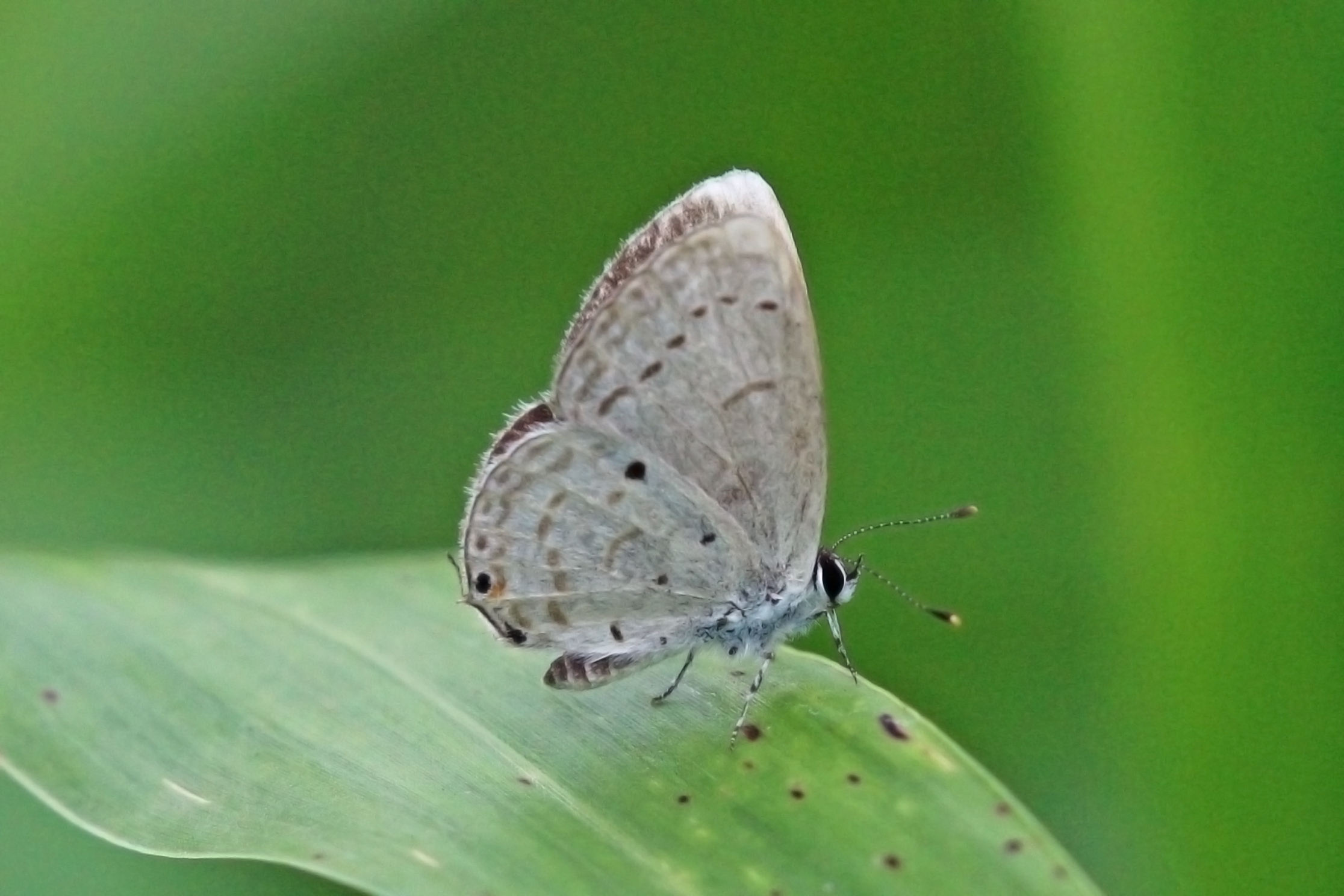
- Ghana

Scientific classification
- Kingdom: Animalia
- Phylum: Arthropoda
- Clade: Pancrustacea
- Class: Insecta
- Order: Lepidoptera
- Family: Lycaenidae
- Genus: Eicochrysops
- Species: E. hippocrates

Binomial name
- Eicochrysops hippocrates (Fabricius, 1793)

Synonyms
- Hesperia hippocrates Fabricius, 1793; Lycaena delicatula Mabille, 1877

= Eicochrysops hippocrates =

Species of butterfly

Eicochrysops hippocrates, the white-tipped blue, is a butterfly of the family Lycaenidae. It is found in Africa, south of the Sahara, including Madagascar. In South Africa it is found from the East Cape along the KwaZulu-Natal coast to Eswatini, Mpumalanga and the Limpopo province.

The wingspan is 18–23 mm for males and 20–24 mm for females. Adults are on wing from September to November and from January to June. There are two generations per year.

The larvae feed on Polygonum and Rumex species.

Torben Larsen developed a species numbering system for his 2005 publication Butterflies of West Africa. This species is #593. The 'Larsen' numbers have since been used with permission in A Sharp Eye on Butterflies of Ghana.
