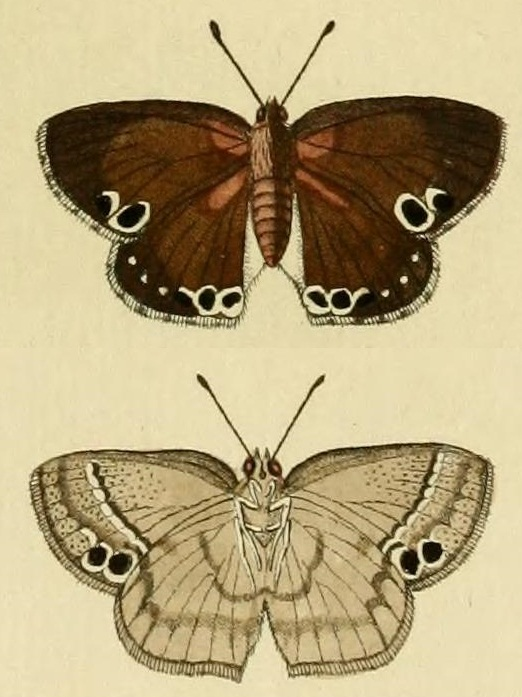

Conservation status
- Least Concern (IUCN 3.1)

Scientific classification
- Kingdom: Animalia
- Phylum: Arthropoda
- Class: Insecta
- Order: Lepidoptera
- Family: Lycaenidae
- Genus: Leptomyrina
- Species: L. lara

Binomial name
- Leptomyrina lara (Linnaeus, 1764)

Synonyms
- Papilio lara Linnaeus, 1764; Gonatomyrina lara

= Leptomyrina lara =

Species of butterfly

Leptomyrina lara, the Cape black-eye, is a butterfly of the family Lycaenidae. It is found in South Africa, in fynbos, Nama Karoo and Succulent Karoo throughout the Western Cape to the Eastern Cape, the eastern parts of Free State, the mountains of Lesotho and Northern Cape.

The wingspan is 20–29 mm for males and 23–31 mm for females. Adults are on wing from August to April. There are several generations per year in summer and spring.

The larvae feed on Kalanchoe lugardii, Crassula and Cotyledon plant species (including C. orbiculata).
