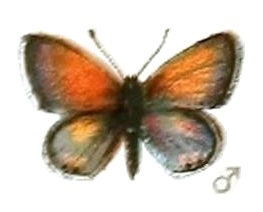

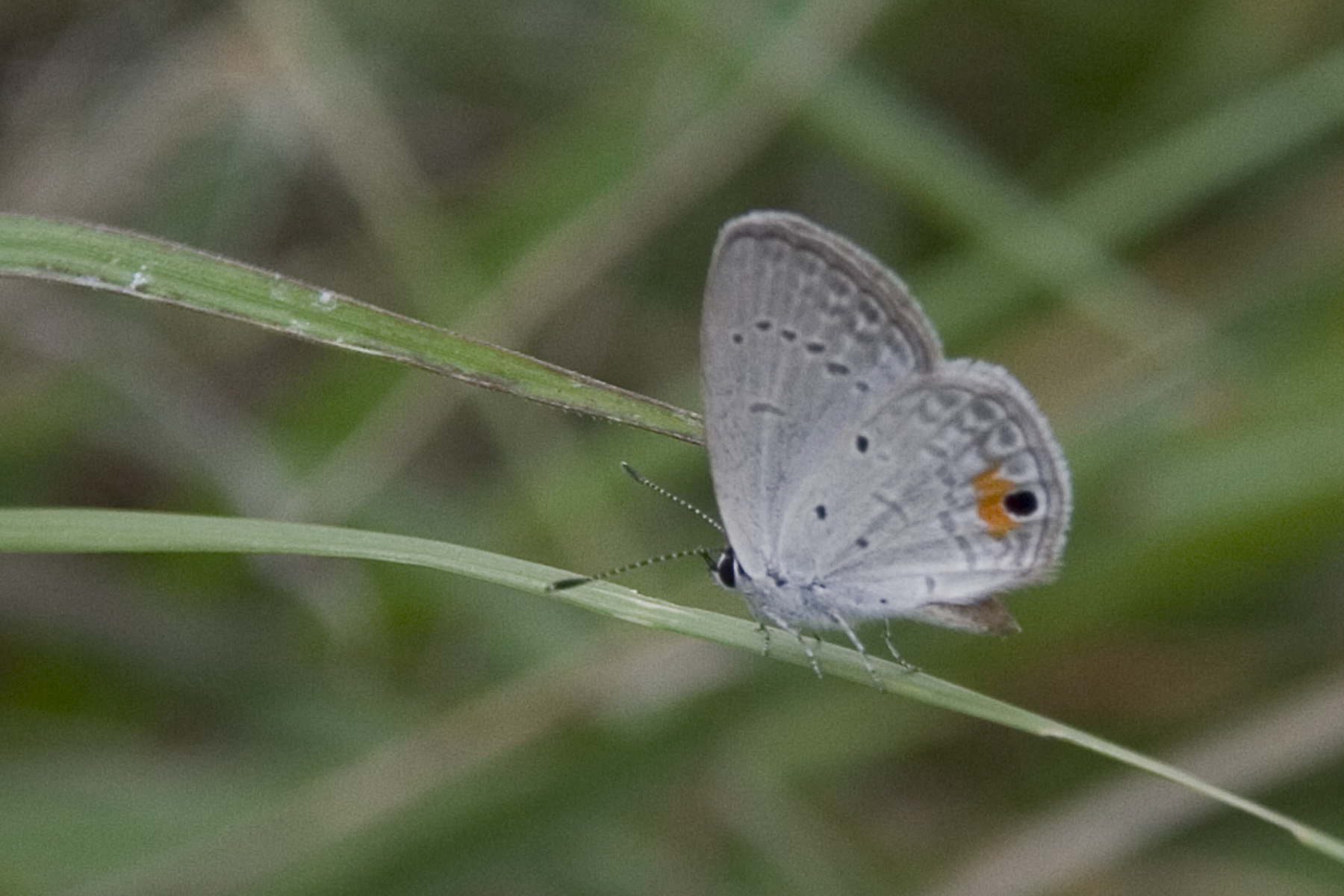
- male and wing undersides

Scientific classification
- Domain: Eukaryota
- Kingdom: Animalia
- Phylum: Arthropoda
- Class: Insecta
- Order: Lepidoptera
- Family: Lycaenidae
- Genus: Eicochrysops
- Species: E. messapus

Binomial name
- Eicochrysops messapus (Godart, [1824])

Synonyms
- Polyommatus messapus Godart, [1824]; Cupido sapphirina Stoneham, 1938; Lycaena acca Westwood, 1851; Lycaena mahallakoaena Wallengren, 1857; Eicochrysops mahallakoaena; Catochrysops nandiana Bethune-Baker, 1906; Polyommatus sebagadis Guérin-Méneville, 1849; Cupido messapus ab. trisignatus Strand, 1911

= Eicochrysops messapus =

Cupreous blue

Species of butterfly

Eicochrysops messapus, the cupreous blue, is a butterfly of the family Lycaenidae. It is found in Africa. In South Africa it is rare and only known from the northern part of the Limpopo province and northern KwaZulu-Natal.

The wingspan is 17–22 mm for males and 17–24 mm for females. Adults are on wing year-round in warmer areas, with peaks in October and March. In cooler areas it is not found from April to September.

The larvae probably feed on Thesium species.

== Subspecies ==
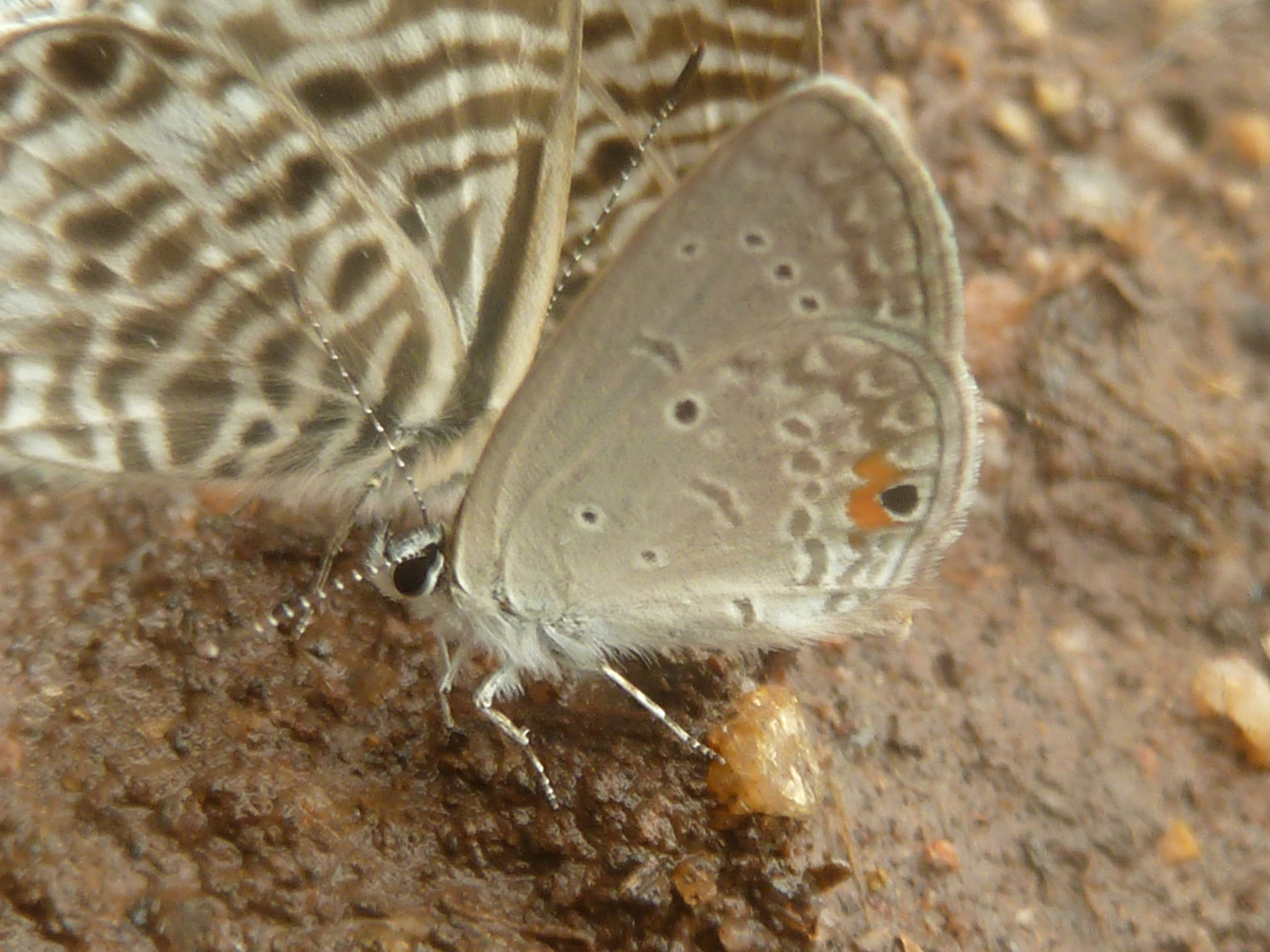
E. m. mahallakoeana, mud-puddling

- E. m. messapus — South Africa: Western Cape to Free State provinces
- E. m. mahallakoeana (Wallengren, 1857) — South Africa: northern Eastern Cape to KwaZulu-Natal, northern Free State, Mpumalanga, Gauteng, Limpopo and North West provinces
- E. m. nandiana (Bethune-Baker, 1906) — Kenya, Uganda
- E. m. sebagadis (Guérin-Méneville, 1849) — highlands of Ethiopia
