= Trimenia macmasteri =

McMaster's silver-spotted copper

Scientific classification
- Domain: Eukaryota
- Kingdom: Animalia
- Phylum: Arthropoda
- Class: Insecta
- Order: Lepidoptera
- Family: Lycaenidae
- Genus: Trimenia
- Species: T. macmasteri

Binomial name
- Trimenia macmasteri (Dickson, 1968)

Synonyms
- Phasis macmasteri Dickson, 1968

Species of butterfly

Trimenia macmasteri (McMaster's silver-spotted copper) is a butterfly of the family Lycaenidae. It is found in South Africa, where it is found from Beaufort West to the Roggeveld escarpment in the Western Cape.

The wingspan is 24–32 mm for males and 27–39 mm females. Adults are on wing from September to January, with a peak from October to December. There is one generation per year.

== Subspecies ==
- Trimenia macmasteri macmasteri (Western Cape from Great Karoo along the coastal hills to the Eastern Cape)
- Trimenia macmasteri mijburghi Dickson, 1980 (Namaqualand and Bushmanland in the Northern Cape and further north)
