= Trimenia wykehami =

Wykeham's silver-spotted copper

Scientific classification
- Kingdom: Animalia
- Phylum: Arthropoda
- Class: Insecta
- Order: Lepidoptera
- Family: Lycaenidae
- Genus: Trimenia
- Species: T. wykehami

Binomial name
- Trimenia wykehami (Dickson, 1969)
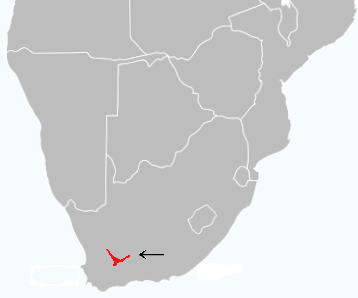
- native range

Synonyms
- Phasis argyroplaga wykehami Dickson, 1969

Species of butterfly

Trimenia wykehami, the Wykeham's silver-spotted copper, is a butterfly of the family Lycaenidae. It is found in South Africa, where it is found from Beaufort West to the Roggeveld escarpment in the Western Cape.

The wingspan is 24–32 mm for males and 27–39 mm females. Adults are on wing from November to December. There is one generation per year.
