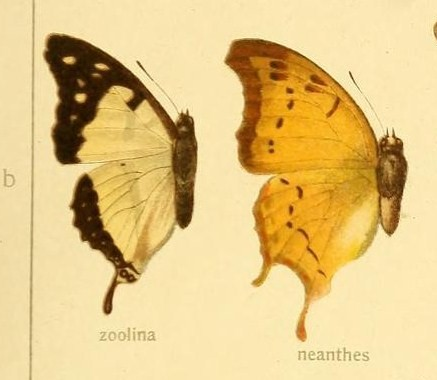
- Male wet-season form and female dry-season form (as neanthes)

Conservation status
- Least Concern (IUCN 3.1)

Scientific classification
- Kingdom: Animalia
- Phylum: Arthropoda
- Class: Insecta
- Order: Lepidoptera
- Family: Nymphalidae
- Genus: Charaxes
- Species: C. zoolina

Binomial name
- Charaxes zoolina (Westwood, [1850])

Synonyms
- Nymphalis zoolina Westwood, [1850]; Nymphalis neanthes Hewitson, 1854; Charaxes neanthes obscuratus Suffert, 1904; Charaxes zoolina-neanthes f. homochroa Le Cerf, 1923; Charaxes neanthes f. pallidior Rousseau-Decelle, 1938; Charaxes betsimisaraka Lucas, 1872; Charaxes betanimena Lucas, 1872; Charaxes andriba Ward, 1873; Charaxes relatus Butler, 1880; Nymphalis freyi Brancsik, 1892; Charaxes zoolina-betsimisaraka f. firmus Le Cerf, 1923; Charaxes lambertoni Lathy, 1925; Charaxes zoolina f. franouxi Rousseau-Decelle, 1938; Charaxes ehmckei Homeyer & Dewitz, 1882; Charaxes zoolina f. phanera Jordan, 1908; Charaxes zoolina ehmckei lineata Bivar de Sousa, 1992; Charaxes zoolina mafugensis f. kivu Turlin, 1980; Charaxes zoolina mafugensis f. wincka Turlin, 1980

= Charaxes zoolina =

Club-tailed emperor

Species of butterfly

Charaxes zoolina, the club-tailed emperor or club-tailed charaxes, is a butterfly of the family Nymphalidae. It is found in southern Africa.

== Description ==
The wingspan is 40–45 mm in males and 50–58 mm in females. The species of this group [zoolina group] differ from all others in the hindwing having in the male only one long tail, at vein 2, but in the female two, at veins 2 and 4. Ch. zoolina occurs in three local races, each with a greenish and a brown or brown-yellow form. The greenish white forms differ from kahldeni in the broad dark marginal band on the upperside of the wing and the yellow-brown forms from homeyeri [= kahldeni in the absence of the longitudinal stripe in cellule 1 c on the hindwing beneath.- zoolina Westw. wings with the ground-colour greenish white; forewing above with the costal margin, a transverse spot at the end of the cell and the apical area black, the latter more or less spotted with white; hindwing with a black marginal band, 4-5mm. in breadth, with small white dots. Wings beneath almost as above, but with larger white spots in the marginal bands, common black median band and black longitudinal stripe in cellule 1 c of the hindwing; distal margin of the hindwing scarcely appreciably angled at vein 4. The female is larger and has the light spots in the marginal bands much larger and joined together; hindwing above with yellowish marginal streaks. Natal to Uganda and Abyssinia, f. neanthes Hew. The ground-colour is lighter or darker ochre-yellow and the black markings of the type-form are replaced by ferruginous or dark brown; occasionally they are black, ab. obscuratus Suff. Under surface irrorated with dark, without the longitudinal stripe in cellule 1 c of the hindwing. ab. ehmckei Dew. Distal margin of the hindwing distinctly angled at vein 4. Otherwise only differs from neanthes in having both wings above broadly whitish at the base and beneath without distinct median band. Angola, f. phanera Jord. has in the male a distinct angle at vein 4 of the hindwing and less extended black markings on the forewing, but otherwise agrees with zoolina. Angola. ab. betsimisaraka Luc. occurs on Madagascar and only differs from zoolina in the hindwing of the male having a distinct though small tooth at the end of vein 4 and in the transverse streak at the end of the cell of the forewing only reaching the base of vein 3. f. betanimena Luc. corresponds to f. neanthes, but is darker and with the marginal band darker rust-brown and more continuous.

The hindwing in the male distinctly toothed at vein 4. Wings beneath without median band, or with this sharply pronounced and margined with white [is] ab. andriba Ward. Madagascar.

== Biology ==
Flight period is from October to June. The habitat is forest.

Larvae feed on Entada - Entada spicata, Entada abyssinica, Entada natalensis, Acacia natalitia, Acacia schweinfurthi, Acacia brevispica, and Acacia kraussiana.

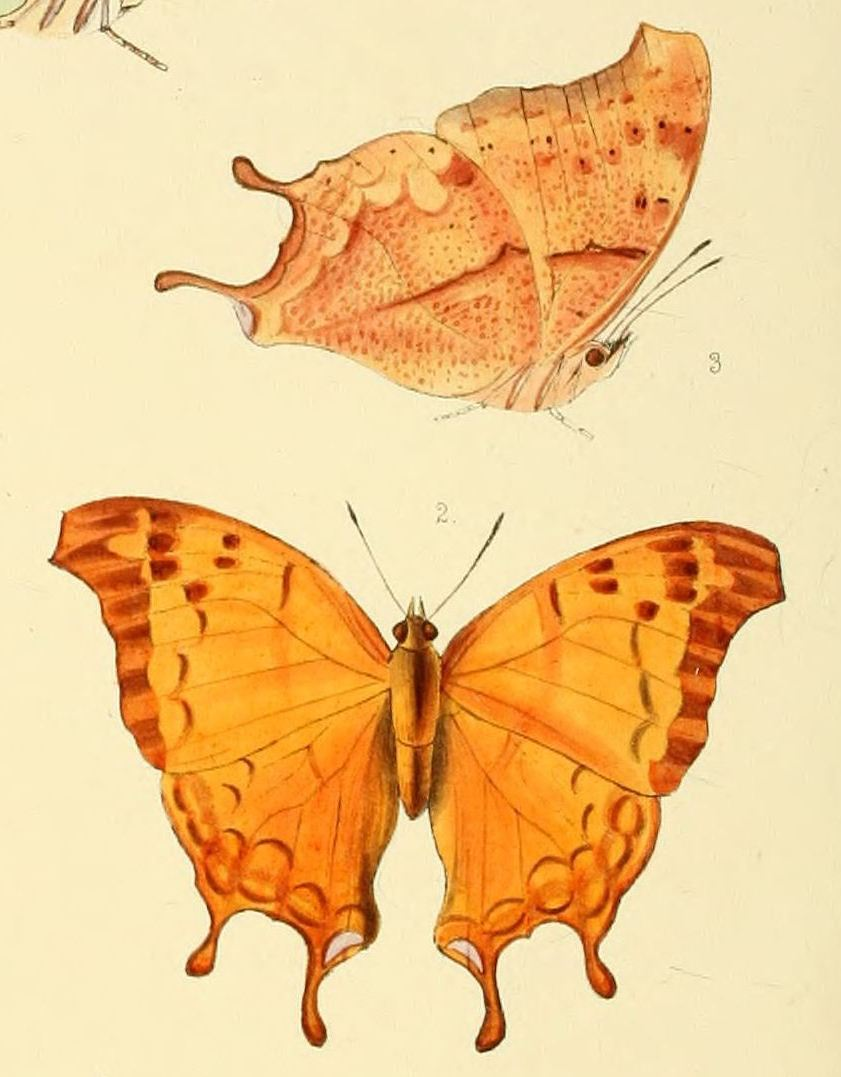
Female, under and upperside

== Subspecies ==
Listed alphabetically.

- C. z. betsimisaraka Lucas, 1872 (Madagascar)
- C. z. ehmckei Homeyer and Dewitz, 1882 (Angola)
- C. z. mafugensis Jackson, 1956 (south-western Uganda, Rwanda, Burundi, Democratic Republic of the Congo, north-western Tanzania)
- C. z. zoolina (Westwood, [1850]) (southern Sudan, southern Ethiopia, Somalia, Uganda, Kenya, Tanzania, Malawi, Zambia, Mozambique, Zimbabwe, northern Botswana, north-eastern Namibia, South Africa, Eswatini)

== Taxonomy ==
Charaxes zoolina is a member of the species group Charaxes zoolina. The clade members are

- Charaxes zoolina Nominate
- Charaxes kahldeni

The group differs from all the others in Charaxes in the male having a tail on vein 2, but the female having two long tails on veins 2, 4. There are two different forms, one with black markings on a greenish white base colour (wet-season form) and one with reddish-brown markings on red-yellow whitish colour (dry-season form). These forms can be from eggs of the same female.
