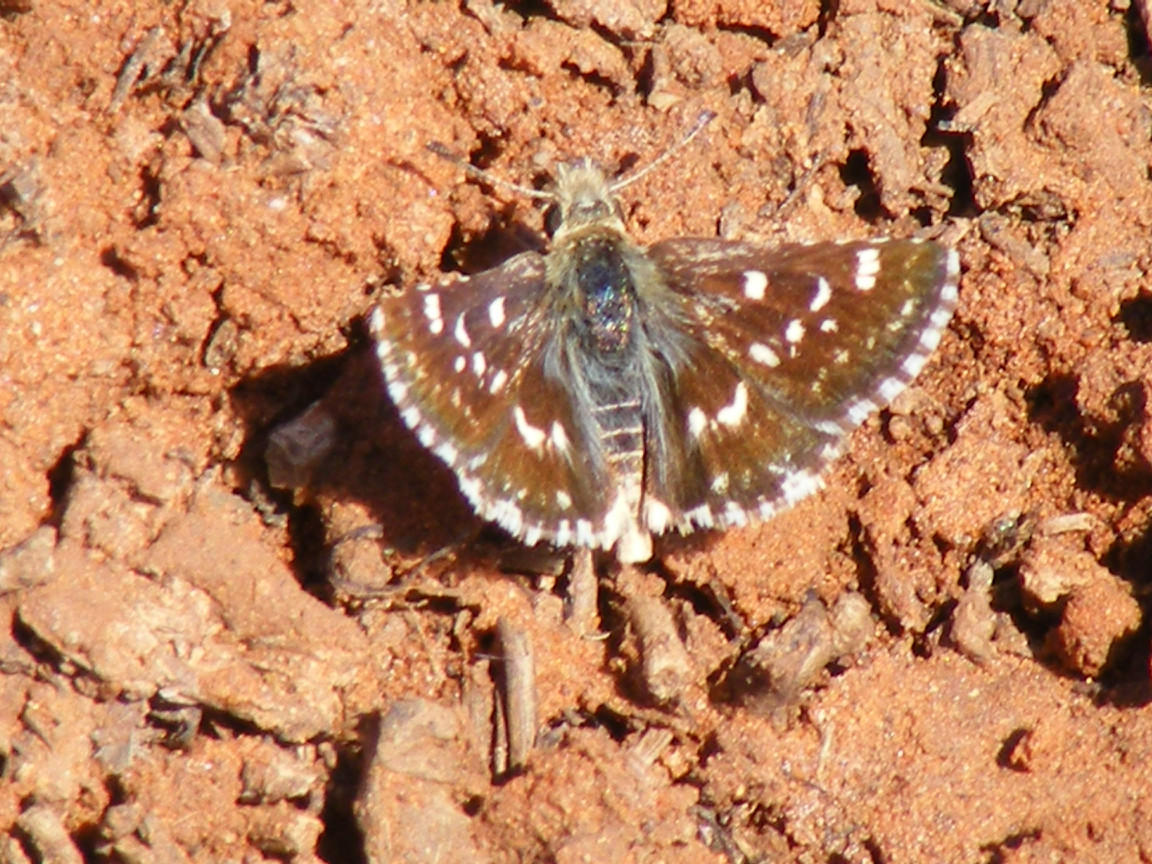

Scientific classification
- Domain: Eukaryota
- Kingdom: Animalia
- Phylum: Arthropoda
- Class: Insecta
- Order: Lepidoptera
- Family: Hesperiidae
- Genus: Spialia
- Species: S. nanus

Binomial name
- Spialia nanus (Trimen, 1889)

Synonyms
- Pyrgus nanus Trimen, 1889; Syrichtus nanus

= Spialia nanus =

Species of butterfly

Spialia nanus, the dwarf sandman, is a butterfly of the family Hesperiidae. It is found in South Africa, in the western Cape, western Free State, southern North West Province and the northern Cape.

The wingspan is 18–24 mm for males and 23–27 mm for females. There are two generations per year with peaks from March to April and from September to October.

The larvae feed on Hermannia species (including Hermannia diffusa, Hermannia incana, Hermannia comosa, Hermannia cuneifolia, Hermannia pulverata) and Hebiscus aethiopicus.
