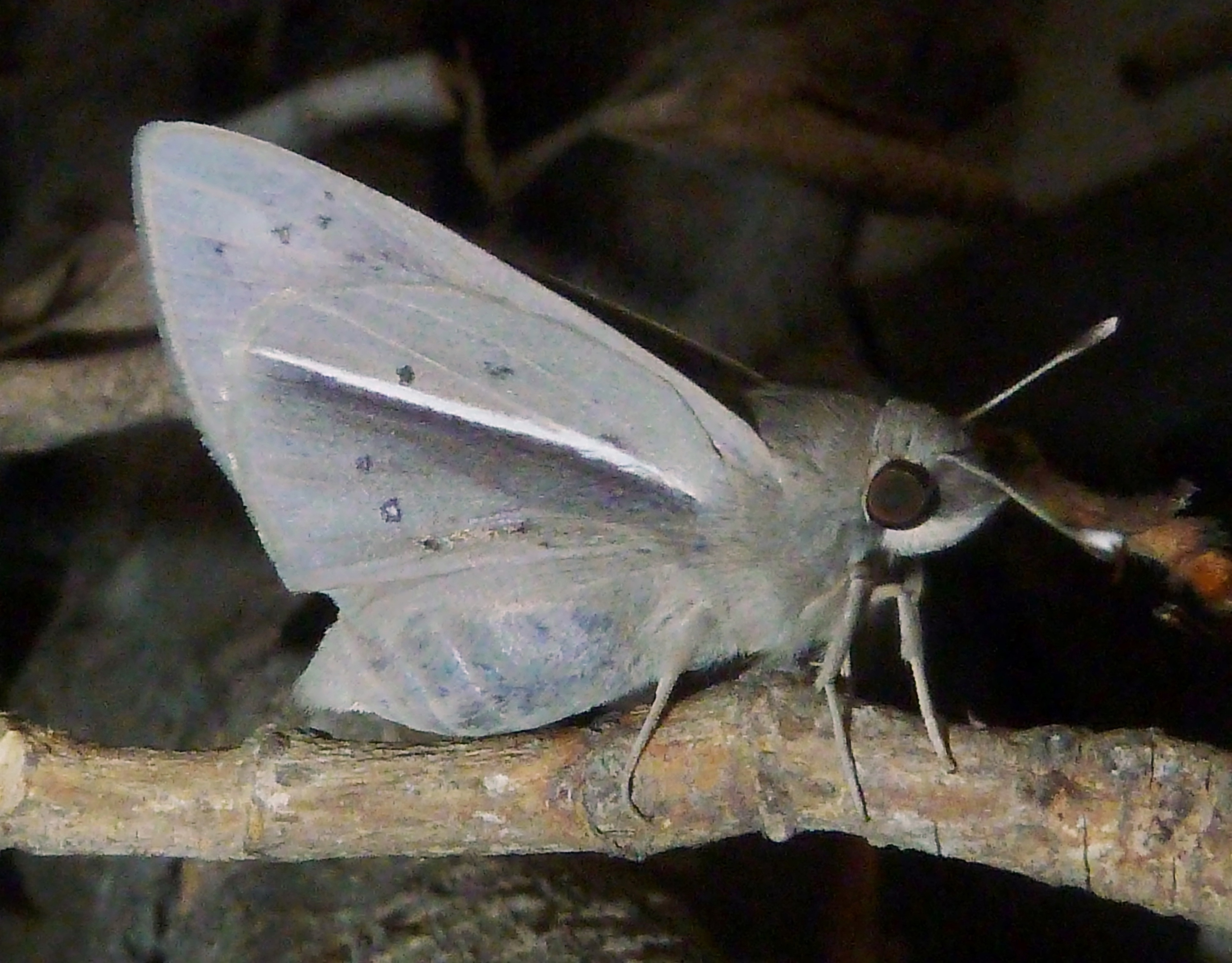

Scientific classification
- Domain: Eukaryota
- Kingdom: Animalia
- Phylum: Arthropoda
- Class: Insecta
- Order: Lepidoptera
- Family: Hesperiidae
- Genus: Zophopetes
- Species: Z. dysmephila

Binomial name
- Zophopetes dysmephila (Trimen, 1868)

Synonyms
- Pamphila dysmephila Trimen, 1868; Hesperia schulzi Plötz, 1882; Hesperia mucorea Karsch, 1892

= Zophopetes dysmephila =

Palm-tree nightfighter

Species of butterfly

Zophopetes dysmephila, the palm-tree nightfighter, is a butterfly of the family Hesperiidae. It is found in Mozambique, in South Africa from Port Elizabeth in the Eastern Cape to KwaZulu-Natal and Mpumalanga, and in Kenya. Their habitat consists of moist savanna and forests.

Their wingspan is 40–49 mm for males and 45–52 mm for females. Adults are on wing year-round with a peak from November to May in southern Africa.

The larvae feed on Chrysalidocarpus lutescens, Phoenix reclinata, Phoenix dactylifera, Phoenix canariensis, Raphia, Borassus and Cocos species.
