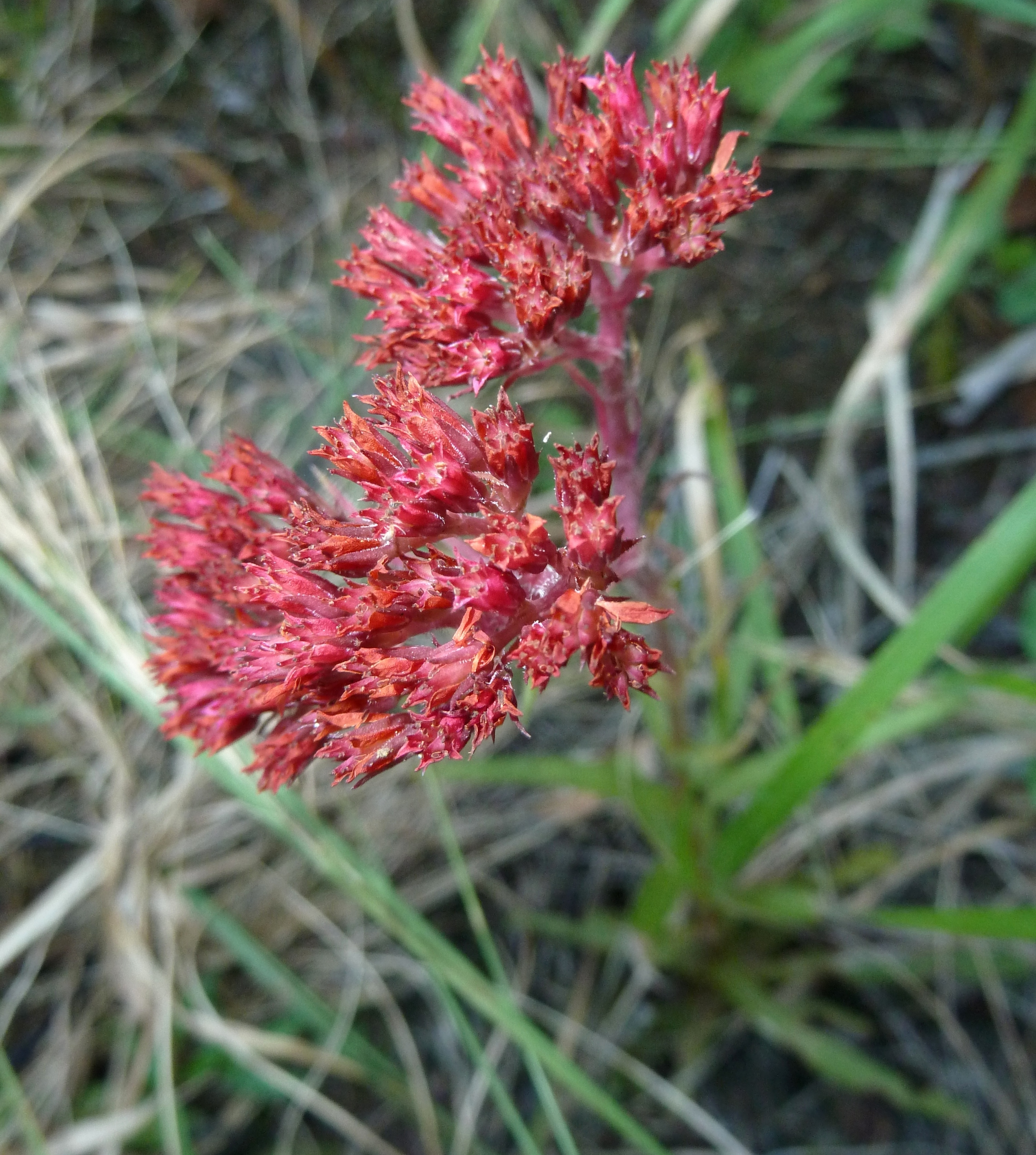
- Crassula alba in the grassland of Krantzkloof Nature Reserve.

Scientific classification
- Kingdom: Plantae
- Clade: Tracheophytes
- Clade: Angiosperms
- Clade: Eudicots
- Order: Saxifragales
- Family: Crassulaceae
- Genus: Crassula
- Species: C. alba

Binomial name
- Crassula alba Forssk.

= Crassula alba =

Species of succulent

Crassula alba is a species of flowering plant in the genus Crassula found in western Africa ranging from South Africa to Sudan.

== Taxonomy ==
Crassula alba is in the genus Crassula, family Crassulaceae and order Saxifragales. There are two accepted infraspecies, Crassula alba var. pallida and Crassula alba var. parvisepala.
