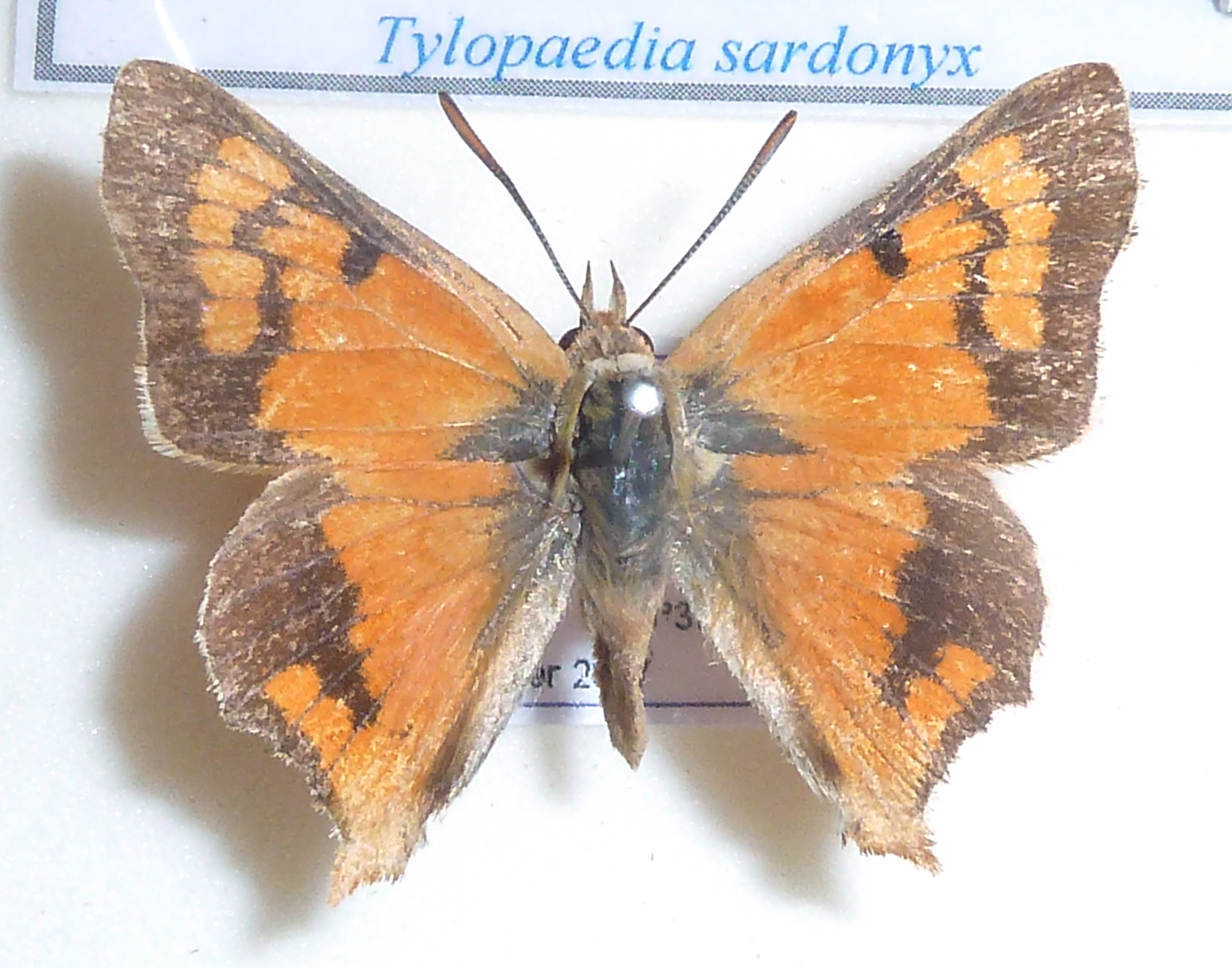

Scientific classification
- Domain: Eukaryota
- Kingdom: Animalia
- Phylum: Arthropoda
- Class: Insecta
- Order: Lepidoptera
- Family: Lycaenidae
- Subfamily: Aphnaeinae
- Genus: Tylopaedia; Tite & Dickson, 1973
- Species: T. sardonyx

Binomial name
- Tylopaedia sardonyx (Trimen, 1868)

Synonyms
- Zeritis sardonyx Trimen, 1868; Phasis sardonyx f. knobeli van Son, 1959; Phasis sardonyx peringueyi Dickson, 1969; Phasis sardonyx ab. peringueyi Aurivillius, 1924

= Tylopaedia =

King copper

Monotypic butterfly genus in family Lycaenidae

Tylopaedia is a butterfly genus in the family Lycaenidae. It is monotypic containing only the species Tylopaedia sardonyx, the king copper, which is found in South Africa and Namibia.

== Description ==
The wingspan is 32–40 mm for males and 35–50 mm females. Adults are on wing from August to December and from January to April in two generations per year.

== Habitat and behavior ==
The larvae feed on Aspalathus spinosa, Phylica olaefolia, and Euclea undulata.

== Subspecies ==
- Tylopaedia sardonyx sardonyx (eastern Western Cape to Namaqualand and near Karuman in the Northern Cape, north into Botswana, east to the Eastern Cape and the Free State)
- Tylopaedia sardonyx peringueyi (Dickson, 1969) (Western Cape)
- Tylopaedia sardonyx cerita (Henning & Henning, 1998) (central Namibia)
